= Netherlands at the Men's T20 World Cup =

International cricket delegation

- Association: Royal Dutch Cricket Association
- Total appearances: 7
- First appearance: 2009: England
- Latest appearance: 2026: India & Sri Lanka
- Best result: 8th place (2022)
- Most runs: Max O'Dowd (489)
- Most wickets: Paul van Meekeren (25)

The Netherlands national cricket team is one of the associate members of the International Cricket Council (ICC). Out of the nine editions of the tournament that have been held, the team has participated in six. They qualified for their first T20 World Cup in 2009, but failed to make it to the next two editions. They made their reappearance at the tournament in 2014 and have qualified for every edition since then.

The best performance of the Dutch came in 2022 when they finished in top 8 and earned a direct qualification for the 2024 edition. They have a win–loss record of 10–16 from 27 matches.

== T20 World Cup record ==
Men's T20 World Cup record										Qualification record (Note: WCL Division One served as the qualifier for the 2007 edition.)				
Year	Round	Position	Pld	W	L	T	NR	Ab (Note: Abandoned matches are not counted in the official records.)	Cap	Pld	W	L	T	NR
(South Africa) 2007	Did not qualify									5	3	2	0	0
(England) 2009	Group stage	9/12	2	1	1	0	0	0	Jeroen Smits	4	2	1	0	1
(Cricket West Indies) 2010	Did not qualify									6	3	3	0	0
(Sri Lanka) 2012	Did not qualify									9	7	2	0	0
(Bangladesh) 2014	Super 10	9/16	7	3	4	0	0	0	Peter Borren	10	7	3	0	0
(India) 2016	First round	12/16	3	1	1	0	1	0	Peter Borren	9	6	2	0	1
(United Arab Emirates) (Oman) 2021	First round	15/16	3	0	3	0	0	0	Pieter Seelaar	9	8	1	0	0
(Australia) 2022	Super 12	8/16	8	4	4	0	0	0	Scott Edwards	5	4	1	0	0
(United States) (Cricket West Indies) 2024	Group stage	14/20	4	1	3	0	0	0	Scott Edwards	Qualified automatically				
(India) (Sri Lanka) 2026	Group stage	15/20	4	1	3	0	0	0	Scott Edwards	4	3	1	0	0
Total	0 Titles	7/10	31	11	19	0	1	0	—N/a	61	43	16	0	2

=== Record by opponents ===
Positive Record Neutral Record Negative Record

Opponent	M	W	L	T+W	T+L	NR	Ab	Win %	First played
Bangladesh	3	0	3	0	0	0	0	0.00	2016
England	2	2	0	0	0	0	0	100	2009
India	2	0	2	0	0	0	0	0.00	2022
Ireland	3	2	1	0	0	0	0	66.67	2022
Namibia	3	2	1	0	0	0	0	66.67	2021
Nepal	1	1	0	0	0	0	0	100	2024
New Zealand	1	0	1	0	0	0	0	0.00	2014
Oman	1	0	0	0	0	1	0	0.00	2016
Pakistan	3	0	3	0	0	0	0	0.00	2009
South Africa	3	1	2	0	0	0	0	33.33	2014
Sri Lanka	4	0	4	0	0	0	0	0.00	2014
United Arab Emirates	2	2	0	0	0	0	0	100	2014
United States	1	0	1	0	0	0	0	0.00	2026
Zimbabwe	2	1	1	0	0	0	0	50	2014
Total	31	11	19	0	0	1	0	36.67	—N/a
Source: Last Updated: 8 March 2026

== Tournament results ==
=== 2009 World Cup ===
Squad and kit

- Jeroen Smits (c, wk)
- Tom de Grooth
- Mudassar Bukhari
- Ryan ten Doeschate
- Alexei Kervezee
- Dirk Nannes
- Darron Reekers
- Bas Zuiderent
- Peter Borren
- Edgar Schiferli
- Eric Szwarczynski
- Maurits Jonkman
- Pieter Seelaar
- Daan van Bunge
- Ruud Nijman

2009 kit

Results

Group stage (Group B)			Super 8s		Semifinal	Final	Overall Result
Opposition Result	Opposition Result	Rank	Opposition Result	Rank	Opposition Result	Opposition Result	Overall Result
England; Won by 4 wickets	Pakistan; Lost by 82 runs	3	Did not advance				Group stage
Source: Cricinfo

Scorecards

Group stage (Group B)

5 June 2009
17:30 (D/N)
Scorecard

England; 162/5 (20 overs)	v	Netherlands; 163/6 (20 overs)
Luke Wright 71 (49); Ryan ten Doeschate 2/35 (4 overs)		Tom de Grooth 49 (30); James Anderson 3/23 (4 overs)

Netherlands won by 4 wickets
Lord's, London
Umpires: Asoka de Silva (SL) and Steve Davis (Aus)
Player of the match: Tom de Grooth (Ned)

- Netherlands won the toss and elected to field.

9 June 2009
13:30
Scorecard

Pakistan; 175/5 (20 overs)	v	Netherlands; 93 (17.3 overs)
Kamran Akmal 41 (30); Pieter Seelaar 2/36 (4 overs)		Alexei Kervezee 21 (29); Shahid Afridi 4/11 (4 overs)

Pakistan won by 82 runs
Lord's, London
Umpires: Billy Doctrove (WI) and Amiesh Saheba (Ind)
Player of the match: Kamran Akmal (Pak)

- Pakistan won the toss and elected to bat.
- Netherlands were eliminated as a result of this match.

=== 2014 World Cup ===
Squad and kit

- Peter Borren (c)
- Wesley Barresi (wk)
- Mudassar Bukhari
- Ben Cooper
- Tom Cooper
- Tom Heggelman
- Vivian Kingma
- Ahsan Malik
- Stephan Myburgh
- Michael Rippon
- Pieter Seelaar
- Michael Swart
- Eric Szwarczynski
- Logan van Beek
- Timm van der Gugten

2014 kit

Results

First stage (Group B)				Super 10 (Group 1)					Semifinal	Final	Overall Result
Opposition Result	Opposition Result	Opposition Result	Rank	Opposition Result	Opposition Result	Opposition Result	Opposition Result	Rank	Opposition Result	Opposition Result	Overall Result
United Arab Emirates; Won by 6 wickets	Zimbabwe; Lost by 5 wickets	Ireland; Won by 6 wickets	1	Sri Lanka; Lost by 9 wickets	South Africa; Lost by 6 runs	New Zealand; Lost by 6 wickets	England; Won by 45 runs	5	Did not advance		Super 10
Source: Cricinfo

Scorecards

First stage (Group B)

17 March 2014
Scorecard

United Arab Emirates; 151 (19.5 overs)	v	Netherlands; 152/4 (18.5 overs)
Shaiman Anwar 32 (19); Ahsan Malik 3/16 (3.5 overs)		Stephan Myburgh 55 (36); Kamran Shazad 2/19 (4 overs)

Netherlands won by 6 wickets
Sylhet International Cricket Stadium, Sylhet

19 March 2014
Scorecard

Netherlands; 140/5 (20 overs)	v	Zimbabwe; 146/5 (20 overs)
Tom Cooper 72 (58); Prosper Utseya 2/24 (4 overs)		Brendan Taylor 49 (39); Pieter Seelaar 2/9 (2 overs)

Zimbabwe won by 5 wickets
Sylhet International Cricket Stadium, Sylhet

21 March
Scorecard

Ireland; 189/4 (20 overs)	v	Netherlands; 193/4 (13.5 overs)
Andrew Poynter 57 (38); Ahsan Malik 2/26 (4 overs)		Stephan Myburgh 63 (23); Kevin O'Brien 2/29 (3 overs)

Netherlands won by 6 wickets
Sylhet International Cricket Stadium, Sylhet

Super 10 (Group 1)

24 March 2014
19:30 (D/N)
Scorecard

Netherlands; 39 (10.3 overs)	v	Sri Lanka; 40/1 (5 overs)
Tom Cooper 16 (18); Ajantha Mendis 3/12 (2.3 overs)		Kusal Perera 14 (10); Ahsan Malik 1/18 (2 overs)

Sri Lanka won by 9 wickets
Zohur Ahmed Chowdhury Stadium, Chittagong
Umpires: Paul Reiffel (Aus) and Rod Tucker (Aus)
Player of the match: Angelo Mathews (SL)

- Sri Lanka won the toss and elected to field
- The Netherlands' total was the lowest by any team in a T20I match at the time.

27 March 2014
15:30
Scorecard

South Africa; 145/9 (20 overs)	v	Netherlands; 139 (18.4 overs)
Hashim Amla 43 (22); Ahsan Malik 5/19 (4 overs)		Stephan Myburgh 51 (28); Imran Tahir 4/21 (4 overs)

South Africa won by 6 runs
Zohur Ahmed Chowdhury Stadium, Chittagong
Umpires: Steve Davis (Aus) and Bruce Oxenford (Aus)
Player of the match: Imran Tahir (SA)

- Netherlands won the toss and elected to field

29 March 2014
15:30
Scorecard

Netherlands; 151/4 (20 overs)	v	New Zealand; 152/4 (19 overs)
Peter Borren 49 (35); Nathan McCullum 1/20 (4 overs)		Brendon McCullum 65 (45); Timm van der Gugten 3/30 (4 overs)

New Zealand won by 6 wickets.
Zohur Ahmed Chowdhury Stadium, Chittagong
Umpires: Aleem Dar (Pak) and Bruce Oxenford (Aus)
Player of the match: Brendon McCullum (NZ)

- New Zealand won the toss and elected to field
- Netherlands were eliminated as a result of this match

31 March 2014
15:30
Scorecard

Netherlands; 133/5 (20 overs)	v	England; 88 (17.4 overs)
Wesley Barresi 48 (45); Stuart Broad 3/24 (4 overs)		Ravi Bopara 18 (20); Mudassar Bukhari 3/12 (3.4 overs)

Netherlands won by 45 runs
Zohur Ahmed Chowdhury Stadium, Chittagong
Umpires: Steve Davis (Aus) and Bruce Oxenford (Aus)
Player of the match: Mudassar Bukhari (Neth)

- England won the toss and elected to field
- 88 was the lowest total of a Full Member Nation against an associate nation at the time.

=== 2016 World Cup ===
Squad and kit

- Peter Borren (c)
- Pieter Seelaar (vc)
- Wesley Barresi (wk)
- Mudassar Bukhari
- Ben Cooper
- Tom Cooper
- Timm van der Gugten
- Ahsan Malik
- Paul van Meekeren
- Roelof van der Merwe
- Stephan Myburgh
- Max O'Dowd
- Michael Rippon
- Logan van Beek
- Vivian Kingma

2014 kit

Results

First stage (Group A)				Super 12		Semifinal	Final	Overall Result
Opposition Result	Opposition Result	Opposition Result	Rank	Opposition Result	Rank	Opposition Result	Opposition Result	Overall Result
Bangladesh; Lost by 8 runs	Oman; No result	Ireland; Won by 12 runs	2	Did not advance				First round
Source: Cricinfo

Scorecards

First round (Group A)

9 March 2016
15:00 (D/N)
Scorecard

Bangladesh; 153/7 (20 overs)	v	Netherlands; 145/7 (20 overs)
Tamim Iqbal 83* (58); Timm van der Gugten 3/21 (4 overs)		Peter Borren 29 (28); Al-Amin Hossain 2/24 (3 overs)

Bangladesh won by 8 runs
Himachal Pradesh Cricket Association Stadium, Dharamshala
Umpires: Sundaram Ravi (Ind) and Rod Tucker (Aus)
Player of the match: Tamim Iqbal (Ban)

- Netherlands won the toss and elected to field.

11 March 2016
15:00 (D/N)
Scorecard

Netherlands	v	Oman

No result
Himachal Pradesh Cricket Association Stadium, Dharamshala
Umpires: Chris Gaffaney (NZ) and Sundaram Ravi (Ind)

- Oman won the toss and elected to field.
- No play was possible due to rain.
- Netherlands were eliminated as a result of this match.

13 March 2016
15:00 (D/N)
Scorecard

Netherlands; 59/5 (6 overs)	v	Ireland; 47/7 (6 overs)
Stephan Myburgh 27 (18); George Dockrell 3/7 (2 overs)		Paul Stirling 15 (7); Paul van Meekeren 4/11 (2 overs)

Netherlands won by 12 runs
Himachal Pradesh Cricket Association Stadium, Dharamshala
Umpires: Nigel Llong (Eng) and Sundaram Ravi (Ind)
Player of the match: Paul van Meekeren (Ned)

- Ireland won the toss and elected to field.
- The match was reduced to six overs per side due to rain.

=== 2021 World Cup ===
Squad and kit

- Pieter Seelaar (c)
- Colin Ackermann
- Philippe Boissevain
- Ben Cooper
- Bas de Leede
- Scott Edwards
- Brandon Glover
- Fred Klaassen
- Stephan Myburgh
- Max O'Dowd
- Ryan ten Doeschate
- Logan van Beek
- Timm van der Gugten
- Roelof van der Merwe
- Paul van Meekeren

2021 kit

Results

First stage (Group A)				Super 10		Semifinal	Final	Overall Result
Opposition Result	Opposition Result	Opposition Result	Rank	Opposition Result	Rank	Opposition Result	Opposition Result	Overall Result
Ireland; Lost by 7 wickets	Namibia; Lost by 6 wickets	Sri Lanka; Lost by 8 wickets	4	Did not advance				First round
Source: Cricinfo

Scorecards

First round (Group A)

18 October 2021
14:00
Scorecard

Netherlands; 106 (20 overs)	v	Ireland; 107/3 (15.1 overs)
Max O'Dowd 51 (47); Curtis Campher 4/26 (4 overs)		Gareth Delany 44 (29); Pieter Seelaar 1/14 (2.1 overs)

Ireland won by 7 wickets
Sheikh Zayed Cricket Stadium, Abu Dhabi
Umpires: Marais Erasmus (SA) and Rod Tucker (Aus)
Player of the match: Curtis Campher (Ire)

- Netherlands won the toss and elected to bat.

20 October 2021
14:00
Scorecard

Netherlands; 164/4 (20 overs)	v	Namibia; 166/4 (19 overs)
Max O'Dowd 70 (56); Jan Frylinck 2/36 (4 overs)		David Wiese 66* (40); Pieter Seelaar 1/8 (2 overs)

Namibia won by 6 wickets
Sheikh Zayed Cricket Stadium, Abu Dhabi
Umpires: Michael Gough (Eng) and Langton Rusere (Zim)
Player of the match: David Wiese (Nam)

- Namibia won the toss and elected to field.

22 October 2021
18:00 (N)
Scorecard

Netherlands; 44 (10 overs)	v	Sri Lanka; 45/2 (7.1 overs)
Colin Ackermann 11 (9); Lahiru Kumara 3/7 (3 overs)		Kusal Perera 33* (24); Brandon Glover 1/12 (3 overs)

Sri Lanka won by 8 wickets
Sharjah Cricket Stadium, Sharjah
Umpires: Richard Illingworth (Eng) and Joel Wilson (WI)
Player of the match: Lahiru Kumara (SL)

- Sri Lanka won the toss and elected to field.
- Netherlands was eliminated.

=== 2022 World Cup ===
Squad and kit

- Scott Edwards (c, wk)
- Colin Ackermann
- Shariz Ahmad
- Logan van Beek
- Tom Cooper
- Brandon Glover
- Timm van der Gugten
- Fred Klaassen
- Bas de Leede
- Paul van Meekeren
- Roelof van der Merwe
- Stephan Myburgh
- Teja Nidamanuru
- Max O'Dowd
- Tim Pringle
- Vikramjit Singh

2022 kit

Results

First stage (Group A)				Super 12 (Group 2)						Semifinal	Final	Overall Result
Opposition Result	Opposition Result	Opposition Result	Rank	Opposition Result	Opposition Result	Opposition Result	Opposition Result	Opposition Result	Rank	Opposition Result	Opposition Result	Overall Result
United Arab Emirates; Won by 3 wickets	Namibia; Won by 5 wickets	Sri Lanka; Lost by 16 runs	2	Bangladesh; Lost by 9 runs	India; Lost by 56 runs	Pakistan; Lost by 6 wickets	Zimbabwe; Won by 5 wickets	South Africa; Won by 13 runs	4	Did not advance		Super 12
Source: Cricinfo

Scorecards

First round (Group A)

16 October 2022
19:00 (N)
Scorecard

United Arab Emirates; 111/8 (20 overs)	v	Netherlands; 112/7 (19.5 overs)
Muhammad Waseem 41 (47); Bas de Leede 3/19 (3 overs)		Max O'Dowd 23 (18); Junaid Siddique 3/24 (4 overs)

Netherlands won by 3 wickets
Kardinia Park, Geelong
Umpires: Richard Kettleborough (Eng) and Paul Reiffel (Aus)
Player of the match: Bas de Leede (Ned)

- United Arab Emirates won the toss and elected to bat.

18 October 2022
15:00
Scorecard

Namibia; 121/6 (20 overs)	v	Netherlands; 122/5 (19.3 overs)
Jan Frylinck 43 (48); Bas de Leede 2/18 (3 overs)		Vikramjit Singh 39 (31); JJ Smit 2/24 (4 overs)

Netherlands won by 5 wickets
Kardinia Park, Geelong
Umpires: Richard Kettleborough (Eng) and Joel Wilson (WI)
Player of the match: Bas de Leede (Ned)

- Namibia won the toss and elected to bat.

20 October 2022
15:00
Scorecard

Sri Lanka; 162/6 (20 overs)	v	Netherlands; 146/9 (20 overs)
Kusal Mendis 79 (44); Paul van Meekeren 2/25 (4 overs)		Max O'Dowd 71* (53); Wanindu Hasaranga 3/28 (4 overs)

Sri Lanka won by 16 runs
Kardinia Park, Geelong
Umpires: Marais Erasmus (SA) and Joel Wilson (WI)
Player of the match: Kusal Mendis (SL)

- Sri Lanka won the toss and elected to bat.

Super 12 (Group 2)

24 October 2022
15:00
Scorecard

Bangladesh; 144/8 (20 overs)	v	Netherlands; 135 (20 overs)
Afif Hossain 38 (27); Paul van Meekeren 2/21 (4 overs)		Colin Ackermann 62 (48); Taskin Ahmed 4/25 (4 overs)

Bangladesh won by 9 runs
Bellerive Oval, Hobart
Umpires: Chris Gaffaney (NZ) and Nitin Menon (Ind)
Player of the match: Taskin Ahmed (Ban)

- Netherlands won the toss and elected to field.

27 October 2022
18:00 (N)
Scorecard

India; 179/2 (20 overs)	v	Netherlands; 123/9 (20 overs)
Virat Kohli 62* (44); Paul van Meekeren 1/32 (4 overs)		Tim Pringle 20 (15); Bhuvneshwar Kumar 2/9 (3 overs)

India won by 56 runs
Sydney Cricket Ground, Sydney
Umpires: Michael Gough (Eng) and Ahsan Raza (Pak)
Player of the match: Suryakumar Yadav (Ind)

- India won the toss and elected to bat.

30 October 2022
15:00
Scorecard

Netherlands; 91/9 (20 overs)	v	Pakistan; 95/4 (13.5 overs)
Colin Ackermann 27 (27); Shadab Khan 3/22 (4 overs)		Mohammad Rizwan 49 (39); Brandon Glover 2/22 (2.5 overs)

Pakistan won by 6 wickets
Perth Stadium, Perth
Umpires: Richard Illingworth (Eng) and Paul Reiffel (Aus)
Player of the match: Shadab Khan (Pak)

- Netherlands won the toss and elected to bat.

2 November 2022
14:30
Scorecard

Zimbabwe; 117 (19.2 overs)	v	Netherlands; 120/5 (18 overs)
Sikandar Raza 40 (24); Paul van Meekeren 3/29 (4 overs)		Max O'Dowd 52 (47); Richard Ngarava 2/18 (4 overs)

Netherlands won by 5 wickets
Adelaide Oval, Adelaide
Umpires: Adrian Holdstock (SA) and Richard Illingworth (Eng)
Player of the match: Max O'Dowd (Ned)

- Zimbabwe won the toss and elected to bat.

6 November 2022
10:30
Scorecard

Netherlands; 158/4 (20 overs)	v	South Africa; 145/8 (20 overs)
Colin Ackermann 41* (26); Keshav Maharaj 2/27 (4 overs)		Rilee Rossouw 25 (19); Brandon Glover 3/9 (2 overs)

Netherlands won by 13 runs
Adelaide Oval, Adelaide
Umpires: Michael Gough (Eng) and Langton Rusere (Zim)
Player of the match: Colin Ackermann (Ned)

- South Africa won the toss and elected to field.

=== 2024 World Cup ===
Squad and kit

- Scott Edwards (c, wk)
- Kyle Klein
- Logan van Beek
- Bas de Leede
- Sybrand Engelbrecht
- Ryan Klein
- Vivian Kingma
- Wesley Barresi (wk)
- Michael Levitt
- Max O'Dowd
- Aryan Dutt
- Teja Nidamanuru
- Tim Pringle
- Vikramjit Singh
- Paul van Meekeren
- Saqib Zulfiqar
- Note: Fred Klaassen and Daniel Doram were ruled out due to injuries.

2024 kit

Results

First stage (Group D)					Super 8		Semifinal	Final	Overall Result
Opposition Result	Opposition Result	Opposition Result	Opposition Result	Rank	Opposition Result	Rank	Opposition Result	Opposition Result	Overall Result
Nepal; Won by 6 wickets	South Africa; Lost by 4 wickets	Bangladesh; Lost by 25 runs	Sri Lanka; Lost by 83 runs	4	Did not advance				Group stage
Source: Cricinfo

Scorecards

Group stage (Group D)

4 June 2024
10:30 UTC−5
Scorecard

Nepal; 106 (19.2 overs)	v	Netherlands; 109/4 (18.4 overs)
Rohit Paudel 35 (37); Logan van Beek 3/18 (3.2 overs)		Max O'Dowd 54* (48); Dipendra Singh Airee 1/6 (2 overs)

Netherlands won by 6 wickets
Grand Prairie Stadium, Dallas
Umpires: Langton Rusere (Zim) and Rod Tucker (Aus)
Player of the match: Tim Pringle (Ned)

- Netherlands won the toss and elected to field.

8 June 2024
10:30 UTC−4
Scorecard

Netherlands; 103/9 (20 overs)	v	South Africa; 106/6 (18.5 overs)
Sybrand Engelbrecht 40 (45); Ottneil Baartman 4/11 (4 overs)		David Miller 59* (51); Vivian Kingma 2/12 (4 overs)

South Africa won by 4 wickets
Nassau County International Cricket Stadium, East Meadow
Umpires: Chris Gaffaney (NZ) and Sharfuddoula (Ban)
Player of the match: David Miller (SA)

- South Africa won the toss and elected to field.

13 June 2024
10:30 UTC−4
Scorecard

Bangladesh; 159/5 (20 overs)	v	Netherlands; 134/8 (20 overs)
Shakib Al Hasan 64* (46); Paul van Meekeren 2/15 (4 overs)		Sybrand Engelbrecht 33 (22); Rishad Hossain 3/33 (4 overs)

Bangladesh won by 25 runs
Arnos Vale Stadium, Kingstown
Umpires: Chris Brown (NZ) and Jayaraman Madanagopal (Ind)
Player of the match: Shakib Al Hasan (Ban)

- Netherlands won the toss and elected to field.

16 June 2024
20:30 UTC−4 (N)
Scorecard

Sri Lanka; 201/6 (20 overs)	v	Netherlands; 118 (16.4 overs)
Charith Asalanka 46 (21); Logan van Beek 2/45 (4 overs)		Michael Levitt 31 (23); Nuwan Thushara 3/24 (3.4 overs)

Sri Lanka won by 83 runs
Daren Sammy Cricket Ground, Gros Islet
Umpires: Allahudien Paleker (SA) and Alex Wharf (Eng)
Player of the match: Charith Asalanka (SL)

- Netherlands won the toss and elected to field.

=== 2026 World Cup ===
Squad and kit

- Scott Edwards (c, wk)
- Colin Ackermann
- Noah Croes
- Bas de Leede
- Michael Levitt
- Zach Lion-Cachet
- Aryan Dutt
- Fred Klaassen
- Kyle Klein
- Max O'Dowd
- Logan van Beek
- Timm van der Gugten
- Roelof van der Merwe
- Paul van Meekeren
- Saqib Zulfiqar

2026 kit

Results

First stage (Group A)					Super 8		Semifinal	Final	Overall Result
Opposition Result	Opposition Result	Opposition Result	Opposition Result	Rank	Opposition Result	Rank	Opposition Result	Opposition Result	Overall Result
Pakistan; Lost by 3 wickets	Namibia; Won by 7 wickets	United States; Lost by 93 runs	India; Lost by 17 runs	4	Did not advance				Group stage
Source: Cricinfo

Scorecards

Group stage (Group A)

Match 1
7 February 2026
11:00 UTC+5:30
Scorecard

Netherlands; 147 (19.5 overs)	v	Pakistan; 148/7 (19.3 overs)
Scott Edwards 37 (29); Salman Mirza 3/24 (3.5 overs)		Sahibzada Farhan 47 (31); Paul van Meekeren 2/20 (4 overs)

Pakistan won by 3 wickets
Sinhalese Sports Club Cricket Ground, Colombo
Attendance: 5,000
Umpires: Kumar Dharmasena (SL) and Wayne Knights (NZ)
Player of the match: Faheem Ashraf (Pak)

- Pakistan won the toss and elected to field.

Match 10
10 February 2026
11:00 UTC+5:30
Scorecard

Namibia; 156/8 (20 overs)	v	Netherlands; 159/3 (18 overs)
Jan Nicol Loftie-Eaton 42 (38); Logan van Beek 2/13 (3 overs)		Bas de Leede 72* (48); Bernard Scholtz 1/27 (4 overs)

Netherlands won by 7 wickets
Arun Jaitley Cricket Stadium, New Delhi
Umpires: Adrian Holdstock (SA) and Langton Rusere (Zim)
Player of the match: Bas de Leede (Ned)

- Netherlands won the toss and elected to field.
- Willem Myburgh (Nam) made his T20I debut.
- This was Namibia's maiden international game in India.
- Ruben Trumpelmann (Nam) took his 50th wicket in T20Is.

Match 21
13 February 2026
19:00 UTC+5:30 (N)
Scorecard

United States; 196/6 (20 overs)	v	Netherlands; 103 (15.5 overs)
Saiteja Mukkamalla 79 (51); Bas de Leede 3/37 (4 overs)		Bas de Leede 23 (17); Harmeet Singh Baddhan 4/21 (4 overs)

United States won by 93 runs
M. A. Chidambaram Stadium, Chennai
Attendance: 18,955
Umpires: K. N. Ananthapadmanabhan (Ind) and Nitin Menon (Ind)
Player of the match: Harmeet Singh Baddhan (USA)

- Netherlands won the toss and elected to field.
- This was the largest winning margin in a T20 World Cup match by an associate nation.

Match 36
18 February 2026
19:00 UTC+5:30 (N)
Scorecard

India; 193/6 (20 overs)	v	Netherlands; 176/7 (20 overs)
Shivam Dube 66 (31); Logan van Beek 3/56 (4 overs)		Bas de Leede 33 (23); Varun Chakravarthy 3/14 (3 overs)

India won by 17 runs
Narendra Modi Stadium, Ahmedabad
Attendance: 70,000
Umpires: Sam Nogajski (Aus) and Allahuddien Paleker (SA)
Player of the match: Shivam Dube (Ind)

- India won the toss and elected to bat.
- India extended their record winning-streaks in T20 World Cups to 12 consecutive matches, and 17 in ICC limited-overs tournaments.

== Records and statistics ==
=== Team records ===
Highest innings totals
Score	Opponent	Venue	Season
193/4 (13.5 overs)	Ireland	Sylhet	2014
176/7 (20 overs)	India	Ahmedabad	2026
164/4 (20 overs)	Namibia	Abu Dhabi	2021
163/6 (20 overs)	England	Lord's	2009
159/3 (18 overs)	Namibia	Delhi	2026
Last updated: 8 March 2026

=== Most appearances ===
This list consists of players with the most matches at the T20 World Cup. Logan van Beek holds the record for the most appearances for the Netherlands, having played 24 matches. Scott Edwards has captained the side in 16 matches, the most by any player for the team at the tournament.

Most matches
Matches	Player	Period
24	Logan van Beek	2014–2026
19	Bas de Leede	2021–2026
19	Scott Edwards	2021–2026
19	Max O'Dowd	2021–2026
18	Tom Cooper	2014–2022
Last updated: 8 March 2026

=== Batting records ===
Most runs
Runs	Player	Mat	Inn	Avg	100s	50s	Period
489	Max O'Dowd	19	19	28.76	—N/a	5	2021–2026
353	Stephan Myburgh	15	14	25.21	—N/a	3	2014–2022
353	Tom Cooper	18	17	25.21	—N/a	1	2014–2022
297	Colin Ackermann	15	15	21.21	—N/a	1	2021–2026
281	Scott Edwards	19	19	18.73	—N/a	—N/a	2021–2026
Last updated: 8 March 2026

Highest individual innings
Score	Player	Opponent	Venue	Year
72*	Tom Cooper	Zimbabwe	Sylhet	2014
72*	Bas de Leede	Namibia	Delhi	2026
71*	Max O'Dowd	Sri Lanka	Geelong	2022
70*	Max O'Dowd	Namibia	Abu Dhabi	2021
63	Stephan Myburgh	Ireland	Sylhet	2014
Last updated: 8 March 2026

Most 50+ scores
Fifties	Player	Period
5	Max O'Dowd	2021–2026
3	Stephan Myburgh	2014–2022
1	Colin Ackermann	2021–2026
1	Tom Cooper	2014–2022
1	Bas de Leede	2021–2026
Last updated: 8 March 2026

=== Bowling records ===
Most wickets
Wickets	Player	Matches	Avg.	Econ.	4W	5W	Period
25	Paul van Meekeren	17	14.00	6.03	1	0	2016–2026
22	Logan van Beek	24	27.63	8.60	0	0	2014–2026
21	Bas de Leede	19	19.09	8.12	0	0	2021–2026
15	Timm van der Gugten	14	21.33	7.80	0	0	2014–2026
12	Fred Klaassen	13	24.33	6.46	0	0	2021–2026
12	Ahsan Malik	9	14.25	6.61	0	1	2014–2016
Last updated: 8 March 2026

Best innings figures
Player	Bowling figures	Opponent	Venue	Year
Ahsan Malik	5/19 (4 overs)	South Africa	Chattogram	2014
Paul van Meekeren	4/11 (2 overs)	Ireland	Dharamsala	2016
Logan van Beek	3/9 (2 overs)	England	Chattogram	2014
Brandon Glover	3/9 (2 overs)	South Africa	Adelaide	2022
Mudassar Bukhari	3/12 (3.4 overs)	England	Chattogram	2014
Last updated: 8 March 2026

=== Partnership records ===
Highest partnerships by runs
Runs	Players	Opposition	Venue	Season
91 (1st wicket)	Stephan Myburgh & Peter Borren	v Ireland	Sylhet	2014
82 (3rd wicket)	Max O'Dowd & Colin Ackermann	v Namibia	Abu Dhabi	2021
73 (2nd wicket)	Max O'Dowd & Tom Cooper	v Zimbabwe	Adelaide	2022
70 (3rd wicket)	Bas de Leede & Colin Ackermann	v Namibia	Delhi	2026
69 (1st wicket)	Michael Swart & Stephan Myburgh	v United Arab Emirates	Sylhet	2014
Last updated: 8 March 2026

=== Wicket-keeping records ===
Most dismissals
Dismissals	Player	Matches	Cat.	St.	Period
18	Scott Edwards	19	17	1	2021–2026
8	Wesley Barresi	10	8	0	2014–2016
Last updated: 8 March 2026

=== Fielding records ===
Most catches
Catches	Player	Matches	Period
13	Logan van Beek	24	2014–2026
10	Roelof van der Merwe	16	2016–2026
7	Peter Borren	12	2009–2016
7	Pieter Seelaar	15	2009–2021
7	Bas de Leede	19	2021–2026
Last updated: 8 March 2026

== See also ==
- Netherlands at the Cricket World Cup
- ICC Men's T20 World Cup
