= 2020–21 Nepal Tri-Nation Series =

International cricket tournament

- Date: 17–24 April 2021
- Location: Nepal
- Result: Nepal won the series
- Player of the series: (Nepal) Kushal Bhurtel
Teams
Malaysia	Nepal	Netherlands
Captains
Ahmad Faiz	Gyanendra Malla	Pieter Seelaar
Most runs
Virandeep Singh (120)	Kushal Bhurtel (278)	Max O'Dowd (172)
Most wickets
Muhammad Wafiq (3) Anwar Rahman (3)	Sandeep Lamichhane (13)	Sebastiaan Braat (5)

The 2020–21 Nepal Tri-Nation Series was a Twenty20 international cricket tournament that took place in April 2021 in Nepal. The participating teams were Nepal, Malaysia and the Netherlands. The matches were all played at the Tribhuvan University International Cricket Ground in Kirtipur. The tournament was played in a double round-robin format, followed by a final between the top two sides.

The penultimate round-robin match, between Malaysia and the Netherlands, ended in a tie. It was a rain-curtailed game with no Super Over taking place due to the lost time. This result meant that the Netherlands and Nepal advanced to the final. Nepal defeated the Netherlands in the final by 142 runs to win the series.

== Squads ==
Malaysia	Nepal	Netherlands
Ahmad Faiz (c); Virandeep Singh (vc); Anwar Arudin; Syed Aziz; Ainool Hafizs; Khizar Hayat; Syazrul Idrus; Dhivendran Mogan; Sharvin Muniandy; Anwar Rahman; Aminuddin Ramly; Fitri Sham; Shafiq Sharif; Pavandeep Singh; Muhammad Wafiq	Gyanendra Malla (c); Dipendra Singh Airee (vc); Kamal Singh Airee; Shahab Alam; Binod Bhandari; Sushan Bhari; Kushal Bhurtel; Abinash Bohara; Sundeep Jora; Sompal Kami; Karan KC; ~~Paras Khadka~~; Sandeep Lamichhane; Kushal Malla; Aarif Sheikh; Aasif Sheikh	Pieter Seelaar (c); Philippe Boissevain; Sebastiaan Braat; Ben Cooper; Bas de Leede; Julian de Mey; Aryan Dutt; Scott Edwards; Vivian Kingma; Max O'Dowd; Vikramjit Singh; Antonius Staal; Paul van Meekeren; Tobias Visee

Netherlands coach Ryan Campbell selected a squad missing several English county-based players and the New Zealand-based Logan van Beek. Malaysia's coach Bilal Asad named an experienced squad including captain Ahmad Faiz, vice-captain Virandeep Singh and former national captain Anwar Arudin. The Cricket Association of Nepal (CAN) initially named a preliminary squad of twenty players, with senior players Basant Regmi and Sharad Vesawkar rested. Nepal announced their final squad of fifteen players on 14 April. The day before the tournament, Paras Khadka was ruled out of the series due to a shoulder injury and replaced by Sundeep Jora.

== Round robin ==
=== Points table ===
Team	P	W	L	T	NR	Pts	NRR
Nepal	4	3	1	0	0	6	+2.507
Netherlands	4	2	1	1	0	5	–0.425
Malaysia	4	0	3	1	0	1	–2.359

Source: ESPN Cricinfo

=== Fixtures ===
17 April 2021
13:15
Scorecard

Netherlands; 136/4 (20 overs)	v	Nepal; 141/1 (15 overs)
Bas de Leede 41 (49); Sandeep Lamichhane 2/22 (4 overs)		Kushal Bhurtel 62 (46); Julian de Mey 1/35 (4 overs)

Nepal won by 9 wickets
Tribhuvan University International Cricket Ground, Kirtipur
Umpires: Buddhi Pradhan (Nep) and Durga Subedi (Nep)
Player of the match: Kushal Bhurtel (Nep)

- Nepal won the toss and elected to field.
- Shahab Alam, Kushal Bhurtel, Aasif Sheikh (Nep), Julian de Mey and Aryan Dutt (Ned) all made their T20I debuts.

18 April 2021
12:15
Scorecard

Netherlands; 191/2 (20 overs)	v	Malaysia; 176/8 (20 overs)
Max O'Dowd 133* (73); Pavandeep Singh 1/22 (3 overs)		Virandeep Singh 87 (53); Aryan Dutt 2/14 (2 overs)

Netherlands won by 15 runs
Tribhuvan University International Cricket Ground, Kirtipur
Umpires: Himal Giri (Nep) and Vinay Kumar Jha (Nep)
Player of the match: Max O'Dowd (Ned)

- Netherlands won the toss and elected to bat.
- Max O'Dowd became the first batsman for the Netherlands to score a century in T20Is.

19 April 2021
13:15
Scorecard

Malaysia; 109 (16.5 overs)	v	Nepal; 113/1 (12.1 overs)
Syed Aziz 27 (24); Karan KC 3/17 (3 overs)		Kushal Bhurtel 61* (41); Virandeep Singh 1/7 (1 over)

Nepal won by 9 wickets
Tribhuvan University International Cricket Ground, Kirtipur
Umpires: Sanjay Gurung (Nep) and Durga Subedi (Nep)
Player of the match: Karan KC (Nep)

- Nepal won the toss and elected to field.

20 April 2021
13:15
Scorecard

Nepal; 206/6 (20 overs)	v	Netherlands; 209/7 (19.3 overs)
Kushal Bhurtel 62 (46); Pieter Seelaar 2/37 (4 overs)		Bas de Leede 81* (42); Sandeep Lamichhane 4/48 (4 overs)

Netherlands won by 3 wickets
Tribhuvan University International Cricket Ground, Kirtipur
Umpires: Vinay Kumar Jha (Nep) and Buddhi Pradhan (Nep)
Player of the match: Bas de Leede (Ned)

- Nepal won the toss and elected to bat.
- Kushal Bhurtel became the first player to score a half century in each of his first three T20I matches.

21 April 2021
12:15
Scorecard

Netherlands; 107/4 (13 overs)	v	Malaysia; 91/4 (10 overs)
Ben Cooper 54* (32); Muhammad Wafiq 2/13 (3 overs)		Syed Aziz 30 (26); Sebastiaan Braat 2/14 (2 overs)

Match tied (DLS method)
Tribhuvan University International Cricket Ground, Kirtipur
Umpires: Sanjay Gurung (Nep) and Durga Subedi (Nep)
Player of the match: Sebastiaan Braat (Ned)

- Malaysia won the toss and elected to field.
- Malaysia were set a revised target of 92 runs from 10 overs due to rain.

22 April 2021
13:15
Scorecard

Nepal; 217/7 (20 overs)	v	Malaysia; 148 (19.1 overs)
Karan KC 45 (13); Syed Aziz 2/4 (1 over)		Aminuddin Ramly 41 (18); Kamal Singh Airee 3/16 (3.1 overs)

Nepal won by 69 runs
Tribhuvan University International Cricket Ground, Kirtipur
Umpires: Vinay Kumar Jha (Nep) and Buddhi Pradhan (Nep)
Player of the match: Sompal Kami (Nep)

- Malaysia won the toss and elected to field.
- Kamal Singh Airee (Nep) made his T20I debut.

== Final ==
24 April 2021
13:15
Scorecard

Nepal; 238/3 (20 overs)	v	Netherlands; 96 (17.2 overs)
Kushal Bhurtel 77 (53); Philippe Boissevain 2/43 (4 overs)		Sebastiaan Braat 26* (27); Karan KC 3/11 (3 overs)

Nepal won by 142 runs
Tribhuvan University International Cricket Ground, Kirtipur
Umpires: Buddhi Pradhan (Nep) and Durga Subedi (Nep)
Player of the match: Karan KC (Nep)

- Netherlands won the toss and elected to field.
- Kushal Malla became the youngest player to score a half century in a T20I; he already held the record in ODI matches.
