= Dutch cricket team in Namibia in 2019–20 =

International cricket tour

	Namibia	Netherlands
- Dates: 25 March – 1 April 2020
Captains		Pieter Seelaar

One Day International series

Twenty20 International series

The Netherlands cricket team were scheduled to tour Namibia in March and April 2020, to play four Twenty20 Internationals (T20Is) and two One Day Internationals (ODIs) at the Wanderers Cricket Ground in Windhoek. However, on 13 March 2020, the tour was cancelled due to the COVID-19 pandemic. The tour is now scheduled to take place in 2020–21, subject to COVID-19 restrictions.

== Squads ==
ODIs		T20Is	
Namibia	Netherlands	Namibia	Netherlands
	Pieter Seelaar (c); Colin Ackermann; Philippe Boissevain; Sebastiaan Braat; Ben Cooper; Bas de Leede; Vivian Kingma; Max O'Dowd; Vikramjit Singh; Tobias Visee (wk); Timm van der Gugten; Roelof van der Merwe; Paul van Meekeren; Sikander Zulfiqar		Pieter Seelaar (c); Colin Ackermann; Philippe Boissevain; Sebastiaan Braat; Ben Cooper; Bas de Leede; Vivian Kingma; Max O'Dowd; Vikramjit Singh; Tobias Visee (wk); Timm van der Gugten; Roelof van der Merwe; Paul van Meekeren; Sikander Zulfiqar

== T20I series ==
=== 1st T20I ===
25 March 2020
14:30 (D/N)
Scorecard

Namibia	v	Netherlands

Wanderers Cricket Ground, Windhoek

=== 2nd T20I ===
26 March 2020
14:30 (D/N)
Scorecard

Namibia	v	Netherlands

Wanderers Cricket Ground, Windhoek

=== 3rd T20I ===
28 March 2020
10:00
Scorecard

Namibia	v	Netherlands

Wanderers Cricket Ground, Windhoek

=== 4th T20I ===
1 April 2020
10:00
Scorecard

Namibia	v	Netherlands

Wanderers Cricket Ground, Windhoek

== ODI series ==
=== 1st ODI ===
29 March 2020
10:00
Scorecard

Namibia	v	Netherlands

Wanderers Cricket Ground, Windhoek

=== 2nd ODI ===
31 March 2020
10:00
Scorecard

Namibia	v	Netherlands

Wanderers Cricket Ground, Windhoek
