= Scottish cricket team against the Netherlands in the UAE in 2015–16 =

	Scotland	Netherlands
- Date: 5 February 2016
Captains	Preston Mommsen	Peter Borren

Twenty20 International series
- Results: Scotland won the 1-match series 1–0

The Scottish cricket team toured the United Arab Emirates to play the Netherlands in February 2016. The tour consisted of a Twenty20 International (T20I) match. The match was in preparation for the World Twenty20 in India in March and was played at the ICC Academy Ground in Dubai. Scotland won the one-off match by 37 runs.

== Squads ==
Scotland	Netherlands
Preston Mommsen (c); Richie Berrington; Kyle Coetzer; Matthew Cross (wk); Josh Davey; Alasdair Evans; Con de Lange; Michael Leask; Matt Machan; Calum MacLeod; George Munsey; Safyaan Sharif; Robert Taylor; Bradley Wheal; Mark Watt	Peter Borren (c); Rahil Ahmed; Ahsan Malik; Wesley Barresi; Mudassar Bukhari; Ben Cooper; Quirijn Gunning; Vivian Kingma; Stephan Myburgh; Max O'Dowd; Michael Rippon; Pieter Seelaar; Roelof van der Merwe; Paul van Meekeren; Sikander Zulfiqar

== T20I series ==
=== Only T20I ===
5 February 2016
Scorecard

Scotland; 140/5 (20 overs)	v	Netherlands; 103 (18.2 overs)
Matt Machan 43 (41); Michael Swart 1/14 (2 overs)		Ben Cooper 32 (33); Mark Watt 5/27 (4 overs)

Scotland won by 37 runs
ICC Academy Ground, Dubai
Umpires: C. K. Nandan (Ind) and Sarika Prasad (Sin)
Player of the match: Mark Watt (Sco)

- Scotland won the toss and elected to bat.
- Vivian Kingma (Ned) made his T20I debut.
- Mark Watt (Sco) took his first five-wicket haul in T20I matches.

== See also ==
- Scottish cricket team in the United Arab Emirates in 2015–16
