= 2019–20 Ireland Tri-Nation Series =

Cricket tournament

- Date: 15–20 September 2019
- Location: Ireland
- Result: Ireland won the series
- Player of the series: (Scotland) George Munsey
Teams
Ireland	Netherlands	Scotland
Captains
Gary Wilson	Pieter Seelaar	Kyle Coetzer (Note: Richie Berrington captained Scotland for the 6th match.)
Most runs
Andrew Balbirnie (129)	Pieter Seelaar (104)	George Munsey (194)
Most wickets
George Dockrell (4)	Shane Snater (5)	Hamza Tahir (7)

The 2019–20 Ireland Tri-Nation Series was a cricket tournament that was held in September 2019 in Ireland. It was a tri-nation series that featured Ireland, the Netherlands and Scotland, with all the matches played as Twenty20 Internationals (T20Is). The series was arranged after the planned first edition of the Euro T20 Slam was cancelled. The matches were used by all the teams as part of their preparation for the 2019 ICC Men's T20 World Cup Qualifier tournament. Both Cricket Scotland and the KNCB thanked Cricket Ireland for agreeing to host the tournament, following the cancellation of the Euro T20 Slam.

The fifth match of the series saw Scotland beat the Netherlands by six wickets. The result meant that the Netherlands were knocked out of contention of winning the series. Ireland beat Scotland by one run in the sixth and final match, to win the series. Scotland's George Munsey was named as the player of the series for his batting, which included a century against the Netherlands in the second match.

== Squads ==
Ireland	Netherlands	Scotland
Gary Wilson (c); Mark Adair; Andrew Balbirnie; David Delany; Gareth Delany; George Dockrell; Shane Getkate; ~~Jacob Mulder~~; Kevin O'Brien; Boyd Rankin; Simi Singh; Paul Stirling; Harry Tector; Stuart Thompson; Lorcan Tucker; Craig Young	Pieter Seelaar (c); Philippe Boissevain; Ben Cooper; Scott Edwards (wk); Clayton Floyd; Brandon Glover; Fred Klaassen; Bas de Leede; Paul van Meekeren; Max O'Dowd; Vikramjit Singh; Shane Snater; Antonius Staal; Tobias Visee	Kyle Coetzer (c); Richie Berrington; Matthew Cross; Alasdair Evans; Ollie Hairs; Michael Leask; Calum MacLeod; George Munsey; Adrian Neill; Safyaan Sharif; Tom Sole; Hamza Tahir; Craig Wallace; Mark Watt

Jacob Mulder was ruled out of Ireland's squad due to injury and was replaced by Simi Singh.

== Points table ==
Pos	Team	Pld	W	L	T	NR	Pts	NRR
1	Ireland	4	2	1	0	1	10	0.247
2	Scotland	4	2	2	0	0	8	1.335
3	Netherlands	4	1	2	0	1	6	−2.031

== Matches ==
=== 1st match ===
15 September 2019
13:30
Scorecard

Ireland	v	Netherlands

Match abandoned
The Village, Dublin
Umpires: Rizwan Akram (Ned) and David McLean (Sco)

- No toss.
- No play was possible due to rain.

=== 2nd match ===
16 September 2019
13:30
Scorecard

Scotland; 252/3 (20 overs)	v	Netherlands; 194/7 (20 overs)
George Munsey 127* (56); Shane Snater 3/42 (4 overs)		Pieter Seelaar 96* (49); Alasdair Evans 2/19 (4 overs)

Scotland won by 58 runs
The Village, Dublin
Umpires: David McLean (Sco) and Alan Neill (Ire)
Player of the match: George Munsey (Sco)

- Netherlands won the toss and elected to field.
- Ollie Hairs (Sco) and Clayton Floyd (Ned) both made their T20I debuts.
- George Munsey (Sco) scored his first century in T20Is, and the second-fastest century in T20I cricket, coming from 41 balls.
- George Munsey and Kyle Coetzer scored the highest partnership for any wicket for Scotland in T20Is, and the third-highest partnership overall, with 200 runs.
- This was Scotland's highest total in T20Is.

=== 3rd match ===
17 September 2019
13:30
Scorecard

Scotland; 193/7 (20 overs)	v	Ireland; 194/6 (17.4 overs)
Calum MacLeod 72 (42); Boyd Rankin 3/29 (4 overs)		Andrew Balbirnie 64 (32); Mark Watt 3/38 (4 overs)

Ireland won by 4 wickets
The Village, Dublin
Umpires: Rizwan Akram (Ned) and Alan Neill (Ire)

- Scotland won the toss and elected to bat.
- David Delany and Harry Tector (Ire) both made their T20I debuts.

=== 4th match ===
18 September 2019
13:30
Scorecard

Ireland; 181/7 (20 overs)	v	Netherlands; 183/4 (19.1 overs)
Harry Tector 60 (40); Brandon Glover 2/19 (4 overs)		Ben Cooper 91* (56); George Dockrell 3/23 (3.1 overs)

Netherlands won by 6 wickets
The Village, Dublin
Umpires: Rizwan Akram (Ned) and David McLean (Sco)
Player of the match: Ben Cooper (Ned)

- Ireland won the toss and elected to bat.
- Ben Cooper and Max O'Dowd scored the joint-highest partnership for any wicket for the Netherlands in T20Is.
- This was the Netherlands' highest successful run chase against Ireland in T20Is.

=== 5th match ===
19 September 2019
13:30
Scorecard

Netherlands; 123 (20 overs)	v	Scotland; 126/4 (13.2 overs)
Bas de Leede 30 (36); Hamza Tahir 4/30 (4 overs)		Richie Berrington 27* (19); Paul van Meekeren 2/32 (4 overs)

Scotland won by 6 wickets
The Village, Dublin
Umpires: David McLean (Sco) and Alan Neill (Ire)

- Netherlands won the toss and elected to bat.
- Vikramjit Singh (Ned) and Tom Sole (Sco) both made their T20I debuts.

=== 6th match ===
20 September 2019
13:30
Scorecard

Ireland; 186/9 (20 overs)	v	Scotland; 185/6 (20 overs)
Kevin O'Brien 63 (45); Tom Sole 2/26 (4 overs)		Richie Berrington 76 (43); Mark Adair 2/30 (4 overs)

Ireland won by 1 run
The Village, Dublin
Umpires: Rizwan Akram (Ned) and Alan Neill (Ire)

- Scotland won the toss and elected to field.
