= Nepalese cricket team in the Netherlands in 2015 =

International cricket tour

| | Netherlands | Nepal |
- Dates: 30 June 2015 – 3 July 2015
| Captains | Peter Borren | Paras Khadka |

Twenty20 International series
- Results: Netherlands won the 4-match series 3–1
| Most runs | Stephan Myburgh (138) | Paras Khadka (137) |
| Most wickets | Ahsan Malik (11) | Basant Regmi (5) |
- Player of the series: Ahsan Malik (Ned) and Paras Khadka (Nep)

The Nepalese cricket team toured the Netherlands from 30 June to 3 July 2015 to play four Twenty20 International (T20I) matches. The Netherlands won the series 3–1. The tour was a warm-up for the 2015 ICC World Twenty20 Qualifier which took place in Ireland later in July.

== Squads ==
| Netherlands | Nepal |
|---|---|
| Peter Borren (c); Wesley Barresi (vc); Rahil Ahmed; Mudassar Bukhari; Ben Cooper; Ahsan Malik; Roelof van der Merwe; Stephan Myburgh; Max O'Dowd; Michael Rippon; Pieter Seelaar; Michael Swart; Timm van der Gugten; Paul van Meekeren; Thijs van Schelven; Tobias Visee | Paras Khadka (c); Gyanendra Malla (vc); Pradeep Airee; Binod Bhandari; Shakti Gauchan; Karan KC; Sompal Kami; Avinash Karn; Subash Khakurel; Siddhant Lohani; Gyanendra Malla; Anil Mandal; Jitendra Mukhiya; Sagar Pun; Rajesh Pulami; Basanta Regmi; Sharad Vesawkar |

== T20I series ==
=== 1st T20I ===
30 June 2015
Scorecard

| Netherlands; 134/5 (20 overs) | v | Nepal; 116/7 (20 overs) |
| Stephan Myburgh 67* (60); Basant Regmi 2/34 (4 overs) | | Paras Khadka 45* (42); Ahsan Malik 3/23 (4 overs) |

Netherlands won by 18 runs
VRA Cricket Ground, Amstelveen
Umpires: Sarika Prasad (Sin) and Chettithody Shamshuddin (Ind)

- Netherlands won the toss and elected to bat.
- Pradeep Airee, Karan KC and Avinash Karn (all Nep) made their T20I debuts.

=== 2nd T20I ===
1 July 2015
Scorecard

| Netherlands; 172/4 (20 overs) | v | Nepal; 69 (17.4 overs) |
| Michael Swart 76* (59); Sompal Kami 2/24 (4 overs) | | Sharad Vesawkar 18 (31); Michael Rippon 3/11 (4 overs) |

Netherlands won by 103 runs
VRA Cricket Ground, Amstelveen
Umpires: Sarika Prasad (Sin) and Chettithody Shamshuddin (Ind)

- Nepal won the toss and elected to field.
- Max O'Dowd, Thijs van Schelven and Tobias Visee (all Ned) made their T20I debuts.
- This was the biggest win in T20Is for the Netherlands.

=== 3rd T20I ===
2 July 2015
Scorecard

| Netherlands; 149/6 (20 overs) | v | Nepal; 131/9 (20 overs) |
| Stephan Myburgh 71* (56); Karan KC 2/24 (3 overs) | | Paras Khadka 36 (28); Ahsan Malik 4/21 (4 overs) |

Netherlands won by 18 runs
Hazelaarweg Stadion, Rotterdam
Umpires: Sarika Prasad (Sin) and Chettithody Shamshuddin (Ind)

- Netherlands won the toss and elected to bat.
- Rahil Ahmed (Ned) made his T20I debut.

=== 4th T20I ===
3 July 2015
Scorecard

| Netherlands; 139/7 (20 overs) | v | Nepal; 141/7 (19.4 overs) |
| Roelof van der Merwe 40* (27); Sagar Pun 3/26 (4 overs) | | Paras Khadka 54 (40); Ahsan Malik 3/25 (3.4 overs) |

Nepal won by 3 wickets
Hazelaarweg Stadion, Rotterdam
Umpires: Sarika Prasad (Sin) and Chettithody Shamshuddin (Ind)

- Netherlands won the toss and elected to bat.
- Anil Mandal (Nep) made his T20I debut.
- Roelof van der Merwe made his T20I debut for the Netherlands. He previously played T20I and ODI cricket for South Africa.
