= West Indian cricket team in the Netherlands in 2022 =

International cricket tour

	Netherlands	West Indies
- Dates: 31 May – 4 June 2022
Captains	Pieter Seelaar	Nicholas Pooran

One Day International series
- Results: West Indies won the 3-match series 3–0
Most runs	Max O'Dowd (179)	Shamarh Brooks (167)
Most wickets	Logan van Beek (4)	Akeal Hosein (8)
- Player of the series: Akeal Hosein (WI)

The West Indies cricket team toured the Netherlands in May and June 2022 to play three One Day International (ODI) matches. The ODI series formed part of the inaugural 2020–2023 ICC Cricket World Cup Super League. All the matches were played at the VRA Cricket Ground in Amstelveen.

Originally, the series was scheduled to take place in June 2020. However, on 22 April 2020, the Dutch government announced that it had banned all events in the country, both sports and cultural, until 1 September 2020 due to the COVID-19 pandemic. In February 2022, the revised fixtures for the tour were confirmed. It was the first time that the West Indies toured the Netherlands for a three-match ODI series. The West Indies had previously played two 55-over friendly matches in the Netherlands in 1991.

In April 2022, Kieron Pollard announced his retirement from international cricket, with Nicholas Pooran named as the new limited overs captain for the West Indies.

The visitors won all three ODIs by comfortable margins. The West Indies won the first ODI match by seven wickets, with Shai Hope scoring 119 not out. The West Indies then won the second match by five wickets, to win the series with a match to spare. The West Indies won the final match by 20 runs to win the series 3–0.

== Squads ==
ODIs
Netherlands	West Indies
Pieter Seelaar (c); Musa Ahmed; Shariz Ahmad; Logan van Beek; Philippe Boissevain; Aryan Dutt; Scott Edwards (wk); Clayton Floyd; Vivian Kingma; Fred Klaassen; Ryan Klein; Bas de Leede; Teja Nidamanuru; Max O'Dowd; Vikramjit Singh; Antonius Staal	Nicholas Pooran (c); Shai Hope (vc); Nkrumah Bonner; Shamarh Brooks; Keacy Carty; Akeal Hosein; Alzarri Joseph; Brandon King; Shermon Lewis; Kyle Mayers; Anderson Phillip; ~~Rovman Powell~~; Jayden Seales; ~~Romario Shepherd~~; Hayden Walsh Jr.

Rovman Powell and Romario Shepherd were both unable to play for the West Indies due to visa delays. Both players had travelled from India to London following the conclusion of the 2022 Indian Premier League, and did not join up with the rest of the squad.

== ODI series ==
=== 1st ODI ===
31 May 2022
11:00
Scorecard

Netherlands; 240/7 (45 overs)	v	West Indies; 249/3 (43.1 overs)
Teja Nidamanuru 58* (51); Akeal Hosein 2/29 (9 overs)		Shai Hope 119* (130); Logan van Beek 2/49 (8 overs)

West Indies won by 7 wickets (DLS method)
VRA Cricket Ground, Amstelveen
Umpires: Rizwan Akram (Ned) and Richard Illingworth (Eng)
Player of the match: Shai Hope (WI)

- West Indies won the toss and elected to field.
- West Indies were set a revised target of 247 runs from 45 overs due to rain.
- Teja Nidamanuru (Ned) and Keacy Carty (WI) both made their ODI debuts.
- World Cup Super League points: West Indies 10, Netherlands 0.

=== 2nd ODI ===
2 June 2022
11:00
Scorecard

Netherlands; 214 (48.3 overs)	v	West Indies; 217/5 (45.3 overs)
Scott Edwards 68 (89); Akeal Hosein 4/39 (10 overs)		Brandon King 91* (90); Bas de Leede 2/46 (8 overs)

West Indies won by 5 wickets
VRA Cricket Ground, Amstelveen
Umpires: Nitin Bathi (Ned) and Richard Illingworth (Eng)
Player of the match: Brandon King (WI)

- Netherlands won the toss and elected to bat.
- Shariz Ahmad (Ned) made his ODI debut.
- World Cup Super League points: West Indies 10, Netherlands 0.

=== 3rd ODI ===
4 June 2022
11:00
Scorecard

West Indies; 308/5 (50 overs)	v	Netherlands; 288 (49.5 overs)
Kyle Mayers 120 (106); Bas de Leede 1/34 (5 overs)		Max O'Dowd 89 (121); Shermon Lewis 3/67 (9.5 overs)

West Indies won by 20 runs
VRA Cricket Ground, Amstelveen
Umpires: Adriaan van den Dries (Ned) and Richard Illingworth (Eng)
Player of the match: Kyle Mayers (WI)

- West Indies won the toss and elected to bat.
- Shermon Lewis and Jayden Seales (WI) both made their ODI debuts.
- Kyle Mayers (WI) scored his first century in ODIs.
- Shamarh Brooks (WI) scored his first century in ODIs.
- World Cup Super League points: West Indies 10, Netherlands 0.
