= Emirati cricket team in the Netherlands in 2019 =

International cricket tour

| | Netherlands | United Arab Emirates |
- Dates: 3 – 8 August 2019
| Captains | Pieter Seelaar | Mohammad Naveed (Note: Rameez Shahzad captained the United Arab Emirates in the fourth T20I.) |

Twenty20 International series
- Results: United Arab Emirates won the 4-match series 4–0
| Most runs | Max O'Dowd (148) | Ashfaq Ahmed (210) |
| Most wickets | Sebastiaan Braat (4); Vivian Kingma (4) | Rohan Mustafa (8) |

The United Arab Emirates cricket team toured the Netherlands in August 2019 to play four Twenty20 International (T20I) matches. The fixtures were part of both teams' preparations for the 2019 ICC T20 World Cup Qualifier tournament to be held in the UAE in October-November 2019. For the series, the United Arab Emirates recalled the majority of their squad from the 2019 Global T20 Canada tournament, while the Dutch team chose not to recall their players from Canada, or from the 2019 County Championship in England. The United Arab Emirates won the series 4–0.

== Squads ==
T20Is
| Netherlands | United Arab Emirates |
|---|---|
| Pieter Seelaar (c); Sebastiaan Braat; Philippe Boissevain; Ben Cooper; Scott Edwards; Brandon Glover; Vivian Kingma; Stephan Myburgh; Hidde Overdijk; Max O'Dowd; Antonius Staal; Saqib Zulfiqar; Sikander Zulfiqar | Mohammad Naveed (c); Ashfaq Ahmed; Qadeer Ahmed; Sultan Ahmed; Waheed Ahmed; Mohammad Boota; Darius D'Silva; Zawar Farid; Zahoor Khan; Rohan Mustafa; Ahmed Raza; Ghulam Shabber (wk); Rameez Shahzad; Muhammad Usman |

== T20I series ==
=== 1st T20I ===
3 August 2019
16:00 (D/N)
Scorecard

| United Arab Emirates; 181/5 (20 overs) | v | Netherlands; 168/4 (20 overs) |
| Ashfaq Ahmed 54 (35); Vivian Kingma 2/47 (4 overs) | | Max O'Dowd 51 (35); Rohan Mustafa 2/26 (4 overs) |

United Arab Emirates won by 13 runs
VRA Cricket Ground, Amstelveen
Umpires: Adriaan van den Dries (Ned) and Pim van Liemt (Ned)

- Netherlands won the toss and elected to field.
- Antonius Staal (Ned) and Darius D'Silva (UAE) both made their T20I debuts.

=== 2nd T20I ===
5 August 2019
16:00 (D/N)
Scorecard

| Netherlands; 136/9 (20 overs) | v | United Arab Emirates; 140/5 (19.3 overs) |
| Ben Cooper 46 (38); Rohan Mustafa 3/27 (4 overs) | | Rameez Shahzad 49 (41); Saqib Zulfiqar 1/4 (1 over) |

United Arab Emirates won by 5 wickets
VRA Cricket Ground, Amstelveen
Umpires: Rizwan Akram (Ned) and Huub Jansen (Ned)

- United Arab Emirates won the toss and elected to field.
- Philippe Boissevain, Sebastiaan Braat (Ned) and Waheed Ahmed (UAE) all made their T20I debuts.

=== 3rd T20I ===
6 August 2019
16:00 (D/N)
Scorecard

| United Arab Emirates; 152/8 (20 overs) | v | Netherlands; 138/9 (20 overs) |
| Ashfaq Ahmed 56 (41); Sebastiaan Braat 3/26 (4 overs) | | Max O'Dowd 65 (54); Rohan Mustafa 3/30 (4 overs) |

United Arab Emirates won by 14 runs
Sportpark Westvliet, Voorburg
Umpires: Rizwan Akram (Ned) and Adriaan van den Dries (Ned)

- Netherlands won the toss and elected to field.
- Zawar Farid (UAE) made his T20I debut.

=== 4th T20I ===
8 August 2019
16:00 (D/N)
Scorecard

| Netherlands; 150/6 (20 overs) | v | United Arab Emirates; 153/3 (19.4 overs) |
| Antonius Staal 28* (16); Sultan Ahmed 2/29 (4 overs) | | Ashfaq Ahmed 75 (53); Hidde Overdijk 1/11 (2 overs) |

United Arab Emirates won by 7 wickets
Sportpark Westvliet, Voorburg
Umpires: Huub Jansen (Ned) and Pim van Liemt (Ned)

- Netherlands won the toss and elected to bat.
