= Scottish cricket team in the Netherlands in 2021 =

International cricket tour

	Netherlands	Scotland
- Dates: 19 – 20 May 2021
Captains	Pieter Seelaar	Kyle Coetzer

One Day International series
- Results: 2-match series drawn 1–1
Most runs	Max O'Dowd (90)	George Munsey (106)
Most wickets	Vivian Kingma (5)	Alasdair Evans (6)

The Scotland cricket team toured the Netherlands in May 2021 to play two One Day International (ODI) matches in Rotterdam. Due to the impact of the COVID-19 pandemic, the Netherlands last played an ODI match in June 2019, and Scotland's last ODI match was in December 2019. Originally, the second ODI was scheduled to be played on 21 May, but the fixture was brought forward by one day after bad weather was forecast.

The Netherlands won the first ODI by 14 runs. Scotland won the second ODI by 6 wickets, to draw the series 1–1.

== Squads ==
ODIs
Netherlands	Scotland
Pieter Seelaar (c); Philippe Boissevain; Ben Cooper; Bas de Leede; Julian de Mey; Aryan Dutt; Scott Edwards; Vivian Kingma; Stephan Myburgh; Max O'Dowd; Vikramjit Singh; Antonius Staal; Logan van Beek; Paul van Meekeren; Tobias Visee; Saqib Zulfiqar	Kyle Coetzer (c); Richie Berrington (vc); Dylan Budge; Matthew Cross (wk); Alasdair Evans; Michael Leask; Calum MacLeod; Gavin Main; George Munsey; Adrian Neill; Safyaan Sharif; Hamza Tahir; Craig Wallace; Mark Watt

== ODI series ==
=== 1st ODI ===
19 May 2021
11:00
Scorecard

Netherlands; 163/8 (33 overs)	v	Scotland; 149/8 (33 overs)
Max O'Dowd 82 (102); Gavin Main 2/16 (7 overs)		Richie Berrington 41 (43); Vivian Kingma 3/21 (7 overs)

Netherlands won by 14 runs
Hazelaarweg Stadion, Rotterdam
Umpires: Rizwan Akram (Ned) and Nitin Bathi (Ned)

- Netherlands won the toss and elected to bat.
- The match was reduced to 33 overs per side due to rain.
- Aryan Dutt and Logan van Beek (Ned) both made their ODI debuts.
- Mark Watt took his 100th wicket in international cricket for Scotland.

=== 2nd ODI ===
20 May 2021
11:00
Scorecard

Netherlands; 171 (48.4 overs)	v	Scotland; 172/4 (42.1 overs)
Scott Edwards 56 (67); Alasdair Evans 5/43 (9.4 overs)		George Munsey 79* (100); Vivian Kingma 2/23 (8 overs)

Scotland won by 6 wickets
Hazelaarweg Stadion, Rotterdam
Umpires: Nitin Bathi (Ned) and Adriaan van den Dries (Ned)

- Netherlands won the toss and elected to bat.
- Philippe Boissevain (Ned) made his ODI debut.
- Alasdair Evans (Sco) took his first five-wicket haul in ODIs.
