= Netherlands A cricket team in Ireland in 2021 =

International Cricket Tour

	Ireland	Netherlands
- Dates: 10 May – 13 May 2021
Captains	Harry Tector	Scott Edwards

LA series
- Result: Ireland won the 3-match series 2–1
Most runs	Harry Tector (128)	Tobias Visee (75)
Most wickets	Graeme McCarter (9)	Vivian Kingma (5)

The Netherlands A cricket team toured Ireland in May 2021 to play three unofficial One Day International matches (with List A status) against the Ireland Wolves cricket team. The fixtures of the tour were confirmed by Cricket Ireland on 22 April 2021, with all the three unofficial ODI matches being played at Oak Hill on 10, 12 and 13 May.

The bilateral series was originally used for both teams as the preparation for the World Cup Super League matches between the two sides which was held in June 2021.

On 4 May 2021, the Royal Dutch Cricket Association announced a 14-man squad for the series, with Scott Edwards as the captain. While the next day, Cricket Ireland also confirmed the squads for Ireland Wolves, with Harry Tector named as the captain.

== Squads ==
List A
Ireland Wolves	Netherlands A
Harry Tector (c); Curtis Campher; Peter Chase; George Dockrell; Stephen Doheny; Shane Getkate; Graeme McCarter; Barry McCarthy; James McCollum; William Porterfield; Neil Rock; Tim Tector; Ben White; Craig Young	Scott Edwards (c); Musa Ahmed; Logan van Beek; Philippe Boissevain; Ben Cooper; Aryan Dutt; Vivian Kingma; Ryan Klein; Bas de Leede; Paul van Meekeren; Stephan Myburgh; Vikramjit Singh; Antonius Staal; Tobias Visee

== Series summary ==
Ireland Wolves started their home series with a 94 runs win as Shane Getkate's 74 runs off just 40 balls guided the Wolves to secure 276 runs in 50 overs. In response, Netherlands A could not sustain a partnership as they started to regularly lose wickets in the early overs, with Craig Young the best bowler by the Wolves, who bagged 2 wickets conceding 37 runs.

While in the following match, Netherlands A fought back to level the series, as the low aggregate match ended with Dutch A side's victory by 5 wickets while chasing 95. Vivian Kingma's economic three wicket haul for just 5 runs and the consistent figures of other Dutch bowlers never allowed the Irish batters to settle in the innings.

In the final match, Ireland Wolves won by 5 wickets to claim the series 2–1. This time, Netherlands A had a disappointing first innings as Graeme McCarter claimed 6 for 32 to star in the Wolves' victory.

== List A series ==
=== 1st Unofficial ODI ===
10 May 2021
Scorecard

Ireland Wolves; 276/9	v	Netherlands A 182
Shane Getkate 74* (40); Philippe Boissevain 3/46 (10 overs)		Logan van Beek 59 (76); Shane Getkate 2/26 (5 overas)

Ireland Wolves won by 94 runs
Oak Hill, Wicklow
Umpires: Mark Hawthorne (Ire) and Paul Reynolds (Ire)
Player of the match: Shane Getkate (Ireland Wolves)

- Netherlands A won the toss and elected to field
- Antonius Staal, Musa Ahmed, Philippe Boissevain and Vikramjit Singh (Netherlands A) all made their List A debuts.

=== 2nd Unofficial ODI ===
12 May 2021
Scorecard

Ireland Wolves; 94	v	Netherlands A 98/5
Shane Getkate 32 (53); Vivian Kingma 3/5 (5 overs)		Scott Edwards 36 (31); Peter Chase 2/31 (4 overs)

Netherlands A won by 5 wikcets
Oak Hill, Wicklow
Umpires: Aidan Seaver (Ire) and Mark Hawthorne (Ire)
Player of the match: Vivian Kingma (Netherlands A)

- Ireland Wolves won the toss and elected to bat
- The match was reduced to 40 overs per side due to rain.
- Aryan Dutt (Netherlands A) made his List A debut.

=== 3rd Unofficial ODI ===
13 May 2021
Scorecard

Netherlands A 105	v	Ireland Wolves; 110/5
Ryan Klein 18 (24); Graeme McCarter 6/32 (9.5 overs)		Harry Tector 57* (50); Ryan Klein 2/15 (7 overs)

Ireland Wolves won by 5 wickets
Oak Hill, Wicklow
Umpires: Aidan Seaver (Ire) and Paul Reynolds (Ire)
Player of the match: Graeme McCarter (Ireland Wolves)

- Netherlands A won the toss and elected to bat.

== See also ==
- Ireland Wolves cricket team in Bangladesh in 2020–21
