= Hazelaarweg Stadion =

Sports stadium

Coordinates: 51.9679°N 4.48498°E

Hazelaarweg
- Hazelaarweg Stadion
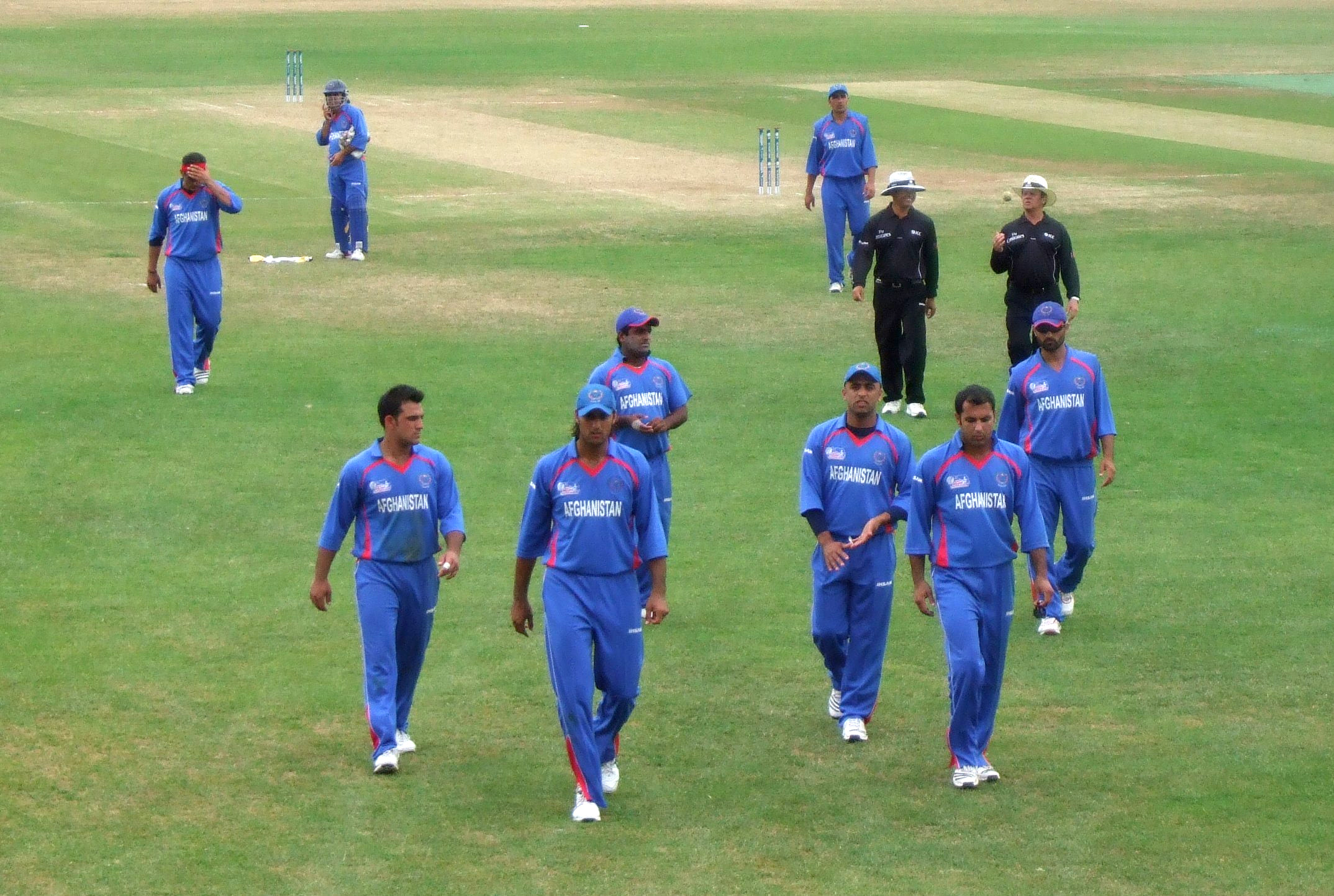
- Afghanistan national cricket team in the Hazelaarweg Stadion

Ground information
- Location: Rotterdam, Netherlands
- Establishment: 2000
- Capacity: 3,500

International information
- First ODI: 18 August 2007: Netherlands v Bermuda
- Last ODI: 21 August 2024: Netherlands v United States
- First T20I: 2 July 2015: Netherlands v Nepal
- Last T20I: 28 August 2024: Netherlands v United States
- Only women's Test: 28 July–1 August 2007: Netherlands v South Africa
- First WT20I: 20 August 2025: Netherlands v Italy
- Last WT20I: 27 August 2025: Ireland v Italy

Team information
HC Rotterdam	(2000-Present)
- As of 21 August 2024; Source: Cricinfo

The Hazelaarweg Stadion is a multi-use stadium in Rotterdam, Netherlands, run by one of the largest field hockey clubs in the Netherlands, HC Rotterdam. It is close to the international cricket ground occupied by VOC Rotterdam.

== Other sports ==
The stadium is currently used mostly for field hockey matches and has hosted matches for the 2001 Men's Champions Trophy. It has the seating capacity for 3,500 spectators and was built in 2000.

== List of five wicket hauls ==
=== One Day Internationals ===
No.	Bowler	Date	Team	Opposing team	Inn	Overs	Runs	Wkts	Econ	Batsmen	Result
1	Alex Cusack	3 July 2010	Ireland	Afghanistan	2	8.1	20	5	2.44	Noor Ali Zadran; Mohammad Shahzad; Asghar Afghan; Samiullah Shinwari; Hamid Hassan	Won
2	Alasdair Evans	20 May 2021	Scotland	Netherlands	1	9.4	43	5	4.44	Max O'Dowd; Ben Cooper; Aryan Dutt; Philippe Boissevain; Scott Edwards	Won
