= List of Netherlands Twenty20 International cricketers =

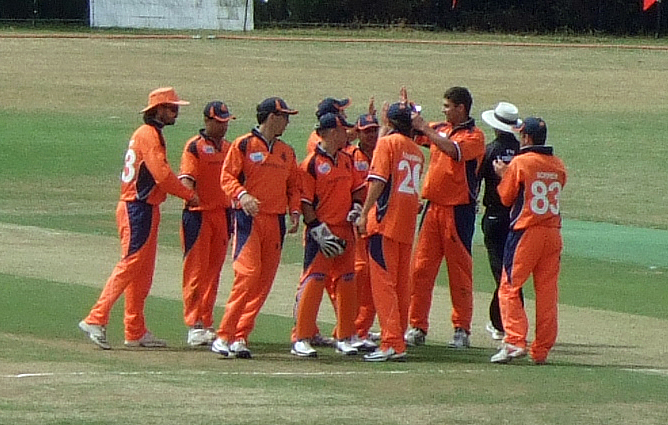
Netherlands national cricket team at Rotterdam, ICC WCL Division One in 2010

A T20I is an international cricket match between two teams that have official Twenty20 International status, as determined by the International Cricket Council. It is played under the rules of Twenty20 cricket and is the shortest form of the game. The Netherlands cricket team played its first T20I match on 2 August 2008, against Kenya as part of the 2008 ICC World Twenty20 Qualifier, winning the match by 19 runs.

This list comprises all members of the Netherlands cricket team who have played at least one T20I match. It is initially arranged in the order in which each player won his first Twenty20 cap. Where more than one player won his first Twenty20 cap in the same match, those players are listed alphabetically by surname.

== Key ==
General

- ‡ – Captain
- † – Wicket-keeper
- First – Year of debut
- Last – Year of latest game
- Mat – Number of matches played

Batting

- Runs – Runs scored in career
- HS – Highest score
- Avg – Runs scored per dismissal
- 50s – Number of half centuries
- 100 – Centuries scored
- * – Batsman remained not out

Bowling

- Balls – Balls bowled in career
- Wkt – Wickets taken in career
- BBI – Best bowling in an innings
- Ave – Average runs per wicket

Fielding

- Ca – Catches taken
- St – Stumpings taken

== Players ==
Statistics are correct as of 18 February 2026.

Netherlands T20I cricketers
General					Batting					Bowling				Fielding		Ref
No.	Name	First	Last	Mat	Runs	HS	Avg	50	100	Balls	Wkt	BBI	Ave	Ca	St	Ref
1	Peter Borren‡	2008	2017	43	638	57	19.33	1	0	526	18	2/19	33.50	28	0	
2	Tom de Grooth	2008	2013	15	163	49	20.37	0	0	–	–	–	–	4	0	
3	Hendrik-Jan Mol	2008	2008	4	0	0	0.00	0	0	9	0	–	–	1	0	
4	Mudassar Bukhari	2008	2016	38	157	28*	8.72	0	0	704	43	4/7	18.13	9	0	
5	Darron Reekers	2008	2009	6	64	29	12.80	0	0	–	–	–	–	2	0	
6	Edgar Schiferli	2008	2010	7	7	5*	3.50	0	0	138	6	3/23	24.33	5	0	
7	Pieter Seelaar‡	2008	2021	77	591	96*	17.38	1	0	1,132	58	4/19	22.24	32	0	
8	Jeroen Smits‡†	2008	2009	6	15	11*	15.00	0	0	–	–	–	–	1	0	
9	Eric Szwarczynski	2008	2013	14	233	45	21.18	0	0	–	–	–	–	4	0	
10	Ryan ten Doeschate	2008	2021	24	533	59	41.00	3	0	210	13	3/23	18.84	4	0	
11	Daan van Bunge	2008	2013	14	90	24	11.25	0	0	14	1	1/14	15.00	4	0	
12	Geert-Maarten Mol	2008	2008	1	–	–	–	–	–	–	–	–	–	0	0	
13	Jelte Schoonheim	2008	2008	1	–	–	–	–	–	–	–	–	–	0	0	
14	Alexei Kervezee	2009	2012	10	289	58*	32.11	2	0	–	–	–	–	4	0	
15	Dirk Nannes	2009	2009	2	6	6	6.00	0	0	48	1	1/26	56.00	0	0	(Note: Dirk Nannes has also played Twenty20 International cricket for Australia. Only his record for the Netherlands is given above.)
16	Bas Zuiderent	2009	2010	6	108	43*	21.60	0	0	–	–	–	–	2	0	
17	Atse Buurman†	2010	2010	4	0	0	0.00	0	0	–	–	–	–	1	1	
18	Mark Jonkman	2010	2010	3	1	1	1.00	0	0	48	4	2/21	11.75	2	0	
19	Mohammad Kashif	2010	2010	3	0	0*	–	0	0	42	4	2/28	13.75	1	0	
20	Wesley Barresi†	2012	2024	46	812	75*	21.94	4	0	34	2	1/3	24.50	28	1	
21	Tom Cooper	2012	2022	33	659	81*	23.53	3	0	114	3	2/18	48.33	12	0	
22	Ahsan Malik	2012	2017	31	28	11*	9.33	0	0	575	44	5/19	16.59	13	0	
23	Stephan Myburgh	2012	2022	45	915	71*	21.78	5	0	–	–	–	–	10	0	
24	Michael Swart‡	2012	2016	26	621	89	27.00	4	0	318	14	2/8	25.07	7	0	
25	Timm van der Gugten	2012	2026	50	168	40*	16.80	0	0	925	52	3/9	22.59	12	0	
26	Tim Gruijters	2012	2013	8	51	21*	25.50	0	0	72	3	1/5	24.66	4	0	
27	Michael Rippon	2013	2018	18	216	42	30.85	0	0	304	15	3/8	20.66	4	0	(Note: Michael Rippon has also played Twenty20 International cricket for New Zealand. Only his record for the Netherlands is given above.)
28	Paul van Meekeren	2013	2026	78	136	24	6.80	0	0	1,554	86	4/11	21.29	24	0	
29	Ben Cooper	2013	2021	58	1,239	91*	28.15	9	0	–	–	–	–	35	0	
30	Logan van Beek	2014	2026	35	108	23	7.20	0	0	648	43	4/27	19.55	17	0	
31	Max O'Dowd	2015	2026	91	2,354	133*	29.06	16	1	106	4	1/7	38.50	35	0	
32	Thijs van Schelven	2015	2015	2	–	–	–	–	–	42	3	2/22	10.00	1	0	
33	Tobias Visee	2015	2021	31	496	78	16.00	3	0	–	–	–	–	5	0	
34	Rahil Ahmed	2015	2015	2	38	25	19.00	0	0	–	–	–	–	0	0	
35	Roelof van der Merwe	2015	2026	58	518	75*	21.58	2	0	1,075	61	4/35	19.27	24	0	(Note: Roelof van der Merwe has also played Twenty20 International cricket for South Africa. Only his record for the Netherlands is given above.)
36	Sikander Zulfiqar	2016	2025	12	70	18	8.75	0	0	60	3	1/9	26.33	4	0	
37	Vivian Kingma	2016	2025	26	10	4	2.50	0	0	524	24	4/21	28.41	2	0	
38	Bas de Leede	2018	2026	49	881	91*	27.53	5	0	644	44	3/17	19.43	23	0	
39	Scott Edwards‡†	2018	2026	86	1,316	99	23.08	2	0	–	–	–	–	69	11	
40	Fred Klaassen	2018	2026	41	48	13	4.36	0	0	840	45	5/19	23.66	17	0	
41	Saqib Zulfiqar	2018	2025	12	77	25*	12.83	0	0	108	4	2/16	28.25	4	0	
42	Shane Snater	2018	2019	13	18	10	3.60	0	0	209	13	3/42	25.92	2	0	
43	Hidde Overdijk	2018	2019	4	13	13	13.00	0	0	48	3	2/23	24.00	2	0	
44	Brandon Glover	2019	2024	25	6	4*	2.00	0	0	491	37	4/12	15.27	5	0	
45	Antonius Staal	2019	2021	14	127	28*	15.87	0	0	–	–	–	–	0	0	
46	Philippe Boissevain	2019	2021	7	14	7*	7.00	0	0	162	6	2/43	38.83	4	0	
47	Sebastiaan Braat	2019	2021	6	32	26*	16.00	0	0	108	9	3/26	18.00	1	0	
48	Clayton Floyd	2019	2022	4	23l4	21	24.00	0	0	66	2	1/14	51.00	0	0	
49	Vikramjit Singh	2019	2025	29	400	52	14.81	0	0	99	6	3/16	27.16	11	0	
50	Colin Ackermann	2019	2026	29	590	62	23.60	1	0	318	11	3/15	32.09	8	0	
51	Julian de Mey	2021	2021	3	–	–	–	–	–	42	1	1/35	67.00	1	0	
52	Aryan Dutt	2021	2026	30	136	30	13.60	0	0	584	30	3/17	22.50	3	0	
53	Teja Nidamanuru	2022	2025	26	244	36	12.84	0	0	24	3	3/30	10.00	5	0	
54	Tim Pringle	2022	2025	22	121	35*	9.30	0	0	420	18	3/20	25.16	6	0	
55	Shariz Ahmad	2022	2025	14	65	16*	13.00	0	0	168	8	2/15	27.75	2	0	
56	Ryan Klein	2022	2025	8	102	36*	20.40	0	0	24	1	1/18	45.00	4	0	
57	Noah Croes	2024	2026	21	228	52*	22.80	1	0	–	–	–	–	17	0	
58	Sybrand Engelbrecht	2024	2024	12	280	75	31.11	1	0	48	5	2/13	14.20	5	0	
59	Michael Levitt	2024	2026	30	945	135	33.75	6	1	96	5	3/11	27.80	8	0	
60	Kyle Klein	2024	2026	20	50	16	6.25	0	0	403	31	4/16	17.48	2	0	
61	Daniel Doram	2024	2025	14	4	2*	–	0	0	294	14	3/14	26.35	4	0	
62	Zach Lion-Cachet	2024	2026	15	146	50	12.16	1	0	176	8	2/5	25.75	3	0	
63	Ben Fletcher	2025	2025	3	–	–	–	–	–	30	2	1/20	30.00	0	0	

== Captains ==
No.	Name	First	Last	Matches	Won	Lost	Tied	No Result	Win%
1	Jeroen Smits	2008	2009	6	3	2	0	1	60.00
2	Peter Borren	2010	2017	37	21	15	0	1	58.33
3	Michael Swart	2013	2013	2	0	2	0	0	0.00
4	Pieter Seelaar	2018	2021	38	17	18	2	1	48.64
5	Scott Edwards	2022	2026	50	23	24	1	2	48.95

== See also ==
- Twenty20 International
- Netherlands national cricket team
- List of Netherlands ODI cricketers
- List of Netherlands first-class cricketers
