= Julian de Mey =

Dutch cricketer

Personal information
- Full name: Julian Lorenzo de Mey
- Batting: Right-handed
- Bowling: Slow left arm orthodox
- Role: Bowler

International information
- National side: Netherlands (2021)
- T20I debut (cap 51): 17 April 2021 v Nepal
- Last T20I: 21 April 2021 v Malaysia

Domestic team information
- Years: Team
- 2020: HBS

Career statistics
Competition	T20I
Matches	3
Runs scored	–
Batting average	–
100s/50s	–
Top score	–
Balls bowled	42
Wickets	1
Bowling average	67.00
5 wickets in innings	0
10 wickets in match	0
Best bowling	1/35
Catches/stumpings	1/–
- Source: ESPNcricinfo, 30 May 2021

Julian Lorenzo de Mey is a Dutch international cricketer. He is a right-handed batsman and a slow left arm orthodox bowler.

In October 2020, he was named in the Netherlands' winter training squad. He also represented the HBS cricket team in the 2020 Dutch Twenty20 Cup.

In March 2021, he earned his maiden call-up to the Netherlands national cricket team, for the 2020–21 Nepal Tri-Nation Series. He made his Twenty20 International (T20I) debut against Nepal during the inaugural match of the tri-nation series, in which he took a wicket. In May 2021, he was named in the Netherlands' squad for their home series against Scotland, although he is yet to make his One Day International (ODI) debut.
