= Zawar Farid =

Emirati cricketer (born 1992)

Personal information
- Born: 25 July 1992 (age 34); Sahiwal, Punjab, Pakistan
- Batting: Right-handed
- Bowling: Right-arm medium
- Role: Bowler

International information
- National side: United Arab Emirates
- ODI debut (cap 86): 5 January 2020 v Oman
- Last ODI: 11 August 2022 v USA
- T20I debut (cap 47): 6 August 2019 v Netherlands
- Last T20I: 19 February 2023 v Afghanistan
- Source: Cricinfo, 19 February 2023

Zawar Farid (born 25 July 1992) is a Pakistani-born cricketer who plays for the United Arab Emirates national cricket team. In July 2019, he was named in the United Arab Emirates (UAE) squad for their Twenty20 International (T20I) series against the Netherlands. He made his T20I debut for the UAE against the Netherlands on 6 August 2019. In September 2019, he was named in the United Arab Emirates' squad for the 2019 ICC T20 World Cup Qualifier tournament in the UAE. In December 2019, he was named in the One Day International (ODI) squad for the 2019 United Arab Emirates Tri-Nation Series. He made his ODI debut against Oman, on 5 January 2020. In December 2020, he was among the ten cricketers awarded a year-long full-time contract by the Emirates Cricket Board.
