= Alex O'Dowd =

New Zealand cricketer (born 1967)

Personal information
- Full name: Alexander Patrick O'Dowd
- Born: 25 February 1967 (age 59); Auckland, New Zealand
- Batting: Right-handed
- Role: Batsman
- Relatives: Max O'Dowd (son)

Domestic team information
- Years: Team
- 1991/92–1993/94: Auckland
- 1996/97–1997/98: Northern Districts
- FC debut: 3 January 1992 Auckland v Wellington
- Last FC: 17 March 1997 Northern Districts v Auckland

Career statistics
| Competition | First-class | List A |
|---|---|---|
| Matches | 17 | 13 |
| Runs scored | 604 | 108 |
| Batting average | 25.16 | 9.00 |
| 100s/50s | 1/2 | 0/0 |
| Top score | 113 | 29 |
| Catches/stumpings | 12/– | 7/– |
- Source: CricketArchive, 12 September 2008

Alexander Patrick O'Dowd (born 25 February 1967) is a New Zealand rugby union coach and former first-class cricketer. He has coached North Harbour Rugby Union Mitre 10 Cup side, was head coach of the Dutch national side and as of 2019 is assistant coach with Nottingham Rugby Club in the English Championship and.

A right-handed batsman, O'Dowd made 17 appearances in first-class cricket, 14 of them for Auckland between 1991 and the end of 1993 and three more for Northern Districts in 1996–97. O'Dowd scored his only century in his second match; hitting 113 against Canterbury in 1992. He also briefly served as Auckland's captain.

For several seasons from 1991 O'Dowd was a cricket player/coach in the Netherlands for Hoofdklasse club HBS Craeyenhout. O'Dowd's son, Max O'Dowd, also plays cricket, and, by virtue of holding a Dutch passport, made his debut for the Dutch national side in 2015.
