= Darius D'Silva =

Emirati cricketer

Personal information
- Full name: Darius Del Piero D'Silva
- Born: 16 April 1998 (age 28); Dubai, United Arab Emirates
- Batting: Right-handed
- Role: Bowler

International information
- National side: United Arab Emirates
- ODI debut (cap 81): 8 December 2019 v United States
- Last ODI: 9 January 2020 v Namibia
- T20I debut (cap 45): 3 August 2019 v Netherlands
- Last T20I: 30 October 2019 v Scotland
- Source: Cricinfo, 9 January 2020

Darius D'Silva (born 16 April 1998) is a cricketer who played for the United Arab Emirates national cricket team. He made his international debut for the United Arab Emirates in August 2019. He lives in Perth, Western Australia, and has represented the Western Australia cricket team at the under-19 level.

In July 2019, he was named in the United Arab Emirates squad for their Twenty20 International (T20I) series against the Netherlands. He made his T20I debut for the UAE against the Netherlands on 3 August 2019. In October 2019, he was added to the United Arab Emirates' squad for the 2019 ICC T20 World Cup Qualifier tournament in the UAE. In December 2019, he was named in the One Day International (ODI) squad for the 2019 United Arab Emirates Tri-Nation Series. He made his ODI debut against the United States on 8 December 2019.
