= Waheed Ahmed =

Emirati cricketer (born 1985)

Personal information
- Born: 15 November 1985 (age 40); Sahiwal, Pakistan
- Batting: Right-handed
- Bowling: Right-arm medium
- Role: Batsman

International information
- National side: United Arab Emirates
- ODI debut (cap 84): 8 December 2019 v United States
- Last ODI: 18 January 2021 v Ireland
- T20I debut (cap 46): 5 August 2019 v Netherlands
- Last T20I: 27 February 2020 v Kuwait
- Source: Cricinfo, 18 January 2021

Waheed Ahmed (born 15 November 1985) is a Pakistani-born cricketer who plays for the United Arab Emirates national cricket team. He made his Twenty20 debut for the United Arab Emirates against the England Lions on 4 December 2015.

In March 2019, he was named in the UAE Twenty20 International (T20I) squad for their series against the United States, but was not picked in the playing eleven. In July 2019, he was again named in the UAE T20I squad, this time for their series against the Netherlands. He made his T20I debut for the UAE against the Netherlands on 5 August 2019.

In October 2019, he was added to the United Arab Emirates' squad for the 2019 ICC T20 World Cup Qualifier tournament in the UAE. In December 2019, he was named in the One Day International (ODI) squad for the 2019 United Arab Emirates Tri-Nation Series. He made his ODI debut against the United States on 8 December 2019.

In December 2020, he was one of ten cricketers to be awarded with a year-long full-time contract by the Emirates Cricket Board.
