= Tom Cooper (cricketer) =

Australian-Dutch cricketer (born 1986)

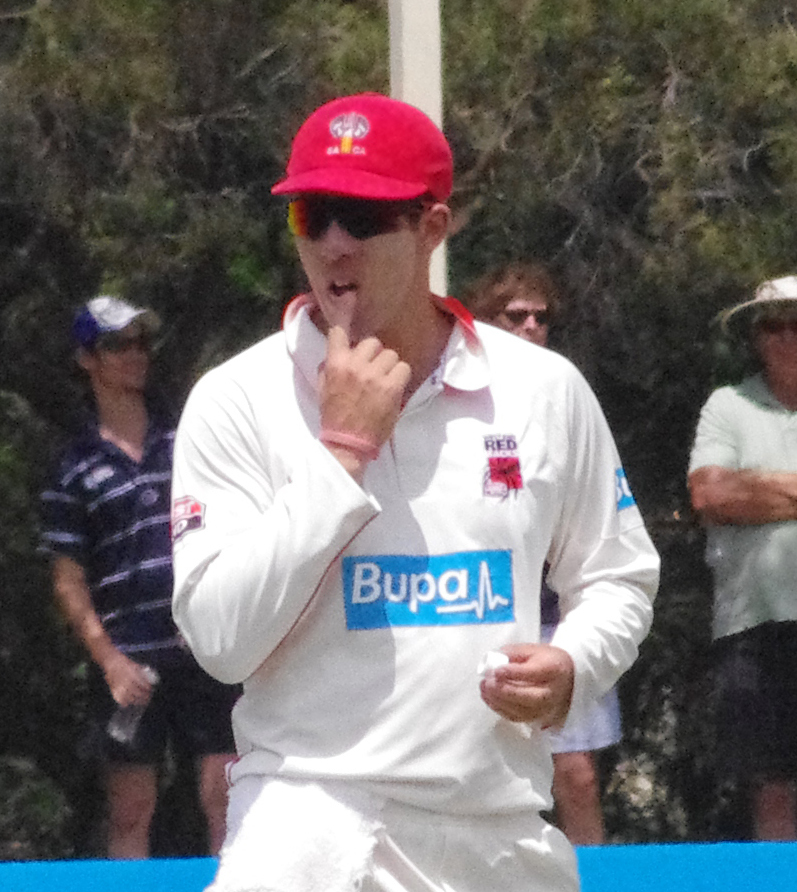
- Cooper with the South Australian cricket team in 2011.

Personal information
- Full name: Tom Lexley William Cooper
- Born: 26 November 1986 (age 39); Wollongong, New South Wales, Australia
- Nickname: Coops
- Batting: Right-handed
- Bowling: Right-arm off-break
- Role: Middle-order batsman
- Relatives: Ben Cooper (brother)

International information
- National side: Netherlands
- ODI debut (cap 44): 15 June 2010 v Scotland
- Last ODI: 2 April 2023 v South Africa
- ODI shirt no.: 26
- T20I debut (cap 21): 13 March 2012 v Canada
- Last T20I: 6 November 2022 v South Africa
- T20I shirt no.: 26

Domestic team information
- Years: Team
- 2008/09–2020/21: South Australia
- 2011/12: Adelaide Strikers
- 2012/13–2019/20: Melbourne Renegades
- 2015: Somerset
- 2018: St Kitts & Nevis Patriots
- 2020/21–2021/22: Brisbane Heat (squad no. 26)

Career statistics
| Competition | ODI | T20I | FC | LA |
|---|---|---|---|---|
| Matches | 32 | 33 | 109 | 169 |
| Runs scored | 1,319 | 659 | 6,533 | 5,848 |
| Batting average | 45.48 | 23.53 | 34.93 | 40.89 |
| 100s/50s | 1/12 | 0/3 | 13/34 | 10/38 |
| Top score | 101 | 81* | 271* | 139 |
| Balls bowled | 649 | 114 | 2,098 | 1,200 |
| Wickets | 14 | 3 | 25 | 26 |
| Bowling average | 36.85 | 48.33 | 50.64 | 40.69 |
| 5 wickets in innings | 0 | 0 | 1 | 0 |
| 10 wickets in match | 0 | 0 | 0 | 0 |
| Best bowling | 3/11 | 2/18 | 5/76 | 3/11 |
| Catches/stumpings | 17/– | 12/– | 117/– | 93/– |
- Source: ESPNcricinfo, 21 October 2024

Tom Lexley William Cooper (born 26 November 1986) is an Australian–Dutch former cricketer who represented the Netherlands in international cricket from 2010 to 2023. He also played for South Australia in Australian domestic cricket, as well as for the Adelaide Strikers, Melbourne Renegades, and Brisbane Heat in the Big Bash League.

Cooper played his junior cricket in New South Wales, but after his youth career he moved to Adelaide and played domestic cricket for South Australia. In 2009, Cooper discovered he was eligible to play for the Netherlands national cricket team due to his Dutch passport, and he later represented the country in international cricket for over a decade, playing in the 2011 Cricket World Cup and two Twenty20 World Cups in 2014 and 2016.

Cooper's life and career were greatly affected by the death of friend and teammate Phillip Hughes. Cooper was Hughes' batting partner when Hughes was struck by a cricket ball during a match on 25 November 2015, leading to his death two days later. Cooper's career faltered for some time after the tragedy.

Cooper's domestic cricket career in Australia ended after his final season with South Australia in 2020–21 and his final season in the Big Bash League in 2021–22. He then returned to the Dutch national team after a six-year hiatus and played in the 2022 Men's T20 World Cup in Australia. He played his final international match for the Netherlands in 2023.

== Early life and family ==
Cooper was born in Wollongong in regional New South Wales on 26 November 1986. His mother, Bernardine Cooper, was born in Indonesia while the territory was still under the control of the Netherlands as Dutch New Guinea. Later in life, this connection would make Cooper eligible for a Dutch passport, which provided opportunities to advance his cricket career in Europe.

Cooper's family moved to Lismore in 1990, where Cooper's younger brother Ben was born. Ben would later play international cricket for the Netherlands. Cooper began playing junior cricket there when he signed up to play under-12s cricket as a seven-year-old.

== Career ==
=== Early career ===
Cooper began playing junior cricket in Lismore when he signed up to play under-12s cricket as a seven-year-old. He made his way through junior pathways all the way up to representing Australia in the 2006 Under-19 Cricket World Cup. Cooper scored the first century of the World Cup in Australia's first match against South Africa, scoring 104 runs and being named the player of the match.

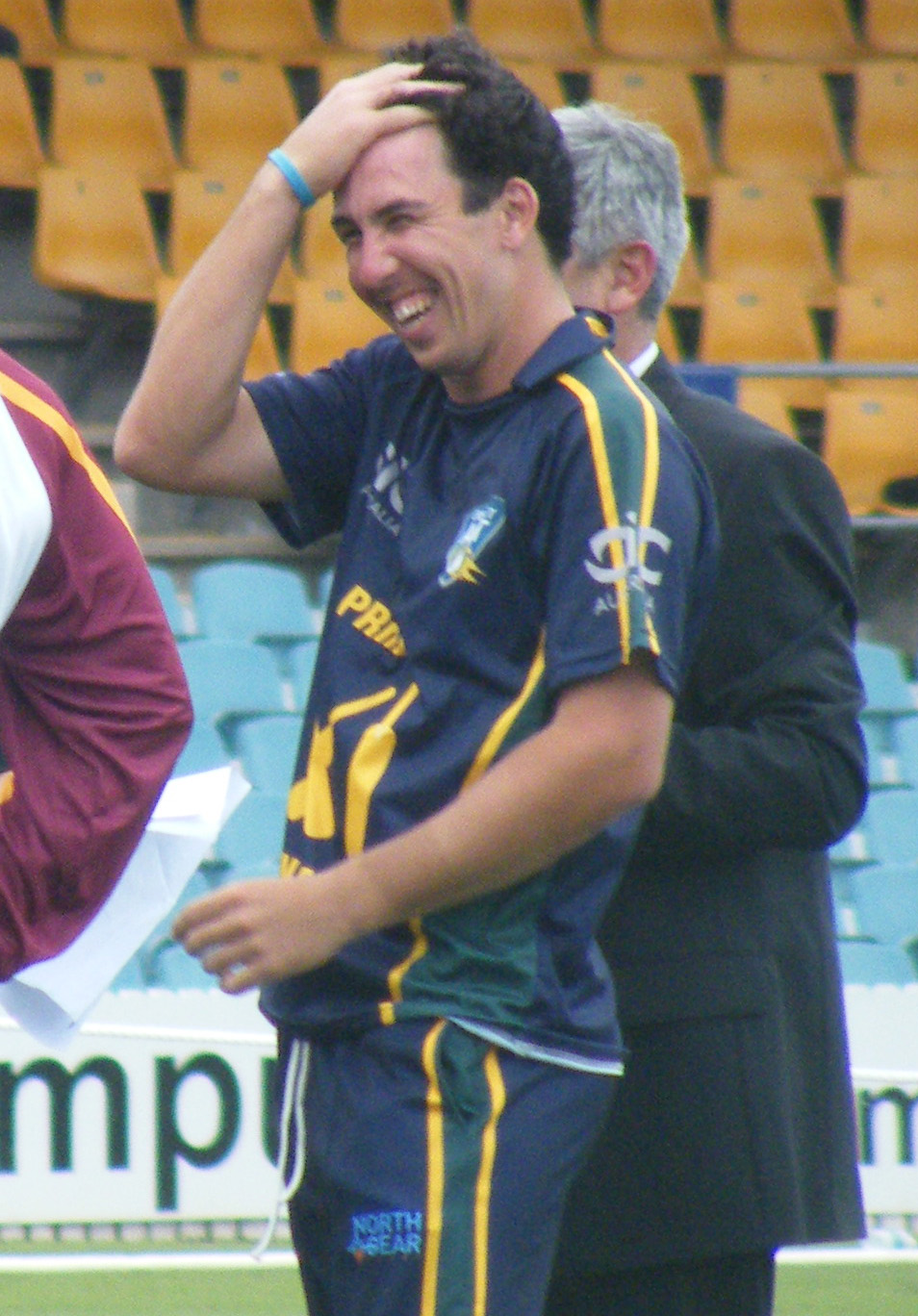
Tom Cooper playing for the Prime Minister's XI in 2010.

Cooper was unable to break into the New South Wales state team, and was instead signed for a state contract with South Australia ahead of the 2008–09 season. Cooper first played for South Australia in a Sheffield Shield match against Western Australia at Adelaide Oval in November 2008. He then made his one-day debut for South Australia against Western Australia in a Ford Ranger Cup match, also at Adelaide Oval, opening the innings and scoring 53 from 67 deliveries. During his first season, Cooper managed to score his maiden first-class century, as well as his maiden Twenty20 fifty in just the second Twenty20 of his career. In a one-day match against Victoria, Cooper was struck on the head by a delivery from Victorian fast bowler Shane Harwood. Despite wearing a helmet at the time, Cooper suffered a fractured skull and was immediately rushed to the hospital.

Cooper's form for South Australia meant he was selected to play for the Australian Institute of Sports in an Emerging Players Tournament over the 2009 winter. His breakout performance came near the end of the 2009–10 season when he played a tour match for the Prime Minister's XI against the West Indies cricket team. After Chris Gayle had scored 146 runs for the West Indies, Cooper outdid him with 160 not out from 120 balls, hitting six sixes and 14 fours.

=== Playing for Netherlands (2010–2016) ===
Cooper discovered that he qualified to play for the Netherlands national cricket team by accident. As a 21-year-old in 2008, he spent a winter playing for Forfarshire Cricket Club in Scotland. Using a Dutch passport to travel, he was eligible to play as a local player in pre-Brexit Scotland. Peter Drinnen, the Dutch coach at the time, had previously played for Forfarshire and discovered that Cooper was using a Dutch passport, so he asked if Cooper wished to play for the Netherlands. Before this outreach, Cooper didn't even know that the Netherlands had a cricket team.

The Koninklijke Nederlandse Cricket Bond, the governing body of cricket in the Netherlands, arranged for Cooper to play domestic cricket in the Netherlands in 2010 before he joined their national team due to controversy surrounding players from full members of the ICC, such as Australia, playing for other countries. After playing for the Netherlands during their 2010 Clydesdale Bank 40 campaign, he made his One Day International debut for the Netherlands in a match against Scotland, in which he scored an unbeaten 80 to help his side to a six-wicket victory at the Hazelaarweg Stadion in Rotterdam. He was named the man of the match for his performance.

Cooper became the first cricketer to score half-centuries in each of his first three One Day Internationals after he followed up his first innings with 87 against Scotland in his next match and then 67 against Kenya in his third at the start of the 2010 ICC World Cricket League Division One competition. At the end of tournament he continued his string of good form with his maiden century and a score of 96 in two matches against Afghanistan. Cooper was included in the Netherlands' 15-man squad for the 2011 Cricket World Cup. The team lost all six of their matches and were knocked out in the group stage.

Cooper's domestic cricket duties in Australia meant that he was not always available to play international cricket for the Netherlands. When he became available for the 2014 ICC World Twenty20, he was again selected to play for the Netherlands as an injury replacement for Tim Gruijters. Gruijters claimed that his back injury was a recurring problem which the team had known about previously, that he was fit to play, and that the only reason he'd been omitted from the team was because Cooper had become available. The ICC said that the correct process of obtaining independent medical advice had been followed, so Cooper was allowed to play in the tournament. Cooper was the second-highest run-scorer of the entire tournament, playing seven matches and scoring 231 runs at an average of 57.75 and a strike-rate of 137.50. Cooper was next selected to play for the Netherlands in the 2016 World Twenty20, but this would be his last appearance for the Netherlands for several years as his domestic career in Australia took priority.

=== Continued career in Australia (2010–2014) ===
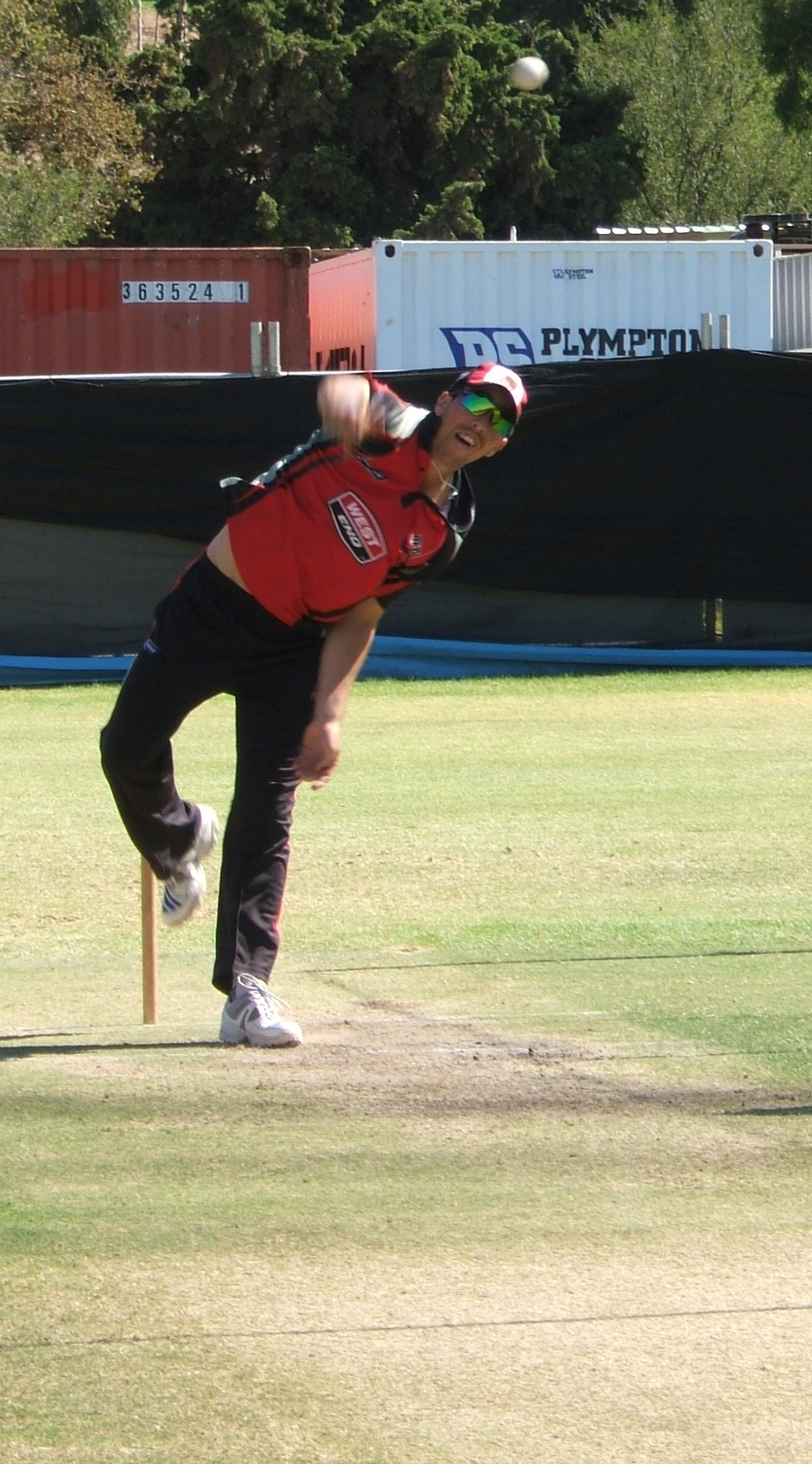
Tom Cooper bowling for South Australia in 2010.

While playing for the Netherlands in international cricket, Cooper continued to play domestic cricket in Australia for South Australia, as well as Twenty20 cricket for the Adelaide Strikers, the Melbourne Renegades, and the Brisbane Heat in the newly-formed Big Bash League. He also represented Australia A, joining the team for a tour of England in July 2012, and then again for a quadrangular series in 2014.

Cooper had a standout season with South Australia in the 2013–14 season, one of few Redbacks successful with the bat in the 2013–14 Ryobi One-Day Cup with 294 runs, the second most in the team. He was recognised by the club as the most outstanding Redback of the season.

=== Later career (2014–2021) ===
Cooper was at the non-strikers end on 25 November 2014 when Phillip Hughes, then both his teammate and his roommate, was struck by a cricket ball in his neck. Hughes died in hospital two days later and Cooper was one of three cricketers to be pallbearers at Hughes' funeral. Cooper was greatly impacted by this event, and he responded by throwing himself more into cricket, which he later described as a mistake. In February 2015, he signed to play for Somerset County Cricket Club for the whole of the 2015 English county season (signing as a non-overseas player due to his Dutch passport). He had some success with Somerset, scoring two centuries for the club with the bat and taking the only five-wicket haul of his first-class career with the ball, but overall his form declined in the eighteen months after Hughes' death. In the 2015–16 Sheffield Shield season, Hughes had a batting average of just 17.78 before he was dropped from the South Australian team for their last three games. His contract with the team was not renewed at the end of the season.

Cooper returned to form immediately at the start of the 2016–17 season. He impressed enough in grade cricket to earn his place back in the state team, and he scored 138 runs in the opening match of the Sheffield Shield season. South Australia's coach Jamie Siddons credited his comeback with having had the time to work through his grief after Hughes' death. He top-scored for South Australia across the Sheffield Shield season with 736 runs, and midway through the season he'd played enough matches to get upgraded back to a contract with the team. Cooper's form, along with a successful Shield season for the Redbacks, meant at the end of the season he was able to play in the first Sheffield Shield final of his career. After the season he was given a new contract with South Australia for the 2017–18 season.

Cooper achieved his highest first-class score of 271 not out on 13 October 2019 on the final day of a farcical match against Victoria. Across the four days of the match, 1,287 runs were scored but only 12 wickets taken by bowlers. Once it had become clear that the match would not have a result, Victoria rested their pace bowlers and relied on spin bowlers and part-time bowlers for the last three sessions of the match, making batting much easier. Cooper's score was the highest a South Australian batter since Darren Lehmann scored 301 in the 2005–06 Sheffield Shield season.

In April 2021, Cooper was one of five players to be dropped by the South Australia cricket team, following a season without any wins.

=== Return to the Netherlands (2022–2023) ===
In 2022, Cooper discovered an e-mail in his junk folder from Roland Lefebvre, the Netherlands national team's high performance manager, asking if he'd consider returning to the Dutch team. Several experienced players had recently retired, including Cooper's own brother Ben, and the team was seeking experienced batsmen for the middle order. With no more domestic cricket commitments in Australia, Cooper made the move to the Netherlands for the 2022 summer with the goal of playing in the 2022 Men's T20 World Cup back home in Australia.

Cooper's first match after his return came a series of One Day International matches against England. When Cooper played in the first match of the series, it was his first match for the Netherlands since the 2016 World Twenty20, and his first ODI since July 2013, a gap of almost nine years. He had a successful return, helping the Netherlands to qualify for the World Cup in the global qualifiers and scoring three consecutive half-centuries in an ODI series against Pakistan. He went on to play in the 2022 Men's T20 World Cup in Australia, and played his final ODI for the Netherlands against South Africa on 2 April 2023.

== See also ==
- List of South Australian representative cricketers
