= Ahsan Malik (cricketer) =

Dutch cricketer (born 1989)

Personal information
- Full name: Malik Ahsan Ahmad Jamil
- Born: 29 August 1989 (age 37); Rotterdam, Netherlands
- Batting: Right-handed
- Bowling: Right-arm medium-fast
- Role: Bowler

International information
- National side: Netherlands (2011–2017)
- ODI debut (cap 52): 29 July 2011 v Scotland
- Last ODI: 28 January 2014 v Canada
- ODI shirt no.: 17
- T20I debut (cap 22): 13 March 2012 v Canada
- Last T20I: 18 January 2017 v Hong Kong
- T20I shirt no.: 17

Career statistics
Competition	ODI	T20I	FC	LA
Matches	12	31	4	47
Runs scored	14	28	36	71
Batting average	–	9.33	18.00	10.14
100s/50s	0/0	0/0	0/0	0/0
Top score	10*	11*	21	12
Balls bowled	471	575	563	1,806
Wickets	12	44	8	60
Bowling average	34.00	16.59	28.87	24.38
5 wickets in innings	0	1	0	1
10 wickets in match	0	0	0	0
Best bowling	3/38	5/19	3/55	5/7
Catches/stumpings	4/–	13/–	1/–	20/–
- Source: Cricinfo, 8 June 2022

Malik Ahsan Ahmad Jamil (born 29 August 1989) is a Dutch cricketer. He is originally from Gujrat, Punjab, now in Pakistan. He played for the Netherlands in the 2014 ICC World Twenty20 tournament.

He was the leading wicket-taker along with Imran Tahir in the 2014 ICC World Twenty20

== Career ==
Malik made his first-class cricket debut against Scotland on 21 June 2011. He also played for the Netherlands national cricket team in One Day Internationals (ODIs) and Twenty20 Internationals (T20Is). His Twenty20 International best bowling figures of 5/19 was against South Africa in ICC World Twenty20 2014. He was also the joint top wicket taker in the tournament. He took eleven wickets against Nepal in four T20I matches in July 2015, and was the joint player of the series with Nepal's Paras Khadka. Malik's figures of 5/19 in a T20I are the best by a bowler in a losing cause and are the best figures in a T20 World Cup match in a losing cause.

During the 2015 ICC World Twenty20 Qualifier Malik was reported for bowling with an illegal action following the Netherlands win over Scotland on 11 July. He was not allowed to take any further part in the tournament, until an independent assessment has taken place. Following rehabilitative training, Malik's action was cleared by the ICC six months later, and he returned to international cricket against the UAE in the Intercontinental Cup in January 2016.
