= Antonius Staal =

Dutch cricketer

Personal information
- Full name: Antonius J Staal
- Born: 30 March 1996 (age 30); The Hague, Netherlands
- Batting: Right-handed
- Bowling: Leg-break googly
- Role: Batsman

International information
- National side: Netherlands
- T20I debut (cap 45): 3 August 2019 v UAE
- Last T20I: 24 April 2021 v Nepal

Career statistics
Competition	T20I	LA	T20
Matches	14	2	15
Runs scored	127	17	127
Batting average	15.87	8.50	14.11
100s/50s	0/0	0/0	0/0
Top score	28*	13	28*
Catches/stumpings	0/–	0/–	0/–
- Source: Cricinfo, 25 May 2022

Antonius J Staal (born 30 March 1996) is a Dutch cricketer. He made his Twenty20 debut for the Netherlands in the 2018 MCC Tri-Nation Series against the Marylebone Cricket Club on 29 July 2018.

In July 2019, he was selected to play for the Amsterdam Knights in the inaugural edition of the Euro T20 Slam cricket tournament. Later the same month, he was named in the Dutch squad for the Twenty20 International (T20I) series against the United Arab Emirates. He made his T20I debut for the Netherlands against the United Arab Emirates on 3 August 2019.

He was part of the Dutch squad for the 2019 ICC T20 World Cup Qualifier tournament in the United Arab Emirates. In April 2020, he was one of seventeen Dutch-based cricketers to be named in the team's senior squad. He made his List A debut on 11 May 2021, for the Netherlands A team against the Ireland Wolves, during their tour of Ireland. Later the same month, he was named in the Dutch One Day International (ODI) squad for their series against Scotland.

In May 2022, he was named in the Dutch ODI squad for their series against the West Indies.
