= Sebastiaan Braat =

Dutch cricketer

Personal information
- Full name: Thomas Sebastiaan Braat
- Born: 14 November 1992 (age 33); Vlaardingen, Netherlands
- Batting: Right-handed
- Bowling: Right-arm medium-fast
- Role: Bowler
- Relatives: Marloes Braat (sister)

International information
- National side: Netherlands
- T20I debut (cap 47): 5 August 2019 v UAE
- Last T20I: 24 April 2021 v Nepal

Career statistics
| Competition | T20I | FC | T20 |
|---|---|---|---|
| Matches | 6 | 2 | 6 |
| Runs scored | 32 | 28 | 32 |
| Batting average | 16.00 | 14.00 | 16.00 |
| 100s/50s | 0/0 | 0/0 | 0/0 |
| Top score | 26* | 23 | 26* |
| Balls bowled | 108 | 162 | 108 |
| Wickets | 9 | 0 | 9 |
| Bowling average | 18.00 | – | 18.00 |
| 5 wickets in innings | 0 | – | 0 |
| 10 wickets in match | 0 | – | 0 |
| Best bowling | 3/26 | – | 3/26 |
| Catches/stumpings | 1/– | 0/– | 1/– |
- Source: Cricinfo, 27 May 2021

Thomas Sebastiaan Braat (born 14 November 1992) is a Dutch international cricketer who made his debut for the Dutch national side in July 2012. He is a right-arm pace bowler.

The younger brother of Marloes Braat, who played for the Dutch women's team, Braat was born in Vlaardingen, South Holland. He represented the Dutch under-19s at the 2009 and 2010 editions of the ICC Europe Under-19 Championships, and also at the 2009 Under-19 World Cup Qualifier. Braat made his senior debut for the Netherlands in July 2012, in an Intercontinental Cup fixture against the United Arab Emirates (which held first-class status). He played a second Intercontinental Cup game the following year, against Ireland.

In July 2019, he was named in the Dutch squad for the Twenty20 International (T20I) series against the United Arab Emirates. He made his T20I debut against the United Arab Emirates on 5 August 2019. In April 2020, he was one of seventeen Dutch-based cricketers to be named in the team's senior squad.
