= Aryan Dutt =

Dutch cricketer (born 2003)

Personal information
- Full name: Aryan Dutt
- Born: 12 May 2003 (age 23); The Hague, Netherlands
- Height: 1.94 m (6 ft 4 in)
- Batting: Right-handed
- Bowling: Right-arm off-break
- Role: Bowler

International information
- National side: Netherlands (2021–present)
- ODI debut (cap 71): 19 May 2021 v Scotland
- Last ODI: 31 July 2026 v Namibia
- ODI shirt no.: 88
- T20I debut (cap 52): 17 April 2021 v Nepal
- Last T20I: 18 February 2026 v India
- T20I shirt no.: 88

Domestic team information
- Years: Team
- 2026: Amsterdam Flames

Career statistics
Competition	ODI	T20I	LA	T20
Matches	60	30	62	39
Runs scored	233	136	247	152
Batting average	7.06	13.60	7.26	13.81
100s/50s	0/0	0/0	0/0	0/0
Top score	23*	30	23*	30
Balls bowled	2,885	584	2,903	758
Wickets	74	30	77	37
Bowling average	30.39	22.50	29.45	23.05
5 wickets in innings	1	0	1	0
10 wickets in match	0	0	0	0
Best bowling	6/34	3/17	6/34	3/17
Catches/stumpings	15/–	3/–	16/–	4/–
- Source: Cricinfo, 25 September 2026

Aryan Dutt (born 12 May 2003) is a Dutch cricketer who plays for the Netherlands national cricket team as a right-arm off spin bowler. In March 2021, he was named in the Netherlands Twenty20 International (T20I) squad for the 2020–21 Nepal Tri-Nation Series. The Dutch coach, Ryan Campbell, described Dutt as an exciting prospect. He made his T20I debut against Nepal, on 17 April 2021. Prior to his call-up to the national side, Dutt had also played at the under-18 and under-19 level for the Netherlands.

== Early life ==
Dutt was born on 12 May 2003 in The Hague, and grew up in The Hague. His father is from Punjab, India, and his parents moved to the Netherlands in the 1980s. His cricketing journey was influenced by India's 2011 Cricket World Cup win. He began his cricket training in the Netherlands and, later, at age 13, in Chandigarh, India.

Dutt plays Topklasse cricket for Voorburg Cricket Club.

== Career ==
Dutt represented the Netherlands national under-19 cricket team at the 2021 ICC U19 World Cup Europe Qualifier in Spain, taking five wickets in three matches.

In May 2021, Dutt was named in the Netherlands A squad for their series against the Ireland Wolves. He made his List A debut on 12 May 2021, for the Netherlands A team against the Ireland Wolves, during their tour of Ireland. Later the same month, he was named in the Dutch One Day International (ODI) squad for their series against Scotland. He made his ODI debut on 19 May 2021, for the Netherlands against Scotland. In June 2022, during the ODI series against the West Indies, Dutt took the wicket of captain Nicholas Pooran in all three matches, preventing him from scoring above 10 runs each game.

At the 2023 Cricket World Cup, Dutt scored 23 not out from nine balls in the Netherlands' victory against South Africa. He scored three sixes, equalling the record of Daren Powell for the most sixes in a World Cup innings by a number-ten batsman.

In May 2024, he was named in the Netherlands squad for the 2024 ICC Men's T20 World Cup tournament.
