= Jeroen Smits =

Dutch cricketer (born 1972)

Personal information
- Born: 21 June 1972 (age 54); The Hague, Netherlands
- Batting: Right-handed
- Role: Wicket-keeper

International information
- National side: Netherlands (2003–2009)
- ODI debut (cap 23): 12 February 2003 v India
- Last ODI: 1 September 2009 v Afghanistan
- ODI shirt no.: 10
- T20I debut (cap 8): 2 August 2008 v Kenya
- Last T20I: 9 June 2009 v Pakistan
- T20I shirt no.: 10

Domestic team information
- Years: Team
- HCC

Career statistics
Competition	ODI	T20I	FC	LA
Matches	38	6	11	68
Runs scored	169	15	132	256
Batting average	16.90	15.00	12.00	12.80
100s/50s	0/0	0/0	0/0	0/0
Top score	29*	11*	26	29*
Catches/stumpings	41/7	1/0	28/5	81/14
- Source: Cricinfo, 12 May 2017

Jeroen Smits (born 21 June 1972) is a Dutch former cricketer and a former captain of the national side. He played as a right-handed batsman and usually also as a wicketkeeper.

For many years, since his debut in cricket's ICC Trophy on 20 February 1994, Smits had been the backup keeper to Reinout Scholte and was called upon whenever needed. Since 2002, he has involved himself in Dutch league games. He captained his country in a game against Scotland in the 2007 World Cup, and in the 2009 ICC World Twenty20 captained his side to a win over hosts England, to date their most significant cricketing victory by some margin.

In October 2009, he announced his retirement from international cricket. In April 2018, he was appointed the team manager of the national team.
