= Alasdair Evans =

Scottish cricketer (born 1989)

Personal information
- Full name: Alasdair Campbell Evans
- Born: 12 January 1989 (age 37); Pembury, Kent, England
- Batting: Right-handed
- Bowling: Right-arm fast-medium
- Role: Bowler

International information
- National side: Scotland (2009–2023)
- ODI debut (cap 38): 7 July 2009 v Canada
- Last ODI: 27 June 2023 v Sri Lanka
- ODI shirt no.: 45
- T20I debut (cap 38): 18 June 2015 v Ireland
- Last T20I: 29 July 2022 v New Zealand
- T20I shirt no.: 45

Domestic team information
- Years: Team
- 2009: Loughborough UCCE
- 2012–2013: Derbyshire

Career statistics
| Competition | ODI | T20I | FC | LA |
|---|---|---|---|---|
| Matches | 42 | 35 | 13 | 69 |
| Runs scored | 100 | 10 | 47 | 138 |
| Batting average | 9.09 | 1.25 | 7.83 | 8.62 |
| 100s/50s | 0/0 | 0/0 | 0/0 | 0/0 |
| Top score | 28 | 8 | 14* | 28 |
| Balls bowled | 1,928 | 720 | 1,485 | 2,967 |
| Wickets | 58 | 41 | 26 | 85 |
| Bowling average | 28.94 | 23.26 | 38.53 | 30.08 |
| 5 wickets in innings | 1 | 1 | 1 | 1 |
| 10 wickets in match | 0 | 0 | 0 | 0 |
| Best bowling | 5/43 | 5/24 | 6/30 | 5/43 |
| Catches/stumpings | 9/– | 11/– | 3/– | 15/– |
- Source: ESPNcricinfo, 19 February 2024

Alasdair Campbell Evans (born 12 January 1989) is an English-born Scottish cricketer. Evans is a right-handed batsman who bowls right-arm medium-fast. He was born in Pembury, Kent.

== Domestic and T20 career ==
While studying for his degree at Loughborough University, Evans made his first-class debut for Loughborough UCCE against Leicestershire in 2009. He made a further appearance for the team in 2009, against Kent. In that season he made his One Day International debut for Scotland, playing two matches against Canada, in the process claiming his first international wicket, that of Sunil Dhaniram.

Later in August 2009, Evans made his first first-class appearance for Scotland against Ireland in the 2009-10 ICC Intercontinental Cup. In 2010, he played a List A match for Scotland against India A, which Scotland lost by 152 runs. In 2011, he made his most recent first-class appearance for Scotland, against the Netherlands in the 2011-13 ICC Intercontinental Cup.

In July 2019, he was selected to play for the Glasgow Giants in the inaugural edition of the Euro T20 Slam cricket tournament. However, the following month the tournament was cancelled.

== International career ==
He made his Twenty20 International debut against Ireland on 18 June 2015. In December 2017, he finished as the joint-leading wicket-taker in the 2015–17 ICC World Cricket League Championship, with 24 wickets in 12 matches.

In September 2019, he was named in Scotland's squad for the 2019 ICC T20 World Cup Qualifier tournament in the United Arab Emirates. In May 2021, during the series against the Netherlands, Evans took his first five-wicket haul in an ODI match. In September 2021, Evans was named in Scotland's provisional squad for the 2021 ICC Men's T20 World Cup.
