= Michael Swart =

Australian cricketer (born 1982)

Personal information
- Full name: Michael Richard Swart
- Born: 1 October 1982 (age 44); Subiaco, Western Australia
- Batting: Right handed
- Bowling: Right arm Offbreak
- Role: Batting all-rounder

International information
- National side: Netherlands
- ODI debut (cap 51): 28 June 2011 v Scotland
- Last ODI: 28 January 2014 v Canada
- T20I debut (cap 24): 13 March 2012 v Canada
- Last T20I: 5 February 2016 v Scotland
- T20I shirt no.: 25

Domestic team information
- Years: Team
- 2009/10–2010/11: Western Australia

Career statistics
Competition	ODI	T20I	FC	LA
Matches	12	26	14	55
Runs scored	197	621	664	1,071
Batting average	19.70	27.00	26.56	21.00
100s/50s	0/1	0/3	1/4	1/6
Top score	52	89	104	102
Balls bowled	366	318	216	1,559
Wickets	3	14	5	30
Bowling average	102.00	25.07	29.80	45.50
5 wickets in innings	0	0	0	0
10 wickets in match	0	0	0	0
Best bowling	1/21	2/8	1/0	4/40
Catches/stumpings	5/–	7/–	5/–	20/–
- Source: CricketArchive, 14 February 2019

Michael Richard Swart (born 1 October 1982) is an Australian former professional cricketer who played international cricket for the Netherlands national cricket team between 2011 and 2016. He was born in Australia and also played for Western Australia in Australian domestic cricket.

== Domestic career ==
From Perth, Swart was a member of the WA state under-19 teams in 2000 and 2001 that were captained by Brett Jones and Shaun Marsh, respectively. However, he did not make his senior debut for the Warriors until January 2010, despite years of scoring heavily for his grade-cricket side Joondalup. While he made a duck in his first List A game, a few weeks later he made an impressive 83 in his debut Sheffield Shield match against Tasmania. In May 2010, he was awarded a contract with the Warriors for the 2010–11 season. He scored his maiden century in October 2010 against Victoria at the WACA Ground.

In February 2011, Swart was dropped from the Warriors squad after being charged with assaulting an opponent, Billy Godleman, in a grade cricket match between Joondalup and Bayswater-Morley. He was later found guilty by the WACA tribunal and suspended for three matches, with the tribunal rejecting his defence that he was only acting in self-defence. The following week the conviction and suspension was overturned upon appeal.

Swart's contract with the Warriors was not renewed for the 2011/2012 season, with him instead signing with Bootle Cricket Club in England.

== International career ==
In February 2011, it was reported that Swart was to be called up to represent the Netherlands at the 2011 Cricket World Cup following an injury to the team's captain Peter Borren. His father was born in the Netherlands, enabling Swart to hold a Dutch passport and be eligible to represent the country. He had previously rejected an offer to join the team at the Twenty20 World Cup, preferring to concentrate on maintaining his position in the Western Warriors team. However, in the following days it appeared that he was unlikely to play at the World Cup, with both Borren's injury being less severe than first thought and a Dutch selector denying that Swart had been approached.

Although he missed the World Cup, Swart went on to play 12 One Day Internationals and 26 Twenty20 Internationals for the Netherlands between 2011 and 2016, including the 2014 ICC World Twenty20. He was the team vice-captain and even captained in two games when Peter Borren was unavailable. He was dumped from the national squad at the end of a tour in the UAE in 2016 and told his services were no longer required.
