= Vikramjit Singh =

Dutch cricketer (born 2003)

Personal information
- Full name: Vikramjit Singh
- Born: 9 January 2003 (age 23); Cheema Khurd, Punjab, India
- Batting: Left-handed
- Bowling: Right-arm medium-fast
- Role: Batsman

International information
- National side: Netherlands (2019–present)
- ODI debut (cap 79): 20 June 2022 v New Zealand
- Last ODI: 31 July 2026 v Namibia
- ODI shirt no.: 7
- T20I debut (cap 49): 19 September 2019 v Ireland
- Last T20I: 3 September 2025 v Bangladesh
- T20I shirt no.: 7

Career statistics
Competition	ODI	T20I	LA	T20
Matches	47	29	49	35
Runs scored	1,304	400	1,305	490
Batting average	28.97	14.81	27.76	14.84
100s/50s	1/8	0/1	1/8	0/1
Top score	110	52	110	52
Balls bowled	246	99	276	159
Wickets	7	6	8	7
Bowling average	36.71	27.16	34.50	35.28
5 wickets in innings	0	0	0	0
10 wickets in match	0	0	0	0
Best bowling	2/12	3/16	2/12	3/16
Catches/stumpings	8/–	11/–	11/–	13/–
- Source: Cricinfo, 27 September 2026

Vikramjit Singh (born 9 January 2003) is an Indian-born Dutch cricketer. He made his debut for the Netherlands national cricket team in 2019 as a left-handed opening batsman.

== Personal life ==
Singh was born on 9 January 2003 in Cheema Khurd, Punjab, India to a Sikh family. His grandfather Khushi Cheema fled to the Netherlands following the 1984 anti-Sikh riots in India and initially worked as a taxi driver before establishing a transport company in Amstelveen. The family moved back and forth between the Netherlands and India over the following decades, before settling permanently in the Netherlands when Singh was seven.

== Junior career ==
Singh was spotted at the age of eleven by Netherlands captain Peter Borren, who convinced him to play club cricket for VRA Amsterdam. He received private coaching from Borren and Amit Uniyal, attending Uniyal's academy in Chandigarh for several years. He made his debut for Netherlands A at the age of 15.

Singh represented the Netherlands national under-19 cricket team at the 2019 Under-19 World Cup Europe Qualifier. He finished as the second-highest run-scorer at the tournament behind Scotland's Tomas Mackintosh, recording 304 runs from five innings including 133 against France.

== Senior career ==
Singh was named in the Netherlands' Twenty20 International (T20I) squad for the 2019–20 Ireland Tri-Nation Series. He made his T20I debut for the Netherlands, against Scotland, on 19 September 2019. In April 2020, he was one of seventeen Dutch-based cricketers to be named in the team's senior squad.

He made his List A debut on 11 May 2021, for the Netherlands A team against the Ireland Wolves, during their tour of Ireland. Later the same month, he was named in the Dutch One Day International (ODI) squad for their series against Scotland. In February 2022, he was named in the Dutch ODI squad for their series against New Zealand. He made his ODI debut on 29 March 2022, for the Netherlands against New Zealand.

In July 2023, Singh beat his previous ODI personal best of 88 runs by scoring 110 against Oman to help the team win by 74 runs for the 2023 Cricket World Cup Qualifier in Harare, Zimbabwe. Subsequently, in the following game, the Netherlands beat Scotland to earn themselves a place in the 2023 Cricket World Cup.

In May 2024, he was named in the Netherlands squad for the 2024 ICC Men's T20 World Cup tournament.
