= Max O'Dowd =

Dutch cricketer (born 1994)

Personal information
- Full name: Maxwell Patrick O'Dowd
- Born: 4 March 1994 (age 32); Auckland, New Zealand
- Batting: Right-handed
- Bowling: Right-arm off spin
- Role: Batsman
- Relatives: Alex O'Dowd (father)

International information
- National side: Netherlands (2015–present)
- ODI debut (cap 66): 19 June 2019 v Zimbabwe
- Last ODI: 31 July 2026 v Namibia
- ODI shirt no.: 4
- T20I debut (cap 31): 1 July 2015 v Nepal
- Last T20I: 18 February 2026 v India
- T20I shirt no.: 4

Domestic team information
- Years: Team
- 2022/23: Auckland
- 2023: Chattogram Challengers
- 2026: Amsterdam Flames

Career statistics
Competition	ODI	T20I	FC	LA
Matches	72	91	5	86
Runs scored	2,300	2,354	326	2,540
Batting average	34.32	29.06	40.75	32.56
100s/50s	1/16	1/16	2/0	1/17
Top score	158*	133*	126	158*
Balls bowled	129	106	444	291
Wickets	1	4	6	4
Bowling average	149.00	38.50	53.50	74.50
5 wickets in innings	0	0	0	0
10 wickets in match	0	0	0	0
Best bowling	1/16	1/7	2/26	1/16
Catches/stumpings	19/–	35/–	1/–	29/–
- Source: Cricinfo, 31 July 2026

Maxwell Patrick O'Dowd (born 4 March 1994) is a New Zealand-born Dutch international cricketer who made his debut for the Netherlands national cricket team in June 2015. He is a right-handed opening batsman and has played for the Netherlands in three editions of the ICC Men's T20 World Cup.

== Personal life ==
O'Dowd was born on 4 March 1994 in Auckland, New Zealand. His father Alex O'Dowd played first-class cricket in New Zealand for Auckland and Northern Districts, and played and coached club cricket in the Netherlands for HBS Craeyenhout.

O'Dowd holds a Dutch passport through his mother. He lived in the Netherlands until the age of twelve, before returning to Auckland and attending Westlake Boys High School.

== Domestic and franchise career ==
O'Dowd played for the Netherlands national under-19 cricket team in the month-long 2012 European Challenge Series. His tournament included a five-wicket haul (5/20) against Jersey, and two half-centuries (against Jersey and Guernsey).

Back in New Zealand for the 2012–13 season, O'Dowd played every match for the Auckland under-19s in the National Under-19 Tournament. He played club cricket in England in 2013, and also appeared in a single match in the Second Eleven Championship in the same season, playing for Nottinghamshire. O'Dowd played regularly for Auckland A during the 2014–15 New Zealand season. For the 2015 season, he signed for the Northern Hurricanes franchise in the North Sea Pro Series, a professional league which features teams from the Netherlands and Scotland.

In July 2019, he was selected to play for the Rotterdam Rhinos in the inaugural edition of the Euro T20 Slam cricket tournament. However, the following month the tournament was cancelled.

== International career ==
In June 2015, O'Dowd made his senior debut for the Netherlands in an Intercontinental Cup match against Papua New Guinea. He scored 14 runs in the first innings before being dismissed by Loa Nou, and in the second innings was out to Willie Gavera for a five-ball duck. Brought on to bowl in Papua New Guinea's second innings, he took the wicket of Lega Siaka with his fourth ball in first-class cricket, finishing with 1/44. O'Dowd had not been named in the initial squad for that match.

O'Dowd made his Twenty20 International debut for the Netherlands against Nepal on 1 July 2015. He was named in the Dutch squads for both the WCL Championship fixture against PNG and the 2015 World Twenty20 Qualifier. He made his List A debut in the WCL Championship against Scotland on 14 September 2015.

In July 2018, he was named in the Netherlands One Day International (ODI) squad, for their series against Nepal, but did not make it to the playing eleven. In June 2019, he was named in the Netherlands' ODI squad for their series against Zimbabwe. He made his ODI debut against Zimbabwe on 19 June 2019.

In September 2019, he was named in the Dutch squad for the 2019 ICC T20 World Cup Qualifier tournament in the United Arab Emirates. In April 2020, he was one of seventeen Dutch-based cricketers to be named in the team's senior squad.

In March 2021, O'Dowd was named in the Dutch squad for the 2020–21 Nepal Tri-Nation Series. In the second match of the tournament, against Malaysia, O'Dowd scored 133 not out from 73 balls, and became the first batsman for the Netherlands to score a century in a T20I match. In May 2021, during the first ODI between Netherlands and Scotland, he became the second batsman to score half-centuries in each of his first three ODI matches after Tom Cooper.

In September 2021, O'Dowd was named in the Dutch squad for the 2021 ICC Men's T20 World Cup.

During the West Indies tour of the Netherlands in 2022, O’Dowd was the top scorer, with 179 runs across three matches, including 89 in the final game.

In September 2023, he was named in the Netherlands squad for the 2023 ICC Men's ODI World Cup.

In May 2024, he was named in the Netherlands squad for the 2024 ICC Men's T20 World Cup tournament.

On 12 June 2025, O'Dowd set a new record for the highest individual score by a Netherlands batter in an ODI, making 158 not out against Scotland at Forthill.
