= Vivian Kingma =

Dutch cricketer (born 1994)

Personal information
- Full name: Vivian Jilling Kingma
- Born: 23 October 1994 (age 32); The Hague, Netherlands
- Batting: Right-handed
- Bowling: Right-arm Medium fast
- Role: Bowler

International information
- National side: Netherlands (2014-present)
- ODI debut (cap 60): 28 January 2014 v Canada
- Last ODI: 12 June 2025 v Scotland
- T20I debut (cap 37): 5 February 2016 v Scotland
- Last T20I: 18 June 2025 v Scotland

Career statistics
Competition	ODI	T20I	FC	LA
Matches	30	26	6	56
Runs scored	16	10	10	49
Batting average	1.60	2.50	2.00	3.26
100s/50s	0/0	0/0	0/0	0/0
Top score	9*	4	5*	26
Balls bowled	1,364	524	951	2,354
Wickets	40	24	24	71
Bowling average	28.85	28.41	22.29	27.29
5 wickets in innings	0	0	0	1
10 wickets in match	0	0	0	0
Best bowling	3/19	4/21	4/36	6/39
Catches/stumpings	6/–	2/–	1/–	10/–
- Source: Cricinfo, 21 February 2026

Vivian Jilling Kingma (born 23 October 1994) is a Dutch cricketer. He played for the Netherlands in the 2014 ICC World Twenty20 tournament. He was initially selected in the Netherlands squad for the 2015 ICC World Twenty20 Qualifier tournament in July 2015, but was replaced by Roelof van der Merwe. He made his Twenty20 International debut against Scotland on 5 February 2016.

In December 2017, he took a hat-trick and his first five-wicket haul in List A cricket while playing for the Netherlands against Namibia in the 2015–17 ICC World Cricket League Championship.

In July 2019, he was selected to play for the Rotterdam Rhinos in the inaugural edition of the Euro T20 Slam cricket tournament. However, the following month the tournament was cancelled. In April 2020, he was one of seventeen Dutch-based cricketers to be named in the team's senior squad.

In January 2022, in the Dutch ODI series against Afghanistan in Qatar, Kingma was banned for four matches after being found guilty of ball tampering in the third ODI.

In May 2024, he was named in the Netherlands squad for the 2024 ICC Men's T20 World Cup tournament.

In September 2025, Kingma was suspended for three months, with the possibility of reduction to one month by undertaking a treatment program, for an anti-doping breach, where he tested positive for Benzoylecgonine following a match against the United Arab Emirates in the Cricket World Cup League 2.
