= Philippe Boissevain =

Dutch cricketer

Personal information
- Full name: Philippe Ronald Peter Boissevain
- Born: 18 October 2000 (age 26); Leidschendam, Netherlands
- Batting: Right-handed
- Bowling: Leg-break googly
- Role: Bowler

International information
- National side: Netherlands
- ODI debut (cap 73): 20 May 2021 v Scotland
- Last ODI: 17 June 2022 v England
- T20I debut (cap 46): 5 August 2019 v UAE
- Last T20I: 24 April 2021 v Nepal

Career statistics
Competition	ODI	T20I	LA	T20
Matches	6	7	9	7
Runs scored	44	14	50	14
Batting average	7.33	7.00	6.25	7.00
100s/50s	0/0	0/0	0/0	0/0
Top score	15	7*	15	7*
Balls bowled	279	162	368	162
Wickets	4	6	9	6
Bowling average	81.50	38.83	44.77	38.83
5 wickets in innings	0	0	0	0
10 wickets in match	0	0	0	0
Best bowling	2/39	2/43	3/46	2/43
Catches/stumpings	2/–	4/–	3/–	4/–
- Source: Cricinfo, 20 February 2024

Philippe Ronald Peter Boissevain (born 18 October 2000) is a Dutch international cricketer who made his debut for the Netherlands national side in August 2019.

In July 2019, he was selected to play for the Amsterdam Knights in the inaugural edition of the Euro T20 Slam cricket tournament. Later the same month, he was named in the Dutch squad for the Twenty20 International (T20I) series against the United Arab Emirates. He made his T20I debut against the United Arab Emirates on 5 August 2019.

He was part of the Dutch squad for the 2019 ICC T20 World Cup Qualifier tournament in the United Arab Emirates. He made his List A debut on 11 May 2021, for the Netherlands A team against the Ireland Wolves, during their tour of Ireland. Later the same month, he was named in the Dutch One Day International (ODI) squad for their series against Scotland. He made his ODI debut on 20 May 2021, for the Netherlands against Scotland.

In September 2021, Boissevain was named in the Dutch squad for the 2021 ICC Men's T20 World Cup. However, he did not play even a single match in that tournament.
