= Pieter Seelaar =

Dutch cricketer (born 1987)

Personal information
- Full name: Pieter Marinus Seelaar
- Born: 2 July 1987 (age 39); Schiedam, Netherlands
- Batting: Right-handed
- Bowling: Slow left-arm orthodox
- Role: All-rounder

International information
- National side: Netherlands (2006–2022)
- ODI debut (cap 31): 6 July 2006 v Sri Lanka
- Last ODI: 17 June 2022 v England
- ODI shirt no.: 8
- T20I debut (cap 7): 2 August 2008 v Kenya
- Last T20I: 22 October 2021 v Sri Lanka
- T20I shirt no.: 8

Career statistics
Competition	ODI	T20I	FC	LA
Matches	57	77	23	140
Runs scored	347	591	751	953
Batting average	11.96	17.38	24.22	14.43
100s/50s	0/0	0/1	1/2	0/2
Top score	43	96*	138*	68
Balls bowled	2,609	1,132	2,450	5,582
Wickets	57	58	35	126
Bowling average	35.68	22.24	40.97	35.07
5 wickets in innings	0	0	1	0
10 wickets in match	0	0	0	0
Best bowling	4/15	4/19	5/57	4/15
Catches/stumpings	18/–	32/–	6/–	55/–
- Source: ESPNcricinfo, 17 June 2022

Pieter Marinus Seelaar (born 2 July 1987) is a Dutch cricketer and a former captain of the national team. He is a right-handed batsman and a left-arm orthodox spin bowler. Having played for the Netherlands at the Under-15, Under-17 and Under-19 levels, he made his senior debut in a C&G Trophy game against Warwickshire on 3 May 2005. He then played in the ICC Trophy later that year. He made his One Day International debut against Sri Lanka on 6 July 2006. Two years later, Seelaar made his Twenty20 International debut.

In April 2018, he was appointed as the captain of the national team, following the retirement of Peter Borren. In June 2022, during the Dutch home series against England, a long-term back injury forced Seelaar to retire from international cricket.

== Career ==
The 2008 ICC World Twenty20 Qualifier was hosted by Ireland, the pre-tournament favourites. Of the six teams participating, the tournament marked the first time four of them, including the Netherlands, played Twenty20 Internationals (T20I). In the opening match between the Netherlands and Kenya, nine of the Netherlands players, including Seelaar, were playing not just their first T20I, but also their first Twenty20 match. Seelaar took two wickets while conceding 59 runs, and after rain prevented the final from being held, the title was shared between Ireland and the Netherlands, both of whom qualified for the 2009 World Twenty20 in England.

In April 2009, a qualifying tournament for the 2011 World Cup was held. It allowed Associate and Affiliate members of the ICC a chance to qualify for the World Cup, and the Netherlands was amongst the successful teams. Seelaar picked up seven wickets from eight matches, on average each costing over fifty runs. In June, the Netherlands participated in the World T20 in England. Though the Netherlands did not progress beyond the first round, they beat England in the opening match of the tournament, an achievement hailed by captain Jeroen Smits as "Without doubt, the biggest day in Dutch cricket history". Seelaar took three wickets in the Netherlands' two matches whilst conceding 69 runs.

The England and Wales Cricket Board launched a new one-day competition, the Clydesdale Bank 40, in 2010. As well as the 18 first-class teams from England and Wales, two overseas teams were invited to participate. The Netherlands and Scotland made up the final two teams. The Netherlands lost all but two of their twelve matches; they won one and the other was ended in no result. Seelaar was the Netherlands' leading wicket-taker in the competition with 13 dismissals at an average of 28.46 and best figures of 3 for 31 (3/31).

Seelaar was included in the Netherlands' 15-man squad for the 2011 World Cup. Losing all six of their matches, the Netherlands exited in the first round. Seelaar was the team's leading wicket-taker in the competition with eight wickets for 306 runs. Later that year the Netherlands took part in the 2011 Clydesdale Bank 40. They improved on the results of the previous year, winning five and tying one of their twelve matches. Seelaar took seven wickets at an average of 50.00.

Ten teams participated in the 2011–12 Caribbean Twenty20: seven from the Caribbean and three foreign teams chosen by invitation. The three foreign teams were Canada (who had played in the previous two editions of the tournament), while the Netherlands and Sussex County Cricket Club replaced the two teams that had taken part the previous year. Seelaar was included in the 14-man squad and took three wickets at an average of 20.66. It was believed that the Caribbean Twenty20, held in January 2012, would provide good preparation for the Netherlands' participation in the 2012 ICC World Twenty20 Qualifier in March. The UAE hosted the qualifying tournament, and though the Netherlands made it to the preliminary finals they lost to Ireland and did not qualify for the World Twenty20 later that year, with Seelaar contributing eight wickets from nine matches.

In February 2017, during the Netherlands 2015–17 ICC Intercontinental Cup match against Hong Kong, he and Ben Cooper set a new Dutch record for the highest partnership for any wicket in a first-class match and the highest sixth-wicket partnership in the Intercontinental Cup, when they made 288 runs.

In July 2018, he was named as the captain of the Netherlands' One Day International (ODI) squad, for their series against Nepal.

In July 2019, he was selected to play for the Rotterdam Rhinos in the inaugural edition of the Euro T20 Slam cricket tournament. However, the following month the tournament was cancelled.

He was named the captain of the Dutch squad for the 2019 ICC T20 World Cup Qualifier tournament in the United Arab Emirates. On 27 October 2019, in the match against Scotland, Seelaar took his 50th wicket in T20I cricket. In April 2020, he was one of seventeen Dutch-based cricketers to be named in the team's senior squad. In September 2021, Seelaar was named as the captain of the Dutch squad for the 2021 ICC Men's T20 World Cup, with the International Cricket Council (ICC) later naming him as the key player in the Dutch team.

In June 2022, during the Dutch home series against England, Seelaar was forced to retire from international cricket due to a long-term back injury.
