= Ben Cooper (cricketer) =

Dutch cricketer

Personal information
- Full name: Benjamin Nicolas Cooper
- Born: 10 February 1992 (age 34); Lismore, New South Wales, Australia
- Batting: Left-handed
- Bowling: Right-arm medium
- Role: Batsman
- Relatives: Tom Cooper (brother)

International information
- National side: Netherlands (2013–2021)
- ODI debut (cap 59): 27 August 2013 v Canada
- Last ODI: 7 June 2021 v Ireland
- ODI shirt no.: 32
- T20I debut (cap 29): 15 November 2013 v Afghanistan
- Last T20I: 22 October 2021 v Sri Lanka
- T20I shirt no.: 32

Career statistics
Competition	ODI	T20I	FC	LA
Matches	13	58	4	55
Runs scored	187	1,239	451	994
Batting average	18.70	28.15	75.16	22.08
100s/50s	0/1	0/8	1/3	1/4
Top score	74	91*	173*	109*
Catches/stumpings	2/–	35/–	2/–	19/–
- Source: Cricinfo, 25 September 2022

Benjamin Nicolas Cooper (born 10 February 1992) is an Australian–Dutch cricketer. He played for the Netherlands in the 2014 ICC World Twenty20 tournament. In January 2022, Cooper announced his retirement from international cricket.

He is the brother of fellow cricketer Tom Cooper, who also played for the Netherlands but more recently has focused on Australian domestic cricket. They are Dutch citizens by descent through their mother who was born in Dutch New Guinea.

== Career ==
Cooper made his first-class debut for the Netherlands against Scotland in the 2015–17 ICC Intercontinental Cup on 9 September 2015. He scored his maiden first-class century in his second match, against Hong Kong in February 2017, also in the Intercontinental Cup. In that match, he and Pieter Seelaar set a Dutch record for the highest partnership for any wicket in a first-class match and the highest sixth-wicket partnership in the Intercontinental Cup, when they made 288 runs.

In December 2017, in the 2015–17 ICC World Cricket League Championship, Cooper scored his first century in List A cricket and made the highest partnership for any wicket in the World Cricket League, with 236 runs, batting with Wesley Barresi.

In July 2018, Cooper was named in the Netherlands' One Day International (ODI) squad, for their series against Nepal.

In July 2019, Cooper was selected to play for the Amsterdam Knights in the inaugural edition of the Euro T20 Slam cricket tournament. However, the following month the tournament was cancelled.

In September 2019, Cooper was named in the Dutch squad for the 2019 ICC T20 World Cup Qualifier tournament in the United Arab Emirates. He was the leading run-scorer for the Netherlands in the tournament, with 246 runs in nine matches. In April 2020, he was one of seventeen Dutch-based cricketers to be named in the team's senior squad. In September 2021, Cooper was named in the Dutch squad for the 2021 ICC Men's T20 World Cup.
