= North Sea Pro Series =

- Tournament logo
- Countries: Netherlands; Scotland
- Administrator: Cricket Scotland; KNCB
- Format: 50 overs; 20 overs
- First edition: 2014
- Latest edition: 2016
- Tournament format: Double round-robin

The North Sea Pro Series was a professional cricket league featuring teams from the Netherlands and Scotland, first contested in 2014. A joint venture between the Royal Dutch Cricket Board (KNCB) and Cricket Scotland, the Pro Series comprised a 50-over tournament, the North Sea Pro 50, and a 20-over tournament, the North Sea Pro 20.

The first fully professional league in either country, the competition had been described as "formulated to bridge the gap between club and international cricket for professional cricketers". The inaugural season featured four franchises, two from the Netherlands and two from Scotland, and both the 50-over and 20-over tournaments were won by the Highlanders, a Scottish franchise.

In 2016, the North Sea 50 Trophy was held on 1 September as a final match between the Dutch 50 over champions the South Holland Seafarers and the Scottish 50 over champions Eastern Knights.

The series did not return in 2017, replaced in Scotland by the Regional Pro Series featuring three domestic franchises, the first edition of which was held in 2016.

== Background ==
Cricket Scotland and the KNCB are both associate members of the International Cricket Council (ICC), and both the Dutch and Scottish national teams have played in multiple World Cups. Both teams currently have Twenty20 International (T20I) status, while Scotland also holds One Day International (ODI) status. The impetus for the creation of the Pro Series was the exclusion of the Dutch and Scottish national sides from the new Royal London One-Day Cup, which replaced the Friends Provident Trophy as the premier limited-overs competition in England and Wales. Andy Tennant, performance director for Cricket Scotland, described the Pro Series as "an ideal opportunity for us to stand on our own two feet and begin to develop a strong domestic professional competition for our best cricketers."

The North Sea Pro Series, contested in May and early June during the 2014 season, does not overlap with the Scottish National Cricket League or the Dutch Topklasse, the top-level club competitions in each country.

== Franchises ==
Franchise	Home grounds	Captain (2014)	Coach (2014)
Highlanders	Titwood, Glasgow; Nunholm, Dumfries	Craig Wallace	Toby Bailey
Northern Hurricanes	Sportpark Het Schootsveld, Deventer; Sportpark Maarschalkerweerd, Utrecht; VRA Ground, Amstelveen	Peter Borren	–
Reivers	Forthill, Dundee; Lochlands Park, Arbroath; Raeburn Place, Edinburgh	Richie Berrington	Steven Knox
Southern Seafarers	Hazelaarweg, Rotterdam; Sportpark Duivesteijn, Voorburg; Sportpark Thurlede, Schiedam	Stephan Myburgh	–

== Seasons ==
Pro 20 championship
Year	Winner	Runner-up	3rd Place	4th Place
2014	Highlanders	Northern Hurricanes	Southern Seafarers	Reivers
2015	Highlanders	Southern Seafarers	Northern Hurricanes	Reivers

Pro 50 Championship
Year	Winner	Runner-up	3rd Place	4th Place
2014	Highlanders	Southern Seafarers	Reivers	Northern Hurricanes

== 2014 season ==
=== Squads ===
Highlanders	Hurricanes	Reivers	Seafarers
Craig Wallace (c, wk); Aman Bailwal; Calvin Burnett; Fraser Burnett; Ewan Chalmers; Alasdair Evans; Cameron Farrell; Hamish Gardiner; Chayank Gosain; Gordon Goudie; Michael Leask; George Munsey; Matthew Parker; Marc Petrie; Mark Watt	Peter Borren (c); Colin Ackermann; Rahil Ahmed; Ben Cooper; Quirijn Gunning; Mahesh Hans; Mohammad Kashif; Sverre Loggers; M. U. Malik; Mohammad Wasim; Mudassar Bukhari; Saqib Zulfiqar; Shahbaz Bashir; Sikander Zulfiqar; Vinoo Tewarie; Leon Turmaine; Paul van Meekeren; R. U. Zulfiqar	Richie Berrington (c); Niall Alexander; Scott Beveridge; Con de Lange; Michael English; Kasim Farid; Hamza Tahir; Majid Haq; Omer Hussain; Moneeb Iqbal; Scott McElnea; Graeme McLaren; Calum MacLeod; Navdeep Poonia; Abdul Sabri; Safyaan Sharif; Neil Smith; Simon Smith (wk); Andrew Umeed; Iain Wardlaw; Craig Young	Stephan Myburgh (c); Wesley Barresi; Sebastiaan Braat; Tim Etman; James Gruijters; Bobby Hanif; Tom Heggelman; Farshad Khan; Vivian Kingma; Josh Lenssen; Ahsan Malik; Hidde Overdijk; Ali Qasim; Jelte Schoonheim; Pieter Seelaar; Lesley Stokkers; Zachary van Baren; Matthijs van Schelven

=== Points table ===
Pro 20 Championship
Position	Team	Matches	Won	Lost	Tied	No Result	Points
1	Highlanders	6	6	0	0	0	24
2	Northern Hurricanes	6	2	3	0	1	10
3	Southern Seafarers	6	1	3	0	2	8
4	Reivers	6	1	4	0	1	6

Pro 50 Championship
Position	Team	Matches	Won	Lost	Tied	No Result	Points
1	Highlanders	6	3	1	0	2	19
2	Southern Seafarers	6	2	1	0	3	15
3	Reivers	6	2	3	0	1	11
4	Northern Hurricanes	6	1	3	0	2	8

== 2015 season ==
Pro 20 Championship
Position	Team	Matches	Won	Lost	Tied	No result	Points
1	Highlanders	12	10	1	0	1	42
2	Southern Seafarers	12	5	6	0	1	22
3	Northern Hurricanes	12	3	6	0	3	18
4	Reivers	12	2	7	0	3	14
