= 2011–2013 ICC Intercontinental Cup =

2011–13 ICC Intercontinental Cup
- Dates: 21 June 2011 – 14 December 2013
- Administrator: International Cricket Council
- Cricket format: First-class cricket
- Tournament format(s): Round-robin and final
- Champions: Ireland (4th title)
- Runners-up: Afghanistan
- Participants: 8
- Matches: 29
- Most runs: (United Arab Emirates) Khurram Khan (674)
- Most wickets: (Namibia) Christi Viljoen (39)

The 2011–13 ICC Intercontinental Cup is the sixth edition of the ICC Intercontinental Cup, an international first-class cricket tournament between leading associate members of the International Cricket Council. The tournament will run from June 2011 to October 2013. The format has been changed since the 2009–10 edition. The previous two-division system has been replaced by a single eight-team division, comprising the six teams from 2010 ICC World Cricket League Division One (Afghanistan, Canada, Ireland, Kenya, Netherlands, and Scotland) and the top two teams from 2011 ICC World Cricket League Division Two (Namibia and United Arab Emirates).

For the first time, a one-day tournament, the 2011–13 ICC World Cricket League Championship, will run in parallel with the first-class tournament.

== Fixtures ==
The breakdown of fixtures for the ICC Intercontinental Cup 2011–13 is as follows:

Round	Window	Home	Away
Round 1	June – July 2011	Ireland	Namibia
Round 1	June – July 2011	Scotland	Netherlands
Round 1	June – July 2011	Kenya	United Arab Emirates
Round 1	June – July 2011	Canada	Afghanistan
Round 2	September – October 2011	Ireland	Canada
Round 2	September – October 2011	Namibia	Scotland
Round 2	September – October 2011	Netherlands	Kenya
Round 2	September – October 2011	Afghanistan	United Arab Emirates
Round 3	March – April 2012	Afghanistan	Netherlands
Round 3	March – April 2012	United Arab Emirates	Scotland
Round 3	March – April 2012	Kenya	Ireland
Round 3	March – April 2012	Namibia	Canada
Round 4	June – July 2012	Ireland	Afghanistan
Round 4	June – July 2012	Kenya	Namibia
Round 4	June – July 2012	Scotland	Canada
Round 4	June – July 2012	Netherlands	United Arab Emirates
Round 5	March – April 2013	Kenya	Canada
Round 5	March – April 2013	Namibia	Netherlands
Round 5	March – April 2013	United Arab Emirates	Ireland
Round 5	March – April 2013	Afghanistan	Scotland
Round 6	July – August 2013	Canada	United Arab Emirates
Round 6	July – August 2013	Scotland	Kenya
Round 6	July – August 2013	Netherlands	Ireland
Round 6	July – August 2013	Namibia	Afghanistan
Round 7	September – October 2013	Ireland	Scotland
Round 7	September – October 2013	Afghanistan	Kenya
Round 7	September – October 2013	Canada	Netherlands
Round 7	September – October 2013	United Arab Emirates	Namibia
Final	December 2013	Ireland vs. Afghanistan	

== Points table ==
Team	Pld	W	L	T	D	FI	A	Pts	Q
Ireland	7	5	0	0	2	6	0	116	+1.891
Afghanistan	7	5	0	0	2	4	0	104	+1.228
Scotland	7	2	2	0	2	3	1	66	+0.934
United Arab Emirates	7	2	1	0	4	2	0	60	+0.942
Namibia	7	3	3	0	1	2	0	57	+0.958
Canada	7	1	4	0	1	2	1	43	+0.856
Kenya	7	1	5	0	0	3	1	42	+0.720
Netherlands	7	0	4	0	2	2	1	36	+0.761

- Win – 14 points
- Draw if more than 10 hours of play lost – 7 points (otherwise 3 points)
- First Innings leader – 6 points (independent of result)
- Abandoned without a ball played – 10 points.

== Matches ==
=== Round 1 ===
21–24 June 2011
Scorecard

Scotland	v	Netherlands
309 (107 overs); Majid Haq 120* (292); Mudassar Bukhari 5/79 (26 overs)		306/8 (70 overs); Neil Kruger 91 (150); Preston Mommsen 3/67 (11 overs)

Match drawn
Mannofield Park, Aberdeen, Scotland
Umpires: Niels Bagh (Den) and Peter Nero (WI)

- Netherlands won the toss and elected to field.
- No play on Days 1 and 2 due to rain.
- Ahsan Malik (Ned) made his first-class debut.
- Points: Scotland 7, Netherlands 7

28–31 July 2011
Scorecard

United Arab Emirates	v	Kenya
213 (67.3 overs); Khurram Khan 85 (143); Hiren Varaiya 4/45 (16.3 overs)		219 (70.5 overs); Rajesh Bhudia 44 (41); Amjad Javed 3/43 (17 overs)
439/8d (114.2 overs); Saqib Ali 153 (285); Lucas Oluoch 3/63 (21 overs)		167 (61.1 overs); Collins Obuya 63 (100); Mohammad Tauqir 2/35 (17 overs)

United Arab Emirates won by 266 runs
Gymkhana Club Ground, Nairobi, Kenya
Umpires: Shaun George (SA) and Russell Tiffin (Zim)

- United Arab Emirates won the toss and elected to bat.
- Runish Gudhka, Mansukh Jesani, Ramesh Mepani, Lucas Oluoch, Samarth Patel and Dominic Wesonga (all Ken) made their first-class debuts.
- Points: United Arab Emirates 14, Kenya 6

2–5 August 2011
Scorecard

Afghanistan	v	Canada
293 (81.1 overs); Samiullah Shenwari 70 (122); Zahid Hussain 3/56 (25 overs)		130 (48 overs); Zeeshan Siddiqi 52 (70); Hamid Hassan 7/61 (21 overs)
69/1 (11.3 overs); Karim Sadiq 37* (37); Zahid Hussain 1/16 (4 overs)		231 (85.5 overs) (f/o); Hamza Tariq 52 (64); Hamid Hassan 3/24 (6 overs)

Afghanistan won by 9 wickets
Maple Leaf North-West Ground, King City, Ontario, Canada
Umpires: Jeff Luck (Nam) and Ranmore Martinesz (Sri)

- Canada won the toss and elected to field.
- Amir Hamza, Dawlat Zadran (Afg) and Tyson Gordon (Can) all made their first-class debuts.
- Points: Afghanistan 20, Canada 0

6–9 September 2011
Scorecard

Namibia	v	Ireland
244 (70.1 overs); Louis van der Westhuizen 65 (54); George Dockrell 5/71 (22 overs)		298 (83.5 overs); Andrew White 123* (213); Christi Viljoen 5/87 (23.5 overs)
226 (79.3 overs); Christi Viljoen 87 (136); George Dockrell 3/41 (22.3 overs)		176/5 (40.2 overs); Paul Stirling 53 (44); Louis van der Westhuizen 2/21 (6 overs)

Ireland won by 5 wickets
Civil Service Cricket Club Ground, Belfast, Northern Ireland
Umpires: Buddhi Pradhan (Nep) and Richard Smith (Ger)

- Ireland won the toss and elected to field.
- Match was originally scheduled for 28 June – 1 July but was pushed back due to visa issues.
- Graeme McCarter (Ire) and Gerhard Erasmus (Nam) both made their first-class debuts.
- Points: Ireland 20, Namibia 0

=== Round 2 ===
7–10 September 2011
Scorecard

Netherlands	v	Kenya

Match abandoned due to rain
Sportpark Het Schootsveld, Deventer, Netherlands
Umpires: Johanes Cloete (SA) and Ian Ramage (Sco)

- Points: Netherlands 10, Kenya 10

13–16 September 2011
Scorecard

Ireland	v	Canada
462 (104.5 overs); PR Stirling 107 (121); Khurram Chohan 4/101 (23.5 overs)		194 (44 overs); Ruvindu Gunasekera 66 (71); Albert van der Merwe 5/70 (13 overs)
		257 (49 overs) (f/o); Rizwan Cheema 97 (45); Albert van der Merwe 3/61 (14 overs)

Ireland won by an innings and 11 runs
Observatory Lane, Rathmines, Dublin, Ireland
Umpires: Niels Bagh (Den) and Mark Hawthorne (Ire)

- Ireland won the toss and elected to bat.
- Manny Aulakh (Can) made his first-class debut.
- Points: Ireland 20, Canada 0

23–26 September 2011
Scorecard

Scotland	v	Namibia
350 (115.4 overs); Ryan Flannigan 102 (222); Christi Viljoen 5/94 (23 overs)		263 (86.1 overs); Craig Williams 51 (89); Majid Haq 6/32 (27.1 overs)
296/5d (87 overs); Preston Mommsen 102 (197); Louis van der Westhuizen 2/64 (23 overs)		218/4 (74 overs); Gerrie Snyman 88 (97); Richie Berrington 2/38 (8 overs)

Match drawn
Wanderers Cricket Ground, Windhoek, Namibia
Umpires: Jeff Luck (Nam) and Ranmore Martinesz (Sri)

- Namibia won the toss and elected to field.
- Safyaan Sharif (Sco) made his first-class debut.
- Points: Namibia 3, Scotland 9

5–8 October 2011
Scorecard

United Arab Emirates	v	Afghanistan
462 (117.1 overs); Bakhtiyar Palekar 76 (60); Dawlat Zadran 4/98 (22 overs)		328 (112.4 overs); Mohammad Nabi 117 (195); Arshad Ali 6/45 (19.4 overs)
228 (73 overs); Swapnil Patil 79 (137); Mirwais Ashraf 4/20 (13 overs)		131/7 (80 overs); Javed Ahmadi 49 (84); Arshad Ali 3/30 (16 overs)

Match drawn
Sharjah Cricket Association Stadium, Sharjah, UAE
Umpires: Ahsan Raza (Pak) and Buddhi Pradhan (Nep)

- United Arab Emirates won the toss and elected to bat.
- Bakthiyar Palekar and Vikrant Shetty (UAE) both made their first-class debuts.
- Points: Afghanistan 3, United Arab Emirates 9

=== Round 3 ===
12–15 February 2012
Scorecard

Ireland	v	Kenya
75 (33.5 overs); Ed Joyce 26 (53); Hiren Varaiya 6/22 (10 overs)		109 (35.1 overs); Ragheb Aga 46 (73); George Dockrell 5/37 (13 overs)
152 (49 overs); Ed Joyce 54 (64); Hiren Varaiya 6/51 (22 overs)		108 (47.2 overs); Nelson Odhiambo 32 (102); Albert van der Merwe 6/27 (18.2 overs)

Ireland win by 10 runs
Mombasa Sports Club, Mombasa, Kenya
Umpires: David Odhiambo (Ken) and Russell Tiffin (Zim)

- Ireland won the toss and elected to bat.
- Max Sorensen (Ire), Duncan Allan, Irfan Karim and Shem Ngoche (Ken) all made their first-class debuts.
- Points: Kenya 6, Ireland 14

16–19 February 2012
Scorecard

United Arab Emirates	v	Scotland
100 (40.1 overs); Amjad Javed 24 (43); Gordon Goudie 3/22 (9.1 overs)		305 (117.5 overs); Richie Berrington 110 (242); Fayyaz Ahmed 3/63 (26 overs)
318 (139.2 overs); Saqib Ali 77 (192); Gordon Goudie 3/63 (22 overs)		117/3 (37.2 overs); Richie Berrington 42* (60); Sharif Asadullah 1/4 (5 overs)

Scotland won by 7 wickets
Sharjah Cricket Association Stadium, Sharjah, UAE
Umpires: Sudhir Asnani (Ind) and Shahul Hameed (Ina)

- United Arab Emirates won the toss and elected to bat.
- Freddie Coleman (Sco) and Faizan Asif (UAE) both made their first-class debuts.
- Points: United Arab Emirates 0, Scotland 20

2–5 April 2012
Scorecard

Netherlands	v	Afghanistan
133 (44.3 overs); Tom Heggelman 29 (43); Izatullah Dawlatzai 4/24 (12 overs)		129 (42.3 overs); Nawroz Mangal 67 (80); Mudassar Bukhari 6/43 (16.3 overs)
228 (61.4 overs); Tom Heggelman 59 (114); Izatullah Dawlatzai 5/45 (14.4 overs)		233/7 (75.5 overs); Afsar Zazai 84* (156); Pieter Seelaar 3/60 (22 overs)

Afghanistan won by 3 wickets
Sharjah Cricket Association Stadium, Sharjah, UAE
Umpires: Chris Gaffaney (NZ) and Sarika Prasad (Sin)

- Afghanistan won the toss and elected to field.
- Afsar Zazai (Afg) and Tim Gruijters (Ned) both made their first-class debuts.
- Points: Afghanistan 14, Netherlands 6

5–8 April 2012
Scorecard

Canada	v	Namibia
274 (94.5 overs); Zeeshan Siddiqi 87 (132); Sarel Burger 4/42 (19 overs)		374 (126.2 overs); Sarel Burger 135 (261); Durand Soraine 4/66 (22.2 overs)
213 (75 overs); Zeeshan Siddiqi 73* (147); Christi Viljoen 7/61 (25 overs)		119/2 (25.4 overs); Ewald Steenkamp 60 (60); Ruvindu Gunasekera 2/18 (4 overs)

Namibia won by 8 wickets
Wanderers Cricket Ground, Windhoek, Namibia
Umpires: Owen Chirombe (Zim) and Jeff Luck (Nam)

- Namibia won the toss and elected to field.
- Points: Namibia 20, Canada 0

=== Round 4 ===
4–7 July 2012
Scorecard

Scotland	v	Canada

Match abandoned due to rain
Bothwell Castle Cricket Ground, Uddingston, Scotland
Umpires: Mark Hawthorne (Ire) and Ian Ramage (Sco)

- Points: Scotland 10, Canada 10

9–12 July 2012
Scorecard

Afghanistan	v	Ireland
84 (29.1 overs); Gulbodin Naib 13 (10); Alex Cusack 4/31 (10 overs)		251/4d (60.1 overs); Gary Wilson 73 (100); Mohammad Nabi 1/24 (6.1 overs)
208/7 (67 overs); Javed Ahmadi 59 (94); Stuart Thompson 3/51 (12 overs)

Match drawn
Observatory Lane, Rathmines, Dublin, Ireland
Umpires: Shaun George (SA) and Richard Smith (Ire)

- Ireland won the toss and elected to field.
- No play on Days 1 and 2 due to rain.
- Gulbadin Naib, Najibullah Zadran (Afg) and Stuart Thompson (Ire) made their first-class debuts.
- Points: Ireland 13, Afghanistan 7

16–19 July 2012
Scorecard

Netherlands	v	United Arab Emirates
308 (98.5 overs); Shahbaz Bashir 102 (157); Amjad Javed 4/49 (21.5 overs)		74/2 (41 overs); Shaiman Anwar 20* (81); Shahbaz Bashir 1/5 (9 overs)

Match drawn
Sportpark Het Schootsveld, Deventer, Netherlands
Umpires: Vineet Kulkarni (Ind) and Buddhi Pradhan (Nep)

- United Arab Emirates won the toss and elected to field.
- No play on Days 2 and 4 due to rain.
- Sebastiaan Braat, Shahbaz Bashir (Ned) and Haroon Iftikhar (UAE) all made their first-class debuts.
- Points: Netherlands 7, United Arab Emirates 7

29 September–2 October 2012
Scorecard

Kenya	v	Namibia
304 (99.3 overs); Tanmay Mishra 108 (200); Christi Viljoen 4/107 (29 overs)		630/7 d (143.5 overs); Gerrie Snyman 201* (192); Nelson Odhiambo 3/93 (25 overs)
325 (108.1 overs); Irfan Karim 59 (127); Christi Viljoen 3/72 (28 overs)

Namibia won by an innings and 1 run
Wanderers Cricket Ground, Windhoek, Namibia
Umpires: David Odhiambo (Ken) and Russell Tiffin (Zim)

- Kenya won the toss and elected to bat.
- Match was originally scheduled for 6–9 June but was pushed back due to security reasons.
- Jason Davidson (Nam) made his first-class debut.
- Match moved from Gymkhana Club Ground, Nairobi, Kenya due to security reasons.
- Points: Namibia 20, Kenya 0

=== Round 5 ===
12–15 March 2013
Scorecard

Scotland	v	Afghanistan
125 (37.5 overs); Robert Taylor 48* (54); Izatullah Dawlatzai 6/57 (16 overs)		275 (102.3 overs); Rahmat Shah 67* (196); Josh Davey 4/53 (22.3 overs)
145 (49 overs); Kyle Coetzer 57 (124); Izatullah Dawlatzai 5/37 (15 overs)

Afghanistan won by an innings and 5 runs
Sheikh Zayed Cricket Stadium, Abu Dhabi, UAE
Umpires: Sarika Prasad (Sin) and Shozab Raza (Pak)

- Afghanistan won the toss and elected to field.
- Mohibullah Oryakhel and Rahmat Shah (Afg) both made their first-class debuts.
- Points: Afghanistan 20, Scotland 0

12–15 March 2013
Scorecard

Ireland	v	United Arab Emirates
589/7 d (164 overs); Ed Joyce 155 (172); Khurram Khan 2/48 (13 overs)		360 (137.1 overs); Khurram Khan 115 (232); Trent Johnston 4/62 (26.1 overs)
188/3 (58 overs); William Porterfield 101* (165); Rohan Mustafa 1/13 (5 overs)

Match drawn
Sharjah Cricket Association Stadium, Sharjah, UAE
Umpires: Vineet Kulkarni (Ind) and Buddhi Pradhan (Nep)

- United Arab Emirates won the toss and elected to field.
- Mohammad Azam, Mohammad Naveed, Rohan Mustafa and Saqib Shah (UAE) all made their first-class debuts.
- Points: Ireland 9, United Arab Emirates 3

18–21 March 2013
Scorecard

Canada	v	Kenya
358 (129.2 overs); Nitish Kumar 89 (205); Elijah Otieno 3/50 (21 overs)		406 (116.2 overs); Rakep Patel 130 (166); Rayyan Pathan 3/76 (26 overs)
175 (77.3 overs); Hiral Patel 93 (193); Nehemiah Odhiambo 5/43 (15.3 overs)		129/6 (31.5 overs); Tanmay Mishra 38* (67); Hiral Patel 4/41 (11.5 overs)

Kenya won by 4 wickets
ICC Global Cricket Academy, Dubai, UAE
Umpires: David Odhiambo (Ken) and Buddhi Pradhan (Nep)

- Kenya won the toss and elected to field.
- Nikhil Dutta, Rayyan Pathan and Raza-ur-Rehman (Can) all made their first-class debuts.
- Points: Kenya 20, Canada 0

11–14 April 2013
Scorecard

Namibia	v	Netherlands
276 (106.5 overs); Raymond van Schoor 110 (184); Timm van der Gugten 7/68 (31.5 overs)		293 (83.2 overs); Tom Cooper 83 (111); Christi Viljoen 4/76 (26 overs)
336 (87.0 overs); Stephan Baard 85 (141); Timm van der Gugten 3/53 (18 overs)		237 (71.1 overs); Tom Cooper 109 (173); Bernard Scholtz 5/58 (23.1 overs)

Namibia won by 82 runs
Wanderers Cricket Ground, Windhoek, Namibia
Umpires: Shaun George (SA) and Wynand Louw (Nam)

- Netherlands won the toss and elected to field.
- Points: Namibia 14, Netherlands 6

=== Round 6 ===
1–4 July 2013
Scorecard

Ireland	v	Netherlands
332 (114.5 overs); John Anderson 127 (310); Daniel Doram 5/82 (23 overs)		148 (60.2 overs); Tom Cooper 51 (128); George Dockrell 3/32 (15.2 overs)
222/8d (73.3 overs); Andrew White 62 (121); Pieter Seelaar 2/39 (11 overs)		127 (44.2 overs); Peter Borren 33 (43); George Dockrell 6/39 (13.2 overs)

Ireland won by 279 runs
Sportpark Het Schootsveld, Deventer, Netherlands
Umpires: Mark Hawthorne (Ire) and Chris Gaffaney (NZ)

- Ireland won the toss and elected to bat.
- Daniel Doram, James Gruijters and Quirijn Gunning (Ned) all made their first-class debuts.
- Points: Ireland 20, Netherlands 0
- Ireland qualify for the final.

7–9 July 2013
Scorecard

Scotland	v	Kenya
212 (85.5 overs); Calum MacLeod 67 (143); James Ngoche 4/58 (21.5 overs)		101 (51.3 overs); Duncan Allan 32 (89); Alasdair Evans 6/30 (15.3 overs)
230 (87.5 overs); Ewan Chalmers 106 (221); Hiren Varaiya 5/62 (32 overs)		189 (53.5 overs); Collins Obuya 91* (138); Gordon Goudie 2/35 (12 overs)

Scotland won by 152 runs
Mannofield Park, Aberdeen, Scotland
Umpires: Gregory Brathwaite (WI) and Ian Ramage (Sco)

- Scotland won the toss and elected to bat.
- Craig Wallace (Sco) made his first-class debut.
- Points: Scotland 20, Kenya 0

1–4 August 2013
Scorecard

United Arab Emirates	v	Canada
116 (38.5 overs); Swapnil Patil 76 (95); Jeremy Gordon 6/43 (13.5 overs)		369/6d (86.3 overs); Damodar Daesrath 111 (104); Amjad Javed 3/72 (17.3 overs)
207/4 (90 overs); Khurram Khan 121* (264); Jeremy Gordon 2/34 (18 overs)

Match drawn
Maple Leaf North-West Ground, King City, Ontario, Canada
Umpires: Sameer Bandekar (USA) and Simon Fry (Aus)
Player of the match: Jeremy Gordon (Canada)

- Rain prevented play on the first day.
- Start of play on the second day was delayed due to a wet outfield.
- Nasir Aziz (UAE) made his first-class debut.
- Points: Canada 13, UAE 7

4–6 August 2013
Scorecard

Namibia	v	Afghanistan
190 (64.2 overs); Stephan Baard 72 (106); Mohammad Nabi 6/33 (17.2 overs)		354 (129.5 overs); Ashgar Stanikzai 127 (259); Bernard Scholtz 5/123 (40 overs)
168 (66.5 overs); Sarel Burger 44* (93); Izatullah Dawlatzai 5/23 (10.5 overs)		5/0 (1.1 overs); Nawroz Mangal 4 (3)

Afghanistan won by 10 wickets
Wanderers Cricket Ground, Windhoek, Namibia
Umpires: Adrian Holdstock (SA) and Wynand Louw (Nam)

- Maris Delport (Nam) made his first-class debut.
- Points: Afghanistan 20, Namibia 0

=== Round 7 ===
22–25 August 2013
Scorecard

Netherlands	v	Canada
164 (49.3 overs); Eric Szwarczynski 57 (72); Raza-ur-Rehman 4/8 (8.3 overs)		436 (91.2 overs); Ruvindu Gunasekera 150 (173); Vivian Kingma 4/89 (19.2 overs)
336 (78.3 overs); Eric Szwarczynski 85 (111); Harvir Baidwan 4/69 (19.3 overs)		68/2 (7.1 overs); Ruvindu Gunasekera 44 (24); Michael Swart 1/1 (1 over)

Canada won by 8 wickets
Maple Leaf Cricket Club, King City, Canada
Umpires: Gregory Brathwaite (WI) and Peter Nero (WI)

- Canada won the toss and elected to field.
- Cecil Pervez and Salman Nazar made their first class debuts for Canada.
- Vivian Kingma and Paul van Meekeren made their first class debuts for the Netherlands.
- Points: Canada 20, Netherlands 0

11–14 September 2013
Scorecard

Ireland	v	Scotland
350 (85.3 overs); Stirling 65 (101); Iqbal 4/68 (13 overs)		138 (50.1 overs); Sharif 41 (68); Young 4/53 (13.1 overs)
		168 (60.1 overs); Sharif 60 (94); Sorensen 5/37 (18.1 overs)

Ireland won by an innings and 44 runs
Castle Avenue, Dublin, Ireland
Umpires: Johan Cloete and Richard Smith

- Ireland won the toss and elected to field.
- Andrew McBrine and Craig Young (cricketer) made their first class debuts for Ireland.
- Hamish Gardiner made his first class debut for Scotland.
- Points: Ireland 20, Scotland 0

22–25 September 2013
Scorecard

United Arab Emirates	v	Namibia
230 (66.4 overs); Anwar 81 (90); Viljoen 4/32 (12 overs)		90 (48.4 overs); Kotze 19 (62); Raza 7/37 (20.4 overs)
17/1 (3.3 overs); Ali 14 (14); Smit 1/11 (2 overs)		155 (60.5 overs); Van der Westhuizen 49 (49); Aziz 5/48 (19.5 overs)

United Arab Emirates won by 9 wickets
Sharjah Cricket Association Stadium, Sharjah, United Arab Emirates
Umpires: Enamul Haque and Sarika Prasad
Player of the match: Ahmed Raza

- Namibia won the toss and elected to bat
- Michau du Preez and Tiaan Snyman made their first class debuts for Namibia
- Kamran Shazad made their first class debuts for United Arab Emirates
- Points: United Arab Emirates 20, Namibia 0

6–9 October 2013
Scorecard

Afghanistan	v	Kenya
234 (90.4 overs); Shah 144 (284); Aga 5/46 (16.4 overs)		162 (55.4 overs); Odhiambo; Ahmadzai 2/23 (10 overs)
70/2 (14.5 overs); Ahmadi 28 (46); Odhiambo 1/9 (3 overs)		140 (44.2 overs); Varaiya 36 (56); Shirzad 3/17 (9 overs)

Afghanistan won by 8 wickets
ICC Global Cricket Academy, Dubai, UAE
Umpires: Ruchira Palliyaguru and Buddhi Pradhan
Player of the match: Rahmat Shah

- Afghanistan won the toss and elected to field
- Fazal Niazai, Hashmatullah Shahidi, Nasim Baras, Rahmatullah Sahaq, Sayed Shirzad and Yamin Ahmadzai made their first class debuts for Afghanistan.
- Points: Afghanistan 20, Kenya 0

=== Final ===
10–14 December 2013
Scorecard

Ireland	v	Afghanistan
187 (61 overs); John Anderson 55 (111); Dawlat Zadran 4/44 (16 overs)		182 (77.5 overs); Mohammad Nabi 42 (86); John Mooney 5/45 (14 overs)
341 (95.1 overs); Niall O'Brien 87 (198); Mohammad Nabi 4/38 (25.1 overs)		224 (94.5 overs); Rahmat Shah 86* (251); John Mooney 5/36 (19.5 overs)

Ireland won by 122 runs
ICC Global Cricket Academy, Dubai, UAE
Umpires: Sarika Prasad (Sin) and Tim Robinson (Eng)
Player of the match: John Mooney

- Afghanistan won the toss and elected to field.

== Statistics ==
=== Most runs ===
Player	Team	Matches	Innings	Runs	Average	HS	100s	50s
Khurram Khan	United Arab Emirates	7	11	674	74.88	121*	3	2
Andrew White (cricketer, born 1980)	Ireland	7	11	419	52.37	123*	1	3
Swapnil Patil	United Arab Emirates	5	8	401	66.83	89*	0	4
Gerrie Snyman	Namibia	4	7	399	79.80	201*	1	1
Sarel Burger	Namibia	5	9	393	56.14	135	1	2

=== Most wickets ===
Player	Team	Matches	Overs	Wickets	Average	BBI	5W
Christi Viljoen	Namibia	7	267.5	39	20.97	7/61	3
George Dockrell	Ireland	5	182.1	33	16.57	6/39	3
Izatullah Dawlatzai	Afghanistan	5	122.3	30	13.36	6/57	4
Majid Haq	Scotland	6	191.0	26	16.73	6/32	1
Hiren Varaiya	Kenya	6	214.5	26	22.26	6/22	3
