= List of Netherlands first-class cricketers =

Cricketers List

First-class cricket is an official classification of the highest-standard international or domestic matches in the sport of cricket. A first-class match is of three or more days' scheduled duration between two sides of eleven players each and is officially adjudged to be worthy of the status by virtue of the standard of the competing teams. Matches must allow for the teams to play two innings each although, in practice, a team might play only one innings or none at all.

The Netherlands national cricket team (Dutch: Nederland se cricketteam) is the team that represents Netherlands and is administered by the Royal Dutch Cricket Association. Cricket has been played in the Netherlands since at least the 19th century, and in the 1860s was considered a major sport in the country. Other sports – notably football – have long since surpassed cricket in popularity amongst the Dutch, but today there are around 6,000 cricketers in the Netherlands. The first national association, the forerunner of today's Royal Dutch Cricket Association, was formed in 1883 and the Netherlands achieved Associate Membership of the International Cricket Council (ICC) in 1966.

In 2004 Netherlands first played first-class cricket in the ICC Intercontinental Cup, drawing with Scotland in Aberdeen and then going down to an innings defeat against Ireland in Deventer. Netherlands played 33 first-class matches in total, with majority of them against Ireland and Scotland. In total, 50 Dutchmen have made first-class appearances for Netherlands. Peter Borren has played as well as captained more first-class matches for Netherlands than any other Dutchman.

Captain Peter Borren is also the Netherlands' leading run-scorer at first-class level, aggregating 1331 runs. Nineteen centuries including two double centuries have been scored by ten Dutch batsmen in this format. Ryan ten Doeschate's unbeaten 259 runs, scored against Canada in 2006 is the highest individual score by a Dutch batsmen, while he has also the team's best batting average: 142.77. Among the bowlers, Edgar Schiferli and Peter Borren has taken more wickets than any other, claiming 41 wickets each. On the contrary, Timm van der Gugten has the best bowling figures in an innings representing Netherlands, who picked up 7 wickets conceding 68 runs against Namibia in 2013.

Players are initially listed in alphabetical order of their referred name.

== Key ==
General

- † – Wicket-keeper
- First – Year of first-class debut for Netherlands
- Last – Year of latest first-class match for Netherlands
- Mat – Number of first-class appearances for Netherlands

Batting

- Runs – Runs scored in career
- HS – Highest score
- Avg – Runs scored per dismissal
- * – Batsman remained not out

Bowling

- Overs – Overs bowled in career
- Wkt – Wickets taken in career
- BBI – Best bowling in an innings
- Ave – Average runs per wicket

Fielding

- Ca – Catches taken
- St – Stumpings effected

== List of first-class cricketers ==
Netherlands first-class players
No.	Name	First	Last	Mat	Runs	HS	Avg	Overs	Wkt	BBI	Ave	Ca	St	Ref(s)
No.	Name	First	Last	Mat	Batting			Bowling				Fielding		Ref(s)
1	Adeel Raja	2004	2010	7	62	28	6.88	125.2	7	2/82	59.85	0	0	
2	Rahil Ahmed	2015	2016	2	18	8	4.50	–	–	–	–	1	0	
3	Ahsan Malik	2011	2016	4	36	21	18.00	93.5	8	3/55	28.87	1	0	
4	Ali Ahmed	2017	2017	1	9	9*	–	10.00	0	–	–	1	0	
5	Rifaiz Bakas	2008	2008	1	16	16	8.00	–	–	–	–	0	0	
6	Wesley Barresi	2009	2017	18	608	81	17.88	10.00	3	3/42	16.00	32	4	
7	Peter Borren	2006	2017	27	1331	109	27.16	532.5	41	4/1	40.29	40	0	
8	Sebastiaan Braat	2012	2013	2	28	23	14.00	27.0	0	–	–	0	0	
9	Jeroen Brand	2009	2009	1	30	20	15.00	4.0	0	–	–	1	0	
10	Mudassar Bukhari	2007	2016	12	424	66*	21.20	318.1	34	6/43	27.70	2	0	
11	Atse Buurman	2007	2010	5	176	41	19.55	–	–	–	–	16	1	
12	Ben Cooper	2015	2017	4	451	173*	75.16	–	–	–	–	2	0	
13	Tom Cooper	2011	2013	4	341	109	48.71	46.3	3	2/43	56.33	5	0	
14	Steven de Bruin	2010	2012	2	48	32	16.00	–	–	–	–	5	0	
15	Tom de Grooth	2004	2012	20	892	196	26.23	7.3	1	1/2	36.00	7	0	
16	Bas de Leede	2017	2017	1	61	56*	61.00	–	–	–	–	0	0	
17	Tim de Leede	2006	2006	1	23	23	11.50	13.0	0	–	–	0	0	
18	Wilfred Diepeveen	2010	2010	3	171	72*	34.20	–	–	–	–	2	0	
19	Daniel Doram	2013	2015	2	30	14	30.00	54.4	8	5/82	22.62	2	0	
20	Scott Edwards	2017	2017	1	5	5	5.00	–	–	–	–	5	1	
21	Jacob-Jan Esmeijer	2004	2004	2	37	23	12.33	27.0	1	1/51	107.00	1	0	
22	Sebastiaan Gokke	2004	2005	3	13	10	4.33	63.0	8	4/77	29.25	1	0	
23	James Gruijters	2013	2013	1	5	5	2.50	–	–	–	–	1	0	
24	Tim Gruijters	2012	2016	6	95	29	8.63	1.0	0	–	–	1	0	
25	Quirijn Gunning	2013	2017	5	44	17	8.80	110.0	9	2/10	44.33	2	0	
26	Tom Heggelman	2010	2013	4	202	59	33.66	31.0	3	2/41	40.66	2	0	
27	Mark Jonkman	2006	2010	6	144	43*	20.57	143.0	15	5/21	27.93	3	0	
28	Maurits Jonkman	2007	2010	4	62	18*	10,33	70.0	8	2/63	37.12	1	0	
29	Alexei Kervezee	2005	2010	11	514	98	34.26	26.0	2	1/14	41.00	4	0	
30	Vivian Kingma	2013	2017	6	10	5*	2.00	158.3	24	4/36	22.29	1	0	
31	Feiko Kloppenburg	2004	2004	1	0	0	0.00							
32	Somesh Kohli	2007	2008	2	13	5*	6.50							
33	Neil Kruger	2011	2011	1	91	91	91.00							
34	Bernard Loots	2010	2010	2	11	5	3.66							
35	Mohammad Kashif	2006	2010	6	59	24*	11.80							
36														
37														
38														
39														
40														
41														
42														
43														
44														
45														
46														
47														
48														
49														
50														

== List of captains ==
Netherlands first-class captains
No.	Name	First	Last	Mat	Won	Lost	Tie	Draw	Win%
1	Luuk van Troost	2004	2006	4	0	1	0	3	0.00
2	Jeroen Smits	2005	2008	7	4	2	0	1	57.14
3	Bas Zuiderent	2005	2005	1	0	0	0	1	0.00
4	Peter Borren	2007	2017	19	3	12	0	4	15.78
5	Nick Statham	2010	2010	1	0	1	0	0	0.00
6	Michael Swart	2012	2012	1	0	0	0	1	0.00
Total				33	7	16	0	10	30.43

== See also ==
- Netherlands national cricket team
- First-class cricket
- List of Netherlands One Day International cricketers
- List of Netherlands Twenty20 International cricketers
