= Bangladeshi cricket team in Ireland and Netherlands in 2012 =

The Bangladesh national cricket team toured Ireland for a 3 match Twenty20 series held in Belfast against Ireland. The Bangladesh team then travelled to the Netherlands for a T20I match each against Scotland and the Netherlands.

== Squads ==
T20Is
Bangladesh	Ireland	Scotland	Netherlands
Mushfiqur Rahim (c) & (wk)	William Porterfield (c)	Gordon Drummond (c)	Peter Borren (c)
Mahmudullah	Alex Cusack	Richie Berrington	Ahsan Malik
Tamim Iqbal	George Dockrell	Calvin Burnett	Wesley Barresi
Mohammad Ashraful	Trent Johnston	Kyle Coetzer	Tom Cooper
Junaid Siddique	Ed Joyce	Josh Davey	Tom de Grooth
Jahurul Islam	John Mooney	Alasdair Evans	Tim Gruijters
Shakib Al Hasan	Tim Murtagh	Ryan Flannigan	Tom Heggelman
Nasir Hossain	Kevin O'Brien	Gordon Goudie	Mudassar Bukhari
Ziaur Rahman	Niall O'Brien	Majid Haq	Pieter Seelaar
Elias Sunny	Andrew Poynter	Calum MacLeod	Shahbaz Bashir
Abdur Razzak	Boyd Rankin	Preston Mommsen	Michael Swart
Mashrafe Mortaza	Max Sorensen	Jan Stander	Eric Szwarczynski
Shafiul Islam	Paul Stirling	Craig Wallace (wk)	Timm van der Gugten
Nazmul Hossain	Andrew White		
Abul Hasan	Gary Wilson (wk)		

== In Ireland ==
Bangladeshi cricket team in Ireland in 2012
	Bangladesh	Ireland
- Dates: 18 July 2012 – 21 July
Captains	Mushfiqur Rahim	William Porterfield

Twenty20 International series
- Results: Bangladesh won the 3-match series 3–0
Most runs	Mohammad Ashraful (77)	Gary Wilson (100)
Most wickets	Elias Sunny (8)	Paul Stirling (5)

All times are Western European Summer Time (UTC+1).

=== 1st Warm-up Match ===
16 July
11:30
Scorecard

Ireland XI; 103/6 (20 overs)	v	Bangladeshis; 107/3 (14.2 overs)
Nigel Jones 41* (26); Mashrafe Mortaza 3/14 (4 overs)		Mushfiqur Rahim 40 (25); Stuart Thompson 2/23 (3 overs)

Bangladeshis won by 7 wickets
The Green, Comber
Umpires: Alan Neill and Michael Ross

- Ireland XI won the toss and elected to bat.

=== 2nd Warm-up Match ===
16 July
16:00
Scorecard

Bangladeshis; 164/5 (20 overs)	v	NCU President's XI; 61/5 (13.2 overs)
Mohammad Ashraful 52* (49); Gary Kidd 2/43 (4 overs)		Andrew White 19* (23); Elias Sunny 2/7 (3 overs)

Bangladeshis won by 48 runs (D/L method)
The Green, Comber
Umpires: Alan Neill and Michael Ross

- Bangladeshis won the toss and elected to bat.
- Rain shortened the play to give NCU President's XI a target of 110 from 13.2 overs.

== T20I Series - Bangladesh v Ireland ==
=== 1st T20I ===
18 July
17:00
Scorecard

Bangladesh; 190/5 (20 overs)	v	Ireland; 119/8 (20 overs)
Shakib Al Hasan 57 (33); Paul Stirling 2/38 (4 overs)		Gary Wilson 41* (36); Elias Sunny 5/13 (4 overs)

Bangladesh won by 71 runs
Civil Service Cricket Club Ground, Belfast
Umpires: Mark Hawthorne and Richard Smith
Player of the match: Elias Sunny

- Ireland won the toss and elected to field.
- Two heavy showers (rain) delayed the start by 30 minutes. Match started at 17:30 with no loss of overs.
- T20I debuts: Abul Hasan, Elias Sunny and Ziaur Rahman (BAN). Elias Sunny became the first cricketer to win Man of the Match awards on debut in two formats. (Test and T20I) and became first Bangladeshi bowler to take 5 wickets haul in T20I debut.Abdur Razzak bowled a 5-ball over in 7th over and it was first time in international T20 cricket.

=== 2nd T20I ===
20 July
17:00
Scorecard

Bangladesh; 146/6 (20 overs)	v	Ireland; 145/6 (20 overs)
Nasir Hossain 50* (33); Max Sorensen 2/34 (4 overs)		Ed Joyce 41 (44); Elias Sunny 2/18 (4 overs)

Bangladesh won by 1 run.
Civil Service Cricket Club Ground, Belfast
Umpires: Mark Hawthorne and Richard Smith
Player of the match: Nasir Hossain

- Bangladesh won the toss and elected to bat.
- With this match Bangladesh gets a place in the ICC T20 rankings in 6th position.

=== 3rd T20I ===
21 July
16:00
Scorecard

Ireland; 140/8 (20 overs)	v	Bangladesh; 141/8 (20 overs)
William Porterfield 28 (22); Mashrafe Mortaza 4/19 (4 overs)		Tamim Iqbal 39 (37); Paul Stirling 3/21 (4 overs)

Bangladesh won by 2 wickets.
Civil Service Cricket Club Ground, Belfast
Umpires: Mark Hawthorne and Richard Smith
Player of the match: Mashrafe Mortaza

- Ireland won the toss and elected to bat.
- T20I debuts: Tim Murtagh. Bangladesh whitewashes a cricket team first time in T20 international cricket. Bangladesh jumps to 4th position in ICC T20 rankings.

== In Netherlands ==
Bangladeshi cricket team in Netherlands in 2012
	Bangladesh	Scotland
- Date: 24 July 2012
Captains	Mushfiqur Rahim	Gordon Drummond

Twenty20 International series

All times are Central European Summer Time (UTC+2).

== T20I Series - Bangladesh v Scotland ==
=== Only T20I ===
24 July
16:00
Scorecard

Bangladesh; 128/10	v	Scotland; 162/7
Shakib Al Hasan 31 (29); Josh Davey 3/23 (4 overs)		Richie Berrington 100 (58); Mashrafe Mortaza 2/22 (4 overs)

Scotland won by 34 runs
Sportpark Westvliet, The Hague
Umpires: Ian Ramage (Sco) and Richard Smith (Ire)

Bangladeshi cricket team in Netherlands in 2012
	Bangladesh	Netherlands
- Dates: 25 July 2012 – 26 July 2012
Captains	Mushfiqur Rahim	Peter Borren

Twenty20 International series

== T20I Series - Bangladesh v Netherlands ==
=== 1st T20I ===
25 July
16:00
Scorecard

Netherlands; 144/7	v	Bangladesh; 145/2
Michael Swart 57 (41); Mashrafe Mortaza 2/23 (4 overs)		Tamim Iqbal 69 (53); Timm van der Gugten 1/7 (1 over)

Bangladesh won by 8 wickets
Sportpark Westvliet, The Hague
Umpires: Ian Ramage (Sco) and Richard Smith (Ire)

- Netherlands won the toss and elected to bat

=== 2nd T20I ===
26 July
14:00
Scorecard

Netherlands; 131/9	v	Bangladesh; 128/10
Michael Swart 61 (49); Abdur Razzak 2/23 (4 overs)		Tamim Iqbal 50 (46); Timm van der Gugten 3/18 (4 overs)

Netherlands won by 1 wicket
Sportpark Westvliet, The Hague
Umpires: Ian Ramage (Sco) and Richard Smith (Ire)

- Bangladesh won the toss and elected to bat
