= Dutch cricket team in Scotland in 2014 =

Cricket tour

Netherlands cricket team in Scotland in 2014
	Scotland	Netherlands
- Dates: 1 July 2013 – 4 July 2013
Captains	Kyle Coetzer	Peter Borren, Michael Swart

One Day International series
- Results: 3-match series drawn 1–1
Most runs	Calum MacLeod (182)	Michael Swart (89)
Most wickets	Michael Leask (6)	Ahsan Malik (8)

The Netherlands national cricket team toured Scotland in July 2014 to play three limited overs matches. The tour followed both countries' participation in limited-overs competition in the North Sea Pro 20 and North Sea Pro 50 overs series in May–June 2014. The main aim for Scotland was finalising their squad for the 2015 World Cup.

== Squads ==
List A
Scotland	Netherlands
Kyle Coetzer (C); Preston Mommsen (VC); Richie Berrington; Freddie Coleman; Josh Davey; Alasdair Evans; Hamish Gardiner; Majid Haq; Michael Leask; Gavin Main; Calum MacLeod; Marc Petrie (WK); Safyaan Sharif; Iain Wardlaw; Matty Cross (wk)Withdrawn); Matt Machan (Withdrawn); Ruaidhri Smith (Withdrawn)	Michael Swart (c); Wesley Barresi (wk); Mudassar Bukhari; Ben Cooper; Vivian Kingma; Ahsan Malik; Paul van Meekeren; Stephan Myburgh; Mohammad Wasim; Michael Rippon; Thijs van Schelven; Pieter Seelaar; Eric Szwarczynski; Peter Borren (Withdrawn)

== Limited-overs series ==
=== 1st Match ===
1 July 2014
09:45 GMT
Scorecard

Scotland; 252/9 (50 overs)	v	Netherlands; 208 (45 Overs)
Michael Swart 62 (84); Iain Wardlaw 3/55 (10 Overs)		Hamish Gardiner 52 (68); Mudassar Bukhari 3/21 (9 Overs)

Netherlands won by 44 runs
Titwood, Glasgow
Umpires: Alex Dowdalls (SCO), Eric Young (SCO)

- Netherlands won the toss and elected to bat

=== 2nd Match ===
2 July 2014
09:45 GMT
Scorecard

Scotland; 317 (49.3 overs)	v	Netherlands; 115/7 (22.3)
Calum MacLeod 145 (124); Ahsan Malik 6/50 (10 overs)		Stephan Myburgh 27 (15); Michael Leask 4/19 (6 overs)

Scotland won by 144 runs (D/L method)
Titwood, Glasgow
Umpires: Alex Dowdalls (SCO), Eric Young (SCO)

- Netherlands won the toss and elected to field
- Rain stopped play: 115/7 off 22.3 overs of Netherlands innings

=== 3rd Match ===
4 July 2014
09:45 GMT
Scorecard

Scotland	v	Netherlands

Match abandoned without a ball bowled
Titwood, Glasgow
Umpires: Alex Dowdalls (SCO), Eric Young (SCO)

- No toss
- Series drawn
