= Dutch cricket team in Scotland in 2011 =

| | Netherlands | Scotland |
- Dates: 21 June – 29 June 2011
| Captains | Peter Borren | Gordon Drummond |

One Day International series
- Results: Scotland won the 2-match series 2–0
| Most runs | Tom Cooper (101) | Kyle Coetzer (153) |
| Most wickets | Tom Heggelman (5) | Majid Haq (4); Safyaan Sharif (4) |

The Netherlands toured Scotland from 21 June to 29 June 2011. The tour originally consisted of three Twenty20 Internationals (T20) and one ICC Intercontinental Cup match, but the Twenty20 Internationals were replaced by a pair of One Day Internationals (ODI).

== Intercontinental Cup ==
21–24 June
Scorecard

| Scotland | v | Netherlands |
| 309 (107 overs); Majid Haq 120* (292); Mudassar Bukhari 5/79 (26 overs) | | 306/8 (70 overs); Neil Kruger 91 (150); Preston Mommsen 3/67 (11 overs) |

Match drawn
Mannofield Park, Aberdeen
Umpires: Niels Bagh (Den) and Peter Nero (WI)

- Netherlands won the toss and elected to field.
- No play on Days 1 and 2 due to rain.
  Points: Scotland 7, Netherlands 7

== ODI series ==
=== 1st ODI ===
28 June
Scorecard

| Scotland; 255/7 (50 overs) | v | Netherlands; 240 (49 overs) |
| Kyle Coetzer 64 (92); Tom Heggelman 3/29 (6 overs) | | Tom Cooper 75 (103); Majid Haq 4/33 (10 overs) |

Scotland won by 15 runs
Mannofield Park, Aberdeen
Umpires: Niels Bagh (Den) and Peter Nero (WI)

- Scotland won the toss and elected to bat.

=== 2nd ODI ===
29 June
Scorecard

| Netherlands; 180/9 (50 overs) | v | Scotland; 162/5 (39.1 overs) |
| Peter Borren 71* (107); Safyaan Sharif 4/27 (8 overs) | | Kyle Coetzer 89* (99); Mudassar Bukhari 3/21 (9 overs) |

Scotland won by 5 wickets (D/L)
Mannofield Park, Aberdeen
Umpires: Niels Bagh (Den) and Peter Nero (WI)

- Scotland won the toss and elected to field.
- Rain stopped play after 17 overs in Scotland's innings, revising the target to 162 runs from 41 overs via the Duckworth–Lewis method.
