= Tri-nation series in Scotland in 2011 =

Tri-Nation Series in Scotland in 2011
- Part of the
- Date: 11–13 July 2011
- Location: Scotland
- Result: Sri Lanka won the Tri-series
Teams
Ireland	Scotland	Sri Lanka
Captains
William Porterfield	Gordon Drummond	Tillakaratne Dilshan
Most runs
Paul Stirling (113)	Kyle Coetzer (99)	Mahela Jayawardene (64)
Most wickets
George Dockrell (2)	Preston Mommsen (5)	Lasith Malinga (5)

The Tri-Nation Series in Scotland in 2011 was the One Day International cricket tournament in Scotland that was a tri-nation series between Ireland, Scotland and Sri Lanka.

== Squads ==
Squads
Ireland	Sri Lanka	Scotland
William Porterfield (c)	Tillakaratne Dilshan (c)	Gordon Drummond (c)
Alex Cusack	Thilina Kandamby (vc)	Richie Berrington
George Dockrell	Dinesh Chandimal	Kyle Coetzer
Trent Johnston	Dilhara Fernando	Josh Davey
Nigel Jones	Sanath Jayasuriya	Ryan Flannigan
Graeme McCarter	Mahela Jayawardene	Gordon Goudie
John Mooney	Suraj Randiv	Majid Haq
Kevin O'Brien	Dimuth Karunaratne	Neil McCallum
Niall O'Brien (wk)	Nuwan Kulasekara	Calum MacLeod
Andrew Poynter	Suranga Lakmal	Gregor Maiden (wk)
Boyd Rankin	Lasith Malinga	Preston Mommsen
Paul Stirling	Angelo Mathews	Fraser Watts
Andrew White	Ajantha Mendis	
Gary Wilson	Jeevan Mendis	
	Thisara Perera	
	Kumar Sangakkara (wk)	

== Group stage table ==
Pos	Team	Pld	W	L	T	NR	BP	Pts	NRR
1	Sri Lanka	2	1	0	0	1	1	7	3.660
2	Scotland	2	1	1	0	0	0	4	−1.735
3	Ireland	2	0	1	0	1	0	2	−0.260

Source: Source

== Group matches ==
11 July
Scorecard

Ireland	v	Sri Lanka

Match abandoned without a ball bowled
Grange Club Cricket Ground, Raeburn Place, Edinburgh
Umpires: Marais Erasmus (SA) and Ian Ramage (Sco)

- No toss
- Persistent rain forced the match to be abandoned.
- Points: Ireland 2, Sri Lanka 2

12 July
Scorecard

Ireland; 320/8 (50 overs)	v	Scotland; 323/5 (48.3 overs)
Paul Stirling 113 (95); Josh Davey 3/41 (7 overs)		Kyle Coetzer 89 (85); Richie Berrington 56 (23); George Dockrell 2/58 (10 overs)

Scotland won by 5 wickets
Grange Club Cricket Ground, Raeburn Place, Edinburgh
Umpires: Marais Erasmus (SA) and Ian Ramage (Sco)

- Scotland won the toss and elected to bowl.
- Points: Scotland 4, Ireland 0

13 July
Scorecard

Sri Lanka; 284/7 (50 overs)	v	Scotland; 101 (32.4 overs)
Mahela Jayawardene 64 (64); Preston Mommsen 2/19 (4 overs)		Majid Haq 34 (61); Lasith Malinga 5/30 (9.4 overs)

Sri Lanka won by 183 runs
The Grange, Raeburn Place, Edinburgh
Umpires: Marais Erasmus (SA) and Ian Ramage (Sco)

- Scotland won the toss and elected to bowl.
- Points: Sri Lanka 5, Scotland 0
