= 2014 World Twenty20 squads =

This is a list of the squads picked for the 2014 ICC World Twenty20.

== Squads ==
=== Afghanistan ===
Coach: (Pakistan) Kabir Khan

No.	Player	Date of birth	T20Is	Batting	Bowling style
7	Mohammad Nabi (c)	1 January 1985 (aged 29)	22	Right	Right-arm off break
44	Asghar Afghan	22 December 1987 (aged 26)	11	Right	Right-arm medium-fast
16	Dawlat Zadran	19 March 1988 (aged 25)	8	Right	Right-arm fast-medium
14	Gulbadin Naib	16 March 1991 (aged 23)	11	Right	Right-arm medium-fast
55	Aftab Alam	30 November 1992 (aged 21)	3	Right	Right-arm fast-medium
4	Hamza Hotak	15 August 1991 (aged 22)	8	Right	Slow left-arm orthodox
84	Karim Sadiq (wk)	5 January 1984 (aged 30)	21	Right	Right-arm off break
16	Mirwais Ashraf	30 June 1988 (aged 25)	16	Right	Right-arm fast-medium
77	Mohammad Shahzad (wk)	31 January 1988 (aged 26)	22	Right	–
52	Najib Taraki	2 February 1991 (aged 23)	0	Right	–
1	Najibullah Zadran	28 February 1993 (aged 21)	6	Left	Right-arm off break
48	Nawroz Mangal	15 July 1984 (aged 29)	22	Right	Right-arm off break
45	Samiullah Shenwari	3 February 1987 (aged 27)	22	Right	Right-arm leg break
28	Shafiqullah (wk)	7 August 1989 (aged 24)	9	Right	–
20	Shapoor Zadran	8 July 1987 (aged 26)	17	Left	Left-arm fast-medium

=== Bangladesh ===
Coach: (Australia) Shane Jurgensen

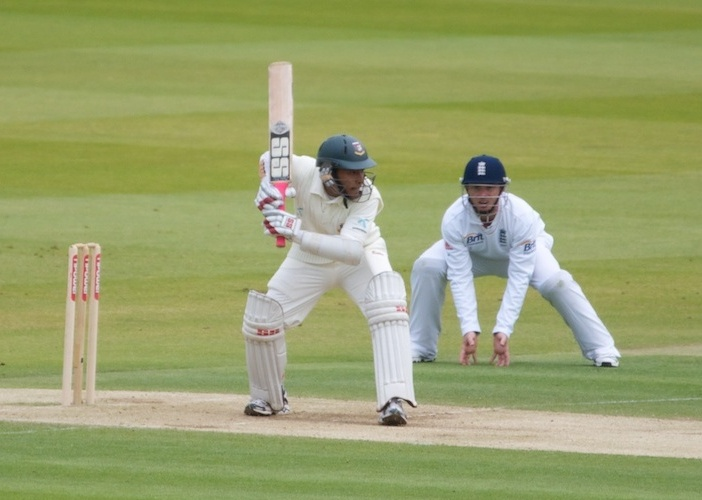
Mushfiqur Rahim (batting), Bangladesh's captain for the tournament.

No.	Player	Date of birth	T20Is	Batting	Bowling style	Twenty20 team
15	Mushfiqur Rahim (c & wk)	1 September 1988 (aged 25)	30	Right	–	(Bangladesh) Sylhet Royals
30	Mohammad Mahmudullah (vc)	4 February 1986 (aged 28)	26	Right	Right-arm off break	(Bangladesh) Chittagong Kings
41	Abdur Razzak	15 June 1982 (aged 31)	28	Left	Slow left-arm orthodox	(Bangladesh) Rangpur Riders
4	Al-Amin Hossain	1 January 1990 (aged 24)	1	Right	Right-arm medium-fast	(Bangladesh) Barisal Burners
66	Anamul Haque (wk)	16 December 1992 (aged 21)	3	Right	–	(Bangladesh) Dhaka Gladiators
76	Farhad Reza	16 June 1986 (aged 27)	10	Right	Right-arm fast-medium	(Bangladesh) Khulna Royal Bengals
2	Mashrafe Mortaza	5 October 1983 (aged 30)	23	Right	Right-arm fast-medium	(Bangladesh) Dhaka Gladiators
68	Mominul Haque	29 September 1991 (aged 22)	4	Left	Slow left-arm orthodox	(Bangladesh) Sylhet Royals
69	Nasir Hossain	30 November 1991 (aged 22)	17	Right	Right-arm off break	(Bangladesh) Rangpur Riders
34	Rubel Hossain	1 January 1990 (aged 24)	9	Right	Right-arm medium-fast	(Bangladesh) Chittagong Kings
1	Sabbir Rahman	20 August 1991 (aged 22)	1	Right	Right-arm leg break	(Bangladesh) Barisal Burners
63	Shamsur Rahman	5 June 1988 (aged 25)	6	Right	–	(Bangladesh) Rangpur Riders
75	Shakib Al Hasan	24 March 1987 (aged 26)	28	Left	Slow left-arm orthodox	(Bangladesh) Dhaka Gladiators
42	Sohag Gazi	5 August 1991 (aged 22)	6	Right	Right-arm off break	(Bangladesh) Sylhet Royals
28	Tamim Iqbal	20 March 1989 (aged 24)	28	Left	Right-arm off break	(Bangladesh) Duronto Rajshahi

=== Hong Kong ===
Coach: (Australia) Charlie Burke

No.	Player	Date of birth	T20Is	Batting	Bowling style
17	Jamie Atkinson (c & wk)	24 August 1990 (aged 23)	0	Right	–
73	Waqas Barkat (vc & wk)	17 February 1990 (aged 24)	0	Right	Right-arm bowler
11	Aizaz Khan	21 March 1993 (aged 20)	0	Right	Right-arm medium-fast
8	Mark Chapman	27 June 1994 (aged 19)	0	Left	Slow left-arm orthodox
5	Ehsan Nawaz	21 March 1995 (aged 18)	0	Right	Right-arm fast-medium
12	Haseeb Amjad	11 November 1987 (aged 26)	0	Right	Right-arm medium-fast
10	Babar Hayat	5 January 1992 (aged 22)	0	Right	Right-arm medium
7	Irfan Ahmed	27 February 1989 (aged 25)	0	Right	Right-arm fast-medium
–	Roy Lamsam	15 May 1980 (aged 33)	0	Right	Right-arm medium
78	Munir Dar	4 March 1972 (aged 42)	0	Right	Slow left-arm orthodox
18	Nadeem Ahmed	28 September 1987 (aged 26)	0	Right	Slow left-arm orthodox
–	Najeeb Amar	25 September 1971 (aged 42)	0	Left	Slow left-arm orthodox
75	Nizakat Khan	8 July 1992 (aged 21)	0	Right	Right-arm leg break
9	Kinchit Shah	9 December 1995 (aged 18)	0	Left	Right-arm off break
33	Tanwir Afzal	12 June 1988 (aged 25)	0	Right	Right-arm fast-medium

=== Nepal ===
Coach: (Sri Lanka) Pubudu Dassanayake

No.	Player	Date of birth	T20Is	Batting	Bowling style	Twenty20 team
77	Paras Khadka (c)	24 October 1987 (aged 26)	0	Right	Right-arm medium-fast, Right-arm off break	Cricket Association Nepal
11	Gyanendra Malla (vc)	16 September 1990 (aged 23)	0	Right	Right-arm offbreak	Cricket Association Nepal
24	Pradeep Airee	1 September 1992 (aged 21)	0	Right	Right-arm medium-fast	Cricket Association Nepal
14	Binod Bhandari (wk)	25 January 1990 (aged 24)	0	Right	Right-arm medium-fast, Right-arm off break	Cricket Association Nepal
5	Amrit Bhattarai	30 December 1990 (aged 23)	0	Right	Left-arm medium-fast	Cricket Association Nepal
56	Naresh Budhayer	15 October 1991 (aged 22)	0	Right	Right-arm offbreak	Cricket Association Nepal
44	Shakti Gauchan	22 April 1984 (aged 29)	0	Right	Slow left-arm orthodox	Cricket Association Nepal
9	Subash Khakurel (wk)	7 April 1993 (aged 20)	0	Right	Right-arm medium-fast	Cricket Association Nepal
1	Anil Mandal	5 January 1991 (aged 23)	0	Right	Right-arm offbreak	Cricket Association Nepal
65	Jitendra Mukhiya	22 November 1992 (aged 21)	0	Right	Right-arm medium-fast	Cricket Association Nepal
19	Basanta Regmi	6 April 1986 (aged 27)	0	Left	Slow left-arm orthodox	Cricket Association Nepal
7	Sagar Pun	1 March 1993 (aged 21)	0	Right	Right-arm off break	Cricket Association Nepal
62	Sompal Kami	2 February 1996 (aged 18)	0	Right	Right-arm fast-medium	Cricket Association Nepal
5	Sharad Vesawkar	6 October 1988 (aged 25)	0	Right	Right-arm off break	Cricket Association Nepal
10	Rahul Vishwakarma	19 October 1992 (aged 21)	0	Left	Slow left-arm orthodox	Cricket Association Nepal

=== Ireland ===
Coach: (Trinidad and Tobago) Phil Simmons

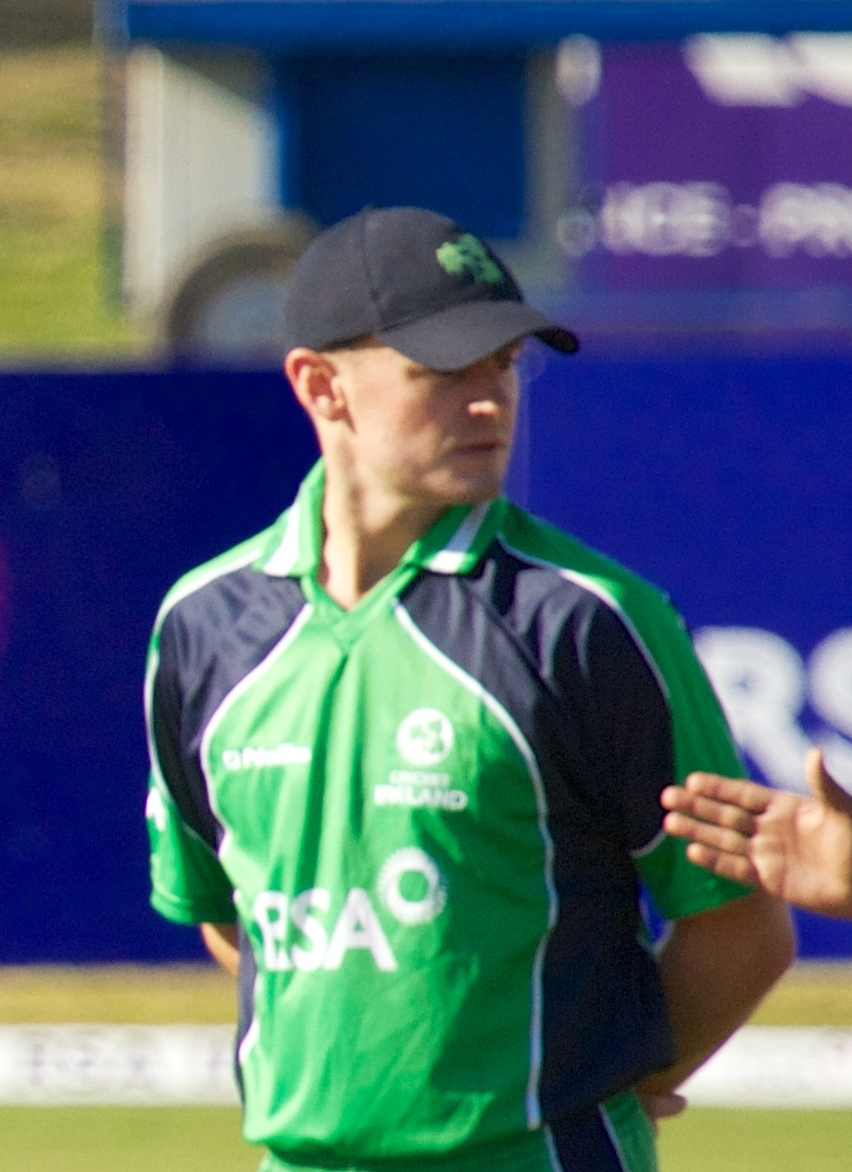
William Porterfield, Ireland's captain for the tournament.

No.	Player	Date of birth	T20Is	Batting	Bowling style	Twenty20 team
34	William Porterfield (c)	6 September 1984 (aged 29)	34	Left	Right-arm off break	(England) Birmingham Bears
22	Kevin O'Brien (vc)	4 March 1984 (aged 30)	34	Right	Right-arm medium-fast	(Ireland) Leinster Lightning
83	Alex Cusack	29 October 1980 (aged 33)	27	Right	Right-arm medium-fast	(Ireland) Leinster Lightning
50	George Dockrell	22 July 1992 (aged 21)	23	Right	Slow left-arm orthodox	(England) Somerset
24	Ed Joyce	22 September 1978 (aged 35)	13	Left	Right-arm medium	(England) Sussex Sharks
35	Andrew McBrine	30 April 1993 (aged 20)	0	Right	Right-arm off break	(Ireland) North West Warriors
34	Tim Murtagh	2 August 1981 (aged 32)	5	Left	Right-arm fast-medium	(England) Middlesex Panthers
72	Niall O'Brien (wk)	8 November 1981 (aged 32)	21	Left	–	(England) Leicestershire Foxes
25	Andrew Poynter	25 April 1987 (aged 26)	7	Right	Right-arm off break	(Ireland) Leinster Lightning
26	Max Sorensen	18 November 1985 (aged 28)	14	Right	Right-arm fast-medium	(Ireland) Leinster Lightning
77	James Shannon	12 February 1990 (aged 24)	1	Right	Right-arm off break	(Ireland) Northern Knights
1	Paul Stirling	3 September 1990 (aged 23)	23	Right	Right-arm off break	(England) Middlesex Panthers
17	Stuart Thompson	15 August 1991 (aged 22)	2	Left	Right-arm medium-fast	(Ireland) North West Warriors
14	Gary Wilson (wk)	5 February 1986 (aged 28)	31	Right	–	(England) Surrey
44	Craig Young	4 April 1990 (aged 23)	0	Right	Right-arm medium	(Ireland) North West Warriors

=== Netherlands ===
Coach: (South Africa) Anton Roux

No.	Player	Date of birth	T20Is	Batting	Bowling style	Twenty20 team
83	Peter Borren (c)	21 August 1983 (aged 30)	20	Right	Right-arm medium	(Netherlands) North Holland Hurricanes
34	Wesley Barresi (wk)	3 May 1984 (aged 29)	12	Right	Right-arm off break	(Netherlands) South Holland Seafarers
7	Mudassar Bukhari	26 December 1983 (aged 30)	20	Right	Right-arm medium-fast	(Netherlands) North Holland Hurricanes
32	Ben Cooper	10 February 1992 (aged 22)	4	Left	Right-arm medium	(Netherlands) North Holland Hurricanes
26	Tom Cooper	26 November 1986 (aged 27)	8	Right	Right-arm Off-break	(Australia) Melbourne Renegades
16	Tom Heggelman	16 January 1987 (aged 27)	0	Right	Right-arm medium	(Netherlands) South Holland Seafarers
17	Ahsan Malik	29 August 1989 (aged 24)	10	Right	Right-arm medium-fast	(Netherlands) South Holland Seafarers
23	Vivian Kingma	23 October 1994 (aged 19)	0	Right	Right-arm medium	(Netherlands) South Holland Seafarers
97	Stephan Myburgh	28 February 1984 (aged 30)	9	Left	Right-arm off break	(Netherlands) South Holland Seafarers
68	Michael Rippon	14 September 1991 (aged 22)	6	Right	Slow left-arm wrist-spin	(England) Sussex Sharks
8	Pieter Seelaar	2 July 1987 (aged 26)	19	Right	Slow left-arm orthodox	(Netherlands) South Holland Seafarers
25	Michael Swart	1 October 1982 (aged 31)	11	Right	Right-arm off break	Free Agent
13	Eric Szwarczynski	13 February 1983 (aged 31)	14	Right	Right-arm medium	Free Agent
90	Logan van Beek	7 September 1990 (aged 23)	0	Right	Right-arm medium-fast	(New Zealand) Canterbury Wizards
10	Timm van der Gugten	25 February 1991 (aged 23)	6	Right	Right-arm fast-medium	(Australia) Hobart Hurricanes

=== United Arab Emirates ===
Coach: (Pakistan) Aaqib Javed

No.	Player	Date of birth	T20Is	Batting	Bowling style
11	Khurram Khan (c)	21 June 1971 (aged 42)	0	Left	Slow left-arm orthodox
69	Ahmed Raza	10 October 1988 (aged 25)	0	Right	Slow left-arm orthodox
77	Amjad Ali (wk)	25 September 1979 (aged 34)	0	Left	Leg break
27	Amjad Javed	5 July 1980 (aged 33)	0	Right	Right-arm medium
66	Faizan Asif	21 December 1992 (aged 21)	0	Left	—
15	Manjula Guruge	14 February 1981 (aged 33)	0	Right	Left-arm fast-medium
06	Kamran Shahzad	15 April 1984 (aged 29)	0	Right	Right-arm medium
–	Moaaz Qazi	15 October 1995 (aged 18)	0	Right	Right-arm off break
10	Swapnil Patil (wk)	15 April 1985 (aged 28)	0	Right	—
80	Rohan Mustafa	7 October 1988 (aged 25)	0	Left	Right-arm slow
–	Rohit Singh	22 October 1993 (aged 20)	0	Right	Right-arm medium
50	Shaiman Anwar	15 March 1979 (aged 35)	0	Right	Right-arm medium-fast
–	Sharif Asadullah	14 December 1984 (aged 29)	0	Right	Right-arm fast-medium
–	Vikrant Shetty	17 October 1983 (aged 30)	0	Right	Right-arm off break
78	Shadeep Silva	18 August 1978 (aged 35)	0	Left	Slow left-arm orthodox

=== Zimbabwe ===
Coach: (Zimbabwe) Andy Waller

No.	Player	Date of birth	T20Is	Batting	Bowling style	Twenty20 team
1	Brendan Taylor (c & wk)	6 February 1986 (aged 28)	23	Right	Right-arm off break	(Zimbabwe) Mid West Rhinos
13	Tendai Chatara	28 February 1991 (aged 23)	4	Right	Right-arm fast-medium	(Zimbabwe) Mountaineers
47	Elton Chigumbura	14 March 1986 (aged 28)	24	Right	Right-arm fast-medium	(Zimbabwe) Mashonaland Eagles
98	Tafadzwa Kamungozi	8 June 1987 (aged 26)	0	Right	Right-arm leg break	(Zimbabwe) Southern Rocks
65	Timycen Maruma	19 April 1988 (aged 25)	6	Right	Right-arm leg break	(Zimbabwe) Mountaineers
3	Hamilton Masakadza	9 August 1983 (aged 30)	28	Right	Right-arm medium	(Zimbabwe) Mountaineers
86	Shingi Masakadza	4 September 1986 (aged 27)	7	Right	Right-arm fast-medium	(Zimbabwe) Mountaineers
91	Natsai Mushangwe	9 February 1991 (aged 23)	3	Right	Right-arm leg break	(Zimbabwe) Mountaineers
48	Tinashe Panyangara	21 October 1985 (aged 28)	3	Right	Right-arm fast-medium	(Zimbabwe) Southern Rocks
24	Sikandar Raza	24 April 1986 (aged 27)	2	Right	Right-arm medium	(Zimbabwe) Mashonaland Eagles
10	Vusi Sibanda	10 October 1983 (aged 30)	13	Right	Right-arm medium	(Zimbabwe) Mid West Rhinos
52	Prosper Utseya	26 March 1985 (aged 28)	26	Right	Right-arm off break	(Zimbabwe) Mountaineers
60	Brian Vitori	22 February 1990 (aged 24)	6	Left	Left-arm fast-medium	(Zimbabwe) Mashonaland Eagles
9	Malcolm Waller	28 September 1984 (aged 29)	11	Right	Right-arm off break	(Zimbabwe) Mid West Rhinos
14	Sean Williams	26 September 1986 (aged 27)	5	Left	Slow left-arm orthodox	(Zimbabwe) Matabeleland Tuskers

=== England ===
Coach: (England) Ashley Giles

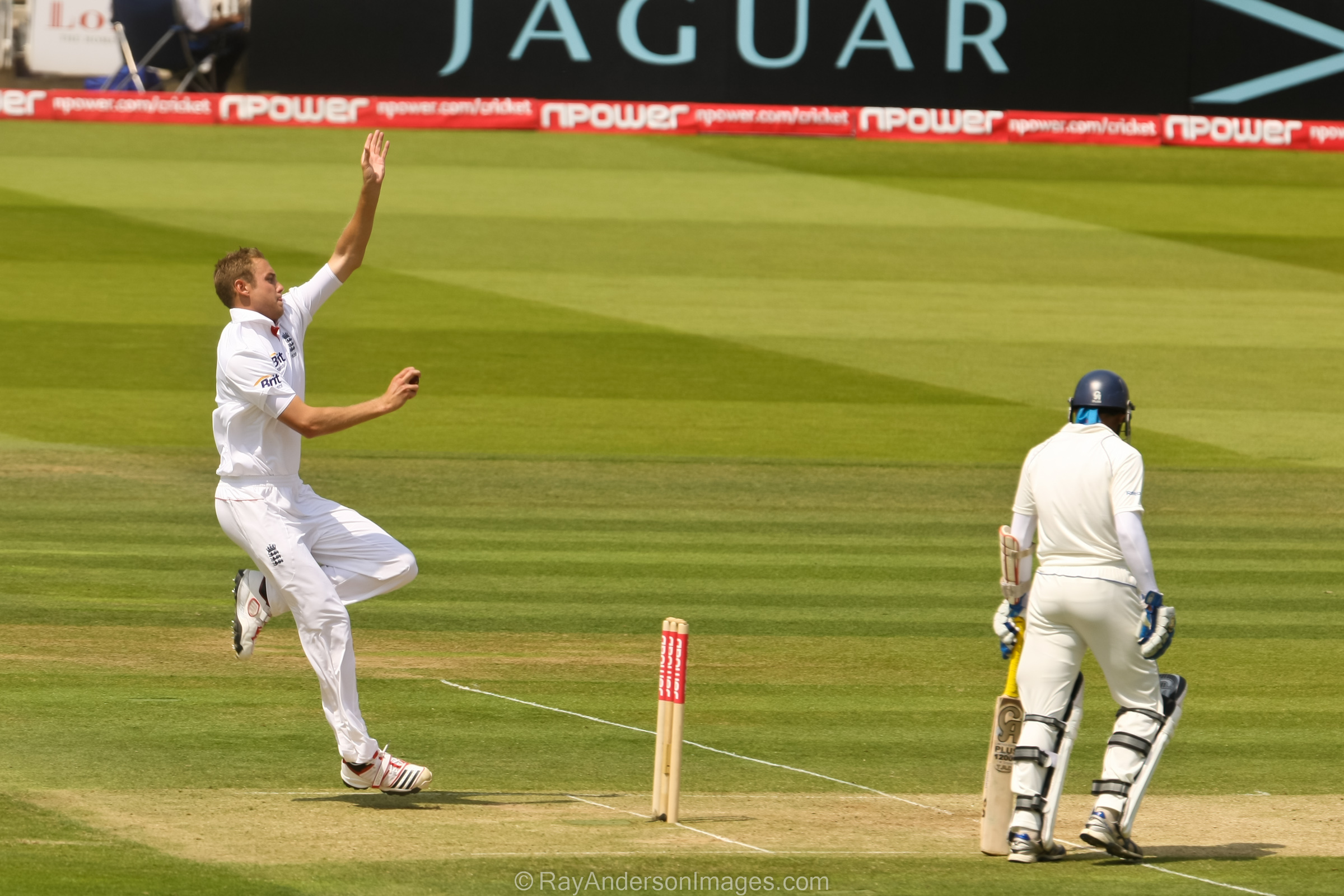
Stuart Broad (bowling), England's captain for the tournament.

No.	Player	Date of birth	T20Is	Batting	Bowling style	Twenty20 team
8	Stuart Broad (c)	24 June 1986 (aged 27)	52	Left	Right-arm fast-medium	(England) Nottinghamshire Outlaws
16	Eoin Morgan (vc)	10 September 1986 (aged 27)	44	Left	Right-arm medium	(England) Middlesex Panthers
57	Moeen Ali	18 June 1987 (aged 26)	2	Left	Right-arm off break	(England) Worcestershire
7	Ian Bell	11 April 1982 (aged 31)	7	Right	Right-arm medium	(England) Birmingham Bears
42	Ravi Bopara	4 May 1985 (aged 28)	32	Right	Right-arm medium	(England) Essex Eagles
20	Tim Bresnan	28 February 1985 (aged 29)	30	Right	Right-arm medium-fast	(England) Yorkshire Vikings
63	Jos Buttler (wk)	8 September 1990 (aged 23)	31	Right	–	(England) Lancashire Lightning
46	Jade Dernbach	3 April 1986 (aged 27)	31	Right	Right-arm fast-medium	(England) Surrey
35	Alex Hales	3 January 1989 (aged 25)	27	Right	Right-arm medium	(England) Nottinghamshire Outlaws
34	Chris Jordan	4 October 1988 (aged 25)	2	Right	Right-arm fast-medium	(England) Sussex Sharks
22	Craig Kieswetter (wk)	28 November 1987 (aged 26)	25	Right	Right-arm off break	(England) Somerset
45	Michael Lumb	12 February 1980 (aged 34)	23	Left	Right-arm medium	(England) Nottinghamshire Outlaws
73	Stephen Parry	12 January 1986 (aged 28)	2	Right	Slow left-arm orthodox	(England) Lancashire Lightning
53	James Tredwell	27 February 1982 (aged 32)	11	Left	Right-arm off break	(England) Kent Spitfires
19	Chris Woakes	2 March 1989 (aged 25)	4	Right	Right-arm fast-medium	(England) Birmingham Bears

=== New Zealand ===
Coach: (New Zealand) Mike Hesson

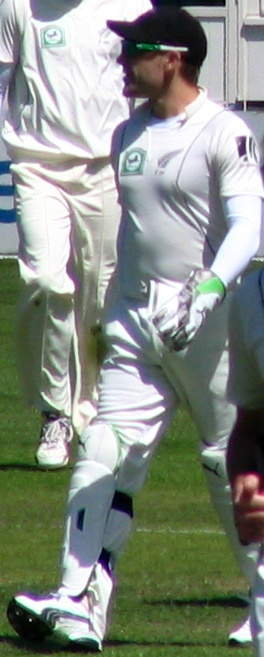
Brendon McCullum.

No.	Player	Date of birth	T20Is	Batting	Bowling style	Twenty20 team
42	Brendon McCullum (C)	27 September 1981 (aged 32)	64	Right	Right-arm medium	(New Zealand) Otago Volts
78	Corey Anderson	13 December 1990 (aged 23)	8	Left	Left-arm medium-fast	(New Zealand) Northern Districts Knights
8	Trent Boult	22 July 1989 (aged 24)	3	Right	Left-arm medium-fast	(New Zealand) Northern Districts Knights
84	Anton Devcich	28 September 1985 (aged 28)	2	Left	Slow left-arm orthodox	(New Zealand) Northern Districts Knights
31	Martin Guptill	30 September 1986 (aged 27)	43	Right	Right-arm off break	(New Zealand) Auckland Aces
36	Ronnie Hira	23 January 1987 (aged 27)	15	Left	Slow left-arm orthodox	(New Zealand) Canterbury Wizards
81	Mitchell McClenaghan	11 June 1986 (aged 27)	11	Left	Left-arm medium-fast	(New Zealand) Auckland Aces
15	Nathan McCullum	1 September 1980 (aged 33)	51	Right	Right-arm off break	(New Zealand) Otago Volts
37	Kyle Mills	15 March 1979 (aged 35)	37	Right	Right-arm medium-fast	(New Zealand) Auckland Aces
82	Colin Munro	11 March 1987 (aged 27)	12	Left	Right-arm medium-fast	(New Zealand) Auckland Aces
83	James Neesham	17 September 1990 (aged 23)	5	Left	Right-arm medium	(New Zealand) Otago Volts
54	Luke Ronchi (wk)	23 April 1981 (aged 32)	12	Right	–	(New Zealand) Wellington Firebirds
38	Tim Southee	11 December 1988 (aged 25)	33	Right	Right-arm medium-fast	(New Zealand) Northern Districts Knights
3	Ross Taylor	8 March 1984 (aged 30)	55	Right	Right-arm off break	(New Zealand) Central Districts Stags
22	Kane Williamson	8 August 1990 (aged 23)	13	Right	Right-arm off break	(New Zealand) Northern Districts Knights

=== South Africa ===
Coach: (South Africa) Russell Domingo

No.	Player	Date of birth	T20Is	Batting	Bowling style	Twenty20 team
18	Faf du Plessis (c)	14 April 1984 (aged 29)	17	Right	Leg break	(South Africa) Titans
1	Hashim Amla	31 March 1983 (aged 30)	21	Right	Right-arm medium	(South Africa) Dolphins
28	Farhaan Behardien	17 February 1984 (aged 30)	11	Right	Right-arm fast-medium	(South Africa) Titans
12	Quinton de Kock (wk)	17 December 1992 (aged 21)	12	Left	–	(South Africa) Lions
17	AB de Villiers (wk)	2 May 1982 (aged 31)	52	Right	Right-arm medium	(South Africa) Titans
21	JP Duminy	13 July 1984 (aged 29)	50	Right	Right-arm off break	(South Africa) Cape Cobras
14	Beuran Hendricks	7 August 1990 (aged 23)	2	Right	Left-arm fast-medium	(South Africa) Cape Cobras
99	Imran Tahir	27 March 1979 (aged 34)	7	Right	Leg break googly	(South Africa) Lions
10	David Miller	6 October 1989 (aged 24)	21	Left	Right-arm off break	(South Africa) Dolphins
81	Albie Morkel	10 June 1981 (aged 32)	44	Left	Right-arm medium-fast	(South Africa) Titans
65	Morné Morkel	6 October 1984 (aged 29)	36	Left	Right-arm fast	(South Africa) Titans
7	Wayne Parnell	30 July 1989 (aged 24)	26	Left	Left-arm medium-fast	(South Africa) Warriors
69	Aaron Phangiso	21 January 1984 (aged 30)	3	Right	Slow left-arm orthodox	(South Africa) Lions
8	Dale Steyn	27 June 1983 (aged 30)	33	Right	Right-arm fast	(South Africa) Cape Cobras
68	Lonwabo Tsotsobe	7 March 1984 (aged 30)	20	Right	Left-arm fast-medium	(South Africa) Warriors

=== Sri Lanka ===
Coach: (England) Paul Farbrace

No.	Player	Date of birth	T20Is	Batting	Bowling style	Twenty20 team
36	Dinesh Chandimal ( wk )	18 November 1989 (aged 24)	23	Right	Right-arm off break	(Sri Lanka) Wayamba United
99	Lasith Malinga (c)	28 August 1983 (aged 30)	50	Right	Right-arm fast	(Sri Lanka) Ruhuna Royals
23	Tillakaratne Dilshan	14 October 1976 (aged 37)	55	Right	Right-arm off break	(Sri Lanka) Basnahira Cricket Dundee
14	Rangana Herath	19 March 1978 (aged 35)	6	Left	Slow left-arm orthodox	(Sri Lanka) Basnahira Cricket Dundee
27	Mahela Jayawardene	27 May 1977 (aged 36)	49	Right	Right-arm medium	(Sri Lanka) Wayamba United
92	Nuwan Kulasekara	22 July 1982 (aged 31)	34	Right	Right-arm fast-medium	(Sri Lanka) Nagenahira Nagas
82	Suranga Lakmal	10 March 1987 (aged 27)	3	Right	Right-arm medium-fast	(Sri Lanka) Basnahira Cricket Dundee
69	Angelo Mathews	2 June 1987 (aged 26)	47	Right	Right-arm fast-medium	(Sri Lanka) Nagenahira Nagas
40	Ajantha Mendis	11 March 1985 (aged 29)	36	Right	Right-arm off break, Leg break	(Sri Lanka) Nagenahira Nagas
8	Kusal Perera (wk)	17 August 1990 (aged 23)	11	Left	–	(Sri Lanka) Wayamba United
1	Thisara Perera	3 April 1989 (aged 24)	32	Left	Right-arm medium-fast	(Sri Lanka) Kandurata Warriors
41	Seekkuge Prasanna	27 June 1985 (aged 28)	2	Right	Leg break	(Sri Lanka) Uva Next
11	Kumar Sangakkara (wk)	27 October 1977 (aged 36)	50	Left	Right-arm off break	(Sri Lanka) Kandurata Warriors
18	Sachithra Senanayake	9 February 1985 (aged 29)	10	Right	Right-arm off break	(Sri Lanka) Uva Next
66	Lahiru Thirimanne	8 September 1989 (aged 24)	18	Left	Right-arm medium-fast	(Sri Lanka) Ruhuna Royals

=== Australia ===
Coach: (Australia) Darren Lehmann

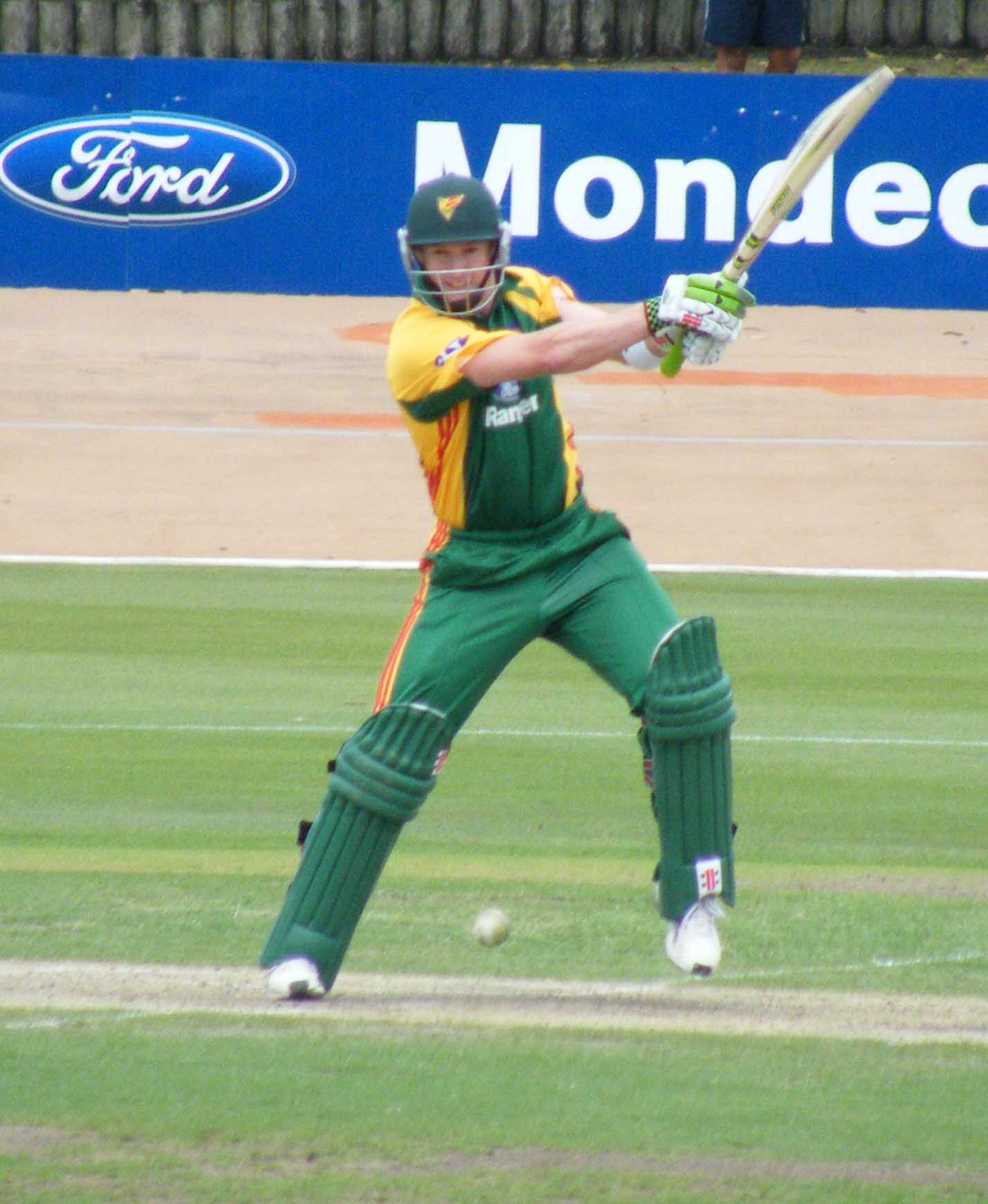
George Bailey, Australia's captain for the tournament.

No.	Player	Date of birth	T20Is	Batting	Bowling style	Twenty20 team
2	George Bailey (c)	7 September 1982 (aged 31)	24	Right	Right-arm medium	(Australia) Hobart Hurricanes
4	Doug Bollinger	24 July 1981 (aged 32)	2	Left	Left-arm fast-medium	(Australia) Hobart Hurricanes
54	Daniel Christian	4 May 1983 (aged 30)	14	Right	Right-arm fast-medium	(Australia) Brisbane Heat
6	Nathan Coulter-Nile	11 October 1987 (aged 26)	8	Right	Right-arm fast	(Australia) Perth Scorchers
44	James Faulkner	29 April 1990 (aged 23)	6	Right	Left-arm fast-medium	(Australia) Melbourne Stars
4	Aaron Finch	17 November 1986 (aged 27)	14	Right	Left-arm medium	(Australia) Melbourne Renegades
57	Brad Haddin (wk)	23 October 1977 (aged 36)	29	Right	–	(Australia) Sydney Sixers
17	Brad Hodge	29 December 1974 (aged 39)	12	Right	Right-arm off break	(Australia) Melbourne Stars
71	Brad Hogg	6 February 1971 (aged 43)	14	Left	Slow left-arm wrist-spin	(Australia) Perth Scorchers
28	Glenn Maxwell	14 October 1988 (aged 25)	17	Right	Right-arm off break	(Australia) Melbourne Stars
18	James Muirhead	30 July 1993 (aged 20)	3	Right	Legbreak	(Australia) Melbourne Stars
56	Mitchell Starc	30 January 1990 (aged 24)	14	Left	Left-arm fast-medium	(Australia) Sydney Sixers
31	David Warner	27 October 1986 (aged 27)	47	Left	Leg break	(Australia) Sydney Thunder
33	Shane Watson	17 June 1981 (aged 32)	41	Right	Right-arm fast-medium	(Australia) Brisbane Heat
7	Cameron White	18 August 1983 (aged 30)	42	Right	Legbreak googly	(Australia) Melbourne Stars

=== India ===
Coach: (Zimbabwe) Duncan Fletcher

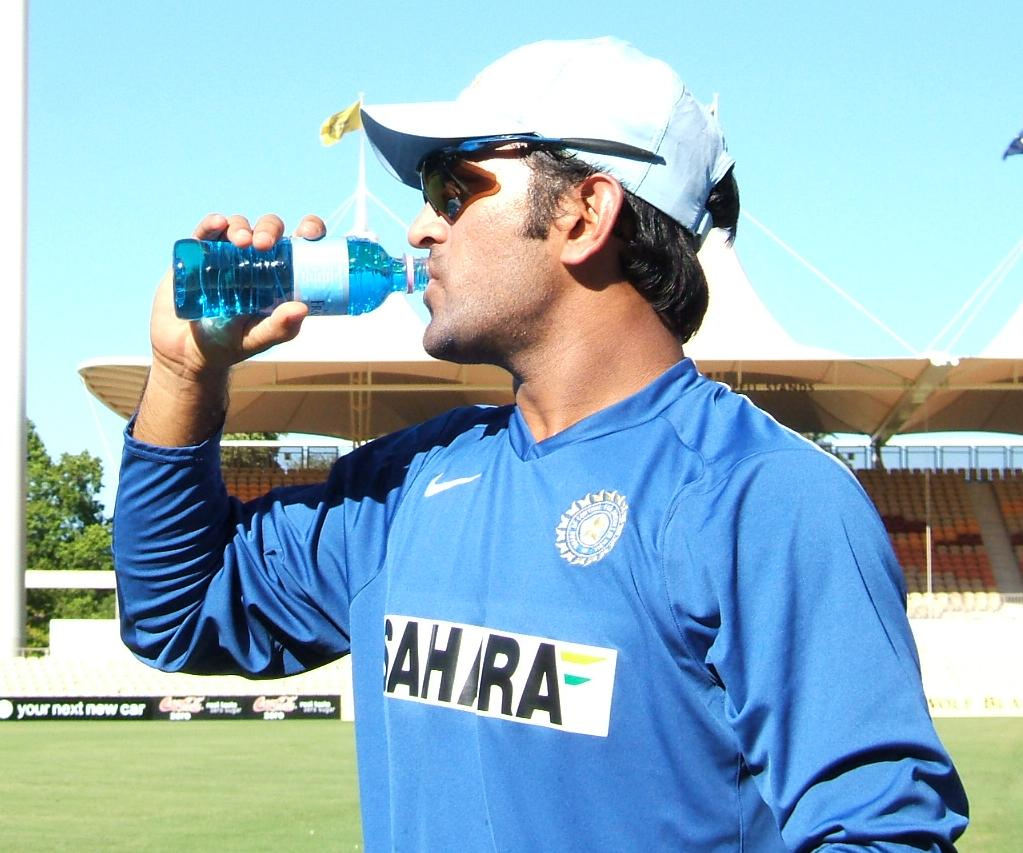
MS Dhoni, India's captain for the tournament.

No.	Player	Date of birth	T20Is	Batting	Bowling style	IPL team
7	MS Dhoni (c & wk)	7 July 1981 (aged 32)	43	Right	Right-arm medium	(India) Chennai Super Kings
18	Virat Kohli (vc)	5 November 1988 (aged 25)	21	Right	Right-arm medium	(India) Royal Challengers Bangalore
77	Varun Aaron	29 October 1989 (aged 24)	0	Right	Right-arm fast	(India) Royal Challengers Bangalore
99	Ravichandran Ashwin	17 September 1986 (aged 27)	19	Right	Right-arm off break	(India) Chennai Super Kings
84	Stuart Binny	3 June 1984 (aged 29)	0	Right	Right-arm medium	(India) Rajasthan Royals
25	Shikhar Dhawan	5 December 1985 (aged 28)	2	Left	Right-arm off break	(India) Sunrisers Hyderabad
8	Ravindra Jadeja	6 December 1988 (aged 25)	15	Left	Slow left-arm orthodox	(India) Chennai Super Kings
15	Bhuvneshwar Kumar	5 February 1990 (aged 24)	3	Right	Right-arm medium-fast	(India) Sunrisers Hyderabad
9	Amit Mishra	24 November 1982 (aged 31)	1	Right	Right-arm leg break	(India) Sunrisers Hyderabad
11	Mohammed Shami	9 March 1990 (aged 24)	3	Right	Right-arm fast	(India) Delhi Daredevils
17	Ajinkya Rahane	5 June 1988 (aged 25)	7	Right	Right-arm medium	(India) Rajasthan Royals
3	Suresh Raina	27 November 1986 (aged 27)	37	Left	Right-arm off break	(India) Chennai Super Kings
6	Mohit Sharma	18 September 1988 (aged 25)	1	Right	Right-arm medium-fast	(India) Chennai Super Kings
45	Rohit Sharma	30 April 1987 (aged 26)	36	Right	Right-arm off break	(India) Mumbai Indians
12	Yuvraj Singh	12 December 1981 (aged 32)	34	Left	Slow left-arm orthodox	(India) Royal Challengers Bangalore

=== Pakistan ===
Coach: (Pakistan) Moin Khan

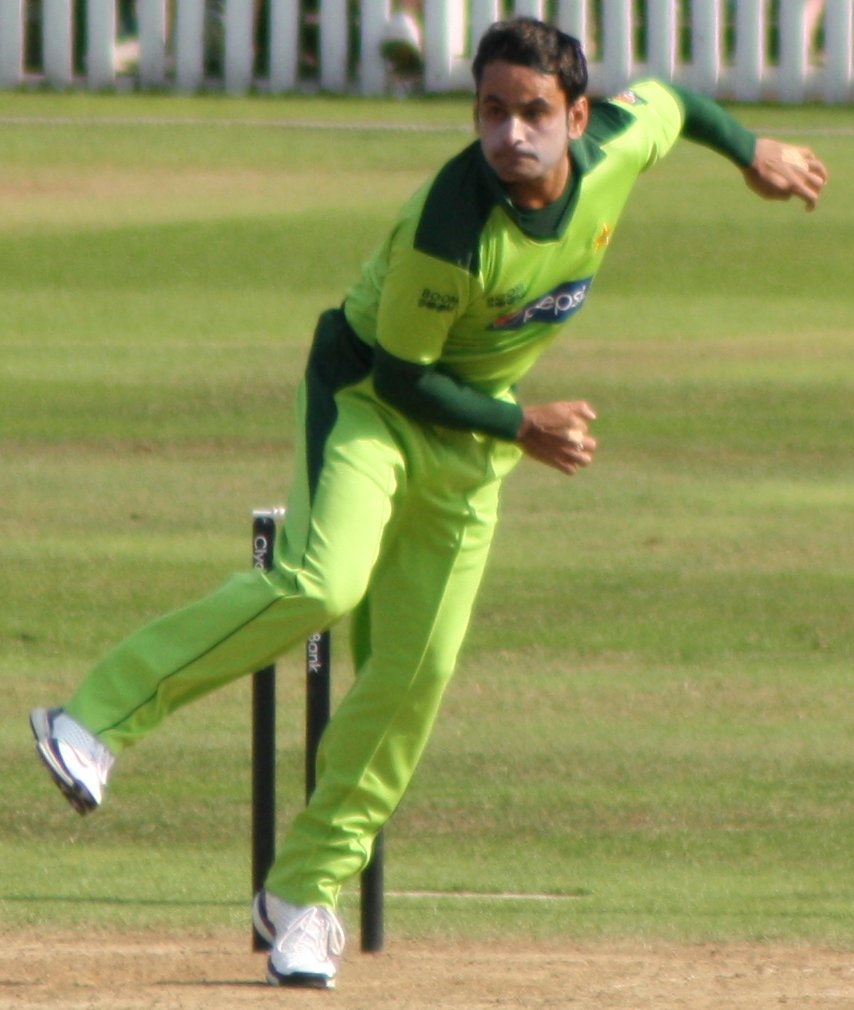
Mohammad Hafeez, Pakistan's captain for the tournament.

No.	Player	Date of birth	T20Is	Batting	Bowling style	Twenty20 team
8	Mohammad Hafeez (c)	17 October 1980 (aged 33)	54	Right	Right-arm off break	(Pakistan) Lahore Lions
19	Ahmed Shehzad	23 November 1991 (aged 22)	22	Right	Leg break	(Pakistan) Lahore Lions
80	Bilawal Bhatti	17 September 1991 (aged 22)	5	Right	Right-arm medium-fast	(Pakistan) Sialkot Stallions
83	Junaid Khan	24 December 1989 (aged 24)	8	Right	Left-arm fast	(Pakistan) Abbottabad Falcons
23	Kamran Akmal (wk)	13 January 1982 (aged 32)	50	Right	–	(Pakistan) Lahore Eagles
99	Mohammad Talha	15 October 1988 (aged 25)	0	Right	Right-arm medium-fast	(Pakistan) Faisalabad Wolves
50	Saeed Ajmal	14 October 1977 (aged 36)	59	Right	Right-arm off break	(Pakistan) Faisalabad Wolves
10	Shahid Afridi	1 March 1980 (aged 34)	70	Right	Leg break googly	(Pakistan) Karachi Dolphins
98	Sharjeel Khan	14 August 1989 (aged 24)	3	Left	Leg break	(Pakistan) Hyderabad Hawks
6	Shoaib Malik	1 February 1982 (aged 32)	55	Right	Right-arm off break	(Pakistan) Sialkot Stallions
92	Sohaib Maqsood	15 April 1987 (aged 26)	9	Right	Right-arm off break	(Pakistan) Multan Tigers
33	Sohail Tanvir	12 December 1984 (aged 29)	38	Left	Left-arm medium-fast	(Pakistan) Rawalpindi Rams
96	Umar Akmal	26 May 1990 (aged 23)	52	Right	–	(Pakistan) Lahore Lions
55	Umar Gul	14 April 1984 (aged 29)	52	Right	Right-arm fast-medium	(Pakistan) Islamabad Leopards
78	Zulfiqar Babar	10 December 1978 (aged 35)	4	Right	Slow left-arm orthodox	(Pakistan) Multan Tigers

=== West Indies ===
Coach: (Barbados) Ottis Gibson

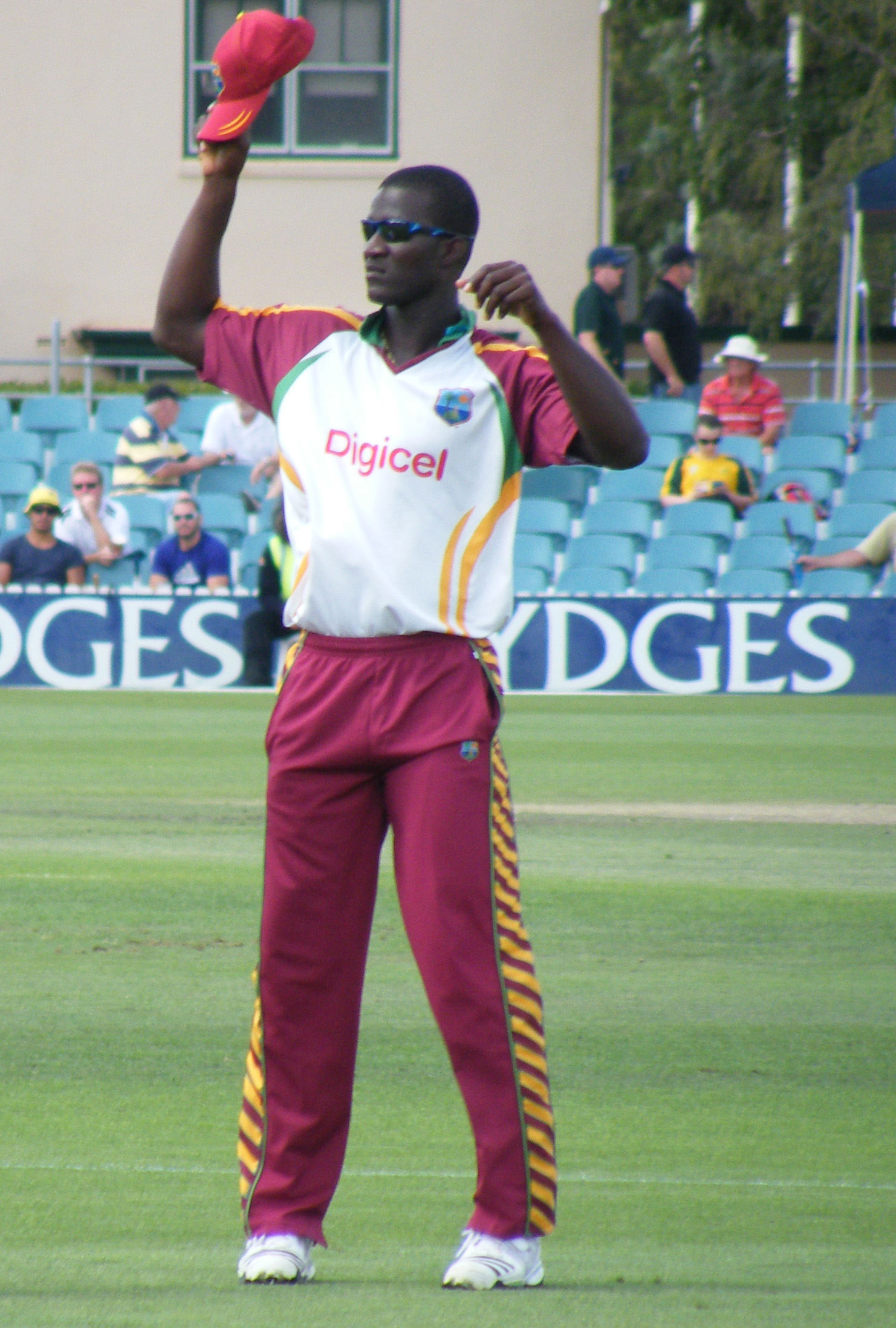
Darren Sammy, West Indies captain for the tournament.

No.	Player	Date of birth	T20Is	Batting	Bowling style	Twenty20 team
88	Darren Sammy (c)	20 December 1983 (aged 30)	47	Right	Right-arm medium-fast	(Saint Lucia) St Lucia Zouks
77	Samuel Badree	9 March 1981 (aged 33)	15	Right	Leg break	(Trinidad and Tobago) Trinidad & Tobago Red Steel
47	Dwayne Bravo	7 October 1983 (aged 30)	44	Right	Right-arm medium-fast	(Trinidad and Tobago) Trinidad & Tobago Red Steel
25	Johnson Charles (wk)	14 January 1989 (aged 25)	21	Right	–	(Antigua and Barbuda) Antigua Hawksbills
19	Sheldon Cottrell	19 August 1989 (aged 24)	1	Right	Left-arm fast-medium	(Antigua and Barbuda) Antigua Hawksbills
72	Andre Fletcher (wk)	27 November 1987 (aged 26)	19	Right	Right-arm medium-fast	(Saint Lucia) St Lucia Zouks
45	Chris Gayle	21 September 1979 (aged 34)	37	Left	Right-arm off break	Jamaica Tallawahs
74	Sunil Narine	26 May 1988 (aged 25)	24	Left	Right-arm off break	Guyana Amazon Warriors
80	Dinesh Ramdin (wk)	13 March 1985 (aged 29)	41	Right	–	Guyana Amazon Warriors
14	Ravi Rampaul	15 October 1984 (aged 29)	22	Left	Right-arm fast-medium	Jamaica Tallawahs
12	Andre Russell	29 April 1988 (aged 25)	22	Right	Right-arm fast	Jamaica Tallawahs
7	Marlon Samuels	5 January 1981 (aged 33)	30	Right	Right-arm off break	(Antigua and Barbuda) Antigua Hawksbills
67	Krishmar Santokie	20 December 1984 (aged 29)	5	Left	Left-arm medium-fast	Guyana Amazon Warriors
54	Lendl Simmons	25 January 1985 (aged 29)	25	Right	Right-arm medium-fast	(Trinidad and Tobago) Trinidad & Tobago Red Steel
50	Dwayne Smith	12 April 1983 (aged 30)	22	Right	Right-arm medium-fast	Barbados Tridents

== Changes ==
English batsman Joe Root broke his right thumb in the third ODI against the West Indies and was ruled out of the tournament, being replaced by Ian Bell. English all-rounder Ben Stokes damaged his hand by punching a locker in the dressing room after he was dismissed in the third T20I against the West Indies. He was replaced by Chris Woakes. Australian bowler Mitchell Johnson missed the tournament with an infection in his toe. He was replaced by Doug Bollinger.

Nepalese all-rounder Prithu Baskota was suffering from a knee injury, which he picked up during the 2014 World Cup Qualifier in New Zealand and was replaced by his teammate Amrit Bhattarai. On 16 March, Avinash Karn was replaced by Anil Mandal after Karn suffered an injury to his right knee and, therefore, was ruled out of the tournament.

On 16 March, Dutch batsman Tim Gruijters was replaced by Tom Cooper—previously unavailable for the tournament due to domestic commitments with Australian state side South Australia—with the Dutch coaching staff stating that Gruijters was injured. However, Gruijters denied that he was injured and alleged that the "coaching staff decided to bend the rules, act against the spirit of cricket and basically cheat". However, the ICC confirmed that they were satisfied that the KNCB had complied with the rules of the tournament.

On 22 March, English all-rounder Luke Wright was ruled out of the tournament due to a side-strain. He was replaced by Craig Kieswetter.

== See also ==
- 2014 ICC Women's World Twenty20 squads
