= Gruijters =

Gruijters or De Gruijter is a Dutch-language occupational surname. A gruijter or gruiter is an archaic name for someone hulling grains to produce groats or for one using these for brewing. Like most Dutch names with an "ij" digraph, the name is often spelled with a "y". People with this surname include:

- Elisabeth Gruyters (1789–1864), Dutch nun and founder of a congregation
- Hans Gruijters (1925–1980), Dutch bank robber and murderer
- Hans Gruijters (1931–2005), Dutch politician, co-founder of D66
- James Gruijters (born 1993), Dutch cricketer
- Pieter Gruijters (born 1968), Dutch Paralympian
- Tim Gruijters (born 1991), Dutch cricketer

De Gruijter

- Jochem de Gruijter (born 1978), Dutch volleyball player
- Walter de Gruyter (1862–1923), German merchant and publisher
