= Gorter =

Gorter or De Gorter is a Dutch-language occupational surname for a person growing barley. Notable people with the surname include:

- Arnold Marc Gorter (1866–1933), Dutch landscape painter
- Cornelis Jacobus Gorter (1907–1980), Dutch physicist
- David de Gorter (1717–1783), Dutch physician and botanist
- Donny Gorter (born 1988), Dutch soccer player, son of Edwin
- Edwin Gorter (born 1963), Dutch soccer player, father of Donny
- Hendrikus Jacobus Gorter (1874–1918), Dutch cyclist, speed skater and ice skates manufacturer from Zwolle
- Herman Gorter (1864–1927), Dutch poet and council communist theoretician
- Jay Gorter (born 2000), Dutch footballer
- Olaf Gorter (born 2005), Dutch footballer
- Johannes de Gorter (1689–1762), Dutch physician and father of David de Gorter
- Theo Gorter (born 1956), Dutch tennis player

== See also ==
- Gruijters, Dutch surname with the same origin
