= Ramesh Mepani =

Kenyan cricketer

Personal information
- Full name: Ramesh Premji Mepani
- Born: 26 September 1975 (age 51); Bhuj, Gujarat, India
- Batting: Right-handed
- Bowling: Right-arm medium

Career statistics
Competition	FC	LA	T20
Matches	1	2	5
Runs scored	45	28	31
Batting average	22.50	14.00	7.75
100s/50s	–/–	–/–	–/–
Top score	37	22	12
Balls bowled	24	48	0
Wickets	0	0	–
Bowling average	–	–	–
5 wickets in innings	–	–	–
10 wickets in match	–	–	–
Best bowling	–	–	–
Catches/stumpings	2/–	2/–	4/–
- Source: Cricinfo, 21 September 2021

Ramesh Premji Mepani (born 26 December 1975) is an Indian-born Kenyan former cricketer.

Mepani was born at Bhuj in the Indian state of Gujarat in June 1975. He emigrated to Kenya and later made a single appearance in first-class cricket for Kenya against the United Arab Emirates in the 2011–2013 ICC Intercontinental Cup at Nairobi in July 2011. Batting twice in the match, he was dismissed for 8 runs in the Kenyan first innings by Amjad Javed, while in their second innings he was run out by Saqib Ali. Prior to this match, he made what two appearances in List A cricket against the same opposition, scoring 28 runs with a highest score of 22. In November 2011, he toured Namibia and played in five Twenty20 matches against the Namibia national cricket team at Windhoek, scoring 31 runs with a highest score of 12.
