= Stuart Chalmers =

Scottish cricketer (born 1982)

Personal information
- Born: 18 November 1982 (age 43); Edinburgh, Scotland
- Batting: Right-handed

Domestic team information
- Years: Team
- Scotland
- Source: Cricinfo, 8 September 2014

Stuart Chalmers (born 18 November 1982) is a Scottish cricketer. He made his One Day International debut against Canada in 2009.
