= Zeeshan Siddiqi =

Canadian cricketer (born 1976)

Personal information
- Full name: Zeeshan Hussain Siddiqi
- Born: 26 October 1976 (age 50); Karachi, Sindh, Pakistan
- Batting: Right-handed
- Bowling: Right-arm offbreak
- Role: Wicket-keeper

International information
- National side: Canada (2012–2014)
- ODI debut (cap 81): 11 July 2012 v Scotland
- Last ODI: 23 January 2014 v Scotland

Domestic team information
- Years: Team
- 1995–1997: Pakistan National Shipping Corporation
- 1998–1999: Karachi Blues
- 1999–2000: Karachi Whites

Career statistics
Competition	ODI	FC	LA
Matches	2	14	6
Runs scored	50	738	62
Batting average	25.00	32.08	10.33
100s/50s	0/0	0/7	0/0
Top score	43	87	43
Catches/stumpings	0/0	12/0	6/0
- Source: ESPNcricinfo, CricketArchive, 27 September 2024

Zeeshan Hussain Siddiqi (born 26 October 1976) is a Pakistani-born Canadian international cricketer. Born in Karachi, he made his first-class debut in 1995 for Pakistan National Shipping Corporation. He later played for both Karachi Blues and Karachi Whites. In 2011, he made his international debut for Canada.
