= Omer Hussain =

Scottish cricketer (born 1984)

Personal information
- Full name: Rana Omer Hussain
- Born: 3 December 1984 (age 41); Paisley, Renfrewshire, Scotland
- Batting: Left-handed
- Role: Wicket-keeper
- Relatives: Majid Haq (cousin)

International information
- National side: Scotland (2005–2010)
- ODI debut (cap 23): 5 August 2006 v Ireland
- Last ODI: 10 July 2010 v Ireland

Career statistics
Competition	ODI	FC	LA
Matches	8	3	17
Runs scored	63	10	193
Batting average	9.00	5.00	13.78
100s/50s	0/0	0/0	0/1
Top score	17	8	52
Catches/stumpings	1/–	1/–	3/–
- Source: CricketArchive, 29 March 2016

Omer Hussain (born 3 December 1984) is a Scottish cricket player of Pakistani descent. He made his debut for the Scottish cricket team on 18 September 2005 in a C&G Trophy match against Warwickshire. He has played seven times in all for Scotland, including two One Day Internationals. He has also represented his country at Under 15, Under 17, Under 19 and Under 23 level and at international levels. Omer Hussain is a left-handed batsman and is cousin of fellow Scottish international cricketer Majid Haq. Both Omer and Majid have played for Kelburne Cricket Club, Ferguslie Cricket Club and Omer currently plays for Kelburne Cricket Club

== Education ==
Omer was born and brought up in Paisley, Renfrewshire in Scotland to Pakistani parents. He attended Todholm Nursery and South Primary School in his early life. He then spent 5 years at Paisley Grammar School, then continuing his education at Reid Kerr College. Omer is a graduate in Electronic Engineering, obtaining his degree from the University of Paisley on 4 July 2006.

== Cricketing career ==
Omer and Majid grew up in the same house in Hunterhill, going to the same school and cricket clubs, firstly the Old Grammarians, then Kelburne, where they were coached by Roddy McLelland. At the end of 2002, Omer moved to rivals, Ferguslie Cricket Club after Roddy McLelland retired from coaching. Majid soon followed after the next season. Omer became involved in the game through his family who all played, perhaps his greatest influence was his cousin Majid Haq who he played with as a youngster and who played for Scotland at various age groups – and is a full international.

Omer regards the two highlights of his cricketing career to date as winning the Under-19 2002 European championships for Scotland and qualifying for the 2004 Under-19 World Cup in Bangladesh after finishing as runners up in the 2003 European U19 championship. Another highlight of his career was helping Ferguslie to lift the Colonel's Scottish Cup in 2005 in which Omer scored the remaining runs to beat Aberdeen.

== Current ==
Omer and his cousin Majid were selected for the provisional World Cup squad which is to take place in 2007 in the West Indies. They were both told to improve their fitness. Omer was offered a place to take part in a 7-week fitness improvement at the ICC 'boot camp' in the University of Pretoria. Omer was not selected for the tour of Dubai and Kenya, and for the World Cricket League Division One tournament which will determine whether Scotland will play in the 2007 Twenty20 World Championship being held in South Africa later in the year. Omer was not given the opportunity to show his batting skill and is determined to board the plane in which the England cricket team will also travel on. Omer is currently in Pakistan and is training with the Multan cricket team to improve his batting skill even more and mark his place in future cricket with Scotland. Omer Hussain was called to Kenya to compete in the ICC World Cricket League after fellow cricketer, Glenn Rogers was diagnosed with typhoid. Omer was officially reprimanded by the International Cricket Council after gesturing against his dismissal by the umpire in which he claimed was a wrong decision. Omer scored 121 runs for the Scotland A team in the 2nd XI County Championship against Yorkshire 2nd XI.

== See also ==
- List of British Asians
