= Steven de Bruin =

Dutch cricketer

Personal information
- Full name: Steven Thijs de Bruin
- Born: 5 September 1988 (age 38); Amstelveen, South Holland, Netherlands
- Batting: Left-handed
- Role: Wicket-keeper

Career statistics
Competition	First-class
Matches	2
Runs scored	48
Batting average	16.00
100s/50s	–/–
Top score	32
Catches/stumpings	5/–
- Source: Cricinfo, 8 February 2022

Steven Thijs de Bruin (born 5 September 1988) is a Dutch former first-class cricketer.

de Bruin was born at Amstelveen in September 1988. A club cricketer for Amstelveen Cricket Club, He was selected in the Dutch squad for their Intercontinental Cup fixture against Scotland in June 2010 at Deventer, with de Bruin making his first-class debut in the match. After a period playing for the Netherlands A side, which included a series against Jersey in June 2012. He returned to the Dutch side for their Intercontinental Cup fixture against the United Arab Emirates at Deventer in July 2012. In his two first-class matches in the Intercontinental Cup, he scored 48 runs at an average of 16.00, with a highest score of 32.
