= Safyaan Sharif =

Scottish cricketer

Personal information
- Full name: Safyaan Mohammed Sharif
- Born: 24 May 1991 (age 35); Huddersfield, Yorkshire, England
- Batting: Right-handed
- Bowling: Right-arm fast-medium
- Role: Bowler

International information
- National side: Scotland (2011–present)
- ODI debut (cap 45): 29 June 2011 v Netherlands
- Last ODI: 13 August 2026 v Canada
- ODI shirt no.: 50
- T20I debut (cap 24): 13 March 2012 v Kenya
- Last T20I: 17 April 2026 v Namibia

Domestic team information
- Years: Team
- 2018: Derbyshire
- 2021: Kent
- 2026: Edinburgh Castle Rockers

Career statistics
Competition	ODI	T20I	FC	LA
Matches	97	78	9	128
Runs scored	654	193	229	835
Batting average	19.81	12.06	28.62	18.15
100s/50s	0/0	0/0	0/1	0/0
Top score	40*	26	60	40*
Balls bowled	4,392	1,570	1,213	5,721
Wickets	122	87	18	161
Bowling average	30.13	24.41	36.33	30.06
5 wickets in innings	2	0	0	2
10 wickets in match	0	0	0	0
Best bowling	5/33	4/24	4/94	5/33
Catches/stumpings	22/–	17/–	5/–	26/–
- Source: Cricinfo, 15 August 2026

Safyaan Mohammed Sharif (born 24 May 1991) is a Scottish cricketer. He is a right-arm fast-medium bowler and a right-handed batsman. He made his international debut for Scotland in June 2011.

== Early life ==
Sharif was born on 24 May 1991 in Huddersfield, Yorkshire, England, to parents of Pakistani ancestry. His father, Mohammed, was a regular first XI player for Upper Largo.

Sharif grew up in Buckhaven. He began playing cricket as a teenager, representing Largo Lions at junior level before progressing to the senior team between 2006 and 2008. He also played for other Fife clubs, including Dunnikier (Kirkcaldy) and Dunfermline and Carnegie.

== Domestic and T20 franchise career ==
In May 2018, Sharif was signed by the English side Derbyshire County Cricket Club to play in the 2018 Royal London One-Day Cup and 2018 t20 Blast tournaments. In June 2019, he was selected to play for the Edmonton Royals franchise team in the 2019 Global T20 Canada tournament.

In July 2019, Sharif was selected to play for the Glasgow Giants in the inaugural edition of the Euro T20 Slam cricket tournament. However, the following month the tournament was cancelled, reportedly after the organizers ran into financial difficulties.

Since 2023, Sharif has played for Perth Doo'cot in the North East Championship.

== International career ==
Sharif made his debut for Scotland in a One Day International (ODI) against the Netherlands in the 2011-13 Intercontinental Cup One-Day competition in June 2011, taking figures of 4/27. The following month, he played two further One Day International's in the tri-nation series against Ireland and Sri Lanka, with both matches played at The Grange, Edinburgh.

He later made four List A appearances against English counties in the 2011 Clydesdale Bank 40. In September 2011, Sharif made his first-class debut in the 2011–13 ICC Intercontinental Cup against Namibia at the Wanderers Cricket Ground, Windhoek. Following the match, he played in Scotland's two List A matches against Namibia, which formed part of the ICC Intercontinental Cup One-Day competition. During the tour, he also made four Twenty20 appearances against the hosts, taking 8 wickets at an average of 10.37, with the best figures of 3/29.

In February 2012, Sharif made his second first-class appearance against the United Arab Emirates in the Intercontinental Cup. He was selected as part of Scotland's squad for the World Twenty20 Qualifier which proceeds their series against the United Arab Emirates.

In March 2018, during the 2018 Cricket World Cup Qualifier match against Zimbabwe at the Queens Sports Club in Bulawayo, Sharif took his first five-wicket haul in ODIs. The match finished as a tie, with Sharif named as the player of the match, with figures of five wickets for 33 runs off 8.4 overs. Following the conclusion of the Cricket World Cup Qualifier tournament, the International Cricket Council (ICC) named Sharif as the rising star of Scotland's squad.

In September 2019, Sharif was named in Scotland's squad for the 2019 ICC T20 World Cup Qualifier tournament in the United Arab Emirates. He was the leading wicket-taker for Scotland in the tournament, with thirteen dismissals in seven matches. In September 2021, Sharif was named in Scotland's provisional squad for the 2021 ICC Men's T20 World Cup.

In May 2024, he was named in Scotland's squad for the 2024 ICC Men's T20 World Cup tournament.

On 12 June 2025, Sharif took his 259th wicket for Scotland across all formats in an ODI against the Netherlands at Forthill to become the record wicket-taker for his country.
