= Shahbaz Bashir =

Dutch cricketer

Personal information
- Full name: Mohammad Shahbaz Bashir
- Born: 27 December 1983 (age 42); Lahore, Punjab, Pakistan
- Batting: Right-handed
- Bowling: Right-arm fast-medium

Domestic team information
- Years: Team
- 2002/03: Pakistan Cricket Board Greens
- 2012: Netherlands

Career statistics
Competition	First-class	List A
Matches	1	4
Runs scored	102	35
Batting average	102.00	11.66
100s/50s	1/–	–/–
Top score	102	30
Balls bowled	54	52
Wickets	1	1
Bowling average	5.00	55.00
5 wickets in innings	–	–
10 wickets in match	–	–
Best bowling	1/5	1/36
Catches/stumpings	–/–	2/–
- Source: Cricinfo, 8 February 2022

Mohammad Shahbaz Bashir (born 27 December 1983) is a Pakistani-born Dutch former cricketer.

Bashir was born at Lahore in December 1983. He was made his debut in List A one-day cricket for the Pakistan Cricket Board Greens against the Pakistan Cricket Board Blues at Lahore in November 2002. He later emigrated to the Netherlands, qualifying to play for them through residency in 2012. He made a single appearance in first-class cricket for the Netherlands against United Arab Emirates (UAE) in July 2012 at Deventer in the Intercontinental Cup. He became the first Dutch player to a score a century on first-class debut, making 102. Bashir also made three List A appearances for the Netherlands, the first coming against Leicestershire in the 2012 Clydesdale Bank 40, an English domestic one-day tournament the Netherlands were invited to take part in. He then made a further two appearances against the UAE following the Intercontinental Cup match. In four List A appearances, Bashir scored 35 runs with a highest score of 30. He took a wicket apiece in both first-class and List A cricket.
