= Ian Ramage =

Scottish cricket umpire

Personal information
- Full name: Ian Norman Ramage
- Born: 5 November 1958 (age 68); Edinburgh, Scotland
- Role: Umpire

Umpiring information
- ODIs umpired: 35 (2008–2017)
- T20Is umpired: 7 (2012–2018)
- WODIs umpired: 7 (2013–2017)
- WT20Is umpired: 2 (2013)
- Source: ESPNcricinfo, 13 June 2018

Ian Ramage (born 5 November 1958) is a cricket umpire from Scotland. He stood in his first One Day International (ODI) match on 24 August 2008, between Ireland and Kenya in Belfast. His Twenty20 International (T20I) umpiring debut match was on 24 July 2012, between Bangladesh and Scotland in The Hague.

He was one of the 17 on-field umpires for the 2018 Under-19 Cricket World Cup. In March 2019, Ramage announced his retirement from international duties, but would continue to work with the England and Wales Cricket Board (ECB). He appeared in four U19 World Cup and is the most decorated Scottish umpire of all time

== See also ==
- List of One Day International cricket umpires
- List of Twenty20 International cricket umpires
