= Marc Petrie =

Scottish cricketer (born 1990)

Personal information
- Full name: Marc John Petrie
- Born: 2 March 1990 (age 36); Dundee, Scotland
- Batting: Right-handed
- Role: Wicket-keeper

International information
- National side: Scotland
- ODI debut (cap 39): 7 July 2009 v Canada
- Last ODI: 28 August 2009 v Australia

Career statistics
Competition	ODI	LA	T20
Matches	4	7	2
Runs scored	3	16	0
Batting average	1.50	4.00	0.00
100s/50s	0/0	0/0	0/0
Top score	3	7*	0*
Catches/stumpings	3/1	3/1	0/0
- Source: Cricinfo, 28 March 2022

Marc Petrie (born 2 March 1990) is a Scottish cricketer. He made his One Day International debut against Canada in 2009.
