= Thijs van Schelven =

Dutch cricketer (born 1989)

Personal information
- Full name: Matthijs Bastiaan van Schelven
- Born: 3 April 1989 (age 37); The Hague, Netherlands
- Batting: Left-handed
- Bowling: Slow left-arm orthodox
- Role: Bowler

International information
- National side: Netherlands (2015)
- T20I debut (cap 32): 1 July 2015 v Nepal
- Last T20I: 2 July 2015 v Nepal

Career statistics
Competition	T20I	LA	T20
Matches	2	3	3
Runs scored	–	–	–
Batting average	–	–	–
100s/50s	–	–	–
Top score	–	–	–
Balls bowled	42	114	48
Wickets	3	2	3
Bowling average	10.00	40.00	13.66
5 wickets in innings	0	0	0
10 wickets in match	0	0	0
Best bowling	2/22	2/40	2/22
Catches/stumpings	1/–	1/–	1/–
- Source: Cricinfo, 17 August 2017

Matthijs Bastiaan van Schelven (born 3 April 1989) is a Dutch cricketer. He made his List A cricket debut in the 2015 ICC World Cricket League Division Two tournament for the Netherlands against Kenya on 21 January 2015. He made his Twenty20 International debut for the Netherlands against Nepal on 1 July 2015.
