= Mohammad Kashif (Dutch cricketer) =

Dutch cricketer (born 1984)

Personal information
- Full name: Mohammad Kashif Hussain
- Born: 3 December 1984 (age 41); Khanewal, Pakistan
- Nickname: Kash
- Batting: Right-handed
- Bowling: Right-arm offbreak

International information
- National side: Netherlands (2006–2010)
- ODI debut (cap 27): 4 July 2006 v Sri Lanka
- Last ODI: 19 April 2009 v Kenya
- ODI shirt no.: 74

Career statistics
Competition	ODI	T20I	FC
Matches	11	3	6
Runs scored	1	0	59
Batting average	0.33	–	11.80
100s/50s	0/0	0/0	0/0
Top score	1	0*	24*
Balls bowled	450	42	919
Wickets	9	4	16
Bowling average	45.55	13.75	31.37
5 wickets in innings	0	0	1
10 wickets in match	0	0	0
Best bowling	3/42	2/28	5/53
Catches/stumpings	2/–	1/–	3/–
- Source: Cricinfo, 10 May 2017

Mohammad Kashif Hussain (Urdu: محمد کاشف حسین; born 3 December 1984) is a Dutch cricketer. He is a right-handed batsman and a slow right-arm off-break bowler.

He made his debut for the Dutch cricket team in an ICC Intercontinental Cup game against Kenya on 29 March 2006. His One Day International debut came against Sri Lanka on 4 July 2006. His last ODI to-date was against Kenya in April 2009. He has also represented the Netherlands A and Under-23 teams.
