= Ewan Chalmers =

Scottish cricketer

Personal information
- Full name: Ewan Fraser Chalmers
- Born: 19 October 1989 (age 37); Edinburgh, Scotland
- Batting: Right-handed
- Bowling: Right-arm medium

International information
- National side: Scotland (2009–2013)
- Source: CricketArchive, 2 February 2016

Ewan Fraser Chalmers (born 19 October 1989) is a Scottish cricketer who made his debut for the Scottish national side in 2009. He is a right-handed top-order batsman.

Chalmers was born in Edinburgh, and attended George Watson's College before going on to the University of St Andrews. He played for the Scotland under-19s at the 2007 and 2008 editions of the ICC Europe Under-19 Championships. Chalmers made his debut for Scotland A in May 2007, in the English Second XI Championship. His Scottish senior debut came in July 2009, in a first-class match against Canada (part of the 2009–10 Intercontinental Cup). Chalmers made his maiden first-class fifty in August 2010, making 67 against Afghanistan. In another Intercontinental Cup game against Kenya in July 2013, he scored 106 runs from 221 balls opening the batting with Freddie Coleman.
