= Craig Wallace (cricketer) =

Scottish cricketer

Personal information
- Full name: Craig Donald Wallace
- Born: 27 June 1990 (age 36); Dundee, Scotland
- Batting: Right-handed
- Role: Wicket-keeper

International information
- National side: Scotland (2011–2022)
- ODI debut (cap 47): 11 July 2012 v Canada
- Last ODI: 17 August 2022 v USA
- T20I debut (cap 25): 13 March 2012 v Kenya
- Last T20I: 27 October 2021 v Namibia

Career statistics
Competition	ODI	T20I	FC	LA
Matches	32	21	8	66
Runs scored	574	173	191	916
Batting average	21.25	17.30	17.36	18.69
100s/50s	0/4	0/0	0/0	0/4
Top score	58	27	35	58
Catches/stumpings	17/2	7/2	3/1	30/5
- Source: Cricinfo, 25 September 2022

Craig Donald Wallace (born 27 June 1990) is a Scottish cricketer. Wallace is a right-handed batsman who fields as a wicket-keeper. He also currently serves as Head Coach of the Scotland Women's national team. He was born in Dundee and was educated at the High School of Dundee.

Wallace made his debut for Scotland in a List A match against Hampshire at the Rose Bowl in the 2011 Clydesdale Bank 40. Scotland toured Namibia in September 2011, despite not featuring in Scotland's first-class Intercontinental Cup match against Namibia, he did feature in the two List A matches which proceeded that match. He also made his Twenty20 debut on the tour against the hosts, making four appearances. He was selected as part of Scotland's squad for the World Twenty20 Qualifier.

In June 2019, he was selected to represent Scotland A in their tour to Ireland to play the Ireland Wolves. In July 2019, he was selected to play for the Edinburgh Rocks in the inaugural edition of the Euro T20 Slam cricket tournament. However, the following month the tournament was cancelled.

In September 2019, he was named in Scotland's squad for the 2019 ICC T20 World Cup Qualifier tournament in the United Arab Emirates. In September 2021, Wallace was named in Scotland's provisional squad for the 2021 ICC Men's T20 World Cup.

Having already been Scotland Women's interim head coach for a year, Wallace was appointed to the role permanently in August 2024.
