= Ryan Flannigan =

Scottish cricketer

Personal information
- Full name: Ryan Flannigan
- Born: 30 June 1988 (age 38); Kelso, Roxburghshire, Scotland
- Batting: Right-handed
- Bowling: Right-arm medium

International information
- National side: Scotland
- Only ODI (cap 45): 17 August 2010 v Afghanistan

Career statistics
Competition	ODI	FC	LA	T20
Matches	1	4	18	4
Runs scored	0	238	227	38
Batting average	0.00	34.00	15.13	12.66
100s/50s	0/0	1/1	0/0	0/0
Top score	0	102	39	18
Catches/stumpings	0/–	3/–	4/–	0/–
- Source: Cricinfo, 19 August 2012

Ryan Flannigan (born 30 June 1988) is a Scottish cricketer. Flannigan is a right-handed batsman who bowls right-arm medium pace. He was born at Kelso and attended Napier University, Edinburgh.

Flannigan made his debut for Scotland against India A in June 2010, making two List A appearances the tourists. Later in August 2010, he made his first-class debut in the 2009–10 Intercontinental Cup against Afghanistan at Cambusdoon New Ground, Ayr. Following this match, he made what is to date his only One Day International appearance against the same opposition, though he was dismissed for a duck by Shapoor Zadran. Later in the 2010 season, he made two appearances in the Clydesdale Bank 40 against Leicestershire and Durham.

Flannigan featured on a regular basis for Scotland in the 2011 Clydesdale Bank 40, making six List A appearances during the competition, though he only scored 92 runs at an average of 15.33. In June 2011, he made his second first-class appearance against the Netherlands in the 2011–13 Intercontinental Cup at Mannofield Park, Aberdeen, with him later making another first-class appearance in September 2011 against Namibia in the same competition at the Wanderers Cricket Ground, Windhoek. During this match, he scored his maiden first-class century with a score of 102 in Scotland's first-innings. Following this match, Flannigan made his Twenty20 debut on the tour, making two appearances against the host nation.

In February 2012, he made a further first-class appearance against the United Arab Emirates at Sharjah in the Intercontinental Cup. He was selected as part of Scotland's squad for the World Twenty20 Qualifier which proceeded their series against the United Arab Emirates.
