= Rahil Ahmed =

Dutch cricketer (born 1994)

Personal information
- Full name: Rahil Izhar Ahmed
- Born: 3 January 1994 (age 32); Amsterdam, Netherlands
- Height: 1.71 m (5 ft 7 in)
- Batting: Right-handed
- Role: Wicket-keeper

International information
- National side: Netherlands (2015–present)
- T20I debut (cap 34): 2 July 2015 v Nepal
- Last T20I: 3 July 2015 v Nepal

Career statistics
Competition	T20I	FC	LA	T20
Matches	2	2	3	2
Runs scored	38	18	48	38
Batting average	19.00	4.50	24.00	19.00
100s/50s	0/0	0/0	0/0	0/0
Top score	25	8	41	25
Catches/stumpings	0/–	1/–	0/–	0/–
- Source: ESPNcricinfo, 17 August 2017

Rahil Izhar Ahmed (born 3 January 1994) is a Dutch cricketer. He made his List A cricket debut in the 2015 ICC World Cricket League Division Two tournament for the Netherlands against Kenya on 21 January 2015. He made his Twenty20 International debut against Nepal on 2 July 2015. He made his first class debut against Scotland in the 2015–17 ICC Intercontinental Cup on 9 September 2015.
