= Quirijn Gunning =

Dutch cricketer

Personal information
- Full name: Quirijn Willem Marinus Gunning
- Born: 18 March 1991 (age 35); Amsterdam, Netherlands
- Batting: Right-handed
- Bowling: Right-arm medium

International information
- National side: Netherlands (2013–present)

Career statistics
Competition	FC	LA
Matches	5	3
Runs scored	44	2
Batting average	8.80	2.00
100s/50s	0/0	0/0
Top score	17	2
Balls bowled	660	111
Wickets	9	3
Bowling average	44.33	32.00
5 wickets in innings	0	0
10 wickets in match	0	n/a
Best bowling	2/10	2/27
Catches/stumpings	2/–	0/–
- Source: CricketArchive, 1 October 2017

Quirijn Willem Marinus Gunning (born 18 March 1991) is a Dutch international cricketer who made his debut for the Dutch national side in June 2013. He is a right-arm medium-pace bowler.

Gunning was born in Amsterdam, and plays his club cricket for VRA Amsterdam. He played for the Netherlands under-19s at the 2009 Under-19 World Cup Qualifier, but failed to take a wicket in his four matches. Gunning's senior debut for the Netherlands came against Nottinghamshire in the 2013 Yorkshire Bank 40, an English limited-overs competition. His first-class debut less than two weeks later, against Ireland in the Intercontinental Cup. After that game, Gunning did not return to the Dutch line-up until June 2015, when he appeared in another Intercontinental Cup fixture against Papua New Guinea.

In June 2018, he was named in the Netherlands' Twenty20 International (T20I) squad for the 2018 Netherlands Tri-Nation Series, but he did not play.
