= Neil Kruger =

South African cricketer (born 1981)

Personal information
- Full name: Neil Kruger
- Born: 15 August 1981 (age 45); Cape Town, Cape Province, South Africa
- Batting: Right-handed
- Bowling: Right-arm medium

Domestic team information
- Years: Team
- 2008–2010: Oxford University

Career statistics
Competition	First-class
Matches	3
Runs scored	381
Batting average	76.20
100s/50s	1/1
Top score	172
Balls bowled	–
Wickets	–
Bowling average	–
5 wickets in innings	–
10 wickets in match	–
Best bowling	–
Catches/stumpings	4/–
- Source: ESPNCricinfo, 17 January 2011

Neil Kruger (born 15 August 1981 in Cape Town, South Africa) is a first-class cricketer, who made his debut for Oxford University cricket team in 2008, scoring 172 in the Varsity Match. Since June 2011, Kruger has also represented the Netherlands.

A Rhodes Scholar and orthopedic surgeon, he studied at Green Templeton College at the University of Oxford. He held a scholarship for sporting achievement from Green Templeton College. Kruger also played varsity golf.
