= Hamish Gardiner =

Australian-born Scottish cricketer (born 1991)

Personal information
- Full name: Hamish John William Gardiner
- Born: 4 January 1991 (age 35); Brisbane, Queensland, Australia
- Batting: Right-handed
- Role: Top order batsman

International information
- National side: Scotland (2013–2015)
- ODI debut (cap 54): 3 September 2013 v Australia
- Last ODI: 5 March 2015 v Bangladesh
- ODI shirt no.: 48

Career statistics
Competition	ODI	FC	LA
Matches	11	3	18
Runs scored	262	59	460
Batting average	23.81	11.80	27.05
100s/50s	0/2	0/0	0/3
Top score	96	46	96
Catches/stumpings	4/–	5/–	6/–
- Source: CricketArchive, 28 August 2016

Hamish John William Gardiner (born 4 January 1991) is an Australian-born Scottish cricketer. He made his One Day International (ODI) debut against Australia on 3 September 2013 at The Grange Club.

Gardiner was born in Brisbane but spent time growing up in Edinburgh.
