= James Gruijters =

Dutch cricketer

Personal information
- Full name: James Felix Mathieson Gruijters
- Born: 9 August 1993 (age 33); Den Haag, Netherlands
- Batting: Right-hand bat
- Bowling: Right-arm offbreak
- Relatives: Tim Gruijters (brother)

International information
- National side: Netherlands (2013)

Career statistics
Competition	FC	List A
Matches	1	3
Runs scored	5	25
Batting average	2.50	12.50
100s/50s	0/0	0/0
Top score	5	25
Catches/stumpings	1/-	0/-
- Source: Cricinfo, 3 December 2025

James Felix Mathieson Gruijters (born 9 August 1993) is a Dutch international cricketer who made his debut for the Dutch national side in June 2013. He is a right-handed middle-order batsman.

The younger brother of Tim Gruijters, who has also represented the Netherlands, Gruijters was born in The Hague, and plays his club cricket for Quick Haag. A former Dutch under-19s player, he made his senior debut for the Netherlands in the 2013 Yorkshire Bank 40, an English domestic competition. Later in the year, Gruijters was selected for an Intercontinental Cup fixture against Ireland, which held first-class status.
