= Gordon Goudie =

Scottish cricketer (born 1987)

Personal information
- Born: 12 August 1987 (age 39)
- Batting: Right-handed
- Bowling: Right-arm medium-fast

International information
- National side: Scotland
- ODI debut (cap 31): 2 July 2008 v Ireland
- Last ODI: 3 September 2013 v Australia
- T20I debut (cap 19): 1 February 2010 v Kenya
- Last T20I: 24 July 2012 v Bangladesh

Domestic team information
- Years: Team
- 2004–2013: Scotland

Career statistics
Competition	ODI	T20I	FC	LA
Matches	16	5	13	66
Runs scored	80	23	172	413
Batting average	10.00	11.50	11.46	12.14
100s/50s	0/0	0/0	0/0	0/0
Top score	23	9*	44*	45
Balls bowled	729	83	1,610	2,629
Wickets	23	4	28	85
Bowling average	27.08	31.25	26.03	30.11
5 wickets in innings	1	0	0	1
10 wickets in match	0	0	0	0
Best bowling	5/73	3/22	4/58	5/73
Catches/stumpings	5/–	3/–	7/–	21/–
- Source: Cricinfo, 3 September 2013

Gordon Goudie (born 12 August 1987) is a Scottish cricketer. He currently plays for Scottish League side Mazars Grange CC as well as for the Scotland national cricket team. Goudie made his One Day International (ODI) debut in July 2008, and in February 2010 played his first Twenty20 International. In December 2008, Goudie became one of the first three players to be awarded a contract with Cricket Scotland as the board looked to increase professionalism.

== Career ==
After playing for the MCC Young Cricketers in 2005, Goudie signed a contract with Middlesex that year, but was released in 2006. Later in 2005, Goudie was called up to play for the Scottish Saltires; the Saltires were playing in the National League and were stuck at the bottom of the second division. He represented Scotland Under-19s at the 2006 Under-19 World Cup. His batting was sufficiently good that coach Peter Drinnen considered moving him to the top of the order.

Until 2008, the Scotland cricket team was made up of amateurs, players did not have contracts with the game's governing body in the country, Cricket Scotland, and balanced their sports careers with full-time jobs. Cricket Scotland began professionalising the national team in December 2008 with the introduction of contracts for three of its players. Goudie was one of the three along with fellow fast-bowler Dewald Nel and then captain Ryan Watson, allowing them to focus on playing cricket. By the following March, Goudie was noticing the effects of being able to concentrate his efforts on cricket, saying "It has made a big difference. It has given us the time to fit in all the training that we need in preparation for the [2009 World Cup Qualifier] and the coming season. We don't have to cram in training sessions around work." He also included in Scotland's 15-man squad for the World Cup Qualifier in April 2009, however Goudie suffered an injury during the tournament and returned home before its conclusion.

Cricket Scotland increased the number of players with full-time contracts to six in 2010, and Goudie retained his contract.
