= Tim Gruijters =

Dutch cricketer (born 1991)

Personal information
- Full name: Timothy George Johannes Gruijters
- Born: 28 August 1991 (age 35); The Hague, Netherlands
- Batting: Right-handed
- Bowling: Right-arm spin
- Role: All-rounder
- Relatives: James Gruijters (brother)

International information
- National side: Netherlands
- ODI debut: 16 February 2010 v Kenya
- Last ODI: 29 August 2013 v Canada
- T20I debut: 22 March 2012 v Scotland
- Last T20I: 28 November 2013 v Scotland

Career statistics
Competition	ODI	T20I	FC	LA
Matches	5	8	6	25
Runs scored	68	51	95	247
Batting average	22.66	21.18	8.63	16.46
100s/50s	0/0	0/0	0/0	0/0
Top score	32	21*	29	44
Balls bowled	120	72	6	302
Wickets	2	3	0	6
Bowling average	39.50	24.66	–	40.66
5 wickets in innings	0	0	–	0
10 wickets in match	0	0	–	0
Best bowling	2/37	1/5	–	2/37
Catches/stumpings	2/–	4/–	1/–	10/–
- Source: CricketArchive, 10 December 2022

Tim Gruijters (born 28 August 1991) is a Dutch cricketer. He is a right-handed batsman and right-arm spin bowler.

Gruijters made his One Day International debut for the Dutch national team against Kenya on 16 February 2010. He has played a further four ODIs for the national side after his debut match. He made his Twenty20 International debut against Scotland on 22 March 2012, scoring 11 runs from six balls.
