= Majid Haq =

Scottish cricketer (born 1983)

Personal information
- Full name: Rana Majid Haq Khan
- Born: 11 February 1983 (age 43); Paisley, Renfrewshire, Scotland
- Height: 5 ft 11 in (1.80 m)
- Batting: Left-handed
- Bowling: Right-arm off break
- Role: All-rounder
- Relatives: Omer Hussain (cousin); Hamza Tahir (cousin)

International information
- National side: Scotland (2002–2015)
- ODI debut (cap 28): 12 December 2006 v Bangladesh
- Last ODI: 5 March 2015 v Bangladesh
- ODI shirt no.: 77 (previously 10)
- T20I debut (cap 4): 12 September 2007 v Pakistan
- Last T20I: 28 November 2013 v Netherlands
- T20I shirt no.: 77

Career statistics
Competition	ODI	T20I	FC	LA
Matches	54	21	19	152
Runs scored	566	64	645	1,460
Batting average	16.64	12.80	25.80	17.59
100s/50s	0/3	0/0	1/1	0/6
Top score	71	21*	120*	71
Balls bowled	2,633	450	3,465	6,539
Wickets	60	28	60	144
Bowling average	32.91	16.85	22.41	36.65
5 wickets in innings	1	0	2	1
10 wickets in match	0	0	0	0
Best bowling	5/54	3/20	6/32	5/54
Catches/stumpings	10/–	4/–	10/–	21/–
- Source: CricketArchive, 29 March 2016

Rana Majid Haq Khan (born 11 February 1983), better known as Majid Haq, is a Scottish cricketer. He is a left-handed batsman and an off spin bowler. He has represented Scotland at Under 17, Under 19 and Under 23 levels, making his debut for the senior side on 20 July 2002 in a European Championship match against an England Board XI. He was a member of the Scottish squad for the 2007 World Cup in the West Indies. Haq is a cousin of fellow cricketer Omer Hussain. Both Hussain and Haq have played for Kelburne Cricket Club, Ferguslie Cricket Club and Clydesdale Cricket Club. He now plays for the Ayrshire-based club, Prestwick Cricket Club. Haq is of Pakistani descent.

== Cricketing career ==
Haq and cousin Omer Hussain grew up in the same house in Hunterhill, going to the same school and cricket clubs, firstly the Old Grammarians, then Kelburne, where they were coached by Roddy McLelland. At the end of 2002, Omer moved to rivals, Ferguslie Cricket Club after Roddy McLelland retired from coaching. Haq soon followed after the next season. Haq became involved in the game through his family who all played cricket, with him influencing his cousin Omer who he played with as a youngster and who has played for Scotland at various age groups – and is also a full Scottish international cricketer.

Haq regards the highlight of his cricketing career to date as beating Durham and Lancashire in the National League in 2003 and also participating in the 2007 Cricket World Cup held in the West Indies.

Haq and his cousin Omer Hussain were selected for the provisional World Cup squad which took take place in 2007 in the West Indies. They were both told to improve their fitness if they wanted to maintain their space in the squad. Haq was selected for the tour of Dubai and Kenya, and for the World Cricket League Division One tournament in which they were runners up making way for them to contest in the 2007 Twenty20 World Championship being held in South Africa later 2007. His cousin Omer however was not selected and lost his place in the final world cup squad to fellow cricketer Glenn Rogers.

Haq trialed with Warwickshire County Cricket Club in March 2008.

== Racism allegations ==
Haq was sent home from the 2015 World Cup in Australia after suggesting that his omission from the Scotland team may have been on racial grounds. In November 2021 he called for an investigation into possible racism in Scottish cricket.
