= Tom Heggelman =

Dutch cricketer (born 1987)

Personal information
- Full name: Thomas Josephus Heggelman
- Born: 16 January 1987 (age 39); Schiedam, Netherlands
- Batting: Right-handed
- Bowling: Right-arm medium
- Role: All-rounder

International information
- National side: Netherlands
- ODI debut (cap 48): 16 August 2010 v Ireland
- Last ODI: 12 September 2011 v Kenya

Career statistics
Competition	ODI	FC	LA	T20
Matches	5	4	23	2
Runs scored	27	202	73	–
Batting average	5.40	33.66	6.63	–
100s/50s	0/0	0/1	0/0	–
Top score	22	59	22	–
Balls bowled	102	186	367	6
Wickets	5	3	10	0
Bowling average	17.20	40.66	34.90	–
5 wickets in innings	0	0	0	–
10 wickets in match	0	0	0	–
Best bowling	3/29	2/41	3/29	–
Catches/stumpings	1/–	2/–	6/–	0/–
- Source: CricketArchive, 6 February 2016

Thomas Josephus Heggelman (born 16 January 1987) is a Dutch cricketer. An allrounder, Heggelman bats and bowls right-handed . He played for the Netherlands in the 2014 ICC World Twenty20 tournament. The last of his five One Day International appearances for the Netherlands was in September 2011 against Kenya.
