= 2026 Netherlands Tri-Nation Series =

Twentieth tri-nation series round in 2024-26 WCL2

- Part of 2024–2026 Cricket World Cup League 2
- Round 20
- Date: 21 – 31 July 2026
- Location: Netherlands
Teams
Namibia	Nepal	Netherlands
Captains
Gerhard Erasmus	Rohit Paudel	Scott Edwards
Most runs
Jan Frylinck (246)	Aasif Sheikh (113)	Scott Edwards (225)
Most wickets
Jack Brassell (8) JJ Smit (8)	Karan KC (9)	Logan van Beek (8)

The 2026 Netherlands Tri-Nation Series was the twentieth round of the 2024–2026 Cricket World Cup League 2 cricket tournament which is taking place in the Netherlands since 21 July 2026. It was a tri-nation series contested by the men's national teams of Namibia, Nepal and the Netherlands. The matches were played as One Day International (ODI) fixtures.

== Nepal in Jersey ==
Prior to the start of the League 2 series, the Nepal cricket team toured Jersey for two 50-over one day matches against the Jersey cricket team on 13 and 15 July 2026.

Nepal cricket team in Jersey in 2026
	Jersey	Nepal
- Dates: 13 – 15 July 2026
Captains	Charles Perchard	Rohit Paudel

LA series
- Result: Nepal won the 2-match series 2–0
Most runs	Charlie Brennan (89)	Kushal Bhurtel (156)
Most wickets	Charles Perchard (3)	Hemant Dhami (4); Karan KC (4)

=== Squads ===
Jersey	Nepal
Charles Perchard (c); Daniel Birrell; Dominic Blampied; Charlie Brennan; Toby Britton; Harrison Carlyon; Jake Dunford (wk); Patrick Gouge; Nick Greenwood; Jonty Jenner; Stanley Norman; George Richardson; Julius Sumerauer; Zak Tribe; Scott van Breda; Benjamin Ward	Rohit Paudel (c); Dipendra Singh Airee (vc); Binod Bhandari (wk); Kushal Bhurtel; Gulshan Jha; Sompal Kami; Karan KC; Arjun Kumal; Sandeep Lamichhane; Ishan Pandey; Lalit Rajbanshi; Bhim Sharki; Aarif Sheikh; Aasif Sheikh (wk); Nandan Yadav

Nepal named Shahab Alam, Aakash Chand, Hemant Dhami, Sundeep Jora and Yuvraj Khatri as reserves.

=== Fixtures ===
Match 1
13 July 2026
11:00
Scorecard

Nepal; 250/8 (50 overs)	v	Jersey; 169 (41 overs)
Kushal Bhurtel 105 (117); Daniel Birrell 2/38 (7 overs)		Charlie Brennan 82* (111); Hemant Dhami 4/37 (7 overs)

Nepal won by 81 runs
NCC Grainville, St Saviour
Player of the match: Kushal Bhurtel (Nep)

- Jersey won the toss and elected to field.

Match 2
15 July 2026
11:00
Scorecard

Jersey; 282/6 (50 overs)	v	Nepal; 251/5 (46 overs)
Patrick Gouge 95 (110); Karan KC 2/39 (5 overs)		Ishan Pandey 90 (115); Charles Perchard 2/42 (10 overs)

Nepal won by 7 runs (DLS method)
NCC Grainville, St Saviour
Player of the match: Patrick Gouge (Jer)

- Nepal won the toss and elected to field.
- No further play was possible due to rain.

== Netherlands A vs Namibia XI ==
Prior to the start of the League 2 series, Namibia played against Netherlands A on 15 and 17 July 2026.

Namibia cricket team against Netherlands A in 2026
	Netherlands A	Namibia XI
- Dates: 15 – 17 July 2026
Captains	Ryan Klein	Gerhard Erasmus

LA series
- Result: Namibia XI won the 2-match series 2–0
Most runs	Teja Nidamanuru (49)	Michael van Lingen (141)
Most wickets	Cole Rushforth (3)	Ruben Trumpelmann (5)

=== Squads ===
Namibia XI	Netherlands A
Gerhard Erasmus (c); Jan Balt; Jack Brassell; Jan Frylinck; Zane Green (wk); Max Heingo; Malan Kruger; Jan Nicol Loftie-Eaton; Bernard Scholtz; JJ Smit; Waldo Smith; Louren Steenkamp; Ruben Trumpelmann; Michael van Lingen; Alexander Volschenk	Ryan Klein (c); Shariz Ahmad; Musa Ahmed; Sebastiaan Braat; Lucas del Bianco; Olivier Elenbaas; Clayton Floyd; Pierre Jacod; Aadit Jain; Micheal Levitt; Teja Nidamanuru; Tim Pringle; Michael Rippon; Cole Rushforth; David Rushmere (wk); Vikramjit Singh; Johan Smal; Sikander Zulfiqar

Namibia named Dylan Leicher, Willem Myburgh, Ben Shikongo, Tim Short, Zacheo van Vuuren and Junior Taanyanda as reserves.

=== Fixtures ===
Match 1
15 July 2026
11:00
Scorecard

Netherlands A 195/9 (50 overs)	v	Namibia XI; 196/5 (42.1 overs)
Teja Nidamanuru 36 (67); Ruben Trumpelmann 3/31 (10 overs)		Michael van Lingen 83 (95); Teja Nidamanuru 1/11 (2 overs)

Namibia XI won by 5 wickets
VRA Amsterdam Cricket Ground, Amstelveen

- Namibia XI won the toss and elected to field.

Match 2
17 July 2026
11:00
Scorecard

Namibia XI; 266 (50 overs)	v	Netherlands A 182 (37 overs)
Michael van Lingen 58 (53); Clayton Floyd 2/32 (10 overs)		Michael Levitt 37 (41); Jack Brassell 3/42 (7 overs)

Namibia XI won by 84 runs
VRA Amsterdam Cricket Ground, Amstelveen

- Namibia XI won the toss and elected to bat.

== League 2 series ==
=== Squads ===
Namibia	Nepal	Netherlands
Gerhard Erasmus (c); Jan Balt; Jack Brassell; Alexander Volschenk; Jan Frylinck; Zane Green; Max Heingo; Malan Kruger; Jan Nicol Loftie-Eaton; Bernard Scholtz; JJ Smit; Waldo Smith; Louren Steenkamp; Ruben Trumpelmann; Michael van Lingen	Rohit Paudel (c); Dipendra Singh Airee (vc); Binod Bhandari (wk); Kushal Bhurtel; Hemant Dhami (Note: Nandan Yadav was ruled out for the remainder of the series due to a hamstring strain and was replaced by Hemant Dhami.); Gulshan Jha; Sompal Kami; Karan KC; Arjun Kumal; Sandeep Lamichhane; Ishan Pandey; Lalit Rajbanshi; Bhim Sharki; Aarif Sheikh; Aasif Sheikh (wk); ~~Nandan Yadav~~	Scott Edwards (c, wk); Noah Croes; Cedric de Lange; Bas de Leede; Aryan Dutt; Kyle Klein; Ryan Klein; Zach Lion-Cachet; Max O'Dowd; Tim Pringle; Alex Roy; Vikramjit Singh; Logan van Beek; Roelof van der Merwe; Saqib Zulfiqar

Nepal named Shahab Alam, Aakash Chand, Hemant Dhami, Sundeep Jora and Yuvraj Khatri as reserves.

Namibia named Dylan Leicher, Willem Myburgh, Ben Shikongo, Tim Short, Zacheo van Vuuren and Junior Taanyanda as reserves.

=== Fixtures ===
==== 1st ODI ====
21 July 2026
11:00
Scorecard

Nepal; 157 (46.5 overs)	v	Namibia; 159/2 (37.4 overs)
Rohit Paudel 31 (60); JJ Smit 6/27 (9.5 overs)		Jan Frylinck 77* (89); Nandan Yadav 1/17 (3 overs)

Namibia won by 8 wickets
Sportpark Maarschalkerweerd, Utrecht
Umpires: Rizwan Akram (Ned) and Nitin Bathi (Ned)
Player of the match: JJ Smit (Nam)

- Namibia won the toss and elected to field.
- Alexander Volschenk (Nam) made his ODI debut.

==== 2nd ODI ====
23 July 2026
11:00
Scorecard

Nepal; 157 (44.4 overs)	v	Netherlands; 158/4 (44.1 overs)
Aarif Sheikh 41 (90); Roelof van der Merwe 3/15 (6.4 overs)		Scott Edwards 61* (89); Dipendra Singh Airee 1/8 (4 overs)

Netherlands won by 6 wickets
Sportpark Maarschalkerweerd, Utrecht
Umpires: Rizwan Akram (Ned) and Roland Black (Ire)
Player of the match: Scott Edwards (Ned)

- Netherlands won the toss and elected to field.

==== 3rd ODI ====
25 July 2026
11:00
Scorecard

Netherlands; 251/6 (50 overs)	v	Namibia; 193 (47.5 overs)
Bas de Leede 97 (92); Jan Nicol Loftie-Eaton 2/50 (6 overs)		Louren Steenkamp 68 (87); Logan van Beek 4/29 (9 overs)

Netherlands won by 58 runs
Sportpark Maarschalkerweerd, Utrecht
Umpires: Nitin Bathi (Ned) and Roland Black (Ire)
Player of the match: Bas de Leede (Ned)

- Namibia won the toss and elected to field.

==== 4th ODI ====
27 July 2026
11:00
Scorecard

Namibia; 211/7 (50 overs)	v	Nepal; 208/6 (50 overs)
Jan Frylinck 100 (149); Karan KC 5/29 (10 overs)		Aasif Sheikh 45 (89); Jack Brassell 3/46 (10 overs)

Namibia won by 3 runs
Sportpark Maarschalkerweerd, Utrecht
Umpires: Rizwan Akram (Ned) and Nitin Bathi (Ned)
Player of the match: Jan Frylinck (Nam)

- Nepal won the toss and elected to field.
- Karan KC (Nep) became the first Nepalese fast bowler to take 100 ODI wickets.
- Aasif Sheikh (Nep) scored his 2,000th run in ODIs.

==== 5th ODI ====
29 July 2026
11:00
Scorecard

Netherlands; 225/9 (50 overs)	v	Nepal; 168 (48 overs)
Noah Croes 70 (93); Karan KC 4/30 (10 overs)		Aasif Sheikh 38 (78); Kyle Klein 3/26 (8 overs)

Netherlands won by 57 runs
Sportpark Maarschalkerweerd, Utrecht
Umpires: Nitin Bathi (Ned) and Roland Black (Ire)
Player of the match: Noah Croes (Ned)

- Nepal won the toss and elected to field.

==== 6th ODI ====
31 July 2026
11:00
Scorecard

Netherlands; 183 (48.5 overs)	v	Namibia; 186/4 (41 overs)
Scott Edwards 67* (85); Ruben Trumpelmann 3/39 (10 overs)		Jan Frylinck 68 (75); Alex Roy 1/8 (4 overs)

Namibia won by 6 wickets
Sportpark Maarschalkerweerd, Utrecht
Umpires: Rizwan Akram (Ned) and Roland Black (Ire)
Player of the match: Jan Frylinck (Nam)

- Netherlands won the toss and elected to bat.
