= 2025 Namibia Tri-Nation Series =

Tenth tri-nation series round in 2024-26 WCL2

The 2025 Namibia Tri-Nation Series was the tenth round of the 2024–2026 Cricket World Cup League 2 cricket tournament that took place in Namibia in March 2025. It was a tri-nation series contested by the men's national teams of Canada, Namibia and the Netherlands. The matches were played as One Day International (ODI) fixtures.

Following the ODI series, Namibia and Canada played a five-match Twenty20 International (T20I) series. Namibia won the series 3–0, after two of the matches got washed out due to rain.

== League 2 series ==
2025 Namibia Tri-Nation Series
- Part of 2024–2026 Cricket World Cup League 2
- Date: 5–15 March 2025
- Location: Namibia
- Player of the series: (Namibia) Gerhard Erasmus
Teams
Canada	Namibia	Netherlands
Captains
Nicholas Kirton	Gerhard Erasmus	Scott Edwards
Most runs
Navneet Dhaliwal (79)	Gerhard Erasmus (152)	Max O'Dowd (60)
Most wickets
Kaleem Sana (5)	Bernard Scholtz (10)	Aryan Dutt (6)

=== Squads ===
Canada	Namibia	Netherlands
Nicholas Kirton (c); Shahid Ahmadzai; Dilpreet Bajwa; Navneet Dhaliwal; Dilon Heyliger; Ajayveer Hundal; Akhil Kumar; Parveen Kumar; Shreyas Movva (wk); Saad Bin Zafar; Yuvraj Samra; Kaleem Sana; Pargat Singh; Kanwarpal Tathgur (wk); Harsh Thaker	Gerhard Erasmus (c); JJ Smit (vc); Niko Davin; Jan-Izak de Villiers; Shaun Fouché; Jan Frylinck; Zane Green (wk); Jean-Pierre Kotze (wk); Malan Kruger; Dylan Leicher; Jan Nicol Loftie-Eaton; Tangeni Lungameni; Bernard Scholtz; Ben Shikongo; Ruben Trumpelmann	Scott Edwards (c, wk); Colin Ackermann; Noah Croes; Bas de Leede; Aryan Dutt; Vivian Kingma; Fred Klaassen; Kyle Klein; Michael Levitt; Zach Lion-Cachet; Teja Nidamanuru; Max O'Dowd; Vikramjit Singh; Timm van der Gugten; Paul van Meekeren

Jack Brassell was named as a reserve in Namibia's squad.

=== Fixtures ===
==== 1st ODI ====
5 March 2025
09:30
Scorecard

Canada	v	Netherlands

No result
Wanderers Cricket Ground, Windhoek
Umpires: Andrew Louw (Nam) and Claus Schumacher (Nam)

- Netherlands won the toss and elected to field.
- No play was possible due to rain.
- Yuvraj Samra (Can) and Zach Lion-Cachet (Ned) both made their ODI debuts.

==== 2nd ODI ====
7 March 2025
09:30
Scorecard

Netherlands; 159 (39.1 overs)	v	Namibia; 106 (30 overs)
Teja Nidamanuru 47 (54); Bernard Scholtz 4/15 (8 overs)		Gerhard Erasmus 31 (39); Zach Lion-Cachet 3/15 (4 overs)

Netherlands won by 53 runs
Wanderers Cricket Ground, Windhoek
Umpires: Iknow Chabi (Zim) and Ewoud Lassen (Nam)
Player of the match: Teja Nidamanuru (Ned)

- Namibia won the toss and elected to field.
- The match was reduced to 40 overs per side due to rain.

==== 3rd ODI ====
9 March 2025
09:30
Scorecard

Canada; 167/8 (39 overs)	v	Namibia; 174 (39 overs)
Navneet Dhaliwal 54 (84); Bernard Scholtz 3/26 (9 overs)		Gerhard Erasmus 41 (56); Dilon Heyliger 3/45 (8 overs)

Match tied (DLS method, Canada won the Super Over)
Wanderers Cricket Ground, Windhoek
Umpires: Iknow Chabi (Zim) and Claus Schumacher (Nam)
Player of the match: Navneet Dhaliwal (Can)

- Canada won the toss and elected to bat.
- Namibia were set a revised target of 175 runs in 39 overs due to rain.
- Super Over: Namibia 3/2, Canada 7/0

==== 4th ODI ====
11 March 2025
09:30
Scorecard

Canada	v	Netherlands

Match abandoned
Wanderers Cricket Ground, Windhoek
Umpires: Ewoud Lassen (Nam) and Andrew Louw (Nam)

- No toss.
- No play was possible due to rain.

==== 5th ODI ====
13 March 2025
09:30
Scorecard

Namibia; 148 (44.5 overs)	v	Netherlands; 149/3 (37 overs)
Gerhard Erasmus 63 (102); Kyle Klein 3/14 (8.5 overs)		Colin Ackermann 54* (81); Bernard Scholtz 2/27 (10 overs)

Netherlands won by 7 wickets
Wanderers Cricket Ground, Windhoek
Umpires: Iknow Chabi (Zim) and Andrew Louw (Nam)
Player of the match: Colin Ackermann (Ned)

- Namibia won the toss and elected to bat.

==== 6th ODI ====
15 March 2025
09:30
Scorecard

Namibia; 186 (49 overs)	v	Canada; 154 (42 overs)
Jean-Pierre Kotze 48 (71); Kaleem Sana 4/33 (8 overs)		Yuvraj Samra 53 (74); Gerhard Erasmus 4/24 (9 overs)

Namibia won by 12 runs (DLS method)
Wanderers Cricket Ground, Windhoek
Umpires: Iknow Chabi (Zim) and Claus Schumacher (Nam)
Player of the match: Jan Nicol Loftie-Eaton (Nam)

- Namibia won the toss and elected to bat.
- Canada were set a revised target of 167 runs in 43 overs due to rain.

== Namibia v Canada T20I series ==
Canada cricket team in Namibia in 2024–25
	Namibia	Canada
- Dates: 18 – 23 March 2025
Captains	Gerhard Erasmus	Nicholas Kirton

Twenty20 International series
- Results: Namibia won the 5-match series 3–0
Most runs	Jan Nicol Loftie-Eaton (101)	Nicholas Kirton (63)
Most wickets	JJ Smit (7); Ruben Trumpelmann (7)	Akhil Kumar (4)
- Player of the series: JJ Smit (Nam)

=== Squads ===
Namibia	Canada
Gerhard Erasmus (c); Jack Brassell; Niko Davin; Jan-Izak de Villiers; Jan Frylinck; Zane Green (wk); Handre Klazinge; Jean-Pierre Kotze (wk); Malan Kruger; Dylan Leicher; Jan Nicol Loftie-Eaton (wk); Lo-handre Louwrens; Tangeni Lungameni; Bernard Scholtz; Ben Shikongo; JJ Smit; Ruben Trumpelmann	Nicholas Kirton (c); Shahid Ahmadzai; Dilpreet Bajwa; Navneet Dhaliwal; Dilon Heyliger; Aaron Johnson; Ajayveer Hundal; Akhil Kumar; Parveen Kumar; Shreyas Movva (wk); Saad Bin Zafar; Yuvraj Samra; Kaleem Sana; Pargat Singh; Ravinderpal Singh; Kanwarpal Tathgur; Harsh Thaker (wk)

=== Fixtures ===
==== 1st T20I ====
18 March 2025
14:00
Scorecard

Namibia	v	Canada

Match abandoned
Namibia Cricket Ground, Windhoek
Umpires: Ewoud Lassen (Nam) and Claus Schumacher (Nam)

- No toss.
- No play was possible due to a wet outfield.

==== 2nd T20I ====
19 March 2025
14:00
Scorecard

Canada; 145/8 (15 overs)	v	Namibia; 146/7 (15 overs)
Yuvraj Samra 37 (18); Ruben Trumpelmann 4/28 (3 overs)		Jan Nicol Loftie-Eaton 36 (21); Akhil Kumar 3/12 (3 overs)

Namibia won by 3 wickets
Namibia Cricket Ground, Windhoek
Umpires: Ewoud Lassen (Nam) and Andrew Louw (Nam)
Player of the match: JJ Smit (Nam)

- Namibia won the toss and elected to field.
- The match was reduced to 15 overs per side due to rain.
- Yuvraj Samra (Can) made his T20I debut.

==== 3rd T20I ====
21 March 2025
14:00
Scorecard

Namibia	v	Canada

Match abandoned
Namibia Cricket Ground, Windhoek
Umpires: Andrew Louw (Nam) and Claus Schumacher (Nam)

- No toss.
- No play was possible due to rain.

==== 4th T20I ====
22 March 2025
14:00
Scorecard

Canada; 42/7 (13 overs)	v	Namibia; 42/0 (2.4 overs)
Harsh Thaker 13 (23); JJ Smit 4/9 (4 overs)		Jean-Pierre Kotze 32* (14)

Namibia won by 10 wickets (DLS method)
Namibia Cricket Ground, Windhoek
Umpires: Ewoud Lassen (Nam) and Claus Schumacher (Nam)
Player of the match: JJ Smit (Nam)

- Canada won the toss and elected to bat.
- Namibia were set a revised target of 42 runs in 13 overs.
- Ajayveer Hundal (Can) made his T20I debut.

==== 5th T20I ====
23 March 2025
14:00
Scorecard

Canada; 142/7 (20 overs)	v	Namibia; 143/2 (15.2 overs)
Nicholas Kirton 37 (26); Jack Brassell 2/15 (4 overs)		Jan Nicol Loftie-Eaton 65 (32); Nicholas Kirton 1/12 (1 over)

Namibia won by 8 wickets
Namibia Cricket Ground, Windhoek
Umpires: Ewoud Lassen (Nam) and Andrew Louw (Nam)
Player of the match: Jan Nicol Loftie-Eaton (Nam)

- Namibia won the toss and elected to field.
