= 2023 Cricket World Cup squads =

This is a list of the squads picked for the 2023 Cricket World Cup. The 10 participating nations were instructed to finalise their 15-player squads prior to 28 September 2023, with any replacements after this date requiring approval from the International Cricket Council. All squads were announced by 26 September 2023. The oldest player of the tournament was Dutch player Wesley Barresi, who was 39 years old, while the youngest was Afghan spinner Noor Ahmad, who was 18.

== Key ==
Symbol	Meaning
S/N	Shirt number of the player in ODI
Player	Player name, as used on their own Wikipedia article. Also shows if they are team's designated captain or vice-captain.
Date of Birth	Date of birth, and age as of 5 October 2023.
ODIs	The number of One Day Internationals played prior to 5 October 2023. (Note: This figure is inclusive of appearances for current national team, a previous national team, ACA African XI, ACC Asian XI, and the ICC World XI.)
Role	Bowler, batter, all-rounder or wicket-keeper
Batting	Hand they bat with
Bowling style	Type(s) of bowling employed
List A or domestic team	Either List A team, or domestic one-day team if the country's one-day matches do not have List A status.

== Afghanistan ==
Afghanistan announced their squad on 13 September 2023. Fareed Ahmad, Sharafuddin Ashraf and Gulbadin Naib named as reserve players.

Coach: (England) Jonathan Trott

S/N	Player	Date of birth (age)	ODIs	Role	Batting	Bowling style	List A or domestic team
50	Hashmatullah Shahidi (c)	4 November 1994 (aged 28)	64	Batsman	Left	Right-arm off break	Band-e-Amir Region
15	Noor Ahmad	3 January 2005 (aged 18)	3	Bowler	Right	Left-arm unorthodox spin	Mis Ainak Knights
46	Ikram Alikhil	28 November 2000 (aged 22)	14	Wicket-keeper	Left	–	Speenghar Tigers
5	Fazalhaq Farooqi	22 September 2000 (aged 23)	21	Bowler	Right	Left-arm fast-medium	Kabul Eagles
21	Rahmanullah Gurbaz (wk)	28 November 2001 (aged 21)	26	Wicket-keeper	Right	–	Kabul Eagles
76	Riaz Hassan	7 November 2002 (aged 20)	5	Batsman	Right	–	Speenghar Tigers
19	Rashid Khan	20 September 1998 (aged 25)	94	All-rounder	Right	Right-arm leg spin	Speenghar Tigers
7	Mohammad Nabi	1 January 1985 (aged 38)	147	All-rounder	Right	Right-arm off spin	Band-e-Amir Dragons
9	Azmatullah Omarzai	24 March 2000 (aged 23)	13	All-rounder	Right	Right-arm medium-fast	Mis Ainak Knights
62	Abdul Rahman	22 November 2001 (aged 21)	3	Bowler	Right	Right-arm medium-fast	Band-e-Amir Dragons
8	Rahmat Shah	6 July 1993 (aged 30)	97	Batsman	Right	Right-arm leg break	Mis Ainak Knights
78	Naveen-ul-Haq	23 September 1999 (aged 24)	7	Bowler	Right	Right-arm medium-fast	Kabul Eagles
88	Mujeeb Ur Rahman	28 March 2001 (aged 22)	66	Bowler	Right	Right-arm off break	Speenghar Tigers
18	Ibrahim Zadran	12 December 2001 (aged 21)	17	Batsman	Right	Right-arm medium-fast	Boost Defenders
1	Najibullah Zadran	18 February 1993 (aged 30)	90	Batsman	Left	Right-arm off break	Boost Defenders

== Australia ==
Australia announced their squad on 6 September 2023. On 28 September 2023, Ashton Agar was ruled out due to injury and was replaced by Marnus Labuschagne.

Coach: (Australia) Andrew McDonald

S/N	Player	Date of birth (age)	ODIs	Role	Batting	Bowling style	List A or domestic team
30	Pat Cummins (c)	8 May 1993 (aged 30)	77	Bowler	Right	Right-arm fast	New South Wales
77	Sean Abbott	29 February 1992 (aged 31)	17	Bowler	Right	Right-arm fast-medium	New South Wales
4	Alex Carey (wk)	27 August 1991 (aged 32)	71	Wicket-keeper	Left	–	South Australia
42	Cameron Green	3 June 1999 (aged 24)	20	All-rounder	Right	Right-arm fast-medium	Western Australia
38	Josh Hazlewood	8 January 1991 (aged 32)	74	Bowler	Left	Right-arm fast-medium	New South Wales
62	Travis Head	29 December 1993 (aged 29)	58	Batsman	Left	Right-arm off-break	South Australia
48	Josh Inglis (wk)	10 June 1995 (aged 28)	8	Wicket-keeper	Right	–	Western Australia
33	Marnus Labuschagne	22 May 1994 (aged 29)	38	All-rounder	Right	Right-arm leg spin	Queensland
8	Mitchell Marsh	20 October 1991 (aged 31)	79	All-rounder	Right	Right-arm fast-medium	Western Australia
32	Glenn Maxwell	14 October 1988 (aged 34)	129	All-rounder	Right	Right-arm off-break	Victoria
49	Steve Smith	2 June 1989 (aged 34)	145	Batsman	Right	Right-arm leg spin	New South Wales
56	Mitchell Starc	30 January 1990 (aged 33)	111	Bowler	Left	Left-arm fast	New South Wales
17	Marcus Stoinis	16 August 1989 (aged 34)	64	All-rounder	Right	Right-arm fast-medium	Western Australia
31	David Warner	27 October 1986 (aged 36)	150	Batsman	Left	Right-arm leg-break	New South Wales
88	Adam Zampa	31 March 1992 (aged 31)	85	Bowler	Right	Right-arm leg-break	New South Wales
46	~~Ashton Agar~~	14 October 1993 (aged 29)	22	All-rounder	Left	Slow left-arm orthodox	Western Australia

== Bangladesh ==
Bangladesh announced their squad on 26 September 2023. On 7 November 2023, Shakib Al Hasan was ruled out due to injury and was replaced by Anamul Haque.

Coach: (Sri Lanka) Chandika Hathurusingha

S/N	Player	Date of birth (age)	ODIs	Role	Batting	Bowling style	List A or domestic team
99	Najmul Hossain Shanto (vc)	25 August 1998 (aged 25)	30	Batsman	Left	Right-arm off spin	Kalabagan
10	Nasum Ahmed	5 December 1994 (aged 28)	12	Bowler	Left	Left-arm orthodox spin	Uttara Sporting Club
3	Taskin Ahmed	5 April 1995 (aged 28)	63	Bowler	Left	Right-arm fast	Abahani Limited
16	Litton Das	13 October 1994 (aged 28)	77	Wicket-keeper	Right	Right-arm off spin	Mohammedan Sporting
66	Anamul Haque	16 December 1992 (aged 30)	38	Wicket-keeper	Right	Right-arm medium-fast	Prime Bank
41	Tanzim Hasan Sakib	20 October 2002 (aged 20)	2	Bowler	Right	Right-arm medium-fast	BKSP
97	Tanzid Hasan	1 December 2000 (aged 22)	5	Batsman	Left	–	Kalabagan
77	Towhid Hridoy	4 December 2000 (aged 22)	17	Batsman	Right	Right-arm off spin	Shinepukur
55	Mahedi Hasan	12 December 1994 (aged 28)	8	All-rounder	Right	Right-arm off spin	Gazi Group Cricketers
53	Mehidy Hasan	25 October 1997 (aged 25)	82	All-rounder	Right	Right-arm off spin	Kalabagan
47	Shoriful Islam	3 June 2001 (aged 22)	22	Bowler	Left	Left-arm medium-fast	Prime Bank
30	Mahmudullah	4 February 1986 (aged 37)	221	Batsman	Right	Right-arm off spin	Abahani Limited
91	Hasan Mahmud	12 October 1999 (aged 23)	18	Bowler	Right	Right-arm fast-medium	KSKS
15	Mushfiqur Rahim (wk)	9 May 1987 (aged 36)	256	Wicket-keeper	Right	Right-arm medium	Legends of Rupganj
90	Mustafizur Rahman	6 September 1995 (aged 28)	93	Bowler	Left	Left-arm fast-medium	Abahani Limited
75	Shakib Al Hasan (c)	24 March 1987 (aged 36)	240	All-rounder	Left	Slow left-arm orthodox	Abahani Limited

== England ==
England named their 15-man squad on 17 September 2023. On 23 October 2023, Reece Topley was ruled out due to an injury and was replaced by Brydon Carse.

Coach: (Australia) Matthew Mott

S/N	Player	Date of birth (age)	ODIs	Role	Batting	Bowling style	List A or domestic team
63	Jos Buttler (c, wk)	8 September 1990 (aged 33)	169	Wicket-keeper	Right	—	Lancashire
18	Moeen Ali (vc)	7 June 1987 (aged 36)	132	All-rounder	Left	Right-arm off spin	Warwickshire
37	Gus Atkinson	19 January 1998 (aged 25)	3	Bowler	Right	Right-arm fast	Surrey
51	Jonny Bairstow	26 September 1989 (aged 34)	98	Wicket-keeper	Right	—	Yorkshire
88	Harry Brook	22 February 1999 (aged 24)	6	Batsman	Right	Right-arm medium	Yorkshire
92	Brydon Carse	31 July 1995 (aged 28)	12	Bowler	Right	Right-arm fast	Durham
58	Sam Curran	3 June 1998 (aged 25)	26	Bowler	Left	Left-arm fast-medium	Surrey
23	Liam Livingstone	4 August 1993 (aged 30)	16	Batsman	Right	Right-arm leg spin	Lancashire
29	Dawid Malan	3 September 1987 (aged 36)	21	Batsman	Left	Right-arm leg spin	Yorkshire
95	Adil Rashid	17 February 1988 (aged 35)	126	Bowler	Right	Right-arm leg spin	Yorkshire
66	Joe Root	30 December 1990 (aged 32)	162	Batsman	Right	Right-arm off spin	Yorkshire
55	Ben Stokes	4 June 1991 (aged 32)	108	All-rounder	Left	Right-arm fast-medium	Durham
15	David Willey	28 February 1990 (aged 33)	67	All-rounder	Left	Left-arm fast-medium	Northamptonshire
19	Chris Woakes	2 March 1989 (aged 34)	114	All-rounder	Right	Right-arm fast-medium	Warwickshire
33	Mark Wood	11 January 1990 (aged 33)	59	Bowler	Right	Right-arm fast	Durham
38	~~Reece Topley~~	21 February 1994 (aged 29)	26	Bowler	Right	Left-arm fast medium	Surrey

== India ==
India announced their squad on 5 September 2023. On 28 September 2023, Axar Patel was ruled out due to injury and was replaced by Ravichandran Ashwin. On 4 November 2023, Hardik Pandya was ruled out due to ankle injury and was replaced by Prasidh Krishna.

Coach: (India) Rahul Dravid

S/N	Player	Date of birth (age)	ODIs	Role	Batting	Bowling style	List A or domestic team
45	Rohit Sharma (c)	30 April 1987 (aged 36)	251	Batsman	Right	Right-arm off spin	Mumbai
99	Ravichandran Ashwin	17 September 1986 (aged 37)	115	All-rounder	Right	Right-arm off spin	Tamil Nadu
93	Jasprit Bumrah	6 December 1993 (aged 29)	78	Bowler	Right	Right-arm fast	Gujarat
77	Shubman Gill	8 September 1999 (aged 24)	35	Batsman	Right	Right-arm off spin	Punjab
96	Shreyas Iyer	6 December 1994 (aged 28)	47	Batsman	Right	Right-arm leg spin	Mumbai
8	Ravindra Jadeja	6 December 1988 (aged 34)	186	All-rounder	Left	Slow left-arm orthodox	Saurashtra
32	Ishan Kishan (wk)	18 July 1998 (aged 25)	25	Wicket-keeper	Left	–	Jharkhand
18	Virat Kohli	5 November 1988 (aged 34)	281	Batsman	Right	Right-arm medium	Delhi
24	Prasidh Krishna	19 February 1996 (aged 27)	17	Bowler	Right	Right-arm fast-medium	Karnataka
1	K. L. Rahul (vc, wk)	18 April 1992 (aged 31)	61	Wicket keeper	Right	Right-arm medium	Karnataka
11	Mohammed Shami	3 September 1990 (aged 33)	94	Bowler	Right	Right-arm fast	Bengal
73	Mohammed Siraj	13 March 1994 (aged 29)	30	Bowler	Right	Right-arm fast	Hyderabad
54	Shardul Thakur	16 December 1991 (aged 31)	54	All-rounder	Right	Right arm medium	Mumbai
23	Kuldeep Yadav	11 December 1994 (aged 28)	89	Bowler	Right	Left-arm unorthodox spin	Uttar Pradesh
63	Suryakumar Yadav	14 September 1990 (aged 33)	30	Batsman	Right	Right-arm off break	Mumbai
20	~~Axar Patel~~	20 January 1994 (aged 29)	54	All-rounder	Left	Slow left-arm orthodox	Gujarat
33	~~Hardik Pandya~~	11 October 1993 (aged 29)	82	All-rounder	Right	Right arm medium-fast	Baroda

== Netherlands ==
The Netherlands announced their squad on 7 September 2023. Noah Croes and Kyle Klein were named as travelling reserves in the squad. On 9 November 2023, Ryan Klein was ruled out due to lower back injury and was replaced by Noah Croes.

Coach: (South Africa) Ryan Cook

S/N	Player	Date of birth (age)	ODIs	Role	Batting	Bowling style	List A or domestic team
35	Scott Edwards (c, wk)	23 August 1996 (aged 27)	38	Wicket-keeper	Right	–	VOC Rotterdam
48	Colin Ackermann	4 April 1991 (aged 32)	7	Batsman	Right	Right-arm off spin	Leicestershire
18	Shariz Ahmad	21 April 2003 (aged 20)	11	Bowler	Left	Right-arm leg spin	Voorburg
34	Wesley Barresi	3 May 1984 (aged 39)	45	Batsman	Right	Right-arm off spin	HBS Craeyenhout
5	Bas de Leede	15 November 1999 (aged 23)	30	All-rounder	Right	Right-arm fast medium	Durham
36	Noah Croes	13 December 1999 (aged 23)	1	Batsman	Right	–	Voorburg
88	Aryan Dutt	12 May 2003 (aged 20)	25	Bowler	Right	Right-arm off spin	VRA Amsterdam
72	Sybrand Engelbrecht	15 September 1988 (aged 35)	0	Batsman	Right	Right-arm off spin	Voorburg
25	Teja Nidamanuru	22 August 1994 (aged 29)	20	Batsman	Right	Right-arm off spin	VRA Amsterdam
4	Max O'Dowd	4 March 1994 (aged 29)	25	Batsman	Left	Right-arm leg spin	VOC Rotterdam
7	Vikramjit Singh	9 January 2003 (aged 20)	33	Batsman	Right	Right-arm off spin	VRA Amsterdam
17	Logan van Beek	7 September 1990 (aged 33)	25	All-rounder	Right	Right-arm medium-fast	Voorburg
47	Paul van Meekeren	15 January 1993 (aged 30)	13	Bowler	Right	Right-arm fast-medium	Gloucestershire
52	Roelof van der Merwe	31 December 1984 (aged 38)	16	All-rounder	Right	Slow left-arm orthodox	Somerset
66	Saqib Zulfiqar	28 March 1997 (aged 26)	13	All-rounder	Right	Right-arm leg spin	Punjab Rotterdam
15	~~Ryan Klein~~	15 June 1997 (aged 26)	12	Bowler	Right	Right-arm medium-fast	Voorburg

== New Zealand ==
New Zealand announced their squad on 11 September 2023. On 3 November 2023, Matt Henry was ruled out due to hamstring strain and was replaced by Kyle Jamieson.

Coach: (New Zealand) Gary Stead

S/N	Player	Date of birth (age)	ODIs	Role	Batting	Bowling style	List A or domestic team
22	Kane Williamson (c)	8 August 1990 (aged 33)	161	Batsman	Right	Right-arm off spin	Northern Districts
48	Tom Latham (vc, wk)	2 April 1992 (aged 31)	134	Wicket-keeper	Right	Right-arm medium	Canterbury
18	Trent Boult	22 July 1989 (aged 34)	104	Bowler	Right	Left-arm fast-medium	Northern Districts
80	Mark Chapman	27 June 1994 (aged 29)	12	Batsman	Left	Slow left-arm orthodox	Auckland
88	Devon Conway	8 July 1991 (aged 32)	22	Wicket-keeper	Left	Right-arm medium	Wellington
69	Lockie Ferguson	13 June 1991 (aged 32)	58	Bowler	Right	Right-arm fast	Auckland
12	Kyle Jamieson	30 December 1994 (aged 28)	13	Bowler	Right	Right-arm fast-medium	Auckland
75	Daryl Mitchell	20 May 1991 (aged 32)	29	All-rounder	Right	Right-arm medium	Canterbury
50	James Neesham	17 September 1990 (aged 33)	73	All-rounder	Left	Right-arm medium-fast	Wellington
23	Glenn Phillips	6 December 1996 (aged 26)	20	Batsman	Right	Right-arm off break	Otago
8	Rachin Ravindra	18 November 1999 (aged 23)	12	All-rounder	Left	Slow left-arm orthodox	Wellington
74	Mitchell Santner	5 February 1992 (aged 31)	94	All-rounder	Left	Left-arm orthodox	Northern Districts
61	Ish Sodhi	31 October 1992 (aged 30)	49	Bowler	Right	Right-arm leg spin	Northern Districts
38	Tim Southee	11 December 1988 (aged 34)	157	Bowler	Right	Right-arm fast-medium	Northern Districts
32	Will Young	22 November 1992 (aged 30)	22	Batsman	Right	Right-arm off break	Central Districts
21	~~Matt Henry~~	14 December 1991 (aged 31)	75	Bowler	Right	Right-arm fast-medium	Canterbury

== Pakistan ==
Pakistan announced their squad on 22 September 2023. Abrar Ahmed, Mohammad Haris and Zaman Khan were named as reserve players.

Coach: (New Zealand) Grant Bradburn

S/N	Player	Date of birth (age)	ODIs	Role	Batting	Bowling style	List A or domestic team
56	Babar Azam (c)	15 October 1994 (aged 28)	108	Batsman	Right	Right-arm off spin	Islamabad
7	Shadab Khan (vc)	4 October 1998 (aged 25)	64	All-rounder	Right	Right-arm leg spin	Khyber Pakhtunkhwa
10	Shaheen Afridi	6 April 2000 (aged 23)	44	Bowler	Left	Left-arm fast	Balochistan
95	Ifitkhar Ahmed	3 September 1990 (aged 33)	19	Batsman	Right	Right-arm off spin	Khyber Pakhtunkhwa
32	Hasan Ali	7 February 1994 (aged 29)	60	Bowler	Right	Right-arm fast-medium	Central Punjab
67	Salman Ali Agha	23 November 1993 (aged 29)	18	Batsman	Right	Right-arm off spin	Southern Punjab
24	Usama Mir	23 December 1995 (aged 27)	8	Bowler	Right	Right-arm leg spin	Central Punjab
21	Mohammad Nawaz	21 March 1994 (aged 29)	32	All-rounder	Left	Slow left-arm orthodox	Northern
97	Haris Rauf	7 November 1993 (aged 29)	28	Bowler	Right	Right-arm fast	Balochistan
16	Mohammad Rizwan (wk)	1 June 1992 (aged 31)	65	Wicket-keeper	Right	Right-arm medium	Khyber Pakhtunkhwa
57	Abdullah Shafique	23 November 1999 (aged 23)	4	Batsman	Right	Right-arm off spin	Balochistan
59	Saud Shakeel	5 September 1995 (aged 28)	6	Batsman	Left	Left-arm orthodox spin	Sindh
26	Imam-ul-Haq	22 December 1995 (aged 27)	66	Batsman	Left	Right-arm leg spin	Balochistan
74	Mohammad Wasim Jr.	25 August 2001 (aged 22)	16	Bowler	Right	Right-arm fast-medium	Khyber Pakhtunkhwa
39	Fakhar Zaman	10 April 1990 (aged 33)	78	Batsman	Left	Slow left-arm orthodox	Khyber Pakhtunkhwa

== South Africa ==
South Africa announced their squad on 5 September 2023. On 21 September 2023, Anrich Nortje and Sisanda Magala were ruled out due to injuries and were replaced by Andile Phehlukwayo and Lizaad Williams.

Coach: (South Africa) Rob Walter

S/N	Player	Date of birth (age)	ODIs	Role	Batting	Bowling style	List A or domestic team
11	Temba Bavuma (c)	17 May 1990 (aged 33)	28	Batsman	Right	Right-arm medium	Lions
16	Keshav Maharaj (vc)	7 February 1990 (aged 33)	31	Bowler	Right	Slow left-arm orthodox	Dolphins
62	Gerald Coetzee	2 October 2000 (aged 23)	6	Bowler	Right	Right-arm fast	Knights
12	Quinton de Kock (wk)	17 December 1992 (aged 30)	145	Wicket-keeper	Left	–	Titans
17	Reeza Hendricks	14 August 1989 (aged 34)	29	Batsman	Right	Right-arm off break	Lions
70	Marco Jansen	1 May 2000 (aged 23)	14	All-rounder	Right	Left-arm fast-medium	Warriors
45	Heinrich Klaasen (wk)	30 July 1991 (aged 32)	41	Wicket-keeper	Right	Right-arm off spin	Titans
4	Aiden Markram	4 October 1994 (aged 29)	55	Batsman	Right	Right-arm off spin	Titans
10	David Miller	10 June 1989 (aged 34)	160	Batsman	Left	Right-arm off spin	Dolphins
22	Lungi Ngidi	29 March 1996 (aged 27)	48	Bowler	Right	Right-arm fast-medium	Titans
23	Andile Phehlukwayo	3 March 1996 (aged 27)	76	All-rounder	Left	Right-arm medium-fast	Dolphins
25	Kagiso Rabada	25 May 1995 (aged 28)	91	Bowler	Left	Right-arm fast	Lions
26	Tabraiz Shamsi	18 February 1990 (aged 33)	46	Bowler	Right	Left-arm wrist spin	Titans
6	Lizaad Williams	1 October 1993 (aged 30)	1	Bowler	Left	Right-arm medium-fast	Titans
72	Rassie van der Dussen	7 February 1989 (aged 34)	49	Batsman	Right	Right-arm leg spin	Lions
58	~~Sisanda Magala~~	7 January 1991 (aged 32)	8	Bowler	Right	Right-arm fast-medium	Lions
20	~~Anrich Nortje~~	16 November 1993 (aged 29)	22	Bowler	Right	Right-arm fast	Warriors

== Sri Lanka ==
The Sri Lanka announced their squad on 26 September 2023. Chamika Karunaratne was named as reserved player. On 14 October 2023, Dasun Shanaka was ruled out due to injury and was replaced by Chamika Karunaratne. On 19 October 2023, Sri Lanka named Dushmantha Chameera and Angelo Mathews as travelling reserves. On 24 October 2023, Matheesha Pathirana was ruled out due to shoulder injury and was replaced by Angelo Mathews. On 29 October 2023, Lahiru Kumara was ruled out due to thigh injury and was replaced by Dushmantha Chameera.

Coach: (England) Chris Silverwood

S/N	Player	Date of birth (age)	ODIs	Role	Batting	Bowling style	List A or domestic team
13	Kusal Mendis (vc, wk)	2 February 1995 (aged 28)	112	Wicket-keeper	Right	Right-arm leg spin	Bloomfield
72	Charith Asalanka	29 June 1997 (aged 26)	41	Batsman	Left	Right-arm off spin	Galle
5	Dushmantha Chameera	11 January 1992 (aged 31)	44	Bowler	Right	Right-arm fast	Nondescripts
75	Dhananjaya de Silva	6 September 1991 (aged 32)	48	Batsman	Left	Right-arm medium	Tamil Union
34	Dushan Hemantha	24 May 1994 (aged 29)	3	All-rounder	Right	Right-arm leg spin	Badureliya
29	Chamika Karunaratne	29 May 1996 (aged 27)	23	All-rounder	Right	Right-arm medium-fast	Nondescripts
16	Dimuth Karunaratne	21 April 1988 (aged 35)	48	All-rounder	Right	Right-arm off spin	Sinhalese
98	Dilshan Madushanka	18 September 2000 (aged 23)	6	Bowler	Right	Left-arm fast-medium	Colts
69	Angelo Mathews	2 June 1987 (aged 36)	221	All-rounder	Right	Right-arm medium	Colts
18	Pathum Nissanka	18 May 1998 (aged 25)	40	Batsman	Right	–	Nondescripts
55	Kusal Perera	17 August 1990 (aged 33)	109	Wicket-keeper	Left	Left-arm medium	Colts
65	Kasun Rajitha	1 June 1993 (aged 30)	28	Bowler	Right	Right-arm medium-fast	Badureliya
23	Sadeera Samarawickrama	30 June 1995 (aged 28)	23	Wicket-keeper	Right	–	Tamil Union
61	Maheesh Theekshana	1 August 2000 (aged 23)	27	Bowler	Right	Right-arm off spin	Colts
1	Dunith Wellalage	9 January 2003 (aged 20)	15	All-rounder	Left	Slow left-arm orthodox	Colts
3	~~Dasun Shanaka~~ (c)	9 September 1991 (aged 32)	67	All-rounder	Right	Right-arm medium	Sinhalese
81	~~Matheesha Pathirana~~	18 December 2002 (aged 20)	10	Bowler	Right	Right-arm fast	Nondescripts
8	~~Lahiru Kumara~~	13 February 1997 (aged 26)	26	Bowler	Left	Right-arm fast	Nondescripts

== Statistics ==
=== ODI caps ===
This chart shows the total number of One Day International (ODI) caps for each team competing in the 2023 ICC Cricket World Cup. The caps only include those who were in the original 15 member squad submitted to the International Cricket Council (ICC) on 28 September 2023. The caps include all appearances in ODIs until 5 October 2023, the first day of the World Cup.

Fewest caps (Note: The table only includes those who were in the 15 member squad at the start of the tournament. Caps include all appearances in ODIs before 5 October 2023, the first day of the World Cup.)		Most caps	
(Netherlands) Sybrand Engelbrecht	0	(India) Virat Kohli	281
(South Africa) Lizaad Williams	1	(Bangladesh) Mushfiqur Rahim	255
(Bangladesh) Tanzim Hasan Sakib	2	(India) Rohit Sharma	251
(Afghanistan) Abdul Rahman (Afghanistan) Noor Ahmad (England) Gus Atkinson (South Africa) Gerald Coetzee (Sri Lanka) Dushan Hemantha	3	(Bangladesh) Shakib Al Hasan	240
(Afghanistan) Abdul Rahman (Afghanistan) Noor Ahmad (England) Gus Atkinson (South Africa) Gerald Coetzee (Sri Lanka) Dushan Hemantha	3	(Bangladesh) Mahmudullah	221

=== Age ===
Youngest players (Note: The table only includes those who were in the 15 member squad at the start of the tournament. Age as of 5 October 2023, the first day of the World Cup.)		Oldest players	
(Afghanistan) Noor Ahmad	18 years, 275 days	(Netherlands) Wesley Barresi	39 years, 155 days
(Netherlands) Aryan Dutt	20 years, 146 days	(Netherlands) Roelof van der Merwe	38 years, 278 days (Note: Includes 13 appearances for the South Africa.)
(Netherlands) Vikramjit Singh	20 years, 269 days	(Afghanistan) Mohammad Nabi	38 years, 277 days
(Sri Lanka) Dunith Wellalage	20 years, 269 days	(Bangladesh) Mahmudullah	37 years, 243 days
(Sri Lanka) Matheesha Pathirana	20 years, 291 days	(India) Rohit Sharma	37 years, 18 days
