= 2024 Oman Tri-Nation Series =

Eighth tri-nation series round in 2024-26 WCL2

The 2024 Oman Tri-Nation Series was the eighth round of the 2024–2026 Cricket World Cup League 2 cricket tournament that took place in Oman in November 2024. The tri-nation series was contested by the men's national teams of Netherlands, Oman and United Arab Emirates. The matches were played as One Day International (ODI) fixtures.

Following the ODI series, Oman and Netherlands played a three-match Twenty20 International (T20I) series against each other. Netherlands won the series 2–1.

== League 2 series ==
2024 Oman Tri-Nation Series
- Part of 2024–2026 Cricket World Cup League 2
- Date: 1–11 November 2024
- Location: Oman
Teams
Netherlands	Oman	United Arab Emirates
Captains
Scott Edwards	Jatinder Singh	Rahul Chopra
Most runs
Bas de Leede (135)	Jatinder Singh (130)	Rahul Chopra (121)
Most wickets
Roelof van der Merwe (9)	Shakeel Ahmed (13)	Ali Naseer (6); Junaid Siddique (6)

=== Squads ===
Netherlands	Oman	United Arab Emirates
Scott Edwards (c, wk); Colin Ackermann; Shariz Ahmad; Noah Croes; Bas de Leede; Aryan Dutt; Vivian Kingma; Kyle Klein; Ryan Klein; Michael Levitt; Teja Nidamanuru; Max O'Dowd; Vikramjit Singh; Timm van der Gugten; Roelof van der Merwe; Paul van Meekeren	Jatinder Singh (c, wk); Shakeel Ahmed; Wasim Ali; Munis Ansari; Sandeep Goud; Aamir Kaleem; Sufyan Mehmood; Hammad Mirza (wk); Mohammad Nadeem; Ashish Odedara; Jay Odedra; Muzahir Raza; Samay Shrivastava; Bukkapatnam Siddharth; Karan Sonavale	Rahul Chopra (c, wk); Vriitya Aravind (wk); Rahul Bhatia; Muhammad Farooq; Basil Hameed; Muhammad Jawadullah; Aayan Afzal Khan; Ali Naseer; Dhruv Parashar; Junaid Siddique; Omid Shafi Rahman; Aryansh Sharma (wk); Vishnu Sukumaran; Tanish Suri (wk); Muhammad Waseem

Teja Nidamanuru was added to Netherlands' squad before the final match of the series.

=== Fixtures ===
==== 1st ODI ====
1 November 2024
10:00
Scorecard

United Arab Emirates; 128 (41.3 overs)	v	Oman; 129/4 (43.4 overs)
Muhammad Waseem 44 (56); Samay Shrivastava 4/25 (8.3 overs)		Ashish Odedara 54* (127); Dhruv Parashar 2/16 (10 overs)

Oman won by 6 wickets
Oman Cricket Academy Ground Turf 1, Al Amarat
Umpires: Rahul Asher (Oma) and Rashid Riaz (Pak)
Player of the match: Ashish Odedara (Oma)

- Oman won the toss and elected to field.
- Hammad Mirza, Ashish Odedara, Muzahir Raza, Samay Shrivastava (Oma) and Dhruv Parashar (UAE) all made their ODI debuts.
- Rahul Chopra captained United Arab Emirates in ODIs for the first time.

==== 2nd ODI ====
3 November 2024
10:00
Scorecard

United Arab Emirates; 240/8 (50 overs)	v	Netherlands; 214 (47.4 overs)
Rahul Chopra 78 (67); Roelof van der Merwe 2/29 (9 overs)		Bas de Leede 66 (86); Ali Naseer 4/26 (10 overs)

United Arab Emirates won by 26 runs
Oman Cricket Academy Ground Turf 1, Al Amarat
Umpires: Rahul Asher (Oma) and Vinod Babu (Oma)
Player of the match: Rahul Chopra (UAE)

- Netherlands won the toss and elected to field.

==== 3rd ODI ====
5 November 2024
10:00
Scorecard

Netherlands; 132 (40.2 overs)	v	Oman; 133/2 (34.1 overs)
Bas de Leede 51 (89); Shakeel Ahmed 4/26 (10 overs)		Jatinder Singh 58 (95); Aryan Dutt 1/35 (10 overs)

Oman won by 8 wickets
Oman Cricket Academy Ground Turf 1, Al Amarat
Umpires: Vinod Babu (Oma) and Rashid Riaz (Pak)
Player of the match: Shakeel Ahmed (Oma)

- Oman won the toss and elected to field.

==== 4th ODI ====
7 November 2024
10:00
Scorecard

United Arab Emirates; 78 (25.3 overs)	v	Oman; 79/6 (24.1 overs)
Ali Naseer 21 (25); Shakeel Ahmed 5/23 (10 overs)		Aamir Kaleem 32 (43); Basil Hameed 3/17 (6 overs)

Oman won by 4 wickets
Oman Cricket Academy Ground Turf 1, Al Amarat
Umpires: Rahul Asher (Oma) and Rashid Riaz (Pak)
Player of the match: Shakeel Ahmed (Oma)

- Oman won the toss and elected to field.
- Shakeel Ahmed (Oma) took his first five-wicket haul in ODIs.

==== 5th ODI ====
9 November 2024
10:00
Scorecard

Netherlands; 241/8 (50 overs)	v	United Arab Emirates; 174 (45.2 overs)
Max O'Dowd 69 (95); Junaid Siddique 3/31 (10 overs)		Ali Naseer 45 (39); Roelof van der Merwe 3/14 (7.2 overs)

Netherlands won by 67 runs
Oman Cricket Academy Ground Turf 1, Al Amarat
Umpires: Rahul Asher (Oma) and Vinod Babu (Oma)
Player of the match: Max O'Dowd (Ned)

- United Arab Emirates won the toss and elected to field.

==== 6th ODI ====
11 November 2024
10:00
Scorecard

Oman; 155 (44.2 overs)	v	Netherlands; 154 (45.3 overs)
Jatinder Singh 59 (89); Colin Ackermann 4/22 (9 overs)		Teja Nidamanuru 34 (43); Aamir Kaleem 4/24 (10 overs)

Oman won by 1 run
Oman Cricket Academy Ground Turf 1, Al Amarat
Umpires: Vinod Babu (Oma) and Rashid Riaz (Pak)
Player of the match: Aamir Kaleem (Oma)

- Netherlands won the toss and elected to field.
- Bukkapatnam Siddharth (Oma) made his ODI debut.

== Oman v Netherlands T20I series ==
Netherlands men's cricket team in Oman in 2024–25
	Oman	Netherlands
- Dates: 13 – 16 November 2024
Captains	Jatinder Singh	Scott Edwards

Twenty20 International series
- Results: Netherlands won the 3-match series 2–1
Most runs	Hammad Mirza (94)	Scott Edwards (115)
Most wickets	Shakeel Ahmed (5); Muzahir Raza (5)	Kyle Klein (4); Roelof van der Merwe (4); Timm van der Gugten (4); Colin Ackermann (4)

=== Squads ===
Oman	Netherlands
Jatinder Singh (c, wk); Shakeel Ahmed; Wasim Ali; Sandeep Goud; Aamir Kaleem; Mehran Khan; Sufyan Mehmood; Hammad Mirza (wk); Mohammad Nadeem; Ashish Odedara; Jay Odedra; Muzahir Raza; Samay Shrivastava; Bukkapatnam Siddharth	Scott Edwards (c, wk); Colin Ackermann; Shariz Ahmad; Noah Croes; Bas de Leede; Aryan Dutt; Vivian Kingma; Kyle Klein; ~~Ryan Klein~~; Michael Levitt; Teja Nidamanuru; Max O'Dowd; Vikramjit Singh; Timm van der Gugten; Roelof van der Merwe; Paul van Meekeren

On 12 November, Ryan Klein was ruled out of the T20I series due to injury.

=== Fixtures ===
==== 1st T20I ====
13 November 2024
14:00
Scorecard

Netherlands; 138/7 (20 overs)	v	Oman; 139/7 (19.1 overs)
Colin Ackermann 34 (31); Muzahir Raza 3/42 (4 overs)		Hammad Mirza 62* (42); Roelof van der Merwe 3/15 (4 overs)

Oman won by 3 wickets
Oman Cricket Academy Ground Turf 1, Al Amarat
Umpires: Rahul Asher (Oma) and Vinod Babu (Oma)
Player of the match: Hammad Mirza (Oma)

- Oman won the toss and elected to field.
- Ashish Odedara and Muzahir Raza (Oma) both made their T20I debuts.

==== 2nd T20I ====
14 November 2024
18:00 (N)
Scorecard

Netherlands; 185/6 (20 overs)	v	Oman; 135/7 (20 overs)
Scott Edwards 99 (55); Jay Odedra 2/13 (2 overs)		Aamir Kaleem 36 (22); Colin Ackermann 3/15 (4 overs)

Netherlands won by 50 runs
Oman Cricket Academy Ground Turf 1, Al Amarat
Umpires: Vinod Babu (Oma) and Harikrishna Pillai (Oma)
Player of the match: Scott Edwards (Ned)

- Oman won the toss and elected to field.

==== 3rd T20I ====
16 November 2024
14:00
Scorecard

Netherlands; 147/9 (20 overs)	v	Oman; 118/9 (20 overs)
Max O'Dowd 66 (55); Shakeel Ahmed 3/24 (4 overs)		Shakeel Ahmed 45 (33); Kyle Klein 4/16 (4 overs)

Netherlands won by 29 runs
Oman Cricket Academy Ground Turf 1, Al Amarat
Umpires: Rahul Asher (Oma) and Harikrishna Pillai (Oma)
Player of the match: Kyle Klein (Ned)

- Oman won the toss and elected to field.
- Max O'Dowd (Ned) scored his 2,000th run in T20Is.
