= 2025 Scotland Tri-Nation Series =

Thirteenth tri-nation series round in 2024-26 WCL2

- Part of 2024–2026 Cricket World Cup League 2
- Date: 2 – 12 June 2025
- Location: Scotland
Teams
Nepal	Netherlands	Scotland
Captains
Rohit Paudel	Scott Edwards (Note: Max O'Dowd captained Netherlands in their second match of the series.)	Richie Berrington (Note: Matthew Cross captained Scotland in their fourth match of the series.)
Most runs
Aarif Sheikh (208)	Max O'Dowd (189)	George Munsey (229)
Most wickets
Karan KC (7)	Michael Levitt (7)	Brandon McMullen (7); Safyaan Sharif (7)

The 2025 Scotland Tri-Nation Series was the thirteenth round of the 2024–2026 Cricket World Cup League 2 cricket tournament that took place in Scotland in June 2025. It was a tri-nation series contested by the men's national teams of the Netherlands, Nepal and Scotland. The matches were played as One Day International (ODI) fixtures.

After the League 2 series, the participating teams also played a tri-nation Twenty20 International (T20I) series. Scotland won the series on net run rate after all three teams finished with equal points.

== Warm-up matches ==
Before the start of the League 2 series, the Nepal men's team toured England and Scotland in May 2025 to play various warm-up matches.

Nepal tour matches

16 May 2025
11:00
Scorecard

Newport; 212 (42.3 overs)	v	Nepal XI; 214/7 (37.5 overs)
William Tripcony 118 (124); Kushal Bhurtel 4/30 (9 overs)		Gulsan Jha 80 (72); Alfie Cutmore 3/44 (8 overs)

Nepal XI won by 3 wickets
Spytty Park, Newport

- Newport won the toss and elected to bat.

19 May 2025
11:00
Scorecard

Nepal XI; 335/4 (50 overs)	v	MCC; 212 (35.3 overs)
Dipendra Singh Airee 110* (67); Jacob Garlick 2/76 (9 overs)		Travis Norris 56 (68); Sompal Kami 3/24 (5 overs)

Nepal XI won by 123 runs
The Park, Herefordshire
Umpires: Dave Gower (Eng) and Mansoor Qureshi (Eng)

- MCC won the toss and elected to field.

22 May 2025
11:30
Scorecard

Nepal; 194/6 (20 overs)	v	Gloucestershire 2nd XI; 121 (17.3 overs)
Kushal Bhurtel 46 (30); David Payne 2/30 (4 overs)		James Matravers 37 (21); Basir Ahamad 2/8 (1 over)

Nepal won by 73 runs
The Common, Rockhampton
Umpires: Mansoor Qureshi (Eng) and Darren Turl (Eng)

- Toss uncostested.

22 May 2025
15:00
Scorecard

Gloucestershire 2nd XI; 168/6 (20 overs)	v	Nepal; 171/5 (14.2 overs)
Daaryoush Ahmed 52 (29); Sompal Kami 3/38 (4 overs)		Aasif Sheikh 84* (42); Oscar Moore 2/28 (2 overs)

Nepal won by 5 wickets
The Common, Rockhampton
Umpires: Mansoor Qureshi (Eng) and Darren Turl (Eng)

- Toss uncontested.

26 May 2025
11:00
Scorecard

Nepal; 294/7 (50 overs)	v	Glamorgan 2nd XI; 182 (30.4 overs)
Bhim Sharki 92 (80); Ned Leonard 3/64 (10 overs)		Henry Hurle 42 (49); Kushal Bhurtel 4/19 (5 overs)

Nepal won by 50 runs (DLS method)
Spytty Park, Newport
Umpires: Jonathan Kinsey (Eng) and Nick Piper (Eng)

- Glamorgan 2nd XI won the toss and elected to field.
- Glamorgan 2nd XI were set a revised target of 233 from 34 overs due to rain.

29 May 2025
11:00
Scorecard

Scotland A 220/9 (40 overs)	v	Nepal; 118 (29.4 overs)
Christopher McBride 72 (58); Sompal Kami 4/35 (8 overs)		Aarif Sheikh 44 (56); Zainullah Ihsan 4/18 (5 overs)

Scotland A won by 102 runs
Forthill, Dundee

- Nepal won the toss and elected to field.
- The match was reduced to 40 overs per side due to rain.

31 May 2025
11:00
Scorecard

Nepal; 253/9 (45 overs)	v	Scotland A 64/3 (13 overs)
Gulsan Jha 64 (47); Ollie Davidson 2/39 (7 overs)		Lloyd Brown 30 (33); Sompal Kami 2/30 (5 overs)

No result
Forthill, Dundee

- Nepal won the toss and elected to bat.
- The match was reduced to 45 overs per side due to rain.
- No further play was possible due to rain.

== League 2 series ==
=== Squads ===
Nepal	Netherlands	Scotland
Rohit Paudel (c); Dipendra Singh Airee (vc); Basir Ahamad; Kushal Bhurtel; Rijan Dhakal; Gulsan Jha; Sompal Kami; Karan KC; Sandeep Lamichhane; Lalit Rajbanshi; Anil Sah (wk); Bhim Sharki; Aarif Sheikh; Aasif Sheikh (wk); Nandan Yadav	Scott Edwards (c, wk); Shariz Ahmad; Wesley Barresi (wk); Noah Croes (wk); Aryan Dutt; Ben Fletcher; Vivian Kingma; Kyle Klein; Michael Levitt; Zach Lion-Cachet; Teja Nidamanuru; Max O'Dowd; Vikramjit Singh; Roelof van der Merwe; Paul van Meekeren	Richie Berrington (c); Charlie Cassell; Matthew Cross (wk); Jasper Davidson; Oliver Davidson; Jack Jarvis; Mackenzie Jones; Michael Leask; Finlay McCreath; Brandon McMullen; George Munsey; Liam Naylor; Safyaan Sharif; Charlie Tear (wk); Mark Watt

=== Fixtures ===
==== 1st ODI ====
2 June 2025
11:00
Scorecard

Scotland; 296/7 (50 overs)	v	Nepal; 297/9 (49.5 overs)
Charlie Tear 80 (72); Karan KC 2/43 (10 overs)		Karan KC 65* (41); Brandon McMullen 3/47 (10 overs)

Nepal won by 1 wicket
Forthill, Dundee
Umpires: Ryan Milne (Sco) and Gazi Sohel (Ban)
Player of the match: Karan KC (Nep)

- Nepal won the toss and elected to field.

==== 2nd ODI ====
4 June 2025
11:00
Scorecard

Netherlands; 225 (49.1 overs)	v	Nepal; 226/5 (47.1 overs)
Noah Croes 48 (55); Sompal Kami 3/48 (9.1 overs)		Aarif Sheikh 78 (99); Michael Levitt 2/43 (10 overs)

Nepal won by 5 wickets
Forthill, Dundee
Umpires: Iain McDonald (Sco) and David McLean (Sco)
Player of the match: Aarif Sheikh (Nep)

- Netherlands won the toss and elected to bat.

==== 3rd ODI ====
6 June 2025
11:00
Scorecard

Scotland; 262/9 (50 overs)	v	Netherlands; 218 (45 overs)
Finlay McCreath 81 (106); Kyle Klein 3/81 (10 overs)		Michael Levitt 35 (52); Brandon McMullen 3/40 (10 overs)

Scotland won by 44 runs
Forthill, Dundee
Umpires: David McLean (Sco) and Gazi Sohel (Ban)
Player of the match: Mark Watt (Sco)

- Netherlands won the toss and elected to field.

==== 4th ODI ====
8 June 2025
11:00
Scorecard

Scotland; 323/6 (50 overs)	v	Nepal; 321 (50 overs)
Richie Berrington 102 (114); Dipendra Singh Airee 2/37 (7 overs)		Bhim Sharki 73 (85); Mackenzie Jones 3/55 (9 overs)

Scotland won by 2 runs
Forthill, Dundee
Umpires: Ryan Milne (Sco) and Gazi Sohel (Ban)
Player of the match: Michael Leask (Sco)

- Scotland won the toss and elected to bat.
- Mackenzie Jones (Sco) made his ODI debut.

==== 5th ODI ====
10 June 2025
11:00
Scorecard

Nepal; 236/9 (50 overs)	v	Netherlands; 220 (49.2 overs)
Aarif Sheikh 84 (85); Paul van Meekeren 4/58 (10 overs)		Wesley Barresi 36 (60); Nandan Yadav 3/39 (9 overs)

Nepal won by 16 runs
Forthill, Dundee
Umpires: David McLean (Sco) and Ryan Milne (Sco)
Player of the match: Aarif Sheikh (Nep)

- Netherlands won the toss and elected to field.
- Nandan Yadav (Nep) made his ODI debut.

==== 6th ODI ====
12 June 2025
11:00
Scorecard

Scotland; 369/6 (50 overs)	v	Netherlands; 374/6 (49.2 overs)
George Munsey 191 (150); Michael Levitt 2/41 (8 overs)		Max O'Dowd 158* (130); Safyaan Sharif 3/62 (9.2 overs)

Netherlands won by 4 wickets
Forthill, Dundee
Umpires: Iain McDonald (Sco) and Gazi Sohel (Ban)
Player of the match: Max O'Dowd (Ned)

- Scotland won the toss and elected to bat.
- George Munsey recorded the highest individual score for Scotland in men's ODIs.
- Max O'Dowd (Ned) scored his first century in ODIs and the highest individual score for the Netherlands in men's ODIs.

== T20I series ==
2025 Scotland T20I Tri-Nation Series
- Date: 15–20 June 2025
- Location: Scotland
- Result: Scotland won the series
Teams
Nepal	Netherlands	Scotland
Captains
Rohit Paudel	Scott Edwards	Richie Berrington (Note: Matthew Cross captained Scotland in their first two matches of the series.)
Most runs
Kushal Bhurtel (133)	Michael Levitt (232)	George Munsey (142)
Most wickets
Sandeep Lamichhane (9)	Aryan Dutt (5)	Safyaan Sharif (6)

=== Squads ===
Nepal	Netherlands	Scotland
Rohit Paudel (c); Dipendra Singh Airee (vc); Basir Ahamad; Lokesh Bam; Kushal Bhurtel; Rijan Dhakal; ~~Gulsan Jha~~; Sandeep Lamichhane; ~~Sompal Kami~~; Karan KC; Lalit Rajbanshi; Anil Sah (wk); Bhim Sharki; Aarif Sheikh; Aasif Sheikh (wk); Kiran Thagunna; Rupesh Singh; Nandan Yadav	Scott Edwards (c, wk); Noah Croes (wk); Daniel Doram; Aryan Dutt; Ben Fletcher; Vivian Kingma; Kyle Klein; Ryan Klein; Michael Levitt; Zach Lion-Cachet; Teja Nidamanuru; Max O'Dowd; Vikramjit Singh; Roelof van der Merwe; Paul van Meekeren; Saqib Zulfiqar	Richie Berrington (c); Charlie Cassell; Matthew Cross (wk); Jasper Davidson; Chris Greaves; Jack Jarvis; Mackenzie Jones; Michael Leask; ~~Gavin Main~~; Christopher McBride; Finlay McCreath; Brandon McMullen; George Munsey; Liam Naylor; Safyaan Sharif; Mark Watt

Gulsan Jha and Sompal Kami were released from Nepal's squad before the start of the series. Also before the series, Charlie Cassell replaced Gavin Main in Scotland's squad. During the series, Ryan Klein was added to Netherlands' squad.

=== Points table ===
Pos	Team	Pld	W	L	NR	Pts	NRR
1	Scotland	4	2	2	0	4	0.672
2	Nepal	4	2	2	0	4	−0.291
3	Netherlands	4	2	2	0	4	−0.385

Source: ESPNcricinfo

=== Fixtures ===
15 June 2025
15:00
Scorecard

Scotland; 160/8 (20 overs)	v	Netherlands; 121 (18.1 overs)
Finlay McCreath 40 (28); Aryan Dutt 3/17 (4 overs)		Michael Levitt 36 (30); Safyaan Sharif 2/13 (2.1 overs)

Scotland won by 39 runs
Titwood, Glasgow
Umpires: David McLean (Sco) and Ryan Milne (Sco)
Player of the match: Finlay McCreath (Sco)

- Netherlands won the toss and elected to field.
- Christopher McBride, Finlay McCreath and Liam Naylor (Sco) all made their T20I debuts.
- This was the first men's T20I to be played at this venue.

16 June 2025
15:00
Scorecard

Netherlands; 152/7 (20 overs)	v	Nepal; 152/8 (20 overs)
Teja Nidamanuru 35 (37); Sandeep Lamichhane 3/18 (4 overs)		Rohit Paudel 48 (35); Daniel Doram 3/14 (4 overs)

Match tied
(Netherlands won the 3rd Super Over)
Titwood, Glasgow
Umpires: Iain McDonald (Sco) and Ryan Milne (Sco)
Player of the match: Zach Lion-Cachet (Ned)

- Nepal won the toss and elected to field.
- Ben Fletcher (Ned), Rupesh Singh and Kiran Thagunna (Nep) all made their T20I debuts.
- Super Over 1: Nepal 19/1, Netherlands 19/0
- Super Over 2: Netherlands 17/1, Nepal 17/0
- Super Over 3: Nepal 0/2, Netherlands 6/0
- This was the first professional men's match (T20 or List A) to go into a third Super Over.

17 June 2025
15:00
Scorecard

Scotland; 97 (19.4 overs)	v	Nepal; 98/8 (19.5 overs)
Michael Leask 46 (46); Sandeep Lamichhane 4/11 (4 overs)		Kushal Bhurtel 30 (35); Safyaan Sharif 2/13 (2.5 overs)

Nepal won by 2 wickets
Titwood, Glasgow
Umpires: Iain McDonald (Sco) and David McLean (Sco)
Player of the match: Sandeep Lamichhane (Nep)

- Nepal won the toss and elected to field.
- Karan KC (Nep) took his 100th wicket in T20Is.

18 June 2025
15:00
Scorecard

Netherlands; 198/7 (20 overs)	v	Scotland; 181/9 (20 overs)
Michael Levitt 90 (57); Jasper Davidson 2/29 (4 overs)		Brandon McMullen 51 (27); Teja Nidamanuru 3/30 (4 overs)

Netherlands won by 17 runs
Titwood, Glasgow
Umpires: Iain McDonald (Sco) and David McLean (Sco)
Player of the match: Michael Levitt (Ned)

- Scotland won the toss and elected to field.
- Mackenzie Jones (Sco) made his T20I debut.

19 June 2025
15:00
Scorecard

Netherlands; 174/7 (20 overs)	v	Nepal; 180/4 (19.4 overs)
Michael Levitt 86 (53); Karan KC 2/40 (4 overs)		Kushal Bhurtel 65 (51); Ben Fletcher 1/20 (2 overs)

Nepal won by 6 wickets
Titwood, Glasgow
Umpires: David McLean (Sco) and Ryan Milne (Sco)
Player of the match: Michael Levitt (Ned)

- Nepal won the toss and elected to field.
- Bhim Sharki (Nep) made his T20I debut.

20 June 2025
15:00
Scorecard

Scotland; 193/5 (20 overs)	v	Nepal; 159 (18.5 overs)
George Munsey 78 (39); Kushal Bhurtel 2/20 (2 overs)		Rupesh Singh 43* (22); Chris Greaves 3/27 (3 overs)

Scotland won by 34 runs
Titwood, Glasgow
Umpires: Iain McDonald (Sco) and Ryan Milne (Sco)
Player of the match: George Munsey (Sco)

- Scotland won the toss and elected to bat.
