= 2024 Netherlands Tri-Nation Series (August) =

Fourth tri-nation series round in 2024-26 WCL2

The 2024 Netherlands Tri-Nation Series was the fourth round of the 2024–2026 Cricket World Cup League 2 cricket tournament which took place in the Netherlands in August 2024. The tri-nation series was contested by the men's national teams of Canada, Netherlands and United States. The matches were played as One Day International (ODI) fixtures.

Following the ODI series, the three sides played a Twenty20 International (T20I) tri-nation series.

== League 2 series ==
2024 Netherlands Tri-Nation Series
- Part of 2024–2026 Cricket World Cup League 2
- Date: 11–21 August 2024
- Location: Netherlands
Teams
| Canada | Netherlands | United States |
Captains
| Nicholas Kirton | Scott Edwards | Monank Patel |
Most runs
| Shreyas Movva (181) | Max O'Dowd (223) | Monank Patel (213) |
Most wickets
| Saad Bin Zafar (7) | Paul van Meekeren (13) | Shadley van Schalkwyk (8) |

=== Squads ===
| Canada | Netherlands | United States |
|---|---|---|
| Nicholas Kirton (c); Dilpreet Bajwa; Saad Bin Zafar; Navneet Dhaliwal; Jeremy Gordon; Dillon Heyliger; Aaron Johnson; Rishiv Joshi; Shreyas Movva (wk); Kaleem Sana; Junaid Siddiqui; Pargat Singh; Ravinderpal Singh; Kanwarpal Tathgur; Harsh Thaker; Aaditya Varadarajan | Scott Edwards (c, wk); Musa Ahmed; Shariz Ahmed; Wesley Barresi; Noah Croes; Aryan Dutt; Olivier Elenbaas; Clayton Floyd; Vivian Kingma; Kyle Klein; Ryan Klein; Michael Levitt; Max O'Dowd; Vikramjit Singh; Paul van Meekeren | Monank Patel (c, wk); Aaron Jones (vc); Juanoy Drysdale; Shayan Jahangir; Nosthush Kenjige; Milind Kumar; Yasir Mohammad; Saiteja Mukkamalla; Abhishek Paradkar; Smit Patel (wk); Harmeet Singh; Jessy Singh; Utkarsh Srivastava; Steven Taylor; Shadley van Schalkwyk |

Netherlands named Daniel Doram as a reserve player for the series.

=== Fixtures ===
==== 1st ODI ====
11 August 2024
11:00
Scorecard

| Canada; 194 (48.4 overs) | v | Netherlands; 195/5 (45.3 overs) |
| Shreyas Movva 65 (90); Kyle Klein 4/33 (9.4 overs) | | Max O'Dowd 79* (119); Saad Bin Zafar 3/49 (10 overs) |

Netherlands won by 5 wickets
Sportpark Westvliet, The Hague
Umpires: Nitin Bathi (Ned) and Roland Black (Ire)
Player of the match: Max O'Dowd (Ned)

- Canada won the toss and elected to bat.
- Aaditya Varadarajan (Can) made his ODI debut.
- Nicholas Kirton captained Canada in ODIs for the first time.

==== 2nd ODI ====
13 August 2024
11:00
Scorecard

| United States; 304/4 (50 overs) | v | Canada; 290/9 (50 overs) |
| Monank Patel 121* (95); Pargat Singh 1/21 (4 overs) | | Harsh Thaker 77 (77); Nosthush Kenjige 3/37 (10 overs) |

United States won by 14 runs
Sportpark Westvliet, The Hague
Umpires: Rizwan Akram (Ned) and Nitin Bathi (Ned)
Player of the match: Monank Patel (USA)

- Canada won the toss and elected to field.
- Milind Kumar, Smit Patel, Harmeet Singh and Shadley van Schalkwyk (USA) all made their ODI debuts.

==== 3rd ODI ====
15 August 2024
11:00
Scorecard

| Netherlands; 237/7 (50 overs) | v | United States; 218 (49.5 overs) |
| Scott Edwards 65 (55); Milind Kumar 2/40 (10 overs) | | Milind Kumar 69 (79); Vivian Kingma 3/47 (9 overs) |

Netherlands won by 19 runs
Sportpark Westvliet, The Hague
Umpires: Rizwan Akram (Ned) and Roland Black (Ire)
Player of the match: Scott Edwards (Ned)

- United States won the toss and elected to field.
- Juanoy Drysdale (USA) made his ODI debut.

==== 4th ODI ====
17 August 2024
11:00
Scorecard

| Netherlands; 220 (47.2 overs) | v | Canada; 157 (35.4 overs) |
| Scott Edwards 72 (94); Kaleem Sana 4/30 (7.2 overs) | | Shreyas Movva 47* (72); Paul van Meekeren 5/28 (9.4 overs) |

Netherlands won by 63 runs
Hazelaarweg Stadion, Rotterdam
Umpires: Rizwan Akram (Ned) and Roland Black (Ire)
Player of the match: Paul van Meekeren (Ned)

- Canada won the toss and elected to field.
- Paul van Meekeren (Ned) took his first five-wicket haul in ODIs.

==== 5th ODI ====
19 August 2024
11:00
Scorecard

| United States; 275/8 (50 overs) | v | Canada; 225 (47 overs) |
| Smit Patel 70 (84); Saad Bin Zafar 3/30 (10 overs) | | Pargat Singh 72 (80); Shadley van Schalkwyk 4/20 (8 overs) |

United States won by 50 runs
Hazelaarweg Stadion, Rotterdam
Umpires: Rizwan Akram (Ned) and Nitin Bathi (Ned)
Player of the match: Smit Patel (USA)

- Canada won the toss and elected to field.
- Rishiv Joshi and Kanwarpal Tathgur (Can) both made their ODI debuts.

==== 6th ODI ====
21 August 2024
11:00
Scorecard

| Netherlands; 206 (49.1 overs) | v | United States; 179 (45.5 overs) |
| Max O'Dowd 77 (126); Harmeet Singh 2/25 (10 overs) | | Monank Patel 66 (79); Kyle Klein 4/32 (9.5 overs) |

Netherlands won by 27 runs
Hazelaarweg Stadion, Rotterdam
Umpires: Nitin Bathi (Ned) and Roland Black (Ire)
Player of the match: Kyle Klein (Ned)

- United States won the toss and elected to field.

== T20I series ==
2024 Netherlands T20I Tri-Nation Series
- Date: 23–28 August 2024
- Location: Netherlands
- Result: Netherlands won the series
Teams
| Canada | Netherlands | United States |
Captains
| Nicholas Kirton | Scott Edwards | Monank Patel |
Most runs
| Nicholas Kirton (130) | Michael Levitt (151) | Saiteja Mukkamalla (76) |
Most wickets
| Saad Bin Zafar (6) | Kyle Klein (10) | Shadley van Schalkwyk (7) |

=== Squads ===
| Canada | Netherlands | United States |
|---|---|---|
| Nicholas Kirton (c); Dilpreet Bajwa; Saad Bin Zafar; Jeremy Gordon; Dillon Heyliger; Aaron Johnson; Rishiv Joshi; Akhil Kumar; Parveen Kumar; Shreyas Movva (wk); Rayyan Pathan; Kaleem Sana; Ravinderpal Singh; Kanwarpal Tathgur; Harsh Thaker | Scott Edwards (c, wk); Shariz Ahmad; Noah Croes; Daniel Doram; Aryan Dutt; Brandon Glover; Vivian Kingma; Kyle Klein; Ryan Klein; Michael Levitt; Zach Lion-Cachet; Max O'Dowd; Vikramjit Singh; Paul van Meekeren; Saqib Zulfiqar | Monank Patel (c, wk); Aaron Jones (vc); Juanoy Drysdale; Andries Gous (wk); Shayan Jahangir; Nosthush Kenjige; Ali Khan; Nitish Kumar; Yasir Mohammad; Saiteja Mukkamalla; Abhishek Paradkar; Harmeet Singh; Jessy Singh; Utkarsh Srivastava; Steven Taylor; Shadley van Schalkwyk |

=== Points table ===
| Pos | Team | Pld | W | L | NR | Pts | NRR |
|---|---|---|---|---|---|---|---|
| 1 | Netherlands | 4 | 3 | 1 | 0 | 6 | 1.631 |
| 2 | Canada | 4 | 1 | 2 | 1 | 3 | −0.723 |
| 3 | United States | 4 | 1 | 2 | 1 | 3 | −1.433 |

Source: ESPNcricinfo

=== Fixtures ===
23 August 2024
16:00
Scorecard

| Canada; 152/5 (20 overs) | v | Netherlands; 153/5 (16.1 overs) |
| Nicholas Kirton 69* (58); Kyle Klein 3/31 (4 overs) | | Michael Levitt 62* (47); Harsh Thaker 2/29 (3 overs) |

Netherlands won by 5 wickets
Sportpark Maarschalkerweerd, Utrecht
Umpires: Rizwan Akram (Ned) and Nitin Bathi (Ned)
Player of the match: Michael Levitt (Ned)

- Canada won the toss and elected to bat.
- Zach Lion-Cachet (Ned) made his T20I debut.

24 August 2024
16:00
Scorecard

| Canada; 169/5 (20 overs) | v | United States |
| Aaron Johnson 45 (35); Jessy Singh 2/31 (4 overs) |

No result
Sportpark Maarschalkerweerd, Utrecht
Umpires: Rizwan Akram (Ned) and Nitin Bathi (Ned)

- Canada won the toss and elected to bat.
- No further play was possible due to rain.
- Juanoy Drysdale (USA) made his T20I debut.

25 August 2024
16:00
Scorecard

| Netherlands; 217/5 (20 overs) | v | United States; 115 (15.4 overs) |
| Scott Edwards 81* (40); Shadley van Schalkwyk 3/35 (4 overs) | | Shayan Jahangir 37 (29); Vikramjit Singh 3/16 (3 overs) |

Netherlands won by 102 runs
Sportpark Maarschalkerweerd, Utrecht
Umpires: Rizwan Akram (Ned) and Nitin Bathi (Ned)
Player of the match: Scott Edwards (Ned)

- United States won the toss and elected to field.

26 August 2024
14:00
Scorecard

| Canada; 132/9 (20 overs) | v | Netherlands; 124/8 (20 overs) |
| Saad Bin Zafar 33* (36); Kyle Klein 3/22 (4 overs) | | Noah Croes 32 (28); Parveen Kumar 2/10 (4 overs) |

Canada won by 8 runs
Sportpark Maarschalkerweerd, Utrecht
Umpires: Rizwan Akram (Ned) and Nitin Bathi (Ned)
Player of the match: Saad Bin Zafar (Can)

- Netherlands won the toss and elected to field.
- Akhil Kumar (Can) made his T20I debut.

27 August 2024
14:00
Scorecard

| United States; 168/6 (20 overs) | v | Canada; 148/7 (20 overs) |
| Saiteja Mukkamalla 52 (27); Saad Bin Zafar 3/25 (4 overs) | | Dilpreet Bajwa 56 (41); Aaron Jones 2/8 (2 overs) |

United States won by 20 runs
Sportpark Westvliet, The Hague
Umpires: Rizwan Akram (Ned) and Nitin Bathi (Ned)
Player of the match: Saiteja Mukkamalla (USA)

- United States won the toss and elected to bat.
- Kanwarpal Tathgur (Can) and Saiteja Mukkamalla (USA) both made their T20I debuts.

28 August 2024
14:00
Scorecard

| Netherlands; 132/8 (20 overs) | v | United States; 128 (19.1 overs) |
| Ryan Klein 36* (25); Harmeet Singh 3/8 (4 overs) | | Andries Gous 43 (26); Aryan Dutt 3/22 (4 overs) |

Netherlands won by 4 runs
Sportpark Westvliet, The Hague
Umpires: Rizwan Akram (Ned) and Nitin Bathi (Ned)
Player of the match: Aryan Dutt (Ned)

- Netherlands won the toss and elected to bat.
