= Dutch cricket team in Bangladesh in 2025 =

International cricket tour

	Bangladesh	Netherlands
- Dates: 30 August – 3 September 2025
Captains	Litton Das	Scott Edwards

Twenty20 International series
- Results: Bangladesh won the 3-match series 2–0
Most runs	Litton Das (145)	Aryan Dutt (43)
Most wickets	Taskin Ahmed (6)	Kyle Klein (4)
- Player of the series: Litton Das (Ban)

The Netherlands cricket team toured Bangladesh in August and September 2025 to play the Bangladesh cricket team. The tour consisted of three Twenty20 International (T20I) matches. Following the postponement of the home series against India, the Bangladesh Cricket Board (BCB) organized the series as part of the national team's preparation for the 2025 Asia Cup. All the matches were hosted in Sylhet. It was the Netherlands' first-ever tour to Bangladesh for a bilateral series. In August 2025, the BCB announced the fixtures of the tour.

== Squads ==
Bangladesh	Netherlands
Litton Das (c, wk); Nasum Ahmed; Taskin Ahmed; Jaker Ali (wk); Parvez Hossain Emon; Mahedi Hasan; Tanzid Hasan; Saif Hassan; Rishad Hossain; Shamim Hossain; Towhid Hridoy; Mustafizur Rahman; Nurul Hasan (wk); Mohammad Saifuddin; Tanzim Hasan Sakib; Shoriful Islam	Scott Edwards (c, wk); Shariz Ahmad; Sebastiaan Braat; Noah Croes; Cedric de Lange; Daniel Doram; Aryan Dutt; Ben Fletcher; ~~Fred Klaassen~~; Kyle Klein; ~~Ryan Klein~~; Teja Nidamanuru; Max O'Dowd; Tim Pringle; Vikramjit Singh; Paul van Meekeren; ~~Saqib Zulfiqar~~; Sikander Zulfiqar

On 25 August, Fred Klaassen (injury), Ryan Klein (injury) and Saqib Zulfiqar (personal reasons) were ruled out of the series, with Sebastiaan Braat, Cedric de Lange and Sikander Zulfiqar were named as their replacement.

== T20I series ==
=== 1st T20I ===
30 August 2025
18:00 (N)
Scorecard

Netherlands; 136/8 (20 overs)	v	Bangladesh; 138/2 (13.3 overs)
Teja Nidamanuru 26 (26); Taskin Ahmed 4/28 (4 overs)		Litton Das 54* (29); Tim Pringle 1/16 (2 overs)

Bangladesh won by 8 wickets
Sylhet International Cricket Stadium, Sylhet
Umpires: Tanvir Ahmed (Ban) and Morshed Ali Khan (Ban)
Player of the match: Taskin Ahmed (Ban)

- Bangladesh won the toss and elected to field.

=== 2nd T20I ===
1 September 2025
18:00 (N)
Scorecard

Netherlands; 103 (17.3 overs)	v	Bangladesh; 104/1 (13.1 overs)
Aryan Dutt 30 (24); Nasum Ahmed 3/21 (4 overs)		Tanzid Hasan 54* (40); Kyle Klein 1/20 (2.1 overs)

Bangladesh won by 9 wickets
Sylhet International Cricket Stadium, Sylhet
Umpires: Tanvir Ahmed (Ban) and Masudur Rahman (Ban)
Player of the match: Nasum Ahmed (Ban)

- Bangladesh won the toss and elected to field.

=== 3rd T20I ===
3 September 2025
18:00 (N)
Scorecard

Bangladesh; 164/4 (18.2 overs)	v	Netherlands
Litton Das 73 (46); Kyle Klein 3/53 (4 overs)

No result
Sylhet International Cricket Stadium, Sylhet
Umpires: Morshed Ali Khan (Ban) and Masudur Rahman (Ban)

- Netherlands won the toss and elected to field.
- No further play was possible due to rain.
- Litton Das scored the most number of fifties (14) in T20Is for Bangladesh, surpassing Shakib Al Hasan.
