= 2024 Nepal Tri-Nation Series =

First tri-nation series round in 2024-26 WCL2

The 2024 Nepal Tri-Nation Series was the first round of the 2024–2026 Cricket World Cup League 2 cricket tournament took place in Nepal in February 2024. The tri-nation series was contested by the men's national teams of Namibia, Nepal and Netherlands. The matches were played as One Day International (ODI) fixtures.

Following the ODI series, the three sides played a Twenty20 International (T20I) tri-nation series. The Netherlands defeated Nepal in the final by 4 wickets.

== League 2 series ==
2024 Nepal Tri-Nation Series
- Part of 2024–2026 Cricket World Cup League 2
- Date: 15–25 February 2024
Teams
Namibia	Nepal	Netherlands
Captains
Gerhard Erasmus	Rohit Paudel	Scott Edwards
Most runs
Gerhard Erasmus (85) Jan Nicol Loftie-Eaton (85)	Aasif Sheikh (133)	Max O'Dowd (107)
Most wickets
Gerhard Erasmus (12)	Kushal Bhurtel (7)	Aryan Dutt (11)

=== Squads ===
Namibia	Nepal	Netherlands
Gerhard Erasmus (c); JJ Smit (vc); Jack Brassell; Niko Davin; Shaun Fouché; Jan Frylinck; Zane Green (wk); Jean-Pierre Kotze (wk); Malan Kruger; Michael van Lingen; Jan Nicol Loftie-Eaton; Tangeni Lungameni; Bernard Scholtz; Ben Shikongo; Ruben Trumpelmann	Rohit Paudel (c); Dipendra Singh Airee; Kushal Bhurtel; ~~Rijan Dhakal~~; Gulshan Jha; Dev Khanal; Sompal Kami; Karan KC; Kushal Malla; Lalit Rajbanshi; Pawan Sarraf; Anil Sah (wk); ~~Arjun Saud (wk)~~; Bhim Sharki; Aarif Sheikh; Aasif Sheikh (wk); Surya Tamang	Scott Edwards (c, wk); Shariz Ahmad; Wesley Barresi; Noah Croes; Max O'Dowd; Aryan Dutt; Olivier Elenbaas; Sybrand Engelbrecht; Vivian Kingma; Kyle Klein; Bas de Leede; Michael Levitt; Roelof van der Merwe; Teja Nidamanuru; Vikramjit Singh

Nepal also named Pratis GC, Dev Khanal, Anil Sah and Bibek Yadav as reserves for the series. Before the start of the series, Rijan Dhakal and Arjun Saud were replaced in the Nepal squad by reserves Dev Khanal and Anil Sah.

=== Fixtures ===
==== 1st ODI ====
15 February 2024
09:30
Scorecard

Nepal; 132 (41.1 overs)	v	Namibia; 134/6 (33.1 overs)
Bhim Sharki 44 (86); Gerhard Erasmus 5/28 (8.1 overs)		Jan Frylinck 34 (53); Sompal Kami 3/32 (7 overs)

Namibia won by 4 wickets
Tribhuvan University International Cricket Ground, Kirtipur
Umpires: Buddhi Pradhan (Nep) and Asif Yaqoob (Pak)
Player of the match: Gerhard Erasmus (Nam)

- Namibia won the toss and elected to field.
- Jack Brassell (Nam) made his ODI debut.
- Gerhard Erasmus (Nam) took his first five-wicket haul in ODIs.

==== 2nd ODI ====
17 February 2024
09:30
Scorecard

Netherlands; 137 (39 overs)	v	Nepal; 141/1 (15.2 overs)
Scott Edwards 33 (49); Kushal Bhurtel 4/20 (7 overs)		Anil Sah 57* (36); Vivian Kingma 1/28 (3 overs)

Nepal won by 9 wickets
Tribhuvan University International Cricket Ground, Kirtipur
Umpires: Durga Subedi (Nep) and Asif Yaqoob (Pak)
Player of the match: Kushal Bhurtel (Nep)

- Nepal won the toss and elected to field.
- Kyle Klein and Michael Levitt (Ned) both made their ODI debuts.

==== 3rd ODI ====
19 February 2024
09:30
Scorecard

Namibia; 123 (35.1 overs)	v	Netherlands; 124/3 (27.2 overs)
JJ Smit 26 (46); Aryan Dutt 6/34 (9 overs)		Michael Levitt 57 (81); Gerhard Erasmus 3/23 (7 overs)

Netherlands won by 7 wickets
Tribhuvan University International Cricket Ground, Kirtipur
Umpires: Buddhi Pradhan (Nep) and Durga Subedi (Nep)
Player of the match: Aryan Dutt (Ned)

- Netherlands won the toss and elected to field.
- Aryan Dutt (Ned) took his first five-wicket haul in ODIs.
- Aryan Dutt's bowling figures were the best for the Netherlands in men's ODIs.

==== 4th ODI ====
21 February 2024
09:30
Scorecard

Nepal; 168 (37.1 overs)	v	Namibia; 172/8 (40 overs)
Aasif Sheikh 58 (64); Bernard Scholtz 4/31 (10 overs)		Gerhard Erasmus 52 (56); Kushal Bhurtel 3/28 (5 overs)

Namibia won by 2 wickets
Tribhuvan University International Cricket Ground, Kirtipur
Umpires: Buddhi Pradhan (Nep) and Asif Yaqoob (Pak)
Player of the match: Bernard Scholtz (Nam)

- Namibia won the toss and elected to field.

==== 5th ODI ====
23 February 2024
09:30
Scorecard

Namibia; 203 (41.3 overs)	v	Netherlands; 179 (43.5 overs)
Jan Nicol Loftie-Eaton 49 (43); Vivian Kingma 3/19 (6.3 overs)		Noah Croes 46* (56); Jan Frylinck 3/22 (5.5 overs)

Namibia won by 24 runs
Tribhuvan University International Cricket Ground, Kirtipur
Umpires: Vinay Kumar Jha (Nep) and Buddhi Pradhan (Nep)
Player of the match: Jan Frylinck (Nam)

- Netherlands won the toss and elected to field.
- The match was reduced to 45 overs per side due to a wet outfield.
- Malan Kruger (Nam) made his ODI debut.

==== 6th ODI ====
25 February 2024
09:30
Scorecard

Nepal; 172 (49.3 overs)	v	Netherlands; 173/2 (37.5 overs)
Kushal Bhurtel 66 (93); Aryan Dutt 3/16 (10 overs)		Vikramjit Singh 58* (92); Dipendra Singh Airee 1/30 (10 overs)

Netherlands won by 8 wickets
Tribhuvan University International Cricket Ground, Kirtipur
Umpires: Vinay Kumar Jha (Nep) and Asif Yaqoob (Pak)
Player of the match: Vikramjit Singh (Ned)

- Netherlands won the toss and elected to field.

== T20I series ==
2024 Nepal T20I Tri-Nation Series
- Date: 27 February – 5 March 2024
- Result: Netherlands won the tournament
- Player of the series: (Netherlands) Michael Levitt
Teams
Namibia	Nepal	Netherlands
Captains
Gerhard Erasmus (Note: JJ Smit captained Namibia in all of their matches in the T20I series.)	Rohit Paudel	Scott Edwards
Most runs
Jan Nicol Loftie-Eaton (146)	Rohit Paudel (173)	Michael Levitt (247)
Most wickets
Ruben Trumpelmann (7)	Kushal Malla (7)	Vivian Kingma (6); Timm van der Gugten (6)

=== Squads ===
Namibia	Nepal	Netherlands
Gerhard Erasmus (c); JJ Smit (vc); Peter-Daniel Blignaut; Jack Brassell; Niko Davin; Shaun Fouché; Jan Frylinck; Zane Green (wk); Jean-Pierre Kotze (wk); Malan Kruger; Michael van Lingen; Jan Nicol Loftie-Eaton; Tangeni Lungameni; Bernard Scholtz; Ben Shikongo; Ruben Trumpelmann	Rohit Paudel (c); Dipendra Singh Airee; Abinash Bohara; Binod Bhandari (wk); Kushal Bhurtel; Sagar Dhakal; Pratis GC; Gulsan Jha; Sundeep Jora; Karan KC; Rashid Khan; Sompal Kami; Kushal Malla; Lalit Rajbanshi; Aarif Sheikh; Aasif Sheikh (wk); Anil Sah (wk); Bibek Yadav	Scott Edwards (c, wk); Shariz Ahmad; Wesley Barresi (wk); Noah Croes (wk); Aryan Dutt; Sybrand Engelbrecht; Vivian Kingma; Fred Klaassen; Kyle Klein; Michael Levitt; Teja Nidamanuru; Max O'Dowd; Vikramjit Singh; Timm van der Gugten; Roelof van der Merwe

Netherlands also named Daniel Doram as a reserve player for the series.

=== Round-robin ===
==== Points table ====
Pos	Team	Pld	W	L	NR	Pts	NRR	Qualification
1	Netherlands	4	2	1	1	5	0.310	Advanced to the final
2	Nepal	4	2	2	0	4	0.293	Advanced to the final
3	Namibia	4	1	2	1	3	−0.700	

Source: ESPNcricinfo

==== Fixtures ====
27 February 2024
11:30
Scorecard

Namibia; 206/4 (20 overs)	v	Nepal; 186 (18.5 overs)
Jan Nicol Loftie-Eaton 101 (36); Rohit Paudel 2/30 (4 overs)		Dipendra Singh Airee 48 (32); Ruben Trumpelmann 4/29 (3.5 overs)

Namibia won by 20 runs
Tribhuvan University International Cricket Ground, Kirtipur
Umpires: Vinay Kumar Jha (Nep) and Buddhi Pradhan (Nep)
Player of the match: Jan Nicol Loftie-Eaton (Nam)

- Namibia won the toss and elected to bat.
- Peter-Daniel Blignaut and Malan Kruger (Nam) both made their T20I debuts.
- Jan Nicol Loftie-Eaton (Nam) scored his first century in T20Is. This was the fastest century in men's T20Is, in terms of number of deliveries faced (33).

28 February 2024
11:30
Scorecard

Netherlands; 184/4 (20 overs)	v	Nepal; 182/8 (20 overs)
Michael Levitt 54 (36); Karan KC 1/29 (3 overs)		Dipendra Singh Airee 63 (34); Sybrand Engelbrecht 2/13 (2 overs)

Netherlands won by 2 runs
Tribhuvan University International Cricket Ground, Kirtipur
Umpires: Buddhi Pradhan (Nep) and Durga Subedi (Nep)
Player of the match: Sybrand Engelbrecht (Ned)

- Nepal won the toss and elected to field.
- Noah Croes, Sybrand Engelbrecht and Michael Levitt (Ned) all made their T20I debuts.

29 February 2024
11:30
Scorecard

Netherlands; 247/5 (20 overs)	v	Namibia; 188/7 (20 overs)
Michael Levitt 135 (62); Ruben Trumpelmann 2/46 (4 overs)		Zane Green 42* (20); Timm van der Gugten 2/26 (4 overs)

Netherlands won by 59 runs
Tribhuvan University International Cricket Ground, Kirtipur
Umpires: Vinay Kumar Jha (Nep) and Durga Subedi (Nep)
Player of the match: Michael Levitt (Ned)

- Netherlands won the toss and elected to bat.
- Michael Levitt (Ned) scored his first century in T20Is.

1 March 2024
11:30
Scorecard

Nepal; 180/8 (20 overs)	v	Namibia; 177/7 (20 overs)
Kushal Malla 55* (37); Ben Shikongo 3/28 (4 overs)		JJ Smit 50 (26); Dipendra Singh Airee 2/29 (4 overs)

Nepal won by 3 runs
Tribhuvan University International Cricket Ground, Kirtipur
Umpires: Vinay Kumar Jha (Nep) and Buddhi Pradhan (Nep)
Player of the match: Kushal Malla (Nep)

- Namibia won the toss and elected to field.
- Jack Brassell (Nam) made his T20I debut.

2 March 2024
11:30
Scorecard

Netherlands; 120 (19.3 overs)	v	Nepal; 121/4 (15.2 overs)
Max O'Dowd 31 (24); Pratis GC 3/13 (4 overs)		Rohit Paudel 46 (34); Vivian Kingma 3/17 (4 overs)

Nepal won by 6 wickets
Tribhuvan University International Cricket Ground, Kirtipur
Umpires: Buddhi Pradhan (Nep) and Durga Subedi (Nep)
Player of the match: Pratis GC (Nep)

- Netherlands won the toss and elected to bat.
- Kyle Klein (Ned) made his T20I debut.

3 March 2024
11:30
Scorecard

Namibia; 98/4 (15 overs)	v	Netherlands
Jan Nicol Loftie-Eaton 34* (29); Vivian Kingma 1/12 (3 overs)

No result
Tribhuvan University International Cricket Ground, Kirtipur
Umpires: Vinay Kumar Jha (Nep) and Durga Subedi (Nep)

- Netherlands won the toss and elected to field.
- No further play was possible due to rain.
- Shaun Fouché (Nam) made his T20I debut.

=== Final ===
5 March 2024
11:30
Scorecard

Nepal; 184/8 (20 overs)	v	Netherlands; 189/6 (19.3 overs)
Aasif Sheikh 47 (37); Sybrand Engelbrecht 2/14 (2 overs)		Michael Levitt 54 (29); Kushal Malla 4/33 (3 overs)

Netherlands won by 4 wickets
Tribhuvan University International Cricket Ground, Kirtipur
Umpires: Buddhi Pradhan (Nep) and Durga Subedi (Nep)
Player of the match: Michael Levitt (Ned)

- Nepal won the toss and elected to bat.
