= Sybrand Engelbrecht (cricketer) =

South African-Dutch cricketer

Personal information
- Full name: Sybrand Abraham Engelbrecht
- Born: 15 September 1988 (age 38); Johannesburg, Transvaal, South Africa
- Batting: Right-handed
- Bowling: Right-arm off break
- Role: Batsman

International information
- National side: Netherlands (2023–2024)
- ODI debut (cap 84): 9 October 2023 v New Zealand
- Last ODI: 25 February 2024 v Nepal
- ODI shirt no.: 72
- T20I debut (cap 58): 28 February 2024 v Nepal
- Last T20I: 16 June 2024 v Sri Lanka

Domestic team information
- Years: Team
- 2007/08: Northerns
- 2008/09–2015/16: Cape Cobras
- 2008/09–2016/17: Western Province

Career statistics
| Competition | ODI | T20I | FC | LA |
|---|---|---|---|---|
| Matches | 12 | 12 | 54 | 70 |
| Runs scored | 385 | 280 | 3,067 | 1,660 |
| Batting average | 35.00 | 31.11 | 40.35 | 42.56 |
| 100s/50s | 0/2 | 0/1 | 7/10 | 0/12 |
| Top score | 70 | 75 | 214* | 97* |
| Balls bowled | 12 | 48 | 2,576 | 1,946 |
| Wickets | 0 | 5 | 37 | 41 |
| Bowling average | – | 14.20 | 44.40 | 40.58 |
| 5 wickets in innings | – | 0 | 1 | 0 |
| 10 wickets in match | – | 0 | 0 | 0 |
| Best bowling | – | 2/13 | 5/74 | 3/28 |
| Catches/stumpings | 9/– | 5/– | 47/– | 40/– |
- Source: ESPNcricinfo, 17 June 2024

Sybrand Abraham Engelbrecht (born 15 September 1988) is a South African-born former Dutch cricketer who played for the Netherlands national cricket team. On 17 June 2024, he announced his retirement from international cricket.

== Biography ==
Engelbrecht was born in Johannesburg. He attended school at the Afrikaanse Hoër Seunskool and holds an MBA degree from the University of Stellenbosch Business School.

He made his first-class debut for Northerns in October 2007 and scored 45 runs and took four wickets against North West in the Provincial Challenge. He made an impact during the Under-19 World Cup in Malaysia in 2008 with his fielding at point and took catches that drew comparison with Jonty Rhodes. He played for Cape Cobras and was the replacement for an injured JP Duminy at the 2014 Champions League Twenty20. Cobras released him from their contract list in 2016. He was included in the South Western Districts cricket team for the 2015 Africa T20 Cup.

Engelbrecht later moved to the Netherlands to play club cricket. He has captained VCC in the Topklasse. In 2023 he met ICC residency qualifications to play for the Netherlands and was named in a Netherlands A squad for a series against Guernsey. He made his One Day International (ODI) debut during the 2023 World Cup in a match against New Zealand at Hyderabad on 9 October.

In February 2024, he was selected to T20I squad for the 2024 Nepal Tri-Nation Series. He made his Twenty20 International (T20I) debut against Nepal at Kirtipur on 28 February 2024. In May 2024, he was named in the Netherlands squad for the 2024 ICC Men's T20 World Cup tournament.
