= Mackenzie Jones =

Scottish cricketer

Personal information
- Full name: Mackenzie William Jones
- Born: 6 March 2005 (age 21); Welwyn Garden City, Hertfordshire, England
- Batting: Right-handed
- Bowling: Right-arm fast
- Role: Bowler

International information
- National side: Scotland (2025–present)
- ODI debut (cap 86): 8 June 2025 v Nepal
- Last ODI: 8 April 2026 v Oman
- T20I debut (cap 65): 18 June 2025 v Netherlands
- Last T20I: 18 April 2026 v Namibia

Domestic team information
- Years: Team
- 2025–2026: Essex (squad no. 59)

Career statistics
Competition	ODI	T20I	FC	LA
Matches	3	3	1	11
Runs scored	9	9	0	75
Batting average	–	9.00	–	12.50
100s/50s	0/0	0/0	0/0	0/0
Top score	9*	9	0*	19*
Balls bowled	120	60	78	496
Wickets	4	6	1	19
Bowling average	40.25	13.00	57.00	29.05
5 wickets in innings	0	0	0	0
10 wickets in match	0	0	0	0
Best bowling	3/55	4/22	1/57	3/43
Catches/stumpings	4/–	0/–	0/–	11/–
- Source: ESPNcricinfo, 12 August 2026

Mackenzie William Jones (born 6 June 2005) is a Scottish cricketer who currently plays for Essex County Cricket Club. He plays as a right-arm fast bowler and also bats right-handed. He made his international debut for Scotland in 2025.

== Domestic career ==
In April 2025, Jones signed his first rookie contract with Essex County Cricket Club. He made his first-class debut for Essex against Hampshire in 2025 County Championship on 22 June 2025.

== International career ==
In May 2025, Jones received a first senior international call-up to Scotland's ODI squad for the 2025 Scotland Tri-Nation Series which was part of the 2024–2026 Cricket World Cup League 2. He made his One Day International debut against Nepal on 8 June 2025, in ICC Cricket World Cup League 2. He made his Twenty20 International debut against the Netherlands, on 18 June 2025.
