= Yuvraaj Samra =

Canadian international cricketer

Personal information
- Full name: Yuvraaj Singh Samra
- Born: September 29, 2006 (age 20); Brampton, Ontario, Canada
- Batting: Left-handed
- Bowling: Right-arm off break
- Role: Top-order batter

International information
- National side: Canada
- ODI debut (cap 102): 5 March 2025 v Netherlands
- Last ODI: 13 August 2026 v Scotland
- T20I debut (cap 73): 19 March 2025 v Namibia
- Last T20I: 19 February 2026 v Afghanistan

Domestic team information
- Years: Team
- 2026: Amsterdam Flames
- 2026: Pokhara Avengers

Career statistics
Competition	ODI	T20I	LA	T20
Matches	19	20	17	31
Runs scored	495	586	473	798
Batting average	29.11	36.62	31.53	31.92
100s/50s	1/3	1/3	0/4	1/4
Top score	105	110	80	110
Balls bowled	24	12	24	12
Wickets	1	2	1	2
Bowling average	31.00	6.50	31.00	6.50
5 wickets in innings	0	0	0	0
10 wickets in match	0	0	0	0
Best bowling	1/31	2/13	1/31	2/13
Catches/stumpings	3/–	3/–	4/–	3/–
- Source: Cricinfo, 25 September 2026

Yuvraaj Singh Samra (born 29 September 2006) is a Canadian international cricketer who plays as a left-handed top-order batter. He represents the Canada national cricket team in One Day Internationals (ODIs) and Twenty20 Internationals (T20Is).

== Early life and domestic career ==
Samra was born in Brampton, Ontario. He was introduced to cricket by his father, who emigrated to Canada from India. As a child, he often accompanied his father to local matches and quickly developed an interest in the sport. His father, Baljit Singh, named his child after famous Indian all-rounder Yuvraj Singh. He later progressed through local cricket programs and leagues. Domestically, Samra has played in the Toronto District Cricket Association (TDCA) and the Brampton & Etobicoke District Cricket League (BEDCL).

== International career ==
In February 2024, Samra scored 124 runs against Hong Kong in a tour match. He made his List A debut for Canada against Zimbabwe A on 26 February 2025. He scored 80 runs in the second match of the series.

Samra made his ODI debut for Canada on 5 March 2025 against Netherlands in the 2025 Namibia Tri-Nation Series of 2024–2026 Cricket World Cup League 2 cricket tournament. Later that month, he made his T20I debut on the same tour against Namibia. In January 2026, Samra was named in Canada's squad for 2026 ICC Men's T20 World Cup.

Samra scored 110 off 65 balls against New Zealand in the T20 World Cup Group Stage which is the highest score at the moment.

== Records ==
In June 2025, Samra scored a half-century in just 15 balls during a T20 World Cup Americas Qualifier match against Bahamas — the fastest half-century by a Canadian in T20I cricket. Canada chased down a target of 53, with Samra contributing 50 of the 54 total runs. He broke the record set just three days earlier by teammate Harsh Thaker, who had scored a fifty in 16 balls. In February 2026, Samra scored 110 against New Zealand and became the first player from Associate Nations to score a T20 World Cup century against a full member team.
