= Topklasse (cricket) =

Cricket competition in the Netherlands

- Administrator: Koninklijke Nederlandse Cricket Bond
- Format: Limited overs cricket
- Number of teams: 8
- Current champion: RCC (3rd title)
- Most successful: HCC (49)
- Most runs: Tim de Leede (11,939)
- Most wickets: Tim de Leede (476)

The Topklasse (known until 2010 as the Hoofdklasse) is the highest domestic 50-over cricket competition in the Netherlands.

Until 2016 the league featured 8 teams playing in a double round-robin format, followed by relegation and championship play-offs. From 2017 the league reverted to a 10-team double round-robin format. From 2026, the league will revert to an 8-team double round-robin format.

The dominant club in terms of league titles has been HCC, (Hague Cricket Club). Based in The Hague, the club was formed in 1878 and won the first Dutch title in 1884. As of 2023, the club has won 49 Topklasse titles, most recently in 2022. The club was so dominant in Dutch cricket in the years after World War I that its Second XI was allowed to play in the top division and won the title five times between 1928 and 1935 - as well as sharing the title with the HCC First XI in 1926.

The current champions as of the 2026 edition are RCC.

== Previous champions ==
- 1884 - HCC
- 1885 - HCC
- 1886 - HCC
- 1887 - USV Hercules
- 1888 - HC & FV Olympia
- 1889 - GC & FC Olympia
- 1890 - Rood en Wit
- 1891 - Amstel’s CC
- 1892 - Rood en Wit
- 1893 - Rood en Wit
- 1894 - Rood en Wit
- 1895 - HCC
- 1896 - Amstel’s CC
- 1897 - Ajax (L)
- 1898 - Rood en Wit
- 1899 - HCC
- 1900 - Rood en Wit
- 1901 - HCC
- 1902 - Rood en Wit
- 1903 - HCC
- 1904 - Volharding
- 1905 - Amstel’s CC
- 1906 - HCC
- 1907 - Rood en Wit
- 1908 - Volharding
- 1909 - Amstel’s CC
- 1910 - Rood en Wit
- 1911 - Rood en Wit
- 1912 - HCC
- 1913 - Rood en Wit
- 1914 - unfinished
- 1915 - Rood en Wit
- 1916 - HCC
- 1917 - HCC
- 1918 - Prisoners of War A
- 1919 - HCC
- 1920 - HCC
- 1921 - HCC
- 1922 - HCC
- 1923 - HCC
- 1924 - VRA
- 1925 - HCC
- 1926 - HCC I en HCC II
- 1927 - HCC
- 1928 - HCC II
- 1929 - HCC II
- 1930 - HCC II
- 1931 - HCC
- 1932 - HCC II & VOC
- 1933 - HCC
- 1934 - HCC
- 1935 - HCC II
- 1936 - HCC
- 1937 - VRA
- 1938 - Hermes DVS
- 1939 - PW Enschede
- 1940 - ACC (north), HCC (south)
- 1941 - HCC
- 1942 - ACC
- 1943 - ACC
- 1944 - VVV
- 1945 - no competition
- 1946 - Hermes DVS
- 1947 - HCC
- 1948 - ACC
- 1949 - ACC
- 1950 - ACC
- 1951 - ACC
- 1952 - HCC II
- 1953 - ACC
- 1954 - ACC
- 1955 - HCC II
- 1956 - HCC
- 1957 - HCC
- 1958 - HCC
- 1959 - HCC
- 1960 - HCC
- 1961 - HCC II
- 1962 - Rood en Wit
- 1963 - HCC
- 1964 - HCC
- 1965 - Quick (H) & VOC
- 1966 - HCC
- 1967 - HCC
- 1968 - HCC
- 1969 - HBS & Rood en Wit
- 1970 - Quick (H)
- 1971 - Rood en Wit
- 1972 - HCC
- 1973 - HCC II
- 1974 - VOC
- 1975 - VOC
- 1976 - HCC
- 1977 - VOC
- 1978 - HBS
- 1979 - HBS
- 1980 - HBS
- 1981 - VRA
- 1982 - VOC
- 1983 - VOC
- 1984 - VOC
- 1985 - HCC
- 1986 - Quick (H)
- 1987 - VOC
- 1988 - Kampong
- 1989 - Kampong
- 1990 - Koninklijke UD
- 1991 - Excelsior '20
- 1992 - Kampong
- 1993 - Excelsior '20
- 1994 - VOC
- 1995 - Excelsior '20
- 1996 - Excelsior '20
- 1997 - Excelsior '20
- 1998 - VRA
- 1999 - VRA
- 2000 - Excelsior '20
- 2001 - VRA
- 2002 - VCC
- 2003 - VRA
- 2004 - Excelsior '20
- 2005 - VRA
- 2006 - VRA
- 2007 - VRA
- 2008 - HCC
- 2009 - Excelsior '20
- 2010 - VRA
- 2011 - VRA
- 2012 - Excelsior '20
- 2013 - Quick (H)
- 2014 - Quick (H)
- 2015 - Dosti United CC
- 2016 - Excelsior '20
- 2017 - Excelsior '20
- 2018 - VOC
- 2019 - Excelsior '20
- 2020 - HCC
- 2021 - Punjab CCR
- 2022 - HCC
- 2023 - VCC
- 2024 - Punjab-Ghausia
- 2025 - Kampong
- 2026 - RCC

== Championship titles ==
Club	Number of titles
HCC	49
Rood en Wit	15
VRA, Excelsior'20	12
VOC	11
ACC	9
Quick (H)	5
HBS, Kampong	4
RCC	3
Hermes DVS, VCC	2
PW Enschede, VVV, Kon. UD, Dosti-United	1
