= VRA Amsterdam =

Cricket club in the Netherlands

VRA Amsterdam (Volharding RAP Amstels) is a cricket club in Amstelveen, Netherlands. It was founded on September 5, 1914 from the merger of Volharding (1889), RAP (1887) and Amstels C.C. (1885). In the early years the club played visiting English teams at locations like the Vondelpark, Museumplein and the Olympic Stadium. In 1939 VRA moved to the Amsterdamse Bos, where it is located right next to the international Wagener Stadium.

The 14,500-capacity VRA Cricket Ground is one of the few grounds on the European mainland with a grass wicket and has become a hub of international cricket. VRA hosted the 2004 Videocon Cup, a three-Nation tournament featuring Australia, India and Pakistan, which attracted tens of thousands of supporters, and the 1999 Cricket World Cup match between South Africa and Kenya. In July 2006 the Netherlands played their first ODI at the VRA ground against Sri Lanka when Sanath Jayasuriya (157) and Tillakaratne Dilshan (117*) laid the foundation for a score of 443 runs, a record score for an ODI. This record was only broken 10 years later.

Currently, five men's teams play on Sunday and seven teams on Saturday, including the Women's Team and seven youth teams.

== Honours ==
=== Men ===
- Dutch Champions: 19

Amstels CC: 1891, 1896, 1905, 1909
Volharding: 1904, 1908
VRA: 1924, 1937, 1981, 1998, 1999, 2001, 2002, 2003, 2005, 2006, 2007, 2010, 2011

=== Women ===
- Dutch Champions 3

VRA: 2000, 2004, 2009

== Notable players ==
- Peter Borren
- Tom Cooper
- Eric Szwarczynski
- Ben Cooper
- Adeel Raja
- Vikramjit Singh
