= Jack Brassell =

Namibian cricketer

Personal information
- Full name: Jack Thomas Brassell
- Born: 31 March 2005 (age 21); Cape Town, South Africa
- Batting: Right-handed
- Bowling: Right-arm medium
- Role: Bowler

International information
- National side: Namibia
- ODI debut (cap 40): 15 February 2024 v Nepal
- Last ODI: 14 February 2025 v United States
- T20I debut (cap 27): 1 March 2024 v Nepal
- Last T20I: 23 March 2025 v Canada

Career statistics
Competition	ODI	T20I
Matches	8	15
Runs scored	2	7
Batting average	0.40	7.00
100s/50s	0/0	0/0
Top score	1	5*
Balls bowled	318	223
Wickets	8	11
Bowling average	36.75	28.36
5 wickets in innings	0	0
10 wickets in match	0	0
Best bowling	2/11	2/15
Catches/stumpings	2/–	2/–
- Source: Cricinfo, 17 May 2025

Jack Thomas Brassell (born 31 March 2005) is a South African born–Namibian cricketer.

== International career ==
He made his One Day International debut on 15 February 2024, for Namibia against the Nepal at Kirtipur. He made his Twenty20 International in 2024 Nepal Tri-Nation Series against Namibia.

In May 2024, he was named in Namibia's squad for the 2024 ICC Men's T20 World Cup tournament.

In January 2026, Brassell was named in Namibia's squad for the 2026 T20 World Cup.
