= Malan Kruger =

Namibian cricketer (born 1995)

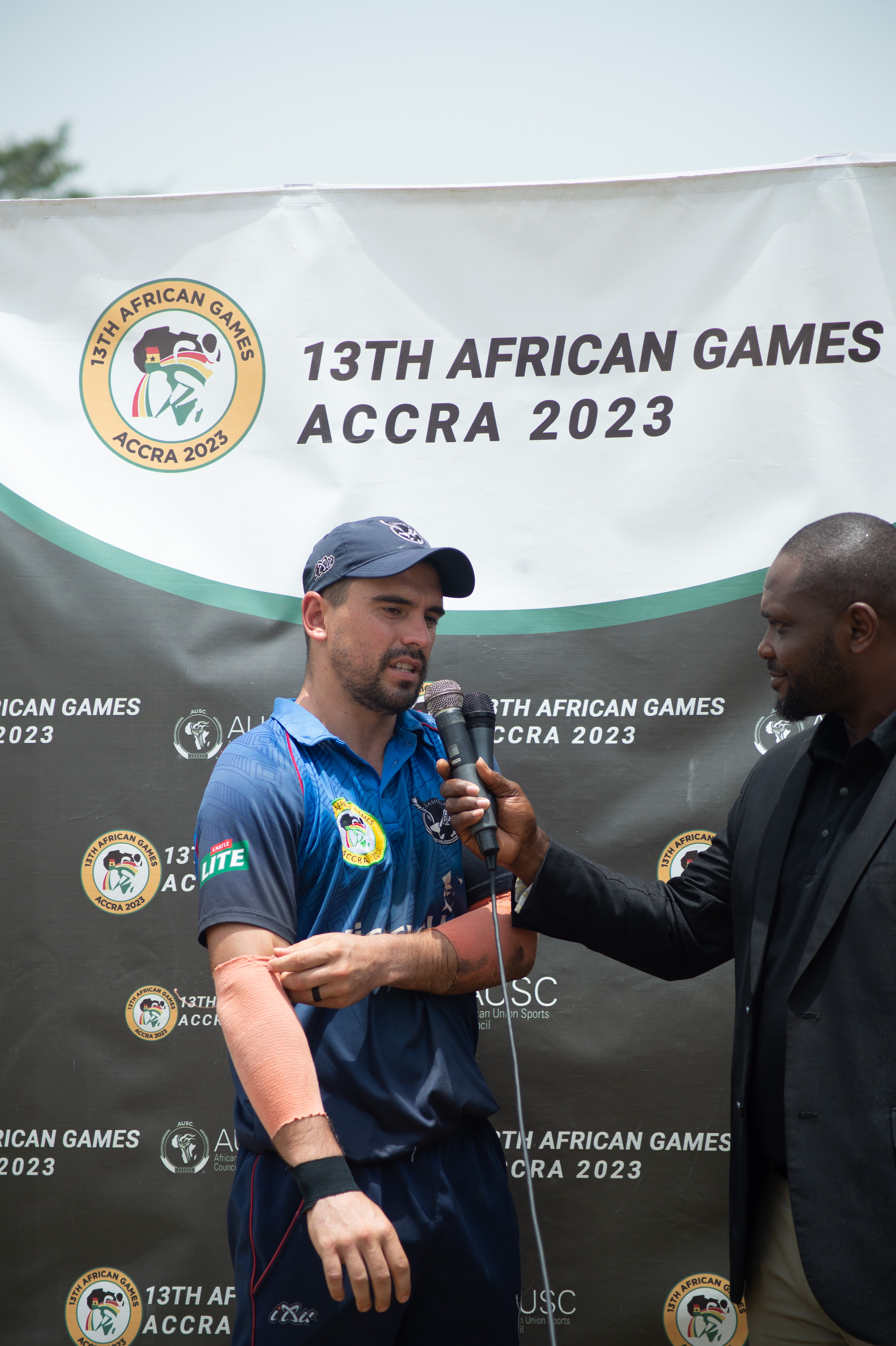
- 2023 African Games

Personal information
- Full name: Malan Binneman Kruger
- Born: 12 April 1995 (age 31); Otjiwarongo, Namibia
- Batting: Right-handed
- Role: Batter

International information
- National side: Namibia (2024–present)
- ODI debut (cap 41): 23 February 2024 v Netherlands
- Last ODI: 4 September 2025 v Scotland
- T20I debut (cap 26): 27 February 2024 v Nepal
- Last T20I: 11 October 2025 v South Africa

Career statistics
| Competition | ODI | T20I | FC | LA |
|---|---|---|---|---|
| Matches | 18 | 28 | 1 | 21 |
| Runs scored | 393 | 402 | 15 | 443 |
| Batting average | 23.11 | 16.75 | 7.50 | 22.15 |
| 100s/50s | 0/2 | 0/1 | 0/0 | 0/2 |
| Top score | 80 | 59* | 15 | 80 |
| Catches/stumpings | 10/– | 5/– | 0/– | 10/– |
- Source: ESPNcricinfo, 12 October 2025

Malan Binneman Kruger (born 12 April 1995) is a Namibian cricketer. A right-handed batsman, Kruger played in the 2014 ICC Under-19 Cricket World Cup.

== Domestic career ==
He made his first-class debut for Namibia against South Western Districts, on 30 October 2014. He made his Twenty20 debut for Namibia against South Western Districts, on 2 November 2014.

He made his List A debut on 29 March 2022, for Namibia A against the Ireland Wolves in Windhoek.

== International career ==
In February 2024, he was named in Namibia's ODI squad for the 2024 Nepal Tri-Nation Series, which was formed part of 2023–2027 ICC Cricket World Cup League 2 and T20I squad for the 2024 Nepal T20I Tri-Nation Series. He made his One Day International debut on 23 February 2024, for Namibia against the Netherlands at Kirtipur. He made his Twenty20 International debut for Namibia against Nepal, on 27 February 2024.

In May 2024, he was named in Namibia's squad for the 2024 ICC Men's T20 World Cup tournament.

In January 2026, Kruger was named in Namibia's squad for the 2026 T20 World Cup.
