= Michael Levitt (cricketer) =

Dutch cricketer (born 2003)

Personal information
- Full name: Michael Levitt
- Born: 19 June 2003 (age 23)
- Batting: Right-handed
- Bowling: Right-arm fast-medium
- Role: Top order batter

International information
- National side: Netherlands
- ODI debut (cap 86): 17 February 2024 v Nepal
- Last ODI: 12 June 2025 v Scotland
- T20I debut (cap 59): 28 February 2024 v Nepal
- Last T20I: 18 February 2026 v India

Domestic team information
- Years: Team
- 2026: Rotterdam Dockers

Career statistics
Competition	ODI	T20I	LA	T20
Matches	17	30	17	40
Runs scored	443	945	443	1,107
Batting average	26.05	33.75	26.05	29.91
100s/50s	0/1	1/6	0/1	1/6
Top score	57	135	57	135
Balls bowled	450	96	450	96
Wickets	9	5	9	5
Bowling average	39.44	27.80	39.44	27.80
5 wickets in innings	0	0	0	0
10 wickets in match	0	0	0	0
Best bowling	3/49	3/11	3/49	3/11
Catches/stumpings	5/–	8/–	5/–	12/–
- Source: ESPNcricinfo, 27 September 2026

Michael Levitt (born 19 June 2003) is a South African-Dutch cricketer who plays international cricket for the Netherlands. He currently holds the record for the highest score by a Dutch player in Twenty20 International cricket.

== Early life and career ==
Levitt was born in South Africa. His maternal grandfather was born in Harderwijk in the Netherlands, making Levitt eligible for a Dutch passport. He attended South African College High School in Cape Town, South Africa, where he played in the school's first eleven at the age of 14. After graduating from high school he began working as a gap PE teacher in London.

While living in England, Levitt played club cricket for Stanmore Cricket Club in the Middlesex Premier Cricket League and hoped to make a career in county cricket with Middlesex County Cricket Club. He was contacted by Ryan Cook, the coach of the Netherlands national cricket team, who had learned of his Dutch passport offered for him to play cricket for the Netherlands. As a result, Levitt moved to the Netherlands in March 2023 and began playing in the Dutch domestic system for Voorburg Cricket Club in The Hague. After just his first season in the country, in May 2023, Levitt was included in the Dutch squad for the 2023 Cricket World Cup Qualifier in Zimbabwe as a traveling reserve, but he was not required to play and was not included in the Netherlands' squad for the 2023 Cricket World Cup.

== International cricket ==
In January 2024, Levitt went on a pre-season camp with the Dutch team to the Gary Kirsten Cricket Academy in Cape Town, where he worked on his batting with fellow Dutch cricketer Max O'Dowd before playing his first international matches for the Netherlands in February 2024 in Nepal. He made his debuts in both One Day International (17 February) and Twenty20 International (28 February) cricket as part of the 2024 Nepal Tri-Nation Series. He scored a half-century in his first Twenty20 International against Nepal, becoming the second Dutch player to score a half-century on debut, and then in his second match scored 135 against Namibia, breaking the record for the highest score by a Dutch player in the format. Levitt played four matches for the Netherlands in the 2024 Men's T20 World Cup.

Levitt was an important player for the Netherlands in the 2025 Scotland Tri-Nation Series. In the Netherlands' Twenty20 match against Nepal on 16 June, Levitt hit the winning runs for the Netherlands in the third super over. This was the first time a men's professional cricket match had required three super overs to determine the winner. He was then given player-of-the-match awards on back-to-back days for scores of 90 against Scotland on 18 June and 86 against Nepal on 19 June.
