= Zach Lion-Cachet =

English-born cricketer

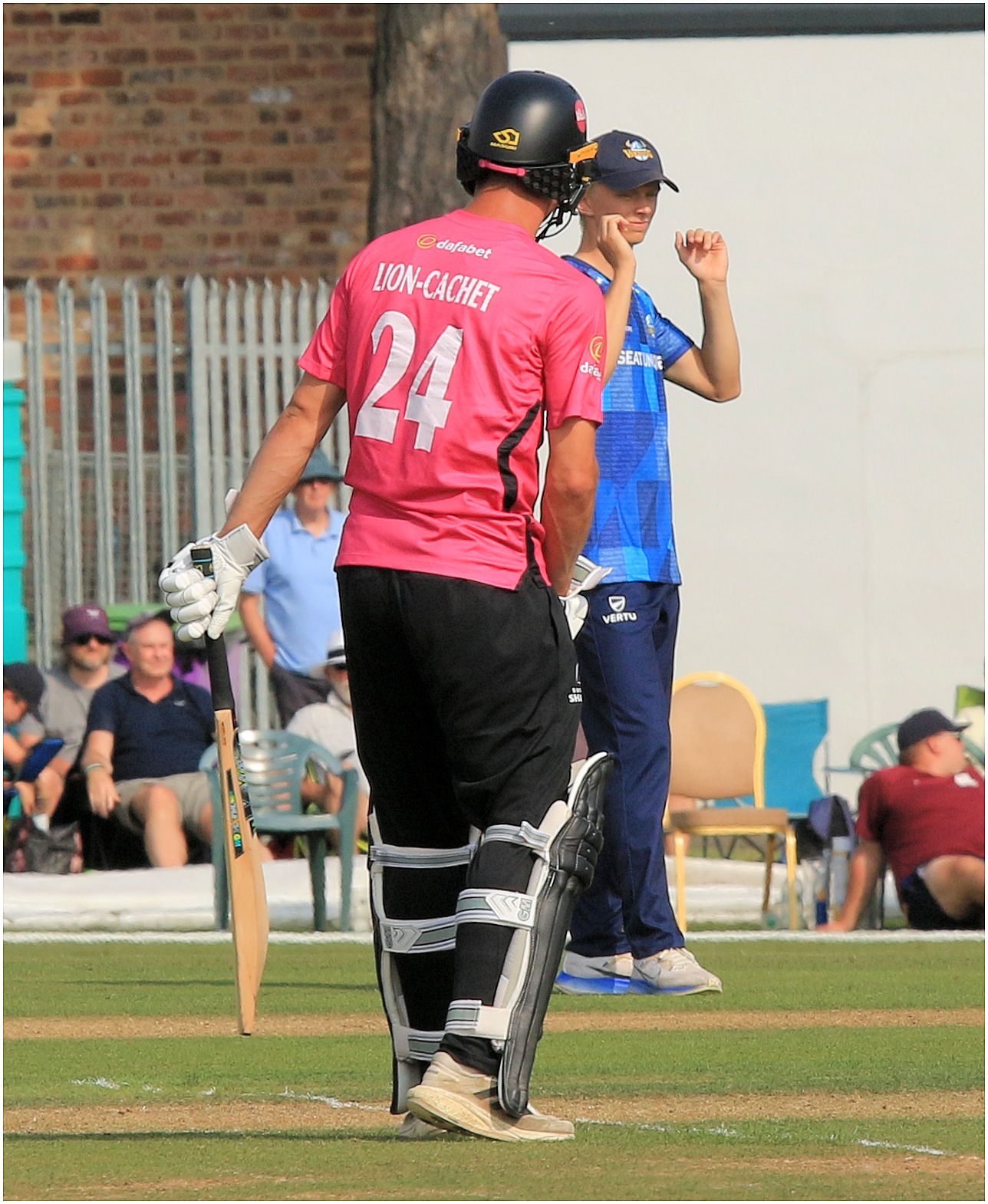
- Lion-Cachet batting for Sussex in 2024.

Personal information
- Full name: Zach Benjamin Lion-Cachet
- Born: 15 December 2003 (age 22); Oxford, Oxfordshire, England
- Batting: Right-handed
- Bowling: Right-arm off break
- Role: Batsman

International information
- National side: Netherlands (2024–present)
- ODI debut (cap 87): 5 March 2025 v Canada
- Last ODI: 31 July 2026 v Namibia
- T20I debut (cap 62): 23 August 2024 v Canada
- Last T20I: 18 February 2026 v India

Domestic team information
- Years: Team
- 2023–2024: Sussex (squad no. 24)

Career statistics
Competition	ODI	T20I	LA	T20
Matches	18	15	24	15
Runs scored	317	146	409	146
Batting average	19.81	12.16	18.59	12.16
100s/50s	0/1	0/1	0/1	0/1
Top score	78	50	78	50
Balls bowled	319	176	351	176
Wickets	11	8	12	8
Bowling average	24.45	25.75	24.66	25.75
5 wickets in innings	0	0	0	0
10 wickets in match	0	0	0	0
Best bowling	3/15	2/5	3/15	2/5
Catches/stumpings	8/–	3/–	10/–	3/–
- Source: ESPNcricinfo, 31 July 2026

Zach Benjamin Lion-Cachet (born 15 December 2003) is an English-born cricketer who plays for the Netherlands national team.

Lion-Cachet was born in England to a Dutch father and English mother. In August 2023, Lion-Cachet became the first player to score a century in all three formats of the game for Oxfordshire County Cricket Club.

He made his List A cricket debut for Sussex County Cricket Club on the 20 August 2023 against Worcester in the 2023 One-Day Cup. Lion-Cachet signed a rookie contract with Sussex County Cricket Club in October 2023, and in August 2024 he extended his contract until at least the end of the 2027 season.

In August 2024, he was named in the Netherlands' Twenty20 International (T20I) squad for a Tri-Nation Series against Canada and the United States. Lion-Cachet made his T20I debut on 23 August 2024, for the Netherlands against Canada.
