= Noah Croes =

Dutch cricketer (born 1999)

Personal information
- Full name: Noah Roderick Joseph Croes
- Born: 13 December 1999 (age 26); Amsterdam, Netherlands
- Batting: Right-handed
- Bowling: Right-arm medium
- Role: Batter

International information
- National side: Netherlands
- ODI debut (cap 83): 9 July 2023 v Sri Lanka
- Last ODI: 29 July 2026 v Nepal
- T20I debut (cap 57): 28 February 2024 v Nepal
- Last T20I: 18 February 2026 v India

Domestic team information
- Years: Team
- 2026: Dublin Guardians

Career statistics
Competition	ODI	T20I	LA	T20
Matches	27	21	27	25
Runs scored	538	228	538	285
Batting average	25.61	22.80	25.61	20.35
100s/50s	0/2	0/1	0/2	0/1
Top score	70	52*	70	52*
Catches/stumpings	18/–	17/–	18/–	20/–
- Source: ESPNcricinfo, 25 September 2026

Noah Roderick Joseph Croes (born 13 December 1999) is a Dutch cricketer.

== Career ==
Croes was born in Amsterdam to a Dutch father and Australian mother, who brought him up bilingual. He grew up in Melbourne, Australia. He played in the Victorian under-18 state championships in 2018 for the Inner East Emus, and scored a century in the final. He later represented Victoria in the Australian under-19 national championships. Croes played senior cricket in Victorian Premier Cricket for Melbourne University along Dutch international captain Scott Edwards. He scored his maiden century for the club in December 2021.

Croes spent the 2022 winter playing cricket in the United Kingdom, then in 2023 he returned to the Netherlands to live in The Hague and play for Voorburg Cricket Club. In May 2023, he was selected to play for the Dutch national side in the 2023 Cricket World Cup Qualifier. He played one match for the tournament, making his One Day International debut on 9 July 2023, against Sri Lanka. At this tournament, the Netherlands qualified for the 2023 Cricket World Cup, and in September 2023 Croes was named as travelling reserve for their squad. Ahead of the Netherlands' final match for the tournament against hosts India, he was brought into the 15-player squad to replace the injured Ryan Klein, but he didn't feature in the match.

In February 2024, Croes was selected in the Netherland's Twenty20 squad for the 2024 Nepal Tri-Nation Series. He made his Twenty20 International debut against Nepal at Kirtipur on 28 February 2024.
