= Kyle Klein =

Dutch cricketer (born 2001)

Personal information
- Born: 3 July 2001 (age 25)
- Batting: Right-handed
- Bowling: Right-arm medium
- Role: Bowler
- Relatives: Ryan Klein (brother)

International information
- National side: Netherlands (2024–present)
- ODI debut (cap 85): 17 February 2024 v Nepal
- Last ODI: 31 July 2026 v Namibia
- T20I debut (cap 60): 2 March 2024 v Nepal
- Last T20I: 18 February 2026 v India

Domestic team information
- Years: Team
- 2026: Amsterdam Flames

Career statistics
Competition	ODI	T20I	LA	T20
Matches	25	20	25	23
Runs scored	160	50	160	52
Batting average	14.54	6.25	14.54	5.77
100s/50s	0/0	0/0	0/0	0/0
Top score	25	16	25	16
Balls bowled	1,132	403	1,132	445
Wickets	45	31	45	35
Bowling average	20.35	17.48	20.35	17.40
5 wickets in innings	0	0	0	0
10 wickets in match	0	0	0	0
Best bowling	4/32	4/16	4/32	4/16
Catches/stumpings	3/–	2/–	3/–	2/–
- Source: Cricinfo, 25 September 2026

Kyle Klein (born 3 July 2001) is a South African-born Dutch cricketer. He has played for the Netherlands national cricket team since 2024 as a right-arm pace bowler. He is the younger brother of fellow Dutch international Ryan Klein.

== Personal life ==
Klein was born in South Africa and attended Rondebosch Boys' High School in Cape Town. He moved to the Netherlands, where his grandparents were born, in 2019.

== Domestic career ==
Klein plays Dutch club cricket for The Hague-based HBS Craeyenhout in the Topklasse. He has also played South African club cricket for the Western Province Cricket Club in Cape Town.

== International career ==
Klein represented the Netherlands national under-19 cricket team at the 2019 ICC U19 Cricket World Cup Europe Qualifier.

In September 2023, Klein was named as travelling reserve for the 2023 Cricket World Cup.

In February 2024, he was named in Dutch's squad for their One Day International (ODI) series against the host Nepal and Namibia for the League 2 matches, and in T20I squad for the 2024 Nepal Tri-Nation Series. He made his ODI debut on 17 February 2024, for Netherlands against the Nepal in Kirtipur. He made his Twenty20 International (T20I) debut against Nepal on 2 March 2024.

In May 2024, he was named as a reserve player in the Netherlands squad for the 2024 ICC Men's T20 World Cup tournament.

Klein was named in the Dutch squad for the 2026 ICC Men's T20 World Cup and made his World Cup debut in the opening game against Pakistan.
