= Ryan Klein =

South African-Dutch cricketer (born 1997)

Personal information
- Born: 15 June 1997 (age 29); Cape Town, South Africa
- Batting: Right-handed
- Bowling: Right-arm medium fast
- Role: Bowler
- Relatives: Kyle Klein (brother)

International information
- National side: Netherlands
- ODI debut (cap 77): 23 January 2022 v Afghanistan
- Last ODI: 31 July 2026 v Namibia
- T20I debut (cap 56): 4 August 2022 v New Zealand
- Last T20I: 19 June 2025 v Nepal

Domestic team information
- Years: Team
- 2019/20–2020/21: Western Province

Career statistics
Competition	ODI	T20I	FC	LA
Matches	15	8	7	24
Runs scored	46	102	23	127
Batting average	5.11	20.40	3.83	9.76
100s/50s	0/0	0/0	0/0	0/0
Top score	8*	36*	8	31*
Balls bowled	645	24	859	993
Wickets	12	1	28	19
Bowling average	44.66	45.00	11.42	43.31
5 wickets in innings	0	0	1	0
10 wickets in match	0	0	0	0
Best bowling	2/31	1/18	5/60	2/15
Catches/stumpings	3/–	4/–	3/–	6/–
- Source: Cricinfo, 31 July 2026

Ryan Klein (born 15 June 1997) is a South African-born Dutch cricketer. He has played for the Netherlands national cricket team since 2021. He is a right-arm fast-medium bowler.

== Personal life ==
Klein was born in Cape Town, South Africa. He holds a Dutch passport through descent. His younger brother Kyle Klein represented the Netherlands national under-19 cricket team at the 2019 ICC U19 Cricket World Cup Europe Qualifier.

== Domestic career ==
Klein made his first-class debut on 17 October 2019, for Western Province in the 2019–20 CSA 3-Day Provincial Cup. He made his List A debut on 27 October 2019, for Western Province in the 2019–20 CSA Provincial One-Day Challenge.

In the Netherlands, Klein has played Topklasse cricket for HBS Craeyenhout and Voorburg Cricket Club.

== International career ==
In May 2021, Klein was named in the Netherlands' A squad for their tour of Ireland. In January 2022, Klein was named in the Dutch One Day International (ODI) squad for their series against Afghanistan in Qatar. He made his ODI debut on 23 January 2022, for the Netherlands against Afghanistan. The following month, he was named in the Dutch Twenty20 International (T20I) squad for their tour of New Zealand. In August 2022, Klein was again named in the Dutch T20I squad, this time for a home series also against New Zealand. He made his T20I debut on 4 August 2022 against New Zealand.
