= Voorburg Cricket Club =

Cricket ground

Coordinates: 52.0676°N 4.3740°E

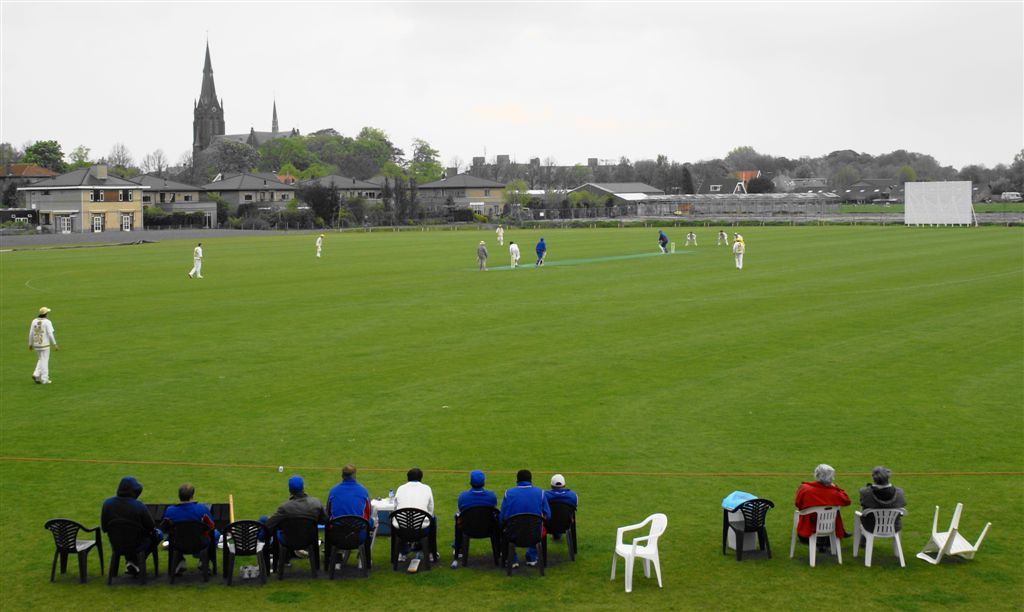
- Location: Voorburg, Netherlands
- Website: https://www.voorburgcc.nl/
- As of 7 July 2018

The Voorburg Cricket Club is a cricket club based in Voorburg, Netherlands. It plays home fixtures at Sportpark Westvliet, having previously played at Sportpark Duivesteijn until 2006. In July 2018, the club's ground was initially selected by the Koninklijke Nederlandse Cricket Bond (KNCB) as one of the two venues to host a One Day International (ODI) cricket match between the Netherlands and Nepal, in August 2018. However, the VRA Cricket Ground was later selected to host both fixtures. Since then Voorburg CC has hosted dozens of international cricket matches including T20Is versus New Zealand and One Day Internationals within the framework of the ICC Men's Cricket World Cup League 2.
