= Teja Nidamanuru =

Dutch cricketer

Personal information
- Full name: Anil Teja Nidamanuru
- Born: 22 August 1994 (age 32); Vijayawada, India
- Batting: Right-handed
- Bowling: Right-arm off break
- Role: Middle order batter

International information
- National side: Netherlands (2022–present)
- ODI debut (cap 80): 31 May 2022 v West Indies
- Last ODI: 12 June 2025 v Scotland
- T20I debut (cap 53): 11 July 2022 v PNG
- Last T20I: 3 September 2025 v Bangladesh

Domestic team information
- Years: Team
- 2017/18–2018/19: Auckland

Career statistics
Competition	ODI	T20I	LA	T20
Matches	41	26	42	31
Runs scored	893	244	907	250
Batting average	27.06	12.84	26.67	13.15
100s/50s	2/4	0/0	2/4	0/0
Top score	111	36	111	36
Balls bowled	6	24	18	108
Wickets	0	3	0	6
Bowling average	–	10.00	–	26.50
5 wickets in innings	–	0	–	0
10 wickets in match	–	0	–	0
Best bowling	–	3/30	–	3/30
Catches/stumpings	13/–	5/–	14/–	6/–
- Source: Cricinfo, 21 February 2026

Anil Teja Nidamanuru (born 22 August 1994) is an Indian-born Dutch cricketer who plays for the Netherlands cricket team. He has also played for Auckland in New Zealand domestic cricket.

== Personal life ==
Nidamanuru was born in Vijayawada, India. As of 2021 he was a business development manager for a workforce management company, working alongside fellow Netherlands international Stephan Myburgh.

== Cricket career ==
Nidamanuru made his Twenty20 debut for Auckland in the 2017–18 Super Smash on 13 December 2017. He made his List A debut for Auckland in the 2018–19 Ford Trophy on 14 November 2018.

In 2019, Nidamanuru moved to the Netherlands. He took up a position as player-coach at Utrecht-based Kampong Cricket Club. He later switched to Punjab Rotterdam and scored 104 runs from 42 balls in one game against VOC Rotterdam in the 2021 Dutch T20 Cup.

In May 2022, he was named in the Dutch One Day International (ODI) squad for their series against the West Indies. He made his ODI debut on 31 May 2022, for the Netherlands against the West Indies. In July 2022, he was named in the Netherlands' Twenty20 International (T20I) squad for the 2022 ICC Men's T20 World Cup Global Qualifier B tournament in Zimbabwe. He made his T20I debut on 11 July 2022, for the Netherlands against Papua New Guinea.

In March 2023, he was named in Dutch ODI squad for their series against Zimbabwe. In the first ODI, he scored his maiden century in ODI cricket. His score of 110 runs off 96 balls helped Netherlands to recover from 110/6 in their chase of the host's 249 and win the match by three wickets.

In May 2024, he was named in the Netherlands squad for the 2024 ICC Men's T20 World Cup tournament.
