= Scott Edwards (cricketer) =

Dutch cricketer

Personal information
- Full name: Scott Andrew Edwards
- Born: 23 August 1996 (age 30); Tonga
- Batting: Right-handed
- Role: Wicket-keeper

International information
- National side: Netherlands (2017–present)
- ODI debut (cap 66): 1 August 2018 v Nepal
- Last ODI: 31 July 2026 v Namibia
- ODI shirt no.: 35
- T20I debut (cap 39): 12 June 2018 v Ireland
- Last T20I: 18 February 2026 v India
- T20I shirt no.: 35

Domestic team information
- Years: Team
- 2023/24: Melbourne Renegades
- 2024/25: Victoria
- 2024: Biratnagar Kings
- 2026: Amsterdam Flames

Career statistics
Competition	ODI	T20I	FC	LA
Matches	76	86	1	86
Runs scored	2,391	1,316	5	2,555
Batting average	40.52	23.08	5.00	38.13
100s/50s	0/24	0/2	0/0	0/24
Top score	86	99	5	86
Catches/stumpings	73/12	69/11	5/1	86/13
- Source: Cricinfo, 31 July 2026

Scott Andrew Edwards (born 23 August 1996) is a Tongan-born cricketer who represents the Netherlands. Known for hitting his classic slog sweep shots against spinners, he made his first-class debut for the Netherlands against Namibia in the 2015–17 ICC Intercontinental Cup on 29 November 2017. He made his List A debut against Namibia in the 2015–17 ICC World Cricket League Championship on 8 December 2017. In June 2022, Edwards was named as the new captain of the Dutch cricket team, after Pieter Seelaar was forced to retire from international cricket due to a long-term back injury. Edwards is the Netherlands' seventh ODI captain.

== Early and domestic career ==
Edwards was born in Tonga, where his father was working at the time, but grew up in Australia and studied at Emmaus College, Melbourne. Both of his parents are Australian, but qualified for the Netherlands through his Dutch grandmother, and holds dual citizenship of Australia and the Netherlands. In Australia he has played club cricket for Richmond in Victorian Premier Cricket, and previously for Blackburn South Cricket Club and Highton Cricket Club. In Dutch club cricket, he plays for Excelsior '20. Throughout this period, Edwards formed a relationship with former Australian wicket-keeper Ryan Campbell, who later became head coach of the Netherlands Cricket Team in 2017. Edwards was an electrical apprentice before he began playing cricket professionally. He said "It was pretty surreal to be honest, was going about life as an apprentice and then all of a sudden you're playing international cricket coming up against Chris Gayle and Evin Lewis — it was pretty exciting".

In July 2019, Edwards was selected to play for the Rotterdam Rhinos in the inaugural edition of the Euro T20 Slam cricket tournament. However, the following month the tournament was cancelled.

In January 2024, Edwards was called up to play for Melbourne Renegades in the 2023–24 Big Bash League season to replace Joe Clarke.

== International career ==
In June 2018, he was named in the Netherlands' Twenty20 International (T20I) squad for the 2018 Netherlands Tri-Nation Series. He made his T20I debut for against Ireland on 12 June 2018.

In July 2018, he was named in the Netherlands' One Day International (ODI) squad, for their series against Nepal. He made his ODI debut against Nepal on 1 August 2018.

In July 2019, taking part in the 2019 European Cricket League, Edwards achieved the world record for the fastest T10 century and the highest individual T10 score, with 137 not out off 39 balls. He was in the Dutch squad for the 2019 ICC T20 World Cup Qualifier tournament in the United Arab Emirates. Ahead of that tournament, the International Cricket Council (ICC) named him as the player to watch in the Dutch squad. In April 2020, he was one of seventeen Dutch-based cricketers to be named in the team's senior squad. The following month, Edwards was named as the captain of the Netherlands A team ahead of their matches against the Ireland Wolves. In September 2021, Edwards was named in the Dutch squad for the 2021 ICC Men's T20 World Cup.

In June 2022, Edwards scored three consecutive ODI half centuries against England at VRA Ground, Amsterdam.

In July 2022, Netherlands beat USA in the semi-finals of the ICC Men's T20 World Cup Qualifier. This sent them through to Round 1 of the 2022 ICC Men's T20 World Cup in Australia. In October 2023, he played a match-winning knock of 78 for the Dutch to defeat South Africa by 38 runs in 2023 Cricket World Cup. Again when his team was in trouble vs Bangladesh he played match winning knock of 68 off 89 to defeat Bangladesh by 87 runs in Eden Gardens, Kolkata in 2023 Cricket World Cup

In May 2024, he was named as the captain of the Netherlands squad for the 2024 ICC Men's T20 World Cup tournament.

In October 2024 Edwards was asked to join the ICC Men's Cricket Committee, representing the ICC Associate Members.

== Personal life ==
In 2022, Edwards was studying for a Bachelor of Business (Sport Management) at Deakin University.
