= List of Netherlands One Day International cricket records =

One Day International (ODI) cricket is played between international cricket teams who are Full Members of the International Cricket Council (ICC) as well as the top four Associate members. Unlike Test matches, ODIs consist of one inning per team, having a limit in the number of overs, currently 50 overs per innings – although in the past this has been 55 or 60 overs. ODI cricket is List-A cricket, so statistics and records set in ODI matches also count in List-A cricket records. The earliest match recognised as an ODI was played between England and Australia in January 1971; since when there have been over 4,000 ODIs played by 28 teams. This is a list of Netherlands Cricket team's One Day International records. It is based on the List of One Day International cricket records, but concentrates solely on records dealing with the Netherlands cricket team. Netherlands played its first ever ODI in 1996.

== Key ==
The top five records are listed for each category, except for the team wins, losses, draws and ties, all round records and the partnership records. Tied records for fifth place are also included. Explanations of the general symbols and cricketing terms used in the list are given below. Specific details are provided in each category where appropriate. All records include matches played for Netherlands only, and are correct as of May 7, 2021.

Key
Symbol	Meaning
†	Player or umpire is currently active in ODI cricket
‡	Event took place during Cricket World Cup and World Cup Qualifier
*	Player remained not out or partnership remained unbroken
♠	One Day International cricket record
Date	Starting date of the match
Innings	Number of innings played
Matches	Number of matches played
Opposition	The team Netherlands was playing against
Period	The time period when the player was active in ODI cricket
Player	The player involved in the record
Venue	One Day International cricket ground where the match was played
YTL	Not lost a single match against an individual opponent
YTP	Not played series of matches there till date

== Team records ==
=== Overall Record ===
Matches	Won	Lost	Tied	NR	W/L ratio	Win %
146	54	85	2	5	0.649	39.36
Last Updated: 12 June 2025

Note: Tied matches considered as half win.

W/L ratio and win % excluded the matches which ended in No result.

=== Head to Head records ===
As of June 2025, Netherlands has played 146 ODI matches resulting in 54 Victories, 85 Defeats, 2 Ties and 5 No results for W/L ratio of 0.649 and an overall winning percentage of 39.36.

Opponent	Matches	Won	Lost	Tied	No Result	% Won	W/L ratio	First	Last
Full Members
Afghanistan	10	2	8	0	0	20	0.250	2009	2023
Australia	3	0	3	0	0	0.00	0.000	2003	2023
Bangladesh	3	2	1	0	0	66.66	2.000	2010	2023
England	7	0	7	0	0	0.00	0.000	1996	2023
India	3	0	3	0	0	0.00	0.000	2003	2023
Ireland	13	3	8	1	1	29.16	0.37	2006	2021
New Zealand	5	0	5	0	0	0.00	0.000	1996	2023
Pakistan	7	0	7	0	0	0.00	0.000	1996	2023
South Africa	8	1	6	0	1	14.28	0.166	1996	2023
Sri Lanka	6	0	6	0	0	0.00	0.000	2002	2023
West Indies	6	0	5	1	0	8.33	0.00	2007	2023
Zimbabwe	7	3	4	0	0	42.85	0.75	2003	2023
Associate Members
Bermuda	7	6	1	0	0	85.71	6.00	2006	2009
Canada	12	10	0	0	2	100.00	YTL	2006	2025
Kenya	10	7	3	0	0	70.00	2.33	2007	2014
Namibia	5	4	1	0	0	80.00	4	2003	2025
Nepal	7	3	4	0	0	42.85	0.75	2018	2025
Oman	3	1	2	0	0	33.33	0.50	2023	2024
Scotland	16	6	9	0	1	40.00	0.66	2006	2025
United Arab Emirates	5	3	2	0	0	60.00	1.50	1996	2025
United States	3	3	0	0	0	100.00	YTL	2023	2024
Total	146	54	85	2	5	39.36	0.649	1996	2025
Statistics are correct as of Scotland v Netherlands at Forthill Cricket Ground, Dundee, 2024–2026 Cricket World Cup League 2, June 12, 2025.

=== First bilateral ODI series wins ===
Opponent	Year of first Home win	Year of first Away win
Afghanistan	-	YTP
Bangladesh	YTP	2010
Bermuda	2007	YTP
Canada	2009	2007
Ireland	2021	-
Kenya	2008	-
Nepal	-	YTP
Scotland	2010	YTP
Sri Lanka	-	YTP
Zimbabwe	2019	YTP
Last updated: 9 July 2023

=== First ODI match wins ===
Opponent	Home		Away / Neutral	
Opponent	Venue	Year	Venue	Year
Afghanistan	Amstelveen	2009	Sharjah	2012
Australia	YTP		-	
Bangladesh	YTP		Glasgow	2010
Bermuda	Rotterdam	2007	Potchefstroom	2006
Canada	Amstelveen	2009	Potchefstroom	2006
England	-		-	
India	YTP		-	
Ireland	Utrecht	2021	Nairobi	2007
Kenya	Rotterdam	2008	Potchefstroom	2009 ‡
Namibia	YTP		Bloemfontein	2003 ‡
Nepal	Amstelveen	2018	Harare	2023 ‡
New Zealand	YTP		-	
Oman	YTP		Harare	2023 ‡
Pakistan	-		-	
Scotland	Rotterdam	2010	Basseterre	2007 ‡
South Africa	-		Dharamshala	2023 ‡
Sri Lanka	-		-	
United Arab Emirates	Amstelveen	2025	Al Amerat	2024
United States	The Hague	2024	Harare	2023 ‡
West Indies	-		Harare	2023
Zimbabwe	Deventer	2019	Harare	2023
Last updated: 12 June 2025

=== Team scoring records ===
==== Most runs in an innings ====
The highest innings total scored in ODIs has been scored England against Netharlands in the first ODI of the English cricket team in the Netherlands in 2022 earned 498 runs. The highest score in Netherlands ODI history for has been scored twice. First time against West Indies during 2023 Cricket World Cup Qualifier. Second time against Scotland on the sixth ODI in 2025 Scotland Tri-Nation Series. Both matches set their highest innings total of 374.

Rank	Score	Opposition	Venue	Date	Scorecard
1	374/9	West Indies	Takashinga Sports Club, Harare, Zimbabwe	26 June 2023 ‡	Scorecard
1	374/6	Scotland	Forthill Cricket Ground, Dundee, Scotland	12 June 2025	Scorecard
3	362/7	Oman	Harare Sports Club, Harare, Zimbabwe	3 July 2023 ‡	Scorecard
4	315/8	Bermuda	Hazelaarweg Stadion, Rotterdam, Netherlands	18 August 2007	Scorecard
4	315/6	Zimbabwe	Harare Sports Club, Harare, Zimbabwe	23 June 2023 ‡	Scorecard
Last updated: 12 June 2025

==== Fewest runs in an innings ====
The lowest innings total scored in ODIs has been scored twice. Zimbabwe were dismissed for 35 by Sri Lanka during the third ODI in Sri Lanka's tour of Zimbabwe in April 2004 and USA were dismissed for same score by Nepal in the sixth ODI of the 2020 ICC Cricket World League 2 in Nepal in February 2020. The lowest score in ODI history for Netherlands is 80 scored in the first match of the 2007 Quadrangular Series in Ireland against West Indies.

Rank	Score	Opposition	Venue	Date	Scorecard
1	80	West Indies	Clontarf Cricket Club Ground, Dublin, Ireland	10 July 2007	Scorecard
2	86	Sri Lanka	R. Premadasa Stadium, Colombo, Sri Lanka	16 September 2002	Scorecard
5	90	Australia	Arun Jaitley Stadium, Delhi, India	25 October 2023 ‡	Scorecard
4	91	Bermuda	Willowmoore Park, Benoni, South Africa	2 December 2006	Scorecard
5	105	Sri Lanka	Harare Sports Club, Harare, Zimbabwe	9 July 2023 ‡	Scorecard
Last updated: 25 October 2023

==== Most runs conceded an innings ====
The first ODI of the 2022 series against the England saw Netherlands concede their highest innings total of 498/4.

Rank	Score	Opposition	Venue	Date	Scorecard
1	498/4	England	VRA Cricket Ground, Amstelveen, Netherlands	17 June 2022	Scorecard
2	443/9	Sri Lanka	VRA Cricket Ground, Amstelveen, Netherlands	4 July 2006	Scorecard
3	410/4	India	M. Chinnaswamy Stadium, Bengaluru, India	12 November 2023	Scorecard
4	399/8	Australia	Arun Jaitley Stadium, Delhi, India	25 October 2023 ‡	Scorecard
5	380/9	Scotland	Sportpark Maarschalkerweerd, Utrecht, Netherlands	16 May 2025	Scorecard
Last updated: 12 June 2025

==== Fewest runs conceded in an innings ====
The lowest score conceded by Netherlands for a full inning is 67 scored by Canada in the Round 7 2011–2013 ICC World Cricket League Championship.

Rank	Score	Opposition	Venue	Date	Scorecard
1	67	Canada	Maple Leaf North-West Ground, King City, Canada	29 August 2013	Scorecard
2	106	Namibia	Wanderers Cricket Ground, Windhoek, Namibia	7 March 2025	Scorecard
3	112	Kenya	Sportpark Westvliet, Voorburg, Netherlands	3 July 2010	Scorecard
4	115	Bermuda	Hazelaarweg, Rotterdam, Netherlands	20 August 2007	Scorecard
5	120	Kenya	Gymkhana Club Ground, Nairobi, Kenya	18 February 2010	Scorecard
Last updated: 12 June 2025

==== Most runs aggregate in a match ====
The highest match aggregate scored in ODIs came in the match between South Africa and Australia in the fifth ODI of March 2006 series at Wanderers Stadium, Johannesburg when South Africa scored 438/9 in response to Australia's 434/4.

Rank	Aggregate	Scores	Venue	Date	Scorecard
1	764/14	England (498/4) v Netherlands (266)	VRA Ground, Amstelveen, Netherlands	17 June 2022	Scorecard
2	748/15	Netherlands (374/9) v West Indies (374/6)	Takashinga Sports Club, Harare, Zimbabwe	26 June 2023 ‡	Scorecard
3	743/12	Netherlands (374/6) v Scotland (369/6)	Forthill Cricket Ground, Dundee, Scotland	12 June 2025	Scorecard
4	691/19	Sri Lanka (443/9) v Netherlands (248)	VRA Cricket Ground, Amstelveen, Netherlands	4 July 2006	Scorecard
5	660/14	India (410/4) v Netherlands (250)	M. Chinnaswamy Stadium, Bengaluru, India	12 November 2023 ‡	Scorecard
Last updated: 12 June 2025

==== Fewest runs aggregate in a match ====
The lowest match aggregate in ODIs is 71 when USA were dismissed for 35 by Nepal in the sixth ODI of the 2020 ICC Cricket World League 2 in Nepal in February 2020. The lowest match aggregate in ODI history for Netherlands is 137 scored in the Round 7 2011–2013 ICC World Cricket League Championship against Canada, which is joint 17th lowest of all time.

Rank	Aggregate	Scores	Venue	Date	Scorecard
1	137/11	Canada (67) v Netherlands (70/1)	Maple Leaf North-West Ground, King City, Canada	29 August 2013	Scorecard
2	162/10	Netherlands (80) v West Indies (82/0)	Clontarf Cricket Club Ground, Dublin, Ireland	10 July 2007	Scorecard
3	185/13	Netherlands (91) v Bermuda (94/4)	Willowmoore Park, Benoni, South Africa	2 December 2006	Scorecard
4	231/12	Bermuda (115) v Netherlands (116/2)	Hazelaarweg, Rotterdam, Netherlands	20 August 2007	Scorecard
5	237/14	Netherlands (117) v Scotland (120/4)	Clontarf Cricket Club Ground, Dublin, Ireland	29 July 2008	Scorecard
Last updated: 12 June 2025

=== Result records ===
An ODI match is won when one side has scored more runs than the total runs scored by the opposing side during their innings. If both sides have completed both their allocated innings and the side that fielded last has the higher aggregate of runs, it is known as a win by runs. This indicates the number of runs that they had scored more than the opposing side. If the side batting last wins the match, it is known as a win by wickets, indicating the number of wickets that were still to fall.

==== Greatest win margins (by runs) ====
The greatest winning margin by runs in ODIs was England's victory over South Africa by 342 runs in the third ODI of the 2025 South Africa tour in England. The largest victory recorded by Netherlands, was the first ODI at the 2007 series against Bermuda by 172 runs.

Rank	Margin	Target	Opposition	Venue	Date
1	172 runs	316	Bermuda	Hazelaarweg, Rotterdam, Netherlands	18 August 2007
2	117 runs	290	Canada	Toronto Cricket, Skating and Curling Club, Toronto, Canada	3 July 2007
2	117 runs	230	Kenya	Sportpark Westvliet, Voorburg, Netherlands	3 July 2010
4	113 runs	273	United Arab Emirates	VRA Cricket Ground, Amstelveen, Netherlands	6 May 2025
5	87 runs	230	Bangladesh	Eden Gardens, Kolkata, India	28 October 2023 ‡
Last updated: 12 June 2025

==== Greatest win margins (by balls remaining) ====
The greatest winning margin by balls remaining in ODIs was England's victory over Canada by 8 wickets with 277 balls remaining in the 1979 Cricket World Cup. The largest victory recorded by Netherlands, which is the joint-15th largest victory, is on the Round 7 of 2011–2013 ICC World Cricket League Championship against Canada when they won by 9 wickets with 236 balls remaining.

Rank	Balls remaining	Margin	Opposition	Venue	Date
1	236	9 wickets	Canada	Maple Leaf North-West Ground, King City, Canada	29 August 2013
2	183	8 wickets	Bermuda	Hazelaarweg, Rotterdam, Netherlands	20 August 2007
3	157	8 wickets	Scotland	Warner Park Stadium, Basseterre, St Kitts and Nevis	22 March 2007 ‡
4	142	9 wickets	Afghanistan	Sharjah Cricket Stadium, Sharjah, United Arab Emirates	29 March 2012
5	137	7 wickets	Nepal	Takashinga Cricket Club, Harare, Zimbabwe	24 June 2023 ‡
Last updated: 24 June 2023

==== Greatest win margins (by wickets) ====
A total of 55 matches have ended with chasing team winning by 10 wickets with West Indies winning by such margins a record 10 times. Netherlands have won an ODI match by a margin of 9 wickets on 2 occasions.

Rank	Margin	Opposition	Venue	Date
1	9 wickets	Afghanistan	Sharjah Cricket Stadium, Sharjah, United Arab Emirates	29 March 2012
1	9 wickets	Canada	Maple Leaf North-West Ground, King City, Canada	29 August 2013
3	8 wickets	Bermuda	Sedgars Park, Potchefstroom, South Africa	28 November 2006
3	8 wickets	Canada	Ruaraka Sports Club Ground, Nairobi, Kenya	30 January 2007
3	8 wickets	Bermuda	Ruaraka Sports Club Ground, Nairobi, Kenya	4 February 2007
3	8 wickets	Scotland	Warner Park Stadium, Basseterre, St Kitts and Nevis	22 March 2007 ‡
3	8 wickets	Bermuda	Hazelaarweg, Rotterdam, Netherlands	20 August 2007
3	8 wickets	Canada	Bay Oval, Tauranga, New Zealand	28 January 2014
3	8 wickets	Nepal	Tribhuvan University International Cricket Ground, Kirtipur, Nepal	25 February 2024
Last updated: 25 February 2024

==== Highest successful run chases ====
South Africa holds the record for the highest successful run chase which they achieved when they scored 438/9 in response to Australia's 434/9. Netherlands' highest innings total while chasing is 374/9 in a successful run chase against West Indies at Harare in June 2023. The match was tied and went into a super over which the Netherlands won. This was the second highest successful run chase in ODI cricket ever.

Rank	Score	Target	Opposition	Venue	Date
1	374/9	375	West Indies	Takashinga Cricket Club, Harare, Zimbabwe	26 June 2023
2	291/7	291	Zimbabwe	Sportpark Het Schootsveld, Deventer, Netherlands	21 June 2019
3	278/6	278	Scotland	Queens Sports Club, Bulawayo, Zimbabwe	6 July 2023 ‡
4	255/7	250	Zimbabwe	Harare Sports Club, Harare, Zimbabwe	21 March 2023
5	248/3	248	Kenya	Senwes Park, Potchefstroom, South Africa	1 April 2009
Last updated: 28 Nov 2023

==== Narrowest win margins (by runs) ====
The narrowest run margin victory is by 1 run which has been achieved in 36 ODI's with Australia winning such games a record 6 times. Netherlands has achieved victory by 1 run one time.

Rank	Margin	Opposition	Venue	Date
1	1 run	Ireland	Sportpark Maarschalkerweerd, Utrecht, Netherlands	2 June 2021
2	6 runs	Ireland	Jaffery Sports Club Ground, Nairobi, Kenya	5 February 2007
3	8 runs	Afghanistan	VRA Cricket Ground, Amstelveen, Netherlands	30 August 2009
4	14 runs	Scotland	Hazelaarweg Stadion, Rotterdam, Netherlands	19 May 2021
5	17 runs	Canada	Sedgars Park, Potchefstroom, South Africa	26 November 2006
Last updated: 12 June 2025

==== Narrowest win margins (by balls remaining) ====
The narrowest winning margin by balls remaining in ODIs is by winning of the last ball which has been achieved 36 times with both South Africa winning seven times. Netherlands has achieved victory by 1 ball when they defeated Zimbabwe during the 2023 Tour first match in Harare, Zimbabwe in March 2023.

Rank	Ball(s) remaining	Margin	Opposition	Venue	Date
1	1	3 wickets	Zimbabwe	Harare Sports Club, Harare, Zimbabwe	21 March 2023
2	2	1 wicket	Canada	Willowmoore Park, Benoni, South Africa	1 December 2006
3	3	6 wickets	Scotland	Hazelaarweg Stadion, Rotterdam, Netherlands	15 June 2010
4	4	3 wickets	Zimbabwe	Sportpark Het Schootsveld, Deventer, Netherlands	21 June 2019
5	6	6 wickets	Kenya	Hazelaarweg Stadion, Rotterdam, Netherlands	21 August 2008
5	6	2 wickets	Kenya	Sportpark Westvliet, Voorburg, Netherlands	12 September 2011
Last updated: 9 July 2023

==== Narrowest win margins (by wickets) ====
The narrowest margin of victory by wickets is 1 wicket which has settled 55 such ODIs. Both West Indies and New Zealand have recorded such victory on eight occasions. Netherlands has won the match by a margin of one wicket on one occasions.

Rank	Margin	Opposition	Venue	Date
1	1 wicket	Canada	Willowmoore Park, Benoni, South Africa	1 December 2006
2	2 wickets	Kenya	Sportpark Westvliet, Voorburg, Netherlands	12 September 2011
3	3 wickets	Zimbabwe	Sportpark Het Schootsveld, Deventer, Netherlands	21 June 2019
3	3 wickets	Zimbabwe	Harare Sports Club, Harare, Zimbabwe	21 March 2023
4	4 wickets	Kenya	Sportpark Westvliet, Voorburg, Netherlands	13 September 2011
4	4 wickets	Ireland	Sportpark Maarschalkerweerd, Utrecht, Netherlands	27 June 2021
4	4 wickets	Scotland	Queens Sports Club, Bulawayo, Zimbabwe	6 July 2023 ‡
Last updated: 9 July 2023

==== Greatest loss margins (by runs) ====
Netherlands's biggest defeat by runs was against Australia at the 2023 Cricket World Cup in Delhi, India.

Rank	Margin	Opposition	Venue	Date
1	309 runs	Australia	Arun Jaitley Stadium, Delhi, India	25 October 2023 ‡
2	232 runs	England	VRA Cricket Ground, Amstelveen, Netherlands	17 June 2022
3	231 runs	South Africa	PCA Stadium, Mohali, India	3 March 2011 ‡
4	229 runs	Australia	Warner Park Stadium, Basseterre, St Kitts and Nevis	18 March 2007 ‡
5	221 runs	South Africa	Warner Park Stadium, Basseterre, St Kitts and Nevis	16 March 2007 ‡
Last updated: 25 October 2023

==== Greatest loss margins (by balls remaining) ====
The greatest winning margin by balls remaining in ODIs was England's victory over Canada by 8 wickets with 277 balls remaining in the 1979 Cricket World Cup. The largest defeat suffered by Netherlands was against West Indies in the first match of the 2007 Quadrangular Series in Ireland when they lost by 10 wickets with 213 balls remaining.

Rank	Balls remaining	Margin	Opposition	Venue	Date
1	213	10 wickets	West Indies	Clontarf Cricket Club Ground, Dublin, Ireland	10 July 2007
2	208	9 wickets	Nepal	Tribhuvan University International Cricket Ground, Kirtipur, Nepal	17 February 2024
3	202	9 wickets	Pakistan	Sinhalese Sports Club Ground, Colombo, Sri Lanka	21 September 2002
4	198	6 wickets	Bermuda	Willowmoore Park, Benoni, South Africa	2 December 2006
5	177	9 wickets	Ireland	Clontarf Cricket Club Ground, Dublin, Ireland	18 August 2010
Last updated: 17 February 2024

==== Greatest loss margins (by wickets) ====
Netherlands have lost an ODI match by a margin of 10 wickets on one occasions with was against West Indies in the first match of the 2007 Quadrangular Series in Ireland when they lost by 10 wickets with 213 balls remaining.

Rank	Margin	Opposition	Venue	Date
1	10 wickets	West Indies	Clontarf Cricket Club Ground, Dublin, Ireland	10 July 2007
2	9 wickets	Pakistan	Sinhalese Sports Club Ground, Colombo, Sri Lanka	21 September 2002
2	9 wickets	Ireland	Clontarf Cricket Club Ground, Dublin, Ireland	18 August 2010
2	9 wickets	Nepal	Tribhuvan University International Cricket Ground, Kirtipur, Nepal	17 February 2024
4	8 wickets	Pakistan	Gaddafi Stadium, Lahore, Pakistan	26 February 1996 ‡
4	8 wickets	Ireland	Sportpark Maarschalkerweerd, Utrecht, Netherlands	4 June 2021
4	8 wickets	England	VRA Cricket Ground, Amstelveen, Netherlands	22 June 2022
4	8 wickets	South Africa	Willowmoore Park, Benoni, South Africa	31 March 2023
Last updated: 17 February 2024

==== Narrowest loss margins (by runs) ====
The narrowest loss of Netherlands in terms of runs is by 1 run suffered three times.

Rank	Margin	Opposition	Venue	Date
1	1 run	Ireland	Civil Service Cricket Club Ground, Belfast, Northern Ireland	11 July 2007
1	1 run	Nepal	VRA Cricket Ground, Amstelveen, Netherlands	3 August 2018
1	1 run	Zimbabwe	Harare Sports Club, Harare, Zimbabwe	23 March 2023
4	2 runs	Scotland	Jaffery Sports Club Ground, Nairobi, Kenya	2 February 2007
5	9 runs	Pakistan	Hazelaarweg Stadion, Rotterdam, Netherlands	21 August 2022
Last updated: 9 July 2023

==== Narrowest loss margins (by balls remaining) ====
The narrowest winning margin by balls remaining in ODIs is by winning of the last ball which has been achieved 36 times with both South Africa winning seven times. Netherlands has suffered loss by 1 ball remaining two times.

Rank	Balls remaining	Margin	Opposition	Venue	Date
1	1	4 wickets	Scotland	Cambusdoon New Ground, Ayr, Scotland	6 August 2006
1	1	1 wicket	Scotland	VRA Cricket Ground, Amstelveen, Netherlands	1 July 2010
3	8	6 wickets	England	New VCA Stadium, Nagpur, India	22 February 2011 ‡
4	11	5 wickets	Scotland	Mannofield Park, Aberdeen, Scotland	29 June 2011
4	11	7 wickets	West Indies	VRA Cricket Ground, Amstelveen, Netherlands	31 May 2022
Last updated: 8 July 2023

==== Narrowest loss margins (by wickets) ====
Netherlands has suffered defeat by 1 wicket one times with most recent being against Scotland during the 2010 ICC World Cricket League Division One.

Rank	Margin	Opposition	Venue	Date
1	1 wicket	Scotland	VRA Cricket Ground, Amstelveen, Netherlands	1 July 2010
2	4 wickets	Scotland	Cambusdoon New Ground, Ayr, Scotland	6 August 2006
2	4 wickets	Kenya	Bert Sutcliffe Oval, Lincoln, New Zealand	23 January 2014
4	5 wickets	Afghanistan	Hazelaarweg, Rotterdam, Netherlands	10 July 2010
4	5 wickets	India	Feroz Shah Kotla Stadium, New Delhi, India	9 March 2011 ‡
4	5 wickets	Scotland	Mannofield Park, Aberdeen, Scotland	29 June 2011
4	5 wickets	Afghanistan	Sharjah Cricket Stadium, Sharjah, United Arab Emirates	31 March 2012
4	5 wickets	West Indies	VRA Cricket Ground, Amstelveen, Netherlands	2 June 2022
4	5 wickets	Sri Lanka	Ekana Cricket Stadium, Lucknow, India	21 October 2023 ‡
Last updated: 21 October 2023

==== Tied matches ====
A tie can occur when the scores of both teams are equal at the conclusion of play, provided that the side batting last has completed their innings. There have been 43 ties in ODIs history with Netherlands involved in twice such games.

Opposition	Venue	Date
Ireland	VRA Cricket Ground, Amstelveen, Netherlands	9 July 2013
West Indies	Takashinga Sports Club, Harare, Zimbabwe	26 June 2023 ‡
Last updated: 9 July 2023

== Individual records ==
=== Batting records ===
==== Most career runs ====
A run is the basic means of scoring in cricket. A run is scored when the batsman hits the ball with his bat and with his partner runs the length of 22 yards (20 m) of the pitch. India's Sachin Tendulkar with 18,246 runs in ODIs is the leading run scorer followed by Kumar Sangakkara of Sri Lanka with 14,234 runs and Ricky Ponting from Australia with 13,704. Max O'Dowd is the highest Dutch batsmen on the list with 2,153 runs.

Rank	Runs	Player	Matches	Innings	Average	100	50	Period
1	2,153	Max O'Dowd†	65	64	35.88	1	15	2019–2025
2	2,108	Scott Edwards†	69	64	38.32	0	20	2018–2025
3	1,541	Ryan ten Doeschate	33	32	67.00	5	9	2007–2011
4	1,352	Wesley Barresi†	55	54	27.59	1	8	2010–2025
5	1,319	Tom Cooper	32	31	45.48	1	12	2010–2023
6	1,304	Vikramjit Singh†	46	45	29.63	1	8	2022–2025
7	1,239	Bas de Leede†	54	50	27.53	1	6	2018–2015
8	1,102	Eric Szwarczynski	41	40	29.78	0	10	2006–2014
9	1,097	Bas Zuiderent	57	56	23.84	0	8	1996–2011
10	1,004	Peter Borren	58	50	22.31	0	5	2006–2014
Last updated: 12 June 2025

==== Fastest runs getter ====
Runs	Batsman	Match	Innings	Record Date	Reference
1000	Ryan ten Doeschate	24	23	1 September 2009	
2000	Scott Edwards	66	61	15 May 2025	

==== Most runs in each batting position ====
Batting position	Batsman	Innings	Runs	Average	ODI Career Span	Ref
Opener	Max O'Dowd†	64	2,153	35.88	2019–2024	
Number 3	Tom Cooper†	19	859	50.52	2010–2023	
Number 4	Ryan ten Doeschate	19	942	67.28	2007–2011	
Number 5	Scott Edwards†	25	681	29.60	2021–2025	
Number 6	Scott Edwards†	18	546	42.00	2021-2023	
Number 7	Teja Nidamanuru†	10	357	44.62	2022–2025	
Number 8	Logan van Beek†	24	370	20.55	2021–2023	
Number 9	Roelof van der Merwe†	13	142	14.20	2023–2025	
Number 10	Aryan Dutt†	18	90	6.42	2022–2025	
Number 11	Paul van Meekeren†	16	75	6.81	2014–2025	
Last updated: 12 June 2025.

==== Most runs against each team ====
Opposition	Runs	Batsman	Matches	Innings	Career Span	Ref
Afghanistan	249	Tom Cooper†	4	3	2010–2012	
Australia	38	Tim de Leede	2	2	2003–2007	
Bangladesh	115	Wesley Barresi†	3	3	2010–2023	
Bermuda	346	Ryan ten Doeschate	7	7	2006–2009	
Canada	241	Eric Szwarczynski	5	5	2006–2014	
England	252	Scott Edwards†	4	4	2022–2023	
India	62	Daan van Bunge	1	1	2003–2003	
Ireland	237	Peter Borren	10	9	2006–2013	
Kenya	248	Bastiaan Zuiderent	7	7	2007–2010	
Namibia	134	Klaas-Jan van Noortwijk	1	1	2003–2003	
Nepal	136	Max O'Dowd†	5	5	2023–2025	
New Zealand	109	Michael Rippon†	3	3	2022–2022	
Oman	110	Vikramjit Singh†	1	1	2023–2023	
Pakistan	193	Tom Cooper†	3	3	2022–2022	
Scotland	371	Max O'Dowd†	7	7	2019–2025	
South Africa	125	Scott Edwards†	4	3	2021–2023	
Sri Lanka	85	Tim de Leede	3	3	2002–2006	
United Arab Emirates	185	Scott Edwards†	4	4	2024–2025	
West Indies	215	Max O'Dowd†	4	4	2022–2023	
Zimbabwe	343	Max O'Dowd†	6	6	2019–2023	
United States	67	Scott Edwards†	1	1	2023–2023	
Last updated: 12 June 2025

==== Highest individual score ====
The fourth ODI of the Sri Lanka's tour of India in 2014 saw Rohit Sharma score the highest Individual score. The highest runs for Netherlands earned during the 2024–2026 Cricket World Cup League 2 by Max O'Dowd, against Scotland.

Rank	Runs	Player	Opposition	Venue	Date
1	158*	Max O'Dowd	Scotland	Forthill, Dundee, Scotland	12 June 2025
2	137*	Wesley Barresi	Kenya	Bert Sutcliffe Oval, Lincoln, New Zealand	23 January 2014
3	134*	Klaas-Jan van Noortwijk	Namibia	Goodyear Park, Bloemfontein, South Africa	3 March 2003 ‡
4	123	Bas de Leede†	Scotland	Queens Sports Club, Zimbabwe	6 July 2023 ‡
5	121	Feiko Kloppenburg	Namibia	Goodyear Park, Bloemfontein, South Africa	3 March 2003 ‡
Last updated: 12 June 2025

==== Highest individual score – progression of record ====
Runs	Player	Opponent	Venue	Date
45	Peter Cantrell	New Zealand	Moti Bagh Stadium, Vadodara, India	17 February 1996 ‡
64	Klaas-Jan van Noortwijk	England	Arbab Niaz Stadium, Peshawar, Pakistan	22 February 1996 ‡
121	Feiko Kloppenburg	Namibia	Goodyear Park, Bloemfontein, South Africa	3 March 2003 ‡
134*	Klaas-Jan van Noortwijk	Namibia	Goodyear Park, Bloemfontein, South Africa	3 March 2003 ‡
137*	Wesley Barresi	Kenya	Bert Sutcliffe Oval, Lincoln, New Zealand	23 January 2014
158*	Max O'Dowd	Scotland	Forthill, Dundee, Scotland	12 June 2025
Last updated: 12 June 2025

==== Highest score against each opponent ====
Opposition	Runs	Player	Venue	Date	Ref
Afghanistan	101	Tom Cooper	Sportpark Westvliet, Voorburg, Netherlands	7 July 2010	
Australia	33	Daan van Bunge	Warner Park Stadium, Basseterre, St Kitts and Nevis	18 March 2007 ‡	
Bangladesh	67	Eric Szwarczynski	Titwood, Glasgow, Scotland	20 July 2010	
Bermuda	109*	Ryan ten Doeschate	Ruaraka Sports Club Ground, Nairobi, Kenya	4 February 2007	
Canada	96	Peter Borren	Toronto Cricket, Skating and Curling Club, Toronto, Canada	3 July 2007	
England	119	Ryan ten Doeschate	New VCA Stadium, Nagpur, India	22 February 2011 ‡	
India	62	Daan van Bunge	Boland Park, Paarl, South Africa	12 February 2003 ‡	
Ireland	106	Ryan ten Doeschate	Eden Gardens, Kolkata, India	18 March 2011 ‡	
Kenya	137*	Wesley Barresi	Bert Sutcliffe Oval, Lincoln, New Zealand	23 January 2014	
Namibia	134*	Klaas-Jan van Noortwijk	Goodyear Park, Bloemfontein, South Africa	3 March 2003 ‡	
Nepal	90	Max O'Dowd†	Harare Sport Club, Harare, Zimbabwe	24 June 2023 ‡	
New Zealand	67	Michael Rippon	Bay Oval, Mount Maunganui, New Zealand	29 March 2022	
Oman	110	Vikramjit Singh†	Harare Sport Club, Harare, Zimbabwe	3 July 2023 ‡	
Pakistan	89	Bas de Leede†	Hazelaarweg, Rotterdam, Netherlands	18 August 2023	
Scotland	158*	Max O'Dowd†	Forthill, Dundee, Scotland	12 June 2025	
South Africa	98	Eric Szwarczynski	VRA Cricket Ground, Amstelveen, Netherlands	31 May 2013	
Sri Lanka	67*	Scott Edwards†	Queens Sports Club, Bulawayo, Zimbabwe	30 June 2023 ‡	
United Arab Emirates	74	Scott Edwards†	VRA Cricket Ground, Amstelveen, Netherlands	6 May 2025	
West Indies	111	Teja Nidamanuru†	Harare Sport Club, Harare, Zimbabwe	26 June 2023 ‡	
Zimbabwe	110*	Teja Nidamanuru†	Harare Sport Club, Harare, Zimbabwe	21 March 2023	
Last updated: 12 June 2025

==== Highest career average ====
A batsman's batting average is the total number of runs they have scored divided by the number of times they have been dismissed.

Rank	Average	Player	Innings	Runs	Not out	Period
1	67.00	Ryan ten Doeschate	32	1,541	9	2006–2011
2	45.48	Tom Cooper†	31	1,319	2	2010–2023
3	38.32	Scott Edwards†	64	2,108	9	2018–2025
4	35.88	Max O'Dowd†	64	2,153	4	2019–2025
5	29.63	Vikramjit Singh†	45	1,304	1	2022–2025
Qualification: 20 innings. Last updated: 12 June 2025

==== Highest Average in each batting position ====
Batting position	Batsman	Innings	Runs	Average	Career Span	Ref
Opener	Max O'Dowd†	64	2,153	35.88	2019–2025	
Number 3	Tom Cooper†	19	859	50.52	2010–2023	
Number 4	Ryan ten Doeschate	19	942	67.28	2006–2007	
Number 5	Bas Zuiderent	13	274	30.44	2006–2011	
Number 6	Scott Edwards†	18	546	42.00	2021–2023	
Number 7	Peter Borren	12	233	23.30	2006–2013	
Number 8	Logan van Beek†	24	340	20.55	2021–2023	
Number 9	Jeroen Smits	6	84	42.00	2006–2009	
Number 10	Aryan Dutt†	14	82	8.20	2022–2023	
Number 11	Paul van Meekeren†	11	43	6.14	2014–2023	
Last updated: 12 June 2025. Qualification: Min 10 innings batted at position

==== Most half-centuries ====
A half-century is a score of between 50 and 99 runs. Statistically, once a batsman's score reaches 100, it is no longer considered a half-century but a century.

Sachin Tendulkar of India has scored the most half-centuries in ODIs with 96. He is followed by the Sri Lanka's Kumar Sangakkara on 93, South Africa's Jacques Kallis on 86 and India's Rahul Dravid and Pakistan's Inzamam-ul-Haq on 83.

Rank	Half centuries	Player	Innings	Period
1	20	Scott Edwards†	64	2018–2025
2	15	Max O'Dowd†	64	2019–2025
3	12	Tom Cooper†	31	2010–2023
4	10	Eric Szwarczynski	40	2006–2014
5	9	Ryan ten Doeschate	32	2006–2011
Last updated: 16 May 2024

==== Most centuries ====
A century is a score of 100 or more runs in a single innings.

Virat Kohli has also scored the most centuries in ODIs with 50. Sachin Tendulkar is second with 49 and Ricky Ponting with 30 hundreds is in third.

Rank	Centuries	Player	Innings	Runs	Period
1	5	Ryan ten Doeschate	32	1,541	2006–2011
2	2	Teja Nidamanuru†	36	842	2022–2025
3	1	Feiko Kloppenburg	6	165	2002–2003
3	1	Klaas-Jan van Noortwijk	9	322	1996–2003
3	1	Darron Reekers	19	481	2006–2009
3	1	Tom Cooper†	31	1,319	2010–2023
3	1	Wesley Barresi†	54	1,352	2010–2025
3	1	Vikramjit Singh†	45	1,304	2022–2025
3	1	Bas de Leede†	50	1,239	2022–2025
3	1	Max O'Dowd	64	2,153	2019–2025
Last updated: 12 June 2025

==== Most Sixes ====
Rank	Sixes	Player	Innings	Period
1	36	Max O'Dowd†	64	2019–2025
2	29	Ryan ten Doeschate	32	2006–2011
2	29	Teja Nidamanuru†	35	2022–2025
4	24	Bas De Leede†	50	2018–2025
5	21	Wesley Barresi†	54	2010–2025
Last updated: 6 June 2025

==== Most Fours ====
Rank	Fours	Player	Innings	Period
1	216	Max O'Dowd†	64	2019–2025
2	159	Scott Edwards†	64	2018–2025
3	143	Vikramjit Singh†	45	2022–2025
4	137	Wesley Barresi†	54	2010–2025
5	130	Ryan ten Doeschate	32	2006–2011
Last updated: 12 June 2025

==== Highest strike rates ====
Andre Russell of West Indies holds the record for highest strike rate, with minimum 500 balls faced qualification, with 130.22. Teja Nidamanuru is the Dutch with the highest strike rate.

Rank	Strike rate	Player	Runs	Balls Faced	Period
1	91.49	Teja Nidamanuru†	893	976	2022–2025
2	87.65	Scott Edwards†	2,108	2,405	2018–2025
3	87.70	Ryan ten Doeschate	1,541	1,757	2006–2011
4	85.37	Peter Borren	1,004	1,176	2006–2014
5	80.03	Logan van Beek†	477	596	2021–2023
Qualification= 500 balls faced. Last updated: 12 June 2025

==== Highest strike rates in an inning ====
James Franklin of New Zealand's strike rate of 387.50 during his 31* off 8 balls against Canada during 2011 Cricket World Cup is the world record for highest strike rate in an innings.

Rank	Strike rate	Player	Runs	Balls Faced	Opposition	Venue	Date
1	241.17	Edgar Schiferli	41	17	Bermuda	Potchefstroom Cricket Ground, Potchefstroom, South Africa	8 April 2009
2	213.33	Pieter Seelaar	32	15	Zimbabwe	Sportpark Het Schootsveld, Deventer, Netherlands	21 June 2019
3	205.26	Bas de Leede†	39	19	Oman	Harare Sport Club, Harare, Zimbabwe	3 July 2023 ‡
4	200.00	Logan van Beek†	28	14	West Indies	Harare Sport Club, Harare, Zimbabwe	26 June 2023 ‡
5	194.11	Saqib Zulfiqar †	33	17	Oman	Harare Sport Club, Harare, Zimbabwe	3 July 2023 ‡
Qualification= Minimum of 25 runs Last updated: 10 July 2023

==== Most runs in a calendar year ====
India's Sachin Tendulkar holds the record for most runs scored in a calendar year with 1894 runs scored in 1998.

Rank	Runs	Player	Matches	Innings	Year
1	697	Scott Edwards†	22	21	2023
2	641	Max O'Dowd†	22	22	2023
3	619	Scott Edwards	15	15	2022
4	589	Tom Cooper	10	10	2010
5	539	Vikramjit Singh†	19	19	2023
Last updated: 14 November 2023

==== Most runs in a series ====
The 2023 Cricket World Cup in India saw Virat Kohli set the record for the most runs scored in a single series scoring 765 runs.

Rank	Runs	Player	Matches	Innings	Series
1	408	Tom Cooper	6	6	2010 ICC World Cricket League Division One
2	326	Vikramjit Singh	8	8	2023 Cricket World Cup Qualifier
3	314	Scott Edwards	8	7	2023 Cricket World Cup Qualifier
4	307	Ryan ten Doeschate	6	6	2011 Cricket World Cup
5	300	Sybrand Engelbrecht	8	8	2023 Cricket World Cup
Last updated: 14 November 2023

==== Most ducks ====
A duck refers to a batsman being dismissed without scoring a run. Sanath Jayasuriya has scored the equal highest number of ducks in ODIs with 34 such knocks.

Rank	Ducks	Player	Matches	Innings	Period
1	9	Pieter Seelaar	57	39	2006–2022
2	7	Bastiaan Zuiderent	57	56	1996–2011
3	6	Wesley Barresi†	55	54	2010–2025
4	5	Vivian Kingma	22	10	2014–2025
4	5	Peter Borren	58	50	2006–2014
4	5	Bas de Leede†	54	50	2018–2025
5	4	Adeel Raja	21	12	2002–2011
5	4	Paul van Meekeren	22	19	2013–2025
5	4	Edgar Schiferli	30	22	2002–2013
5	4	Tim de Leede	29	25	1996–2007
5	4	Teja Nidamanuru†	41	37	2022–2025
5	4	Mudassar Bukhari	46	34	2007–2014
5	4	Aryan Dutt†	53	38	2021–2025
Last updated: 7 March 2025

== Bowling records ==
=== Most career wickets ===
A bowler takes the wicket of a batsman when the form of dismissal is bowled, caught, leg before wicket, stumped or hit wicket. If the batsman is dismissed by run out, obstructing the field, handling the ball, hitting the ball twice or timed out the bowler does not receive credit.

Sri Lanka's Muttiah Muralitharan has the most ODI wickets with 534.

Rank	Wickets	Player	Matches	Innings	Average	SR	Period
1	62	Aryan Dutt†	53	52	32.88	40.72	2021–2025
2	61	Paul van Meekeren†	39	38	27.47	30.67	2013–2025
3	57	Mudassar Bukhari	46	46	28.08	35.71	2007–2014
3	57	Pieter Seelaar	57	57	35.68	45.77	2006–2022
4	55	Ryan ten Doeschate	33	33	24.12	28.72	2006–2011
6	46	Logan van Beek†	33	33	35.04	37.23	2021–2023
6	46	Peter Borren	58	51	35.21	43.02	2006–2014
8	45	Bas de Leede†	54	41	32.40	32.73	2018–2025
9	40	Vivian Kingma†	30	30	28.85	34.10	2014–2025
10	35	Kyle Klein†	18	17	19.42	23.62	2024–2025
Last updated: 12 June 2025

=== Fastest wicket taker ===
Wickets	Bowler	Match	Record Date	Reference
50	Ryan ten Doeschate	28	22 February 2011	
Last updated: 20 May 2021

=== Most career wickets against each team ===
Opposition	Wickets	Player	Matches	Innings	Runs	Period	Ref
Afghanistan	8	Peter Borren	6	6	214	2009–2012	
Australia	4	Tim de Leede	2	2	74	2003–2007	
Bangladesh	4	Peter Borren	2	2	58	2010–2011	
Bermuda	15	Ryan ten Doeschate	7	7	241	2006–2009	
Canada	8	Edgar Schiferli	4	4	110	2007–2013	
Canada	8	Pieter Seelaar	3	3	111	2009–2014	
England	4	Aryan Dutt	4	4	199	2022–2023	
India	4	Tim de Leede	1	1	35	2003–2003	
Ireland	10	Mudassar Bukhari	8	8	319	2007–2013	
Kenya	14	Mudassar Bukhari	9	9	379	2008–2014	
Namibia	8	Aryan Dutt	2	2	75	2024–2024	
Nepal	6	Fred Klaassen	2	2	68	2018–2018	
New Zealand	7	Logan van Beek†	3	3	148	2022–2022	
Pakistan	9	Bas de Leede†	4	4	182	2022–2023	
Oman	3	Aryan Dutt†	1	1	31	2023–2023	
Scotland	10	Paul van Meekeren†	6	6	304	2021–2025	
South Africa	5	Fred Klaassen†	3	3	139	2021–2023	
Sri Lanka	5	Logan van Beek†	2	2	66	2023–2023	
United Arab Emirates	9	Kyle Klein	3	3	134	2024–2025	
West Indies	5	Bas de Leede†	4	4	184	2022–2023	
West Indies	5	Logan van Beek†	4	4	223	2022–2023	
Zimbabwe	10	Shariz Ahmad †	4	4	205	2022–2023	
Last updated: 12 June 2025

=== Best figures in an innings ===
Bowling figures refers to the number of the wickets a bowler has taken and the number of runs conceded. Sri Lanka's Chaminda Vaas holds the world record for best figures in an innings when he took 8/19 against Zimbabwe in December 2001 at Colombo (SSC). Aryan Dutt holds the Dutch record for best bowling figures.

Rank	Figures	Player	Opposition	Venue	Date
1	6/34	Aryan Dutt	Namibia	Tribhuvan University International Cricket Ground, Kirtipur, Nepal	19 February 2024
2	5/24	Timm van der Gugten	Canada	Maple Leaf North-West Ground, King City, Canada	29 August 2013
3	5/43	Shariz Ahmad †	Zimbabwe	Harare Sport Club, Harare, Zimbabwe	23 March 2023
4	5/52	Bas de Leede†	Scotland	Queens Sports Club, Bulawayo, Zimbabwe	6 July 2023 ‡
5	4/15	Pieter Seelaar	Canada	Maple Leaf North-West Ground, King City, Canada	29 August 2013
Last updated: 19 February 2024

=== Best figures in an innings – progression of record ===
Figures	Player	Opposition	Venue	Date
3/48	Steven Lubbers	New Zealand	Moti Bagh Stadium, Vadodara, India	17 February 1996 ‡
4/35	Tim de Leede	India	Boland Park, Paarl, South Africa	12 February 2003 ‡
4/31	Ryan ten Doeschate	Canada	Ruaraka Sports Club Ground, Nairobi, Kenya	30 January 2007
4/23	Edgar Schiferli	Kenya	Senwes Park, Potchefstroom, South Africa	19 April 2009
5/23	Timm van der Gugten	Canada	Maple Leaf North-West Ground, King City, Canada	29 August 2013
6/34	Aryan Dutt	Namibia	Tribhuvan University International Cricket Ground, Kirtipur, Nepal	19 February 2024
Last updated: 2 June 2021

=== Best Bowling Figure against each opponent ===
Opposition	Figures	Player	Venue	Date	Ref
Afghanistan	4/32	Peter Borren	Sharjah Cricket Stadium, Sharjah, United Arab Emirates	29 March 2012	
Australia	2/34	Tim de Leede	North West Cricket Stadium, Potchefstroom, South Africa	21 February 2003 ‡	
Bangladesh	3/30	Peter Borren	Titwood, Glasgow, Scotland	20 July 2010	
Bermuda	3/20	Ryan ten Doeschate	Hazelaarweg Stadion, Rotterdam, Netherlands	18 August 2007	
Canada	5/24	Timm van der Gugten	Maple Leaf North-West Ground, King City, Canada	29 August 2013	
England	3/16	Daan van Bunge	Buffalo Park, East London, South Africa	16 February 2003 ‡	
India	4/35	Tim de Leede	Boland Park, Paarl, South Africa	12 February 2003 ‡	
Ireland	4/56	Ryan ten Doeschate	Jaffery Sports Club Ground, Nairobi, Kenya	5 February 2007	
Kenya	4/23	Edgar Schiferli	Senwes Park, Potchefstroom, South Africa	19 April 2009	
Namibia	6/34	Aryan Dutt	Tribhuvan University International Cricket Ground, Kirtipur, Nepal	19 February 2024 ‡	
Nepal	4/24	Logan van Beek†	Takashinga Cricket Club, Harare, Zimbabwe	24 June 2023	
New Zealand	4/56	Logan van Beek†	Seddon Park, Hamilton, New Zealand	2 April 2022	
Oman	3/31	Aryan Dutt†	Harare Sport Club, Harare, Zimbabwe	3 July 2023 ‡	
Pakistan	3/50	Bas de Leede†	Hazelaarweg Stadion, Rotterdam, Netherlands	21 August 2023 ‡	
Scotland	5/52	Bas de Leede†	Queens Sports Club, Bulawayo, Zimbabwe	6 July 2023 ‡	
South Africa	3/72	Ryan ten Doeschate	PCA Stadium, Mohali, India	3 March 2011	
Sri Lanka	3/26	Logan van Beek†	Queens Sports Club, Bulawayo, Zimbabwe	30 June 2023 ‡	
United Arab Emirates	4/44	Kyle Klein†	Sportpark Maarschalkerweerd, Utrecht, Netherlands	12 May 2025	
West Indies	3/45	Pieter Seelaar	Feroz Shah Kotla Stadium, Delhi, India	28 February 2011 ‡	
Zimbabwe	5/43	Shariz Ahmad †	Harare Sport Club, Harare, Zimbabwe	23 March 2023	
Last updated: 12 May 2025

=== Best career average ===
A bowler's bowling average is the total number of runs they have conceded divided by the number of wickets they have taken. Afghanistan's Rashid Khan holds the record for the best career average in ODIs with 18.54. Joel Garner, West Indian cricketer, and a member of the highly regarded late 1970s and early 1980s West Indies cricket teams, is second behind Rashid with an overall career average of 18.84 runs per wicket. Mudassar Bukhari of Netherlands is the highest ranked Dutch when the qualification of 2000 balls bowled is followed.

Rank	Average	Player	Wickets	Runs	Balls	Period
1	28.08	Mudassar Bukhari	57	1,601	2,036	2007–2014
2	32.76	Aryan Dutt†	62	2,039	2,525	2021–2025
3	35.68	Pieter Seelaar	57	2,034	2,609	2006–2022
Qualification: 2,000 balls. Last updated: 12 June 2025

=== Best career economy rate ===
A bowler's economy rate is the total number of runs they have conceded divided by the number of overs they have bowled. West Indies' Joel Garner, holds the ODI record for the best career economy rate with 3.09. Netherlands's Pieter Seelaar, with a rate of 4.67 runs per over conceded over his 46-match ODI career, is the highest Dutch on the list.

Rank	Economy rate	Player	Wickets	Runs	Balls	Period
1	4.67	Pieter Seelaar	57	2,034	2,609	2006–2022
2	4.71	Mudassar Bukhari	57	1,601	2,036	2007–2014
3	4.84	Aryan Dutt†	62	2,039	2,525	2021–2025
Qualification: 2,000 balls. Last updated: 12 June 2025

=== Best career strike rate ===
A bowler's strike rate is the total number of balls they have bowled divided by the number of wickets they have taken. The top bowler with the best ODI career strike rate is Australian Ryan Harris with strike rate of 23.4 balls per wicket. Dutch Mudassar Bukhari is at 139th position in this list.

Rank	Strike rate	Player	Wickets	Runs	Balls	Period
1	35.71	Mudassar Bukhari	57	1,601	2,036	2007–2014
2	40.72	Aryan Dutt†	62	2,039	2,525	2021–2025
3	45.77	Pieter Seelaar	57	2,034	2,609	2006–2022
Qualification: 2,000 balls. Last updated: 10 June 2025

=== Most four-wickets (& over) hauls in an innings ===
Pakistan's Waqar Younis, Sri Lanka's Muttiah Muralitharan and Australia's Brett Lee leading this list in ODIs.

Rank	Four-wicket hauls	Player	Matches	Balls	Wickets	Period
1	3	Edgar Schiferli	30	1,294	33	2002–2013
1	3	Ryan ten Doeschate	33	1,580	55	2006–2011
1	3	Logan van Beek†	33	1,713	46	2021–2023
1	3	Kyle Klein†	18	827	35	2024–2025
2	2	Paul van Meekeren†	39	1,871	61	2013–2025
3	1	Feiko Kloppenburg	6	242	8	2002–2003
3	1	Michael Rippon	9	402	13	2013–2022
3	1	Timm van der Gugten	8	324	12	2012–2021
3	1	Adeel Raja	21	846	17	2002–2011
3	1	Tim de Leede	29	1,139	29	1996–2007
3	1	Peter Borren	58	1,979	46	2006–2014
3	1	Pieter Seelaar	57	2,609	57	2006–2022
3	1	Shariz Ahmad †	11	388	13	2022–2023
3	1	Bas de Leede†	54	1,473	45	2018–2025
Last updated: 10 June 2025

=== Most five-wicket hauls in a match ===
A five-wicket haul refers to a bowler taking five wickets in a single innings. The list of most five-wicket hauls is headed by Pakistan's Waqar Younis with 13 such hauls.

Rank	Five-wicket hauls	Player	Matches	Balls	Wickets	Period
1	1	Timm van der Gugten	15	552	14	2012–2025
1	1	Shariz Ahmad †	11	388	13	2022–2023
1	1	Bas de Leede†	54	1,473	45	2018–2025
1	1	Paul van Meekeren†	39	1,871	61	2013–2025
1	1	Aryan Dutt†	52	2,525	62	2021–2025
Last updated: 12 June 2025

=== Best economy rates in an inning ===
The best economy rate in an inning, when a minimum of 30 balls are delivered by the player, is West Indies player Phil Simmons economy of 0.30 during his spell of 3 runs for 4 wickets in 10 overs against Pakistan at Sydney Cricket Ground in the 1991-92 Australian Tri-Series. Billy Stelling holds the Dutch record during his spell in Quadrangular Series in Ireland in 2007 against Scotland at Stormont.

Rank	Economy	Player	Overs	Runs	Wickets	Opposition	Venue	Date
1	1.40	Billy Stelling	5	7	0	Scotland	Stormont, Belfast, Northern Ireland	13 July 2007
2	1.50	Billy Stelling	8	12	3	Scotland	Warner Park Stadium, Basseterre, St Kitts and Nevis	22 March 2007 ‡
2	1.50	Mudassar Bukhari	6	9	1	Canada	Maple Leaf North-West Ground, King City, Canada	29 August 2013
4	1.60	Ryan ten Doeschate	10	16	2	Bermuda	Hazelaarweg, Rotterdam, Netherlands	20 August 2007
5	1.80	Mudassar Bukhari	5	9	1	Bermuda	Hazelaarweg, Rotterdam, Netherlands	20 August 2007
Qualification: 30 balls bowled. Last updated: 7 June 2021

=== Best strike rates in an inning ===
The best strike rate in an inning, when a minimum of 4 wickets are taken by the player, is shared by Sunil Dhaniram of Canada, Paul Collingwood of England and Virender Sehwag of India when they achieved a strike rate of 4.2 balls per wicket.

Rank	Strike rate	Player	Wickets	Runs	Balls	Opposition	Venue	Date
1	7.0	Pieter Seelaar†	4	15	28	Canada	Maple Leaf North-West Ground, King City, Canada	29 August 2013
2	10.5	Ryan ten Doeschate	4	31	42	Canada	Ruaraka Sports Club Ground, Nairobi, Kenya	30 January 2007
3	10.8	Timm van der Gugten	5	24	54	Canada	Maple Leaf North-West Ground, King City, Canada	29 August 2013
4	12.00	Shariz Ahmad †	5	43	60	Zimbabwe	Harare Sport Club, Harare, Zimbabwe	23 March 2023
4	12.00	Bas de Leede†	5	52	60	Scotland	Queens Sports Club, Bulawayo, Zimbabwe	6 July 2023 ‡
5	13.25	Adeel Raja	4	42	53	Namibia	Goodyear Park, Bloemfontein, South Africa	3 March 2003 ‡
Last updated: 10 July 2023

=== Worst figures in an innings ===
The worst figures in an ODI came in the 5th One Day International between South Africa at home to Australia in 2006. Australia's Mick Lewis returned figures of 0/113 from his 10 overs in the second innings of the match. The worst figures by a Dutch is 0/81 that came off the bowling of Ahsan Malik in the only ODI of the South Africa's tour of Netherlands in 2013.

Rank	Figures	Player	Overs	Opposition	Venue	Date
1	0/108	Philippe Boissevain†	10.0	England	VRA Cricket Ground, Amstelveen, Netherlands	17 June 2022
2	0/81	Ahsan Malik	10.0	South Africa	VRA Cricket Ground, Amstelveen, Netherlands	31 May 2013
3	0/76	Berend Westdijk	9.0	South Africa	Punjab Cricket Association IS Bindra Stadium, Mohali, India	3 March 2011 ‡
4	0/74	Bernard Loots	9.4	England	New VCA Stadium, Nagpur, India	22 February 2011 ‡
4	0/74	Pieter Seelaar†	10.0	South Africa	Punjab Cricket Association IS Bindra Stadium, Mohali, India	3 March 2011 ‡
Last updated: 10 July 2023

=== Most runs conceded in a match ===
Mick Lewis also holds the dubious distinction of most runs conceded in an ODI during the aforementioned match. The Dutch record in ODIs is held by Peter Borren on his debut match in the first ODI against Sri Lanka at the VRA Cricket Ground in July 2006. He returned figures of 1/94 from his 10 overs.

Rank	Figures	Player	Overs	Opposition	Venue	Date
1	0/108	Philippe Boissevain†	10	England	VRA Cricket Ground, Amstelveen, Netherlands	17 June 2022
2	1/99	Pieter Seelaar†	10	England	VRA Cricket Ground, Amstelveen, Netherlands	17 June 2022
3	1/94	Peter Borren	10	Sri Lanka	VRA Cricket Ground, Amstelveen, Netherlands	4 July 2006
4	2/91	Billy Stelling	10	Sri Lanka	VRA Cricket Ground, Amstelveen, Netherlands	6 July 2006
5	1/89	Peter Borren	10	Australia	Warner Park Stadium, Basseterre, St Kitts and Nevis	18 March 2007 ‡
Last updated:10 July 2023

=== Most wickets in a calendar year ===
Pakistan's Saqlain Mushtaq holds the record for most wickets taken in a year when he took 69 wickets in 1997 in 36 ODIs. Netherlands's Ryan ten Doeschate has 23 wickets in 2007, that is the Dutch record.

Rank	Wickets	Player	Matches	Year
1	23	Ryan ten Doeschate	11	2007
2	16	Edgar Schiferli	6	2009
2	16	Mark Jonkman	9	2010
4	15	Logan van Beek†	12	2022
4	15	Bas de Leede†	7	2023
Last updated: 10 July 2023

=== Most wickets in a series ===
1998–99 Carlton and United Series involving Australia, England and Sri Lanka and the 2019 Cricket World Cup saw the records set for the most wickets taken by a bowler in an ODI series when Australian pacemen Glenn McGrath and Mitchell Starc achieved a total of 27 wickets during the series, respectively.

Rank	Wickets	Player	Matches	Series
1	22	Fred Klaassen†	15	2020–2023 ICC Cricket World Cup Super League
2	21	Logan van Beek†	15x	2020–2023 ICC Cricket World Cup Super League
3	15	Bas de Leede†	7	2023 Cricket World Cup Qualifier
4	14	Mudassar Bukhari	10	2011–2013 ICC World Cricket League Championship
5	13	Ryan ten Doeschate	5	2007 ICC World Cricket League Division One
Last updated: 10 July 2023

== Wicket-keeping records ==
The wicket-keeper is a specialist fielder who stands behind the stumps being guarded by the batsman on strike and is the only member of the fielding side allowed to wear gloves and leg pads.

=== Most career dismissals ===
A wicket-keeper can be credited with the dismissal of a batsman in two ways, caught or stumped. A fair catch is taken when the ball is caught fully within the field of play without it bouncing after the ball has touched the striker's bat or glove holding the bat, Laws 5.6.2.2 and 5.6.2.3 state that the hand or the glove holding the bat shall be regarded as the ball striking or touching the bat while a stumping occurs when the wicket-keeper puts down the wicket while the batsman is out of his ground and not attempting a run. Netherlands' Scott Edwards is 42nd in taking most dismissals in ODIs as a designated wicket-keeper Sri Lanka's Kumar Sangakkara and Australian Adam Gilchrist lead that category.

Rank	Dismissals	Player	Matches	Innings	Period
1	79	Scott Edwards†	69	68	2018–2025
2	48	Jeroen Smits	38	38	2003–2009
3	21	Wesley Barresi	55	20	2010–2025
4	18	Atse Buurman	17	11	2007–2011
5	3	Marcelis Schewe	5	5	1996–1996
Last updated: 16 May 2025

=== Most career catches ===
Edwards is 43rd in taking most catches in ODIs as a designated wicket-keeper, this list leader is Gilchrist, Sangakkara and South Africa's Mark Boucher.

Rank	Catches	Player	Matches	Innings	Period
1	67	Scott Edwards†	69	68	2018–2025
2	41	Jeroen Smits	38	38	2003–2009
3	15	Atse Buurman	17	11	2007–2011
4	13	Wesley Barresi	55	20	2010–2025
5	2	Marcelis Schewe	5	5	1996–1996
Last updated: 16 May 2025

=== Most career stumpings ===
India's MS Dhoni holds the record for the most stumpings in ODIs with 123 followed by Sri Lankans Sangakkara and Romesh Kaluwitharana.

Rank	Stumpings	Player	Matches	Innings	Period
1	12	Scott Edwards†	69	68	2018–2025
2	8	Wesley Barresi	55	20	2010–2025
3	7	Jeroen Smits	38	38	2003–2009
4	3	Atse Buurman	17	11	2007–2011
5	1	Marcelis Schewe	5	5	1996–1996
Last updated: 10 July 2023

== See also ==
- List of One Day International cricket records
- List of Netherlands Twenty20 International cricket records
