= Dutch cricket team in Kenya in 2009–10 =

Dutch cricket team in Kenya in 2009-10
	Netherlands	Kenya
- Dates: February 16 – February 23, 2010

One Day International series
- Results: 2-match series drawn 1–1
Most runs	Ryan ten Doeschate (118)	Rakep Patel (98)
Most wickets	Mark Jonkman (4)	Hiren Varaiya (5)
- Player of the series: ???

The Netherlands cricket team toured Kenya in 2010. They played two One Day Internationals and an Intercontinental Cup match against Kenya.

== Squads ==
Netherlands	Kenya
Peter Borren (Captain); Mudassar Bukhari; Atse Buurman (Wicketkeeper); Tom de Grooth; Tim Gruijters; Mark Jonkman; Alexei Kervezee; Mohammad Kashif; Edgar Schiferli; Pieter Seelaar; Eric Szwarczynski; Ryan ten Doeschate; Daan van Bunge; Bas Zuiderent; Peter Drinnen (Coach)	Morris Ouma (Captain/Wicketkeeper); Jimmy Kamande; Shem Obado; Alex Obanda; Collins Obuya; David Obuya; Nehemiah Odhiambo; Nelson Odhiambo; Lameck Onyango; Elijah Otieno; Rakep Patel; Tony Suji; Steve Tikolo; Hiren Varaiya; Eldine Baptiste (Coach)

== Intercontinental Cup Match ==
20 – 23 February
Scorecard

Netherlands	v	Kenya
385 (105.1 overs); RN ten Doeschate 212* (282); E Otieno 4/57 [25.1]		433 (110.0 overs); DO Obuya 115 (190); RN ten Doeschate 5/104 [23]
367/6d (53. overs); ES Szwarczynski 93 (165); E Otieno 3/59 [17]		320/5 (52.0 overs); RR Patel 87 (109); RN ten Doeschate 2/70 [15]

Kenya won by 5 wickets
Gymkhana Club Ground, Nairobi, Kenya
Umpires: SR Modi and Zameer Haider (PAK)

== ODI series ==
=== 1st ODI ===
16 February 2010
Scorecard

Netherlands; 219/9 (50 overs)	v	Kenya; 221/4 (34.5 overs)
Ryan ten Doeschate* 109 (121); Elijah Otieno 3/39 [10]		Rakep Patel 92 (98); Peter Borren 1/20 [4]

Kenya won by 6 wickets
Gymkhana Club Ground, Nairobi, Kenya
Umpires: Subhash Modi and Zameer Haider

=== 2nd ODI ===
18 February
Scorecard

Netherlands; 200 (48.4 overs)	v	Kenya; 120 (32.0 overs)
B Zuiderent 56 (88); HA Varaiya 4/33 [8.4]		JK Kamande 42 (73); M Bukhari 3/17 [7]

Netherlands won by 80 runs
Gymkhana Club Ground, Nairobi, Kenya
Umpires: SR Modi and Zameer Haider (PAK)

== Twenty20 ==
=== World Twenty20 Qualifier ===
In addition to the Dutch team touring Kenya, the two were also drawn in the same opening group of the 2010 ICC World Twenty20 Qualifier played in the United Arab Emirates.

11 February
Scorecard

Kenya; 130 (19.4 overs)	v	Netherlands; 133/3 (19.1 overs)
Jimmy Kamande 42 (33); Pieter Seelaar 4/19 (4 overs)		Eric Szwarczynski 45 (47); Lameck Onyango 2/17 (3 overs)

Netherlands won by 7 wickets
Sheikh Zayed Stadium, Abu Dhabi
Umpires: Jeff Luck (Nam) and Sarika Prasad (Sin)
Player of the match: Pieter Seelaar (Ned)
