= Bermudian cricket team in the Netherlands in 2007 =

	Bermuda	The Netherlands
- Dates: June 28 – July 4, 2007
Captains	Jeroen Smits	Ashish Bagai

One Day International series
- Results: The Netherlands won the 2-match series 2–0
Most runs	Lionel Cann (42); Steven Outerbridge (37); Dwayne Leverock (30)	Tom de Grooth (128); Alexei Kervezee (111); Mudassar Bukhari (61)
Most wickets	Dwayne Leverock (4); Irving Romaine (2); Ryan Steede (2)	Ryan ten Doeschate (5); Pieter Seelaar (4); Maurits Jonkman (3); Geert-Maarten Mol (3)
- Player of the series: Tom de Grooth (The Netherlands) and Dwayne Leverock (Bermuda)

The Bermudian cricket team toured the Netherlands during the 2007 season. They played a First-class match for the 2007-08 ICC Intercontinental Cup and two One Day Internationals. The Dutch team took an innings and 44 run win over Bermuda in the First-class game and won the ODI series 2–0.

== Squad lists ==
Bermuda Irving Romaine (c) Dwight Basden (c) Lionel Cann James Celestine Jekon Edness (wk) Dwayne Leverock Chris Lonsdale Roderick Masters George O'Brien Steven Outerbridge Arthur Pitcher Jacobi Robinson Ryan Steede	Netherlands squad Jeroen Smits (c/wk) Adeel Raja Peter Borren Atse Buurman Tom de Grooth Maurits Jonkman Alexei Kervezee Geert-Maarten Mol Mangesh Panchal Mudassar Bukhari Darron Reekers Edgar Schiferli Pieter Seelaar Ryan ten Doeschate Bas Zuiderent

== Intercontinental Cup match ==
June 28 - July 1
(Scorecard)

Bermuda	v	Netherlands
183 (59 overs); Irving Romaine 103 (127); Mangesh Panchal 11-2-34-5		410 (114.1 overs); Tom de Grooth 196 (299); Alexei Kervezee 69 (127); George O'Brien 32-4-116-5; Dwayne Leverock 29.1-6-124-3
183 (57.2 overs); Dwayne Leverock 52 (114); Mangesh Panchal 14-3-45-3; Edgar Schiferli 12-2-50-3

Netherlands won by an innings and 44 runs
VRA Ground, Amstelveen
Umpires: Charlie McElwee and Ian Ramage

== ODI series ==
=== 1st ODI ===
July 3
(scorecard)

Netherlands; 315/8 (50 overs)	v	Bermuda; 143 (38 overs)
Tom de Grooth 97 (97); Alexei Kervezee 62 (68); Mudassar Bukhari 61 (47); Dwayne Leverock 10-0-55-3		Steven Outerbridge 24 (31); Ryan ten Doeschate 7-1-20-3; Edgar Schiferli 8-2-18-3

Netherlands won by 172 runs
Hazelaarweg, Rotterdam
Umpires: Aleem Dar and Paul Baldwin

=== 2nd ODI ===
July 4
(scorecard)

Bermuda; 115 (43.4 overs)	v	Netherlands; 116/2 (19.3 overs)
Lionel Cann 21 (21); Maurits Jonkman 5.4-0-23-3		Alexei Kervezee 49* (59); Ryan Steede 6-0-32-1

Netherlands won by 8 wickets
Hazelaarweg, Rotterdam
Umpires: Aleem Dar and Paul Baldwin
