= Kenyan cricket team in the Netherlands in 2008 =

Kenyan cricket in the Netherlands in 2008
	Kenya	Netherlands
- Dates: 16 August 2008 – 21 August 2008
Captains	Steve Tikolo	Jeroen Smits

One Day International series
- Results: Netherlands won the 1-match series 1–0
Most runs	Steve Tikolo 34; Kennedy Otieno 29; Alex Obanda	Eric Szwarczynski 46; Bas Zuiderent 41; Tom de Grooth 17
Most wickets	Thomas Odoyo & Steve Tikolo & Jimmy Kamande 1	Pieter Seelaar 3 Mudassar Bukhari 1

The Kenya national cricket team toured the Netherlands in 2008. They played one first class match and One Day International against the Netherlands.

== Intercontinental Cup Match ==
16 August - 19 August
(scoreecard)

Netherlands	v	Kenya
126 (43.2 overs); Nick Statham 29 (95); Thomas Odoyo 3/16 (7.2 overs)		253 (79 overs); Morris Ouma 114 (198)
121 (43.1 overs); Atse Buurman 41 (73); Peter Ongondo 5/13 (12 overs)

Kenya won by an innings and 6 runs.
VRA Ground, Amstelveen, Netherlands
Umpires: Niels Bagh (DEN) & Mark Benson (ENG)
Player of the match: Morris Ouma

== Only ODI ==
21 August
(scorecard)

Kenya; 118/5 (24 overs)	v	Netherlands; 121/4 (23 overs)
Steve Tikolo 34 (32); Pieter Seelaar 3/22 (5 overs)		Eric Szwarczynski 46 (65); Thomas Odoyo 1/12 (3 overs)

Netherlands won by 6 wickets
VRA Ground, Amstelveen, Netherlands
Umpires: Niels Bagh (DEN) & Mark Benson (ENG)
Player of the match: Bas Zuiderent

- Netherlands won the toss and elected to field.
- Rain reduced play to 24 overs per side.
