= Quadrangular Series in Ireland in 2007 =

Quadrangular Series in Ireland
- Dates: July 10, 2007 – July 15, 2007
- Cricket format: One-Day International
- Tournament format(s): League
- Champions: West Indies
- Participants: Ireland; West Indies; Netherlands; Scotland
- Most runs: Chris Gayle (136)
- Most wickets: Majid Haq (7)

The Quadrangular Series in Ireland was a One Day International cricket tournament, contested between three associate nations (Ireland, Netherlands and Scotland) and one full member (the West Indies), from 10 to 15 July 2007, following the conclusion of the West Indies' tour of England. The matches were played in both Northern Ireland and the Republic of Ireland.

The tournament came three months after the World Cup which saw Ireland beat the Test nations Pakistan and Bangladesh, and tie with Zimbabwe, gaining themselves a right to be ranked on the official ICC ODI Championship. Ranked two places below the West Indies, Ireland intended to justify their place in the table. Their match against the West Indies was abandoned due to rain, but they beat the two fellow Associates Scotland and the Netherlands. Scotland was looking to return to their pre-World Cup form, having lost all three World Cup matches (including one to the Netherlands), however they ended the Ireland tournament with two losses and a rained out match. The Netherlands, with no major accolades to their name since winning the 2001 ICC Trophy suffered the same fate. The tournament was eventually won by the West Indies, thanks to a bonus point from their match against the Netherlands.

== Points table ==
Pos	Team	Pld	W	L	T	NR	BP	Pts	NRR	(Cricket West Indies)	(Ireland)	(Scotland)	(Netherlands)
1	West Indies	3	2	0	0	1	1	11	2.521	—	No result	W 4 wickets	W 10 wickets
2	Ireland	3	2	0	0	1	0	10	0.240	No result	—	W 23 runs	W 1 run
3	Scotland	3	0	2	0	1	0	2	−0.310	L 4 wickets	L 23 runs	—	No result
4	Netherlands	3	0	2	0	1	0	2	−1.637	L 10 wickets	L 1 run	No result	—

== Matches ==
10 July
(scorecard)

Netherlands; 80 (31.2 overs)	v	West Indies; 82/0 (14.3 overs)
Alexei Kervezee 22 (36); Dwayne Smith 4/8 (6 overs)		Chris Gayle 51* (45)

West Indies won by 10 wickets
Clontarf Cricket Club Ground, Dublin, Ireland
Umpires: Nigel Llong and Amiesh Saheba

11 July
(scorecard)

Ireland; 210/8 (50 overs)	v	Netherlands; 209/6 (50 overs)
Eoin Morgan 51 (112); Mudassar Bukhari 3/45 (9 overs)		Mudassar Bukhari 71 (114); Alex Cusack 1/14 (3 overs)

Ireland won by 1 run
Civil Service Cricket Club Ground, Stormont, Belfast, Northern Ireland
Umpires: Darrell Hair and Shahul Hameed

12 July
(scorecard)

Scotland; 152/7 (30 overs)	v	West Indies; 165/6 (29.5 overs)
Navdeep Poonia 40 (57); Daren Powell 3/38 (6 overs)		Chris Gayle 85* (94); Majid Haq 4/28 (6 overs)

West Indies won by 4 wickets (DL method)
Clontarf Cricket Club Ground, Dublin, Ireland
Umpires: Nigel Llong and Amiesh Saheba

- Match shortened due to rain; Duckworth-Lewis revised target to win: 165 runs in 30 overs for the West Indies.

13 July
(scorecard)

Scotland; 71/5 (22.2 overs)	v	Netherlands
Fraser Watts 19 (40); Ryan ten Doeschate 3/25 (8 overs)

No result
Civil Service Cricket Club Ground, Stormont, Belfast, Northern Ireland
Umpires: Darrell Hair and Shahul Hameed

- Rain stopped play after 22.2 overs, with play eventually being abandoned.

14 July
(scorecard)

Ireland; 84/4 (17.2 overs)	v	West Indies
Eoin Morgan 37* (55); Daren Powell 2/29 (7 overs)

No result
Clontarf Cricket Club Ground, Dublin, Ireland
Umpires: Nigel Llong and Amiesh Saheba

- Rain stopped play after 17.2 overs, with play eventually being abandoned.

15 July
(scorecard)

Ireland; 222/7 (50 overs)	v	Scotland; 199 (49.3 overs)
Niall O'Brien 72 (101); Majid Haq 3/59 (10 overs)		Ryan Watson 83 (130); Andre Botha 3/27 (9 overs)

Ireland won by 23 runs
Civil Service Cricket Club Ground, Stormont, Belfast, Northern Ireland
Umpires: Darrell Hair and Shahul Hameed
