= Scottish cricket team in the Netherlands in 2010 =

Tour made by the Scottish cricket team

	Scotland	Netherlands
- Dates: 10 June – 15 June 2010

One Day International series
- Results: Netherlands won the 1-match series 1–0
Most runs	Richie Berrington (84)	Ryan ten Doeschate (90)
Most wickets	Josh Davey (1); Matthew Parker (1); Richie Berrington (1); Gordon Drummond (1)	Adeel Raja (2)
- Player of the series: Tom Cooper (Ned)

The Scottish cricket team toured the Netherlands on 15 June 2010. The tour consisted of a single One Day International (ODI) and an Intercontinental Cup game against the Netherlands.

== Intercontinental cup match ==
10 – 13 June
Scorecard

Netherlands	v	Scotland
210 (90 overs); Wilfred Diepeveen 72* (141); Matthew Parker 4/69 (24 overs)		391 (133.2 overs); Richie Berrington 82 (161); Pieter Seelaar 3/67 (18.2 overs)
257 (96.2 overs); Peter Borren 109 (192); Richie Berrington 3/48 (17 overs)		77/6 (24.2 overs); Majid Haq 34* (31); Mark Jonkman 5/21 (12 overs)

Scotland won by 4 wickets
Sportpark Het Schootsveld, Deventer, the Netherlands
Umpires: (Denmark) Niels Bagh and (South Africa) Brian Jerling

- Scotland won the toss and elected to field.
- Points: Scotland 20, Netherlands 0

== Only ODI ==
15 June
Scorecard

Scotland; 235/6 (50 overs)	v	Netherlands; 236/4 (49.3 overs)
Richie Berrington 84 (92); Adeel Raja 2/16 (5 overs)		Ryan ten Doeschate 90 (102); Josh Davey 1/27 (7 overs)

Netherlands won by 6 wickets
Hazelaarweg Stadion, Rotterdam, Netherlands
Umpires: (Denmark) Niels Bagh and (South Africa) Brian Jerling
Player of the match: Tom Cooper

- Scotland won the toss and elected to bat.
- Tom Cooper (NED), Josh Davey, Gregor Maiden, Preston Mommsen and Matthew Parker (SCO) made their ODI debuts.
