= Bangladeshi cricket team in Scotland in 2010 =

Bangladesh cricket team in Scotland in 2010
| | Bangladesh | Scotland |
- Dates: 19 July – 19 July 2010

One Day International series

== ODI Series - Bangladesh v Scotland ==
=== Only ODI ===
19 July
Scorecard

| Scotland | v | Bangladesh |

Match abandoned without a ball bowled
Titwood, Glasgow
Umpires: Kumar Dharmasena (SL) and Ian Ramage

Bangladesh cricket team against Netherlands in Scotland in 2010
| | Bangladesh | Netherlands |
- Dates: 20 July – 20 July 2010
| Captains | Mashrafe Mortaza | Peter Borren |

One Day International series
- Results: Netherlands won the 1-match series 1–0
| Most runs | Imrul Kayes (53) | Eric Szwarczynski (67) |
| Most wickets | Nazmul Hossain (2); Shakib Al Hasan (2) | Peter Borren (3) |

The Bangladesh cricket team toured Scotland, playing one One Day International on 19 July 2010. Bangladesh played an additional ODI against the Netherlands on 20 July, also in Scotland.

== ODI Series - Bangladesh v Netherlands ==
=== Only ODI ===
20 July
Scorecard

| Bangladesh; 199/7 (30 overs) | v | Netherlands; 200/4 (28.5 overs) |
| Imrul Kayes 53 (50); Peter Borren 3/29 (6 overs) | | Eric Szwarczynski 67 (54); Nazmul Hossain 2/28 (6 overs) |

Netherlands won by 6 wickets
Titwood, Glasgow
Umpires: Kumar Dharmasena (SL) and Ian Ramage

- Netherlands won the toss and elected to field.
- Rain reduced the match to 30 overs per side.
