= List of Netherlands Twenty20 International cricket records =

A Twenty20 International (T20I) is a form of cricket, played between two of the international members of the International Cricket Council (ICC), in which each team faces a maximum of twenty overs. The matches have top-class status and are the highest T20 standard. The game is played under the rules of Twenty20 cricket. The first Twenty20 International match between two men's sides was played on 17 February 2005, involving Australia and New Zealand. Wisden Cricketers' Almanack reported that "neither side took the game especially seriously", and it was noted by Cricinfo that but for a large score for Ricky Ponting, "the concept would have shuddered". However, Ponting himself said "if it does become an international game then I'm sure the novelty won't be there all the time". This is a list of Netherlands cricket team's Twenty20 International records. It is based on the List of Twenty20 International records, but concentrates solely on records dealing with the Dutch men cricket team. Netherlands played its first Twenty20 game against Kenya in August 2008, and these records date from that game.

== Key ==
The top five records are listed for each category, except for the team wins, losses, draws and ties, all round records and the partnership records. Tied records for fifth place are also included. Explanations of the general symbols and cricketing terms used in the list are given below. Specific details are provided in each category where appropriate. All records include matches played for Netherlands only, and are correct as of April 2021.

Key
| Symbol | Meaning |
|---|---|
| † | Player or umpire is currently active in T20I cricket |
| ‡ | Even took place during a Cricket World Cup |
| * | Player remained not out or partnership remained unbroken |
| ♠ | Twenty20 International cricket record |
| Date | Starting date of the match |
| Innings | Number of innings played |
| Matches | Number of matches played |
| Opposition | The team Netherlands was playing against |
| Period | The time period when the player was active in ODI cricket |
| Player | The player involved in the record |
| Venue | Twenty20 International cricket ground where the match was played |
| YTP | Yet to Play |

== Team Records ==
=== Overall Record ===
| Matches | Won | Lost | Tied | NR | Win% |
|---|---|---|---|---|---|
| 80 | 41 | 34 | 2 | 3 | 54.54 |
As of 24 November 2021

=== Team wins, losses, draws and ties ===
As of April 2021, Netherlands has played 80 T20I matches resulting in 41 victories, 34 defeats, 2 ties and 3 no results for an overall winning percentage of 54.54.

| Opponent | Matches | Won | Lost | Tied | No Result | % Won |
|---|---|---|---|---|---|---|
Full Members
| Afghanistan | 4 | 2 | 2 | 0 | 0 | 50.00 |
| Bangladesh | 3 | 1 | 2 | 0 | 0 | 33.33 |
| England | 2 | 2 | 0 | 0 | 0 | 100.00 |
| Ireland | 12 | 7 | 4 | 0 | 1 | 63.63 |
| New Zealand | 1 | 0 | 1 | 0 | 0 | 0.00 |
| Pakistan | 1 | 0 | 1 | 0 | 0 | 0.00 |
| South Africa | 1 | 0 | 1 | 0 | 0 | 0.00 |
| Sri Lanka | 1 | 0 | 1 | 0 | 0 | 0.00 |
| Zimbabwe | 3 | 1 | 1 | 1 | 0 | 50.00 |
Associate Members
| Bermuda | 1 | 1 | 0 | 0 | 0 | 100.00 |
| Canada | 3 | 2 | 1 | 0 | 0 | 66.66 |
| Hong Kong | 2 | 1 | 1 | 0 | 0 | 50.00 |
| Kenya | 6 | 4 | 2 | 0 | 0 | 66.66 |
| Namibia | 1 | 1 | 0 | 0 | 0 | 100.00 |
| Nepal | 9 | 4 | 4 | 0 | 1 | 50.00 |
| Oman | 4 | 2 | 1 | 0 | 1 | 66.66 |
| Papua New Guinea | 2 | 1 | 1 | 0 | 0 | 50.00 |
| Scotland | 13 | 6 | 7 | 0 | 0 | 46.15 |
| Singapore | 1 | 1 | 0 | 0 | 0 | 100.00 |
| United Arab Emirates | 8 | 4 | 4 | 0 | 0 | 50.00 |
| Total | 75 | 39 | 32 | 1 | 3 | 54.86 |
Source: ESPN Cricinfo Statistics are correct as of Netherlands v Nepal, Final Match, April 24, 2021.

=== First bilateral T20I series wins ===
As of 24 April 2021

| Opponent | Year of first Home win | Year of first Away win |
|---|---|---|
| Bangladesh | - | YTP |
| Kenya | YTP | - |
| Nepal | 2015 | YTP |
| Scotland | YTP | - |
| United Arab Emirates | - | 2016 |
| Zimbabwe | - | YTP |
Source: ESPN Cricinfo

=== Team scoring records ===
==== Most runs in an innings ====
The highest innings total scored in T20Is has been scored twice. The first occasion came in the match between Afghanistan and Ireland when Afghanistan scored 278/3 in the 2nd T20I of the Ireland series in India in February 2019. The Czech Republic national cricket team against Turkey during the 2019 Continental Cup scored 278/4 to equal the record. The highest score for Netherlands is 209/7 scored against Nepal during the 4th match of the 2020–21 Nepal Tri-Nation Series.

As of 24 April 2021

| Rank | Score | Opposition | Venue | Date |
|---|---|---|---|---|
| 1 | 209/7 | Nepal | Tribhuvan University International Cricket Ground, Kirtipur, Nepal | 20 April 2021 |
| 1 | 206/3 | Bermuda | Dubai International Cricket Stadium, Dubai, UAE | 26 October 2019 |
| 2 | 199/6 | Zimbabwe | Hazelaarweg Stadion, Rotterdam, Netherlands | 23 June 2019 |
| 3 | 194/7 | Scotland | Malahide Cricket Club Ground, Dublin, Ireland | 16 September 2019 |
| 4 | 193/4 | Ireland | Sylhet International Cricket Stadium, Sylhet, Bangladesh | 21 March 2014 ‡ |
Source: ESPN Cricinfo

==== Fewest runs in an innings ====
The lowest innings total scored was by Turkey against Czech Republic when they were dismissed for 21 during the 2019 Continental Cup. The lowest score in T20I history for Netherlands is 39 scored against Sri Lanka in the 2014 ICC World Twenty20.

As of 24 April 2021

| Rank | Score | Opposition | Venue | Date |
|---|---|---|---|---|
| 1 | 39/10 | Sri Lanka | Zohur Ahmed Chowdhury Stadium, Chattogram, Bangladesh | 24 March 2014 ‡ |
| 2 | 86/10 | Ireland | Dubai International Cricket Stadium, Dubai, UAE | 13 February 2010 |
| 3 | 92/10 | Hong Kong | Dubai International Cricket Stadium, Dubai, UAE | 18 January 2017 |
| 4 | 93/10 | Pakistan | Lord's, London, England | 9 June 2009 |
| 5 | 94/10 | Oman | Al Amerat Cricket Stadium, Muscat, Oman | 9 October 2019 |
Source: ESPN Cricinfo

==== Most runs conceded an innings ====
The 2nd T20I of the 2019–20 Ireland Tri-Nation Series saw Scotland score 252/3, the highest total conceded by Netherlands.

As of 24 April 2021

| Rank | Score | Opposition | Venue | Date |
|---|---|---|---|---|
| 1 | 252/3 | Scotland | Malahide Cricket Club Ground, Dublin, Ireland | 16 September 2019 |
| 2 | 238/3 | Nepal | Tribhuvan University International Cricket Ground, Kirtipur, Nepal | 24 April 2021 |
| 3 | 221/3 | Scotland | VRA Cricket Ground, Amstelveen, Netherlands | 20 June 2018 |
| 4 | 206/6 | Nepal | Tribhuvan University International Cricket Ground, Kirtipur, Nepal | 20 April 2021 |
| 5 | 189/4 | Ireland | Sylhet International Cricket Stadium, Sylhet, Bangladesh | 21 March 2014 ‡ |
Source: ESPN Cricinfo

==== Fewest runs conceded in an innings ====
The lowest score conceded by Netherlands for a full inning is 69 when they dismissed Nepal during the 2nd T20I of Nepal tour of Netherlands in 2015.

As of 24 April 2021

| Rank | Score | Opposition | Venue | Date |
|---|---|---|---|---|
| 1 | 69/10 | Nepal | VRA Cricket Ground, Amstelveen, Netherlands | 1 July 2015 |
| 2 | 73/10 | United Arab Emirates | ICC Academy Ground, Dubai, UAE | 3 February 2016 |
| 3 | 80/9 | United Arab Emirates | Dubai International Cricket Stadium, Dubai, UAE | 29 October 2019 |
| 4 | 88/10 | England | Zohur Ahmed Chowdhury Stadium, Chattogram, Bangladesh | 31 March 2014 ‡ |
| 5 | 90/10 | Afghanistan | Sharjah Cricket Stadium, Sharjah, UAE | 15 November 2013 |
Source: ESPN Cricinfo

==== Most runs aggregate in a match ====
The highest match aggregate scored in T20Is came in the match between India and West Indies in the first T20I of the August 2016 series at Central Broward Regional Park, Lauderhill when India scored 244/4 in response to West Indies score of 245/6 to lose the match by 1 run. The highest aggregate involving Netherlands was 446 runs being scored in Dublin in the 2nd T20I of the 2019-20 Ireland Tri-Nation series.

As of 24 April 2021

| Rank | Aggregate | Scores | Venue | Date |
|---|---|---|---|---|
| 1 | 446/10 | Scotland (252/3) v Netherlands (194/7) | Malahide Cricket Club Ground, Dublin, Ireland | 16 September 2019 |
| 2 | 415/13 | Nepal (206/6) v Netherlands (209/7) | Tribhuvan University International Cricket Ground, Kirtipur, Nepal | 20 April 2021 |
| 3 | 382/8 | Ireland (189/4) v Netherlands (193/4) | Sylhet International Cricket Stadium, Sylhet, Bangladesh | 21 March 2014 ‡ |
| 4 | 367/10 | Netherlands (191/2) v Malaysia (176/8) | Tribhuvan University International Cricket Ground, Kirtipur, Nepal | 18 April 2021 |
| 5 | 365/18 | Netherlands (182/9) v Ireland (183/9) | Al Amerat Cricket Stadium, Muscat, Oman | 17 February 2019 |
Source: ESPN Cricinfo

==== Fewest runs aggregate in an innings ====
The lowest match aggregate in T20Is is 57 when Turkey were dismissed for 28 by Luxembourg in the second T20I of the 2019 Continental Cup in Romania in August 2019. The lowest match aggregate in T20I history for Netherlands is 79 scored against Sri Lanka during the 2014 ICC World Twenty20.

As of 24 April 2021

| Rank | Aggregate | Scores | Venue | Date |
|---|---|---|---|---|
| 1 | 79/11 | Netherlands (39) v Sri Lanka (40/1) | Zohur Ahmed Chowdhury Stadium, Chattogram, Bangladesh | 24 March 2014 ‡ |
| 2 | 106/12 | Netherlands (59/5) v Ireland (47/7) | Himachal Pradesh Cricket Association Stadium, Dharamshala, India | 13 March 2016 ‡ |
| 3 | 161/11 | United Arab Emirates (80/9) v Netherlands (81/2) | Dubai International Cricket Stadium, Dubai, UAE | 29 October 2019 |
| 4 | 182/13 | Afghanistan (90) v Netherlands (92/3) | Sharjah Cricket Stadium, Sharjah, UAE | 15 November 2013 |
| 5 | 189/13 | Netherlands (94) v Oman (95/3) | Al Amerat Cricket Stadium, Muscat, Oman | 9 October 2019 |
Source: ESPN Cricinfo

=== Result records ===
A T20I match is won when one side has scored more runs than the runs scored by the opposing side during their innings. If both sides have completed both their allocated innings and the side that fielded last has the higher aggregate of runs, it is known as a win by runs. This indicates the number of runs that they had scored more than the opposing side. If the side batting last wins the match, it is known as a win by wickets, indicating the number of wickets that were still to fall.

==== Greatest win margins (by runs) ====
The greatest winning margin by runs in T20Is was Czech Republic's victory over Turkey by 257 runs in the sixth match of the 2019 Continental Cup. The largest victory recorded by Netherlands was during the 2nd T20I of 2015 Nepal tour of Netherlands by 103 runs.

As of 24 April 2021

| Rank | Margin | Opposition | Venue | Date |
|---|---|---|---|---|
| 1 | 103 Runs | Nepal | VRA Cricket Ground, Amstelveen, Netherlands | 1 July 2015 |
| 2 | 92 Runs | Bermuda | Dubai International Cricket Stadium, Dubai, UAE | 29 October 2019 |
| 3 | 84 Runs | United Arab Emirates | ICC Academy Ground, Dubai, UAE | 3 February 2016 |
| 4 | 49 runs | Zimbabwe | Hazelaarweg Stadion, Rotterdam, Netherlands | 23 June 2019 |
| 5 | 45 Runs | England | Zohur Ahmed Chowdhury Stadium, Chattogram, Bangladesh | 31 March 2014 ‡ |
Source: ESPN Cricinfo

==== Greatest win margins (by balls remaining) ====
The greatest winning margin by balls remaining in T20Is was Austria's victory over Turkey by 104 balls remaining in the ninth match of the 2019 Continental Cup. The largest victory recorded by Netherlands is during the 2013 ICC World Twenty20 Qualifier against Afghanistan when they won by 7 wickets with 43 balls remaining.

As of 24 April 2021

| Rank | Balls remaining | Margin | Opposition | Venue | Date |
|---|---|---|---|---|---|
| 1 | 43 | 7 wickets | Afghanistan | Sharjah Cricket Stadium, Sharjah, UAE | 15 November 2013 |
| 2 | 37 | 6 wickets | Ireland | Sylhet International Cricket Stadium, Sylhet, Bangladesh | 21 March 2014‡ |
| 3 | 29 | 8 wickets | United Arab Emirates | Dubai International Cricket Stadium, Dubai, UAE | 29 October 2019 |
| 4 | 21 | 5 wickets | Singapore | ICC Academy Ground, Dubai, UAE | 22 October 2019 |
| 5 | 18 | 4 wickets | Scotland | Dubai International Cricket Stadium, Dubai, UAE | 27 October 2019 |
Source: ESPN Cricinfo

==== Greatest win margins (by wickets) ====
A total of 22 matches have ended with chasing team winning by 10 wickets with New Zealand winning by such margins a record three times. The highest win margin for Netherlands in T20 was by 8 wickets and they have won the match by this margin on 3 occasions.

As of 24 April 2021

| Rank | Margins | Opposition | Most recent venue | Date |
|---|---|---|---|---|
| 1 | 8 wickets | Scotland | Sheikh Zayed Cricket Stadium, Abu Dhabi, UAE | 28 November 2013 |
| 1 | 8 wickets | Oman | Al Amerat Cricket Stadium, Muscat, Oman | 15 February 2019 |
| 1 | 8 wickets | United Arab Emirates | Dubai International Cricket Stadium, Dubai, UAE | 29 October 2019 |
| 4 | 7 wickets | Kenya | Sheikh Zayed Cricket Stadium, Abu Dhabi, UAE | 11 February 2010 |
| 4 | 7 wickets | Afghanistan | Sharjah Cricket Stadium, Sharjah, UAE | 15 November 2013 |
| 4 | 7 wickets | United Arab Emirates | Grange Cricket Club, Edinburgh, Scotland | 12 July 2015 |
| 4 | 7 wickets | Scotland | Al Amerat Cricket Stadium, Muscat, Oman | 13 February 2019 |
| 4 | 7 wickets | Papua New Guinea | Dubai International Cricket Stadium, Dubai, UAE | 2 November 2019 |
Source: ESPN Cricinfo

==== Highest successful run chases ====
Australia holds the record for the highest successful run chase which they achieved when they scored 245/5 in response to New Zealand's 243/6. The highest successful chase for Netherlands was in the twelfth match of the 2014 ICC World Twenty20 against Ireland when they scored 193/4 to win by six wickets.

As of 24 April 2021

| Rank | Score | Target | Opposition | Venue | Date |
|---|---|---|---|---|---|
| 1 | 193/4 | 190 | Ireland | Sylhet International Cricket Stadium, Sylhet, Bangladesh | 21 March 2014‡ |
| 2 | 183/4 | 182 | Ireland | Malahide Cricket Club Ground, Dublin, Ireland | 18 September 2019 |
| 3 | 169/7 | 167 | Scotland | ICC Academy Ground, Dubai, UAE | 22 March 2012 |
| 4 | 167/2 | 167 | Oman | Al Amerat Cricket Stadium, Muscat, Oman | 15 February 2019 |
| 5 | 163/6 | 163 | England | Lord's, London, England | 5 June 2009 |
Source: ESPN Cricinfo

== See also ==
- List of Twenty20 International cricket records
- List of Netherlands One Day International cricket records
