= List of international cricket centuries by Ricky Ponting =

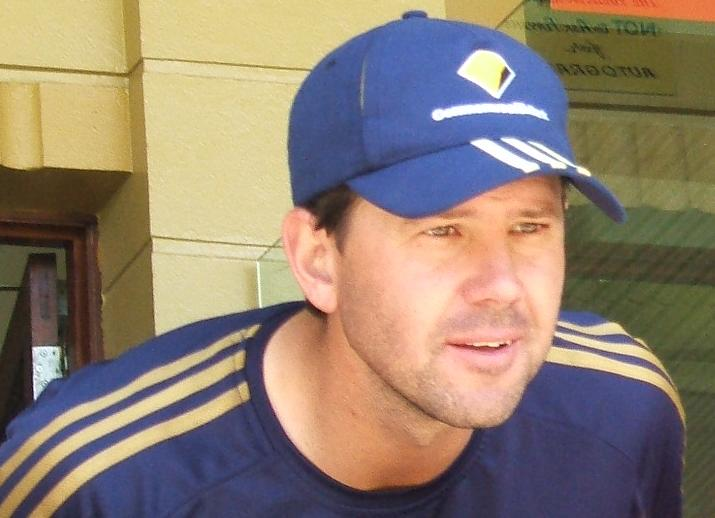
Ricky Ponting has scored 71 centuries in international cricket.

Ricky Ponting is a former Australian cricketer and captain of the Australia national cricket team. He has scored centuries (100 or more runs) on 41 occasions in Test cricket and 30 times in One Day International (ODI) matches, both of which are Australian records. In Test matches, Ponting has scored hundreds against all Test playing countries. He is the joint third (41) with Joe Root in the list of Test century-makers, behind Sachin Tendulkar (51) & Jacques Kallis (45). Ponting's first Test century was achieved against England at Headingley in 1997, when he scored 127. His highest innings is 257, scored against India in late-2003 at the Melbourne Cricket Ground. Ponting, among 41 centuries, has scored 6 double centuries, while his Test centuries have been made at 21 cricket grounds, including 15 at venues outside Australia. Ponting has been dismissed four times in the nineties, along with 96 on his Test debut. Ponting has scored centuries in both innings of a Test three times, equalling the record set by Sunil Gavaskar. This included a century in each innings of his 100th Test match thus becoming the only player in history to achieve that feat. In that match he also guided Australia to a successful run chase against South Africa on the final day. In 2006, Ponting scored seven centuries, the most by an Australian in a year.

In ODIs, Ponting has scored 30 centuries against 11 opponents. He has scored centuries against all cricketing nations that have permanent One Day International status and is the first ever batsman in the world to achieve this feat in ODI cricket history. His first ODI century was against Sri Lanka in the ninth match of the Benson & Hedges World Series, held in the Melbourne Cricket Ground in 1996. His highest ODI score is 164, which he scored against South Africa at the Wanderers Stadium, Johannesburg in 2006. This propelled Australia to a new ODI world record score, although this mark lasted only a few hours before South Africa overhauled their target in the last over of the match. He is fourth (30) in the list of ODI century-makers, behind Virat Kohli (54*), Sachin Tendulkar (49) and Rohit Sharma (33*). Ponting has scored 12 centuries at home grounds and 16 centuries at away or neutral venues. Seven centuries were hit at the Melbourne Cricket Ground. He has been dismissed four times in the 90's. Ponting previously held the highest score in a World Cup final with 140 not out against India in 2003, before it was broken by Adam Gilchrist in 2007. He has scored five World Cup centuries, along with Kumar Sangakkara, both are behind Tendulkar with six. His 145 against Zimbabwe in 1998 equalled Dean Jones' Australian record score, but this was surpassed in early-1999 by Adam Gilchrist's 154.

In September 2009, Ponting retired from Twenty20 international (T20I) cricket, failing to score a century in a T20I match. However, in the first International played, he hit 98 not out against New Zealand in Auckland.

Ricky Ponting has scored hundreds at each of the six prominent cricketing venues in Australia in both Tests and ODIs and is the only Australian to do so.

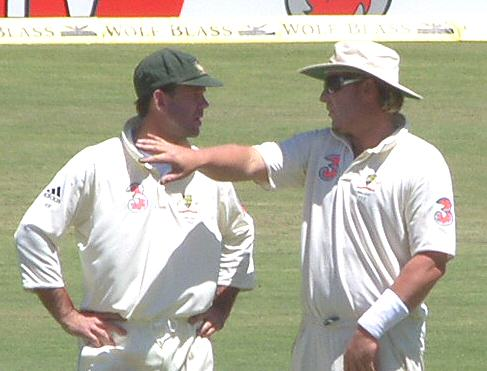
Ponting and Shane Warne during the 2006–07 Ashes series. The series saw Ponting score two centuries.

== Key ==
- * – Remained not out
- † – Man of the match
- ‡ – Captain of Australia in that match
- (D/L) – The result of the match was based upon the Duckworth–Lewis method

== Test cricket centuries ==
Test centuries scored by Ponting
No.	Score	Against	Pos.	Inn.	Test	Venue	H/A/N	Date	Result	Ref
1	127	England	6	2	4/6	Headingley, Leeds	Away	24 July 1997	Won	
2	105	South Africa	6	1	1/3	Melbourne Cricket Ground, Melbourne	Home	26 December 1997	Drawn	
3	104	West Indies	6	1	3/4	Kensington Oval, Bridgetown	Away	26 March 1999	Lost	
4	105* †	Sri Lanka	6	1	3/3	Sinhalese Sports Club Ground, Colombo	Away	30 September 1999	Drawn	
5	197 †	Pakistan	6	2	3/3	WACA, Perth	Home	26 November 1999	Won	
6	125	India	6	1	1/3	Adelaide Oval, Adelaide	Home	10 December 1999	Won	
7	141*	India	6	2	3/3	Sydney Cricket Ground, Sydney	Home	2 January 2000	Won	
8	144	England	3	1	4/5	Headingley, Leeds	Away	16 August 2001	Lost	
9	157* †	New Zealand	3	1	2/3	Bellerive Oval, Hobart	Home	22 November 2001	Drawn	
10	100*	South Africa	3	4	2/3	Newlands Cricket Ground, Cape Town	Away	8 March 2002	Won	
11	141	Pakistan	3	1	1/3	Saravanamuttu Stadium, Colombo	Neutral	3 October 2002	Won	
12	150	Pakistan	3	1	3/3	Sharjah Cricket Stadium, Sharjah	Neutral	19 October 2002	Won	
13	123	England	3	1	1/5	The Gabba, Brisbane	Home	7 November 2002	Won	
14	154 †	England	3	2	2/5	Adelaide Oval, Adelaide	Home	21 November 2002	Won	
15	117	West Indies	3	2	1/4	Bourda, Georgetown	Away	10 April 2003	Won	
16	206 †	West Indies	3	1	2/4	Queen's Park Oval, Port of Spain	Away	19 April 2003	Won	
17	113	West Indies	3	1	3/4	Kensington Oval, Bridgetown	Away	1 May 2003	Won	
18	169 †	Zimbabwe	3	2	2/2	Sydney Cricket Ground, Sydney	Home	17 October 2003	Won	
19	242	India	3	1	2/4	Adelaide Oval, Adelaide	Home	12 December 2003	Lost	
20	257 †	India	3	2	3/4	Melbourne Cricket Ground, Melbourne	Home	26 December 2003	Won	
21	207 ‡	Pakistan	3	2	3/3	Sydney Cricket Ground, Sydney	Home	2 January 2005	Won	
22	105 † ‡	New Zealand	3	2	3/3	Eden Park, Auckland	Away	26 March 2005	Won	
23	156 † ‡	England	3	4	3/5	Old Trafford, Manchester	Away	11 August 2005	Drawn	
24	149 † ‡	West Indies	3	1	1/3	The Gabba, Brisbane	Home	3 November 2005	Won	
25	104* † ‡	West Indies	3	3	1/3	The Gabba, Brisbane	Home	3 November 2005	Won	
26	117 ‡	South Africa	3	1	2/3	Melbourne Cricket Ground, Melbourne	Home	26 December 2005	Won	
27	120 † ‡	South Africa	3	2	3/3	Sydney Cricket Ground, Sydney	Home	2 January 2006	Won	
28	143* † ‡	South Africa	3	4	3/3	Sydney Cricket Ground, Sydney	Home	2 January 2006	Won	
29	103 ‡	South Africa	3	1	2/3	Kingsmead, Durban	Away	24 March 2006	Won	
30	116 ‡	South Africa	3	3	2/3	Kingsmead, Durban	Away	24 March 2006	Won	
31	118* ‡	Bangladesh	3	4	1/2	Fatullah Osmani Stadium, Fatullah	Away	9 April 2006	Won	
32	196 † ‡	England	3	1	1/5	The Gabba, Brisbane	Home	23 November 2006	Won	
33	142 † ‡	England	3	2	2/5	Adelaide Oval, Adelaide	Home	1 December 2006	Won	
34	140 ‡	India	3	2	4/4	Adelaide Oval, Adelaide	Home	24 January 2008	Drawn	
35	158 ‡	West Indies	3	1	1/3	Sabina Park, Kingston	Away	22 May 2008	Won	
36	123 ‡	India	3	1	1/4	M. Chinnaswamy Stadium, Bangalore	Away	9 October 2008	Drawn	
37	101 ‡	South Africa	3	1	2/3	Melbourne Cricket Ground, Melbourne	Home	26 December 2008	Lost	
38	150 † ‡	England	3	2	1/5	Sophia Gardens, Cardiff	Away	8 July 2009	Drawn	
39	209 † ‡	Pakistan	3	1	3/3	Bellerive Oval, Hobart	Home	14 January 2010	Won	
40	134	India	4	2	2/4	Sydney Cricket Ground, Sydney	Home	4 January 2012	Won	
41	221	India	4	1	4/4	Adelaide Oval, Adelaide	Home	24 January 2012	Won	

== One Day International centuries ==
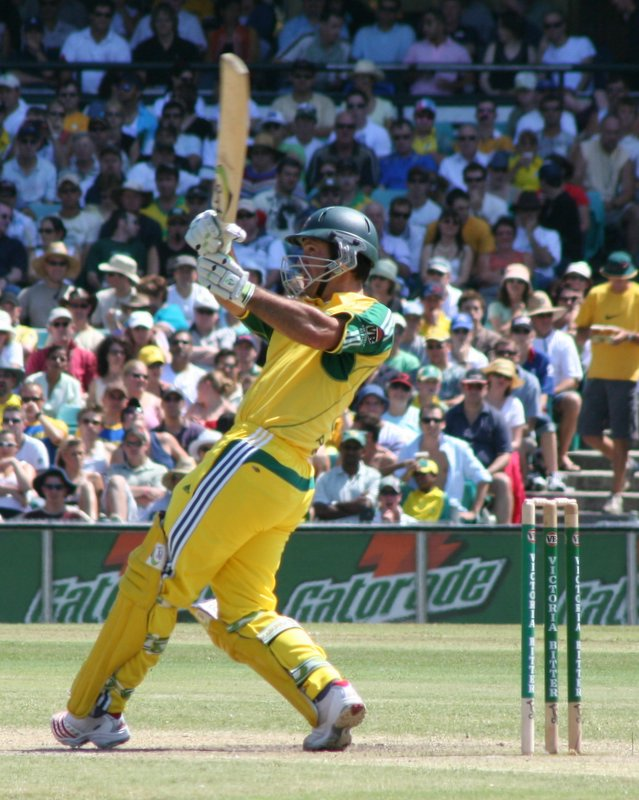
Ponting during his 124 against Sri Lanka on 12 February 2006 at the Sydney Cricket Ground

ODI centuries scored by Ponting
No.	Score	Against	Pos.	Inn.	S/R	Venue	H/A/N	Date	Result	Ref
1	123	Sri Lanka	4	1	89.13	Melbourne Cricket Ground, Melbourne	Home	9 January 1996	Lost	
2	102	West Indies	3	1	91.07	Sawai Mansingh Stadium, Jaipur	Neutral	4 March 1996	Lost	
3	100	New Zealand	3	1	87.71	Melbourne Cricket Ground, Melbourne	Home	21 January 1998	Lost	
4	145 †	Zimbabwe	3	1	91.77	Feroz Shah Kotla, New Delhi	Neutral	11 April 1998	Won	
5	124* †	Pakistan	3	2	96.12	Gaddafi Stadium, Lahore	Away	18 November 1998	Won	
6	115 †	India	3	1	95.04	Melbourne Cricket Ground, Melbourne	Home	12 January 2000	Won	
7	101	India	3	1	92.66	Indira Priyadarshini Stadium, Visakhapatnam	Away	3 April 2001	Won	
8	102 †	England	3	2	87.93	County Ground, Bristol	Away	10 June 2001	Won	
9	129 † ‡	South Africa	3	1	102.38	Mangaung Oval, Bloemfontein	Away	30 March 2002	Won	
10	119 ‡	England	3	1	96.74	Melbourne Cricket Ground, Melbourne	Home	15 December 2002	Won	
11	106* † ‡	Sri Lanka	3	2	109.27	Melbourne Cricket Ground, Melbourne	Home	21 January 2003	Won	
12	114 † ‡	Sri Lanka	3	1	104.58	SuperSport Park, Centurion	Neutral	7 March 2003	Won	
13	140* † ‡	India	3	1	115.70	Wanderers Stadium, Johannesburg	Neutral	23 March 2003	Won	
14	101 † ‡	Bangladesh	3	1	85.59	Marrara Oval, Darwin	Home	6 August 2003	Won	
15	108* ‡	India	3	1	104.85	M Chinnaswamy Stadium, Bangalore	Away	12 November 2003	Won	
16	115 † ‡	Asian XI	3	1	112.74	Melbourne Cricket Ground, Melbourne	Neutral	10 January 2005	Won	
17	141* † ‡	New Zealand	3	1	111.02	McLean Park, Napier	Away	5 March 2005	Won	
18	111 ‡	England	3	2	96.52	Lord's, London	Away	10 July 2005	Won	
19	124 ‡	Sri Lanka	3	1	97.63	Sydney Cricket Ground, Sydney	Home	12 February 2006	Won	
20	164 † (Note: Ponting shared the man of the match award with Herschelle Gibbs.) ‡	South Africa	3	1	156.19	Wanderers Stadium, Johannesburg	Away	12 March 2006	Lost	
21	111 † ‡	New Zealand	3	1	90.98	WACA, Perth	Home	28 January 2007	Won	
22	104 † ‡	New Zealand	3	2	92.03	Melbourne Cricket Ground, Melbourne	Home	4 February 2007	Won	
23	113 † ‡	Scotland	3	1	121.50	Warner Park, Basseterre	Neutral	14 March 2007	Won	
24	107* † ‡	New Zealand	3	2	99.07	Adelaide Oval, Adelaide	Home	14 December 2007	Won	
25	134* † ‡	New Zealand	3	1	100.75	Bellerive Oval, Hobart	Home	20 December 2007	Won	
26	124 † ‡	India	3	1	93.23	Sydney Cricket Ground, Sydney	Home	24 February 2008	Won	
27	126 † ‡	England	3	2	115.59	Trent Bridge, Nottingham	Away	15 September 2009	Won	
28	111* ‡	England	3	2	96.52	SuperSport Park, Centurion	Neutral	2 October 2009	Won	
29	106* † ‡	West Indies	3	1	94.64	The Gabba, Brisbane	Home	14 February 2010	Won	
30	104 ‡	India	3	1	88.13	Sardar Patel Stadium, Motera, Ahmedabad	Away	24 March 2011	Lost	
