= Tom de Grooth =

Dutch cricketer (born 1979)

Personal information
- Full name: Tom Nico de Grooth
- Born: 14 May 1979 (age 47); The Hague, Netherlands
- Batting: Right-handed
- Bowling: Right arm off spin
- Role: Batsman

International information
- National side: Netherlands
- ODI debut (cap 33): 6 August 2006 v Scotland
- Last ODI: 31 March 2012 v Afghanistan
- ODI shirt no.: 99
- T20I debut (cap 2): 2 August 2008 v Kenya
- Last T20I: 23 March 2012 v Ireland
- T20I shirt no.: 99

Career statistics
| Competition | ODI | T20I | FC | LA |
|---|---|---|---|---|
| Matches | 33 | 11 | 19 | 64 |
| Runs scored | 472 | 114 | 887 | 924 |
| Batting average | 17.48 | 28.50 | 26.87 | 17.76 |
| 100s/50s | 0/1 | 0/0 | 1/5 | 0/3 |
| Top score | 97 | 49 | 196 | 97 |
| Balls bowled | 6 | – | 45 | 42 |
| Wickets | 1 | – | 1 | 3 |
| Bowling average | 2.00 | – | 36.00 | 11.33 |
| 5 wickets in innings | 0 | – | 0 | 0 |
| 10 wickets in match | 0 | – | 0 | 0 |
| Best bowling | 1/2 | – | 1/2 | 2/32 |
| Catches/stumpings | 6/– | 4/– | 6/– | 10/– |
- Source: Cricket Archive, 7 May 2012

Tom Nico de Grooth (born 14 May 1979) is a Dutch cricketer. He is a right-handed batsman and a right-arm off spin bowler. He made his debut for the Dutch national team in a one-day game against Denmark on 26 July 2003. His highest first-class score is 196 for the Netherlands, which came against Bermuda in the 2007-08 ICC Intercontinental Cup. In 2010, De Grooth was among the first three cricketers to be awarded central contracts with the Koninklijke Nederlandse Cricket Bond (Royal Dutch Cricket Board).

== Cricket Career ==
The 2008 ICC World Twenty20 Qualifier was hosted by Ireland, the pre-tournament favourites. Of the six teams participating, the tournament marker the first time four of them played Twenty20 Internationals (T20I) including the Netherlands. The opening match between the Netherlands and Kenya nine of the Netherlands' players, including De Grooth, were playing not just their first T20I, but their first twenty20 match.

In the opening match of the T20 World Cup 2009 against England , De Grooth was man of the match as he smashed 49 off 30 balls which included 6 fours and 1 six, and he was instrumental in a shock victory for the Dutch.

The Koninklijke Nederlandse Cricket Bond (Royal Dutch Cricket Board) awarded central contract to three players in January 2010. The board had never before given its players contracts and was a step towards making the team professional, so that players could spend more time honing their skills without having to balance another job. Along with captain Peter Borren and batsman Eric Szwarczynski, De Grooth was one of the three players. The England Cricket Board launched a new one-day competition, the Clydesdale Bank 40, in 2010. As well as the 18 first-class teams from England and Wales, two overseas teams were invited to participate. The Netherlands and Scotland made up the final two teams. The Netherlands lost all but two of their twelve matches; they won one and the other was ended in no result. From the five matches he played in De Grooth scored 34 runs from three innings.

De Grooth was included in the Netherlands' 15-man squad for the 2011 World Cup. Losing all six of their matches, the Netherlands exited in the first round. De Grooth managed 50 runs from five appearances, with a highest score of 28 against England. Later that year the Netherlands took part in the 2011 Clydesdale Bank 40. They improved on the results of the previous year, winning five and tying one of their twelve matches. De Grooth contributed 238 runs at an average of 26.44 with a single half-century.

Ten teams participated in the 2011–12 Caribbean Twenty20: seven from the Caribbean and three foreign teams chosen by invitation. The three foreign teams were Canada (who had played in the previous two editions of the tournament), while the Netherlands and Sussex County Cricket Club replaced the two teams that had taken part the previous year. De Grooth was included in the 14-man squad and scored 15 runs from two matches. It was believed that the Caribbean Twenty20, held in January 2012, would provide good preparation for the Netherlands' participation in the 2012 ICC World Twenty20 Qualifier in March. The UAE hosted the qualifying tournament, and though the Netherlands made it to the preliminary finals they lost to Ireland and did not qualify for the World Twenty20 later that year. De Grooth played in 9 matches and scored 19 runs from 5 innings, and was dismissed just once.

== Pursued Career ==
In January 2017, de Grooth was named as assistant coach of Voorburg Cricket Club in the Netherlands. He was also named head coach of Under-17 team.

He pursued his career as head groundsman in which he lead the professionalisation of the grass wicket ground of Voorburg Cricket Club.

He welcomed several international cricket matches on the Voorburg Cricket Club ground, such as the first ETPL tournament.

He was also guest on the podcast series named: 'Over Cricket Gesproken...'.
