= Edgar Schiferli =

Dutch cricketer (born 1976)

Personal information
- Full name: Edgar Schiferli
- Born: 17 May 1976 (age 50); The Hague, Netherlands
- Batting: Right-handed
- Bowling: Right arm medium-fast
- Role: Bowler

International information
- National side: Netherlands (2002–2013)
- ODI debut (cap 17): 16 September 2002 v Sri Lanka
- Last ODI: 27 August 2013 v Canada
- ODI shirt no.: 9
- T20I debut (cap 6): 2 August 2008 v Kenya
- Last T20I: 9 February 2010 v Canada
- T20I shirt no.: 9

Domestic team information
- Years: Team
- Quick Haag

Career statistics
Competition	ODI	T20I	FC	LA
Matches	30	7	12	57
Runs scored	161	7	257	480
Batting average	10.06	3.50	19.76	15.00
100s/50s	0/0	0/0	0/1	0/1
Top score	41	5*	69	89*
Balls bowled	1,294	138	2,142	2,754
Wickets	33	6	41	84
Bowling average	30.54	24.33	27.34	24.63
5 wickets in innings	0	0	2	2
10 wickets in match	0	0	0	0
Best bowling	4/23	3/23	5/48	5/20
Catches/stumpings	3/–	5/–	6/–	12/–
- Source: Cricinfo, 14 May 2017

Edgar Schiferli (born 17 May 1976) is a Dutch former cricketer. He is a right-handed batsman and a right-handed medium-fast bowler.

== International career ==
Schiferli was part of the Netherlands squad who were runners-up at the Denmark European Cup in 1996. Prior to the Cricket World Cup he spent three months in South Africa, honing his cricketing skills, and played during the 2002 Six Nations Challenge in Namibia.

He made his debut in the One Day Internationals and Twenty20 Internationals against Sri Lanka and Kenya in 2002 and 2008, respectively.

In 2009 he won the award for best player in the 2009 ICC World Cup Qualifying competition.

== Sources ==
- Edgar Schiferli at Cricinfo
