= Mark Jonkman =

Dutch cricketer (born 1986)

Personal information
- Batting: Right-handed
- Bowling: Right-arm fast
- Relatives: Maurits Jonkman (twin brother)

International information
- National side: Netherlands
- ODI debut (cap 34): 26 November 2006 v Canada
- Last ODI: 20 July 2010 v Bangladesh
- T20I debut (cap 18): 11 February 2010 v Kenya
- Last T20I: 13 February 2010 v Ireland

Career statistics
Competition	ODI	T20I	FC	LA
Matches	16	3	6	24
Runs scored	59	1	144	95
Batting average	11.80	1.00	20.57	11.87
100s/50s	0/0	0/0	0/0	0/0
Top score	16	1	43*	16
Balls bowled	719	48	858	1,091
Wickets	24	4	15	37
Bowling average	23.54	11.75	27.93	24.27
5 wickets in innings	0	0	1	0
10 wickets in match	0	0	0	0
Best bowling	3/24	2/21	5/21	3/24
Catches/stumpings	1/–	2/–	3/–	3/–
- Source: ESPNCricinfo, 20 July 2010

Mark Benjamin Sebastiaan Jonkman (born 20 March 1986) is a Dutch former cricketer. He is a right-arm fast bowler who has modelled his action on Australian fast bowler Brett Lee.

His identical twin, Maurits, made his debut for Netherlands in 2007.
