= Atse Buurman =

Dutch One Day International cricketer

Personal information
- Full name: Atse Folkert Buurman
- Born: 21 March 1982 (age 44); Dordrecht
- Batting: Right-handed
- Role: Wicket-keeper-batsman

International information
- National side: Netherlands
- ODI debut (cap 37): 3 July 2007 v Canada
- Last ODI: 20 July 2010 v Bangladesh
- ODI shirt no.: 82

Career statistics
Competition	ODI	T20I	FC	LA
Matches	15	4	5	27
Runs scored	114	0	176	236
Batting average	16.28	0	19.55	14.75
100s/50s	0/0	0/0	0/0	0/1
Top score	34	0	41	53
Catches/stumpings	14/3	1/1	16/1	22/5
- Source: CricketArchive, 31 July 2010

Atse Buurman (born 21 March 1982) is a Dutch former cricketer. He was a wicketkeeper-batsman but made his debut for the Netherlands in 2007 as a specialist batsman. After the retirement of Jeroen Smits, he concentrated on his wicket-keeping. Buurman once made 53 against an India A side. He played club cricket for VOC Rotterdam.
