= Mudassar Bukhari =

Dutch international cricketer (born 1983)

Personal information
- Full name: Mudassar Bukhari
- Born: 26 December 1983 (age 42); Gujrat, Punjab, Pakistan
- Batting: Right-handed
- Bowling: Right-arm fast-medium
- Role: Bowling all-rounder

International information
- National side: Netherlands (2007–2016)
- ODI debut (cap 36): 3 July 2007 v Canada
- Last ODI: 28 January 2014 v Canada
- ODI shirt no.: 7
- T20I debut (cap 4): 2 August 2008 v Kenya
- Last T20I: 3 February 2016 v UAE
- T20I shirt no.: 7

Career statistics
Competition	ODI	T20I	FC	LA
Matches	46	38	11	115
Runs scored	516	157	397	1,537
Batting average	17.20	8.72	22.05	20.77
100s/50s	0/2	0/0	0/3	0/6
Top score	71	28*	66*	84
Balls bowled	2,036	704	1,843	4,937
Wickets	57	43	34	147
Bowling average	24.08	18.13	26.73	26.82
5 wickets in innings	0	0	2	0
10 wickets in match	0	0	0	0
Best bowling	3/17	4/7	6/43	4/32
Catches/stumpings	6/–	9/–	2/–	16/–
- Source: CricketArchive, 6 February 2016

Mudassar Bukhari (Urdu: مدثر بخاری; born 26 December 1983) is a Pakistani-born Dutch international cricketer who made his debut for the Netherlands national cricket team in July 2007. He represented the Dutch team at both One Day International (ODI) and Twenty20 International level. He played as a bowling all-rounder, who was often used as a pinch hitter and a finisher.

== Career ==
Mudassar made his debut for the Netherlands in a first class fixture against Canada. He batted at eight and made an unbeaten 66 which he followed up with two quick top order Canadian wickets. He also made his ODI debut against the Canada national cricket team on 3 July 2007. In his debut match, Bukhari took 3 wicket for 8 over and made 6 runs with the bat. In 2014 ICC World Twenty20, he took 3 for 12 to defeat England, winning the Man of the Match award.

Bukhari's best bowling performance in Twenty20 Internationals came on 3 February 2016 against UAE. He took 4 wickets from 7 runs and Netherlands won the match by a margin of 84 runs. Bukhari was adjudged man of the match as well.

In September 2016, Bukhari announced his retirement from four-day and 50-over cricket.
