= Bastiaan Zuiderent =

Dutch international cricketer

Personal information
- Full name: Bastiaan Zuiderent
- Born: 3 March 1977 (age 49); Utrecht, Netherlands
- Height: 6 ft 3 in (1.91 m)
- Batting: Right-handed
- Bowling: Right arm medium
- Role: Batsman

International information
- National side: Netherlands (1996–2011)
- ODI debut (cap 11): 17 February 1996 v New Zealand
- Last ODI: 11 March 2011 v India
- ODI shirt no.: 33 (previously 97)
- T20I debut (cap 16): 5 June 2009 v England
- Last T20I: 13 February 2010 v Ireland
- T20I shirt no.: 33

Domestic team information
- Years: Team
- 2001–2003: Sussex

Career statistics
Competition	ODI	T20I	FC	LA
Matches	53	6	30	109
Runs scored	1,080	108	1,301	2,656
Batting average	25.71	21.60	29.56	29.18
100s/50s	0/8	0/0	2/9	4/16
Top score	77*	43*	149*	119
Balls bowled	–	–	–	12
Wickets	–	–	–	0
Bowling average	–	–	–	–
5 wickets in innings	–	–	–	–
10 wickets in match	–	–	–	–
Best bowling	–	–	–	–
Catches/stumpings	26/0	2/–	22/0	47/0
- Source: ESPNcricinfo, 15 May 2017

Bastiaan Zuiderent (born 3 March 1977) is a Dutch former international cricketer. He is a right-handed batsman and a right-arm medium-pace bowler. He is one of the very few Dutch cricketers to have appeared in six International Cricket Council events.

== International career ==
At the age of 18, Zuiderent was selected in the Netherlands squad for their inaugural appearance at the Cricket World Cup in 1996. In his second World Cup match, he scored 54 against England at Peshawar, in Pakistan.

The following year, Zuiderent was selected in the Dutch squad for the 1997 ICC Trophy, where the team was unable to secure qualification for the 1999 Cricket World Cup.

Most notably, he missed the 2001 ICC Trophy competition in which the Netherlands earned qualification for the 2003 Cricket World Cup, but he did later represent his country in all their matches at the 2003 Cricket World Cup.

His county stint with Sussex County Cricket Club, from 1999 to 2003, at times kept him away from the national team.

After leaving Sussex, Zuiderent returned to the Netherlands and once again was a regular member of the national team. In the 2005 ICC Trophy, he scored three centuries and finished as the tournament's top run-scorer. He produced a man of the match performance in the 5th/6th place play-off against the United Arab Emirates, carrying his bat and scoring 116 not out. The win ensured that the Netherlands would qualify for the 2007 Cricket World Cup and receive ICC funding and ODI status for four years. Zuiderent was named as the Player of the Tournament.

In February 2007, Zuiderent was named in the Dutch squad for the 2007 Cricket World Cup.

== County career ==
In 1999, Zuiderent was signed by Sussex County Cricket Club, and played for them up until the end of the 2003 season. During this period, he did not always appear regularly for the Netherlands team as he believed that playing in matches for Sussex would be more beneficial to his career.
