= Eric Szwarczynski =

South African-born Dutch cricketer (born 1983)

Personal information
- Full name: Eric Stefan Szwarczynski
- Born: 13 February 1983 (age 43); Vanderbijlpark, Gauteng, South Africa
- Batting: Right-handed
- Bowling: Right-arm medium
- Role: Batsman

International information
- National side: Netherlands
- ODI debut (cap 32): 6 July 2006 v Sri Lanka
- Last ODI: 28 January 2014 v Canada
- ODI shirt no.: 13
- T20I debut (cap 10): 2 August 2008 v Kenya
- Last T20I: 28 November 2013 v Scotland
- T20I shirt no.: 13

Career statistics
Competition	ODI	T20I	FC	LA
Matches	41	14	18	85
Runs scored	1,102	233	664	1,917
Batting average	29.78	21.18	22.89	24.89
100s/50s	0/10	0/0	0/5	2/14
Top score	98	45	93	129*
Balls bowled	–	–	136	36
Wickets	–	–	3	0
Bowling average	–	–	32.66	–
5 wickets in innings	–	–	0	–
10 wickets in match	–	–	0	–
Best bowling	–	–	2/24	–
Catches/stumpings	7/–	5/–	8/–	21/–
- Source: ESPNcricinfo, 28 January 2014

Eric Szwarczynski (/ʃvɑːrˈtʃɪnski/; born 13 February 1983) is a South African-born Dutch former cricketer. A right-handed batsman, he played 41 One Day Internationals for the Netherlands between 2006 and 2014.

== Personal life ==
Szwarczynski was born Eric Stefan Szwarczynski on 13 February 1983 in Vanderbijlpark, South Africa. He enjoys fishing and golfing in his free time.

== International career ==
Szwarczynski made his debut for the Dutch national team in an ICC Intercontinental Cup game against Scotland on 29 July 2005. He made his One Day International debut against Sri Lanka on 6 July 2006. He also represented the Netherlands A team and under-23 team.
