= Peter Borren =

Dutch cricketer

Personal information
- Full name: Peter William Borren
- Born: 21 August 1983 (age 43); Christchurch, Canterbury, New Zealand
- Nickname: Baldrick
- Batting: Right-handed
- Bowling: Right-arm medium
- Role: Allrounder

International information
- National side: Netherlands (2006–2017)
- ODI debut (cap 25): 4 July 2006 v Sri Lanka
- Last ODI: 28 January 2014 v Canada
- ODI shirt no.: 83 (previously 17)
- T20I debut (cap 1): 2 August 2008 v Kenya
- Last T20I: 18 January 2017 v Hong Kong
- T20I shirt no.: 83

Domestic team information
- Years: Team
- 2011/12: Central Districts

Career statistics
Competition	ODI	T20I	FC	LA
Matches	58	43	27	153
Runs scored	1,004	638	1,331	2,746
Batting average	22.31	19.33	27.16	23.67
100s/50s	0/5	0/1	2/5	2/12
Top score	96	57	109	115
Balls bowled	1,979	526	3,197	4,575
Wickets	46	18	41	106
Bowling average	35.21	33.50	40.29	36.67
5 wickets in innings	0	0	0	0
10 wickets in match	0	0	0	0
Best bowling	4/32	2/19	4/1	4/32
Catches/stumpings	28/0	28/0	40/0	72/0
- Source: Cricinfo, 17 March 2018

Peter William Borren (born 21 August 1983) is a New Zealand-born former cricketer. He was the captain for the Netherlands at the international level, until he retired in April 2018.

== Early career ==
Borren played club cricket for Old Collegians CC in Christchurch and made his way into the Canterbury cricket side. In the 2002 Under-19 World Cup he represented his native New Zealand alongside Ross Taylor and Jesse Ryder. He also played for Weedons Club.

== Domestic career ==
On 24 June 2015, he scored his debut List A century while playing against Papua New Guinea in the 2015–17 ICC World Cricket League Championship.

He also represented Central Districts in the Ford Trophy 50-over competition in his native New Zealand.

== International career ==
In 2002, he left New Zealand and moved to the Netherlands. He made his debut with the Netherlands national cricket team in a One Day International against Sri Lanka on 4 July 2006. He also previously played for the Netherlands A team and Under-23 team. In 2010, he was given a central contract by the Royal Dutch Cricket Association.

His career highlights are the two wins against England at the 2009 and 2014 T20 World Cups respectively. He has won the Netherlands national competition with VRA Amsterdam 5 times in 12 years.

In November 2020, Borren was nominated for the ICC Men's Associate Cricketer of the Decade award.
