= Ryan ten Doeschate =

Dutch-South African cricket coach

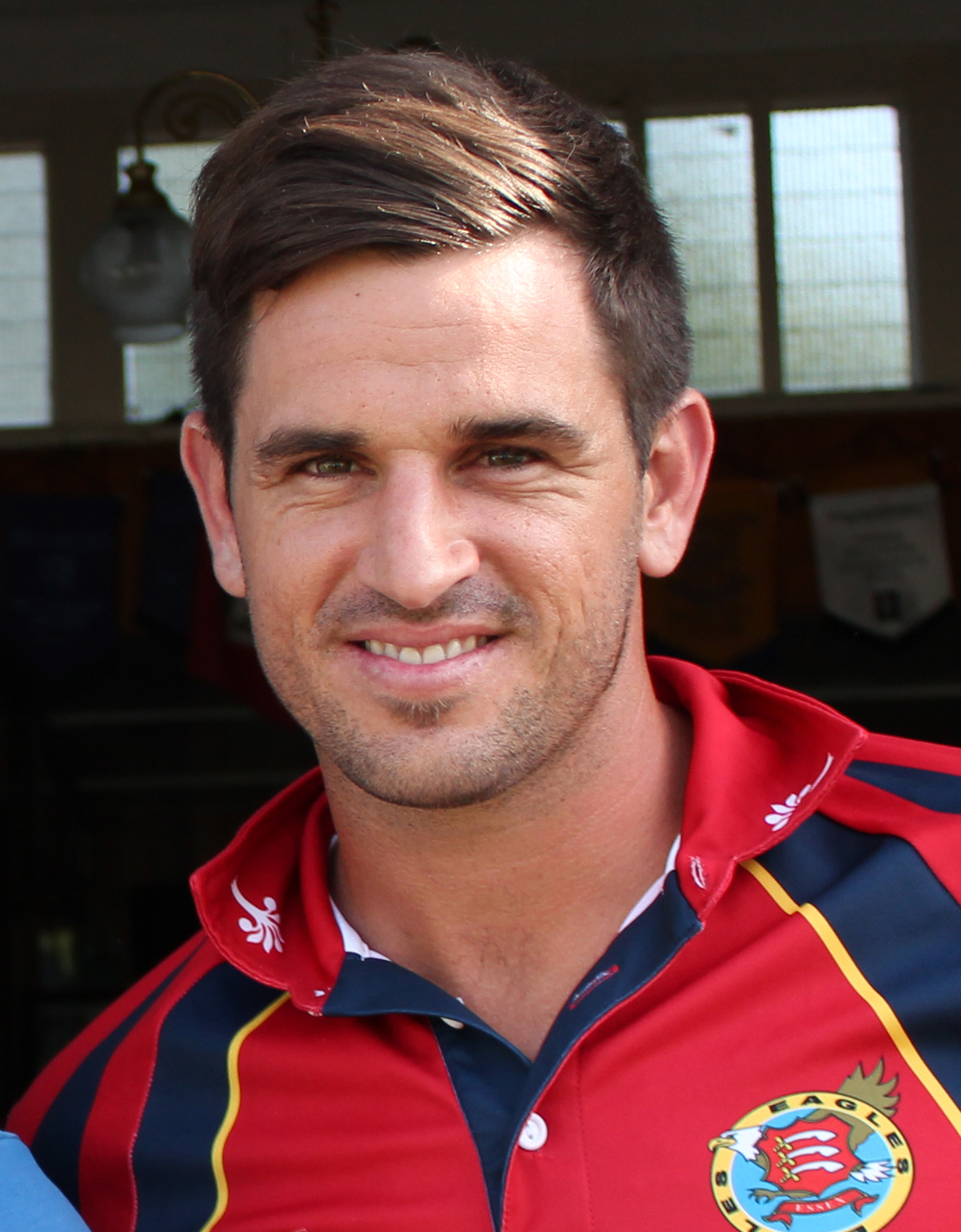
- ten Doeschate in 2013

Personal information
- Full name: Ryan Neil ten Doeschate
- Born: 30 June 1980 (age 46); Port Elizabeth, Cape Province, South Africa
- Nickname: Tendo
- Height: 5 ft 11 in (1.80 m)
- Batting: Right-handed
- Bowling: Right-arm medium-fast
- Role: All-rounder

International information
- National side: Netherlands (2006–2021)
- ODI debut (cap 30): 4 July 2006 v Sri Lanka
- Last ODI: 18 March 2011 v Ireland
- ODI shirt no.: 27 (previously 22)
- T20I debut (cap 10): 2 August 2008 v Kenya
- Last T20I: 20 October 2021 v Namibia
- T20I shirt no.: 27

Domestic team information
- Years: Team
- 2003–2021 (Note: Only major teams that ten Doeschate played for are listed here.): Essex
- 2010/11–2011/12: Mashonaland Eagles
- 2010/11: Canterbury
- 2010/11: Tasmania
- 2011–2015: Kolkata Knight Riders
- 2012/13–2014/15: Otago
- 2013: Chittagong Kings
- 2014/15: Adelaide Strikers
- 2015: Dhaka Dynamites
- 2016: Karachi Kings
- 2016: Comilla Victorians
- 2019: Rajshahi Kings
- 2019: Lahore Qalandars
- 2019/20: Nelson Mandela Bay Giants

Career statistics
Competition	ODI	T20I	FC	LA
Matches	33	24	203	235
Runs scored	1,541	533	11,298	6,166
Batting average	67.00	41.00	44.30	43.42
100s/50s	5/9	0/3	29/53	11/31
Top score	119	59	259*	180
Balls bowled	1,580	210	11,042	5,825
Wickets	55	13	214	189
Bowling average	24.12	18.84	33.84	29.37
5 wickets in innings	0	0	7	1
10 wickets in match	0	0	0	0
Best bowling	4/31	3/23	6/20	5/50
Catches/stumpings	13/–	4/–	127/–	72/–
- Source: ESPNcricinfo, 21 September 2022

Ryan Neil ten Doeschate (Dutch pronunciation: [tɛn ˈdusxaːtə]; born 30 June 1980) is a Dutch cricket coach and former cricketer. He was recently one of the assistant coaches of the Indian men's cricket team. Born in South Africa, he played for the Netherlands national cricket team in One Day International (ODI) and Twenty20 International (T20I) cricket. Ten Doeschate was named ICC Associate Player of the Year on a record three occasions, in 2008, 2010, and 2011.

Born and raised in South Africa, ten Doeschate signed with Essex County Cricket Club in England for the 2003 English season, qualifying through his Dutch citizenship as a domestic player. A right-handed all-rounder, he first represented the Dutch national team in the 2005 ICC Trophy, and played a number of tournaments for the team, including the 2009 World Twenty20 and 2011 World Cup. At the latter tournament, ten Doeschate scored 119 runs against England, the first ODI century by a Dutch player against a full member of the ICC.

At domestic level, ten Doeschate first established himself as a regular for Essex during the 2006 season, and was named the team's limited-overs captain for the 2014 season. He played for a number of professional Twenty20 teams in other countries, including franchises in Australia's Big Bash, the Bangladesh Premier League, the Indian Premier League and in New Zealand, South Africa and Zimbabwe.

In September 2021, ten Doeschate announced that he would retire from professional cricket at the end of 2021. He played his final international against Namibia on 20 October 2021 during the group match in 2021 ICC Men's T20 World Cup. In December 2021 he was appointed as Kent County Cricket Club's batting coach. In November 2022, he was appointed as the fielding coach of Kolkata Knight Riders in the Indian Premier League. In July 2024, he was appointed as one of the assistant coaches of the India men's cricket team. In 2026, he was appointed as the head of cricket ctrategy of Knight Riders Group including Kolkata Knight Riders, Los Angeles Knight Riders and Abu Dhabi Knight Riders following his departure from India national cricket team as an assistant coach after completing two years of contract.

== Early life and education ==
Ten Doeschate was born on 30 June 1980 in Port Elizabeth, South Africa. He is the son of Ingrid and Boudewyn ten Doeschate; his father was originally from the Dutch city of Zwolle. He attended high school at Fairbairn College and went on to attend the University of Cape Town, where he captained the cricket team.

== Domestic and franchise career ==
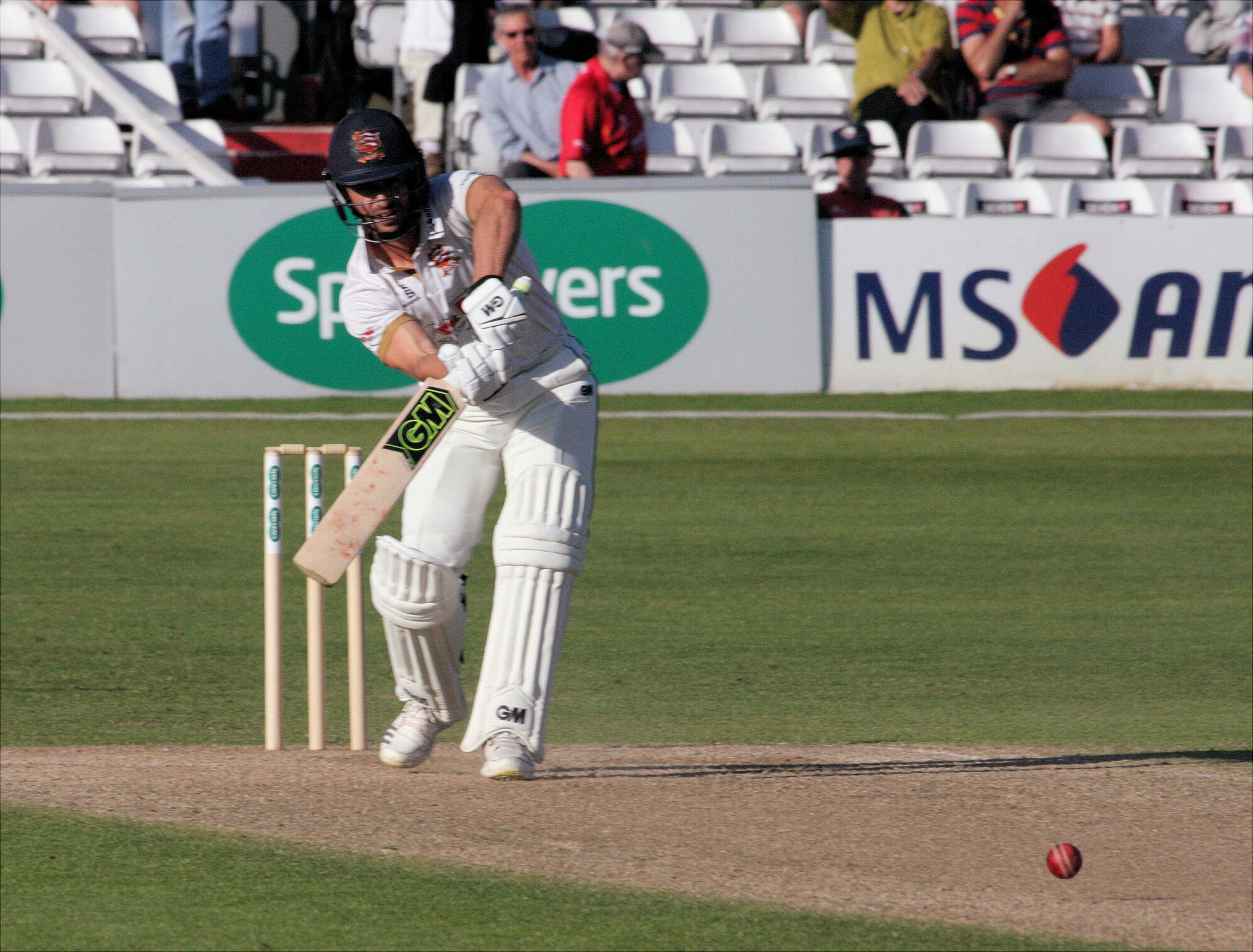
ten Doeschate batting for Essex in 2018.

In 2003, Graham Gooch was on tour with Essex in South Africa and saw ten Doeschate play in a match against a Western Province second XI. Against Essex, he first excelled with the ball in a four-day game before impressing with the bat in a one-day match. Gooch's friend Peter Kirsten, one of the Western Province coaches, mentioned ten Doeschate's EU citizenship that would make him eligible to play in England.

In 2008, ten Doeschate became one of the cornerstones of a strong Essex team and enjoyed success with them, winning the Friends Provident Trophy and Pro40 Division 2. During a Clydesdale Bank 40 match against the Derbyshire Falcons, ten Doeschate scored 109 not out in 2010. He led the batting averages for Essex in the Friends Provident t20, scoring 296 runs in six matches at an average of 59.20.

In 2010, he signed with Tasmania for the Twenty20 Big Bash League. In January 2011, ten Doeschate was signed by Kolkata Knight Riders in the Indian Premier League 2011 Auction, becoming the first Associate player to win an IPL contract.

In 2016 he was appointed captain of Essex in the County Championship. In his first season as captain, he led the team to promotion to the first division. The following season Essex won the Championship. In January 2020, he stepped down as the captain of Essex after leading the club for four straight seasons.

In 2015, he was signed by Dhaka Dynamites for the 2015–16 Bangladesh Premier League.

== International career ==
In successive innings in international matches for the Netherlands in the ICC Intercontinental Cup competition in 2005 and 2006, he scored 84, 158, 138, 100 and finally 259 not out, the last innings setting a new record for the competition.

Ten Doeschate was selected in the Netherlands squad for the 2007 Cricket World Cup. In a warm-up match he took five wickets against a strong India team. He followed this up by scoring 57 runs off 74 balls. In the opening match of the 2009 ICC World Twenty20, he contributed to the shock defeat of the host nation England, taking two wickets and scoring 22 not out.

In October 2010, ten Doeschate was named the Associate and Affiliate Player of the Year at the ICC Awards in Bangalore. He had previously won this award in 2008. He won the award again in 2011.

On 14 November 2017, ten Doeschate was recalled to the Dutch team after an almost six-year absence in order to help the Dutch qualify for the 2019 Cricket World Cup. In February 2018, the International Cricket Council (ICC) named ten Doeschate as one of the ten players to watch ahead of the 2018 Cricket World Cup Qualifier tournament. In September 2019, he was named in the Dutch squad for the 2019 ICC T20 World Cup Qualifier tournament in the United Arab Emirates. Ahead of the tournament, the International Cricket Council (ICC) named him as the key player in the Dutch squad. In September 2021, he was named in the Dutch squad for the 2021 ICC Men's T20 World Cup.
