= List of New Zealand Twenty20 International cricket records =

A Twenty20 International (T20I) is a form of cricket, played between two of the international members of the International Cricket Council (ICC), in which each team faces a maximum of twenty overs. The matches have top-class status and are the highest T20 standard. The game is played under the rules of Twenty20 cricket. The first Twenty20 International match between two men's sides was played on 17 February 2005, involving New Zealand and New Zealand. Wisden Cricketers' Almanack reported that "neither side took the game especially seriously", and it was noted by Cricinfo that but for a large score for Ricky Ponting, "the concept would have shuddered". However, Ponting himself said "if it does become an international game then I'm sure the novelty won't be there all the time". This is a list of New Zealand Cricket team's Twenty20 International records. It is based on the List of Twenty20 International records, but concentrates solely on records dealing with the New Zealand cricket team. New Zealand played the first ever T20I in 2005.

== Key ==
The top five records are listed for each category, except for the team wins, losses, draws and ties, all round records and the partnership records. Tied records for fifth place are also included. Explanations of the general symbols and cricketing terms used in the list are given below. Specific details are provided in each category where appropriate. All records include matches played for New Zealand only, and are correct as of August 2020.

Key
Symbol	Meaning
†	Player or umpire is currently active in T20I cricket
‡	Even took place during a T20 World Cup
*	Player remained not out or partnership remained unbroken
♠	Twenty20 International cricket record
Date	Starting date of the match
Innings	Number of innings played
Matches	Number of matches played
Opposition	The team New Zealand was playing against
Period	The time period when the player was active in ODI cricket
Player	The player involved in the record
Venue	Twenty20 International cricket ground where the match was played

== Team records ==
=== Overall record ===
Matches	Won	Lost	Tied	NR	Win %
249	126	102	10	11	53.99
Last Updated: 26 January 2026

=== Team wins, losses, draws and ties ===
As of January 2026, New Zealand has played 249 T20I matches resulting in 126 victories, 102 defeats, 10 ties, and 11 no results for an overall winning percentage of 53.99.

Opponent	Matches	Won	Lost	Tied	No Result	% Won
Full Members
Afghanistan	2	1	1	0	0	50.00
Australia	22	5	15	1	0	28.57
Bangladesh	20	15	4	0	1	78.94
England	30	10	16	1	1	37.03
India	28	10	15	3	0	37.50
Ireland	5	5	0	0	0	100.00
Pakistan	49	23	24	0	2	48.93
South Africa	18	7	11	0	0	38.88
Sri Lanka	28	16	9	2	1	59.25
West Indies	25	13	6	3	2	63.63
Zimbabwe	8	8	0	0	0	100.00
Associate Members
Kenya	1	1	0	0	0	100.00
Namibia	1	1	0	0	0	100.00
Netherlands	3	3	0	0	0	100.00
Papua New Guinea	1	1	0	0	0	100.00
Scotland	4	4	0	0	0	100.00
Uganda	1	1	0	0	0	100.00
United Arab Emirates	3	2	1	0	0	66.66
Total	249	126	102	10	11	53.99
Statistics are correct as of New Zealand v India at Barsapara Cricket Stadium, Guwahati 3rd T20i Match, India vs New Zealand T20I series, 25 January 2026.

=== First bilateral T20I series wins ===
Opponent	Year of first Home win	Year of first Away win
Australia	2021	-
Bangladesh	2010	2014
England	-	2013
India	2009	2012
Ireland	YTP	2022
Netherlands	-	2022
Pakistan	2011	-
Scotland	YTP	2022
South Africa	-	2005
Sri Lanka	2016	2009
United Arab Emirates	YTP	2023
West Indies	2006	2022
Zimbabwe	2012	2011
Last Updated: 15 August 2022

=== First T20I match wins ===
Opponent	Home		Away / Neutral	
Opponent	Venue	Year	Venue	Year
Afghanistan	YTP	YTP	Sheikh Zayed Cricket Stadium, Abu Dhabi, UAE	2021
Australia	AMI Stadium, Christchurch, New Zealand	2010	Himachal Pradesh Cricket Association Stadium, Dharamshala, India	2016
Bangladesh	Seddon Park, Hamilton, New Zealand	2010	Pallekele International Cricket Stadium, Kandy, Sri Lanka	2012
England	Seddon Park, Hamilton, New Zealand	2013	Sahara Stadium, Kingsmead, Durban, South Africa	2007
India	Lancaster Park, Christchurch, New Zealand	2009	New Wanderers Stadium, Johannesburg, South Africa	2007
Ireland	YTP	YTP	Trent Bridge, Nottingham, England	2009
Kenya	YTP	YTP	Sahara Stadium, Kingsmead, Durban, South Africa	2007
Namibia	YTP	YTP	Sharjah Cricket Stadium, Sharjah, UAE	2021
Netherlands	YTP	YTP	Zohur Ahmed Chowdhury Stadium, Chittagong, Bangladesh	2014
Pakistan	Eden Park, Auckland, New Zealand	2010	Kensington Oval, Bridgetown, Barbados	2010
Papua New Guinea	YTP	YTP	Brian Lara Cricket Academy, San Fernando, Trinidad and Tobago	2024
Scotland	YTP	YTP	The Oval, London, England	2009
South Africa	Westpac Stadium, Wellington, New Zealand	2012	New Wanderers Stadium, Johannesburg, South Africa	2005
Sri Lanka	Eden Park, Auckland, New Zealand	2006	Ranasinghe Premadasa Stadium, Colombo, Sri Lanka	2009
Uganda	YTP	YTP	Brian Lara Cricket Academy, San Fernando, Trinidad and Tobago	2024
West Indies	Seddon Park, Hamilton, New Zealand	2008	Windsor Park, Roseau, Dominica	2014
Zimbabwe	Eden Park, Auckland, New Zealand	2012	Providence Stadium, Providence, Guyana	2010
Last Updated: 10 November 2021

=== Team scoring records ===
==== Most runs in an innings ====
The highest innings total scored in T20Is has been scored twice. The first occasion came in the match between Afghanistan and Ireland when Afghanistan scored 278/3 in the 2nd T20I of the Ireland series in India in February 2019. The Czech Republic national cricket team against Turkey during the 2019 Continental Cup scored 278/4 to equal the record. The highest score for New Zealand is 254/5 scored against Scotland during the New Zealand tour of Scotland in 2022.

Rank	Score	Opposition	Venue	Date
1	259/7	India	Eden Park, Auckland, New Zealand	30 October 2026
2	254/5	Scotland	The Grange Club, Edinburgh, Scotland	29 July 2022
3	243/5	West Indies	Bay Oval, Tauranga, New Zealand	3 January 2018
4	243/6	Australia	Eden Park, Auckland, New Zealand	16 February 2018
5	238/3	West Indies	Bay Oval, Tauranga, New Zealand	29 November 2020
Last Updated: 30 October 2026

==== Fewest runs in an innings ====
The lowest innings total scored was by Turkey against Czech Republic when they were dismissed for 21 during the 2019 Continental Cup. The lowest score in T20I history for New Zealand is 60 scored twice against Sri Lanka and Bangladesh in Chittagong and Dhaka, respectively.

Rank	Score	Opposition	Venue	Date
1	60/10	Bangladesh	Sher-e-Bangla National Cricket Stadium, Dhaka, Bangladesh	1 September 2021
1	60/10	Sri Lanka	Zahur Ahmed Chowdhury Stadium, Chittagong, Bangladesh	31 March 2014 ‡
3	66/10	India	Narendra Modi Stadium, Ahmedabad, India	1 February 2023
4	75/10	Afghanistan	Providence Stadium, Providence, Guyana	8 June 2024
5	80/10	Pakistan	Lancaster Park, Christchurch, New Zealand	30 December 2010
Last Updated: 1 September 2021

==== Most runs conceded an innings ====
The fifth match of the 2017-18 Trans-Tasman Tri-Series against Australia saw New Zealand concede their highest innings total of 245/5.

Rank	Score	Opposition	Venue	Date
1	271/5	India	Greenfield International Stadium, Thiruvananthapuram, India	31 January 2026
2	245/5	Australia	Eden Park, Auckland, New Zealand	16 February 2018
3	241/3	England	McLean Park, Napier, New Zealand	8 November 2019
4	238/7	India	Vidarbha Cricket Association Stadium, Nagpur, India	21 January 2026
5	236/4	England	Hagley Oval,Christchurch, New Zealand	20 October 2025
Last Updated: 21 January

==== Fewest runs conceded in an innings ====
The lowest score conceded by New Zealand for a full inning is 70 when they dismissed Bangladesh during the 2016 ICC World Twenty20 at Eden Gardens, Kolkata, India.

Rank	Score	Opposition	Venue	Date
1	40/10	Uganda	Brian Lara Cricket Academy, San Fernando, Trinidad and Tobago	14 June 2024 ‡
2	70/10	Bangladesh	Eden Gardens, Kolkata, India	26 March 2016 ‡
3	73/10	Kenya	Sahara Stadium, Kingsmead, Durban, South Africa	12 September 2007 ‡
4	76/10	Bangladesh	Eden Park, Auckland, New Zealand	1 April 2021
4	76/10	Bangladesh	Sher-e-Bangla National Cricket Stadium, Mirpur, Bangladesh	5 September 2021
Last Updated: 16 March 2026

==== Most runs aggregate in a match ====
The highest match aggregate scored in T20Is came in the match between India and West Indies in the first T20I of the August 2016 series at Central Broward Regional Park, Lauderhill when India scored 244/4 in response to West Indies score of 245/6 to lose the match by 1 run. The fifth match of the 2017-18 Trans-Tasman Tri-Series against Australia saw a total of 488 runs being scored, the most involving New Zealand.

Rank	Aggregate	Scores	Venue	Date
1	488/11	New Zealand (243/6) v Australia (245/5)	Eden Park, Auckland, New Zealand	16 February 2018
2	434/15	New Zealand (219/7) v Australia (215/8)	University Oval, Dunedin, New Zealand	25 February 2021
3	431/7	New Zealand (215/3) v Australia (216/4)	Wellington Regional Stadium, Wellington, New Zealand	21 February 2024
4	429/12	New Zealand (211/7) v Sri Lanka (218/5)	Saxton Oval, Nelson, New Zealand	2 January 2025
5	428/10	New Zealand (214/6 ) v Australia (214/4 )	Lancaster Park, Christchurch, New Zealand	28 February 2010
Last Updated: 26 January 2025

==== Fewest runs aggregate in a match ====
The lowest match aggregate in T20Is is 57 when Turkey were dismissed for 28 by Luxembourg in the second T20I of the 2019 Continental Cup in Romania in August 2019. The lowest match aggregate in T20I history for New Zealand is 120 scored during the 2010 ICC World Twenty20 against Zimbabwe at Providence Stadium, Providence, Guyana.

Rank	Aggregate	Scores	Venue	Date
1	81/11	Uganda (40) v New Zealand (41/1)	Brian Lara Cricket Academy, San Fernando, Trinidad and Tobago	14 June 2024 ‡
2	120/11	Zimbabwe (84) v New Zealand (36/1)	Providence Stadium, Providence, Guyana	4 May 2010 ‡
3	122/13	New Zealand (60) v Bangladesh (62/3)	Sher-e-Bangla National Cricket Stadium, Dhaka, Bangladesh	1 September 2021
4	128/11	India (67/5) v New Zealand (61/6)	Greenfield International Stadium, Thiruvananthapuram, India	7 November 2017
5	147/11	Kenya (73) v New Zealand (74/1)	Sahara Stadium, Kingsmead, Durban, South Africa	12 September 2007 ‡
Last Updated: 1 September 2021

=== Result records ===
A T20I match is won when one side has scored more runs than the runs scored by the opposing side during their innings. If both sides have completed both their allocated innings and the side that fielded last has the higher aggregate of runs, it is known as a win by runs. This indicates the number of runs that they had scored more than the opposing side. If the side batting last wins the match, it is known as a win by wickets, indicating the number of wickets that were still to fall.

==== Greatest win margins (by runs) ====
The greatest winning margin by runs in T20Is was Czech Republic's victory over Turkey by 257 runs in the sixth match of the 2019 Continental Cup. The largest victory recorded by New Zealand was during the 2017-18 tour by West Indies by 119 runs at Bay Oval, Tauranga, New Zealand.

Rank	Margin	Opposition	Venue	Date
1	119 Runs	West Indies	Bay Oval, Tauranga, New Zealand	3 January 2018
2	115 Runs	Pakistan	Bay Oval, Mount Maunganui, New Zealand	23 March 2025
2	102 Runs	Scotland	The Grange Club, Edinburgh, Scotland	29 July 2022
3	95 Runs	Pakistan	Westpac Stadium, Wellington, New Zealand	22 January 2016
4	90 Runs	West Indies	Sabina Park, Kingston, Jamaica	12 August 2022
Last Updated: 7 March 2021

==== Greatest win margins (by balls remaining) ====
The greatest winning margin by balls remaining in T20Is was Austria's victory over Turkey by 104 balls remaining in the ninth match of the 2019 Continental Cup. The largest victory recorded by New Zealand is during the 2007 ICC World Twenty20 against Kenya when they won by 9 wickets with 74 balls remaining.

Rank	Balls remaining	Margin	Opposition	Venue	Date
1	88	9 wickets	Uganda	Brian Lara Cricket Academy, San Fernando, Trinidad and Tobago	14 June 2024 ‡
2	74	9 wickets	Kenya	Sahara Stadium, Kingsmead, Durban, South Africa	12 September 2007 ‡
3	70	10 wickets	Bangladesh	Seddon Park, Hamilton, New Zealand	3 February 2010
4	60	9 wickets	Sri Lanka	Eden Park, Auckland, New Zealand	10 January 2016
5	39	10 wickets	Zimbabwe	Harare Sports Club, Harare, Zimbabwe	15 October 2011
Last Updated: 7 March 2021

==== Greatest win margins (by wickets) ====
A total of 22 matches have ended with chasing team winning by 10 wickets with New Zealand winning by such margins a record three times.

Rank	Margin	Opposition	Venue	Date
1	10 wickets	Bangladesh	Seddon Park, Hamilton, New Zealand	3 February 2010
1	10 wickets	Zimbabwe	Harare Sports Club, Harare, Zimbabwe	15 October 2011
1	10 wickets	Pakistan	Seddon Park, Hamilton, New Zealand	17 January 2016
1	10 wickets	United Arab Emirates	MA Chidambaram Stadium, Chennai, India	10 February 2026
4	9 wickets	Kenya	Sahara Stadium, Kingsmead, Durban, South Africa	12 September 2007 ‡
4	9 wickets	Sri Lanka	Eden Park, Auckland, New Zealand	10 January 2016
4	9 wickets	Pakistan	Seddon Park, Hamilton, New Zealand	20 December 2020
4	9 wickets	Pakistan	Hagley Oval, Christchurch, New Zealand	11 October 2022
4	9 wickets	Sri Lanka	University Oval, Dunedin, New Zealand	5 April 2023
4	9 wickets	Uganda	Brian Lara Cricket Academy, San Fernando, Trinidad and Tobago	14 June 2024 ‡
Last updated: 20 December 2020

==== Highest successful run chases ====
Australia holds the record for the highest successful run chase which they achieved when they scored 245/5 in response to New Zealand's 243/6.

Rank	Score	Target	Opposition	Venue	Date
1	202/5	201	Zimbabwe	Seddon Park, Hamilton, New Zealand	14 February 2012
2	194/4	194	Pakistan	Rawalpindi Cricket Stadium, Rawalpindi, Pakistan	24 April 2023
3	183/6	183	Sri Lanka	John Davies Oval, Queenstown, New Zealand	8 April 2023
3	183/5	183	Afghanistan	MA Chidambaram Stadium, Chennai, India	8 February 2026 ‡
5	180/4	180	Ireland	Civil Service Cricket Club, Belfast, Northern Ireland	22 July 2022
Last Updated: 16 March 2026

==== Narrowest win margins (by runs) ====
The narrowest run margin victory is by 1 run which has been achieved in 15 T20I's with New Zealand winning such games twice.

Rank	Margin	Opposition	Venue	Date
1	1 Run	Pakistan	Kensington Oval, Bridgetown, Barbados	8 May 2010 ‡
1	1 Run	India	M. A. Chidambaram Stadium, Chennai, India	11 September 2012
3	3 Runs	Sri Lanka	Ranasinghe Premadasa Stadium, Colombo, Sri Lanka	2 September 2009
3	3 Runs	Sri Lanka	Bay Oval, Tauranga, New Zealand	7 January 2016
3	3 Runs	South Africa	Harare Sports Club, Harare, Zimbabwe	26 July 2025
Last Updated: 25 February 2021

==== Narrowest win margins (by balls remaining) ====
The narrowest winning margin by balls remaining in T20Is is by winning of the last ball which has been achieved 26 times. New Zealand has achieve victory of the last ball on two occasions.

Rank	Balls remaining	Margin	Opposition	Venue	Date
1	0	5 wickets	India	Westpac Stadium, Wellington, New Zealand	27 February 2009
1	0	8 wickets	South Africa	Buffalo Park, East London, South Africa	23 December 2012
3	1	2 wickets	Sri Lanka	Providence Stadium, Providence, Guyana	30 April 2010 ‡
3	1	4 wickets	Sri Lanka	John Davies Oval, Queenstown, New Zealand	8 April 2023
4	2	5 wickets	Zimbabwe	Seddon Park, Hamilton, New Zealand	14 February 2012
4	2	4 wickets	Sri Lanka	Pallekele International Cricket Stadium, Kandy, Sri Lanka	3 September 2019
Last Updated: 9 August 2020

==== Narrowest win margins (by wickets) ====
The narrowest margin of victory by wickets is 1 wicket which has settled four such T20Is. The narrowest victory by wickets for New Zealand is two wickets.

Rank	Margin	Opposition	Venue	Date
1	2 wickets	Sri Lanka	Providence Stadium, Providence, Guyana	30 April 2010 ‡
2	4 wickets	West Indies	Westpac Stadium, Wellington, New Zealand	15 January 2014
2	4 wickets	Sri Lanka	Pallekele International Cricket Stadium, Kandy, Sri Lanka	3 September 2019
2	4 wickets	Sri Lanka	John Davies Oval, Queenstown, New Zealand	8 April 2023
4	5 wickets	South Africa	New Wanderers Stadium, Johannesburg, South Africa	21 October 2005
4	5 wickets	Sri Lanka	Eden Park, Auckland, New Zealand	26 December 2006 ‡
4	5 wickets	Sri Lanka	Eden Park, Auckland, New Zealand	26 December 2006
4	5 wickets	India	Westpac Stadium, Wellington, New Zealand	27 February 2009
4	5 wickets	Pakistan	Eden Park, Auckland, New Zealand	26 December 2010
4	5 wickets	Zimbabwe	Seddon Park, Hamilton, New Zealand	14 February 2012 ‡
4	5 wickets	Sri Lanka	Pallekele International Cricket Stadium, Kandy, Sri Lanka	1 September 2019
4	5 wickets	West Indies	Eden Park, Auckland, New Zealand	27 November 2020
4	5 wickets	Pakistan	Eden Park, Auckland, New Zealand	18 December 2020
Last Updated: 18 December 2020

==== Greatest loss margins (by runs) ====
New Zealand's biggest defeat by runs was against India in the 2023 T20I series at Narendra Modi Stadium, Ahmedabad, Indiad.

Rank	Margin	Opposition	Venue	Date
1	168 runs	India	Narendra Modi Stadium, Ahmedabad, India	1 February 2023
2	103 runs	Pakistan	Hagley Oval, Christchurch, New Zealand	30 December 2010
3	96 runs	India	Narendra Modi Stadium, Ahmedabad, India	8 March 2026 ‡
4	95 runs	England	Old Trafford, Manchester, England	1 September 2023
5	88 runs	Pakistan	Gaddafi Stadium, Lahore, Pakistan	14 April 2023
Last Updated: 16 March 2026

==== Greatest loss margins (by balls remaining) ====
The largest defeat suffered by New Zealand was against South Africa in Sahara Stadium, Kingsmead, Durban, South Africa during the 2012-13 tour of South Africa when they lost by 8 wickets with 47 balls remaining.

Rank	Balls remaining	Margin	Opposition	Venue	Date
1	47	8 wickets	South Africa	Sahara Stadium, Kingsmead, Durban, South Africa	21 December 2012
2	44	10 wickets	England	Westpac Stadium, Wellington, New Zealand	15 February 2013
3	41	6 wickets	Pakistan	The Oval, London, England	13 June 2009 ‡
4	30	7 wickets	Bangladesh	Sher-e-Bangla National Cricket Stadium, Dhaka, Bangladesh	1 September 2021
5	27	7 wickets	Sri Lanka	Central Broward Regional Park, Lauderhill, USA	23 May 2010 ‡
Last Updated: 1 September 2021

==== Greatest loss margins (by wickets) ====
New Zealand have lost a T20I match by a margin of 10 wickets on one occasion.

Rank	Margins	Opposition	Most recent venue	Date
1	10 wickets	England	Westpac Stadium, Wellington, New Zealand	15 February 2013
2	9 wickets	England	Old Trafford Cricket Ground, Manchester, England	13 June 2008
3	8 wickets	South Africa	Seddon Park, Hamilton, New Zealand	19 February 2012
3	8 wickets	South Africa	Sahara Stadium, Kingsmead, Durban, South Africa	21 December 2012
3	8 wickets	Sri Lanka	Pallekele International Cricket Stadium, Kandy, Sri Lanka	21 November 2013
Last Updated: 9 August 2020

==== Narrowest loss margins (by runs) ====
The narrowest loss of New Zealand in terms of runs is by 2 runs suffered twice.

Rank	Margin	Opposition	Venue	Date
1	1 runs	Australia	Sydney Cricket Ground, Sydney, Australia	15 February 2009
1	1 runs	South Africa	Lord's, London, England	9 June 2009 ‡
3	2 runs	South Africa	Zohur Ahmed Chowdhury Stadium, Chittagong, Bangladesh	24 March 2014 ‡
3	2 runs	England	Seddon Park, Hamilton, New Zealand	18 February 2018
3	2 runs	Pakistan	Sheikh Zayed Cricket Stadium, Abu Dhabi, UAE	31 October 2018
Last Updated: 9 August 2020

==== Narrowest loss margins (by balls remaining) ====
The narrowest defeat suffered by balls remaining for New Zealand is by 1 ball against South Africa during the 2007 tour of South Africa at New Wanderers Stadium, Johannesburg, South Africa.

Rank	Balls remaining	Margin	Opposition	Venue	Date
1	1	3 wickets	South Africa	New Wanderers Stadium, Johannesburg, South Africa	23 November 2007
2	2	6 wickets	Pakistan	Dubai International Cricket Stadium, Dubai, UAE	2 November 2018
2	2	4 wickets	Pakistan	McLean Park, Napier, New Zealand	22 December 2020
4	5	7 wickets	Pakistan	Dubai International Cricket Stadium, Dubai, UAE	4 December 2014
4	5	6 wickets	South Africa	Sahara Stadium, Kingsmead, Durban, South Africa	19 September 2007 ‡
4	5	3 wickets	England	Darren Sammy National Cricket Stadium, Gros Islet, Saint Lucia	10 May 2010 ‡
4	5	6 wickets	Bangladesh	Sher-e-Bangla National Cricket Stadium, Mirpur, Bangladesh	8 September 2021
Last Updated: 22 December 2020

==== Narrowest loss margins (by wickets) ====
New Zealand has suffered defeat by 3 wicket twice.

Rank	Margin	Opposition	Venue	Date
1	3 wickets	South Africa	New Wanderers Stadium, Johannesburg, South Africa	23 November 2007
1	3 wickets	England	Darren Sammy National Cricket Stadium, Gros Islet, Saint Lucia	10 May 2010 ‡
		Australia	Sharjah Cricket Stadium, Sharjah, United Arab Emirates	26 October 2021
3	4 wickets	Pakistan	McLean Park, Napier, New Zealand	22 December 2020
		India	Sawai Mansingh Stadium, Jaipur, India	17 November 2021
4	5 wickets	Australia	Eden Park, Auckland, New Zealand	16 February 2018
		Pakistan	Hagley Oval, Christchurch, New Zealand	14 October 2022
Last Updated: 22 December 2020

==== Tied matches ====
A tie can occur when the scores of both teams are equal at the conclusion of play, provided that the side batting last has completed their innings. There have been 34 ties in T20Is history with New Zealand having been involved in ten such games, more than any other team.

Opposition	Venue	Date
West Indies	Eden Park, Auckland, New Zealand	16 February 2006
West Indies	Eden Park, Auckland, New Zealand	26 December 2008
Australia	Lancaster Park, Christchurch, New Zealand	28 February 2010
Sri Lanka	Pallekele International Cricket Stadium, Kandy, Sri Lanka	27 September 2012 ‡
West Indies	Pallekele International Cricket Stadium, Kandy, Sri Lanka	1 October 2012
England	Eden Park, Auckland, New Zealand	10 November 2019
India	Seddon Park, Hamilton, New Zealand	29 January 2020
India	Seddon Park, Hamilton, New Zealand	31 January 2020
India	McLean Park, Napier, New Zealand	22 November 2022
Sri Lanka	Eden Park, Auckland, New Zealand	2 April 2023
Last updated: 3 December 2017

== Batting records ==
=== Most career runs ===
A run is the basic means of scoring in cricket. A run is scored when the batsman hits the ball with his bat and with his partner runs the length of 22 yards (20 m) of the pitch. Pakistan's Babar Azam has scored the most runs in T20Is with 4,429. Second is Martin Guptill from New Zealand 3,531.

Rank	Runs	Player	Matches	Innings	Average	100	50	Period
1	3,531	Martin Guptill	122	118	31.81	2	20	2009–2022
2	2,575	Kane Williamson	93	90	33.44	0	18	2011–2024
3	2,281	Glenn Phillips†	95	84	32.12	2	12	2017–2026
4	2,169	Tim Seifert†	88	82	30.54	0	15	2018–2026
5	2,140	Brendon McCullum	71	70	35.66	2	13	2005–2015
6	1,909	Ross Taylor	102	94	26.15	0	7	2006–2020
7	1,862	Daryl Mitchell†	102	89	26.98	0	8	2019–2026
8	1,739	Devon Conway†	66	60	35.48	0	12	2020–2026
9	1,724	Colin Munro	65	62	31.34	3	11	2012–2020
10	1,679	Mark Chapman†	92	76	27.08	1	9	2018–2026
Last Updated: 28 February 2026

=== Fastest to multiples of 1000 runs ===
Runs	Batsman	Innings	Record Date	Reference
1,000	Devon Conway	26	22 October 2022	
2,000	Brendon McCullum	66	29 March 2014	
3,000	Martin Guptill	101	3 November 2021	

=== Most runs in each batting position ===
Batting position	Batsman	Innings	Runs	Average	Career Span	Ref
Opener	Martin Guptill	102	3,170	32.68	2011–2022	
Number 3	Kane Williamson	47	1,375	33.53	2015–2024	
Number 4	Glenn Phillips†	55	1,618	34.42	2017–2026	
Number 5	Ross Taylor	33	783	37.28	2007–2020	
Number 6	James Neesham†	41	624	22.28	2012–2025	
Number 7	Mitchell Santner†	60	681	21.28	2015–2026	
Number 8	Mitchell Santner†	20	232	19.33	2016–2025	
Number 9	Tim Southee	21	124	11.27	2008–2024	
Number 10	Tim Southee	15	84	10.50	2008–2024	
Number 11	Jacob Duffy	8	21	7.00	2021–2026	
Last Updated: 16 March 2026

=== Highest individual score ===
The third T20I of the 2018 Zimbabwe Tri-Nation Series saw Aaron Finch score the highest Individual score. Finn Allen with his knock of 137 against Pakistan during the Pakistani cricket team in New Zealand in 2023–24 holds the New Zealand record.

Rank	Runs	Player	Opposition	Venue	Date
1	137	Finn Allen	Pakistan	University Oval, Dunedin, New Zealand	17 January 2024
2	123	Brendon McCullum	Bangladesh	Pallekele International Cricket Stadium, Kandy, Sri Lanka	21 September 2012 ‡
3	116*	Brendon McCullum	Australia	Lancaster Park, Christchurch, New Zealand	28 February 2010
4	109*	Colin Munro	India	Saurashtra Cricket Association Stadium, Rajkot, India	4 November 2017
5	108	Glenn Phillips	West Indies	Bay Oval, Tauranga, New Zealand	29 November 2020
Last Updated: 16 March 2026

=== Highest individual score – progression of record ===
Runs	Player	Opponent	Venue	Date
66	Scott Styris	Australia	Eden Park, Auckland, New Zealand	17 February 2005
66*	Jacob Oram	Australia	WACA Ground, Perth, Australia	11 December 2007
69*	Brendon McCullum	India	Westpac Stadium, Wellington, New Zealand	27 February 2009
116*	Brendon McCullum	Australia	Lancaster Park, Christchurch, New Zealand	28 February 2010
123	Brendon McCullum	Bangladesh	Pallekele International Cricket Stadium, Kandy, Sri Lanka	21 September 2012 ‡
137	Finn Allen	Pakistan	University Oval, Dunedin, New Zealand	17 January 2024
Last Updated: 17 January 2024

=== Highest career average ===
A batsman's batting average is the total number of runs they have scored divided by the number of times they have been dismissed.

Rank	Average	Player	Innings	Not out	Runs	Period
1	35.66	Brendon McCullum	70	10	2,140	2005–2015
2	35.48	Devon Conway†	60	11	1,739	2020–2025
3	33.44	Kane Williamson	90	13	2,575	2011–2024
4	32.02	Glenn Phillips†	83	13	2,242	2012–2020
5	31.81	Martin Guptill	118	7	3,531	2009–2022
Qualification: 20 innings. Last Updated: 25 February 2026

=== Highest average at each batting position ===
Batting position	Batsman	Innings	Runs	Average	Career Span	Ref
Opener	Kane Williamson	27	886	38.52	2012–2018	
Number 3	Brendon McCullum	26	842	35.08	2012–2014	
Number 4	Glenn Phillips†	44	1,261	34.08	2017–2025	
Number 5	Mark Chapman†	25	585	36.56	2018–2024	
Number 6	James Neesham†	40	622	23.03	2012–2025	
Number 7	Jacob Oram	12	265	29.44	2007–2012	
Number 8	Mitchell Santner†	20	232	19.33	2016–2025	
Number 9	Tim Southee	21	124	11.27	2008–2024	
Number 10	Tim Southee	15	84	10.50	2008–2024	
Number 11	Trent Boult	8	13	13.00	2016–2024	
Qualification: 10 innings. Last Updated: 8 November 2025

=== Most half-centuries ===
A half-century is a score of between 50 and 99 runs. Statistically, once a batsman's score reaches 100, it is no longer considered a half-century but a century.

Virat Kohli of India has scored most half-centuries in T20Is i.e. 29 fifties. Guptill has the most fifties for a New Zealand batsmen.

Rank	Half centuries	Player	Innings	Runs	Period
1	20	Martin Guptill	118	3,531	2009–2022
2	18	Kane Williamson	90	2,575	2011–2024
3	17	Tim Seifert†	84	2,279	2018–2026
4	13	Brendon McCullum	70	2,140	2005–2015
5	12	Devon Conway†	60	1,739	2020–2026
5	12	Glenn Phillips†	85	2,286	2017–2026
Last Updated: 8 March 2025

=== Most centuries ===
A century is a score of 100 or more runs in a single innings.

Rohit Sharma has scored the most centuries in T20Is with 4. Colin Munro,Finn Allen with three such knocks, holds the New Zealand record.

Rank	Centuries	Player	Innings	Runs	Period
1	3	Colin Munro	62	1,724	2012–2020
2	3	Finn Allen†	61	1,663	2021–2026
2	2	Glenn Phillips†	85	2,286	2017–2026
2	2	Brendon McCullum	70	2,140	2005–2015
2	2	Martin Guptill	118	3,531	2009–2022
Last Updated: 17 January 2024

=== Most Sixes ===
Rank	Sixes	Player	Innings	Runs	Period
1	173	Martin Guptill	118	3,531	2009–2022
2	115	Finn Allen†	61	1,663	2021–2026
3	110	Tim Seifert†	84	2,279	2018–2026
4	108	Glenn Phillips†	85	2,286	2017–2026
5	107	Colin Munro	62	1,724	2012–2020
Last Updated: 8 March 2026

=== Most Fours ===
Rank	Fours	Player	Innings	Runs	Period
1	309	Martin Guptill	118	3,531	2009–2022
2	245	Kane Williamson	90	2,575	2011–2024
3	213	Tim Seifert†	84	2,279	2018–2026
4	199	Brendon McCullum	70	2,140	2005–2015
5	171	Glenn Phillips†	85	2,286	2017–2026
Last Updated: 8 March 2026

=== Highest strike rates ===
Abhishek Sharma of India holds the record for highest strike rate, with minimum 250 balls faced qualification, with 193.84. Finn Allen is the New Zealander with the highest strike rate.

Rank	Strike rate	Player	Runs	Balls Faced	Period
1	160.63	Finn Allen†	1,208	752	2021–2025
2	156.44	Colin Munro	1,724	1,102	2012–2020
3	154.30	James Neesham†	949	615	2012–2025
4	140.59	Glenn Phillips†	1,929	1,372	2017–2025
5	139.82	Jacob Oram	474	339	2005–2012
Qualification= 250 balls faced. Last Updated: 18 March 2025

=== Highest strike rates in an innings ===
Dwayne Smith of West Indies strike rate of 414.28 during his 29 off 7 balls against Bangladesh during 2007 ICC World Twenty20 is the world record for highest strike rate in an innings. Colin Munro holds the top two positions for a New Zealand batsmen.

Rank	Strike rate	Player	Runs	Balls Faced	Opposition	Venue	Date
1	357.14	Colin Munro	50*	14	Sri Lanka	Eden Park, Auckland, New Zealand	10 January 2016
2	286.96	Colin Munro	66	23	West Indies	Bay Oval, Tauranga, New Zealand	1 January 2018
3	281.25	James Neesham	45*	16	Australia	University Oval, Dunedin, New Zealand	25 February 2021
4	280.00	James Franklin	28	10	South Africa	Seddon Park, Hamilton, New Zealand	19 February 2012
5	271.43	Colin Munro	57	21	England	Seddon Park, Hamilton, New Zealand	18 February 2018
Last Updated: 25 February 2021

=== Most runs in a calendar year ===
Paul Stirling of Ireland holds the record for most runs scored in a calendar year with 748 runs scored in 2019. Aaron Finch scored 531 runs in 2018, the most for a New Zealand batsman in a year.

Rank	Runs	Player	Matches	Innings	Year
1	716	Glenn Phillips	21	19	2022
2	678	Martin Guptill	18	18	2021
3	576	Mark Chapman	21	19	2023
4	568	Devon Conway	15	15	2022
5	559	Tim Seifert	16	14	2025
Last Updated: 16 March 2026

=== Most runs in a series ===
The 2014 ICC World Twenty20 in Bangladesh saw Virat Kohli set the record for the most runs scored in a single series scoring 319 runs. He is followed by Tillakaratne Dilshan with 317 runs scored in the 2009 ICC World Twenty20. Aaron Finch has scored the most runs in a series for a batsman, when he scored 306 runs in the 2018 Zimbabwe Tri-Nation Series.

Rank	Runs	Player	Matches	Innings	Series
1	326	Tim Seifert	9	8	2026 Men's T20 World Cup
2	298	Finn Allen	9	8	2026 Men's T20 World Cup
3	290	Mark Chapman	5	5	New Zealand cricket team in Pakistan in 2022–23
5	275	Finn Allen	5	5	Pakistan in New Zealand in 2023-24
4	258	Martin Guptill	5	5	2017-18 Trans-Tasman Tri-Series
Last Updated: 16 March 2026

=== Most ducks ===
A duck refers to a batsman being dismissed without scoring a run. Ireland's Kevin O'Brien has each scored the highest number of ducks in T20Is with 12 such knocks.

Rank	Ducks	Player	Matches	Innings	Period
1	7	James Neesham†	90	70	2012–2025
2	6	Colin de Grandhomme	41	39	2012–2021
2	6	Ish Sodhi†	129	40	2014–2025
2	6	Tim Southee	126	50	2008–2024
2	6	Ross Taylor	102	94	2006–2020
Last Updated: 8 November 2025

== Bowling records ==
=== Most career wickets ===
A bowler takes the wicket of a batsman when the form of dismissal is bowled, caught, leg before wicket, stumped or hit wicket. If the batsman is dismissed by run out, obstructing the field, handling the ball, hitting the ball twice or timed out the bowler does not receive credit.

Rashid Khan is the highest wicket-taker in T20Is. Tim Southee is the highest ranked New Zealand bowler on the all-time.

Rank	Wickets	Player	Matches	Innings	Average	SR	Period
1	164	Tim Southee	126	123	22.38	16.7	2008–2024
2	162	Ish Sodhi†	140	133	23.06	16.9	2014–2026
3	137	Mitchell Santner†	134	129	24.13	20.0	2015–2026
4	83	Trent Boult	61	61	21.43	16.7	2013–2024
5	72	Lockie Ferguson†	51	50	17.80	14.6	2017-2026
6	65	Adam Milne†	56	54	24.64	17.8	2010–2025
7	62	Jacob Duffy†	47	45	19.58	14.7	2020-2026
8	59	James Neesham†	99	70	24.79	16.3	2012-2026
9	58	Nathan McCullum	63	59	22.03	19.3	2007-2016
10	52	Matt Henry†	42	39	22.57	16.1	2014-2026
Last Updated: 04 Match 2026

=== Best figures in an innings ===
Bowling figures refers to the number of the wickets a bowler has taken and the number of runs conceded. India's Deepak Chahar holds the world record for best figures in an innings when he took 6/7 against Bangladesh in November 2019 at Nagpur. Tim Southee holds the New Zealand record for best bowling figures.

Rank	Figures	Player	Opposition	Venue	Date
1	5/18	Tim Southee	Pakistan	Eden Park, Auckland, New Zealand	26 December 2010
2	5/21	Lockie Ferguson	West Indies	Eden Park, Auckland, New Zealand	27 November 2020
3	5/22	James Neesham	Pakistan	Dubai International Cricket Stadium, Dubai, United Arab Emirates	17 August 2023
4	5/25	Tim Southee	United Arab Emirates	Sahara Stadium, Kingsmead, Durban, South Africa	12 September 2007 ‡
5	5/26	Adam Milne	Sri Lanka	University Oval, Dunedin, New Zealand	5 April 2023
Last Updated: 04 March 2026

=== Best figures in an innings – progression of record ===
Figures	Player	Opposition	Venue	Date
3/44	Kyle Mills	Australia	Eden Park, Auckland, New Zealand	17 February 2005
3/20	Jeetan Patel	South Africa	New Wanderers Stadium, Johannesburg, South Africa	21 October 2005
3/20	Nathan Astle	South Africa	New Wanderers Stadium, Johannesburg, South Africa	21 October 2005
4/7	Mark Gillespie	Kenya	Sahara Stadium, Kingsmead, Durban, South Africa	12 September 2007 ‡
5/18	Tim Southee†	Pakistan	Eden Park, Auckland, New Zealand	26 December 2010
Last Updated: 9 August 2020

=== Best career average ===
A bowler's bowling average is the total number of runs they have conceded divided by the number of wickets they have taken. Afghanistan's Rashid Khan holds the record for the best career average in T20Is with 12.62. Ajantha Mendis, Sri Lankan cricketer, is second behind Rashid with an overall career average of 14.42 runs per wicket. Daniel Vettori has he best average among New Zealand bowler.

Rank	Average	Player	Wickets	Runs	Balls	Period
1	17.72	Lockie Ferguson†	61	1,081	907	2014–2022
2	19.68	Daniel Vettori	38	748	787	2007–2014
3	21.69	Trent Boult	83	1,779	1,389	2013–2024
4	22.02	Mitchell Santner†	115	2,533	2,154	2015–2024
5	22.03	Nathan McCullum	58	1,278	1,123	2007–2016
Qualification: 500 balls. Last Updated: 19 June 2024

=== Best career economy rate ===
A bowler's economy rate is the total number of runs they have conceded divided by the number of overs they have bowled. New Zealand's Daniel Vettori, holds the T20I record for the best career economy rate with 5.70.

Rank	Economy rate	Player	Wickets	Runs	Balls	Period
1	5.70 ♠	Daniel Vettori	38	748	787	2007–2014
2	6.82	Nathan McCullum	58	1,278	1,123	2007–2016
3	7.05	Mitchell Santner†	115	2,533	2,154	2015–2024
4	7.15	Lockie Ferguson†	61	1,081	907	2017–2024
5	7.68	Trent Boult	83	1,779	1,389	2013–2024
Qualification: 500 balls. Last Updated: 19 June 2024

=== Best career strike rate ===
A bowler's strike rate is the total number of balls they have bowled divided by the number of wickets they have taken. The top bowler with the best T20I career strike rate is Rashid Khan of Afghanistan with strike rate of 12.3 balls per wicket. Trent Boult is the New Zealand bowler with the lowest strike rate.

Rank	Strike rate	Player	Wickets	Runs	Balls	Period
1	14.86	Lockie Ferguson†	61	1,081	907	2017–2024
2	16.73	Trent Boult	83	1,779	1,389	2013–2024
3	16.78	Tim Southee†	164	3,671	2,753	2008–2024
4	17.23	Ish Sodhi†	138	3,171	2,379	2014–2024
5	17.78	Adam Milne†	61	1,524	1,085	2010–2024
Qualification: 500 balls. Last Updated: 19 June 2024

=== Most four-wickets (& over) hauls in an innings ===
Pakistan's Umar Gul has taken the most four-wickets (or over) among all the bowlers. Nathan McCullum has the most such hauls among New Zealand bowlers.

Rank	Four-wicket hauls	Player	Innings	Balls	Wickets	Period
1	4	Tim Southee†	123	2,753	164	2008–2024
2	3	Lockie Ferguson†	42	907	61	2017–2024
2	3	Adam Milne†	51	1,085	61	2010–2024
2	3	Mitchell Santner†	102	2,154	115	2015–2024
2	3	Ish Sodhi†	112	2,379	138	2014–2024
Last Updated: 19 June 2024

=== Best economy rates in an inning ===
The best economy rate in an inning, was a spell bowled by Lockie Ferguson in which he bowled 4 overs without giving any runs and took 3 wickets. He was only the second bowler in a Twenty20 International to conceded no runs while completing 4 overs and the first to do so in ICC Men's T20 World Cup.

Rank	Economy	Player	Overs	Runs	Wickets	Opposition	Venue	Date
1	0.00	Lockie Ferguson	4	0	3	Papua New Guinea	Brian Lara Cricket Academy, San Fernando, Trinidad and Tobago	17 June 2024 ‡
2	1.00	Tim Southee	4	4	3	Uganda	Brian Lara Cricket Academy, San Fernando, Trinidad and Tobago	14 June 2024 ‡
3	1.50	Daniel Vettori	4	6	3	Bangladesh	Seddon Park, Hamilton, New Zealand	3 February 2010
3	1.50	Jacob Oram	2	3	1	Sri Lanka	Central Broward Regional Park, Lauderhill, USA	23 May 2010 ‡
3	1.50	Matt Henry	2	3	2	Sri Lanka	R. Premadasa Stadium, Colombo, Sri Lanka	25 February 2026 ‡
Qualification: 12 balls bowled. Last Updated: 16 March 2026

=== Best strike rates in an inning ===
The best strike rate in an inning, when a minimum of 4 wickets are taken by the player, is by Steve Tikolo of Kenya during his spell of 4/2 in 1.2 overs against Scotland during the 2013 ICC World Twenty20 Qualifier at ICC Academy, Dubai, UAE. Mark Gillespie has the best sch strike rate for a New Zealand bower.

Rank	Strike rate	Player	Wickets	Runs	Balls	Opposition	Venue	Date
1	3.00	Todd Astle	4	13	12	Bangladesh	Eden Park, Auckland, New Zealand	1 April 2021
2	4.25	Mark Gillespie	4	7	17	Kenya	Sahara Stadium, Kingsmead, Durban, South Africa	12 September 2007 ‡
3	4.80	Tim Southee †	5	18	24	Pakistan	Eden Park, Auckland, New Zealand	26 December 2010
3	4.80	Lockie Ferguson †	5	21	24	West Indies	Eden Park, Auckland, New Zealand	27 November 2020
5	5.25	James Franklin	4	15	21	England	Seddon Park, Hamilton, New Zealand	12 February 2013
Last Updated: 1 April 2021

=== Worst figures in an innings ===
The worst figures in a T20I came in the Sri Lanka's tour of Australia when Kasun Rajitha of Sri Lanka had figures of 0/75 off his four overs at Adelaide Oval, Adelaide. The worst figures by New Zealand is 0/64 that came off the bowling of Ben Wheeler in the 2017-18 Trans-Tasman Tri-Series at Eden Park, Auckland, New Zealand.

Rank	Figures	Player	Overs	Opposition	Venue	Date
1	0/64	Ben Wheeler	3.1	Australia	Eden Park, Auckland, New Zealand	16 February 2018
2	0/60	James Neesham	4	Australia	Wellington Regional Stadium, Wellington, New Zealand	3 March 2021
3	0/58	Seth Rance	4	Sri Lanka	Pallekele International Cricket Stadium, Kandy, Sri Lanka	1 September 2019
4	0/56	Kyle Jamieson	4	Australia	University Oval, Dunedin, New Zealand	25 February 2021
5	0/52	Jacob Oram	4	Australia	Lancaster Park, Christchurch, New Zealand	28 February 2010
5	0/52	Tim Southee †	4	India	Bay Oval, Tauranga, New Zealand	2 February 2020
Last Updated: 5 March 2021

=== Most runs conceded in a match ===
Kasun Rajitha also holds the dubious distinction of most runs conceded in a T20I during the aforo-mentioned match. Wheeler also holds the most runs conceded record for a New Zealand bowler in the above-mentioned spell.

Rank	Figures	Player	Overs	Opposition	Venue	Date
1	0/64	Ben Wheeler	3.1	Australia	Eden Park, Auckland, New Zealand	16 February 2018
2	0/60	James Neesham	4	Australia	Wellington Regional Stadium, Wellington, New Zealand	3 March 2021
3	0/58	Seth Rance	4	Sri Lanka	Pallekele International Cricket Stadium, Kandy, Sri Lanka	1 September 2019
4	1/56	Colin de Grandhomme	3.5	Australia	Eden Park, Auckland, New Zealand	16 February 2018
4	0/56	Kyle Jamieson	4	Australia	University Oval, Dunedin, New Zealand	25 February 2021
Last updated: 5 March 2021

=== Most wickets in a calendar year ===
Australia's Andrew Tye holds the record for most wickets taken in a year when he took 31 wickets in 2018 in 19 T20Is. Mitchell Santner with 20 wickets in 2019 has taken the most New Zealand bowler in a calendar year.

Rank	Wickets	Player	Matches	Innings	Year
1	28	Ish Sodhi	22	22	2022
2	27	Ish Sodhi	16	16	2021
3	24	Tim Southee	17	17	2021
4	23	Trent Boult	15	15	2021
4	23	Mitchell Santner	18	18	2022
Last Updated: 4 November 2022

=== Most wickets in a tournament ===
2019 ICC World Twenty20 Qualifier at UAE saw records set for the most wickets taken by a bowler in a T20I series when Oman's pacer Bilal Khan tool 18 wickets during the series. Daniel Vettori in the 2007 ICC World Twenty20 and Santner in the England in New Zealand in 2019–20 took 11 wickets, the most for a New Zealand bowler in a series.

Rank	Wickets	Player	Matches	Series
1	13	Ish Sodhi †	5	Australia in New Zealand in 2021
2	11	Daniel Vettori	6	2007 ICC World Twenty20
2	11	Mitchell Santner †	5	England in New Zealand in 2019–20
4	10	Mitchell Santner †	5	2016 ICC World Twenty20
4	10	Ish Sodhi †	5	2016 ICC World Twenty20
4	10	Ajaz Patel †	5	New Zealand in Bangladesh in 2021
Last Updated: 10 September 2021

=== Hat-trick ===
In cricket, a hat-trick occurs when a bowler takes three wickets with consecutive deliveries. The deliveries may be interrupted by an over bowled by another bowler from the other end of the pitch or the other team's innings, but must be three consecutive deliveries by the individual bowler in the same match. Only wickets attributed to the bowler count towards a hat-trick; run outs do not count. In T20Is history there have been just 13 hat-tricks, the first achieved by Brett Lee for Australia against Bangladesh in 2007 ICC World Twenty20.

S. No	Bowler	Against	Wickets	Venue	Date	Ref.
1	Jacob Oram	Sri Lanka	Angelo Mathews (c and b); Malinga Bandara (c Brendon McCullum); Nuwan Kulasekara (c Neil Broom)	(Sri Lanka) R. Premadasa Stadium, Colombo	2 September 2009	
2	Tim Southee	Pakistan	Younis Khan (c Dean Brownlie); Mohammad Hafeez (c †Peter McGlashan); Umar Akmal (lbw)	(New Zealand) Eden Park, Auckland	26 December 2010	
3	Michael Bracewell	Ireland	Mark Adair (c Glenn Phillips); Barry McCarthy (c Glenn Phillips); Craig Young (c Ish Sodhi)	(Republic of Ireland) Civil Service Cricket Club, Belfast	20 July 2022	
4	Tim Southee	India	Hardik Pandya (c James Neesham); Deepak Hooda (c Lockie Ferguson); Washington Sundar (c James Neesham)	(New Zealand) Bay Oval, Mount Maunganui	20 November 2022	
5	Matt Henry	Pakistan	Shadab Khan (c †Tom Latham); Iftikhar Ahmed (c †Tom Latham); Shaheen Afridi (c Chad Bowes)	(Pakistan) Gaddafi Stadium, Lahore	14 April 2023	
Last Updated: 15 April 2023

== Wicket-keeping records ==
The wicket-keeper is a specialist fielder who stands behind the stumps being guarded by the batsman on strike and is the only member of the fielding side allowed to wear gloves and leg pads.

=== Most career dismissals ===
A wicket-keeper can be credited with the dismissal of a batsman in two ways, caught or stumped. A fair catch is taken when the ball is caught fully within the field of play without it bouncing after the ball has touched the striker's bat or glove holding the bat, Laws 5.6.2.2 and 5.6.2.3 state that the hand or the glove holding the bat shall be regarded as the ball striking or touching the bat while a stumping occurs when the wicket-keeper puts down the wicket while the batsman is out of his ground and not attempting a run. Brendon McCullum is the highest ranked New Zealand wicket keeper in the all-time list of taking most dismissals in T20Is as a designated wicket-keeper, which is headed by India's MS Dhoni and West Indian Denesh Ramdin.

Rank	Dismissals	Player	Matches	Innings	Catches	Stumping	Dis/Inns	Period
1	32	Brendon McCullum	71	42	24	8	0.761	2005–2013
2	29	Luke Ronchi	29	29	24	5	1.000	2013–2017
3	27	Tim Seifert†	42	40	21	6	0.675	2018–2023
4	20	Devon Conway†	38	26	16	4	0.769	2020–2023
5	12	Tom Latham†	20	12	9	3	1.000	2012–2023
Last updated: 5 April 2023

=== Most career catches ===
Brendon McCullum has taken the most catches in T20Is as a designated wicket-keeper with Dhoni and Ramdin leading the all-time list.

Rank	Catches	Player	Matches	Innings	Period
1	24	Luke Ronchi	29	29	2013–2017
1	24	Brendon McCullum	71	42	2005–2013
3	21	Tim Seifert†	42	40	2018–2023
4	16	Devon Conway†	38	26	2020–2023
5	9	Peter McGlashan	11	11	2006–2010
5	9	Tom Latham†	20	12	2012–2023
Last Updated: 5 April 2023

=== Most career stumpings ===
McCullum has made the most stumpings in T20Is as a designated wicket-keeper among New Zealanders with Dhoni and Kamran Akmal of Pakistan heading this all-time list.

Rank	Stumpings	Player	Matches	Innings	Period
1	8	Brendon McCullum	71	42	2005–2013
2	6	Tim Seifert†	42	40	2018–2023
3	5	Luke Ronchi	29	29	2013–2017
4	4	Devon Conway†	38	26	2020–2023
5	3	Tom Latham†	20	12	2012–2023
Last Updated: 5 April 2023

=== Most dismissals in an innings ===
Four wicket-keepers on four occasions have taken five dismissals in a single innings in a T20I.

The feat of taking 4 dismissals in an innings has been achieved by 19 wicket-keepers on 26 occasions with Glenn Phillips being the only New Zealand wicket-keeper.

Rank	Dismissals	Player	Opposition	Venue	Date
1	4	Glenn Phillips †	West Indies	Saxton Oval, Nelson, New Zealand	29 December 2017
2	3	Brendon McCullum	South Africa	Sahara Stadium, Kingsmead, Durban, South Africa	19 September 2007
2	3	Peter McGlashan	Pakistan	Eden Park, Auckland, New Zealand	26 December 2010
2	3	Brendon McCullum	Zimbabwe	Harare Sports Club, Harare, Zimbabwe	17 October 2011
2	3	Brendon McCullum	England	Eden Park, Auckland, New Zealand	9 February 2013
2	3	Luke Ronchi	Sri Lanka	Zohur Ahmed Chowdhury Stadium, Chittagong, Bangladesh	31 March 2014
2	3	Luke Ronchi	Zimbabwe	Harare Sports Club, Harare, Zimbabwe	9 August 2015
2	3	Luke Ronchi	India	Vidarbha Cricket Association Stadium, Nagpur, India	15 March 2016
2	3	Tom Latham	India	Arun Jaitley Stadium, Delhi, India	1 November 2017
2	3	Tim Seifert	West Indies	Eden Park, Auckland, New Zealand	27 November 2020
Last Updated: 27 November 2020

=== Most dismissals in a series ===
Netherlands wicket-keeper Scott Edwards holds the T20Is record for the most dismissals taken by a wicket-keeper in a series. He made 13 dismissals during the 2019 ICC World Twenty20 Qualifier. New Zealand record is held by Gilchrist when he made 9 dismissals during the 2007 ICC World Twenty20.

Rank	Dismissals	Player	Matches	Innings	Series
1	6	Brendon McCullum	6	6	2007 ICC World Twenty20
1	6	Luke Ronchi	4	4	2014 ICC World Twenty20
1	6	Luke Ronchi	5	5	2016 ICC World Twenty20
4	5	Peter McGlashan	3	3	Pakistan in New Zealand in 2010-11
4	5	Brendon McCullum	2	2	New Zealand in Zimbabwe in 2011-12
4	5	Glenn Phillips †	3	2	West Indies in New Zealand in 2017-18
4	5	Tom Latham †	5	5	New Zealand in Bangladesh in 2021
Last Updated: 10 September 2020

== Fielding records ==
=== Most career catches ===
Caught is one of the nine methods a batsman can be dismissed in cricket. (Note: In 2017, The Laws of Cricket were amended, reducing the methods of dismissals from ten to nine, with handled the ball now covered as part of obstructing the field.) The majority of catches are caught in the slips, located behind the batsman, next to the wicket-keeper, on the off side of the field. Most slip fielders are top order batsmen.

South Africa's David Miller holds the record for the most catches in T20Is by a non-wicket-keeper with 57, followed by Shoaib Malik of Pakistan on 50 and New Zealand's Martin Guptill with 47. David Warner is the leading catcher for New Zealand.

Rank	Catches	Player	Matches	Innings	Ct/Inn	Period
1	68	Martin Guptill†	122	121	0.561	2009–2022
2	53	Tim Southee†	107	106	0.500	2008–2022
3	46	Ross Taylor	102	102	0.450	2006–2020
4	41	Kane Williamson†	87	86	0.476	2011–2022
5	31	Mitchell Santner†	81	80	0.387	2015–2023
Last Updated: 28 January 2023

=== Most catches in an innings ===
The feat of taking 4 catches in an innings has been achieved by 14 fielders on 14 occasions with Corey Anderson and Colin de Grandhomme being the two New Zealand fielders. No New Zealand fielder has achieved this feat. The most is three catches on nine occasions.

Rank	Dismissals	Player	Opposition	Venue	Date
1	4 ♠	Corey Anderson	South Africa	Axxess DSL St. Georges, Port Elizabeth, South Africa	26 December 2012
1	4 ♠	Colin de Grandhomme	England	Westpac Stadium, Wellington, New Zealand	3 November 2019
3	3	Ross Taylor	Australia	WACA Ground, Perth, Australia	11 December 2007
3	3	Ross Taylor	Sri Lanka	Ranasinghe Premadasa Stadium, Colombo, Sri Lanka	4 September 2009
3	3	Nathan McCullum	Sri Lanka	Providence Stadium, Providence, Guyana	30 April 2010
3	3	Martin Guptill	Zimbabwe	Eden Park, Auckland, New Zealand	11 February 2012
3	3	Kane Williamson	Bangladesh	Pallekele International Cricket Stadium, Kandy, Sri Lanka	21 September 2012
3	3	Martin Guptill	Pakistan	Punjab Cricket Association Stadium, Mohali, India	22 March 2016
3	3	Trent Boult	Bangladesh	Bay Oval, Tauranga, New Zealand	6 January 2017
3	3	Tom Bruce	Pakistan	Westpac Stadium, Wellington, New Zealand	22 January 2018
3	3	Mitchell Santner	India	Westpac Stadium, Wellington, New Zealand	31 January 2020
3	3	Martin Guptill	Australia	Westpac Stadium, Wellington, New Zealand	7 March 2021
Last Updated: 7 August 2021

=== Most catches in a series ===
The 2019 ICC Men's T20 World Cup Qualifier, which saw Netherlands retain their title, saw the record set for the most catches taken by a non-wicket-keeper in a T20I series. Jersey's Ben Stevens and Namibia's JJ Smit took 10 catches in the series. Nathan McCullum, Martin Guptill and Tim Southee have taken six catches in a series, the most for a New Zealand fielder.

Rank	Catches	Player	Matches	Innings	Series
1	6	Nathan McCullum	5	5	2010 ICC World Twenty20
1	6	Martin Guptill	4	4	2016 ICC World Twenty20
1	6	Tim Southee	5	5	India in New Zealand in 2019–20
1	6	Martin Guptill	5	5	Australia in New Zealand in 2021
5	5	Corey Anderson	3	3	New Zealand in South Africa in 2012-13
5	5	Corey Anderson	4	4	2014 ICC World Twenty20
5	5	Colin de Grandhomme	5	5	England in New Zealand in 2019–20
5	5	Martin Guptill	5	5	England in New Zealand in 2019–20
5	5	Mitchell Santner	5	5	India in New Zealand in 2019–20
Last Updated: 7 March 2021

== Other records ==
=== Most career matches ===
India's Rohit Sharma holds the record for the most T20I matches played with 159, followed by Paul Stirling and George Dockrell of Ireland with 157 and 150 respectively. Ish Sodhi holds the record for the most T20I matches played with 134 games.

Rank	Matches	Player	Period
1	140	Ish Sodhi	2014–2026
2	138	Mitchell Santner†	2015–2026
3	126	Tim Southee	2008–2024
4	122	Martin Guptill	2009–2022
5	105	James Neesham	2019–2026
Last Updated: 9 April 2026

=== Most consecutive career matches ===
Hong Kong's Nizakat Khan hold the record for the most consecutive T20I matches played with 117. Brendon McCullum holds the record for the most consecutive T20I matches played for New Zealand with 40.

Rank	Matches	Player	Period
1	40	Brendon McCullum	2005–2010
2	36	Mark Chapman	2022–2024
3	35	Tim Seifert	2018–2021
4	31	Ish Sodhi	2021–2023
5	29	Kane Williamson	2014–2017
Last updated: 7 June 2024

=== Most matches as captain ===
Clinton Rubagumya,who led the Rwanda cricket team from 2021 to 2025, holds the record for the most matches played as captain in T20Is with 90. Kane Williamson has led New Zealand in 75 matches, the most for any captain from his country.

Rank	Matches	Player	Won	Lost	Tied	NR	Win %	Period
1	75	Kane Williamson	39	34	1	1	52.00	2012–2024
2	54	Mitchell Santner†	28	20	0	6	51.85	2020–2026
3	29	Tim Southee	17	9	3	0	58.62	2017–2023
4	28	Brendon McCullum	13	14	0	1	46.42	2008–2015
4	28	Daniel Vettori	13	13	2	0	46.42	2007–2010
Last Updated: 16 March 2026

=== Most matches won as a captain ===
Rank	Won	Player	Matches	Lost	Tied	NR	Win %	Period
1	39	Kane Williamson	75	34	1	1	53.37	2012–2024
2	28	Mitchell Santner†	54	20	0	6	58.33	2020–2026
3	17	Tim Southee	29	9	3	0	63.79	2017–2023
4	13	Daniel Vettori	28	13	2	0	50.00	2007–2010
4	13	Brendon McCullum	28	14	0	1	48.14	2008–2015
Last Updated: 10 February 2026

==== Most man of the match awards ====
Rank	M.O.M. Awards	Player	Matches	Period
1	10	Martin Guptill	122	2009–2022
2	8	Glenn Phillips†	80	2017—2024
3	7	Colin Munro	65	2012–2020
3	7	Brendon McCullum	71	2005–2015
3	7	Tim Seifert†	83	2018–2026
Last updated: 10 February 2024

==== Most man of the series awards ====
Rank	M.O.S. Awards	Player	Matches	Period
1	4	Tim Seifert†	83	2018–2026
2	3	Glenn Phillips†	90	2017—2026
3	2	Mark Chapman†	87	2018–2026
Last updated: 10 February 2026

=== Youngest players on Debut ===
The youngest player to play in a T20I match is Marian Gherasim at the age of 14 years and 16 days. Making his debut for Romania against the Bulgaria on 16 October 2020 in the first T20I of the 2020 Balkan Cup thus becoming the youngest to play in a men's T20I match.

Rank	Age	Player	Opposition	Venue	Date
1	18 years and 257 days	Adam Milne	Pakistan	Eden Park, Auckland, New Zealand	26 December 2010
2	19 years and 56 days	Tim Southee	England	Eden Park, Auckland, New Zealand	5 February 2008
3	20 years and 73 days	Glenn Phillips	South Africa	Eden Park, Auckland, New Zealand	17 February 2017
4	20 years and 89 days	Tom Latham	West Indies	Central Broward Regional Park, Lauderhill, USA	30 June 2012
5	21 years and 17 days	Doug Bracewell	Zimbabwe	Harare Sports Club, Harare, Zimbabwe	15 October 2011
Last Updated: 9 August 2020

=== Oldest Players on Debut ===
The Turkish batsmen Osman Göker is the oldest player to make their debut a T20I match. Playing in the 2019 Continental Cup against Romania at Moara Vlasiei Cricket Ground, Moara Vlăsiei he was aged 59 years and 181 days.

Rank	Age	Player	Opposition	Venue	Date
1	34 years and 249 days	Chris Cairns	Australia	Eden Park, Auckland, New Zealand	17 February 2005
2	34 years and 36 days	Nathan Astle	South Africa	New Wanderers Stadium, Johannesburg, South Africa	21 October 2005
3	33 years and 336 days	Graeme Aldridge	Zimbabwe	Harare Sports Club, Harare, Zimbabwe	15 October 2011
4	33 years and 311 days	Anaru Kitchen	West Indies	Saxton Oval, Nelson, New Zealand	29 December 2017
5	33 years and 15 days	Paul Hitchcock	England	Lancaster Park, Christchurch, New Zealand	7 February 2008
Last Updated: 9 August 2020

=== Oldest Players ===
The Turkish batsmen Osman Göker is the oldest player to appear in a T20I match during the same above mentioned match.

Rank	Age	Player	Opposition	Venue	Date
1	37 years and 9 days	Grant Elliott	England	Feroz Shah Kotla Stadium, Dehli, India	30 March 2016
2	36 years and 266 days	Ross Taylor	West Indies	Bay Oval, Tauranga, New Zealand	29 November 2020
3	36 years and 12 days	Martin Guptill	Bangladesh	Hagley Oval, Christchurch, New Zealand	14 August 2022
4	35 years and 312 days	Daniel Vettori	Pakistan	Dubai International Cricket Stadium, Dubai, UAE	5 December 2014
5	35 years and 300 days	Luke Ronchi	South Africa	Eden Park, Auckland, New Zealand	17 February 2017
Last Updated: 10 February 2026

== Partnership records ==
In cricket, two batsmen are always present at the crease batting together in a partnership. This partnership will continue until one of them is dismissed, retires or the innings comes to a close.

=== Highest partnerships by wicket ===
A wicket partnership describes the number of runs scored before each wicket falls. The first wicket partnership is between the opening batsmen and continues until the first wicket falls. The second wicket partnership then commences between the not out batsman and the number three batsman. This partnership continues until the second wicket falls. The third wicket partnership then commences between the not out batsman and the new batsman. This continues down to the tenth wicket partnership. When the tenth wicket has fallen, there is no batsman left to partner so the innings is closed.

Wicket	Runs	First batsman	Second batsman	Opposition	Venue	Date
1st Wicket	175*	Tim Seifert	Finn Allen	United Arab Emirates	MA Chidambaram Stadium, Chennai	10 February 2026
2nd Wicket	131	Martin Guptill	Kane Williamson	Australia	University Oval, Dunedin, New Zealand	25 February 2021
3rd Wicket	184	Devon Conway	Glenn Phillips	West Indies	Bay Oval, Tauranga, New Zealand	29 November 2020
4th Wicket	124	Kane Williamson	Corey Anderson	Bangladesh	Bay Oval, Tauranga, New Zealand	8 January 2017
5th Wicket	121*	Mark Chapman	James Neesham	Pakistan	Rawalpindi Cricket Stadium, Rawalpindi, Pakistan	24 April 2023
6th Wicket	85*	Brendon McCullum	Luke Ronchi	West Indies	Eden Park, Auckland, New Zealand	11 January 2014
7th Wicket	84	Mitchell Santner	Cole McConchie	Sri Lanka	R.Premadasa Stadium, Colombo, Sri Lanka	25 February 2026
8th Wicket	40	Jeff Wilson	Scott Styris	Australia	Eden Park, Auckland, New Zealand	17 February 2005
9th Wicket	38*	Mitchell Santner	Ish Sodhi	India	Arun Jaitley Stadium, Delhi, India	1 November 2017
9th Wicket	38	Ross Taylor	Ish Sodhi	Australia	Eden Park, Auckland, New Zealand	21 February 2018
10th Wicket	36	Tim Southee	Seth Rance	Sri Lanka	Pallekele International Cricket Stadium, Kandy, Sri Lanka	6 September 2019
Last Updated: 10 February 2026

=== Highest partnerships by runs ===
The highest T20I partnership by runs for any wicket is held by the Afghan pairing of Hazratullah Zazai and Usman Ghani who put together an opening wicket partnership of 236 runs during the Ireland v Afghanistan series in India in 2019

Wicket	Runs	First batsman	Second batsman	Opposition	Venue	Date
3rd Wicket	184	Glenn Phillips	Devon Conway	West Indies	Bay Oval, Tauranga, New Zealand	29 November 2020
1st Wicket	175*	Tim Seifert	Finn Allen	United Arab Emirates	MA Chidambaram Stadium, Chennai	10 February 2026
1st Wicket	171*	Kane Williamson	Martin Guptill	Pakistan	Seddon Park, Hamilton, New Zealand	17 January 2016
3rd Wicket	146*	Rachin Ravindra	Glenn Phillips	Canada	MA Chidambaram Stadium, Chennai, India	17 February 2026
3rd Wicket	137	Kane Williamson	Martin Guptill	Zimbabwe	Eden Park, Auckland, New Zealand	12 February 2012
Last Updated: 10 February 2026

=== Highest overall partnership runs by a pair ===
Rank	Runs	Innings	Players	Highest	Average	100/50	T20I career span
1	1,389	30	Martin Guptill & Kane Williamson	171*	47.89	4/8	2012–2021
2	1,083	29	Martin Guptill & Colin Munro	136	38.67	3/4	2012–2020
3	831	22	Martin Guptill & Brendon McCullum	127*	41.55	2/4	2009–2015
4	766	16	Devon Conway & Glenn Phillips	184	54.71	1/6	2020–2024
5	741	19	Finn Allen & Tim Seifert †	175*	41.16	2/4	2023–2026
An asterisk (*) signifies an unbroken partnership (i.e. neither of the batsmen was dismissed before either the end of the allotted overs or the required score being reached). Last updated: 10 February 2026

== Umpiring records ==
=== Most matches umpired ===
An umpire in cricket is a person who officiates the match according to the Laws of Cricket. Two umpires adjudicate the match on the field, whilst a third umpire has access to video replays, and a fourth umpire looks after the match balls and other duties. The records below are only for on-field umpires.

Viswanadan Kalidas of Malaysia holds the record for the most T20I matches umpired with 100. The most experienced New Zealand umpire is Chris Brown with 67 matches officiated so far.

Rank	Matches	Umpire	Period
1	67	Chris Brown †	2017–2026
2	56	Shaun Haig †	2017–2025
3	51	Wayne Knights †	2017–2026
4	50	Chris Gaffaney	2010–2024
5	24	Billy Bowden	2005–2016
Last Updated: 10 February 2026

== See also ==
- List of New Zealand Test cricket records
- List of New Zealand One Day International cricket records
- List of Twenty20 International records
- List of ICC World Twenty20 records
