= New Zealand cricket team in Scotland in 2022 =

International cricket tour

	Scotland	New Zealand
- Dates: 27 – 31 July 2022
Captains	Richie Berrington	Mitchell Santner

One Day International series
- Results: New Zealand won the 1-match series 1–0
Most runs	Michael Leask (85)	Mark Chapman (101)
Most wickets	Michael Leask (2)	Jacob Duffy (3); Michael Bracewell (3)

Twenty20 International series
- Results: New Zealand won the 2-match series 2–0
Most runs	Chris Greaves (68)	Finn Allen (107)
Most wickets	Gavin Main (2); Hamza Tahir (2)	Ish Sodhi (5)

The New Zealand cricket team toured in July 2022 to play two Twenty20 International (T20I) matches and a single One Day International (ODI). The matches were all played at The Grange Club in Edinburgh. The fixtures in Scotland made up the third leg of New Zealand's tour of the United Kingdom and Ireland, following a Test series in England and limited overs fixtures in Ireland.

New Zealand won the opening T20I match by 68 runs, after Finn Allen scored 101 runs. New Zealand scored their highest team total in a T20I match in the second fixture, with 254/5, with them going on to win by 102 runs and take the series 2–0. New Zealand won the one-off ODI match by seven wickets, with Mark Chapman scoring 101 not out. It was Chapman's first ODI century for New Zealand, after he had previously scored one for Hong Kong in November 2015.

== Background ==
The New Zealand cricket team was scheduled to tour Scotland in June 2020 to play a One Day International (ODI) match and a Twenty20 International (T20I) match. It would have been the first time since 2008 that the New Zealand team have toured Scotland. New Zealand were also scheduled to tour Ireland in the same month to play three ODIs and three Twenty20 Internationals (T20Is). Originally scheduled to be a one-off ODI match, Cricket Scotland announced the addition of the T20I match in December 2019.

The COVID-19 pandemic put the tour in doubt. In April 2020, David White, Chief Executive of New Zealand Cricket, said that the tour would be "most unlikely" to happen. Later the same month, Gus Mackay, Chief Executive of Cricket Scotland, said that they were willing to host the matches behind closed doors if necessary. However, the tour was postponed on 15 May 2020 as a result of the pandemic.

== Squads ==
ODI		T20Is	
Scotland	New Zealand	Scotland	New Zealand
Richie Berrington (c); Kyle Coetzer; Matthew Cross (wk); Alasdair Evans; Chris Greaves; Ollie Hairs; Michael Jones; Michael Leask; Calum MacLeod; Gavin Main; Christopher McBride; George Munsey; Adrian Neill; Safyaan Sharif; Chris Sole; Hamza Tahir; Craig Wallace; Mark Watt	Mitchell Santner (c); Finn Allen; Michael Bracewell; Mark Chapman; Dane Cleaver (wk); Jacob Duffy; Lockie Ferguson; Martin Guptill; ~~Adam Milne~~; Daryl Mitchell; James Neesham; Glenn Phillips; Michael Rippon; Ben Sears; Ish Sodhi; Blair Tickner	Richie Berrington (c); Matthew Cross (wk); Alasdair Evans; Chris Greaves; Ollie Hairs; Michael Jones; Michael Leask; Calum MacLeod; Gavin Main; Christopher McBride; George Munsey; Adrian Neill; Safyaan Sharif; Chris Sole; Hamza Tahir; Craig Wallace; Mark Watt	Mitchell Santner (c); Finn Allen; Michael Bracewell; Mark Chapman; Dane Cleaver (wk); Jacob Duffy; Lockie Ferguson; Martin Guptill; ~~Adam Milne~~; Daryl Mitchell; James Neesham; Glenn Phillips; Michael Rippon; Ben Sears; Ish Sodhi; Blair Tickner

Adam Milne was ruled out of New Zealand's squad due to an Achilles injury with Jacob Duffy named as his replacement.

== T20I series ==
=== 1st T20I ===
27 July 2022
14:30
Scorecard

New Zealand; 225/5 (20 overs)	v	Scotland; 157/8 (20 overs)
Finn Allen 101 (56); Richie Berrington 1/13 (1 over)		Calum MacLeod 33 (24); Ish Sodhi 4/28 (4 overs)

New Zealand won by 68 runs
The Grange Club, Edinburgh
Umpires: Allan Haggo (Sco) and Ryan Milne (Sco)
Player of the match: Finn Allen (NZ)

- Scotland won the toss and elected to field.
- Finn Allen (NZ) scored his first century in T20Is.

=== 2nd T20I ===
29 July 2022
14:30
Scorecard

New Zealand; 254/5 (20 overs)	v	Scotland; 152/9 (20 overs)
Mark Chapman 83 (44); Gavin Main 2/44 (4 overs)		Chris Greaves 37 (29); James Neesham 2/9 (1 over)

New Zealand won by 102 runs
The Grange Club, Edinburgh
Umpires: David McLean (Sco) and Ryan Milne (Sco)
Player of the match: Mark Chapman (NZ)

- New Zealand won the toss and elected to bat.
- Michael Jones (Sco) made his T20I debut.
- Michael Rippon also made his T20I debut for New Zealand after previously playing 18 T20Is for the Netherlands, becoming the 14th cricketer to represent two international teams in T20Is.
- New Zealand made their highest team total in T20Is.

== Only ODI ==
31 July 2022
11:00
Scorecard

Scotland; 306 (49.4 overs)	v	New Zealand; 307/3 (45.5 overs)
Michael Leask 85 (55); Michael Bracewell 3/43 (10 overs)		Mark Chapman 101* (75); Michael Leask 2/46 (8 overs)

New Zealand won by 7 wickets
The Grange Club, Edinburgh
Umpires: Allan Haggo (Sco) and David McLean (Sco)
Player of the match: Mark Chapman (NZ)

- Scotland won the toss and elected to bat.
- Dane Cleaver (NZ) made his ODI debut.
- Mark Chapman scored his first ODI century for New Zealand.
