= Indian A cricket team in New Zealand in 2018–19 =

Cricket tournament

Indian A cricket team in New Zealand in 2018-19
	New Zealand A	India A
- Dates: 16 November – 11 December 2018
Captains	Will Young (FC); Corey Anderson (LAs)	Ajinkya Rahane (1st FC); Karun Nair (2nd,3rd FC); Manish Pandey (LAs)

FC series
- Result: 3-match series drawn 0–0
Most runs	Will Young (189)	Mayank Agarwal (149)
Most wickets	Doug Bracewell (8)	Krishnappa Gowtham (9)

LA series
- Result: India A won the 3-match series 3–0
Most runs	George Worker (143)	Vijay Shankar (188)
Most wickets	Hamish Bennett (5)	Siddarth Kaul (7)

The India A cricket team toured New Zealand in November - December 2018 to play 3 first-class matches and 3 List-A matches against the New Zealand A cricket team. BCCI included Rohit Sharma, Murali Vijay and Ajinkya Rahane for India's first four-dayer match as a preparation for senior team's tour to Australia.

== Squads ==
First-class		List-A	
New Zealand A	India A	New Zealand A	India A
Will Young (c); George Worker; Tim Seifert (wk); Glenn Phillips (wk); Rachin Ravindra; Dane Cleaver (wk); Doug Bracewell; Kyle Jamieson; Seth Rance; Blair Tickner; Scott Kuggeleijn; Logan van Beek; Theo van Woerkom; Cam Fletcher; Lockie Ferguson	Ajinkya Rahane (c) (Only 1st FC match); Karun Nair (c) (For 2 & 3 FC matches); Murali Vijay (Only 1st FC match); Ravikumar Samarth; Prithvi Shaw (Only 1st FC match); ~~Rohit Sharma~~; Mayank Agarwal; Hanuma Vihari (Only 1st FC match); Parthiv Patel (wk) (Only 1st FC match); Krishnappa Gowtham; Shahbaz Nadeem; Mohammed Siraj; Navdeep Saini; Abhimanyu Easwaran; Deepak Chahar; Rajneesh Gurbani; Vijay Shankar; Srikar Bharat (wk); Ankit Bawne; Shubman Gill; Ishan Kishan (wk)	Corey Anderson (c); Will Young; George Worker; Tim Seifert (wk); Rachin Ravindra; James Neesham; Doug Bracewell; Hamish Rutherford; Seth Rance; Hamish Bennett; Cole McConchie; Daryl Mitchell; Lockie Ferguson	Manish Pandey (c); Mayank Agarwal; Anmolpreet Singh; Shubman Gill; Shreyas Iyer; Ankit Bawne; ~~Hardik Pandya~~; Ishan Kishan (wk); Axar Patel; Krunal Pandya; Siddarth Kaul; ~~Washington Sundar~~; ~~Deepak Chahar~~; Khaleel Ahmed; Navdeep Saini; Vijay Shankar; Krishnappa Gowtham

Initially Rohit Sharma was selected for the first four-day match but was later rested because of constant workload. Hardik Pandya was selected for the limited overs series, but due to his slower-than expected recovery from his back injury, he was pulled out of the team and asked to prove his fitness in the Ranji Trophy.

== First-Class series ==
=== 1st Unofficial Test ===
16-19 November 2018
Scorecard

India A	v	New Zealand A
467/8d (122.1 overs); Parthiv Patel 94 (136); Blair Tickner 4/80 (22.1 overs)		458/9d (134 overs); Hamish Rutherford 114 (181); Krishnappa Gowtham 3/107 (42 overs)
247/3 (65 overs); Murali Vijay 60 (113); Doug Bracewell 1/36 (10 overs)

Match Drawn
Bay Oval, Mount Maunganui
Umpires: Chris Brown (NZ) and Shaun Haig (NZ)

- India A won the toss and elected to bat.

=== 2nd Unofficial Test ===
23-26 November 2018
Scorecard

New Zealand A	v	India A
303/7d (106 overs); Will Young 123 (272); Mohammad Siraj 4/59 (23 overs)		159/2 (46 overs); Ravikumar Samarth 50* (83); Seth Rance 1/35 (10 overs); Blair Tickner 1/35 (10 overs)

Match Drawn
Seddon Park, Hamilton
Umpires: Chris Brown (NZ) and Ashley Mehrotra (NZ)

- India A won the toss and elected to field.
- No play was possible on day 2 due to rain and wet outfield.

=== 3rd Unofficial Test ===
30 November - 3 December 2018
Scorecard

India A	v	New Zealand A
323 (89 overs); Vijay Shankar 71 (98); Doug Bracewell 5/78 (22 overs)		398 (131.4 overs); Cam Fletcher 103 (221); Krishnappa Gowtham 6/139 (46.4 overs)
38/1 (14 overs); Ravikumar Samarth 27* (41); Doug Bracewell 1/17 (6 overs)

Match Drawn
Cobham Oval, Whangārei
Umpires: Shaun Haig (NZ) and Wayne Knights (NZ)

- India A won the toss and elected to bat.

== List-A series ==
=== 1st Unofficial ODI ===
7 December 2018
14:00 (D/N)
Scorecard

New Zealand A 308/6 (50 overs)	v	India A 311/6 (49 overs)
James Neesham 79* (48); Siddarth Kaul 2/74 (10 overs)		Vijay Shankar 87* (80); Hamish Bennett 2/65 (10 overs)

India A won by 4 wickets
Bay Oval, Mount Maunganui
Umpires: Chris Brown (NZ) and Shaun Haig (NZ)

- India A won the toss and elected to field

=== 2nd Unofficial ODI ===
9 December 2018
14:00 (D/N)
Scorecard

New Zealand A 299/9 (50 overs)	v	India A 300/5 (49 overs)
Will Young 102 (106); Khaleel Ahmed 2/65 (9 overs)		Manish Pandey 111* (109); Cole McConchie 2/39 (6 overs)

India A won by 5 wickets
Bay Oval, Mount Maunganui
Umpires: Shaun Haig (NZ) and Wayne Knights (NZ)

- India A won the toss and elected to field

=== 3rd Unofficial ODI ===
11 December 2018
14:00 (D/N)
Scorecard

India A 275/8 (50 overs)	v	New Zealand A 200 (44.2 overs)
Anmolpreet Singh 71 (80); Seth Rance 3/49 (7 overs)		Tim Seifert 55 (73); Siddarth Kaul 4/37 (7 overs)

India A won by 75 runs
Bay Oval, Mount Maunganui
Umpires: Wayne Knights (NZ) and Chris Brown (NZ)

- India A won the toss and elected to bat.
