= Australian cricket team in New Zealand in 2020–21 =

International cricket tour

	New Zealand	Australia
- Dates: 22 February – 7 March 2021
Captains	Kane Williamson	Aaron Finch

Twenty20 International series
- Results: New Zealand won the 5-match series 3–2
Most runs	Martin Guptill (218)	Aaron Finch (197)
Most wickets	Ish Sodhi (13)	Ashton Agar (8)
- Player of the series: Ish Sodhi (NZ)

The Australia cricket team toured New Zealand in February and March 2021 to play five Twenty20 International (T20I) matches. In August 2020, New Zealand Cricket confirmed that the tour was going ahead, and were working with their government to comply with biosecurity during the COVID-19 pandemic. On 29 September 2020, New Zealand Cricket confirmed the schedule against Australia. Originally, the tour was scheduled to be a three match series, but was increased to five matches. The last three T20I matches took place on the same day as the New Zealand women's fixtures at the same venues.

On 27 February 2021, the third T20I match was moved from Eden Park in Auckland to the Wellington Regional Stadium after Auckland went into lockdown due to the COVID-19 pandemic. The remaining matches were scheduled to be played behind closed doors. However, crowds were allowed to attend the last T20I after restrictions were relaxed.

On 1 March 2021, the final T20I was also moved from the Bay Oval in Tauranga to the Wellington Regional Stadium, after logistical complications arose from the movement of the fourth T20I. New Zealand won the first two T20Is, with Australia winning the next two matches to level the series. New Zealand won the fifth and final T20I by seven wickets, winning the series 3–2.

== Squads ==
T20Is
New Zealand	Australia
Kane Williamson (c); Hamish Bennett; Trent Boult; Mark Chapman; Devon Conway; Martin Guptill; Kyle Jamieson; Adam Milne; James Neesham; Glenn Phillips; Mitchell Santner; Tim Seifert (wk); Ish Sodhi; Tim Southee	Aaron Finch (c); Matthew Wade (vc, wk); Ashton Agar; Jason Behrendorff; Mitchell Marsh; Glenn Maxwell; Ben McDermott; Riley Meredith; Josh Philippe; Jhye Richardson; Kane Richardson; Daniel Sams; Tanveer Sangha; D'Arcy Short; Marcus Stoinis; Ashton Turner; Andrew Tye; Adam Zampa

Despite being injured, Martin Guptill was included in New Zealand's squad, with Finn Allen named as his standby. Ahead of the third T20I, Adam Milne was added to New Zealand's squad as cover, after Mitchell Santner was ruled out due to illness.

== T20I series ==
=== 1st T20I ===
22 February 2021
19:10 (N)
Scorecard

New Zealand; 184/5 (20 overs)	v	Australia; 131 (17.3 overs)
Devon Conway 99* (59); Jhye Richardson 2/31 (4 overs)		Mitchell Marsh 45 (33); Ish Sodhi 4/28 (4 overs)

New Zealand won by 53 runs
Hagley Oval, Christchurch
Umpires: Chris Brown (NZ) and Chris Gaffaney (NZ)
Player of the match: Devon Conway (NZ)

- Australia won the toss and elected to field.
- Josh Philippe (Aus) made his T20I debut.

=== 2nd T20I ===
25 February 2021
14:00
Scorecard

New Zealand; 219/7 (20 overs)	v	Australia; 215/8 (20 overs)
Martin Guptill 97 (50); Kane Richardson 3/43 (4 overs)		Marcus Stoinis 78 (37); Mitchell Santner 4/31 (4 overs)

New Zealand won by 4 runs
University of Otago Oval, Dunedin
Umpires: Chris Gaffaney (NZ) and Shaun Haig (NZ)
Player of the match: Martin Guptill (NZ)

- Australia won the toss and elected to field.
- This was the first T20I match to be played at this venue.
- Mitchell Santner (NZ) played in his 50th T20I.

=== 3rd T20I ===
3 March 2021
19:00 (N)
Scorecard

Australia; 208/4 (20 overs)	v	New Zealand; 144 (17.1 overs)
Glenn Maxwell 70 (31); Ish Sodhi 2/32 (4 overs)		Martin Guptill 43 (28); Ashton Agar 6/30 (4 overs)

Australia won by 64 runs
Wellington Regional Stadium, Wellington
Umpires: Chris Gaffaney (NZ) and Wayne Knights (NZ)
Player of the match: Ashton Agar (Aus)

- New Zealand won the toss and elected to field.
- Riley Meredith (Aus) made his T20I debut.
- Ashton Agar took the best figures for a bowler for Australia, and the fifth-best figures overall in T20Is.

=== 4th T20I ===
5 March 2021
19:00 (N)
Scorecard

Australia; 156/6 (20 overs)	v	New Zealand; 106 (18.5 overs)
Aaron Finch 79* (55); Ish Sodhi 3/32 (4 overs)		Kyle Jamieson 30 (18); Kane Richardson 3/19 (2.5 overs)

Australia won by 50 runs
Wellington Regional Stadium, Wellington
Umpires: Chris Brown (NZ) and Wayne Knights (NZ)
Player of the match: Aaron Finch (Aus)

- Australia won the toss and elected to bat.

=== 5th T20I ===
7 March 2021
12:00
Scorecard

Australia; 142/8 (20 overs)	v	New Zealand; 143/3 (15.3 overs)
Matthew Wade 44 (29); Ish Sodhi 3/24 (4 overs)		Martin Guptill 71 (46); Riley Meredith 2/39 (4 overs)

New Zealand won by 7 wickets
Wellington Regional Stadium, Wellington
Umpires: Chris Gaffaney (NZ) and Wayne Knights (NZ)
Player of the match: Martin Guptill (NZ)

- Australia won the toss and elected to bat.
