= Pakistani cricket team in New Zealand in 2023–24 =

International cricket tour

Pakistan cricket team in New Zealand in 2023–24
	New Zealand	Pakistan
- Dates: 12 – 21 January 2024
Captains	Kane Williamson (Note: Mitchell Santner captained New Zealand in the last three T20Is.)	Shaheen Afridi

Twenty20 International series
- Results: New Zealand won the 5-match series 4–1
Most runs	Finn Allen (275)	Babar Azam (213)
Most wickets	Tim Southee (10)	Shaheen Afridi (9)
- Player of the series: Finn Allen (NZ)

The Pakistan cricket team toured New Zealand in January 2024 to play five Twenty20 International (T20I) matches. The series formed part of both teams' preparation for the 2024 ICC Men's T20 World Cup tournament.

== Squads ==
New Zealand	Pakistan
Kane Williamson (c); Finn Allen; Mark Chapman; ~~Josh Clarkson~~; Devon Conway (wk); Lockie Ferguson; Matt Henry; Adam Milne; Daryl Mitchell; Glenn Phillips; Rachin Ravindra; Mitchell Santner; Ben Sears; Tim Seifert (wk); Ish Sodhi; Tim Southee; Will Young	Shaheen Afridi (c); Mohammad Rizwan (vc, wk); Abrar Ahmed; Iftikhar Ahmed; Abbas Afridi; Saim Ayub; Babar Azam; Sahibzada Farhan; Aamir Jamal; Azam Khan (wk); Haseebullah Khan (wk); Zaman Khan; Usama Mir; Mohammad Nawaz; Haris Rauf; Mohammad Wasim Jr.; Fakhar Zaman

Ben Sears was named in the New Zealand's squad for the first two T20Is, with Lockie Ferguson replacing him for the last three T20Is.

Mitchell Santner was named New Zealand's captain for the third T20I, with Kane Williamson rested for that match to manage his workload. Josh Clarkson was named as Williamson's replacement. However, on 13 January 2024, Clarkson was ruled out with a shoulder injury and replaced by Will Young. On 16 January 2024, Williamson was further ruled out of the last two T20Is due to a minor hamstring strain, with Young replacing him in the New Zealand's squad for those matches.

For the last T20I, Rachin Ravindra replaced Daryl Mitchell in the New Zealand's squad.

On 9 January 2024, Mohammad Rizwan was appointed as vice-captain of Pakistan in T20Is.

== T20I series ==
=== 1st T20I ===
12 January 2024
19:10 (N)
Scorecard

New Zealand; 226/8 (20 overs)	v	Pakistan; 180 (17 overs)
Daryl Mitchell 61 (27); Abbas Afridi 3/34 (4 overs)		Babar Azam 57 (35); Tim Southee 4/25 (4 overs)

New Zealand won by 46 runs
Eden Park, Auckland
Umpires: Chris Brown (NZ) and Shaun Haig (NZ)
Player of the match: Daryl Mitchell (NZ)

- Pakistan won the toss and elected to field.
- Abbas Afridi and Usama Mir (Pak) both made their T20I debuts.
- Shaheen Afridi captained Pakistan for the first time in T20Is.
- Tim Southee (NZ) became the first cricketer to take 150 wickets in T20Is.

=== 2nd T20I ===
14 January 2024
19:10 (N)
Scorecard

New Zealand; 194/8 (20 overs)	v	Pakistan; 173 (19.3 overs)
Finn Allen 74 (41); Haris Rauf 3/38 (4 overs)		Babar Azam 66 (43); Adam Milne 4/33 (4 overs)

New Zealand won by 21 runs
Seddon Park, Hamilton
Umpires: Kim Cotton (NZ) and Wayne Knights (NZ)
Player of the match: Finn Allen (NZ)

- Pakistan won the toss and elected to field.

=== 3rd T20I ===
17 January 2024
13:00
Scorecard

New Zealand; 224/7 (20 overs)	v	Pakistan; 179/7 (20 overs)
Finn Allen 137 (62); Haris Rauf 2/60 (4 overs)		Babar Azam 58 (37); Tim Southee 2/29 (4 overs)

New Zealand won by 45 runs
University of Otago Oval, Dunedin
Umpires: Chris Brown (NZ) and Shaun Haig (NZ)
Player of the match: Finn Allen (NZ)

- Pakistan won the toss and elected to field.
- Finn Allen (NZ) became the joint-most six hitter in a T20I innings (16).
- Finn Allen recorded highest individual score by a male New Zealand cricketer in T20Is (137).

=== 4th T20I ===
19 January 2024
19:10 (N)
Scorecard

Pakistan; 158/5 (20 overs)	v	New Zealand; 159/3 (18.1 overs)
Mohammad Rizwan 90* (63); Matt Henry 2/22 (4 overs)		Daryl Mitchell 72* (44); Shaheen Afridi 3/34 (4 overs)

New Zealand won by 7 wickets
Hagley Oval, Christchurch
Umpires: Shaun Haig (NZ) and Wayne Knights (NZ)
Player of the match: Daryl Mitchell (NZ)

- New Zealand won the toss and elected to field.

=== 5th T20I ===
21 January 2024
13:00
Scorecard

Pakistan; 134/8 (20 overs)	v	New Zealand; 92 (17.2 overs)
Mohammad Rizwan 38 (38); Tim Southee 2/19 (4 overs)		Glenn Phillips 26 (22); Iftikhar Ahmed 3/24 (4 overs)

Pakistan won by 42 runs
Hagley Oval, Christchurch
Umpires: Chris Brown (NZ) and Wayne Knights (NZ)
Player of the match: Iftikhar Ahmed (Pak)

- Pakistan won the toss and elected to bat.
- Haseebullah Khan (Pak) made his T20I debut.
- This was lowest total any team successfully defended in T20Is in New Zealand.
