= New Zealand cricket team in Ireland in 2022 =

International cricket tour

	Ireland	New Zealand
- Dates: 10 – 22 July 2022
Captains	Andrew Balbirnie	Tom Latham (ODIs); Mitchell Santner (T20Is)

One Day International series
- Results: New Zealand won the 3-match series 3–0
Most runs	Harry Tector (225)	Michael Bracewell (190)
Most wickets	Curtis Campher (5)	Matt Henry (7)
- Player of the series: Michael Bracewell (NZ)

Twenty20 International series
- Results: New Zealand won the 3-match series 3–0
Most runs	Mark Adair (89)	Glenn Phillips (148)
Most wickets	Josh Little (8)	Ish Sodhi (6)
- Player of the series: Glenn Phillips (NZ)

The New Zealand cricket team toured Ireland in July 2022 to play three One Day International (ODI) and three Twenty20 International (T20I) matches. The ODI series formed part of the inaugural 2020–2023 ICC Cricket World Cup Super League.

In the first ODI, Ireland's Harry Tector and New Zealand's Michael Bracewell both scored centuries. Bracewell's 127 not out helped New Zealand to win the match by one wicket with one ball remaining. New Zealand won the second ODI by three wickets to win the series with a match to play. New Zealand won the third and final ODI by one run to win the series 3–0.

New Zealand won the first T20I by 31 runs, with Glenn Phillips scoring an unbeaten 69 runs. New Zealand also won the second T20I, by the margin of 88 runs, with Dane Cleaver scoring 78 not out and Michael Bracewell taking a hat-trick. New Zealand won the third T20I by six wickets, to also win the T20I series 3–0.

== Background ==
Originally, the New Zealand cricket team were scheduled to tour Ireland in June and July 2020, along with a tour Scotland to play an ODI and T20I match. Initially, Cricket Ireland announced that Bready Cricket Club Ground would not be hosting any matches at the venue due to their financial position. However, when Cricket Ireland confirmed the fixtures in December 2019, the T20I matches were confirmed to be taking place at the ground.

The COVID-19 pandemic put the tour in doubt. In April 2020, David White, Chief Executive of New Zealand Cricket, said that the tour would be "most unlikely" to happen. Later the same month, Cricket Ireland's Chief Executive, Warren Deutrom, stated that international cricket in Ireland during 2020 was at "high risk" due to the pandemic. Deutrom later added that New Zealand's tour to Ireland was "fairly doubtful". However, the tour was postponed on 15 May 2020 due to the pandemic.

== Squads ==
ODIs		T20Is	
Ireland	New Zealand	Ireland	New Zealand
Andrew Balbirnie (c); Mark Adair; Curtis Campher; Gareth Delany; George Dockrell; Stephen Doheny; Graham Hume; Josh Little; Andy McBrine; Simi Singh; Paul Stirling; Harry Tector; Lorcan Tucker; Craig Young	Tom Latham (c, wk); Finn Allen; Michael Bracewell; Dane Cleaver (wk); Jacob Duffy; Lockie Ferguson; Martin Guptill; Matt Henry; Adam Milne; Henry Nicholls; Glenn Phillips; Mitchell Santner; Ish Sodhi; Blair Tickner; Will Young	Andrew Balbirnie (c); Mark Adair; Curtis Campher; Gareth Delany; George Dockrell; Stephen Doheny; Fionn Hand; Josh Little; Andy McBrine; Barry McCarthy; ~~Conor Olphert~~; Paul Stirling; Harry Tector; Lorcan Tucker; Craig Young	Mitchell Santner (c); Finn Allen; Michael Bracewell; Mark Chapman; Dane Cleaver (wk); Jacob Duffy; Lockie Ferguson; Martin Guptill; ~~Adam Milne~~; Daryl Mitchell; James Neesham; Glenn Phillips; Michael Rippon; Ben Sears; Ish Sodhi; Blair Tickner

Adam Milne was ruled out of New Zealand's T20I squad due to an Achilles injury with Jacob Duffy named as his replacement. Ireland's Conor Olphert was ruled out of the T20I series with a knee injury, with Fionn Hand named as his replacement.

== ODI series ==
=== 1st ODI ===
10 July 2022
10:45
Scorecard

Ireland; 300/9 (50 overs)	v	New Zealand; 305/9 (49.5 overs)
Harry Tector 113 (117); Lockie Ferguson 2/44 (10 overs)		Michael Bracewell 127* (82); Curtis Campher 3/49 (10 overs)

New Zealand won by 1 wicket
Malahide Cricket Ground, Dublin
Umpires: Roland Black (Ire) and Aleem Dar (Pak)
Player of the match: Michael Bracewell (NZ)

- New Zealand won the toss and elected to field.
- Finn Allen and Glenn Phillips (NZ) both made their ODI debuts.
- Harry Tector (Ire) scored his first century in ODIs.
- Michael Bracewell (NZ) scored his first century in ODIs.
- World Cup Super League points: New Zealand 10, Ireland 0.

=== 2nd ODI ===
12 July 2022
10:45
Scorecard

Ireland; 216 (48 overs)	v	New Zealand; 219/7 (38.1 overs)
George Dockrell 74 (61); Michael Bracewell 2/26 (10 overs)		Finn Allen 60 (58); Mark Adair 2/29 (5 overs)

New Zealand won by 3 wickets
Malahide Cricket Ground, Dublin
Umpires: Aleem Dar (Pak) and Paul Reynolds (Ire)
Player of the match: Michael Bracewell (NZ)

- New Zealand won the toss and elected to field.
- Jacob Duffy (NZ) made his ODI debut.
- World Cup Super League points: New Zealand 10, Ireland 0.

=== 3rd ODI ===
15 July 2022
10:45
Scorecard

New Zealand; 360/6 (50 overs)	v	Ireland; 359/9 (50 overs)
Martin Guptill 115 (126); Josh Little 2/84 (10 overs)		Paul Stirling 120 (103); Matt Henry 4/68 (10 overs)

New Zealand won by 1 run
Malahide Cricket Ground, Dublin
Umpires: Roland Black (Ire) and Aleem Dar (Pak)
Player of the match: Martin Guptill (NZ)

- New Zealand won the toss and elected to bat.
- Graham Hume (Ire) made his ODI debut.
- World Cup Super League points: New Zealand 10, Ireland 0.

== T20I series ==
=== 1st T20I ===
18 July 2022
16:00
Scorecard

New Zealand; 173/8 (20 overs)	v	Ireland; 142 (18.2 overs)
Glenn Phillips 69* (52); Josh Little 4/35 (4 overs)		Curtis Campher 29 (21); Lockie Ferguson 4/14 (3.2 overs)

New Zealand won by 31 runs
Stormont Cricket Ground, Belfast
Umpires: Roland Black (Ire) and Paul Reynolds (Ire)
Player of the match: Glenn Phillips (NZ)

- Ireland won the toss and elected to field.
- Michael Bracewell and Dane Cleaver (NZ) both made their T20I debuts.

=== 2nd T20I ===
20 July 2022
16:00
Scorecard

New Zealand; 179/4 (20 overs)	v	Ireland; 91 (13.5 overs)
Dane Cleaver 78* (55); Josh Little 2/31 (4 overs)		Mark Adair 27 (22); Michael Bracewell 3/5 (0.5 overs)

New Zealand won by 88 runs
Stormont Cricket Ground, Belfast
Umpires: Paul Reynolds (Ire) and Alex Wharf (Eng)
Player of the match: Dane Cleaver (NZ)

- Ireland won the toss and elected to field.
- Michael Bracewell (NZ) took his first hat-trick in T20Is.

=== 3rd T20I ===
22 July 2022
16:00
Scorecard

Ireland; 174/6 (20 overs)	v	New Zealand; 180/4 (19 overs)
Paul Stirling 40 (29); Ish Sodhi 2/27 (4 overs)		Glenn Phillips 56* (44); Josh Little 2/33 (4 overs)

New Zealand won by 6 wickets
Stormont Cricket Ground, Belfast
Umpires: Roland Black (Ire) and Alex Wharf (Eng)
Player of the match: Glenn Phillips (NZ)

- Ireland won the toss and elected to bat.
