= Tynemouth Cricket Club =

Cricket club in England

Tynemouth Cricket Club, formed in 1847, play in the North East Premier League and have done so since their inception in 2000.

== History ==
Tynemouth Cricket Club has a youth system leading into the senior level with senior teams always in contention for division titles.

The Cricket Club's chairman is Andrew Lineham. The current senior teams captains are: first XI - D. McGee, second XI - M. Turner, Saturday third XI - M. Pollard. The current senior team captain for the Sunday third XI remains to be determined.

== Ground ==
Tynemouth CC play at Preston Avenue, Tynemouth

== Famous former players ==
- Gordon Muchall, Durham and England
- Nicky Peng, Durham and England
- Scott Borthwick, Durham and England
- Mark Wood, Durham and England
- Mike Jones, Durham and Scotland
- Richard Coughtrie, Durham and England
- Graeme Hallam, Northumberland 100 caps and oldest player ever to play cricket
