= Michael Jones (cricketer) =

Scottish cricketer

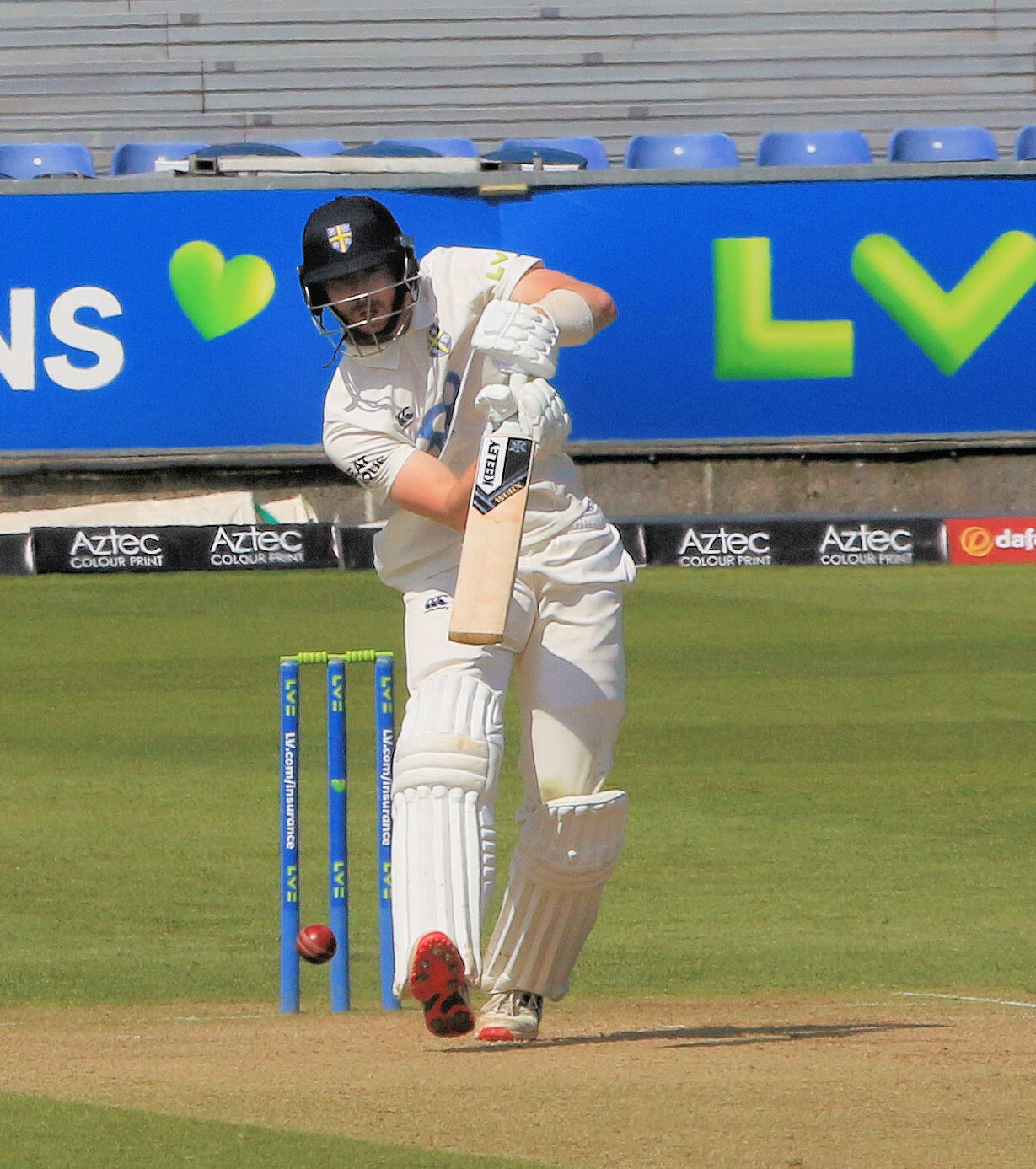
- Jones batting for Durham in 2023

Personal information
- Full name: Michael Alexander Jones
- Born: 5 January 1998 (age 28); Ormskirk, Lancashire, England
- Batting: Right-handed
- Bowling: Right-arm off break
- Role: Batsman

International information
- National side: Scotland
- ODI debut (cap 64): 16 January 2018 v Ireland
- Last ODI: 13 August 2026 v Canada
- T20I debut (cap 60): 29 July 2022 v New Zealand
- Last T20I: 17 February 2026 v Nepal

Domestic team information
- Years: Team
- 2018–2024: Durham (squad no. 10)
- 2024–2025: Desert Vipers
- 2024: Northern Superchargers
- 2025–2026: Lancashire (squad no. 44)

Career statistics
Competition	ODI	T20I	FC	LA
Matches	19	15	57	43
Runs scored	506	366	2,838	1,230
Batting average	29.76	26.14	31.53	31.53
100s/50s	0/3	0/2	3/17	2/6
Top score	87	86	206	119
Catches/stumpings	4/–	10/–	30/–	15/–
- Source: Cricinfo, 27 September 2026

Michael Alexander Jones (born 5 January 1998) is a Scottish cricketer. He made his One Day International (ODI) debut for Scotland against Ireland in the 2017–18 United Arab Emirates Tri-Nation Series, and was Scotland's top scorer in the match with 87 runs in a six-wicket defeat.

== Early life ==
Jones was born in Ormskirk, Lancashire, England. He qualified to play for Scotland via his mother, who was born in Aberdeen.

Jones was educated at Ormskirk School and Myerscough College. A product of the Lancashire Academy, he played club cricket for Ormskirk Cricket Club in the Liverpool and District Cricket Competition. During 2017, he featured in county 2nd XI matches for Durham, Derbyshire and Leicestershire.

== Domestic and franchise cricket ==
Jones signed a senior academy contract with Durham ahead of the 2018 season and also played for Tynemouth Cricket Club.

During the 2017–2018 Australian summer, Jones played for the Torquay Tigers Cricket Club, making 573 runs at an average of 71.62, including three 100s and three 50s.

He made his first-class debut for Durham against Derbyshire on 9 June 2018 in the 2018 County Championship.

In July 2019, he was selected to play for the Glasgow Giants in the inaugural edition of the Euro T20 Slam cricket tournament; however, the tournament was cancelled the following month.

In April 2022, in the 2022 County Championship, Jones scored his maiden century in first-class cricket, with 108 runs against Leicestershire. He made his Twenty20 debut on 26 May 2022, for Durham in the 2022 T20 Blast. In July 2022, also in the County Championship, Jones scored his maiden double century in first-class cricket, with 206 runs against Middlesex.

Jones joined Lancashire on a three-year contract ahead of the 2025 season.

== International career ==
In October 2021, Jones was named as a reserve player in Scotland's Twenty20 International (T20I) squad for the 2021 ICC Men's T20 World Cup. Following an injury to Josh Davey, Jones was added to Scotland's main squad for their last three matches of the tournament.

In July 2022, Jones was named in Scotland's T20I squad for their home series against New Zealand. Jones made his T20I debut on 29 July 2022, for Scotland against New Zealand.

In May 2024, he was named in Scotland’s squad for the 2024 ICC Men's T20 World Cup tournament.
