= Bangladeshi cricket team in New Zealand in 2009–10 =

Bangladeshi cricket team in New Zealand in 2009-10
	Bangladesh	New Zealand
- Dates: 3 February – 19 February 2010
Captains	Shakib Al Hasan	DL Vettori

Test series
- Result: New Zealand won the 1-match series 1–0
Most runs	Shakib Al Hasan (187)	Martin Guptill (245)
Most wickets	Rubel Hossain (5)	Daniel Vettori (5)

One Day International series
- Results: New Zealand won the 3-match series 3–0
Most runs	Imrul Kayes (143)	LRPL Taylor (132)
Most wickets	Shafiul Islam (7)	DL Vettori (6)

Twenty20 International series
- Results: New Zealand won the 1-match series 1–0
Most runs	Raqibul Hasan (18)	BB McCullum (56)
Most wickets		DL Vettori (3)
- Player of the series: DL Vettori

The Bangladesh cricket team was touring New Zealand for a single Test match, a three-match ODI series, and one Twenty20 International from 3 to 19 February 2010. This was 'The National Bank' Series.

New Zealand started the series with a ten wicket victory in the Twenty20 International, dismissing Bangladesh for 78, the second lowest score by a full member of the International Cricket Council (ICC).

New Zealand registered a clean sweep by winning the ODI series 3-0 and the Test series 1–0.

== Squads ==
New Zealand
Batsmen: Ross Taylor; Martin Guptill; Neil Broom; Peter Ingram; All-rounders: Daniel Vettori (c); Jacob Oram; Nathan McCullum	Wicket-keepers: Brendon McCullum; Gareth Hopkins; Bowlers: Ian Butler; James Franklin; Andy McKay; Tim Southee; Daryl Tuffey

Bangladesh
Batsmen: Aftab Ahmed; Imrul Kayes; Mohammad Ashraful; Tamim Iqbal; Junaid Siddique; Raqibul Hasan; Naeem Islam; All-rounders: Shakib Al Hasan (c); Mahmudullah	Wicket-keepers: Mushfiqur Rahim; Bowlers: Mashrafe Mortaza; Nazmul Hossain; Abdur Razzak; Shahadat Hossain; Shafiul Islam; Rubel Hossain

== T20I series ==
=== Only T20I ===
3 February 2010
Scorecard

Bangladesh; 78 (17.3 overs)	v	New Zealand; 79/0 (8.2 overs)
Raqibul Hasan 18 (13); DL Vettori 3/6 (4 overs)		BB McCullum 56 (27)

New Zealand won by 10 wickets
Seddon Park, Hamilton
Umpires: GAV Baxter (NZ) and CB Gaffaney (NZ)
Player of the match: DL Vettori (NZ)

- Bangladesh won the toss and elected to bat.

== ODI series ==
=== 1st ODI ===
5 February 2010
Scorecard

New Zealand; 336/9 (50 overs)	v	Bangladesh; 190 (43.5 overs)
JDP Oram 83 (40); Shafiul Islam 4/68 (10 overs)		Tamim Iqbal 62 (69); DL Vettori 3/33 (10 overs)

New Zealand won by 146 runs
McLean Park, Napier
Umpires: RA Kettleborough (Eng) and EA Watkin (NZ)
Player of the match: JDP Oram (NZ)

- New Zealand won the toss and elected to bat.

=== 2nd ODI ===
8 February 2010
Scorecard

Bangladesh; 183/8 (50 overs)	v	New Zealand; 185/5 (27.3 overs)
Mushfiqur Rahim 86 (107); IG Butler 3/43 (10 overs)		Ross Taylor 78 (52); Shafiul Islam 3/49 (7 overs)

New Zealand won by 5 wickets
University Oval, Dunedin
Umpires: AL Hill (NZ) and RA Kettleborough (Eng)
Player of the match: LRPL Taylor (NZ)

- New Zealand won the toss and elected to field.

=== 3rd ODI ===
11 February 2010
Scorecard

Bangladesh; 241/9 (50 overs)	v	New Zealand; 244/7 (44.5 overs)
Imrul Kayes 101 (138); TG Southee 3/37 (10 overs)		MJ Guptill 91 (91); Shakib Al Hasan 4/33 (10 overs)

New Zealand won by 3 wickets
AMI Stadium, Christchurch
Umpires: GAV Baxter (NZ) and RA Kettleborough (Eng)
Player of the match: MJ Guptill (NZ)

- New Zealand won the toss and elected to field.

== Test series ==
=== Only Test ===
15–19 February
Scorecard

New Zealand	v	Bangladesh
553/7d (135 overs); MJ Guptill 189 (444); R Hossain 5/166 (29 overs)		408 (97.3 overs); Mahmudullah 115 (190); DL Vettori 3/88 (28.3 overs)
258/5d (71.0 overs); TG McIntosh 89 (164); Mahmudullah 2/84 (19 overs)		282 (76.0 overs); Shakib Al Hasan 100 (129); TG Southee 3/41 (11 overs)

New Zealand won by 121 runs
Seddon Park, Hamilton
Umpires: RE Koertzen (SA) and RJ Tucker (Aus)
Player of the match: MJ Guptill (NZ)

- Bangladesh won the toss and elected to field.
- Peter Ingram (NZ) made his Test debut.

== Media coverage ==
=== Television ===
- SET Max (repeat) - India (The Next Day After The Match) ...1am to 8.30am
- Sky Sport (Live) - New Zealand
- Bangladesh Television (live) - Bangladesh
- Sky Sports (live) - United Kingdom
- DirecTV (live) - United States of America
- Supersport (live) – South Africa, Kenya and Zimbabwe
- Arab Digital Distribution (live) - United Arab Emirates
