= New Zealand cricket team in England in 2022 =

International cricket tour

	England	New Zealand
- Dates: 2 – 27 June 2022
Captains	Ben Stokes	Kane Williamson (Note: Tom Latham captained New Zealand for the second Test.)

Test series
- Result: England won the 3-match series 3–0
Most runs	Joe Root (396)	Daryl Mitchell (538)
Most wickets	Matty Potts (14)	Trent Boult (16)
- Player of the series: Joe Root (Eng), Daryl Mitchell (NZ)

The New Zealand cricket team toured England in June 2022 to play three Test matches, with the matches forming part of the 2021–2023 ICC World Test Championship. England also played three One Day International (ODI) matches against the Netherlands in Amstelveen between the second and third Tests.

In November 2021, the England and Wales Cricket Board (ECB) announced that Yorkshire County Cricket Club had been suspended from hosting international matches, following the racism experienced by Azeem Rafiq. Headingley was originally named as the venue for the third Test. In January 2022, the ECB set Yorkshire the deadline of spring 2022 to meet certain conditions to regain their international status for the match, with the suspension being lifted the following month.

In April 2022, following England's tour of the West Indies, Joe Root resigned as England's Test captain. Later the same month, the ECB named Ben Stokes as Root's successor. New Zealand named an extended squad of twenty players for the tour, with it being reduced to 15 for the opening Test match.

England won the first Test match by five wickets, with Joe Root scoring his 26th century and his 10,000th Test run in the process. It was England's first win in a Test after winning just one match in their previous 17 matches. In the second Test, New Zealand made 553 runs batting first, their highest innings score in England, with England making 539 in their first innings. England were set a target of 299 runs to win the match, with Jonny Bairstow hitting a 77-ball century, helping England to a five-wicket victory. England won the third Test match by seven wickets, chasing down their target of 113 runs in just 15.2 overs on the fifth and final day, to win the series 3–0. With the victory in the third match, England became the first team to chase a target of more than 250 runs to win in three successive Test matches.

== Squads ==
Tests
England	New Zealand
Ben Stokes (c); James Anderson; Jonny Bairstow (wk); Sam Billings (wk); Stuart Broad; Harry Brook; Zak Crawley; Ben Foakes (wk); Jack Leach; Alex Lees; Craig Overton; Jamie Overton; Matt Parkinson; Matty Potts; Ollie Pope; Joe Root	Kane Williamson (c); Tom Blundell (wk); Trent Boult; Michael Bracewell; Dane Cleaver; Devon Conway; Colin de Grandhomme; Cam Fletcher; Matt Henry; Kyle Jamieson; Tom Latham; Daryl Mitchell; Henry Nicholls; Ajaz Patel; Hamish Rutherford; Tim Southee; Blair Tickner; Neil Wagner; Will Young

On 30 May 2022, New Zealand named their squad for the first Test, with Jacob Duffy, Rachin Ravindra, Hamish Rutherford and Blair Tickner all being released from their initial squad of twenty players. Colin de Grandhomme suffered a foot injury during the first Test match, and was later ruled out of New Zealand's squad for the rest of the series. Ahead of the second Test, Kane Williamson was ruled out of the match after testing positive for COVID-19. As a result, Tom Latham was named New Zealand's captain for the match, with Hamish Rutherford being added to their squad. Kyle Jamieson suffered a back injury during the second Test, which ruled him out of New Zealand's squad for the third and final Test match. Blair Tickner was named as Jamieson's replacement. Cam Fletcher was also ruled out of New Zealand's squad for the third Test, due to a hamstring injury, with Dane Cleaver named as his replacement.

Ahead of the third Test, England added Jamie Overton to their squad. Prior to the start of the fourth day of the third Test, Sam Billings was added to England's squad as a COVID-19 substitute, after Ben Foakes returned a positive COVID-19 test the previous evening. Billings took the field at the start of day four, keeping wicket.

== Tour matches ==
20–23 May 2022
Scorecard

New Zealand	v	Sussex
342/3d (90 overs); Tom Latham 65* (125); Delray Rawlins 2/63 (17 overs)		247 (79.1 overs); Ali Orr 59 (122); Jacob Duffy 2/17 (12 overs)
40/0 (8 overs); Will Young 20* (20)

Match drawn
County Cricket Ground, Hove
Umpires: Paul Baldwin (Eng) and Graham Lloyd (Eng)

- New Zealand won the toss and elected to bat.
- No play was possible on days 1 and 4 due to rain.

26–29 May 2022
Scorecard

New Zealand	v	First Class Counties XI
362/9d (100 overs); Matt Henry 65 (67); Liam Patterson-White 3/60 (18 overs)		247 (74.2 overs); Lyndon James 52 (109); Ajaz Patel 3/32 (16 overs)
148 (43.2 overs); Kyle Jamieson 36 (64); Jamie Porter 5/31 (10 overs)		264/3 (88 overs); Ben Compton 119 (262); Ajaz Patel 2/55 (20 overs)

First Class Counties XI won by 7 wickets
County Cricket Ground, Chelmsford
Umpires: Ben Debenham (Eng) and Rob White (Eng)

- New Zealand won the toss and elected to bat.

== Test series ==
=== 1st Test ===
2–6 June 2022 (Note: While five days of play were scheduled for each Test, the first Test reached a result in four days.)
Scorecard

New Zealand	v	England
132 (40 overs); Colin de Grandhomme 42* (50); Matthew Potts 4/13 (9.2 overs)		141 (42.5 overs); Zak Crawley 43 (56); Tim Southee 4/55 (14 overs)
285 (91.3 overs); Daryl Mitchell 108 (203); Matthew Potts 3/55 (20 overs)		279/5 (78.5 overs); Joe Root 115* (170); Kyle Jamieson 4/79 (25 overs)

England won by 5 wickets
Lord's, London
Umpires: Michael Gough (Eng) and Rod Tucker (Aus)
Player of the match: Joe Root (Eng)

- New Zealand won the toss and elected to bat.
- Matt Parkinson and Matthew Potts (Eng) both made their Test debuts.
- Matt Parkinson replaced Jack Leach as a concussion substitute for England.
- Joe Root (Eng) scored his 10,000th run in Tests.
- Joe Root also scored his first ever 4th innings century.
- World Test Championship points: England 12, New Zealand 0.

=== 2nd Test ===
10–14 June 2022
Scorecard

New Zealand	v	England
553 (145.3 overs); Daryl Mitchell 190 (318); James Anderson 3/62 (27 overs)		539 (128.2 overs); Joe Root 176 (211); Trent Boult 5/106 (33.3 overs)
284 (84.4 overs); Daryl Mitchell 62* (131); Stuart Broad 3/70 (20 overs)		299/5 (50 overs); Jonny Bairstow 136 (92); Trent Boult 3/94 (16 overs)

England won by 5 wickets
Trent Bridge, Nottingham
Umpires: Michael Gough (Eng) and Paul Reiffel (Aus)
Player of the match: Jonny Bairstow (Eng)

- England won the toss and elected to field.
- Michael Bracewell (NZ) made his Test debut.
- Trent Boult (NZ) took his 10th five-wicket haul in Tests.
- James Anderson (Eng) took his 650th wicket in Tests.
- 249 boundaries were struck in the match (225 fours and 24 sixes), the most in any Test match.
- World Test Championship points: England 10, New Zealand 0. (Note: England were deducted two WTC points for a slow over-rate while bowling.)

=== 3rd Test ===
23–27 June 2022
Scorecard

New Zealand	v	England
329 (117.3 overs); Daryl Mitchell 109 (228); Jack Leach 5/100 (38.3 overs)		360 (67 overs); Jonny Bairstow 162 (157); Trent Boult 4/104 (22 overs)
326 (105.2 overs); Tom Blundell 88* (161); Jack Leach 5/66 (32.2 overs)		296/3 (54.2 overs); Joe Root 86* (125); Tim Southee 1/68 (19 overs)

England won by 7 wickets
Headingley, Leeds
Umpires: Marais Erasmus (SA) and Richard Kettleborough (Eng)
Player of the match: Jack Leach (Eng)

- New Zealand won the toss and elected to bat.
- No play was possible before lunch on day 5 due to rain.
- Jamie Overton (Eng) made his Test debut.
- Sam Billings replaced Ben Foakes as a COVID-19 substitute for England.
- Ben Stokes (Eng) scored his 100th six in Tests.
- Jonny Bairstow (Eng) scored his 5,000th run and his tenth century in Tests.
- Jack Leach took his first ten-wicket haul in Tests.
- World Test Championship points: England 12, New Zealand 0.
