= Dane Cleaver =

New Zealand cricketer

Personal information
- Full name: Dane Cleaver
- Born: 1 January 1992 (age 34); Palmerston North, New Zealand
- Batting: Right-handed
- Bowling: Right-arm leg break
- Role: Wicket-keeper-batter
- Relatives: Kane Williamson (cousin)

International information
- National side: New Zealand (2022–present)
- Only ODI (cap 206): 31 July 2022 v Scotland
- ODI shirt no.: 15
- T20I debut (cap 93): 18 July 2022 v Ireland
- Last T20I: 2 May 2026 v Bangladesh
- T20I shirt no.: 15

Domestic team information
- Years: Team
- 2010/11–present: Central Districts (squad no. 2)

Career statistics
Competition	ODI	T20I	FC	LA
Matches	1	13	99	104
Runs scored	32	222	5,948	2,459
Batting average	32.00	22.20	41.59	28.26
100s/50s	0/0	0/2	10/38	2/14
Top score	32	78*	201	124*
Catches/stumpings	2/0	9/2	307/18	132/12
- Source: Cricinfo, 2 May 2026

Dane Cleaver (born 1 January 1992) is a New Zealand cricketer who plays for Central Districts. He made his international debut for the New Zealand cricket team in July 2022. He is the cousin of New Zealand captain Kane Williamson.

== Career ==
=== Central Districts ===
On 21 March 2011, Cleaver made his first-class debut for Central Districts in a rain-affected draw, where only 8.2 overs were possible in the match. He made his List A debut the following season.

In June 2018, he was awarded a contract with Central Districts for the 2018–19 season. In February 2020, in the 2019–20 Plunket Shield season, Cleaver scored a double century in the first innings and made nine dismissals.

In March 2022, Cleaver was named captain of the Central Districts cricket team for their Plunket Shield match against Northern Districts in Napier, Hawke's Bay at McLean Park.

=== New Zealand A ===
In November 2020, Cleaver was named in the New Zealand A cricket team for practice matches against the touring West Indies team.

=== New Zealand ===
In March 2022, Cleaver was named in New Zealand's Twenty20 International (T20I) squad for their home series against the Netherlands.

In June 2022, Cleaver was added to New Zealand's Test squad, for their third and final match against England, but did not play.

Later that same month, he was named in New Zealand's One Day International (ODI) and T20I squads for their tours of Ireland, Scotland and the Netherlands. Cleaver made his T20I debut on 18 July 2022, for New Zealand against Ireland, and in the second match of the series he hit a match-winning 78 not out.

Cleaver made his ODI debut on 31 July 2022, for New Zealand against Scotland.
