= 2017–18 Trans-Tasman Tri-Series =

Cricket tournament

- Logo of the 2017–18 Trans-Tasman Tri-Series
- Date: 2–21 February 2018
- Location: Australia and New Zealand
- Result: Australia won the tri-series
- Player of the series: Glenn Maxwell (Aus)
Teams
Australia	England	New Zealand
Captains
David Warner	Eoin Morgan (Note: Jos Buttler captained England in the 3rd and 4th T20Is as Eoin Morgan was injured.)	Kane Williamson
Most runs
Glenn Maxwell (233)	Dawid Malan (172)	Martin Guptill (258)
Most wickets
Andrew Tye (10)	Adil Rashid (4); David Willey (4)	Trent Boult (8)

The 2017–18 Trans-Tasman Tri-Series was a Twenty20 International (T20I) cricket tournament that was held in Australia and New Zealand in February 2018. It was a tri-nation series between Australia, England and New Zealand. It followed on from England's tour of Australia, which included the 2017–18 Ashes series, and took the place of the planned Chappell–Hadlee Trophy series. It was the first T20I tri-series contested by full ICC members.

Australia qualified for the final after winning their first three matches. They were joined in the final by New Zealand, who despite losing to England in their final group match, qualified on net run rate. Australia won the final against New Zealand, beating them by 19 runs by the Duckworth–Lewis–Stern method, after a rain-affected match.

== Squads ==
Australia	New Zealand	England
David Warner (c); Ashton Agar; Alex Carey (wk); Ben Dwarshuis; Aaron Finch; Travis Head; Chris Lynn; Glenn Maxwell; Kane Richardson; D'Arcy Short; Billy Stanlake; Marcus Stoinis; Andrew Tye; Adam Zampa	Kane Williamson (c); Tom Blundell; Trent Boult; Tom Bruce; Mark Chapman; Colin de Grandhomme; Martin Guptill; Anaru Kitchen; Colin Munro; Henry Nicholls; Seth Rance; Mitchell Santner; Ish Sodhi; Tim Southee; Tim Seifert; Ross Taylor; Ben Wheeler	Eoin Morgan (c); Jake Ball; Sam Billings; Jos Buttler (wk); Sam Curran; Tom Curran; Liam Dawson; Alex Hales; Chris Jordan; Dawid Malan; Liam Plunkett; Adil Rashid; ~~Joe Root~~; Jason Roy; ~~Ben Stokes~~; James Vince; David Willey; Mark Wood

Joe Root was named in England's initial squad, but was withdrawn before the tournament started to allow him a break from playing. Ben Stokes confirmed he would not join the England squad until after his court appearance on 13 February 2018. Stokes was charged with affray on 15 January 2018, in relation to an incident in September 2017. He pled not guilty at the court appearance and though he joined up with the squad before England's final game he did not play in the tri-series. Sam Curran and Jake Ball were both added to England's initial squad before the series started. Australia's Aaron Finch was ruled out of the first T20I due to a hamstring injury. Tom Bruce and Tom Blundell were replaced by Mark Chapman and Tim Seifert respectively in New Zealand's squad before their first match against England. Henry Nicholls was added to New Zealand's squad as cover for Kane Williamson who was suffering with a back injury. Ahead of 6th T20I Liam Plunkett was ruled out of England's squad for rest of the series.

== Tour match ==
=== 20-over: Prime Minister's XI v England XI ===
2 February 2018
19:15 (D/N)
Scorecard

Prime Minister's XI (Australia); 136/8 (20 overs)	v	England XI; 139/2 (12.4 overs)
Peter Handscomb 43 (29); Liam Dawson 3/16 (4 overs)		David Willey 79 (36); Mitchell Swepson 2/33 (3.4 overs)

England XI won by 8 wickets
Manuka Oval, Canberra
Umpires: Donovan Koch (Aus) and David Shepard (Aus)
Player of the match: David Willey (Eng XI)

- England XI won the toss and elected to field.

== Points table ==
Pos	Team	Pld	W	L	T	NR	BP	Pts	NRR
1	Australia	4	4	0	0	0	0	8	1.719
2	New Zealand	4	1	3	0	0	0	2	−0.556
3	England	4	1	3	0	0	0	2	−1.036

Source: Cricinfo

== Fixtures ==
=== 1st match ===
3 February 2018
19:20 (N)
Scorecard

New Zealand; 117/9 (20 overs)	v	Australia; 96/3 (11.3 overs)
Colin de Grandhomme 38* (24); Andrew Tye 4/23 (4 overs)		Chris Lynn 44 (33); Trent Boult 2/14 (3 overs)

Australia won by 7 wickets (DLS method)
Sydney Cricket Ground, Sydney
Umpires: Chris Brown (NZ) and Simon Fry (Aus)
Player of the match: Billy Stanlake (Aus)

- Australia won the toss and elected to field.
- Rain set Australia a revised target of 95 runs from 15 overs.
- Alex Carey and D'Arcy Short (Aus) both made their T20I debuts.
- Points: Australia 2, New Zealand 0.

=== 2nd match ===
7 February 2018
19:40 (N)
Scorecard

England; 155/9 (20 overs)	v	Australia; 161/5 (18.3 overs)
Dawid Malan 50 (36); Glenn Maxwell 3/10 (2 overs)		Glenn Maxwell 103* (58); David Willey 3/28 (3 overs)

Australia won by 5 wickets
Bellerive Oval, Hobart
Umpires: Gerard Abood (Aus) and Simon Fry (Aus)
Player of the match: Glenn Maxwell (Aus)

- Australia won the toss and elected to field.
- Glenn Maxwell (Aus) scored his second century in T20Is.
- Points: Australia 2, England 0.

=== 3rd match ===
10 February 2018
19:20 (N)
Scorecard

England; 137/7 (20 overs)	v	Australia; 138/3 (14.3 overs)
Jos Buttler 46 (49); Kane Richardson 3/33 (4 overs)		Glenn Maxwell 39 (26); Chris Jordan 2/26 (3 overs)

Australia won by 7 wickets
Melbourne Cricket Ground, Melbourne
Umpires: Chris Brown (NZ) and Sam Nogajski (Aus)
Player of the match: Kane Richardson (Aus)

- Australia won the toss and elected to field.
- Jos Buttler captained England as Eoin Morgan was injured.
- Australia qualified for the final as a result of this match.
- Points: Australia 2, England 0.

=== 4th match ===
13 February 2018
19:00 (N)
Scorecard

New Zealand; 196/5 (20 overs)	v	England; 184/9 (20 overs)
Kane Williamson 72 (46); Adil Rashid 2/36 (4 overs)		Dawid Malan 59 (40); Mitchell Santner 2/29 (4 overs)

New Zealand won by 12 runs
Wellington Regional Stadium, Wellington
Umpires: Shaun Haig (NZ) and Wayne Knights (NZ)
Player of the match: Kane Williamson (NZ)

- England won the toss and elected to field.
- Tim Seifert (NZ) made his T20I debut.
- Mark Chapman made his international debut for New Zealand after playing for Hong Kong in international cricket.
- Jos Buttler captained England as Eoin Morgan was injured.
- Points: New Zealand 2, England 0.

=== 5th match ===
16 February 2018
19:00 (N)
Scorecard

New Zealand; 243/6 (20 overs)	v	Australia; 245/5 (18.5 overs)
Martin Guptill 105 (54); Kane Richardson 2/40 (4 overs)		D'Arcy Short 76 (44); Ish Sodhi 1/35 (4 overs)

Australia won by 5 wickets
Eden Park, Auckland
Umpires: Shaun Haig (NZ) and Paul Wilson (Aus)
Player of the match: D'Arcy Short (Aus)

- New Zealand won the toss and elected to bat.
- Martin Guptill (NZ) scored his second century in T20Is and became the leading run-scorer in T20Is (2188).
- Australia made the highest successful run-chase in T20Is.
- 32 sixes were hit in the match, equalling the record for T20Is.
- Points: Australia 2, New Zealand 0.

=== 6th match ===
18 February 2018
19:00 (N)
Scorecard

England; 194/7 (20 overs)	v	New Zealand; 192/4 (20 overs)
Eoin Morgan 80* (46); Trent Boult 3/50 (4 overs)		Martin Guptill 62 (47); Adil Rashid 1/22 (4 overs)

England won by 2 runs
Seddon Park, Hamilton
Umpires: Chris Brown (NZ) and Paul Wilson (Aus)
Player of the match: Eoin Morgan (Eng)

- New Zealand won the toss and elected to field.
- Points: England 2, New Zealand 0.
- This was England's 100 T20I.

== Final ==
21 February 2018
19:00 (N)
Scorecard

New Zealand; 150/9 (20 overs)	v	Australia; 121/3 (14.4 overs)
Ross Taylor 43* (38); Ashton Agar 3/27 (4 overs)		D'Arcy Short 50 (30); Colin Munro 1/18 (2 overs)

Australia won by 19 runs (DLS method)
Eden Park, Auckland
Umpires: Chris Brown (NZ) and Wayne Knights (NZ)
Player of the match: Ashton Agar (Aus)

- New Zealand won the toss and elected to bat.
- Rain during Australia's innings prevented any further play.
- This was Australia's 100th T20I.
