= Finn Allen =

New Zealand cricketer (born 1999)

Personal information
- Full name: Finnley Hugh Allen
- Born: 22 April 1999 (age 27); Auckland, New Zealand
- Batting: Right-handed
- Bowling: Right-arm off break
- Role: Top-order batter

International information
- National side: New Zealand (2021–present)
- ODI debut (cap 203): 10 July 2022 v Ireland
- Last ODI: 15 November 2026 v India
- ODI shirt no.: 16
- T20I debut (cap 87): 28 March 2021 v Bangladesh
- Last T20I: 1 November 2026 v India
- T20I shirt no.: 16

Domestic team information
- Years: Team
- 2016/17–2019/20, 2023/24–present: Auckland
- 2020/21–2022/23: Wellington
- 2021: Lancashire
- 2021: Birmingham Phoenix
- 2022: Yorkshire
- 2023-present: San Francisco Unicorns
- 2023: Southern Brave
- 2024/25–present: Perth Scorchers
- 2025: Quetta Gladiators
- 2026–present: Kolkata Knight Riders
- 2026: Trent Rockets
- 2026: Glasgow Cosmic

Career statistics
Competition	ODI	T20I	FC	LA
Matches	24	67	20	67
Runs scored	624	1,797	671	2,025
Batting average	27.13	28.52	20.96	30.68
100s/50s	0/5	3/7	0/4	3/10
Top score	96	137	79	168
Balls bowled	–	–	18	162
Wickets	–	–	1	1
Bowling average	–	–	15.00	157.00
5 wickets in innings	–	–	0	0
10 wickets in match	–	–	0	0
Best bowling	–	–	1/15	1/32
Catches/stumpings	12/–	24/–	19/–	38/–
Medal record
Men's Cricket
Representing NZ
ICC T20 World Cup
Runner-up	2026 India & Sri Lanka
- Source: Cricinfo, 15 November 2026

Finnley Hugh Allen (born 22 April 1999) is a cricketer who plays for the New Zealand in the White-ball formats of this game. He plays as a top order batter who can also keep wicket. He plays domestic cricket for Auckland, having previously played for Wellington, and has played in a variety of T20 franchise leagues.

== Domestic and franchise career ==
Allen made his Twenty20 debut for Auckland in the 2016–17 Super Smash on 3 January 2017. Prior to his Twenty20 debut, he was named in New Zealand's squad for the 2016 Under-19 Cricket World Cup.

Allen made his List A debut for Auckland in the 2017–18 Ford Trophy on 17 February 2018. He made his first-class debut for Auckland in the 2017–18 Plunket Shield season on 9 March 2018. In September 2018, he was named in the Auckland Aces' squad for the 2018 Abu Dhabi T20 Trophy. In November 2019, in a tour match for the New Zealand XI against England, Allen scored an unbeaten century.

In June 2020, Allen was offered a contract by Wellington ahead of the 2020–21 domestic cricket season, coming into his own as the tournament leading run-scorer (512, SR 194) as Wellington defended their Super Smash title. Opening partner Devon Conway (455) was second. In March 2021, he was signed by Royal Challengers Bangalore as Josh Philippe's replacement for the 2021 Indian Premier League, but did not play in any matches during the tournament.

In February 2022, Allen was bought by the Royal Challengers Bangalore in the auction for the 2022 Indian Premier League tournament, but once again missed out on the final Playing XI. In April 2022, he was signed by Yorkshire to play in the T20 Blast in England.

In August 2024, Allen signed a two-year deal with the Perth Scorchers in the Big Bash League ahead of the 2024–25 season. He started his stint poorly, with a string of single-figure scores, before finding form mid-tournament with a couple of hard-hitting fifties.

In June 2025 while playing for the San Francisco Unicorns of Major League Cricket, Allen hit a league-record 151 runs of 52 balls against the Washington Freedom, also breaking the MLC record for fastest century and a world T20 record for most sixes with 19.

In the mini-auction held in December 2025 for the 2026 Indian Premier League, Allen was bought by the Kolkata Knight Riders (KKR) for ₹2 crore. He finally made the Playing XI, debuting on March 29, 2026 against the Mumbai Indians (MI). He had a solid but mixed campaign, getting off to an explosive start but going through a string of low scores and being benched at the mid-point of the season. Allen returned to the Knight Riders' Playing XI in the second half of the tournament and was back in form, scoring an unbeaten 47-ball century against the Delhi Capitals (DC) and a 35-ball 93 against the Gujarat Titans (GT). He capped off his maiden IPL season for KKR with 349 runs from 11 matches (including 2 half-centuries and 1 century) at an average of 34.90 and a blistering strike rate of 214.11.

== International career ==
In December 2017, Allen was named in New Zealand's squad for the 2018 Under-19 Cricket World Cup. He scored the first century of the tournament, with 115 not out against the West Indies on the opening day of the competition. In New Zealand's second game of the tournament, against Kenya, Allen scored a half-century off just 19 balls, the joint-second quickest in Under 19 ODI history. He was the leading run-scorer for New Zealand in the tournament, with 338 runs.

In March 2021, Allen was named in New Zealand's Twenty20 International (T20I) squad for their series against Bangladesh. He made his T20I debut for New Zealand on 28 March 2021, against Bangladesh, scoring 71 in 29 balls in his 3rd game, opening with Martin Guptill. In August 2021, Allen was named in New Zealand's One Day International (ODI) squad for their tour of Pakistan.

In June 2022, Allen was named in New Zealand's ODI squads for their tours of Ireland and Scotland. He made his ODI debut on 10 July 2022, for New Zealand against Ireland. On 27 July, in New Zealand's first match against Scotland, Allen scored his first century in T20I cricket.

In January 2024, Allen scored 137 from 62 balls against Pakistan to surpass Brendon McCullum's New Zealand T20I record. With 16 sixes, Allen also drew level with Afghan Hazratullah Zazai to become the joint record holder for the most sixes scored by one player in an innings He was declared player of the match and player of the series for his efforts.

In May 2024, he was named in New Zealand's squad for the 2024 ICC Men's T20 World Cup tournament.

In August 2024, Allen declined a New Zealand Cricket central contract in order to pursue international franchise opportunities.

In January 2026, Allen was named in New Zealand's 15 man squad for the 2026 ICC Men's T20 World Cup tournament. He scored the fastest century at a T20 World Cup against South Africa while chasing in semifinal with 100 not out in 33 balls.

In September 2026, Allen was named in New Zealand's 16 man squad for the 5 T20i series against India.
