= Mark Chapman (cricketer) =

New Zealand cricketer (born 1994)

Personal information
- Full name: Mark Sinclair Chapman
- Born: 27 June 1994 (age 32); British Hong Kong
- Batting: Left-handed
- Bowling: Slow left-arm orthodox
- Role: All-rounder

International information
- National sides: Hong Kong (2014–2016); New Zealand (2018–present)
- ODI debut (cap 32/194): 16 November 2015; Hong Kong v UAE
- Last ODI: 19 July 2026; New Zealand v West Indies
- T20I debut (cap 4/77): 16 March 2014; Hong Kong v Nepal
- Last T20I: 8 March 2026; New Zealand v India

Domestic team information
- Years: Team
- 2008–2016: Hong Kong Cricket Club
- 2015/16–present: Auckland
- 2018: St Lucia Stars
- 2025: Manchester Originals
- 2025-present: Washington Freedom
- 2026: Belfast Wolves
- 2026/27–present: Adelaide Strikers

Career statistics
Competition	ODI	T20I	FC	LA
Matches	37	113	46	97
Runs scored	1,057	2,074	3,259	3,379
Batting average	36.44	25.92	45.26	42.77
100s/50s	3/5	1/10	7/17	8/19
Top score	132	104*	276	157
Balls bowled	–	84	366	611
Wickets	–	4	1	14
Bowling average	–	24.75	246.00	46.42
5 wickets in innings	–	0	0	0
10 wickets in match	–	0	0	0
Best bowling	–	1/9	1/60	3/41
Catches/stumpings	9/–	48/–	39/–	38/–
Medal record
Men's Cricket
Representing New Zealand
ICC T20 World Cup
Runner-up	2026 India & Sri Lanka
Runner-up	2021 UAE & Oman
ICC Champions Trophy
Runner-up	2025 Pakistan
- Source: Cricinfo, 21 July 2026

Mark Sinclair Chapman (born 27 June 1994) is a New Zealand international cricketer who has played limited over internationals for New Zealand and Hong Kong. He is a left-handed batsman who bowls occasional slow left-arm orthodox. He made his One Day International debut for Hong Kong against the United Arab Emirates in the 2015–17 ICC World Cricket League Championship on 16 November 2015. He is eligible to represent New Zealand through his father. In February 2018, he made his T20I and ODI debuts for New Zealand against England. In the MLC, he plays for Washington Freedom

== Early life and education ==
Chapman was born in Hong Kong to a New Zealander father and a Hong Kongese mother. His father Peter was a crown prosecutor for the Government of Hong Kong and his mother Anne worked in the financial sector. He attended Island School in Hong Kong, before enrolling at King's College, Auckland at the age of 14, and went on to study engineering at the University of Auckland.

== Domestic career ==
Chapman played for the Hong Kong under-19 team at the 2010 Under-19 World Cup, aged 15.

Chapman made his World Cricket League debut for Hong Kong in the 2011 Division Three tournament against USA at the age of 16. He top scored for Hong Kong with an unbeaten knock of 70 in the final of the 2011 ICC World Cricket League Division Three tournament, helping Hong Kong claim the title after defeating Papua New Guinea. It also helped Hong Kong to earn a promotion to 2011 World Cricket League Division Two. It was in the latter tournament that Chapman made his List A debut against Uganda. He played five further List A matches in the competition, the last of which was against Papua New Guinea. In his six matches in the competition, he scored 192 runs at a batting average of 38.40, with two half centuries and a high score of 81. His highest score came against the United Arab Emirates. He made his T20 debut against Italy on 15 November 2013 during the 2013 ICC World Twenty20 Qualifier.

Chapman made his first-class debut on 17 December 2015 in the 2015–16 Plunket Shield. As he holds dual citizenship with both New Zealand and Hong Kong, he is not considered as an overseas player.

On 1 January 2018, Chapman scored his first century in a Twenty20 match, batting for Auckland against Canterbury in the 2017–18 Super Smash.

Chapman was the leading run-scorer in the 2017–18 Ford Trophy, with 480 runs in eight matches for Auckland. In June 2018, he was awarded a contract with Auckland for the 2018–19 season. In March 2020, in round five of the 2019–20 Plunket Shield season, Chapman and Joe Carter scored centuries in both innings of the match. It was the first time that two batsmen had scored a century in each innings in the same match in the Plunket Shield.

In June 2020, Chapman was offered a contract by Auckland ahead of the 2020–21 domestic cricket season. In the match between Auckland and Otago during the 2020–21 Plunket Shield season, Auckland's Ben Lister became the first COVID-19 replacement in a cricket match as he replaced Chapman, who reported feeling unwell, inline with the updated International Cricket Council (ICC) playing conditions for a substitute due to COVID.

Chapman was part of the Washington Freedom squad during the 2025 Major League Cricket season, in which the team finished as runners-up.

== International career ==
He was named in Hong Kong squad for the 2014 ICC World Twenty20, which was also Hong Kong's first appearance in a major ICC tournament. He made his T20I debut for Hong Kong on 16 March 2014 in the 2014 ICC T20 World Cup Group A match against Nepal. He was also named in the Hong Kong squad for the men's cricket tournament at the 2014 Asian Games. He top scored for Hong Kong in the bronze medal match against Bangladesh with 38 runs off 31 balls and despite his efforts Hong Kong lost the match by 27 runs.

In November 2015, Chapman was selected as vice-captain on Hong Kong's squad for its two World Cricket League fixtures against the UAE, both of which held ODI status. On his ODI debut in the first match, he scored 124 not out from 116 balls, becoming the first Hong Kong player to score an ODI century. Chapman also became first player from associate nations to score a century on their ODI debut, and second to do so at a strike rate of greater than 100.00 after Desmond Haynes.

He was named as the vice-captain of Hong Kong team for the 2016 ICC World Twenty20 and 2016 Asia Cup Qualifier. In a match against Oman during the 2016 Asia Cup Qualifier, he was controversially mankaded by Aamir Kaleem. He also became the first batsman to be mankaded in a T20I match. He was not selected in the Hong Kong squad for the 2018 Cricket World Cup Qualifier tournament due to his commitments with the Auckland cricket team and instead developed ambitions to represent New Zealand in the future.

In February 2018, Chapman was added to New Zealand's T20I squad, for their Trans-Tasman tri-series against Australia and England. He made his T20I debut for New Zealand against England on 13 February 2018 and became the sixth cricketer to play T20Is for two international teams. Chapman was named to New Zealand's ODI squad as a cover for injured Kane Williamson. On 28 February 2018 against England, Chapman made his ODI debut for New Zealand. With that, he became the tenth cricketer to play ODIs for two international teams.

In August 2021, Champman was named in New Zealand's squad for the 2021 ICC Men's T20 World Cup.

Mark Chapman is the first player with 50+ scores for two countries in T20Is.

In April 2023, he was selected for the T20I series against Pakistan. In 5th T20I, he scored 104* and leveled the series by 2-2 becoming the top scorer of the series and grabbed man of the series.

In May 2024, he was named in New Zealand's squad for the 2024 ICC Men's T20 World Cup tournament.

== See also ==
- List of cricketers who have played for two international teams
