= James Neesham =

New Zealand cricketer (born 1990)

Personal information
- Full name: James Douglas Sheahan Neesham
- Born: 17 September 1990 (age 36); Auckland, New Zealand
- Nickname: Jimmy
- Batting: Left-handed
- Bowling: Right-arm medium-fast
- Role: Batting all-rounder

International information
- National side: New Zealand (2012–present)
- Test debut (cap 264): 14 February 2014 v India
- Last Test: 16 March 2017 v South Africa
- ODI debut (cap 178): 19 January 2013 v South Africa
- Last ODI: 1 November 2023 v South Africa
- ODI shirt no.: 50
- T20I debut (cap 59): 21 December 2012 v South Africa
- Last T20I: 25 March 2026 v South Africa
- T20I shirt no.: 50

Domestic team information
- Years: Team
- 2009–2011, 2023–present: Auckland (Note: Only teams that Neesham played for in more than one season are included in this list.)
- 2011–2018: Otago
- 2018–2022: Wellington
- 2022–2024: Pretoria Capitals
- 2024, 2026: Janakpur Bolts

Career statistics
Competition	Test	ODI	T20I	FC
Matches	12	76	105	69
Runs scored	709	1,495	1,105	3,374
Batting average	33.76	28.20	20.09	32.13
100s/50s	2/4	0/7	0/0	5/18
Top score	137*	97*	48*	147
Balls bowled	1,076	2,415	1,051	7,257
Wickets	14	70	64	125
Bowling average	48.21	35.52	25.17	33.40
5 wickets in innings	0	2	1	2
10 wickets in match	0	0	0	0
Best bowling	3/42	5/27	5/22	5/65
Catches/stumpings	12/–	27/–	50/–	71/–
Medal record
Men's Cricket
Representing New Zealand
ICC Cricket World Cup
Runner-up	2019 England and Wales
ICC T20 World Cup
Runner-up	2026 India & Sri Lanka
Runner-up	2021 UAE and Oman
- Source: ESPNcricinfo, 27 June 2026

James Douglas Sheahan Neesham (born 17 September 1990), better known as Jimmy Neesham, is a New Zealand international cricketer who plays for the national team. He also plays in various T20 leagues around the globe as an all-rounder. He was a member of the New Zealand squads that finished as runners-up at the 2019 Cricket World Cup and the 2021 T20 World Cup.

== Domestic and T20 franchise career ==
Neesham began his first-class career with Auckland, but a move to Otago ahead of the 2011–12 season worked well for him, as he made some important contributions in the 50-over format, making three 40-plus scores in seven innings, all of them coming at more than a run a ball, in his first season playing for the province. He was among the wickets too, taking a career-best 5 for 44 against Wellington and 4 for 23 against Canterbury. The rewards came soon, as he was included in the limited-overs squads for the tour to South Africa.

Neesham played in the Indian Premier League in 2014 for Delhi Daredevils and for Guyana Amazon Warriors in the 2014 Caribbean Premier League. He played English county cricket for Derbyshire in 2016, and in June 2017 he signed to play for Kent County Cricket Club in the 2017 NatWest t20 Blast, making his debut in Kent's opening match of the tournament in July.

In June 2018, Neesham was awarded a contract with Wellington for the 2018–19 season.

In June 2019, he was selected to play for the Edmonton Royals franchise team in the 2019 Global T20 Canada tournament.

In the 2020 IPL auction, he was bought by the Kings XI Punjab and in 2021 was bought by Mumbai Indians. In February 2022, he was bought by the Rajasthan Royals in the auction for the 2022 Indian Premier League tournament.

In 2024, He was signed by Janakpur Bolts for 2024 Nepal Premier League. In 2025, He was signed by Pokhara Avengers for 2025 Nepal Premier League.

Previously, he played for Fortune Barishal in the 11th season of the 2025 Bangladesh Premier League in 2025, where his team won the tournament title. He currently played in the 12th edition of the 2026 Bangladesh Premier League for the Rajshahi Warriors.

== International career ==
Neesham made his Test debut against India, scoring an unbeaten 137, the highest score on debut by a Test number 8 batsman. In June 2014, he made a century in his second test against the West Indies, becoming the first New Zealander to score centuries in his first two matches.

Neesham was named in New Zealand's 15 man squad for the 2017 ICC Champions Trophy. On 3 January 2019, in the first ODI against Sri Lanka, Neesham scored 34 runs in one over, including five sixes. This was the most runs scored in one over by a New Zealand batsman in an ODI match.

In April 2019, he was named in New Zealand's squad for the 2019 Cricket World Cup. On 1 June 2019, in New Zealand's first match of the World Cup, Neesham played in his 50th ODI. In New Zealand's match against Afghanistan, Neesham took his first five-wicket haul and his 50th wicket in ODIs. In the 2019 Cricket World Cup semi-final, Neesham took a catch to dismiss Dinesh Karthik off Matt Henry's bowling, the final wicket of the match. Before the World Cup Neesham revealed that he had considered retiring from international cricket 18 months prior due to poor form and injury problems but Heath Mills, the then CEO of the New Zealand Players Association, advised him to take a break from cricket for 3–4 weeks and to not retire.

In August 2021, Neesham was named in New Zealand's squad for the 2021 ICC Men's T20 World Cup.

In May 2024, he was named in New Zealand's squad for the 2024 ICC Men's T20 World Cup tournament.
