= Scotland at the Cricket World Cup =

The Scotland national cricket team represents Scotland in the game of cricket. In 1992 Scotland severed their ties with the Test and County Cricket Board and with English cricket, and gained associate membership of the International Cricket Council (ICC) in their own right in 1994. They competed in the ICC Trophy for the first time in 1997, finishing third and qualifying for the 1999 World Cup, where they lost all their games. They also qualified for the 2007 and 2015 World Cups.

== Cricket World Cup record ==
Cricket World Cup record								Qualification record				
Year	Round	Position	GP	W	L	T	NR	Pld	W	L	T	NR
(England) 1975	Not eligible (not an ICC member)							No qualifier held				
(England) 1979	Not eligible (not an ICC member)							Did not participate (not an ICC member)				
(England) 1983	Not eligible (not an ICC member)							Did not participate (not an ICC member)				
(India) (Pakistan) 1987	Not eligible (not an ICC member)							Did not participate (not an ICC member)				
(Australia) (New Zealand) 1992	Not eligible (not an ICC member)							Did not participate (not an ICC member)				
(India) (Pakistan) (Sri Lanka) 1996	Not eligible (not an ICC member at time of qualification)							Did not participate (not an ICC member)				
(England) 1999	Group stage	12/12	5	0	5	0	0	9	6	2	0	1
(South Africa) 2003	Did not qualify							10	7	3	0	0
(Cricket West Indies) 2007	Group stage	15/16	3	0	3	0	0	7	7	0	0	0
(India) (Sri Lanka) (Bangladesh) 2011	Did not qualify							10	5	5	0	0
(Australia) (New Zealand) 2015	Group stage	14/14	6	0	6	0	0	22	14	7	0	1
(England) (Wales) 2019	Did not qualify							21	12	5	1	3
(India) 2023	Did not qualify							43	29	12	0	2
(South Africa) (Zimbabwe) (Namibia) 2027	TBD							Ongoing*				
Total	Group Stage	3/13	14	0	14	0	0	122	80	34	1	7

=== World Cup Record (By Team) ===
Cricket World Cup matches (By team)
Total : 0 Wins – 0 Ties – 14 Losses – 14 games played
Against	Wins	Draws	Losses	Total
Afghanistan	0	0	1	1
Australia	0	0	3	3
Bangladesh	0	0	2	2
England	0	0	1	1
Netherlands	0	0	1	1
New Zealand	0	0	2	2
Pakistan	0	0	1	1
South Africa	0	0	1	1
Sri Lanka	0	0	1	1
West Indies	0	0	1	1
Source: Last Updated:16 March 2015

== Tournament results ==
=== 1999 World Cup ===
1999 was Scotland's first appearance at the Cricket World Cup, and their matches against Bangladesh and New Zealand were played in Scotland. Scotland were drawn in Group B with Australia, Bangladesh, New Zealand, Pakistan and West Indies. Scotland failed to win a single match, and were eliminated in the group stages.

Squad

- George Salmond (c)
- Alec Davies (wk)
- Mike Allingham
- Asim Butt
- James Brinkley
- Ian Philip
- Nick Dyer
- Gavin Hamilton
- John Blain
- Bruce Patterson
- Keith Sheridan
- Greig Williamson
- Mike Smith
- Ian Stanger
- Peter Steindl

Results

Pool stage (Pool B)						Super Six		Semifinal	Final	Overall Result
Opposition Result	Opposition Result	Opposition Result	Opposition Result	Opposition Result	Rank	Opposition Result	Rank	Opposition Result	Opposition Result	Overall Result
Australia; L by 6 wickets	Pakistan; L by 94 runs	Bangladesh; L by 22 runs	West Indies; L by 8 wickets	New Zealand; L by 6 wickets	6	Did not advance				Pool stage

Scorecards

Pool stage (Pool B)

16 May 1999
Scorecard

Scotland; 181/7 (50 overs)	v	Australia; 182/4 (44.5 overs)
Gavin Hamilton 34 (42); Shane Warne 3/39 (10 overs)		Mark Waugh 67 (114); Nick Dyer 2/43 (10 overs)

Australia won by 6 wickets
New Road, Worcester, England
Umpires: Steve Dunne (NZ) and Peter Willey (Eng)
Player of the match: Mark Waugh (Aus)

20 May 1999
Scorecard

Pakistan; 261/6 (50 overs)	v	Scotland; 167 (38.5 overs)
Yousuf Youhana 81* (119); Gavin Hamilton 2/36 (10 overs)		Gavin Hamilton 76 (111); Shoaib Akhtar 3/11 (6 overs)

Pakistan won by 94 runs
Riverside Ground, Chester-le-Street, England
Umpires: Doug Cowie (NZ) and Ian Robinson (Zim)
Player of the match: Yousuf Youhana (Pak)

24 May 1999
Scorecard

Bangladesh; 185/9 (50 overs)	v	Scotland; 163 (46.2 overs)
Minhajul Abedin 68* (116); John Blain 4/37 (10 overs)		Gavin Hamilton 63 (71); Hasibul Hossain 2/26 (8 overs)

Bangladesh won by 22 runs
Grange Cricket Club Ground, Edinburgh, Scotland
Umpires: KT Francis (SL) and Dave Orchard (SA)
Player of the match: Minhajul Abedin (Ban)

27 May 1999
Scorecard

Scotland; 68 (31.3 overs)	v	West Indies; 70/2 (10.1 overs)
Gavin Hamilton 24* (82); Courtney Walsh 3/7 (7 overs)		Shivnarine Chanderpaul 30* (30); John Blain 2/36 (5.1 overs)

West Indies won by 8 wickets
Grace Road, Leicester, England
Umpires: Javed Akhtar (Pak) and Ian Robinson (Zim)
Player of the match: Courtney Walsh (WI)

31 May 1999
Scorecard

Scotland; 121 (42.1 overs)	v	New Zealand; 123/4 (17.5 overs)
Ian Stanger 27 (58); Chris Harris 4/7 (3.1 overs)		Roger Twose 54* (49); John Blain 3/53 (7 overs)

New Zealand won by 6 wickets
Grange Cricket Club Ground, Edinburgh, Scotland
Umpires: Rudi Koertzen (SA) and Ian Robinson (Zim)
Player of the match: Geoff Allott (NZ)

=== 2007 World Cup ===
After failing to qualify for the 2003 World Cup, Scotland qualified for the 2007 tournament in the West Indies. Once again, Scotland failed to win any of their matches, and were again eliminated in the group stage.

Squad

- Craig Wright (c)
- Colin Smith (wk)
- John Blain
- Dougie Brown
- Navdeep Poonia
- Neil McCallum
- Majid Haq
- Dewald Nel
- Gavin Hamilton
- Fraser Watts
- Ryan Watson
- Paul Hoffmann
- Ross Lyons
- Glenn Rogers
- Dougie Lockhart

Results

Group stage (Group A)				Super 8		Semifinal	Final	Overall Result
Opposition Result	Opposition Result	Opposition Result	Rank	Opposition Result	Rank	Opposition Result	Opposition Result	Overall Result
Australia; L by 203 runs	South Africa; L by 7 wickets	Netherlands; L by 8 wickets	4	Did not advance				Group stage

Scorecards

Group stage (Group A)

14 March
Scorecard

Australia; 334/6 (50 overs)	v	Scotland; 131 (40.2 overs)
Ricky Ponting 113 (93); Majid Haq 2/49 (7 overs)		Colin Smith 51 (76); Glenn McGrath 3/14 (6 overs)

Australia won by 203 runs
Warner Park Stadium, Basseterre
Umpires: Steve Bucknor (WI) and Asoka de Silva (SL)
Player of the match: Ricky Ponting (Aus)

20 March
Scorecard

Scotland; 186/8 (50 overs)	v	South Africa; 188/3 (23.2 overs)
Dougie Brown 45 (64); Andrew Hall 3/48 (10 overs)		Graeme Smith 91 (65); Majid Haq 2/43 (6 overs)

South Africa won by 7 wickets
Warner Park Stadium, Basseterre
Umpires: Mark Benson (Eng) and Asoka de Silva (SL)
Player of the match: Graeme Smith (SA)

22 March
Scorecard

Scotland; 136 (34.1 overs)	v	Netherlands; 140/2 (23.5 overs)
Glenn Rogers 26 (30); Billy Stelling 3/12 (8 overs)		Ryan ten Doeschate 70* (68); John Blain 2/29 (5 overs)

Netherlands won by 8 wickets
Warner Park Stadium, Basseterre
Umpires: Asoka de Silva (SL) and Tony Hill (NZ)
Player of the match: Billy Stelling (Ned)

=== 2015 World Cup ===
After failing to qualify for the 2011 World Cup, Scotland managed to qualify for the 2015 tournament by winning the 2014 Cricket World Cup Qualifier. Scotland lost all of their group matches, and were eliminated.

Squad

- Preston Mommsen (c)
- Matthew Cross (wk)
- Kyle Coetzer
- Calum MacLeod
- Richie Berrington
- Josh Davey
- Michael Leask
- Robert Taylor
- Alasdair Evans
- Iain Wardlaw
- Freddie Coleman
- Hamish Gardiner
- Matt Machan
- Safyaan Sharif

Note: Majid Haq was sent home for breaking team's code of conduct.

Results

Pool stage (Pool A)							Quarterfinal	Semifinal	Final	Overall Result
Opposition Result	Opposition Result	Opposition Result	Opposition Result	Opposition Result	Opposition Result	Rank	Opposition Result	Opposition Result	Opposition Result	Overall Result
New Zealand; L by 3 wickets	England; L by 119 runs	Afghanistan; L by 1 wicket	Bangladesh; L by 6 wickets	Sri Lanka; L by 148 runs	Australia; L by 7 wicket	7	Did not advance			Pool stage

Scorecards

Pool stage (Pool A)

17 February
11:00 (NZDT)
Scorecard

Scotland; 142 (36.2 overs)	v	New Zealand; 146/7 (24.5 overs)
Matt Machan 56 (79); Daniel Vettori 3/24 (8.2 overs)		Kane Williamson 38 (45); Josh Davey 3/40 (7 overs)

New Zealand won by 3 wickets
University Oval, Dunedin
Attendance: 4,684
Umpires: Simon Fry (Aus) and Nigel Llong (Eng)
Player of the match: Trent Boult (NZ)

- New Zealand won the toss and elected to field.
- Four players were dismissed for golden ducks during Scotland's innings, the first such instance in World Cups. Five Scotland players were dismissed for ducks, the most in Scotland's history.

23 February
11:00 (NZDT)
Scorecard

England; 303/8 (50 overs)	v	Scotland; 184 (42.2 overs)
Moeen Ali 128 (107); Josh Davey 4/68 (10 overs)		Kyle Coetzer 71 (84); Steven Finn 3/26 (9 overs)

England won by 119 runs
Hagley Oval, Christchurch
Attendance: 12,388
Umpires: Sundaram Ravi (Ind) and Rod Tucker (Aus)
Player of the match: Moeen Ali (Eng)

- Scotland won the toss and elected to field.

26 February
11:00 (NZDT)
Scorecard

Scotland; 210 (50 overs)	v	Afghanistan; 211/9 (49.3 overs)
Matt Machan 31 (28); Shapoor Zadran 4/38 (10 overs)		Samiullah Shenwari 96 (147); Richie Berrington 4/40 (10 overs)

Afghanistan won by 1 wicket
University Oval, Dunedin
Attendance: 3,229
Umpires: Simon Fry (Aus) and Ruchira Palliyaguruge (SL)
Player of the match: Samiullah Shenwari (Afg)

- Afghanistan won the toss and elected to field.
- This was the first time Scotland scored over 200 in a World Cup match.
- Alasdair Evans and Majid Haq's ninth-wicket partnership of 62 was Scotland's best ninth-wicket partnership in ODIs.
- This was Afghanistan's first ever World Cup win.
- Scotland captain Preston Mommsen was fined 20% of his match fee, and the other Scotland players 10%, for a slow over rate.

5 March
11:00 (NZDT)
Scorecard

Scotland; 318/8 (50 overs)	v	Bangladesh; 322/4 (48.1 overs)
Kyle Coetzer 156 (134); Taskin Ahmed 3/43 (7 overs)		Tamim Iqbal 95 (100); Josh Davey 2/68 (10 overs)

Bangladesh won by 6 wickets
Saxton Oval, Nelson
Attendance: 3,491
Umpires: Simon Fry (Aus) and Bruce Oxenford (Aus)
Player of the match: Kyle Coetzer (Sco)

- Bangladesh won the toss and elected to field.
- This was the first time Scotland scored more than 300 in a World Cup match, and the first time ever that Scotland scored more than 300 against a Test-playing nation.
- Kyle Coetzer scored Scotland's maiden World Cup century and the highest score by an associate nation player in World Cups.
- This is Bangladesh's highest ODI run-chase and second highest run-chase in World Cup history.
- Scotland was eliminated from the World Cup as a result of this match.

11 March
14:30 (AEDT) (D/N)
Scorecard

Sri Lanka; 363/9 (50 overs)	v	Scotland; 215 (43.1 overs)
Kumar Sangakkara 124 (95); Josh Davey 3/63 (8 overs)		Freddie Coleman 70 (74); Nuwan Kulasekara 3/20 (7 overs)

Sri Lanka won by 148 runs
Bellerive Oval, Hobart
Attendance: 3,549
Umpires: Richard Illingworth (Eng) and Joel Wilson (WI)
Player of the match: Kumar Sangakkara (SL)

- Sri Lanka won the toss and elected to bat.
- Kumar Sangakkara hit a record fourth consecutive ODI century.
- Sangakkara has now taken 54 dismissals as a wicket keeper, the most by any player in World Cups.
- Angelo Mathews scored Sri Lanka's fastest World Cup fifty and their second fastest in all ODIs (20 balls).
- This is the highest score conceded by Scotland in an ODI.

14 March
14:30 (AEDT) (D/N)
Scorecard

Scotland; 130 (25.4 overs)	v	Australia; 133/3 (15.2 overs)
Matt Machan 40 (35); Mitchell Starc 4/14 (4.4 overs)		Michael Clarke 47 (47); Rob Taylor 1/29 (5 overs)

Australia won by 7 wickets
Bellerive Oval, Hobart
Attendance: 12,177
Umpires: Ian Gould (Eng) and Richard Illingworth (Eng)
Player of the match: Mitchell Starc (Aus)

- Australia won the toss and elected to field.

== Records and statistics ==
=== Team records ===
Highest innings totals

Score	Opponent	Venue	Season
318/8 (50 overs)	Bangladesh	Nelson	2015
215/10 (43.1 overs)	Sri Lanka	Hobart	2015
210/10 (50 overs)	Afghanistan	Dunedin	2015
186/8 (50 overs)	South Africa	Basseterre	2007
184/10 (42.2 overs)	England	Christchurch	2015
Last updated: 14 March 2015

Lowest completed innings

Score	Opponent	Venue	Season
68 (31.3 overs)	West Indies	Leicester	1999
121 (42.1 overs)	New Zealand	Edinburgh	1999
130 (25.4 overs)	Australia	Hobart	2015
131 (40.1 overs)	Australia	Basseterre	2007
136 (34.1 overs)	Netherlands	Basseterre	2007
(unfinished innings excluded from this list) Last updated: 14 March 2015

=== Most appearances ===
This list consists players with most number of matches at the Cricket World Cup. John Blain and Gavin Hamilton have played the most matches, having appeared in 8 World Cup games and Preston Mommsen captained the team in 6 matches — the highest by a Scottish captain.

Matches	Player	Period
8	John Blain	1999-2007
8	Gavin Hamilton	1999-2007
7	Majid Haq	2007-2015
6	7 players	
Last updated: 14 March 2015

=== Batting records ===
Most runs

Runs	Player	Mat	Inn	Avg	100s	50s	Period
253	Kyle Coetzer	6	6	42.16	1	1	2015–2015
228	Gavin Hamilton	8	8	32.57	—	2	1999–2007
186	Matt Machan	6	6	31.00	—	1	2015–2015
148	Preston Mommsen	6	6	24.66	—	1	2015–2015
139	Richie Berrington	6	6	23.16	—	1	2015–2015
Last updated: 14 March 2015

Highest individual innings

Score	Player	Opponent	Venue	Season
156	Kyle Coetzer	Bangladesh	Nelson	2015
76	Gavin Hamilton	Pakistan	Chester-le-Street	1999
71	Kyle Coetzer	England	Christchurch	2015
70	Freddie Coleman	Sri Lanka	Hobart	2015
63	Gavin Hamilton	Bangladesh	Edinburgh	1999
Last updated: 14 March 2015

Highest partnerships

Runs	Players	Opposition	Venue	Season
141 (4th wicket)	Preston Mommsen (39) & Kyle Coetzer (100)	v Bangladesh	Nelson	2015
118 (4th wicket)	Preston Mommsen (49) & Freddie Coleman (64)	v Sri Lanka	Hobart	2015
97 (5th wicket)	Matt Machan (47) & Richie Berrington (46)	v New Zealand	Dunedin	2015
78 (3rd wicket)	Matt Machan (35) & Kyle Coetzer (41)	v Bangladesh	Nelson	2015
62 (6th wicket)	Gavin Hamilton (31) & James Brinkley (23)	v Australia	Worcester	1999
Last updated: 14 March 2015

=== Bowling statistics ===
Most wickets

Wickets	Player	Matches	Avg.	Econ.	4W	5W	Period
15	Josh Davey	6	20.73	6.22	1	0	2015–2015
12	John Blain	8	25.00	5.98	1	0	1999–2007
7	Richie Berrington	6	18.85	5.69	1	0	2015–2015
7	Majid Haq	7	41.00	5.64	0	0	2007–2015
6	Alasdair Evans	4	35.83	5.37	0	0	2015–2015
6	Iain Wardlaw	23	51.66	7.12	0	0	2015–2015
Last updated: 14 March 2015

Best bowling figures

Bowling Figures	Overs	Player	Opponent	Venue	Season
4/37	10.0	John Blain	v Bangladesh	Edinburgh	1999
4/40	10.0	Richie Berrington	v Afghanistan	Dunedin	2015
4/68	10.0	Josh Davey	v England	Christchurch	2015
3/40	7.0	Josh Davey	v New Zealand	Dunedin	2015
3/53	7.0	John Blain	v New Zealand	Edinburgh	1999
Last updated: 14 March 2015

== See also ==
- Scotland national cricket team
- Cricket in Scotland
