= Scotland at the Men's T20 World Cup =

Tournament Performance

The Scotland national cricket team is one of the associate members of the International Cricket Council (ICC). They qualified for the inaugural T20 World Cup in 2007 after finishing second in the 2007 ICC WCL Division One. They have played in five editions since then, their best performance came in 2021 when they advanced into the Super 12s from the first round. They have an overall win–loss record of 7–13 from 22 matches.

== T20 World Cup record ==
Men's T20 World Cup record										Qualification record (Note: WCL Division One served as the qualifier for the 2007 edition.)				
Year	Round	Position	Pld	W	L	T	NR	Ab (Note: Abandoned matches are not counted in the official records.)	Cap	Pld	W	L	T	NR
(South Africa) 2007	Group stage	10/12	2	0	1	0	1	0	Ryan Watson	5	4	1	0	0
(England) 2009	Group stage	12/12	2	0	2	0	0	0	Gavin Hamilton	4	2	2	0	0
(Cricket West Indies) 2010	Did not qualify									3	0	3	0	0
(Sri Lanka) 2012	Did not qualify									9	5	4	0	0
(Bangladesh) 2014	Did not qualify									10	6	4	0	0
(India) 2016	First round	14/16	3	1	2	0	0	0	Preston Mommsen	8	5	2	0	1
(United Arab Emirates) (Oman) 2021	Super 12	12/16	8	3	5	0	0	0	Kyle Coetzer	8	5	3	0	0
(Australia) 2022	First round	14/16	3	1	2	0	0	0	Richie Berrington	Qualified automatically				
(United States) (Cricket West Indies) 2024	Group stage	9/20	4	2	1	0	1	0	Richie Berrington	6	6	0	0	0
(India) (Sri Lanka) 2026 (Note: Following the Bangladesh Cricket Board's refusal to play in India, Bangladesh were replaced by Scotland, the next highest ranked T20I team.)	Group stage	13/20	4	1	3	0	0	0	Richie Berrington	4	1	2	0	1
Total	0 Titles	7/10	26	8	16	0	2	0	—N/a	57	34	21	0	2

=== Record by opponents ===
Positive Record Neutral Record Negative Record

Opponent	M	W	L	T+W	T+L	NR	Ab	Win %	First played
Afghanistan	2	0	2	0	0	0	0	0.00	2016
Australia	1	0	1	0	0	0	0	0.00	2024
Bangladesh	1	1	0	0	0	0	0	100	2021
England	2	0	1	0	0	1	0	0.00	2024
Hong Kong	1	1	0	0	0	0	0	100	2016
India	2	0	1	0	0	1	0	0.00	2007
Ireland	1	0	1	0	0	0	0	0.00	2022
Italy	1	1	0	0	0	0	0	100	2026
Namibia	2	1	1	0	0	0	0	50.00	2021
Nepal	1	0	1	0	0	0	0	0.00	2026
New Zealand	2	0	2	0	0	0	0	0.00	2009
Oman	2	2	0	0	0	0	0	100	2021
Pakistan	2	0	2	0	0	0	0	0.00	2007
Papua New Guinea	1	1	0	0	0	0	0	100	2021
South Africa	1	0	1	0	0	0	0	0.00	2009
West Indies	2	1	1	0	0	0	0	50.00	2022
Zimbabwe	2	0	2	0	0	0	0	0.00	2016
Total	26	8	16	0	0	2	0	33.33	—
Source: Last Updated: 8 March 2026

== Tournament results ==
=== 2007 World Cup ===
Squad and kit

- Ryan Watson (c)
- John Blain
- Dougie Brown
- Gordon Drummond
- Gavin Hamilton
- Majid Haq
- Neil McCallum
- Ross Lyons
- Gregor Maiden
- Dewald Nel
- Navdeep Poonia
- Qasim Sheikh
- Colin Smith (wk)
- Fraser Watts
- Craig Wright

2007 kit

Results

Group stage (Group D)			Super 8s		Semifinal	Final	Overall Result
Opposition Result	Opposition Result	Rank	Opposition Result	Rank	Opposition Result	Opposition Result	Overall Result
Pakistan; Lost by 51 runs	India; No result	3	Did not advance				Group stage
Source: Cricinfo

Scorecards

Group stage (Group D)

12 September
14:00
(scorecard)

Pakistan; 171/9 (20 overs)	v	Scotland; 120 (19.5 overs)
Younis Khan 41 (29); Craig Wright 3/29 (4 overs)		Fraser Watts 46 (35); Shahid Afridi 4/19 (4 overs)

Pakistan won by 51 runs
Kingsmead, Durban
Umpires: Steve Davis (Aus) and Simon Taufel (Aus)
Player of the match: Shahid Afridi (Pak)

- Scotland won the toss and elected to field.
- This was Scotland's first-ever T20I match.

13 September
18:00
(scorecard)

India	v	Scotland

No Result
Kingsmead, Durban
Umpires: Steve Davis (Aus) and Simon Taufel (Aus)

- Scotland won the toss and elected to field.
- No play was possible due to rain.

=== 2009 World Cup ===
Squad and kit

- Gavin Hamilton (c)
- Kyle Coetzer
- Gordon Drummond
- Neil McCallum
- John Blain
- Navdeep Poonia
- Fraser Watts
- Majid Haq
- Dewald Nel
- Craig Wright
- Colin Smith (wk)
- Jan Stander
- Richie Berrington
- Glenn Rogers

2009 kit

Results

Group stage (Group D)			Super 8s		Semifinal	Final	Overall Result
Opposition Result	Opposition Result	Rank	Opposition Result	Rank	Opposition Result	Opposition Result	Overall Result
New Zealand; Lost by 7 wickets	South Africa; Lost by 130 runs	3	Did not advance				Group stage
Source: Cricinfo

Scorecards

Group stage (Group D)

6 June 2009
10:00
Scorecard

Scotland; 89/4 (7 overs)	v	New Zealand; 90/3 (6 overs)
Kyle Coetzer 33 (15); Ian Butler 3/19 (2 overs)		Jesse Ryder 31 (12); Ryan Watson 1/4 (1 overs)

New Zealand won by 7 wickets
The Oval, London
Umpires: Billy Doctrove (WI) and Daryl Harper (Aus)
Player of the match: Ian Butler (NZ)

- New Zealand won the toss and elected to field.
- Match reduced to 7 overs per side.

7 June 2009
13:30
Scorecard

South Africa; 211/5 (20 overs)	v	Scotland; 81 (15.3 overs)
AB de Villiers 79* (34); Majid Haq 2/25 (4 overs)		Kyle Coetzer 42 (32); Albie Morkel 2/15 (1.4 overs)

South Africa won by 130 runs
The Oval, London
Umpires: Asad Rauf (Pak) and Amiesh Saheba (Ind)
Player of the match: AB de Villiers (SA)

- Scotland won the toss and elected to field.
- Scotland were eliminated as a result of this match.

=== 2016 World Cup ===
Squad and kit

- Preston Mommsen (c)
- Kyle Coetzer
- Matthew Cross (wk)
- Richie Berrington
- Calum MacLeod
- George Munsey
- Matt Machan
- Michael Leask
- Josh Davey
- Safyaan Sharif
- Alasdair Evans
- Mark Watt
- Con de Lange
- Robert Taylor
- Gavin Main

Results

First round (Group B)				Super 10		Semifinal	Final	Overall Result
Opposition Result	Opposition Result	Opposition Result	Rank	Opposition Result	Rank	Opposition Result	Opposition Result	Overall Result
Afghanistan; Lost by 14 runs	Zimbabwe; Lost by 11 runs	Hong Kong; Won by 8 wickets (DLS)	3	Did not advance				First round
Source: Cricinfo

Scorecards

First round (Group B)

8 March
19:30 (D/N)
Scorecard

Afghanistan; 170/5 (20 overs)	v	Scotland; 156/5 (20 overs)
Mohammad Shahzad 61 (39); Alasdair Evans 1/24 (4 overs)		George Munsey 41 (29); Rashid Khan 2/28 (4 overs)

Afghanistan won by 14 runs
Vidarbha Cricket Association Stadium, Nagpur
Umpires: Marais Erasmus (SA) and Richard Illingworth (Eng)
Player of the match: Mohammad Shahzad (Afg)

- Afghanistan won the toss and elected to bat.

10 March
15:00 (D/N)
Scorecard

Zimbabwe; 147/7 (20 overs)	v	Scotland; 136 (19.4 overs)
Sean Williams 53 (36); Mark Watt 2/21 (4 overs)		Richie Berrington 36 (39); Wellington Masakadza 4/28 (4 overs)

Zimbabwe won by 11 runs
Vidarbha Cricket Association Stadium, Nagpur
Umpires: Aleem Dar (Pak) and Marais Erasmus (SA)
Player of the match: Wellington Masakadza (Zim)

- Zimbabwe won the toss and elected to bat.
- Scotland were eliminated as a result of this match.

12 March
19:30 (D/N)
Scorecard

Hong Kong; 127/7 (20 overs)	v	Scotland; 78/2 (8 overs)
Mark Chapman 40 (41); Matt Machan 2/26 (4 overs)		Matthew Cross 22 (14); Aizaz Khan 1/11 (1 over)

Scotland won by 8 wickets (DLS method)
Vidarbha Cricket Association Stadium, Nagpur
Umpires: Marais Erasmus (SA) and Ian Gould (Eng)
Player of the match: Matt Machan (Sco)

- Hong Kong won the toss and elected to bat.
- Rain reduced Scotland's innings to 10 overs with a target of 76 runs.
- This was Scotland's first victory in an ICC tournament.

=== 2021 World Cup ===
Squad and kit

- Kyle Coetzer (c)
- Matthew Cross (wk)
- Richard Berrington
- George Munsey
- Calum MacLeod
- Dylan Budge
- Michael Leask
- Safyaan Sharif
- Alasdair Evans
- Chris Greaves
- Mark Watt
- Hamza Tahir
- Brad Wheal
- Michael Jones
- Craig Wallace

Reserve players:

- Chris Sole

2021 kit

Results

First round (Group B)				Super 12 (Group 1)						Semifinal	Final	Overall Result
Opposition Result	Opposition Result	Opposition Result	Rank	Opposition Result	Opposition Result	Opposition Result	Opposition Result	Opposition Result	Rank	Opposition Result	Opposition Result	Overall Result
Bangladesh; Won by 6 runs	Papua New Guinea; Won by 17 runs	Oman; Won by 8 wickets	1	Afghanistan; Lost by 130 runs	Namibia; Lost by 4 wickets	New Zealand; Lost by 16 runs	India; Lost by 8 wickets	Pakistan; Lost by 72 runs	6	Did not advance		Super 12
Source: Cricinfo

Scorecards

First round (Group B)

17 October 2021
18:00 (N)
Scorecard

Scotland; 140/9 (20 overs)	v	Bangladesh; 134/7 (20 overs)
Chris Greaves 45 (28); Mahedi Hasan 3/19 (4 overs)		Mushfiqur Rahim 38 (36); Brad Wheal 3/24 (4 overs)

Scotland won by 6 runs
Oman Cricket Academy Ground Turf 1, Muscat
Umpires: Richard Kettleborough (Eng) and Ahsan Raza (Pak)
Player of the match: Chris Greaves (Sco)

- Bangladesh won the toss and elected to field.

19 October 2021
14:00
Scorecard

Scotland; 165/9 (20 overs)	v	Papua New Guinea; 148 (19.3 overs)
Richie Berrington 70 (49); Kabua Morea 4/31 (4 overs)		Norman Vanua 47 (37); Josh Davey 4/18 (3.3 overs)

Scotland won by 17 runs
Oman Cricket Academy Ground Turf 1, Muscat
Umpires: Kumar Dharmasena (SL) and Richard Kettleborough (Eng)
Player of the match: Richie Berrington (Sco)

- Scotland won the toss and elected to bat.

21 October 2021
18:00 (N)
Scorecard

Oman; 122 (20 overs)	v	Scotland; 123/2 (17 overs)
Aqib Ilyas 37 (35); Josh Davey 3/25 (4 overs)		Kyle Coetzer 41 (28); Fayyaz Butt 1/26 (3 overs)

Scotland won by 8 wickets
Oman Cricket Academy Ground Turf 1, Muscat
Umpires: Chris Gaffaney (NZ) and Ahsan Raza (Pak)
Player of the match: Josh Davey (Sco)

- Oman won the toss and elected to bat.
- Scotland qualified for the Super 12 stage of the tournament as a result of this match,

Super 12 (Group 2)

25 October 2021
18:00 (N)
Scorecard

Afghanistan; 190/4 (20 overs)	v	Scotland; 60 (10.2 overs)
Najibullah Zadran 59 (34); Safyaan Sharif 2/33 (4 overs)		George Munsey 25 (18); Mujeeb Ur Rahman 5/20 (4 overs)

Afghanistan won by 130 runs
Sharjah Cricket Stadium, Sharjah
Umpires: Kumar Dharmasena (SL) and Paul Wilson (Aus)
Player of the match: Mujeeb Ur Rahman (Afg)

- Afghanistan won the toss and elected to bat.

27 October 2021
18:00 (N)
Scorecard

Scotland; 109/8 (20 overs)	v	Namibia; 115/6 (19.1 overs)
Michael Leask 44 (27); Ruben Trumpelmann 3/17 (4 overs)		JJ Smit 32* (23); Michael Leask 2/12 (2 overs)

Namibia won by 4 wickets
Sheikh Zayed Cricket Stadium, Abu Dhabi
Umpires: Adrian Holdstock (SA) and Rod Tucker (Aus)
Player of the match: Ruben Trumpelmann (Nam)

- Namibia won the toss and elected to field.

3 November 2021
14:00
Scorecard

New Zealand; 172/5 (20 overs)	v	Scotland; 156/5 (20 overs)
Martin Guptill 93 (56); Safyaan Sharif 2/28 (4 overs)		Michael Leask 42* (20); Trent Boult 2/29 (4 overs)

New Zealand won by 16 runs
Dubai International Cricket Stadium, Dubai
Umpires: Marais Erasmus (SA) and Ahsan Raza (Pak)
Player of the match: Martin Guptill (NZ)

- Scotland won the toss and elected to field.

5 November 2021
18:00 (N)
Scorecard

Scotland; 85 (17.4 overs)	v	India; 89/2 (6.3 overs)
George Munsey 24 (19); Mohammed Shami 3/15 (3 overs)		KL Rahul 50 (19); Mark Watt 1/20 (2 overs)

India won by 8 wickets
Dubai International Cricket Stadium, Dubai
Umpires: Marais Erasmus (SA) and Rod Tucker (Aus)
Player of the match: Ravindra Jadeja (Ind)

- India won the toss and elected to field.

7 November 2021
18:00 (N)
Scorecard

Pakistan; 189/4 (20 overs)	v	Scotland; 117/6 (20 overs)
Babar Azam 66 (47); Chris Greaves 2/43 (4 overs)		Richie Berrington 54* (37); Shadab Khan 2/14 (4 overs)

Pakistan won by 72 runs
Sharjah Cricket Stadium, Sharjah
Umpires: Rod Tucker (Aus) and Paul Wilson (Aus)
Player of the match: Shoaib Malik (Pak)

- Pakistan won the toss and elected to bat.

=== 2022 World Cup ===
Squad and kit

- Richard Berrington (c)
- Matthew Cross (vc, wk)
- Josh Davey
- Calum MacLeod
- Brandon McMullen
- Michael Leask
- Safyaan Sharif
- Hamza Tahir
- Chris Greaves
- Mark Watt
- George Munsey
- Brad Wheal
- Michael Jones
- Craig Wallace (wk)
- Chris Sole

2022 kit

Results

First round (Group B)				Super 12		Semifinal	Final	Overall Result
Opposition Result	Opposition Result	Opposition Result	Rank	Opposition Result	Rank	Opposition Result	Opposition Result	Overall Result
West Indies; Won by 42 runs	Ireland; Lost by 6 wickets	Zimbabwe; Lost by 5 wickets	3	Did not advance				First round
Source: Cricinfo

Scorecards

First round (Group B)

17 October 2022
15:00
Scorecard

Scotland; 160/5 (20 overs)	v	West Indies; 118 (18.3 overs)
George Munsey 66* (53); Jason Holder 2/14 (3 overs)		Jason Holder 38 (33); Mark Watt 3/12 (4 overs)

Scotland won by 42 runs
Bellerive Oval, Hobart
Umpires: Aleem Dar (Pak) and Paul Wilson (Aus)
Player of the match: George Munsey (Sco)

- West Indies won the toss and elected to field.

19 October 2022
15:00
Scorecard

Scotland; 176/5 (20 overs)	v	Ireland; 180/4 (19 overs)
Michael Jones 86 (55); Curtis Campher 2/9 (2 overs)		Curtis Campher 72* (32); Michael Leask 1/16 (2 overs)

Ireland won by 6 wickets
Bellerive Oval, Hobart
Umpires: Chris Brown (NZ) and Kumar Dharmasena (SL)
Player of the match: Curtis Campher (Ire)

- Scotland won the toss and elected to bat.

21 October 2022
19:00 (N)
Scorecard

Scotland; 132/6 (20 overs)	v	Zimbabwe; 133/5 (18.3 overs)
George Munsey 54 (51); Tendai Chatara 2/14 (4 overs)		Craig Ervine 58 (54); Josh Davey 2/16 (3 overs)

Zimbabwe won by 5 wickets
Bellerive Oval, Hobart
Umpires: Michael Gough (Eng) and Nitin Menon (Ind)
Player of the match: Sikandar Raza (Zim)

- Scotland won the toss and elected to bat.
- Scotland were eliminated as a result of this match.

=== 2024 World Cup ===
Squad and kit

- Richard Berrington (c)
- Matthew Cross (vc, wk)
- Josh Davey
- Calum MacLeod
- Brandon McMullen
- Michael Leask
- Safyaan Sharif
- Hamza Tahir
- Chris Greaves
- Mark Watt
- George Munsey
- Brad Wheal
- Michael Jones
- Craig Wallace (wk)
- Chris Sole

2024 kit

Results

Group stage (Group B)					Super 8		Semifinal	Final	Overall Result
Opposition Result	Opposition Result	Opposition Result	Opposition Result	Rank	Opposition Result	Rank	Opposition Result	Opposition Result	Overall Result
England; No Result	Namibia; Won by 5 wickets	Oman; Won by 7 wickets	Australia; Lost by 5 wickets	3	Did not advance				Group stage
Source: Cricinfo

Scorecards

Group stage (Group B)

4 June 2024
10:30 UTC−4
Scorecard

Scotland; 90/0 (10 overs)	v	England
Michael Jones 45* (30)

No result
Kensington Oval, Bridgetown
Umpires: Nitin Menon (Ind) and Asif Yaqoob (Pak)

- Scotland won the toss and elected to bat.
- The match was reduced to 10 overs per side due to rain.
- England were set a revised target of 109 from 10 overs due to rain.
- No further play was possible due to rain.

6 June 2024
15:00 UTC−4
Scorecard

Namibia; 155/9 (20 overs)	v	Scotland; 157/5 (18.3 overs)
Gerhard Erasmus 52 (31); Brad Wheal 3/33 (4 overs)		Richie Berrington 47* (35); Gerhard Erasmus 2/29 (4 overs)

Scotland won by 5 wickets
Kensington Oval, Bridgetown
Umpires: Jayaraman Madanagopal (Ind) and Nitin Menon (Ind)
Player of the match: Michael Leask (Sco)

- Namibia won the toss and elected to bat.

9 June 2024
13:00 UTC−4
Scorecard

Oman; 150/7 (20 overs)	v	Scotland; 153/3 (13.1 overs)
Pratik Athavale 54 (40); Safyaan Sharif 2/40 (4 overs)		Brandon McMullen 61* (31); Bilal Khan 1/12 (2.1 overs)

Scotland won by 7 wickets
Sir Vivian Richards Stadium, North Sound
Umpires: Chris Brown (NZ) and Allahudien Paleker (SA)
Player of the match: Brandon McMullen (Sco)

- Oman won the toss and elected to bat.

15 June 2024
20:30 UTC−4 (N)
Scorecard

Scotland; 180/5 (20 overs)	v	Australia; 186/5 (19.4 overs)
Brandon McMullen 60 (34); Glenn Maxwell 2/44 (4 overs)		Travis Head 68 (49); Mark Watt 2/34 (4 overs)

Australia won by 5 wickets
Daren Sammy Cricket Ground, Gros Islet
Umpires: Michael Gough (Eng) and Asif Yaqoob (Pak)
Player of the match: Marcus Stoinis (Aus)

- Australia won the toss and elected to field.

=== 2026 World Cup ===
Squad and kit

- Richie Berrington (c)
- Brad Currie
- Matthew Cross (wk)
- Chris Greaves
- Brandon McMullen
- Finlay McCreath
- Michael Leask
- Tom Bruce
- Oliver Davidson
- Michael Jones
- Safyaan Sharif
- Mark Watt
- Brad Wheal
- George Munsey
- Zainullah Ihsan

Reserve players:

- Jack Jarvis
- Jasper Davidson

2026 kit

Results

Group stage (Group C)					Super 8		Semifinal	Final	Overall Result
Opposition Result	Opposition Result	Opposition Result	Opposition Result	Rank	Opposition Result	Rank	Opposition Result	Opposition Result	Overall Result
West Indies; Lost by 35 runs	Italy; Won by 73 runs	England; Lost by 5 wickets	Nepal; Lost by 7 wickets	3	Did not advance				Group stage
Source: Cricinfo

Scorecards

Group stage (Group C)

Match 2
7 February 2026
15:00 UTC+5:30 (D/N)
Scorecard

West Indies; 182/5 (20 overs)	v	Scotland; 147 (18.5 overs)
Shimron Hetmyer 64 (36); Brad Currie 2/23 (4 overs)		Richie Berrington 42 (24); Romario Shepherd 5/20 (3)

West Indies won by 35 runs
Eden Gardens, Kolkata
Attendance: 15,080
Umpires: Nitin Menon (Ind) and Sam Nogajski (Aus)
Player of the match: Shimron Hetmyer (WI)

- Scotland won the toss and elected to field.
- Oliver Davidson (Sco) made his T20I debut.
- Tom Bruce played his first T20I for Scotland after having previously played 17 T20Is for New Zealand, becoming the 24th cricketer to represent two international teams in T20Is.
- Shimron Hetmyer (WI) broke Chris Gayle's record of the fastest half-century by a West Indies batter in the T20 World Cup (22 balls).
- Jason Holder (WI) became the first player for West Indies to take 100 wickets in T20Is.
- Romario Shepherd (WI) took his second hat-trick and maiden five-wicket haul in T20Is and the 13th overall in T20 World Cups. This was the first hat-trick in this edition and overall the tenth in the T20 World Cup.

Match 7
9 February 2026
11:00 UTC+5:30
Scorecard

Scotland; 207/4 (20 overs)	v	Italy; 134 (16.4 overs)
George Munsey 84 (54); Ali Hasan 1/21 (4 overs)		Ben Manenti 52 (31); Michael Leask 4/17 (4 overs)

Scotland won by 73 runs
Eden Gardens, Kolkata
Umpires: Chris Brown (NZ) and Allahuddien Paleker (SA)
Player of the match: Michael Leask (Sco)

- Italy won the toss and elected to field.
- Italy made their T20 World Cup debut.
- This was Scotland's highest innings total in the T20 World Cup (207). This was also the highest score made by an associate nation in the tournament.

Match 23
14 February 2026
15:00 UTC+5:30 (D/N)
Scorecard

Scotland; 152 (19.4 overs)	v	England; 155/5 (18.2 overs)
Richie Berrington 49 (32); Adil Rashid 3/36 (4 overs)		Tom Banton 63* (41); Oliver Davidson 1/12 (2 overs)

England won by 5 wickets
Eden Gardens, Kolkata
Umpires: Chris Brown (NZ) and Allahuddien Paleker (SA)
Player of the match: Tom Banton (Eng)

- England won the toss and elected to field.
- Jos Buttler (Eng) played in his 150th T20I match and scored his 4,000th run in T20Is.
- Jofra Archer (Eng) took his 50th wicket in T20Is.
- This was England's maiden victory against a European country in T20 World Cups.

Match 33
17 February 2026
19:00 UTC+5:30 (N)
Scorecard

Scotland; 170/7 (20 overs)	v	Nepal; 171/3 (19.2 overs)
Michael Jones 71 (45); Sompal Kami 3/25 (4 overs)		Dipendra Singh Airee 50* (23); Michael Leask 3/30 (4 overs)

Nepal won by 7 wickets
Wankhede Stadium, Mumbai
Attendance: 18,920
Umpires: K. N. Ananthapadmanabhan (Ind) and Alex Wharf (Eng)
Player of the match: Dipendra Singh Airee (Nep)

- Nepal won the toss and elected to field.
- This was Nepal's first win in a T20 World Cup match after 12 years.

== Records and statistics ==
=== Team records ===
Highest innings totals
Score	Opponent	Venue	Season
207/4 (20 overs)	Italy	Kolkata	2026
180/5 (20 overs)	Australia	Gros Islet	2024
176/5 (20 overs)	Ireland	Hobart	2022
170/7 (20 overs)	Nepal	Mumbai	2026
165/9 (20 overs)	Papua New Guinea	Al Amerat	2021
Last updated: 8 March 2026

=== Most appearances ===
This list consists players with most number of matches at the T20 World Cup. Richie Berrington has played a total of 22 matches, and has captained the team in 12 of their World Cup matches. Three other players jointly hold the record for most caps at the tournament with 22 matches.

Most matches
Matches	Player	Period
22	Richie Berrington	2016–2026
22	Matthew Cross	2016–2026
22	George Munsey	2016–2026
22	Mark Watt	2016–2026
20	Michael Leask	2016–2026
18	Brad Wheal	2021–2026
Last updated: 8 March 2026

=== Batting records ===
Most runs
Runs	Player	Mat	Inn	Avg	100s	50s	Period
599	George Munsey	22	22	29.95	—N/a	3	2016–2026
505	Richie Berrington	22	20	31.56	—N/a	2	2016–2026
341	Michael Jones	11	11	34.10	—N/a	2	2022–2026
250	Matthew Cross	22	20	14.70	—N/a	—N/a	2016–2026
239	Michael Leask	20	17	17.07	—N/a	—N/a	2016–2026
Last updated: 8 March 2026

Highest individual innings
Score	Player	Opponent	Venue	Year
86	Michael Jones	Ireland	Hobart	2022
84	George Munsey	Italy	Kolkata	2026
71	Michael Jones	Nepal	Mumbai	2026
70	Richie Berrington	Papua New Guinea	Al Amerat	2021
66*	George Munsey	West Indies	Hobart	2022
Last updated: 8 March 2026

Most 50+ scores
Fifties	Player	Period
3	George Munsey	2016–2026
2	Brandon McMullen	2024–2026
2	Michael Jones	2022–2026
2	Richie Berrington	2016–2026
Last updated: 8 March 2026

=== Bowling records ===
Most wickets
Wickets	Player	Matches	Avg.	Econ.	4W	5W	Period
21	Mark Watt	22	26.85	7.05	0	0	2016–2026
19	Brad Wheal	18	25.57	8.10	0	0	2021–2026
18	Michael Leask	20	21.50	7.74	1	0	2016–2026
17	Safyaan Sharif	15	26.70	8.70	0	0	2016–2026
14	Josh Davey	11	21.85	7.94	1	0	2016–2022
Last updated: 8 March 2026

Best innings figures
Player	Bowling figures	Opponent	Venue	Year
Michael Leask	4/17 (4 overs)	Italy	Kolkata	2026
Josh Davey	4/18 (3.3 overs)	Papua New Guinea	Al Amerat	2021
Mark Watt	3/12 (4 overs)	West Indies	Hobart	2022
Brad Wheal	3/24 (4 overs)	Bangladesh	Al Amerat	2021
Josh Davey	3/25 (4 overs)	Oman	Al Amerat	2021
Last updated: 8 March 2026

=== Partnership records ===
Highest partnerships by runs
Runs	Players	Opposition	Venue	Season
126 (1st wicket)	George Munsey & Michael Jones	v Italy	Kolkata	2026
92 (3rd wicket)	Matthew Cross & Richie Berrington	v Papua New Guinea	Al Amerat	2021
90* (1st wicket)	George Munsey & Michael Jones	v England	Bridgetown	2024
89 (2nd wicket)	George Munsey & Brandon McMullen	v Australia	Gros Islet	2024
84 (1st wicket)	George Munsey & Kyle Coetzer	v Afghanistan	Nagpur	2016
Last updated: 8 March 2026

=== Wicket-keeping records ===
Most dismissals
Dismissals	Player	Matches	Cat.	St.	Period
16	Matthew Cross	22	12	4	2016–2026
3	Colin Smith	4	1	2	2007–2009
Last updated: 8 March 2026

=== Fielding records ===
Most catches
Catches	Player	Matches	Period
12	Calum MacLeod	13	2009–2022
12	George Munsey	22	2016–2026
9	Michael Jones	11	2022–2026
9	Brad Wheal	18	2021–2026
7	Chris Greaves	15	2021–2024
Last updated: 8 March 2026

== See also ==
- Scotland at the Cricket World Cup
- ICC Men's T20 World Cup
