= List of Scotland Twenty20 International cricket records =

This is a list of Scotland Twenty20 International cricket records, that is record team and individual performances in Twenty20 International cricket. It is based on the List of Twenty20 International records.

Scotland played its first international Twenty20 game against Ireland in August 2008 and registered first T20i win against Bermuda on the very next day.

== Listing criteria ==
In general the top five are listed in each category (except when there is a tie for the last place among the five, when all the tied record holders are noted). Currently active players are listed in bold.

== Team records ==
=== Overall results ===
==== Matches played (total) ====
First T20I	Matches	Won	Lost	Tied	NR	% Won
Last updated: 21 October 2021

==== Matches played (by country) ====
Opponent	First T20I	Matches	Won	Lost	Tied	NR	% Won
Afghanistan	10 February 2010	7	0	7	0	0	0.00
Bangladesh	24 June 2012	2	2	0	0	0	100.00
Bermuda	3 August 2008	2	2	0	0	0	100.00
Canada	23 March 2012	1	1	0	0	0	100.00
Hong Kong	25 July 2015	5	4	1	0	0	80.00
India	13 September 2007	2	0	1	0	1	0.00
Ireland	2 August 2008	15	4	8	1	2	30.00
Kenya	4 August 2008	8	5	3	0	0	62.50
Namibia	22 October 2019	3	0	3	0	0	0.00
Netherlands	4 August 2008	15	8	7	0	0	53.33
New Zealand	6 June 2009	4	0	4	0	0	0.00
Oman	19 January 2017	4	4	0	0	0	100.00
Pakistan	12 September 2007	3	0	3	0	0	0.00
Papua New Guinea	21 October 2019	3	3	0	0	0	100.00
Singapore	18 October 2019	1	0	1	0	0	100.00
South Africa	7 June 2009	1	0	1	0	0	0.00
West Indies	17 October 2022	1	1	0	0	0	100.00
United Arab Emirates	9 July 2015	6	4	2	0	0	66.67
Zimbabwe	10 March 2016	5	1	4	0	0	20.00
Last updated: 22 May 2024

=== Team scoring records ===
==== Highest innings totals ====
Rank	Score	Opponent	Venue	Date
1	252/3 (20 overs)	Netherlands	Malahide Cricket Club Ground, Dublin, Ireland	16 September 2019
2	245/2 (20 overs)	Italy	The Grange Club, Edinburgh, Scotland	24 July 2023
3	234/5 (20 overs)	Germany	Goldenacre Sports Ground, Edinburgh, Scotland	20 July 2023
4	232/2 (20 overs)	Austria	Goldenacre Sports Ground, Edinburgh, Scotland	25 July 2023
5	221/3 (20 overs)	Netherlands	VRA Cricket Ground, Amstelveen, Netherlands	20 June 2018
Last updated: 25 July 2023

==== Highest match aggregate ====
Rank	Score	Teams	Venue	Date
1	446/10 (40 overs)	Scotland (252/3) v Netherlands (194/7)	Malahide Cricket Club Ground, Dublin, Ireland	16 September 2019
2	418/15 (40 overs)	Scotland (213/6) v Ireland (205/9)	The Grange Club, Edinburgh, Scotland	28 July 2023
3	406/14 (40 overs)	New Zealand (254/5) v Scotland (152/9)	The Grange Club, Edinburgh, Scotland	29 July 2022
4	387/13 (37.4 overs)	Scotland (193/7) v Ireland (194/6)	Malahide Cricket Club Ground, Dublin, Ireland	17 September 2019
5	383/15 (39.2 overs)	Afghanistan (210/5) v Scotland (173)	The Grange Club, Edinburgh, Scotland	12 July 2015
Note: Teams are shown in batting order. Last updated: 28 July 2023

==== Largest successful run chases ====
Rank	Score	Opponent	Venue	Date
1	181/4 (18.3 overs)	Ireland	Muscat	15 February 2019
2	168/5 (19 overs)	Oman	Dubai (GCA)	31 October 2019
3	167/4 (18.1 overs)	Ireland	Magheramason	20 June 2015
4	161/3 (17.4 overs)	Netherlands	Amstelveen	19 June 2018
5	150/4 (16.1 overs)	Ireland	Magheramason	18 June 2015
Last updated: 9 November 2019

==== Lowest innings totals ====
Rank	Score	Opponent	Venue	Date
1	81 (15.4 overs)	South Africa	The Oval	7 June 2009
2	82 (14.4 overs)	Pakistan	Edinburgh	13 June 2018
3	91 (13.2 overs)	Kenya	Dubai (GCA)	19 November 2013
4	99 (18.3 overs)	Ireland	Dubai (DSC)	11 February 2010
5	105/6 (20 overs)	Afghanistan	Sharjah	3 March 2013
Note: This list does not include innings scores where Scotland batted second and successfully reached a victory target in under 20 overs. Last updated: 9 November 2019

==== Lowest match aggregate ====
Rank	Score	Teams	Venue	Date
1	138/8 (16.2 overs)	Scotland (66/7) v Hong Kong (72/1)	Mong Kog	30 January 2016
2	179/7 (13 overs)	Scotland (89/4) v New Zealand (90/3)	The Oval	6 June 2009
3	191/16 (38.5 overs)	Scotland (113/6) v Kenya (78)	Aberdeen	4 July 2013
4	199/9 (37.4 overs)	Bermuda (99/7) v Scotland (100/2)	Belfast	3 August 2008
5	205/9 (28 overs)	Hong Kong (127/7) v Scotland (78/2)	Nagpur	12 March 2016
Note: Teams are shown in batting order. Last updated: 9 November 2019

==== Largest margin of victory (by wickets) ====
Rank	Margin	Teams	Venue	Date
1	9 wickets	Scotland (107/1) beat Kenya (106/9)	Belfast	4 August 2008
1	9 wickets	Scotland (110/1) beat United Arab Emirates (109)	Edinburgh	9 July 2015
3	8 wickets	Scotland (100/2) beat Bermuda (99/7)	Belfast	3 August 2008
3	8 wickets	Scotland (78/2) beat Hong Kong (127/7) (D/L)	Nagpur	12 March 2016
4	7 wickets	Scotland (106/3) beat Kenya (100/8)	Aberdeen	5 July 2013
4	7 wickets	Scotland (134/3) beat Oman (133)	Dubai (DSC)	19 January 2017
4	7 wickets	Scotland (161/3) beat Netherlands (160/6)	Amstelveen	19 June 2018
4	7 wickets	Scotland (115/3) beat Oman (111)	Muscat	17 February 2019
Last updated: 9 November 2019

==== Largest margin of victory (by runs) ====
Rank	Margin	Teams	Venue	Date
1	115 runs	Scotland (221/3) beat Netherlands (106)	Amstelveen	20 June 2018
2	90 runs	Scotland (198/6) beat United Arab Emirates (108)	Dubai (DSC)	30 October 2019
3	58 runs	Scotland (252/3) beat Netherlands (194/7)	Dublin (Malahide)	16 September 2019
4	46 runs	Scotland (204/4) beat Bermuda (158/8)	Dubai (DSC)	24 October 2019
5	37 runs	Scotland (161/9) beat Hong Kong (124)	Mong Kog	31 January 2016
5	37 runs	Scotland (140/5) beat Netherlands (103)	Dubai (GCA)	5 February 2016
Last updated: 9 November 2019

==== Largest margin of victory (by balls remaining) ====
Rank	Margin	Balls	Teams	Venue	Date
1	9 wickets	60	Scotland (110/1) beat United Arab Emirates (109)	Edinburgh	9 July 2015
2	5 wickets	46	Scotland (117/5) beat Hong Kong (116)	Dublin (Malahide)	25 July 2015
3	6 wickets	40	Scotland (126/4) beat Netherlands (123)	Dublin (Malahide)	19 September 2019
4	7 wickets	27	Scotland (115/3) beat Oman (111)	Muscat	17 February 2019
5	6 wickets	23	Scotland (150/4) beat Ireland (146/5)	Magheramason	18 June 2015
Last updated: 9 November 2019

==== Smallest margin of victory (by runs) ====
Rank	Margin	Teams	Venue	Date
1	4 runs	Scotland (146/6) beat Papua New Guinea (142/9)	Dubai (GCA)	21 October 2019
2	7 runs	Scotland (148/7) beat Netherlands (141/7)	Abu Dhabi	17 January 2017
3	14 runs	Scotland (178/7) beat Kenya (164)	Dubai (GCA)	13 March 2012
4	15 runs	Scotland (165/4) beat Netherlands (150/6)	Dubai (GCA)	22 November 2013
5	24 runs	Scotland (189/3) beat Hong Kong (165/6)	Abu Dhabi	14 January 2017
Last updated: 9 November 2019

==== Smallest margin of victory (by wickets) ====
Rank	Margin	Teams	Venue	Date
1	4 wickets	Scotland (136/6) beat Canada (135/8)	Dubai (DSC)	23 March 2012
2	5 wickets	Scotland (117/5) beat Hong Kong (116)	Dublin (Malahide)	25 July 2015
2	5 wickets	Scotland (168/5) beat Oman (167/7)	Dubai (GCA)	31 October 2019
3	6 wickets	Scotland (150/4) beat Ireland (146/5)	Magheramason	18 June 2015
3	6 wickets	Scotland (167/4) beat Ireland (166/6)	Magheramason	20 June 2015
3	6 wickets	Scotland (181/4) beat Ireland (180/7)	Muscat	15 February 2019
3	6 wickets	Scotland (126/4) beat Netherlands (123)	Dublin (Malahide)	19 September 2019
Last updated: 9 November 2019

==== Smallest margin of victory (by balls remaining) ====
Rank	Margin	Balls	Teams	Venue	Date
1	4 wickets	0	Scotland (136/6) beat Canada (135/8)	Dubai (DSC)	23 March 2012
2	7 wickets	6	Scotland (134/3) beat Oman (133)	Dubai (DSC)	19 January 2017
2	5 Wickets	6	Scotland (168/5) beat Oman (167/7)	Dubai (GCA)	31 October 2019
3	7 wickets	9	Scotland (106/3) beat Kenya (100/8)	Aberdeen	5 July 2013
3	6 wickets	9	Scotland (181/4) beat Ireland (180/7)	Muscat	15 February 2019
Last updated: 9 November 2019

==== Tied matches ====
No.	Teams	Tiebreaker	Winner	Venue	Date
1	Scotland (185/4) tied with Ireland (185/6)	Tied	-	Deventer	17 June 2018
Last updated: 9 November 2019

== Individual records ==
=== Individual records (batting) ===
==== Most career runs ====
Rank	Runs	Player	Innings	Not outs	Average
1	1,620	**Richie Berrington**	62	13	33.06
2	1,458	**Kyle Coetzer**	64	2	23.52
3	1,182	**George Munsey**	44	3	28.82
4	1,129	**Calum MacLeod**	53	9	25.65
5	893	**Matthew Cross**	41	7	26.26
Last updated: 21 October 2021

==== Highest individual score ====
Rank	Runs	Player	Opposition	Venue	Date
1	132	George Munsey	Austria	Goldenacre Sports Ground, Edinburgh, Scotland	25 July 2023
2	127*	George Munsey	Netherlands	Malahide Cricket Club Ground, Dublin, Ireland	16 September 2019
3	127*	Oli Hairs	Italy	The Grange Club, Edinburgh, Scotland	24 July 2023
4	100	Richie Berrington	Bangladesh	Sportpark Westvliet, Voorburg, Netherlands	24 July 2012
5	96	Brandon McMullen	Italy	The Grange Club, Edinburgh, Scotland	24 July 2023
Last updated: 25 July 2023

==== Highest career average ====
Rank	Average	Player	Runs	Innings	Not outs
1	29.90	**George Munsey**	987	36	3
2	28.34	**Richie Berrington**	1,247	54	10
3	26.05	**Calum MacLeod**	1,042	47	7
4	26.03	**Matthew Cross**	755	35	6
5	25.66	**Kyle Coetzer**	1,386	56	2
Qualification: 20 innings. Last updated: 9 November 2019

==== Highest career strike rate ====
Rank	Player	Strike rate	Balls faced	Runs
1	**George Munsey**	154.21	640	987
2	**Richie Berrington**	128.95	967	1,247
3	Matt Machan	127.98	318	407
4	Preston Mommsen	127.35	329	419
5	**Matthew Cross**	127.31	593	755
Qualification: 250 balls. Last updated: 9 November 2019

==== Most career sixes ====
Rank	Sixes	Player
1	54	**George Munsey**
2	52	**Richie Berrington**
3	48	**Kyle Coetzer**
4	25	**Matthew Cross**
5	22	**Calum MacLeod**
Last updated: 26 October 2021

==== Most career fours ====
Rank	Fours	Player
1	149	**Kyle Coetzer**
2	142	**Richie Berrington**
3	137	**George Munsey**
4	99	**Calum MacLeod**
5	84	**Matthew Cross**
Last updated: 20 October 2021

=== Individual records (bowling) ===
==== Best figures in a match ====
Rank	Bowling	Player	Opponent	Venue	Date
1	5/24	**Alasdair Evans**	Netherlands	Edinburgh	11 July 2015
2	5/27	**Mark Watt**	Netherlands	Dubai (GCA)	5 February 2016
3	4/24	**Safyaan Sharif**	United Arab Emirates	Dubai (GCA)	4 February 2016
4	4/30	Hamza Tahir	Netherlands	Dublin (Malahide)	19 September 2019
5	4/34	Josh Davey	Netherlands	Abu Dhabi	17 January 2017
Last updated: 9 November 2019

==== Most career wickets ====
Rank	Wickets	Player
1	73	**Mark Watt**
2	72	**Safyaan Sharif**
3	41	Alasdair Evans
4	39	**Michael Leask**
5	37	Josh Davey
Last updated: 18 May 2024

==== Best career economy rate ====
Rank	Economy rate	Player	Overs	Runs
1	6.29	Majid Haq	75.0	472
2	6.92	Gordon Drummond	55.0	381
3	7.22	**Mark Watt**	125	903
4	7.40	**Alasdair Evans**	93	689
5	7.48	**Richie Berrington**	81.2	609
Qualification: 250 balls. Last updated: 9 November 2019

==== Best career strike rate ====
Rank	Strike rate	Player	Wickets	Balls
1	14.3	**Hamza Tahir**	18	258
2	15.5	**Alasdair Evans**	36	558
3	16.0	Majid Haq	28	450
4	16.6	**Mark Watt**	45	750
5	17.6	**Safyaan Sharif**	49	863
Qualification: 250 balls. Last updated: 9 November 2019

==== Best career average ====
Rank	Average	Player	Wickets	Runs
1	16.85	Majid Haq	28	472
2	19.35	**Hamza Tahir**	20	387
3	20.15	**Mark Watt**	53	1068
4	20.70	**Alexander Evans**	40	828
5	22.82	**Josh Davey**	34	776
Qualification: 250 balls. Last updated: 26 October 2021

=== Individual records (wicketkeeping ) ===
==== Most dismissals in career ====
Rank	Dismissals	Player	Innings	Catches	Stumpings
1	41	**Matthew Cross**	47	28	13
2	9	Colin Smith	7	5	4
3	8	**Craig Wallace**	7	6	2
4	1	David Murphy	4	1	0
4	1	Simon Smith	5	1	0
Last updated: 21 October 2021

=== Individual records (fielding) ===
==== Most catches (non-wicketkeeper) ====
Rank	Catches	Player
1	32	**Calum MacLeod**
2	22	**Kyle Coetzer**
3	20	**Michael Leask**
4	17	**George Munsey**
5	14	**Josh Davey**
Last updated: 26 October 2021

=== Individual records (other) ===
==== Most matches played in career ====
Rank	Matches	Player	Period
1	69	**Richie Berrington**	2008–
2	66	**Kyle Coetzer**	2008–
3	56	**Calum MacLeod**	2009–
4	51	**Matthew Cross**	2013-
5	48	**Safyaan Sharif**	2012–
Last updated: 21 October 2021

== Partnership records ==
=== Record wicket partnerships ===
Partnership	Runs	Players	Opponent	Venue	Date
1st wicket	200	**George Munsey** & **Kyle Coetzer**	Netherlands	Dublin (Malahide)	16 September 2019
2nd wicket	84	**George Munsey** & **Matthew Cross**	Netherlands	Amstelveen	20 June 2018
3rd wicket	127	**Calum MacLeod** & **Richie Berrington**	Hong Kong	Abu Dhabi	17 January 2017
4th wicket	79	Fraser Watts & **Kyle Coetzer**	Ireland	Dubai (DSC)	18 March 2012
5th wicket	72*	Matt Machan & Robert Taylor	Netherlands	Dubai (GCA)	22 November 2013
6th wicket	65	Gavin Hamilton & Jan Stander	Kenya	Nairobi (Gym)	4 February 2010
7th wicket	38	**Kyle Coetzer** & Majid Haq	South Africa	The Oval	7 June 2009
8th wicket	80	Preston Mommsen & **Safyaan Sharif**	Netherlands	Edinburgh	11 July 2015
9th wicket	28*	**Safyaan Sharif** & **Josh Davey**	Namibia	Dubai (GCA)	22 October 2019
10th wicket	21*	Dewald Nel & Majid Haq	Kenya	Nairobi (Gym)	1 February 2010
Last updated: 9 November 2019

*Note: An asterisk (*) signifies an unbroken partnership (i.e. neither of the batsmen were dismissed before either the end of the allotted overs or they reached the required score).

=== Highest partnerships ===
Rank	Runs	Wicket	Players	Opponent	Venue	Date
1	200	1st wicket	**George Munsey** & **Kyle Coetzer**	Netherlands	Dublin (Malahide)	16 September 2019
2	127	3rd wicket	**Calum MacLeod** & **Richie Berrington**	Hong Kong	Abu Dhabi	17 January 2017
3	122	3rd wicket	**Matthew Cross** & **Richie Berrington**	Ireland	Dublin (Malahide)	29 September 2019
4	111	3rd wicket	Matt Machan & **Michael Leask**	Netherlands	Abu Dhabi	28 November 2013
5	109	1st wicket	**George Munsey** & **Kyle Coetzer**	Ireland	Muscat	15 February 2019
Last updated: 9 November 2019

*Note: An asterisk (*) signifies an unbroken partnership (i.e. neither of the batsmen were dismissed before either the end of the allotted overs or they reached the required score).

== See also ==
- List of Twenty20 International records
