= Scottish cricket team in Ireland in 2014 =

Scotland cricket team in Ireland in 2014
	Ireland	Scotland
- Dates: 8 September 2014 – 12 September 2014
Captains	Kevin O'Brien	Preston Mommsen

One Day International series
- Results: Ireland won the 3-match series 2–1
Most runs	Kevin O'Brien (159)	Calum MacLeod (145)
Most wickets	Craig Young (6)	Majid Haq (5)
- Player of the series: Craig Young (Ire)

The Scotland cricket team toured Ireland from 8 to 12 September 2014, playing three ODI matches against the Irish team. Ireland won the series 2–1.

== Squads ==
ODIs
Ireland	Scotland
Kevin O'Brien (C); John Anderson; Andrew Balbirnie; George Dockrell; John Mooney; Andrew McBrine; Graeme McCarter; Andrew Poynter (wk); Stuart Poynter; Max Sorensen; Stuart Thompson; Andrew White; Craig Young	Preston Mommsen (C); Alasdair Evans; Calum MacLeod; Freddie Coleman; Hamish Gardiner; Iain Wardlaw; Josh Davey; Majid Haq; Matt Machan; Matty Cross (wk); Michael Leask; Richie Berrington; Safyaan Sharif

== ODI series ==
=== 1st ODI ===
9 September 2014
10:00
Scorecard

Scotland; 172 (40.3 overs)	v	Ireland; 173/3 (37.4 overs)
Michael Leask 50 (50); Craig Young 5/46 (10 overs)		Kevin O'Brien 56* (56); Josh Davey 1/24 (9 overs)

Ireland won by 7 wickets
Malahide Cricket Club Ground, Dublin
Umpires: Michael Gough (Eng) and Mark Hawthorne (Ire)

- Ireland won the toss and elected to field.
- John Anderson, Andrew McBrine, Stuart Poynter and Craig Young (all Ireland) made their ODI debuts.

=== 2nd ODI ===
10 September 2014
10:00
Scorecard

Scotland; 221 (49.5 overs)	v	Ireland; 225/7 (44.2 overs)
Richie Berrington 101 (126); Max Sorensen 4/40 (10 overs)		Kevin O'Brien 67 (65); Alasdair Evans 2/34 (10 overs)

Ireland won by 3 wickets
The Village, Dublin
Umpires: Michael Gough (Eng) and Mark Hawthorne (Ire)

- Ireland won the toss and elected to field.
- The start of the match was delayed due to a wet outfield.

=== 3rd ODI ===
12 September 2014
10:00
Scorecard

Ireland; 241/9 (50 overs)	v	Scotland; 243/1 (45.4 overs)
John Mooney 96 (77); Majid Haq 5/54 (10 overs)		Calum MacLeod 116* (141); Andrew McBrine 1/31 (4 overs)

Scotland won by 8 wickets
The Village, Dublin
Umpires: Michael Gough (Eng) and Mark Hawthorne (Ire)

- Scotland won the toss and elected to field.
- The start of the match was delayed due to a wet outfield.
- Graeme McCarter (Ire) made his ODI debut.

== See also ==
- 2014 Irish cricket season
