= 2014 Associate tour of Australia and New Zealand =

Cricket matches

ICC Cricket World Cup Associate warm-up matches were cricket matches arranged by the International Cricket Council to assist the Afghanistan, Ireland, Scotland and United Arab Emirates national cricket teams to prepare for the 2015 World Cup by familiarise themselves with the playing conditions in Australia and New Zealand.

These teams played against state and regional sides, and were given the opportunity to train with specialist coaches such as Dav Whatmore as part of the ICC High Performance Programme (HPP).

== Afghanistan matches ==
=== 1st match ===
21 September 2014 (D/N)
Scorecard

Afghanistan; 114 (28.5 overs)	v	Western Australia XI; 116/3 (33.3 overs)
Mohammad Nabi 35 (39); Andrew Tye 4/30 (8 overs)		William Bosisto 43* (82); Dawlat Zadran 2/24 (8 overs)

Western Australia XI won by 7 wickets
Western Australia Cricket Association Ground, Perth
Umpires: James Hewitt and Todd Rann

- Western Australia XI won the toss and elected to field
- Match played on the reserve day (22 September)
- 12 players per side (11 batting, 11 fielding)

=== 2nd match ===
23 September 2014
Scorecard

Western Australia XI; 235 (49.1 overs)	v	Afghanistan; 142 (42.2 overs)
Tom Beaton 87 (106); Sharafuddin Ashraf 3/33 (9.1 overs)		Asghar Stanikzai 23 (25); David Moody 2/24 (8.2 overs)

Western Australia XI won by 93 runs
Western Australia Cricket Association Ground, Perth
Umpires: James Hewitt and Nathan Johnstone

- Western Australia XI won the toss and elected to bat
- 12 players per side (11 batting, 11 fielding)

=== 3rd match ===
26 September 2014
Scorecard

Australian Capital Territory; 266 (49 overs)	v	Afghanistan; 268/7 (49.2 overs)
Andrew Harriott 66 (103); Aftab Alam 4/41 (9 overs)		Nawroz Mangal 85 (100); Daniel Magin 2/48 (10 overs)

Afghanistan won by 3 wickets
Manuka Oval, Canberra
Umpires: Stuart Grocock and Yohan Ramasundara

- Afghanistan won the toss and elected to field
- 12 players per side (11 batting, 11 fielding)

=== 4th match ===
2 October 2014
Scorecard

(New Zealand) Auckland; 314/9 (50 overs)	v	Afghanistan; 137 (33.1 overs)
Anaru Kitchen 148 (136); Shapoor Zadran 4/77 (10 overs)		Afsar Zazai 42 (53); Tarun Nethula 4/50 (8.1 overs)

Auckland won by 177 runs
Bay Oval, Mount Maunganui
Umpires: Derek Walker and Phil Jones

- Auckland won the toss and elected to bat
- 12 players per side (11 batting, 11 fielding)

=== 5th match ===
4 October 2014
Scorecard

(New Zealand) Auckland; 201/8 (45 overs)	v	Afghanistan; 202/1 (31.3 overs)
Brad Cachopa 49 (66); Dawlat Zadran 3/30 (9 overs)		Usman Ghani 107 (112); Donovan Grobbelaar 1/17 (2.3 overs)

Afghanistan won by 9 wickets
Bay Oval, Mount Maunganui
Umpires: Derek Walker and Phil Jones

- Auckland won the toss and elected to bat
- Match reduced to 45 overs per side. Played on the reserve day (5th October).
- 13 players per side (11 batting, 11 fielding)

== Ireland matches ==
=== 1st match ===
30 September 2014
Scorecard

Queensland; 322/6 (50 overs)	v	Ireland XI; 92 (30.1 overs)
Joe Burns 107 (112); Graeme McCarter 3/63 (9 overs)		George Dockrell 32* (32); Mark Steketee 3/11 (5 overs)

Queensland won by 230 runs
Kerrydale Oval, Gold Coast
Umpires: Damien Mealey and Murray Branch

- Ireland XI won the toss and elected to field first
- Queensland - 12 players (11 batting,11 fielding), Ireland XI - 13 players (11 batting, 11 fielding)

=== 2nd match ===
2 October 2014
Scorecard

Queensland; 289 (47 overs)	v	Ireland XI; 138 (33.2 overs)
James Bazley 90 (58); Craig Young 5/41 (8 overs)		Craig Young 37 (25); Alister McDermott 4/13 (4.2 overs)

Queensland won by 151 runs
Peter Burge Oval, Brisbane
Umpires: Damien Mealey

- Queensland won the toss and elected to bat
- 12 players per side (11 batting, 11 fielding)

=== 3rd match ===
7 October 2014 (D/N)
Scorecard

Ireland XI; 302/8 (50 overs)	v	Australian Capital Territory; 178 (40 overs)
Niall O'Brien 88 (79); Nathan McAndrew 2/48 (10 overs)		Nick Larkin 48 (69); Craig Young 3/36 (8 overs)

Ireland XI won by 124 runs
Manuka Oval, Canberra
Umpires: Andrew Shelley and Yohan Ramasundara

- ACT won the toss and elected to field
- 12 players per side (11 batting, 11 fielding)

=== 4th match ===
7 October 2014 (D/N)
Scorecard

Ireland XI; 153 (40.4 overs)	v	(New Zealand) Northern Districts; 157/7 (38.1 overs)
Kevin O'Brien 45 (78); Jono Boult 3/3 (2.4 overs)		Joe Carter 42 (74); George Dockrell 4/17 (6 overs)

Northern Districts won by 3 wickets
Seddon Park, Hamilton
Umpires: Phil Jones and Tim Parlane

- Northern Districts won the toss and elected to field
- 12 players per side (11 batting, 11 fielding)

=== 5th match ===
18 October 2014 (D/N)
Scorecard

New Zealand XI	v	Ireland

Match abandoned without a ball bowled
Seddon Park, Hamilton
Umpires: Derek Walker and Tim Parlane

=== 6th match ===
21 October 2014
Scorecard

(New Zealand) Canterbury; 382/6 (50 overs)	v	Ireland XI; 265 (48 overs)
Ronnie Hira 170 (129); Kevin O'Brien 1/21 (4 overs)		Andrew Poynter 57 (71); Will Williams 3/32 (7 overs)

Canterbury won by 117 runs
Bert Sutcliffe Oval, Lincoln
Umpires: Ashley Mehrotra and Barry Frost

- Canterbury won the toss and elected to bat
- Canterbury - 12 players (11 batting, 11 fielding), Ireland XI - 13 players (11 batting, 11 fielding)

=== 7th match ===
23 October 2014
Scorecard

Ireland XI; 248/8 (50 overs)	v	Otago; 251/7 (31.5 overs)
Andrew Balbirnie 59 (80); Roald Badenhorst 2/24 (6 overs)		Jesse Ryder 136 (57); Andy McBrine 2/38 (9 overs)

Otago won by 3 wickets
Bert Sutcliffe Oval, Lincoln
Umpires: Tony Gillies and Wayne Knights

- Ireland XI won the toss and elected to bat
- Ireland XI - 13 players (11 batting, 11 fielding), Otago - 12 players (11 batting, 11 fielding)

== Scotland matches ==
=== 1st match ===
29 September 2014
Scorecard

Tasmania; 303/4 (50 overs)	v	Scotland; 117 (35.4 overs)
Ed Cowan 100 (106); Iain Wardlaw 3/31 (10 overs)		Freddie Coleman 28 (52); Hamish Kingston 4/15 (7 overs)

Tasmania won by 186 runs
Kingston Twin Ovals, Hobart
Umpires: Michael Graham-Smith and Sam Nogajski

- Scotland won the toss and elected to field
- 12 players per side (11 batting, 11 fielding)

=== 2nd match ===
2 October 2014
Scorecard

Scotland; 244/8 (50 overs)	v	Tasmania; 234 (49.5 overs)
Matthew Cross 64* (50); Ryan Lees 2/26 (10 overs)		Jordan Silk 79 (96); Alasdair Evans 3/35 (10 overs)

Scotland won by 10 runs
Anzac Park, Hobart
Umpires: Michael Graham-Smith and Sam Nogajski

- Tasmania won the toss and elected to field
- 12 players per side (11 batting, 11 fielding)

=== 3rd match ===
9 October 2014
Scorecard

Queensland Academy of Sport; 268/8 (50 overs)	v	Scotland; 175 (39 overs)
Nick Stevens 64 (71); Iain Wardlaw 3/55 (10 overs)		Kyle Coetzer 55 (55); Peter George 5/24 (8 overs)

Queensland Academy won by 93 runs
John Blanck Oval, Buderim
Umpires: D Kosh and D Staines

- Scotland won the toss and elected to field
- 12 players per side (11 batting, 11 fielding)

=== 4th match ===
15 October 2014
Scorecard

New Zealand XI; 263 (50 overs)	v	Scotland; 262 (50 overs)
Corey Anderson 53 (47); Richie Berrington 3/66 (9 overs)		Matt Machan 83 (86); Corey Anderson 4/47 (7 overs)

New Zealand XI won by 1 run
Bert Sutcliffe Oval, Lincoln
Umpires: Chris Gaffaney and Derek Walker

- Scotland won the toss and elected to field
- 12 players per side (11 batting, 11 fielding)

=== 5th match ===
17 October 2014
Scorecard

Scotland; 270/7 (50 overs)	v	(New Zealand) Canterbury; 274/6 (47 overs)
Kyle Coetzer 83 (92); Andrew Ellis 4/47 (10 overs)		Neil Broom 68 (79); Josh Davey 2/43 (9 overs)

Canterbury won by 4 wickets
Hagley Oval, Christchurch
Umpires: Tony Gillies and Wayne Knights

- Scotland won the toss and elected to bat
- 12 players per side (11 batting, 11 fielding)

=== 6th match ===
20 October 2014
Scorecard

Scotland; 277/8 (50 overs)	v	(New Zealand) Wellington; 186 (46.2 overs)
Kyle Coetzer 66 (91); Andy McKay 3/57 (9 overs)		Luke Woodcock 57 (97); Safyaan Sharif 2/36 (10 overs)

Scotland won by 91 runs
Bert Sutcliffe Oval, Lincoln
Umpires: Derek Walker and Gary Baxter

- Scotland won the toss and elected to bat
- 12 players per side (11 batting, 11 fielding)

=== 7th match ===
22 October 2014
Scorecard

Otago; 361 (48.1 overs)	v	Scotland; 294 (43.4 overs)
Aaron Redmond 71 (61); Matt Machan 3/51 (7.1 overs)		Kyle Coetzer 128 (121); Nick Beard 4/54 (9.4 overs)

Otago won by 67 runs
Bert Sutcliffe Oval, Lincoln
Umpires: Tony Gillies and Wayne Knights

- Scotland won the toss and elected to field
- 12 players per side (11 batting, 11 fielding)

== United Arab Emirates matches ==
=== 1st match ===
12 September 2014
Scorecard

Western Australia; 245/9 (50 overs)	v	United Arab Emirates; 207 (46.5 overs)
Cameron Bancroft 119 (127); Manjula Guruge 6/30 (10 overs)		Mohammad Naveed 41 (30); David Moody 3/33 (6.5 overs)

Western Australia won by 38 runs
WACA, Perth
Umpires: Wayne Barron & Nathan Johnstone

- Western Australia won the toss and elected to bat

=== 2nd match ===
14 September 2014
Scorecard

United Arab Emirates; 210 (49.4 overs)	v	Western Australia; 211/1 (37.4 overs)
Shaiman Anwar 63 (62); Andrew Tye 4/29 (10 overs)		Marcus Harris 121 (112); Fayyaz Ahmed 1/51 (7.4 overs)

Western Australia won by 9 wickets
Murdoch University Ground, Perth
Umpires: Matthew Hall & Trent Steenholdt

- Western Australia won the toss and elected to field
- Western Australia innings: 1x5 ball over in 27th over

=== 3rd match ===
17 September 2014
Scorecard

Northern Territory; 202 (45 overs)	v	United Arab Emirates; 206/6 (43.4 overs)
Matthew Sampson-Barnes 73 (106); Kamran Shazad 3/24 (7 overs)		Amjad Ali 69 (84); Ben Turley (2/40 (10 overs)

United Arab Emirates won by 4 wickets
Marrara Oval, Darwin

- UAE won the toss and elected to field
- 12 players per side (11 batting, 11 fielding)
- Northern Territory innings: 1x5 ball over in 7th over

=== 4th match ===
18 September 2014
Scorecard

Papua New Guinea; 267/7 (50 overs)	v	United Arab Emirates; 271/3 (48.2 overs)
Tony Ura 73 (109); Nasir Aziz 3/35 (10 overs)		Saqib Ali 73 (87); Lega Siaka 2/29 (6 overs)

United Arab Emirates won by 7 wickets
Gardens Oval, Darwin

- UAE won the toss and elected to field
- 12 players per side (11 batting, 11 fielding)

=== 5th match ===
23 September 2014
Scorecard

South Australia; 271/8 (50 overs)	v	United Arab Emirates; 168 (45 overs)
Tim Ludeman 69 (80); Mohammad Shahzad 2/54 (10 overs)		Andri Berenger 34 (45); Daniel Worrall 3/15 (8 overs)

South Australia won by 103 runs
Marrara Oval, Darwin
Umpires: Craig Thomas and Mark Donfeld

- UAE won the toss and elected to field
- South Australia - 12 players (11 batting, 11 fielding); United Arab Emirates 13 players (11 batting, 11 fielding)

=== 6th match ===
25 September 2014
Scorecard

United Arab Emirates; 176 (43.4 overs)	v	South Australia; 178/8 (41.4 overs)
Andri Berenger 38 (71); Chadd Sayers 3/49 (10 overs)		Johan Botha 65 (86); Mohammad Naveed 4/26 (10 overs)

South Australia won by 2 wickets
Marrara Oval, Darwin
Umpires: Craig Thomas and Mark Donfeld

- UAE won the toss and elected to bat
- United Arab Emirates - 13 players (11 batting, 11 fielding); South Australia - 12 players (11 batting, 11 fielding)
