= List of Scotland national cricket captains =

This is a list of all cricketers who have captained Scotland in an official international match. This includes the ICC Trophy, Under-19 games and One Day Internationals, Twenty20 Internationals. The tables are correct as of the January 2012.

== One Day Internationals ==
Scotland played their first ODI on 16 May 1999.

Scottish ODI Captains
No.	Name	Span	Played	Won	Tied	Lost	NR
1	George Salmond	1999	5	0	0	5	0
2	Ryan Watson	2006-2007	16	2	0	11	3
3	Craig Wright	2006-2009	15	7	0	8	0
4	Gavin Hamilton	2009-2010	5	1	0	4	0
5	Gordon Drummond	2010-2013	16	9	0	7	0
6	Kyle Coetzer	2013–Present	31	16	1	14	0
7	Preston Mommsen	2013-2016	25	7	0	15	3
8	Richie Berrington	2018	2	0	0	2	0
Overall			115	42	1	66	6

== Twenty20 Internationals ==
Scotland played their first Twenty20 International against Kenya on 4 February 2010.

Scottish T20I Captains
No.	Name	Span	Played	Won	Tied	Lost	NR
1	Ryan Watson	2007-2008	6	2	0	3	1
2	Gavin Hamilton	2009-2010	6	0	0	6	0
3	Gordon Drummond	2012-2013	5	3	0	2	0
4	Kyle Coetzer	2012–Present	29	15	1	13	0
5	Preston Mommsen	2013-2016	17	9	0	6	2
6	Richie Berrington	2019	2	0	0	2	0
Overall			65	29	1	32	3

== ICC Trophy/ICC World Cup Qualifier ==
Scotland debuted in the ICC Trophy in the 1996/97 tournament.

Scottish ICC Trophy/ICC World Corld Qualifier Captains
No.	Name	Span	Played	Won	Tied	Lost	NR
1	George Salmond	1996/97–2001	19	13	0	5	1
2	Craig Wright	2005	7	7	0	0	0
3	Ryan Watson	2009	10	5	0	5	0
6	Kyle Coetzer	2014	2	1	0	1	0
7	Preston Mommsen	2010-2014	8	7	0	1	0
Overall			46	33	0	7	1

== Youth One-Day International captains ==
This is a list of Scottish cricketers who have captained their country in an Under-19's ODI.

Scottish Under 19's Captains
No.	Name	Span	Played	Won	Tied	Lost	NR
1	John Blain	1998	6	2	0	4	0
2	Robert More	2002	6	2	0	4	0
3	Kyle Coetzer	2004	5	2	0	3	0
4	Ian Young	2004	2	0	0	2	0
5	Kasim Farid	2006	5	0	0	5	0
6	Paddy Sadler	2012	6	2	4	0	0
7	Ross McLean	2014	6	3	0	3	0
Overall			'36	11	0	25	0

== Women's Captain ==
Scottish Women's Captain
No.	Name	Span	Played	Won	Tied	Lost	NR
1	Linda Spence	2001	5	1	0	4	0
2	Kari Anderson	2003	3	0	0	3	0
Overall			'8	1	0	7	0
