= List of Scotland ODI cricketers =

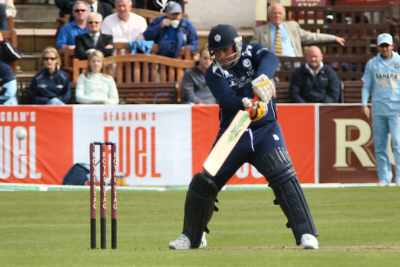
Ryan Watson plays through backward point against India at Glasgow's Titwood ground on 16 August 2007.

Since Scotland's first One Day International (ODI) in 1999, 90 players have represented the team. A One Day International (ODI) is an international cricket match between two representative teams, each having ODI status, as determined by the International Cricket Council (ICC). An ODI differs from Test matches in that the number of overs per team is limited, and that each team has only one innings. The list is arranged in the order in which each player won his first ODI cap. Where more than one player won his first ODI cap in the same match, those players are listed alphabetically by surname. Scotland played their first ODI matches at the 1999 Cricket World Cup. Since 1 January 2006, Scotland has had official ODI status, meaning that any one-day match it plays after that date against the Test-playing nations, or against another side with ODI status, is an official ODI. The ICC currently grants temporary ODI status to associate (non-Test) nations for four-year cycles based on performances at World Cup qualification events. Scotland retains official ODI status at least until the end of the 2018 Cricket World Cup Qualifier.

Scotland have played 185 ODIs, resulting in 87 victories, 87 defeats, 1 tie and 10 no results. At the 2007 World Cup, Scotland lost all three of their matches and failed to pass beyond the group stages. Scotland risk losing players to the county cricket system in England during the British summer, where teams representing 18 of the traditional counties of England compete.

George Munsey made the highest score for Scotland on 12 June 2025 when he scored 191 against the Netherlands. Josh Davey holds the records for the best bowling figures for Scotland in an ODI with 6/28 against Afghanistan on 14 January 2015. Richie Berrington is Scotland's leading run-scorer with 3,881 runs and Safyaan Sharif and Mark Watt share the record for most wickets in ODIs for Scotland with 119.

== Key ==
General

- ‡ – Captain
- † – Wicket-keeper
- First – Year of debut
- Last – Year of latest game
- Mat – Number of matches played
- Win% – Winning percentage

Batting

- Runs – Runs scored in career
- HS – Highest score
- Avg – Runs scored per dismissal
- * – Batsman remained not out
- 100 – Number of centuries scored
- 50 – Number of half centuries scored

Bowling

- Balls – Balls bowled in career
- Wkt – Wickets taken in career
- BBI – Best bowling in an innings
- Ave – Average runs per wicket
- 5WI – Five wickets or more in a match

Fielding

- Ca – Catches taken
- St – Stumpings taken

== Players ==
Statistics are correct as of 13 August 2026.

Scotland ODI cricketers
General					Batting					Bowling					Fielding		Ref
No.	Name	First	Last	Mat	Runs	HS	Avg	50	100	Balls	Wkt	BBI	Ave	5WI	Ca	St	Ref
1	Michael Allingham	1999	1999	3	11	6	3.66	0	0	–	–	–	–	–	1	0	
2	Asim Butt	1999	1999	5	23	11	5.75	0	0	222	4	2/24	37.00	0	0	0	
3	John Blain	1999	2009	33	284	41	14.94	0	0	1,329	41	5/22	28.60	1	8	0	
4	James Brinkley	1999	1999	5	52	23	10.40	0	0	168	2	1/29	58.50	0	1	0	
5	Alec Davies †	1999	1999	5	83	32	20.75	0	0	–	–	–	–	–	2	1	
6	Nick Dyer	1999	1999	5	3	2*	3.00	0	0	156	5	2/26	23.40	0	2	0	
7	Gavin Hamilton ‡†	1999	2010	38	1,231	119	35.17	7	2	220	3	2/36	53.33	0	6	1	
8	Bruce Patterson	1999	1999	3	10	10	3.33	0	0	–	–	–	–	–	0	0	
9	Ian Philip	1999	1999	3	20	17	6.66	0	0	–	–	–	–	–	4	0	
10	George Salmond ‡	1999	1999	5	57	31	11.40	0	0	–	–	–	–	–	1	0	
11	Mike Smith	1999	1999	5	19	13	3.80	0	0	–	–	–	–	–	0	0	
12	Ian Stanger	1999	2006	5	50	27	10.00	0	0	54	0	–	–	–	2	0	
13	Greig Williamson	1999	1999	2	11	10	5.50	0	0	–	–	–	–	–	0	0	
14	Paul Hoffmann	2006	2007	18	85	31	7.72	0	0	743	16	3/22	34.68	0	5	0	
15	Dougie Lockhart †	2006	2010	14	218	46	24.22	0	0	–	–	–	–	–	10	0	
16	Ross Lyons	2006	2010	25	90	28	22.50	0	0	1,093	20	3/21	45.05	0	4	0	
17	Neil McCallum	2006	2011	43	1,002	121*	27.83	4	2	–	–	–	–	–	13	0	
18	Neil MacRae	2006	2006	2	10	8	5.00	0	0	–	–	–	–	–	0	0	
19	Dewald Nel	2006	2010	19	31	11*	15.50	0	0	730	14	4/25	46.35	0	3	0	
20	Colin Smith †	2006	2009	27	432	59	19.63	2	0	–	–	–	–	–	22	11	
21	Ryan Watson ‡	2006	2010	35	956	123*	30.83	6	1	570	12	3/18	44.00	0	14	0	
22	Dougie Brown	2006	2007	16	220	50*	15.71	1	0	629	15	3/37	40.93	0	3	0	(Note: Dougie Brown played One Day International cricket for England. Only his record for Scotland is given above.)
23	Omer Hussain	2006	2010	8	63	17	9.00	0	0	–	–	–	–	–	1	0	
24	Navdeep Poonia	2006	2009	21	237	67	11.28	1	0	–	–	–	–	–	7	0	
25	Craig Wright ‡	2006	2009	20	240	37	16.00	0	0	861	29	4/29	22.86	0	1	0	
26	Fraser Watts	2006	2011	36	974	101	28.64	9	1	–	–	–	–	–	7	0	
27	Glenn Rogers	2006	2008	13	81	26	16.20	0	0	512	8	2/22	51.12	0	2	0	
28	Majid Haq	2006	2015	54	566	71	16.64	3	0	2,633	60	5/54	32.91	1	10	0	
29	Gordon Drummond ‡	2007	2013	30	240	35*	18.46	0	0	1,263	25	4/41	37.28	0	5	0	
30	Richie Berrington ‡	2008	2026	143	3,881	127	33.17	21	7	1,550	34	4/40	39.55	0	50	0	
31	Gordon Goudie	2008	2013	16	80	23	10.00	0	0	729	23	5/73	27.08	1	7	0	
32	Qasim Sheikh	2008	2010	7	63	23	10.50	0	0	–	–	–	–	–	2	0	
33	Kyle Coetzer ‡	2008	2023	89	3,192	156	38.92	21	5	270	2	1/17	126.50	0	26	0	
34	Calum MacLeod	2008	2022	88	3,026	175	38.30	13	10	968	11	2/26	76.00	0	53	0	
35	Moneeb Iqbal	2009	2014	13	192	63	24.00	1	0	270	4	2/35	67.50	0	1	0	
36	Jan Stander	2009	2012	5	44	22*	11.00	0	0	150	6	2/25	27.66	0	1	0	
37	Stuart Chalmers	2009	2009	2	9	9*	–	0	0	60	1	1/34	49.00	0	0	0	
38	Alasdair Evans	2009	2021	42	100	28	9.09	0	0	1,928	58	5/43	28.94	1	9	0	
39	Marc Petrie †	2009	2009	4	3	3	1.50	0	0	–	–	–	–	–	3	1	
40	Josh Davey	2010	2025	33	498	64	21.65	2	0	1,361	50	6/28	22.22	2	10	0	
41	Gregor Maiden †	2010	2011	7	84	31	21.00	0	0	48	0	–	–	–	5	0	
42	Preston Mommsen ‡	2010	2017	44	1,115	139*	30.97	6	2	132	6	3/26	21.66	0	22	0	
43	Matthew Parker	2010	2010	10	59	22	9.83	0	0	414	12	4/33	27.25	0	3	0	
44	Ollie Hairs	2010	2010	5	68	27	13.60	0	0	–	–	–	–	–	0	0	
45	Ryan Flannigan	2010	2010	1	0	0	0.00	0	0	–	–	–	–	–	0	0	
46	Safyaan Sharif	2011	2026	97	654	40*	19.81	0	0	4,392	122	5/33	30.13	2	22	0	
47	Craig Wallace †	2012	2022	32	574	58	21.25	4	0	–	–	–	–	–	17	2	
48	Matt Machan	2013	2016	23	734	114	33.36	3	1	402	9	3/31	42.66	0	4	0	
49	David Murphy †	2013	2013	8	58	20*	11.60	0	0	–	–	–	–	–	8	3	
50	Iain Wardlaw	2013	2015	22	21	7*	3.50	0	0	1,108	36	4/22	28.77	0	1	0	
51	Robert Taylor	2013	2016	15	154	46*	14.00	0	0	713	20	3/39	30.85	0	6	0	
52	Neil Carter	2013	2013	3	0	0	0.00	0	0	175	5	3/27	26.40	0	0	0	
53	Freddie Coleman	2013	2015	16	211	70	15.07	1	0	–	–	–	–	–	8	0	
54	Hamish Gardiner	2013	2015	11	262	96	23.81	2	0	–	–	–	–	–	4	0	
55	Matthew Cross ‡†	2014	2026	120	2,490	114	24.65	14	2	–	–	–	–	–	140	12	
56	Michael Leask	2014	2026	98	1,624	107*	26.19	8	1	2,894	74	4/24	32.95	0	40	0	
57	Brad Wheal	2016	2024	18	49	24	8.16	0	0	873	27	3/34	23.07	0	3	0	
58	Con de Lange	2016	2017	13	123	26*	20.50	0	0	546	16	5/60	23.18	1	7	0	
59	Ruaidhri Smith	2016	2016	2	10	10	10.00	0	0	90	1	1/31	97.00	0	0	0	
60	Chris Sole	2016	2023	30	71	17	6.45	0	0	1,490	53	4/27	23.67	0	9	0	
61	Mark Watt	2016	2026	92	932	66	21.67	2	0	4,732	121	5/33	28.00	1	31	0	
62	George Munsey	2017	2026	79	2,777	191	41.44	19	3	–	–	–	–	–	41	0	
63	Stuart Whittingham	2017	2019	5	7	3*	3.50	0	0	251	8	3/58	28.00	0	3	0	
64	Michael Jones	2018	2026	19	506	87	29.76	3	0	–	–	–	–	–	4	0	
65	Tom Sole	2018	2019	10	46	20	7.66	0	0	504	10	4/15	38.70	0	7	0	
66	Scott Cameron	2018	2018	2	9	8*	9.00	0	0	109	3	2/64	41.00	0	1	0	
67	Dylan Budge	2018	2022	17	248	46*	22.54	0	0	150	1	1/21	111.00	0	8	0	
68	Adrian Neill	2019	2023	9	29	14*	14.50	0	0	431	14	3/32	24.42	0	3	0	
69	Hamza Tahir	2019	2023	31	26	13	4.33	0	0	1,454	40	5/38	25.82	1	5	0	
70	Gavin Main	2019	2024	16	82	64*	82.00	1	0	716	34	5/52	18.11	1	8	0	
71	Christopher McBride	2022	2026	22	407	56	22.61	1	0	180	3	1/10	45.00	0	6	0	
72	Chris Greaves	2022	2025	30	381	56*	22.41	2	0	659	28	5/53	21.42	1	11	0	
73	Oliver Davidson	2022	2026	9	23	14	7.66	0	0	396	7	2/28	46.00	0	6	0	
74	Brandon McMullen	2022	2026	47	1,572	151	42.48	7	5	1,961	68	5/34	21.86	1	27	0	
75	Jack Jarvis	2023	2026	23	135	30	10.38	0	0	755	27	4/40	25.81	0	7	0	
76	Tom Mackintosh	2023	2023	10	169	38*	21.12	0	0	–	–	–	–	–	2	0	
77	Liam Naylor	2023	2025	2	34	20	17.00	0	0	–	–	–	–	–	0	0	
78	Brad Currie	2024	2026	17	16	8*	16.00	0	0	743	37	4/26	14.13	0	5	0	
79	Scott Currie	2024	2024	3	10	5	5.00	0	0	120	3	2/16	28.66	0	0	0	
80	Andrew Umeed	2024	2024	5	138	98*	46.00	1	0	–	–	–	–	–	1	0	
81	Charlie Tear†	2024	2025	20	489	80	30.56	4	0	–	–	–	–	–	5	0	
82	Jasper Davidson	2024	2026	10	47	24*	–	0	0	474	14	4/23	34.28	0	3	0	
83	Charlie Cassell	2024	2025	6	4	4	4.00	0	0	274	11	7/21	24.36	1	1	0	
84	Michael English	2024	2026	6	230	107	46.00	1	1	–	–	–	–	–	2	0	
85	Finlay McCreath	2025	2026	20	561	112	33.00	3	1	–	–	–	–	–	11	0	
86	Mackenzie Jones	2025	2026	3	9	99*	–	0	0	120	4	3/55	40.25	0	4	0	
87	Tom Bruce	2025	2025	2	33	22	33.00	0	0	–	–	–	–	–	1	0	
88	Ollie Jones	2026	2026	2	2	2	2.00	0	0	66	0	–	–	–	0	0	
89	Zainullah Ihsan	2026	2026	1	–	–	–	0	0	36	1	1/46	46.00	0	1	0	
90	Lyle Robertson	2026	2026	1	–	–	–	0	0	60	6	6/52	8.66	1	1	0	

== Captains ==
George Salmond was Scotland's first ODI captain, leading his team in the 1999 World Cup. In the intervening years between the World Cup and Scotland gaining ODI status in 2006, the captaincy had passed on to Craig Wright. After his team were knocked out of the 2007 World Cup in the first round, Wright resigned the captaincy. He was replaced by Ryan Watson. Watson said Wright was a hard act to follow and he intended "to pick up where Craig left off, bring in some of my own ideas and hopefully achieve the same level of success". Early in 2009, after Scotland failed to qualify for the 2011 World Cup, Watson stepped down as captain and was replaced by Gavin Hamilton.

Player	Dates of captaincy	Mat	Won	Lost	Tied	No result	% win (Note: Percentage is worked out by counting tied games as half a win and excluding no results from the equation.)
George Salmond	1999	5	0	5	0	0	0.00
Ryan Watson	2006–2009	16	2	11	0	3	15.38
Craig Wright	2006–2007	15	7	8	0	0	46.67
Gavin Hamilton	2009–2010	5	1	4	0	0	20.00
Gordon Drummond	2010–2013	16	9	7	0	0	56.25
Kyle Coetzer	2013–2014, 2016–2022	45	26	17	1	1	60.22
Preston Mommsen	2013–2016	25	7	15	0	3	31.81
Richie Berrington	2018, 2022–2026	53	32	18	0	3	64.00
Matthew Cross	2022–2022, 2025	5	3	2	0	0	60.00

== See also ==
- Scotland national cricket team
- List of Scotland Twenty20 International cricketers
