= Nick Dyer =

Scottish cricketer (born 1969)

Personal information
- Born: 10 September 1969 (age 55); Edinburgh, Scotland
- Batting: Right-handed
- Bowling: Right-arm offbreak
- Source: CricInfo, 19 April 2007

Nick Dyer (born 10 September 1969) is a Scottish former cricketer. He is a right-handed batsman and a right-arm offbreak bowler. He played in five One-Day Internationals in May 1999 and participated in List A cricket between 1997 and 1999. Dyer has played cricket for Haverfordwest Cricket Club in the Pembrokeshire Cricket League, helping them win the top Division in Pembrokeshire. He is also an outstanding squash player, having represented Wales at the Masters level and in the Welsh Premier Squash League.
