= Navdeep Poonia =

Scottish cricketer known for patient innings

Navdeep Singh Poonia
Personal information
- Full name: Navdeep Singh Poonia
- Born: 11 May 1986 (age 40); Glasgow, Scotland
- Batting: Right-handed
- Bowling: Right-arm medium-fast

International information
- National side: Scotland
- ODI debut (cap 24): 5 August 2006 v Ireland
- Last ODI: 22 August 2009 v Ireland
- T20I debut (cap 7): 12 September 2007 v Pakistan
- Last T20I: 10 February 2010 v Afghanistan

Domestic team information
- Years: Team
- 2002: Warwickshire Cricket Board
- 2006–2009: Warwickshire

Career statistics
Competition	ODI	T20I	FC	LA
Matches	21	8	14	42
Runs scored	237	95	557	732
Batting average	20.28	19.00	28.31	29.30
100s/50s	0/1	0/0	1/2	0/4
Top score	67	38*	111	79
Catches/stumpings	7/–	2/–	5/–	13/–
- Source: CricketArchive, 6 January 2010

Navdeep Singh Poonia (born 11 May 1986) is a Scottish cricket player. He is a right-handed batsman and right-arm medium fast bowler. He has played One Day Internationals for Scotland, and was selected for his country for the 2007 Cricket World Cup. He has also played for Warwickshire in English county cricket. Nav played for Pelsall Cricket Club and went onto play for Brewood Cricket Club, his current club in the South Staffordshire Premier League as of the 2023 season.

In the 2008 ICC World T20 Qualifier against Bermuda, Navdeep Poonia played the patient innings of unbeaten 38 off 54 balls without hitting even a single boundary or a six, which is also the longest ever T20I innings by any player without hitting a single six or a boundary. He's also the only player to record a 30+ score in T20I history without scoring a boundary or a six.
