= Robert Taylor (cricketer, born 1989) =

English cricketer

Personal information
- Full name: Robert Meadows Lombe Taylor
- Born: 21 December 1979 (age 46); Northampton, Northamptonshire, England
- Nickname: Bobby Tay-Tay, Tails
- Batting: Left-handed
- Bowling: Left-arm medium
- Role: Allrounder

International information
- National side: Scotland
- ODI debut (cap 51): 8 March 2013 v Afghanistan
- Last ODI: 26 January 2016 v Hong Kong
- ODI shirt no.: 42
- T20I debut (cap 37): 16 November 2013 v Afghanistan
- Last T20I: 12 March 2016 v Hong Kong

Domestic team information
- Years: Team
- 2010–2011: Loughborough MCCU
- 2011–2016: Leicestershire
- 2017–2018: Norfolk

Career statistics
Competition	ODI	T20I	FC	LA
Matches	15	9	44	50
Runs scored	154	85	1,461	687
Batting average	14.00	28.33	22.82	20.81
100s/50s	0/0	0/0	1/6	0/1
Top score	46*	41*	101*	62
Balls bowled	713	150	5,625	2,089
Wickets	20	5	90	67
Bowling average	30.85	39.20	41.01	29.13
5 wickets in innings	0	0	3	0
10 wickets in match	0	0	0	0
Best bowling	3/39	3/17	5/55	4/58
Catches/stumpings	6/–	8/–	22/–	18/–
- Source: CricketArchive, 28 August 2016

Robert Meadows Lombe Taylor (born 21 December 1989) is an English-born cricketer who played international cricket for Scotland. Taylor played as a left-handed batsman and bowled left-arm medium pace. He was born in Northampton, Northamptonshire. He has also been Head Coach of Lightning, Loughborough Lightning and of the women's cricket programme at Loughborough University.

== Early career ==
Taylor was educated at Harrow School, before attending Loughborough University to study for a degree in Sports Management. While at Loughborough University, he made his first-class debut for Loughborough MCCU against Kent in 2010.

== County career ==
He joined Leicestershire for the remainder of the 2011 season, making his debut for the county against Surrey in the County Championship, and making an impressive 70.

== International career ==
In September 2012, Taylor was selected by Scotland to be part of a tour group to South Africa in October 2012. Although born in Northampton, Taylor qualifies to play for Scotland by having a Scottish parent. He made his international debut for Scotland in an ODI against Afghanistan in Sharjah in 2013.

== Coaching career ==
Taylor was appointed Head Coach of Loughborough Lightning ahead of the 2018 season, leading them to the final of the competition in his first season. When English women's cricket was reformed ahead of the 2020 season, Taylor retained his coaching role in the East Midlands, becoming Head Coach of the new side Lightning. He has also been Head Coach of the Women's MCCU programme at Loughborough University. In 2021, he was appointed as Welsh Fire's bowling coach for The Hundred. At the end of the 2021 season, he left his Head Coach role at Lightning.
