= Richie Berrington =

Scottish cricketer (born 1987)

Personal information
- Full name: Richard Douglas Berrington
- Born: 3 April 1987 (age 39); Pretoria, Transvaal Province, South Africa
- Batting: Right-handed
- Bowling: Right-arm medium-fast
- Role: All-rounder

International information
- National side: Scotland (2008–present)
- ODI debut (cap 30): 2 July 2008 v Ireland
- Last ODI: 13 August 2026 v Canada
- ODI shirt no.: 44
- T20I debut (cap 21): 2 August 2008 v Ireland
- Last T20I: 17 April 2026 v Namibia
- T20I shirt no.: 44

Domestic team information
- Years: Team
- 2026: Glasgow Cosmic

Career statistics
Competition	ODI	T20I	FC	LA
Matches	143	108	20	211
Runs scored	3,881	2,504	844	5,420
Batting average	33.17	30.91	29.10	31.51
100s/50s	7/21	1/10	2/4	9/29
Top score	127	100	129	127
Balls bowled	1,550	518	1,206	2,727
Wickets	34	28	25	64
Bowling average	39.55	23.57	25.96	38.40
5 wickets in innings	0	0	0	0
10 wickets in match	0	0	0	0
Best bowling	4/40	3/17	3/13	4/40
Catches/stumpings	50/–	23/–	15/–	70/–
- Source: ESPNcricinfo, 15 August 2026

Richard Douglas Berrington (born 3 April 1987) is a Scottish cricketer. He played for Scotland in the 2006 Under-19 Cricket World Cup in Sri Lanka, and has since played first-class, One Day International, and List A cricket for Scotland. In June 2022, Berrington was named as the captain of the national team, after Kyle Coetzer stepped down from leading the side.

== Early life and youth career ==
Berrington was born in Pretoria, South Africa, but emigrated to Scotland as a child. Berrington played cricket for Scotland at a national level as a teenager, representing the country at every youth level from under-13s up to under-19s. He was so skilled that while he was still eligible to play under-17s cricket, he was already playing for Scotland's under-19 team. As an 18-year-old, he went to India as part of the European Cricket Council Development team, and he was also part of the International Cricket Council's first Winter Training Camp in Pretoria. Following this, he was part of Scotland's squad for the 2006 Under-19 Cricket World Cup in Sri Lanka.

== International career ==
Berrington progressed through the Scottish A team and then made his One Day International debut for Scotland against Ireland in July 2008, hitting the winning runs for Scotland. He played in his first Twenty20 International, also against Ireland, the next month. Berrington became a regular member of the Scottish team, being particularly effective in Twenty20s and first-class cricket, and he was part of their squad to play in the 2009 ICC World Twenty20. After being on a seasonal contract between April and September 2009, he became the sixth Scottish cricketer to be given a full-time contract with Cricket Scotland in March 2010 as part of Scotland's efforts to increase professionalism in their national team.

Berrington has scored centuries in a number of key matches for Scotland, but he was frustratingly inconsistent. In June 2010, in a match against India A, Berrington scored 106 to help Scotland recover from 7/64 to score the required 277 runs, causing a major upset. In July 2011, he scored 56 runs in just 23 balls in an ODI to help Scotland scale highest ever successful run chase, which years later Scottish captain Preston Mommsen would refer to as his most memorable innings. Next he scored 100 runs off 56 balls in a Twenty20 International on 24 July 2012 against Bangladesh, which Scotland won by 34 runs. This made Berrington just the seventh cricketer to score a century in a Twenty20 International, the first from an associate nation, and it gave Scotland their first ever win against a full member of the ICC. Berrington's ton won the match almost single-handedly for Scotland, as none of the other Scottish batsmen scored more than 19 runs. He scored his maiden century in ODIs against Ireland in September 2014, ensuring his place in Scotland's team for the 2015 Cricket World Cup, albeit in a losing cause.

In Scotland's opening match of the 2015 World Cup against host nation New Zealand, Berrington scored 50 runs as part of a large partnership with Matt Machan, who also scored a half-century, but it was the only substantial partnership of the innings and Scotland were bowled out for 142, which New Zealand chased down with more than half of their overs remaining. This was Berrington's highest score of the World Cup. While bowling during Scotland's group match against Sri Lanka, Berrington's shoe disintegrated as he took his delivery stride in one ball.

In a 2016 ODI match against the United Arab Emirates, Berrington passed 1,000 ODI runs. In the same match, Preston Mommsen and Kyle Coetzer both passed 1,000 runs as well. Previously, only two Scottish cricketers had achieved this milestone. In January 2017, Berrington and Calum MacLeod were part of a record 127-run partnership, the highest ever T20I partnership for Scotland, in a match against Hong Kong, with Berrington's orthodox style combining well with MacLeod's unorthodox strokeplay. He made his career-best List A score of 110 against Namibia in June 2017. Berrington also captained his first international matches for Scotland in January 2018 during the 2017–18 United Arab Emirates Tri-Nation Series. Scottish captain Kyle Coetzer was unavailable for the first two matches as he was completing coaching qualifications, so Berrington stood in as captain for Scotland's first two matches against Ireland.

Berrington played for Scotland in the 2018 Cricket World Cup Qualifier. He scored a half-century in Scotland's opening-day upset win against Afghanistan as part of a national record 208-run third-wicket partnership with Calum MacLeod, and he scored 47 runs in Scotland's thrilling tie with Zimbabwe. In Scotland's final match, with Scotland needing to beat the West Indies to qualify for the 2019 Cricket World Cup, Berrington was controversially dismissed leg before wicket. Replays showed that the ball hit Berrington outside the line of off stump, meaning he should not have been given out. As the tournament was not making use of the Umpire Decision Review System to save on costs, Scotland were unable to challenge the call. Scotland lost by just four runs under the Duckworth–Lewis–Stern method, but had they lost one less wicket they would have won.

In September 2019, he was named in Scotland's squad for the 2019 ICC T20 World Cup Qualifier tournament in the United Arab Emirates. In November 2020, Berrington was nominated for the ICC Men's Associate Cricketer of the Decade award.

In September 2021, Berrington was named the vice-captain of Scotland's provisional squad for the 2021 ICC Men's T20 World Cup.

In December 2022, Berrington became the first player to make 100 ODI appearances for Scotland.

On 28 July 2023, he joined the small group of T20I players to have scored over 2,000 runs in their T20I career.

In May 2024, he was named the captain in Scotland's squad for the 2024 ICC Men's T20 World Cup tournament.

On 20 July 2024, Berrington passed 3,000 one-day international career runs while scoring 79 not out in a rain-affected 47 run win over Namibia in a World Cup League 2 match in Dundee.

On 16 May 2025, Berrington scored 105 off 86 deliveries against the Netherlands, his 5th ODI century. His knock helped Scotland to a record total of 380/9.

On 8 June 2025, Berrington scored his 6th ODI century and 2nd in under a month scoring 102 off 114 balls helping Scotland to a narrow 2 run win against Nepal.

== Twenty20 franchise cricket ==
In June 2019, he was selected to play for the Edmonton Royals franchise team in the 2019 Global T20 Canada tournament. In July 2019, he was selected to play for the Glasgow Giants in the inaugural edition of the Euro T20 Slam cricket tournament. However, the following month the tournament was cancelled.
