= Gavin Hamilton (cricketer) =

Scottish former cricketer

Personal information
- Full name: Gavin Mark Hamilton
- Born: 16 September 1974 (age 52); Broxburn, West Lothian, Scotland
- Batting: Left-handed
- Bowling: Right-arm medium-fast
- Role: All-rounder

International information
- National sides: Scotland (1999–2009); England (1999)
- Only Test (cap 599): 25 November 1999; England v South Africa
- ODI debut (cap 7): 16 May 1999; Scotland v Australia
- Last ODI: 17 August 2010; Scotland v Afghanistan
- ODI shirt no.: 37
- T20I debut (cap 3): 12 September 2007; Scotland v Pakistan
- Last T20I: 11 February 2010; Scotland v Ireland

Domestic team information
- Years: Team
- 1993–2010: Scotland
- 2004–2005: Durham
- 1994–2003: Yorkshire

Career statistics
Competition	Test	ODI	FC	LA
Matches	1	38	95	211
Runs scored	0	1,231	2,939	4,209
Batting average	0.00	35.17	26.24	28.24
100s/50s	0/0	2/7	2/18	4/22
Top score	0	119	125	131
Balls bowled	90	220	12,348	4,124
Wickets	0	3	249	128
Bowling average	–	53.33	25.76	25.21
5 wickets in innings	–	0	9	2
10 wickets in match	–	0	2	0
Best bowling	–	2/36	7/50	5/16
Catches/stumpings	0/–	6/1	34/0	43/1
- Source: CricketArchive, 30 August 2011

Gavin Mark Hamilton (born 16 September 1974) is a Scottish former cricketer who played One Day Internationals and Twenty20 Internationals for Scotland and one Test match for England.

== Life and career ==
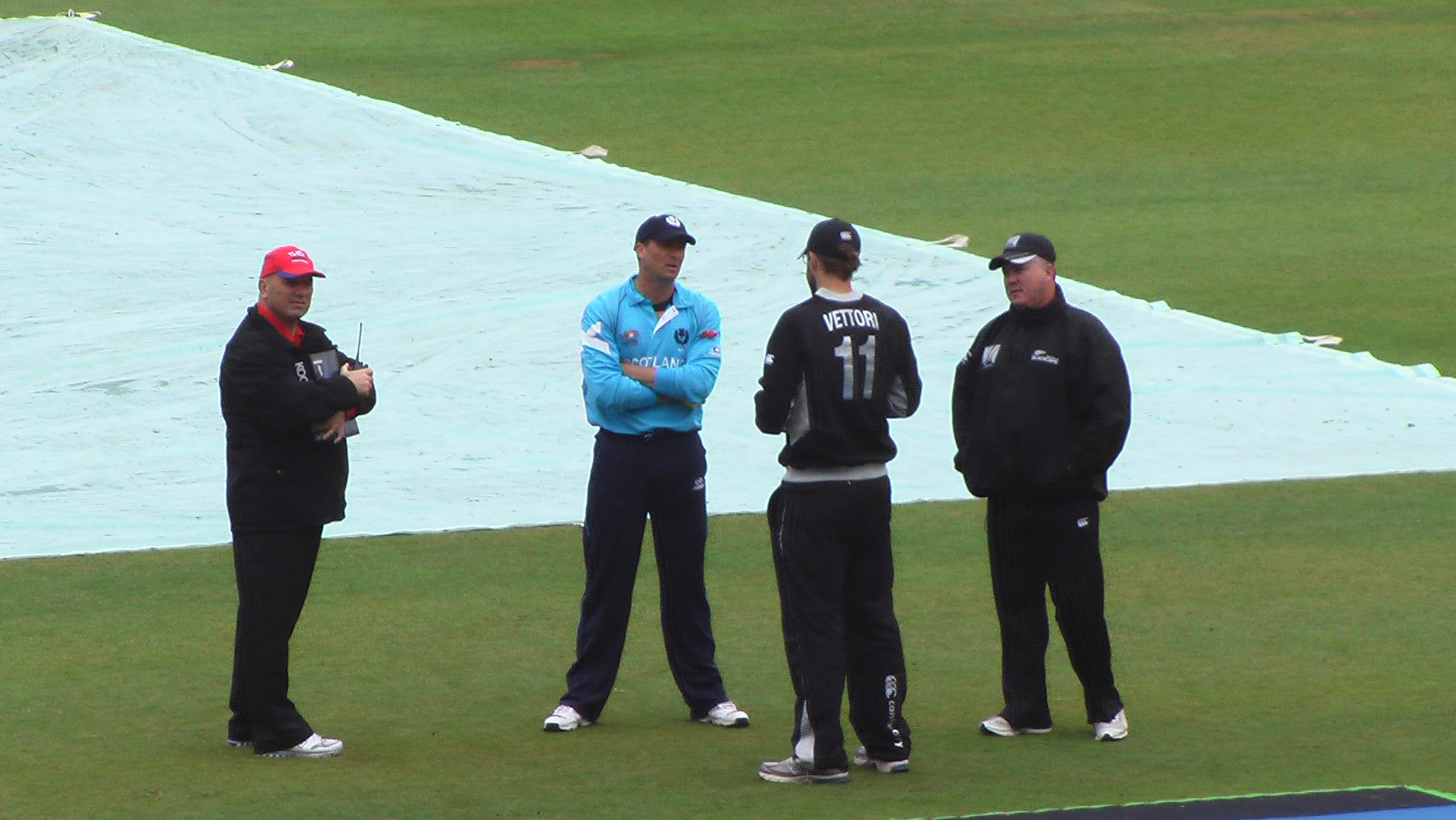
Hamilton and Daniel Vettori during a rain delay in the Scotland-New Zealand match of the 2009 ICC World Twenty20

He began his senior career in 1993, taking 5–65 in the first innings of his first-class debut, Scotland's annual game against Ireland. He also played a few times that year for Yorkshire's Second XI, making his first-team debut for the county in 1994. He took a few years to become established in the side, but by 1998 was an important team member: that summer he took 59 first-class wickets at 20.54 as well as scoring six fifties, and claimed 34 one-day scalps at 18.94.

In 1999, Hamilton represented Scotland in the 1999 World Cup. His place in the squad was announced late, as there had been a possibility that England would select him for their own World Cup squad, but when this did not happen he was free to play for Scotland. He rose to the occasion well, scoring 217 runs in his five One Day Internationals and holding the innings together on several occasions.

In 1999–00 England toured South Africa, and this time, Hamilton was included, his World Cup performances for Scotland having impressed the selectors. He played in the first Test at Johannesburg but had a nightmare match as England slumped to an innings defeat: scoring a pair and taking 0–63 with the ball. He was dropped for the second Test and never played for England again.

Hamilton's appearance in England's cause had been brief indeed, but was also to prove costly to him personally, as it meant that he would have to re-qualify to play for Scotland, a process that would take four years. Meanwhile, his domestic form, still good in 2000 as he scored his first century (against Hampshire) fell away to such an extent that in 2002 and 2003 combined he played a total of just six first-team games for Yorkshire.

Joining Durham for 2004, he gradually made his way back into the reckoning, with an unspectacular yet steady season. Having once again become available for Scotland in January, he was immediately recalled to the national team and in November of that year he played exclusively as a batsman in the ICC Intercontinental Cup final against Canada in Sharjah, making 115 as Scotland won by an innings. In 2005 Hamilton appeared a few times for Durham in the totesport League before being loaned to play for the Scottish Saltires in the same competition later in the year.

Hamilton was released from his contract with Durham at the end of the 2005 season and continued to combine his work with Caledonian Breweries with playing for Scotland and the Scottish Saltires. In 2008, while playing against Ireland Hamilton scored his maiden One Day International century. After Scotland's poor performance in the 2009 ICC World Cup Qualifiers, Hamilton was appointed captain of the Scottish One Day International team in April 2009, replacing Ryan Watson. Later, in July 2009, in his first match as Scottish captain, while playing against Canada, Hamilton scored his second One Day International century, although in the end Scotland went on to lose the match. The following day, however, Hamilton scored a half-century and led Scotland to victory to square the two match series 1–1.

In August 2010, Hamilton announced his retirement from the Scotland team.

Hamilton was appointed as general manager of cricket at Yorkshire in September 2024.

== See also ==
- One Test Wonder
- List of cricketers who have played for more than one international team
- List of Test cricketers born in non-Test playing nations
