= Preston Mommsen =

Scottish cricketer (born 1987)

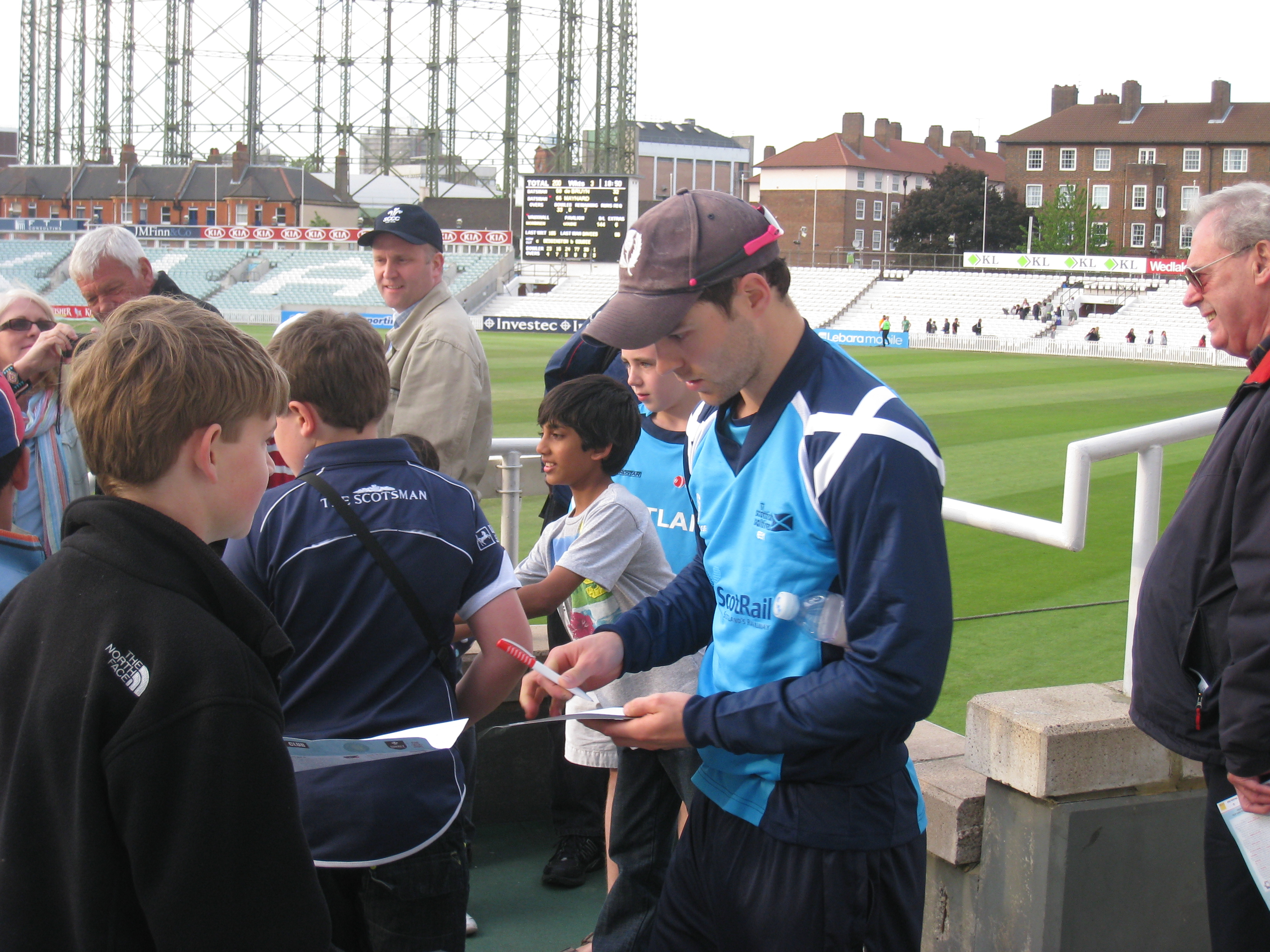

Personal information
- Full name: Preston Luke Mommsen
- Born: 14 October 1987 (age 39); Durban, Natal, South Africa
- Nickname: The Heat, P, The Pitbull
- Batting: Right-handed
- Bowling: Right-arm off break

International information
- National side: Scotland (2010–2017)
- ODI debut (cap 42): 15 June 2010 v Netherlands
- Last ODI: 17 June 2017 v Zimbabwe
- ODI shirt no.: 1
- T20I debut (cap 23): 13 March 2012 v Kenya
- Last T20I: 12 March 2016 v Hong Kong

Domestic team information
- Years: Team
- 2012: Leicestershire

Career statistics
Competition	ODI	T20I	FC	LA
Matches	44	24	13	98
Runs scored	1,115	419	395	2,655
Batting average	30.97	34.91	18.80	36.87
100s/50s	2/6	0/2	1/1	3/13
Top score	139*	68*	102	139*
Balls bowled	132	138	252	632
Wickets	6	4	4	19
Bowling average	21.66	41.00	42.50	33.47
5 wickets in innings	0	0	0	0
10 wickets in match	0	0	0	0
Best bowling	3/26	1/23	3/67	3/26
Catches/stumpings	22/–	11/–	22/–	52/–
- Source: CricketArchive, 17 June 2017

Preston Luke Mommsen (born 14 October 1987) is a South African-born Scottish cricketer and former captain in international limited over formats. Having represented South Africa at under 19 level he played his first game for Scotland in a first class match against the Netherlands on 10 June 2010.

On 21 November 2016, Mommsen announced his retirement from professional cricket to take up an "attractive opportunity in the corporate world", but returned to the Scotland squad in June 2017.

== Education ==
Mommsen attended Durban Preparatory High School for primary school, before finishing his basic education at Hilton College. Here he was not only a member of the 1st XI cricket team but also of the 1st XV rugby team and went on to represent South Africa School Boys for both sports. In 2006 Preston went on a cricket and rugby scholarship to Gordonstoun School in Moray, Scotland for the summer and winter terms. During this time he became the first school boy to score 1000 runs in that season. It was while he was at Gordonstoun that he got the chance to play for Kent 2nds.

== Cricketing career ==
=== Early career ===
Mommsen had a brief spell at Kent but only managed to make two appearances for the county's 2nd team. After leaving Gordonstoun (attended by HRH Prince Charles, Zara Phillips & Peter Phillips), Preston moved permanently to Scotland, living in Edinburgh. It was here that he started playing for Heriot’s CC, then Carlton, and now makes the odd appearance for Grange CC. After four years living in Edinburgh he qualified for the Scottish National Team and was subsequently called up in June 2010 after impressing at club level.

=== 2011 Season ===
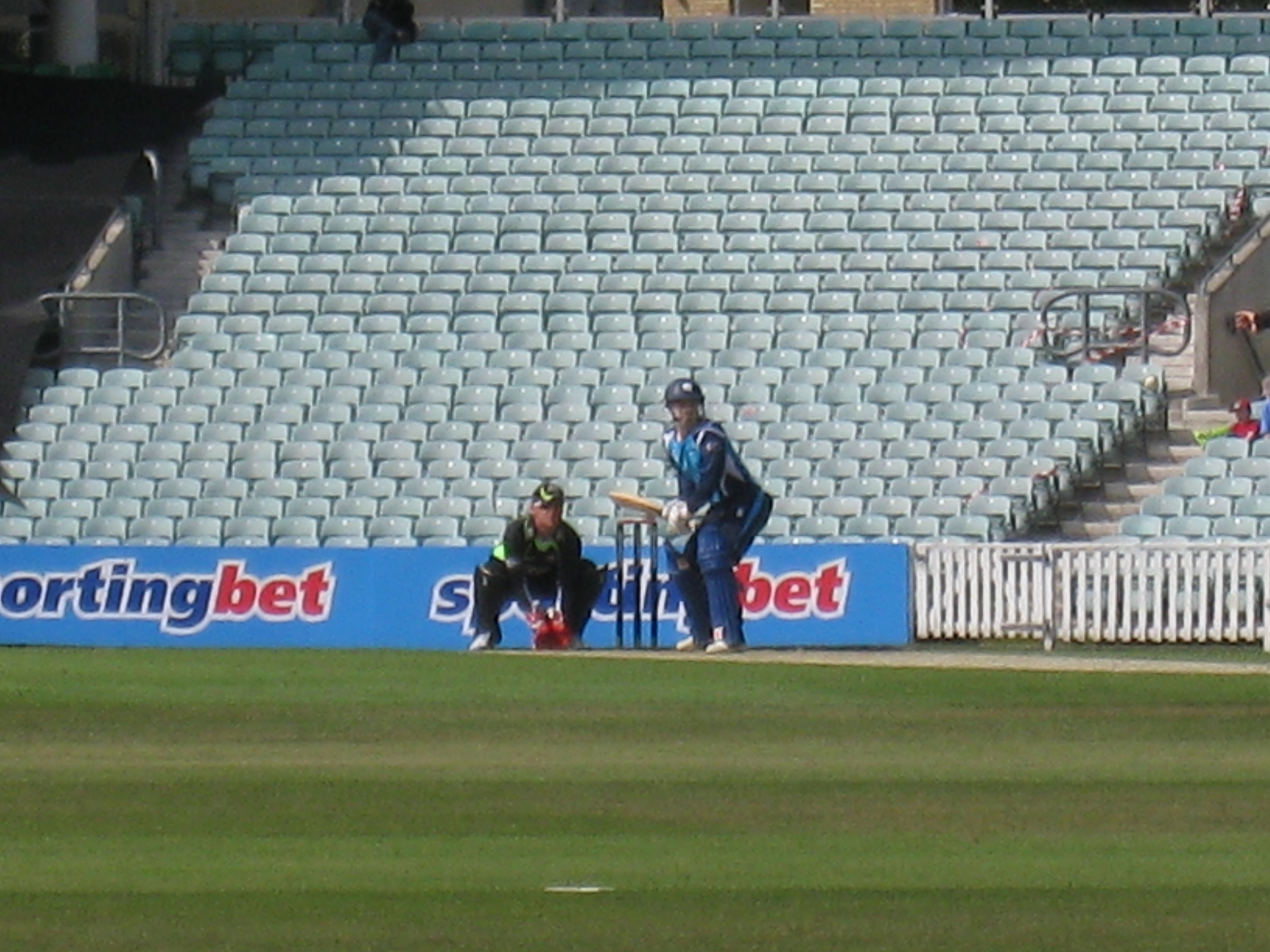
Mommsen batting for Scotland against Surrey in the CB40

The 2011 Season is the first full season Mommsen has been eligible for Scotland. As such he was selected in Scotland's CB40 squad and got off to a good start with two 50's and an average of 62.2 after the first 7 games of the season. Mommsen went on to finish the season with 408 runs at an average of 58.28 in the competition. As a result of his form, Scotland offered a full-time contract for the following year and he spent time at both Kent and Northamptonshire who were interested in signing him.

=== 2011/12 Winter ===
Having signed a full-time contract with Scotland, Mommsen has been included in their winter tours of Namibia and India, where in the latter Scotland start their campaign to qualify for the 2012 World Twenty20. He marked the occasion with his first international hundred scoring 102 off 192 balls in the first 4-day game against Namibia in Windhoek.

=== 2013 Season ===
In June 2013, Mommsen has been named as captain of a youthful Scotland squad to take on Australia A in a first-class four-day fixture in Edinburgh.

Cricket Scotland named him replacement to Scotland Captain Kyle Coetzer took over at Grange Cricket Club in Edinburgh.

Mommsen was ruled out of Scotland's 2013 World T20 qualifying campaign in a blow to their chances of winning a place in Bangladesh in March 2014. He had a pelvis injury and wasn't able to join his squad for the qualifiers in the UAE.

=== ICC World Cup Qualifiers ===
Mommsen went on to guide the innings at No.4, reaching a maiden List A ton as Hong Kong managed to hold on to a 17-run victory over Scotland at Queenstown Events Centre bringing a losing start for Scotland's World Cup Qualifiers.

Mommsen's ninth List-A fifty set up Scotland's 52-run win. Mommsen struck 94, and put up stands of 65 and 86 for the third and fourth wickets with Matty Cross and Freddie Coleman respectively as the team eventually piled on 288 for 9 from their 50 overs against Papua New Guinea at Bert Sutcliffe Oval in Lincoln, New Zealand.

He was stand-in captain against Kenya match where Mommsen took his time getting set striking only one four on his way to a half-century off 81 balls as Scotland clinched their third World Cup berth in dramatic fashion with a tense three-wicket win over Kenya with three balls to spare at Hagley Oval.

Mommsen led Scotland into Group A for the World Cup as his second century of the tournament secured an emphatic 41-run win over UAE in the final of the qualifiers.
