= Freddie Coleman =

Scottish cricketer (born 1991)

Personal information
- Full name: Freddie Robert John Coleman
- Born: 15 December 1991 (age 34); Edinburgh, Scotland
- Height: 6 ft 0 in (1.83 m)
- Batting: Right-handed
- Bowling: Under- Armoff spin
- Role: Batsman

International information
- National side: Scotland (2010–2015)
- ODI debut (cap 53): 30 June 2013 v Kenya
- Last ODI: 14 March 2015 v Australia
- Only T20I (cap 33): 4 July 2013 v Kenya

Domestic team information
- Years: Team
- 2013–2016: Warwickshire (squad no. 21)
- 2013–2014: Oxford MCCU

Career statistics
Competition	ODI	T20I	FC	LA
Matches	16	1	9	40
Runs scored	211	9	224	745
Batting average	15.07	9.00	14.93	21.91
100s/50s	0/1	0/0	1/0	0/5
Top score	70	9	110	70
Catches/stumpings	8/–	0/–	6/–	12/–
- Source: CricketArchive, 29 March 2018

Freddie Robert John Coleman (born 15 December 1991 in Edinburgh) is a Scottish cricketer who played for Warwickshire County Cricket Club and Scotland.

Coleman signed for Warwickshire in March 2013 after graduating from the county's Academy. He was released in June 2016 at the end of his contract.

Coleman made his One Day International debut for Scotland against Kenya on 30 June 2013.
