= Josh Davey =

Scottish cricketer (born 1990)

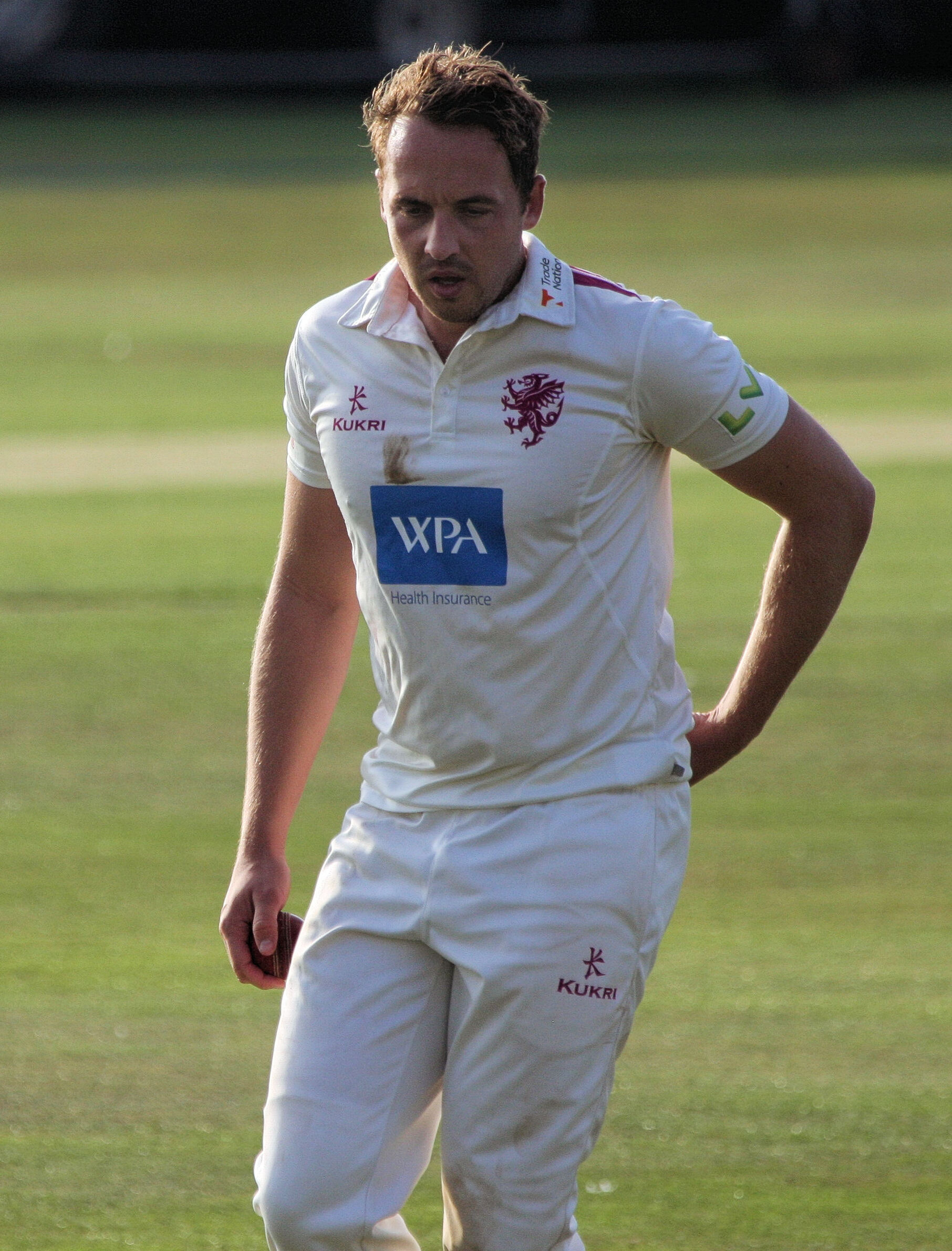

Personal information
- Full name: Joshua Henry Davey
- Born: 3 August 1990 (age 36); Aberdeen, Scotland
- Batting: Right-handed
- Bowling: Right-arm medium-fast
- Role: All-rounder

International information
- National side: Scotland (2010–present)
- ODI debut (cap 40): 15 June 2010 v Netherlands
- Last ODI: 4 September 2025 v Namibia
- ODI shirt no.: 38
- T20I debut (cap 28): 24 July 2012 v Bangladesh
- Last T20I: 21 October 2022 v Zimbabwe
- T20I shirt no.: 38

Domestic team information
- Years: Team
- 2010–2013: Middlesex (squad no. 24)
- 2013: → Hampshire (on loan)
- 2014–2025: Somerset (squad no. 38)
- 2023: → Leicestershire (on loan)
- 2026: Leicestershire (squad no. 38)

Career statistics
Competition	ODI	T20I	FC	LA
Matches	33	31	90	104
Runs scored	498	115	1,983	1,318
Batting average	21.65	14.37	20.23	23.12
100s/50s	0/2	0/0	0/6	0/6
Top score	64	24	75*	91
Balls bowled	1,361	653	11,414	3,942
Wickets	50	37	231	132
Bowling average	22.22	23.97	24.80	26.19
5 wickets in innings	2	0	4	2
10 wickets in match	0	0	0	0
Best bowling	6/28	4/18	5/21	6/28
Catches/stumpings	10/–	15/–	26/–	28/–
- Source: CricInfo, 26 September 2026

Joshua Henry Davey (born 3 August 1990) is a Scottish cricketer, who plays for Leicestershire County Cricket Club having previously played for Middlesex and Somerset as well as representing his country in One Day Internationals (ODIs) and Twenty20 Internationals. He is a right-handed batsman and right-arm medium pace bowler. He was educated at South Lee Prep School and then Culford School, in Suffolk.

== County career ==
In April 2010, Davey made his county debut for Middlesex against Northamptonshire in the Clydesdale Bank 40 competition. He made his first-class debut a month later against Oxford University Cricket Club, he scored two fifties in the match and shared an opening partnership of 192 with Sam Robson in the first innings.

Davey joined Somerset in 2014, going on to spend 11 years at the club and making more than 150 appearances across all formats.

In August 2025, it was announced that Davey had agreed a three-year contract to join Leicestershire from 1 November that year.

== International career ==
On 15 June 2010, Davey made his ODI debut against the Netherlands. Opening the batting, he scored 24 and coming on as first change took 1/27 from seven overs. In his fourth ODI, he returned figures of 5/9 in 7.2 overs against Afghanistan. This is the best bowling analysis for Scotland in ODIs.

On 14 January 2015, Davey added his name to the list of outstanding all round performances in an ODI by scoring 53 not out and picking 6 wickets for 28 runs against Afghanistan at Sheikh Zayed Stadium, Abu Dhabi in a triangular series which also involved Ireland.

In September 2019, he was named in Scotland's squad for the 2019 ICC T20 World Cup Qualifier tournament in the United Arab Emirates. In September 2021, Davey was named in Scotland's provisional squad for the 2021 ICC Men's T20 World Cup.
