= Matthew Cross (cricketer) =

Scottish cricketer (born 1992)

Personal information
- Full name: Matthew Henry Cross
- Born: 15 October 1992 (age 34); Aberdeen, Scotland
- Batting: Right-handed
- Role: Wicket keeper batter

International information
- National side: Scotland (2013–present)
- ODI debut (cap 55): 23 January 2014 v Canada
- Last ODI: 13 August 2026 v Canada
- T20I debut (cap 34): 4 July 2013 v Kenya
- Last T20I: 18 April 2026 v Namibia

Domestic team information
- Years: Team
- 2013–2014: Nottinghamshire
- 2013: Loughborough MCCU
- 2016: Essex
- 2026: Glasgow Cosmic

Career statistics
Competition	ODI	T20I	FC	LA
Matches	120	89	9	150
Runs scored	2,490	1,439	161	3,098
Batting average	24.65	23.20	14.63	24.58
100s/50s	2/14	0/5	0/0	2/17
Top score	114	66*	30	114
Catches/stumpings	140/12	49/16	21/0	169/19
- Source: Cricinfo, 15 August 2026

Matthew Henry Cross (born 15 October 1992) is a Scottish cricketer. He is a right-handed wicket-keeper batter and plays for Scotland national cricket team.

Born in Aberdeen, Cross played cricket and football during his early years. He became part of the Scotland cricket set-up in the junior age group and progressed up the ranks. He served as the vice-captain of the Scotland national under-19 cricket team in the 2012 Under-19 Cricket World Cup.

Cross made his international debut for the Scotland men's team next year in a T20 international against Kenya. Later, he made his One Day International debut against Canada in January 2014. Since then, he has represented the Scottish team in more than 175 international matches, and scored more than 3,000 runs. He was part of the Scotland squad for the 2021 and 2024 ICC Men's T20 World Cup.

== Early life ==
Matthew Cross was born in Aberdeen, Scotland on 15 October 1992. He played underage cricket and football during his school years. He became part of the Scotland cricket set-up in the junior age group. He played for Aberdeenshire Cricket Club at the age of nine. While studying engineering at Loughborough University, he represented the university team and rose up the ranks amongst the Scottish junior cricket teams.

Cross served as the vice-captain of the Scotland national under-19 cricket team in the 2012 Under-19 Cricket World Cup.

== Domestic career ==
In 2013, Cross signed on to play for Nottinghamshire in the English county cricket. However, he played just one match for the team, scoring 47 runs against Bangladesh A in a tour match. He represented the Nottinghamshire second XI and made his debut against Hampshire in the 2013 YB40 match staged at the Ageas Bowl. He became part of the Young Cricketers Programme run by Marylebone Cricket Club at Lord's.

== International career ==
In 2013, Cross got an opportunity with the Scotland squad. He was selected to represent the Twenty20 squad in the 2013 World Twenty20 Qualifier held in the United Arab Emirates. However, Cross did not make it to the starting XI in the tournament. He made his international debut against Kenya in a T20 match held in his home town Aberdeen on 4 July 2013. He made his One day international debut against Canada in a 2014 Cricket World Cup Qualifier match in January 2014. A week later, he recorded his first fifty plus score in his second ODI match against Kenya.

Since his debut, Cross started consistently representing the Scottish team in international matches. He scored his maiden half-century in T20Is against Ireland on 18 June 2015. Cross scored his maiden international century against UAE at Dubai on 21 January 2018. His only other international hundred came against the same opponents in March 2018. In June 2019, he was selected to play for the Montreal Tigers franchise team in the 2019 Global T20 Canada tournament. In July 2019, he was selected to play for the Glasgow Giants in the inaugural edition of the Euro T20 Slam cricket tournament. However, the following month the tournament was cancelled.

Cross was named in Scotland's squad for the 2019 ICC T20 World Cup Qualifier tournament in the United Arab Emirates. In September 2021, Cross was named in Scotland's provisional squad for the 2021 ICC Men's T20 World Cup. At the World Cup, Cross made just 32 runs across three innings as Scotland lost two of the three matches and crashed out of the competition in the preliminary stage. In May 2024, he was named in Scotland's squad for the 2024 ICC Men's T20 World Cup tournament. In the 2024 edition, Scott made 33 runs in three innings, while Scotland won two matches.
