= Matt Machan =

Cricketer

Personal information
- Full name: Matthew William Machan
- Born: 15 February 1991 (age 35); Brighton, Sussex, England
- Batting: Left-handed
- Bowling: Right-arm off break
- Role: Top order batsman

International information
- National side: Scotland (2013–2016)
- ODI debut (cap 48): 6 March 2013 v Afghanistan
- Last ODI: 26 January 2016 v Hong Kong
- ODI shirt no.: 14
- T20I debut (cap 30): 3 March 2013 v Afghanistan
- Last T20I: 12 March 2016 v Hong Kong

Domestic team information
- Years: Team
- 2010–2017: Sussex (squad no. 15)

Career statistics
Competition	ODI	T20I	FC	LA
Matches	23	13	44	58
Runs scored	734	407	2,089	1,810
Batting average	33.36	40.70	33.15	35.49
100s/50s	1/3	0/3	5/6	2/9
Top score	114	67*	192	126*
Balls bowled	402	135	132	640
Wickets	9	5	1	12
Bowling average	42.66	31.20	103.00	51.75
5 wickets in innings	0	0	0	0
10 wickets in match	0	0	0	0
Best bowling	3/31	3/23	1/36	3/31
Catches/stumpings	4/–	7/–	18/–	16/–
- Source: , 28 August 2016

Matthew William Machan (born 15 February 1991) is an English-born former cricketer who played for Sussex and Scotland. Machan was a left-handed batsman who bowled right-arm off break. He was born in Brighton, Sussex and educated at Hurstpierpoint College and Brighton College. Machan currently plays for Brighton and Hove CC in the Sussex Premier League.

== Domestic career ==
Having played for the Sussex Second XI since 2006, Machan made his full debut for Sussex in a first-class match against Cambridge MCCU. He made two further first-class appearances in the 2011 season against Oxford MCCU and Nottinghamshire in the County Championship. In the match against Oxford MCCU, Machan narrowly missed out on a maiden first-class century when he was dismissed on 99 by Alex Scott.

His List A debut came in 2010 against the touring Bangladeshis, with Machan scoring 10 runs before being dismissed by Mashrafe Mortaza, in what was a 149 run victory for Sussex. His second List A appearance came in 2011 against the touring Indians. In this match Machan scored his maiden half century in that format, making 56 runs before being caught and bowled by Suresh Raina.

In July 2017, Machan announced his retirement from professional cricket due to a wrist injury.

== International career ==
In September 2012, Machan was selected by Scotland to be part of a tour group to South Africa in October 2012.

Although born in Brighton (in England), Machan qualifies to play for Scotland by having a Scottish parent.

Machan was included in the 2016 ICC World Twenty20 Scotland squad, and played in the first round. Scotland lost two matches and won only one match, and were eliminated from the tournament. Machan was the player of the match in Scotland's only win, against Hong Kong. This win is their first win in an ICC Major tournament.
