= 2024 United Arab Emirates Tri-Nation Series =

Second tri-nation series round in 2024-26 WCL2

The 2024 United Arab Emirates Tri-Nation Series was the second round of the 2024–2026 Cricket World Cup League 2 cricket tournament that took place in the UAE in February and March 2024. The tri-nation series was contested by the men's national teams of UAE, Scotland and Canada. The matches were played as One Day International (ODI) fixtures.

Following the tri-series, UAE and Scotland contested a three-match Twenty20 International (T20I) series. Scotland won the series 2–1.

== Tour matches ==
Scotland and Canada played warm-up matches against the United Arab Emirates Falcons before the League 2 fixtures.

24 February 2024
10:00
Scorecard

Scotland; 206 (48.1 overs)	v	United Arab Emirates Falcons; 207/7 (40.1 overs)
Scott Currie 45 (51); Sanchit Sharma 5/40 (10 overs)		Asif Khan 87 (73); Hamza Tahir 3/41 (8.1 overs)

United Arab Emirates Falcons won by 3 wickets
Dubai International Cricket Stadium, Dubai
Umpires: Giby Alex (Ind) and Suneej Thottathil (UAE)
Player of the match: Sanchit Sharma (UAE Falcons)

- Scotland won the toss and elected to bat.

25 February 2024
10:00
Scorecard

United Arab Emirates Falcons; 241/9 (50 overs)	v	Canada; 245/5 (47.1 overs)
Rahul Chopra 56 (66); Dillon Heyliger 3/35 (8 overs)		Shreyas Movva 62* (63); Omid Shafi Rahman 2/42 (8 overs)

Canada won by 5 wickets
Dubai International Cricket Stadium, Dubai
Umpires: Asif Billa (UAE) and Tahseen Zaidi (UAE)
Player of the match: Saad Bin Zafar (Can)

- United Arab Emirates Falcons won the toss and elected to bat.

26 February 2024
10:30
Scorecard

United Arab Emirates Falcons; 225 (49 overs)	v	Scotland; 226/8 (47.3 overs)
Chundangapoyil Rizwan 67 (77); Brad Wheal 3/25 (5 overs)		Michael Leask 92* (92); Rahul Bhatia 4/26 (7 overs)

Scotland won by 2 wickets
Dubai International Cricket Stadium, Dubai
Umpires: Kashif Billa (UAE) and Waqar Latif (UAE)
Player of the match: Michael Leask (Sco)

- United Arab Emirates Falcons won the toss and elected to bat.

== League 2 series ==
2024 United Arab Emirates Tri-Nation Series
- Part of 2024–2026 Cricket World Cup League 2
- Date: 28 February – 9 March 2024
Teams
Canada	Scotland	United Arab Emirates
Captains
Saad Bin Zafar	Richie Berrington	Muhammad Waseem
Most runs
Harsh Thaker (234)	George Munsey (141)	Aayan Afzal Khan (95)
Most wickets
Dillon Heyliger (9)	Brad Currie (4)	Aayan Afzal Khan (5)

=== Squads ===
Canada	Scotland	United Arab Emirates
Saad Bin Zafar (c); Dilpreet Bajwa; Uday Bhagwan; Navneet Dhaliwal; Nikhil Dutta; Dillon Heyliger; Aaron Johnson; Nicholas Kirton; Ammar Khalid; Shreyas Movva (wk); Kaleem Sana; Pargat Singh; Ishwarjot Sohi; Harsh Thaker; Srimantha Wijeratne (wk)	Richie Berrington (c); Matthew Cross (wk); Brad Currie; Scott Currie; Chris Greaves; Oli Hairs; Michael Leask; Brandon McMullen; George Munsey; Safyaan Sharif; Chris Sole; Hamza Tahir; Charlie Tear (wk); Andrew Umeed; Mark Watt; Brad Wheal	Muhammad Waseem (c); Aayan Afzal Khan; Vriitya Aravind (wk); Rahul Bhatia; Rahul Chopra; Basil Hameed; Asif Khan; Zahoor Khan; Akif Raja; Omid Shafi Rahman; Alishan Sharafu; Sanchit Sharma; Junaid Siddique; Tanish Suri (wk); Zuhaib Zubair

On 5 March, Scotland named Oli Hairs as a replacement for the injured Andrew Umeed.

=== Fixtures ===
==== 1st ODI ====
28 February 2024
10:00
Scorecard

United Arab Emirates; 194 (47.5 overs)	v	Canada; 198/7 (47.4 overs)
Muhammad Waseem 49 (82); Kaleem Sana 4/42 (8.5 overs)		Nicholas Kirton 68* (90); Zahoor Khan 3/37 (9 overs)

Canada won by 3 wickets
Dubai International Cricket Stadium, Dubai
Umpires: Shiju Sam (UAE) and Raveendra Wimalasiri (SL)
Player of the match: Nicholas Kirton (Can)

- Canada won the toss and elected to field.
- Rahul Chopra, Tanish Suri, Zuhaib Zubair (UAE) and Ammar Khalid (Can) all made their ODI debuts.

==== 2nd ODI ====
1 March 2024
10:00
Scorecard

Scotland; 215/8 (50 0vers)	v	Canada; 220/3 (40.3 overs)
George Munsey 68 (101); Nicholas Kirton 2/26 (7 overs)		Pargat Singh 87* (99); Chris Greaves 1/31 (6.3 overs)

Canada won by 7 wickets
Dubai International Cricket Stadium, Dubai
Umpires: Aasif Iqbal (UAE) and Shiju Sam (UAE)
Player of the match: Pargat Singh (Can)

- Canada won the toss and elected to field.
- Brad Currie, Scott Currie and Andrew Umeed (Sco) all made their ODI debuts.

==== 3rd ODI ====
3 March 2024
10:00
Scorecard

United Arab Emirates; 132 (45 overs)	v	Scotland; 137/2 (23.4 overs)
Aayan Afzal Khan 45* (70); Brad Currie 3/21 (9 overs)		Charlie Tear 54* (68); Basil Hameed 1/15 (2 overs)

Scotland won by 8 wickets
Dubai International Cricket Stadium, Dubai
Umpires: Aasif Iqbal (UAE) and Raveendra Wimalasiri (SL)
Player of the match: Brad Currie (Sco)

- Scotland won the toss and elected to field.
- Charlie Tear (Sco) made his ODI debut.

==== 4th ODI ====
5 March 2024
10:00
Scorecard

Canada; 241/6 (49.4 overs)	v	United Arab Emirates; 228/8 (46 overs)
Harsh Thaker 111* (113); Aayan Afzal Khan 2/37 (10 overs)		Vriitya Aravind 51 (83); Dillon Heyliger 4/47 (10 overs)

Canada won by 8 runs (DLS method)
Dubai International Cricket Stadium, Dubai
Umpires: Shiju Sam (UAE) and Raveendra Wimalasiri (SL)
Player of the match: Harsh Thaker (Can)

- United Arab Emirates won the toss and elected to field.
- United Arab Emirates were set a revised target of 237 runs in 46 overs.
- Harsh Thaker (Can) scored his first century in ODIs.

==== 5th ODI ====
7 March 2024
10:00
Scorecard

Scotland; 197 (47.3 overs)	v	Canada; 200/5 (45.3 overs)
George Munsey 36 (47); Harsh Thaker 3/41 (10 overs)		Harsh Thaker 105* (150); Brad Wheal 2/51 (9 overs)

Canada won by 5 wickets
Dubai International Cricket Stadium, Dubai
Umpires: Aasif Iqbal (UAE) and Shiju Sam (UAE)
Player of the match: Harsh Thaker (Can)

- Canada won the toss and elected to field.

==== 6th ODI ====
The last match, scheduled to be played between UAE and Scotland on 9 March 2024, was postponed due to a storm in the area. The match was rescheduled to be played during round 11.

== United Arab Emirates v Scotland T20I series ==
Scottish cricket team in United Arab Emirates in 2023–24
	United Arab Emirates	Scotland
- Dates: 11 – 14 March 2024
Captains	Muhammad Waseem	Richie Berrington (Note: Matthew Cross captained Scotland in the second T20I.)

Twenty20 International series
- Results: Scotland won the 3-match series 2–1
Most runs	Muhammad Waseem (75)	George Munsey (122)
Most wickets	Junaid Siddique (8)	Jack Jarvis (7)

=== Squads ===
United Arab Emirates	Scotland
Muhammad Waseem (c); Vriitya Aravind (wk); Rahul Chopra; Basil Hameed; Nilansh Keswani; Aayan Afzal Khan; Aryan Lakra; Hazrat Luqman; Omid Shafi Rahman; Akif Raja; Alishan Sharafu; Junaid Siddique; Tanish Suri (wk); Ashwanth Valthapa; Zuhaib Zubair	Richie Berrington (c); Matthew Cross (wk); Brad Currie; James Dickinson; Chris Greaves; Oli Hairs; Jack Jarvis; Michael Leask; Gavin Main; Brandon McMullen; George Munsey; Safyaan Sharif; Chris Sole; Hamza Tahir; Charlie Tear (wk); Andrew Umeed; Mark Watt

=== T20I fixtures ===
==== 1st T20I ====
11 March 2024
19:30 (N)
Scorecard

Scotland; 147/8 (20 overs)	v	United Arab Emirates; 149/2 (17.4 overs)
George Munsey 75 (49); Junaid Siddique 4/14 (4 overs)		Muhammad Waseem 68* (43); Jack Jarvis 1/33 (4 overs)

United Arab Emitates won by 8 wickets
Dubai International Cricket Stadium, Dubai
Umpires: Akbar Ali (UAE) and Shiju Sam (UAE)
Player of the match: Junaid Siddique (UAE)

- United Arab Emirates won the toss and elected to field.
- Rahul Chopra, Hazrat Luqman, Zuhaib Zubair (UAE) and Jack Jarvis (Sco) all made their T20I debuts.

==== 2nd T20I ====
13 March 2024
19:30 (N)
Scorecard

Scotland; 121/8 (20 overs)	v	United Arab Emirates; 112/9 (20 overs)
Matthew Cross 35 (38); Junaid Siddique 4/18 (4 overs)		Alishan Sharafu 35 (32); Jack Jarvis 3/21 (3 overs)

Scotland won by 9 runs
Dubai International Cricket Stadium, Dubai
Umpires: Akbar Ali (UAE) and Aasif Iqbal (UAE)
Player of the match: Jack Jarvis (Sco)

- United Arab Emirates won the toss and elected to field.
- James Dickinson and Charlie Tear (Sco) both made their T20I debuts.

==== 3rd T20I ====
14 March 2024
19:30 (N)
Scorecard

Scotland; 94 (19.4 overs)	v	United Arab Emirates; 62 (15.2 overs)
George Munsey 21 (18); Aayan Afzal Khan 3/14 (4 overs)		Akif Raja 28 (25); Brad Currie 3/7 (4 overs)

Scotland won by 32 runs
Dubai International Cricket Stadium, Dubai
Umpires: Aasif Iqbal (UAE) and Shiju Sam (UAE)
Player of the match: Brad Currie (Sco)

- United Arab Emirates won the toss and elected to field.
- Omid Shafi Rahman and Ashwanth Valthapa (UAE) both made their T20I debuts.
