= 2025 Netherlands Tri-Nation Series =

Eleventh tri-nation series round in 2024-26 WCL2

- Part of 2024–2026 Cricket World Cup League 2
- Date: 4–16 May 2025
- Location: Netherlands
Teams
Netherlands	Scotland	United Arab Emirates
Captains
Scott Edwards	Richie Berrington	Rahul Chopra
Most runs
Scott Edwards (207)	George Munsey (363)	Muhammad Waseem (169)
Most wickets
Kyle Klein (11)	Brad Currie (10); Brandon McMullen (10)	Simranjeet Singh (10)

The 2025 Netherlands Tri-Nation Series was the eleventh round of the 2024–2026 Cricket World Cup League 2 cricket tournament, which was played in the Netherlands in May 2025. The tri-nation series was contested by the men's national teams of the Netherlands, Scotland and the United Arab Emirates. The matches were played as One Day International (ODI) fixtures. The series included an additional game between Scotland and United Arab Emirates, after a storm had caused a fixture to be postponed during round 2.

== Squads ==
Netherlands	Scotland	United Arab Emirates
Scott Edwards (c, wk); Shariz Ahmad; Noah Croes; Bas de Leede; Aryan Dutt; Vivian Kingma; Fred Klaassen; Kyle Klein; Michael Levitt; Zach Lion-Cachet; Teja Nidamanuru; Max O'Dowd; Vikramjit Singh; Roelof van der Merwe; Paul van Meekeren	Richie Berrington (c); Charlie Cassell; Matthew Cross (wk); Brad Currie; Jasper Davidson; Chris Greaves; Jack Jarvis; Michael Leask; Christopher McBride; Finlay McCreath; Brandon McMullen; George Munsey; Safyaan Sharif; Charlie Tear (wk); Mark Watt	Rahul Chopra (c, wk); Zahid Ali; Vriitya Aravind (wk); Muhammad Jawadullah; Sagar Kalyan; Aayan Afzal Khan; Asif Khan; Dhruv Parashar; Alishan Sharafu; Aryansh Sharma (wk); Sanchit Sharma; Junaid Siddique; Simranjeet Singh; Tanish Suri (wk); Muhammad Waseem

== Tour matches ==
29 April 2025
11:00
Scorecard

United Arab Emirates XI; 215 (46.4 overs)	v	Netherlands A 218/2 (43 overs)
Aryansh Sharma 60 (83); Mees van Vliet 4/39 (10 overs)		Noah Croes 94* (116); Dhruv Parashar 1/26 (6.1 overs)

Netherlands A won by 8 wickets
VRA Cricket Ground, Amstelveen
Umpires: Nitin Bathi (Ned) and Maulik Prabhudesai (Ned)

- United Arab Emirates XI won the toss and elected to bat.

1 May 2025
11:00
Scorecard

Netherlands A 171 (48.1 overs)	v	United Arab Emirates XI; 177/3 (29 overs)
Bas de Leede 48 (63); Zahid Ali 4/45 (10 overs)		Sagar Kalyan 84* (87); Shariz Ahmad 2/26 (5 overs)

United Arab Emirates XI won by 7 wickets
VRA Cricket Ground, Amstelveen
Umpires: Jnanesh Kolli (Ned) and Maulik Prabhudesai (Ned)

- Netherlands A won the toss and elected to bat.

== Fixtures ==
=== 1st ODI ===
This match was originally scheduled to be held in Dubai on 9 March 2024 before being postponed due to a storm.

4 May 2025
11:00
Scorecard

United Arab Emirates; 225/9 (50 overs)	v	Scotland; 226/7 (46.2 overs)
Muhammad Waseem 61 (72); Mark Watt 2/34 (10 overs)		George Munsey 78 (101); Simranjeet Singh 2/26 (10 overs)

Scotland won by 3 wickets
VRA Cricket Ground, Amstelveen
Umpires: Rizwan Akram (Ned) and Roland Black (Ire)
Player of the match: George Munsey (Sco)

- Scotland won the toss and elected to field.
- Finlay McCreath (Sco), Sagar Kalyan and Simranjeet Singh (UAE) all made their ODI debuts.

=== 2nd ODI ===
6 May 2025
11:00
Scorecard

Netherlands; 272/7 (50 overs)	v	United Arab Emirates; 159 (41.2 overs)
Scott Edwards 74 (78); Aayan Afzal Khan 3/60 (10 overs)		Alishan Sharafu 58 (65); Paul van Meekeren 3/24 (8 overs)

Netherlands won by 113 runs
VRA Cricket Ground, Amstelveen
Umpires: Nitin Bathi (Ned) and Roland Black (Ire)
Player of the match: Scott Edwards (Ned)

- United Arab Emirates won the toss and elected to field.

=== 3rd ODI ===
8 May 2025
11:00
Scorecard

United Arab Emirates; 296/6 (50 overs)	v	Scotland; 199 (43.3 overs)
Rahul Chopra 101 (94); Michael Leask 1/30 (7 overs)		George Munsey 43 (53); Simranjeet Singh 4/30 (10 overs)

United Arab Emirates won by 97 runs
VRA Cricket Ground, Amstelveen
Umpires: Rizwan Akram (Ned) and Nitin Bathi (Ned)
Player of the match: Rahul Chopra (UAE)

- United Arab Emirates won the toss and elected to bat.
- Rahul Chopra (UAE) scored his first century in ODIs.

=== 4th ODI ===
10 May 2025
11:00
Scorecard

Netherlands; 282/7 (50 overs)	v	Scotland; 263/9 (50 overs)
Zach Lion-Cachet 78 (99); Brad Currie 4/52 (10 overs)		George Munsey 106 (101); Roelof van der Merwe 3/34 (10 overs)

Netherlands won by 19 runs
VRA Cricket Ground, Amstelveen
Umpires: Rizwan Akram (Ned) and Roland Black (Ire)
Player of the match: Paul van Meekeren (Ned)

- Netherlands won the toss and elected to bat.

=== 5th ODI ===
12 May 2025
11:00
Scorecard

United Arab Emirates; 204/9 (50 overs)	v	Netherlands; 205/5 (36 overs)
Asif Khan 75 (101); Kyle Klein 4/44 (10 overs)		Max O'Dowd 52 (44); Dhruv Parashar 1/32 (6 overs)

Netherlands won by 5 wickets
Sportpark Maarschalkerweerd, Utrecht
Umpires: Nitin Bathi (Ned) and Roland Black (Ire)
Player of the match: Kyle Klein (Ned)

- United Arab Emirates won the toss and elected to bat.

=== 6th ODI ===
14 May 2025
11:00
Scorecard

United Arab Emirates; 161 (47.5 overs)	v	Scotland; 162/2 (24.2 overs)
Muhammad Waseem 61 (75); Brad Currie 3/34 (9.5 overs)		George Munsey 56 (45); Muhammad Jawadullah 1/40 (4 overs)

Scotland won by 8 wickets
Sportpark Maarschalkerweerd, Utrecht
Umpires: Rizwan Akram (Ned) and Nitin Bathi (Ned)
Player of the match: Brandon McMullen (Sco)

- United Arab Emirates won the toss and elected to bat.

=== 7th ODI ===
16 May 2025 (Note: The postponed UAE–Scotland match from round 2 was played in this series as the #7th ODI.)
11:00
Scorecard

Scotland; 380/9 (50 overs)	v	Netherlands; 235 (42.1 overs)
Richie Berrington 105 (86); Kyle Klein 3/60 (9 overs)		Bas de Leede 74 (67); Brandon McMullen 4/55 (10 overs)

Scotland won by 145 runs
Sportpark Maarschalkerweerd, Utrecht
Umpires: Rizwan Akram (Ned) and Roland Black (Ire)
Player of the match: Brandon McMullen (Sco)

- Netherlands won the toss and elected to field.
- Scott Edwards (Ned) scored his 2,000th run in ODIs and 3,000th run in international cricket.
- This was Scotland's highest innings total in men's ODIs.
