= 2023 Cricket World Cup Qualifier =

2023 International cricket tournament Qualifier

2023 ICC Men's Cricket World Cup Qualifier
- Official tournament logo
- Dates: 18 June 2023 – 9 July 2023
- Administrator: International Cricket Council
- Cricket format: One Day International
- Tournament format(s): Group round-robin and play-offs
- Host: Zimbabwe
- Champions: Sri Lanka (2nd title)
- Runners-up: Netherlands
- Participants: 10
- Matches: 34
- Player of the series: (Zimbabwe) Sean Williams
- Most runs: (Zimbabwe) Sean Williams (600)
- Most wickets: (Sri Lanka) Wanindu Hasaranga (22)
- Official website: International Cricket Council

The 2023 ICC Men's Cricket World Cup Qualifier was the 12th edition of the Cricket World Cup Qualifier, which took place in June and July 2023 in Zimbabwe. It was the culmination of the 2023 Cricket World Cup qualification process and decided the final two participants for the 2023 Cricket World Cup in India.

In July 2020, Zimbabwe announced their intention to host the qualifier. They had hosted the previous qualification tournament in March 2018. In December 2020, Zimbabwe were confirmed as the tournament hosts.

A fire occurred at the Harare Sports Club on 20 June 2023 behind the southwest grandstand, but no damage took place, and this did not affect the scheduling. Following an inspection by an ICC security team, the venue was cleared for hosting the tournament. The two finalists, Sri Lanka and the Netherlands, claimed the last two places at the 2023 Cricket World Cup. Sri Lanka won the tournament, beating the Netherlands by 128 runs in a one-sided final.

== Teams and qualification ==
The tournament featured ten teams; the bottom five teams from the 2020–23 World Cup Super League, the top three teams from the 2019–23 Cricket World Cup League 2, and the top two teams from the 2023 Cricket World Cup Qualifier Play-off.

All matches in the qualifier tournament were One Day International (ODI) status. The International Cricket Council (ICC) confirmed that DRS would be used in the tournament, but only for matches in the Super Six stage and onwards. This was the first time the system was used in the Cricket World Cup Qualifier tournament.

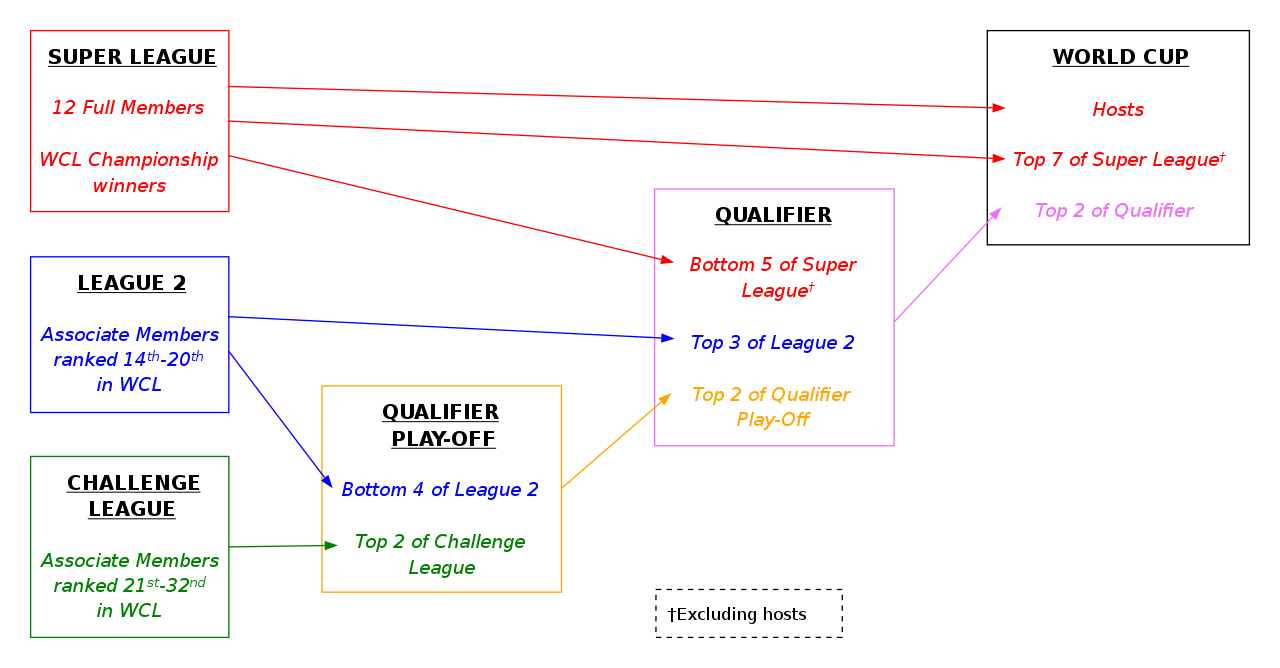
A diagram that explains the qualification structure for the 2023 ICC Cricket World Cup

Means of qualification	Date	Venue	Berths	Qualified
Super League (Bottom 5)	30 July 2020 – 14 May 2023	Various	5	Ireland; Netherlands; Sri Lanka; West Indies; Zimbabwe
League 2 (Top 3)	14 August 2019 – 16 March 2023	Various	3	Nepal; Oman; Scotland
Qualifier Play-off (Top 2)	26 March – 5 April 2023	Namibia	2	United Arab Emirates; United States
Total			10	

=== Implications for future competition ===
The top two sides from this qualifier will be awarded a spot in the 2023 Cricket World Cup. Originally, it was intended that the top-ranked team in the CWC League 2 (Scotland) could be promoted to the next Super League at the expense of the 13th ranked Super League team (Netherlands); but only if the League 2 winner finished as the higher of the two in this tournament. The team ranked lower would then have played in the next edition of League 2. However, in November 2021, the ICC announced that there would not be a second edition of the Super League.

== Venues ==
Locations of venues for the 2023 Cricket World Cup Qualifier

Harare		Bulawayo	
Harare Sports Club	Takashinga Cricket Club	Queens Sports Club	Bulawayo Athletic Club
Capacity: 10,000	Capacity: –	Capacity: 13,000	Capacity: 12,000

== Squads ==
The following squads were named ahead of the tournament:

Ireland	Nepal	Netherlands	Oman	Scotland
Andrew Balbirnie (c); Mark Adair; Curtis Campher; Gareth Delany; George Dockrell; Graham Hume; Josh Little; Andy McBrine; Barry McCarthy; PJ Moor (wk); Paul Stirling; Harry Tector; Lorcan Tucker (wk); Ben White; Craig Young	Rohit Paudel (c); Dipendra Singh Airee; Kushal Bhurtel; Pratis GC; Gulsan Jha; Sompal Kami; Karan KC; Sandeep Lamichhane; Kishore Mahato; Gyanendra Malla (wk); Sandeep Lamichhane; Lalit Rajbanshi; Arjun Saud (wk); Bhim Sharki; Aarif Sheikh; Aasif Sheikh (wk)	Scott Edwards (c, wk); Shariz Ahmad; Wesley Barresi; Noah Croes (wk); Bas de Leede; Aryan Dutt; Clayton Floyd; Vivian Kingma; Ryan Klein; Michael Levitt; Teja Nidamanuru; Max O'Dowd; Logan van Beek; Vikramjit Singh (wk); Saqib Zulfiqar	Zeeshan Maqsood (c); Aqib Ilyas (vc); Fayyaz Butt; Sandeep Goud; Kaleemullah; Ayaan Khan; Bilal Khan; Shoaib Khan; Naseem Khushi (wk); Suraj Kumar (wk); Mohammad Nadeem; Jay Odedra; Kashyap Prajapati; Rafiullah; Adeel Shafique (wk); Samay Shrivastava; Jatinder Singh (wk)	Richie Berrington (c); Matthew Cross (wk); Alasdair Evans; Chris Greaves; Jack Jarvis; Michael Leask; Tomas Mackintosh (wk); Christopher McBride; Brandon McMullen; George Munsey; Adrian Neill; Safyaan Sharif; Chris Sole; Hamza Tahir; Mark Watt
Sri Lanka	United Arab Emirates	United States	West Indies	Zimbabwe
Dasun Shanaka (c); Kusal Mendis (vc, wk); Sahan Arachchige; Charith Asalanka; ~~Dushmantha Chameera~~; Dhananjaya de Silva; Wanindu Hasaranga; Dushan Hemantha; Chamika Karunaratne; Dimuth Karunaratne; Lahiru Kumara; Dilshan Madushanka; Pathum Nissanka; Matheesha Pathirana; Kasun Rajitha; Sadeera Samarawickrama (wk); Maheesh Theekshana	Muhammad Waseem (c); Vriitya Aravind (wk); Basil Hameed; Ethan D'Souza; Muhammad Jawadullah; Aayan Afzal Khan; Asif Khan; Zahoor Khan; Karthik Meiyappan; Rohan Mustafa; Ali Naseer; Rameez Shahzad; Junaid Siddique; Aryansh Sharma (wk); Sanchit Sharma	Monank Patel (c, wk); Aaron Jones (vc); Shayan Jahangir; Nosthush Kenjige; Ali Khan; Sushant Modani; Saiteja Mukkamalla; Saurabh Netravalkar; Abhishek Paradkar; Nisarg Patel; Kyle Phillip; Usman Rafiq; Gajanand Singh; Jessy Singh; Steven Taylor (wk)	Shai Hope (c, wk); Rovman Powell (vc); Shamarh Brooks; ~~Yannic Cariah~~; Keacy Carty; Johnson Charles (wk); Roston Chase; Jason Holder; Akeal Hosein; Alzarri Joseph; Brandon King; Kyle Mayers; ~~Gudakesh Motie~~; Keemo Paul; Nicholas Pooran; Romario Shepherd; Kevin Sinclair	Craig Ervine (c); Ryan Burl; Tendai Chatara; Brad Evans; Joylord Gumbie (wk); Luke Jongwe; Innocent Kaia; Clive Madande (wk); Wesley Madhevere; Tadiwanashe Marumani (wk); Wellington Masakadza; Nyasha Mayavo (wk); Blessing Muzarabani; Richard Ngarava; Sikandar Raza; Sean Williams

On June 8, Gudakesh Motie was ruled out of the tournament due to a lower back injury and was replaced in West Indies' squad by Johnson Charles. Sri Lanka added Sahan Arachchige, Dilshan Madushanka and Dunith Wellalage as standby players to their squad during the group stage of the tournament. Before the Super Six stage of the tournament, Nyasha Mayavo was added to Zimbabwe's squad to replace the injured Clive Madande. Yannic Cariah was also ruled out of the tournament after the group stages, and Kevin Sinclair replaced in West Indies' squad. Dilshan Madushanka was later added to Sri Lanka's main squad after an injury ruled out Dushmantha Chameera. Lahiru Kumara too was ruled out of the remainder of the tournament during the Super Six stage, and Sahan Arachchige was added to Sri Lanka's main squad to replace him.

== Warm-up matches ==
Ten non-ODI warm-up matches were played on 13 June and 15 June 2023.

Warm-up matches

13 June 2023
09:00
Scorecard

West Indies; 264 (48.4 overs)	v	Scotland; 173 (33.5 overs)
Shai Hope 57 (65); Chris Sole 4/50 (10 overs)		Brandon McMullen 38 (54); Yannic Cariah 4/46 (9 overs)

West Indies won by 91 runs
Harare Sports Club, Harare
Umpires: Raveendra Wimalasiri (SL) and Asif Yaqoob (Pak)

- Scotland won the toss and elected to field.

13 June 2023
09:00
Scorecard

Zimbabwe; 367/6 (50 overs)	v	Oman; 339 (49.4 overs)
Sikandar Raza 109* (66); Fayyaz Butt 2/38 (9 overs)		Aqib Ilyas 113 (103); Sikandar Raza 3/42 (8 overs)

Zimbabwe won by 28 runs
Takashinga Cricket Club, Harare
Umpires: Jayaraman Madanagopal (Ind) and Allahudien Paleker (SA)

- Oman won the toss and elected to field.

13 June 2023
09:00
Scorecard

Nepal; 275 (49.5 overs)	v	United Arab Emirates; 276/7 (49.5 overs)
Aasif Sheikh 76 (104); Ali Naseer 4/52 (10 overs)		Rohan Mustafa 77* (56); Karan KC 2/46 (7.5 overs)

United Arab Emirates won by 3 wickets
Old Hararians, Harare
Umpires: Alex Wharf (Eng) and Martin Saggers (Eng)

- Nepal won the toss and elected to bat.

13 June 2023
09:00
Scorecard

Netherlands; 214 (45.3 overs)	v	Sri Lanka; 215/7 (37.1 overs)
Saqib Zulfiqar 56 (64); Kasun Rajitha 3/19 (7 overs)		Dasun Shanaka 67* (52); Clayton Floyd 2/40 (7 overs)

Sri Lanka won by 3 wickets
Queens Sports Club, Bulawayo
Umpires: Gregory Brathwaite (WI) and Wayne Knights (NZ)

- Sri Lanka won the toss and elected to field.

13 June 2023
09:00
Scorecard

United States; 312/6 (50 overs)	v	Ireland; 315/5 (45.1 overs)
Aaron Jones 89 (87); Ben White 2/56 (10 overs)		Harry Tector 149* (123); Saurabh Netravalkar 1/25 (7 overs)

Ireland won by 5 wickets
Bulawayo Athletic Club, Bulawayo
Umpires: Bongani Jele (SA) and Leslie Reifer (WI)

- Ireland won the toss and elected to field.

15 June 2023
09:00
Scorecard

Oman; 267 (49.2 overs)	v	Nepal; 274/8 (44.5 overs)
Zeeshan Maqsood 109 (106); Sompal Kami 5/57 (9.2 overs)		Kushal Bhurtel 101* (94); Aqib Ilyas 4/42 (7.5 overs)

Nepal won by 2 wickets
Harare Sports Club, Harare
Umpires: Roland Black (Ire) and Ahmed Shah Pakteen (Afg)

- Oman won the toss and elected to bat.

15 June 2023
09:00
Scorecard

West Indies; 374/9 (50 overs)	v	United Arab Emirates; 260/9 (50 overs)
Rovman Powell 105 (55); Muhammad Jawadullah 3/50 (8 overs)		Basil Hameed 122 (108); Yannic Cariah 4/58 (10 overs)

West Indies won by 114 runs
Takashinga Cricket Club, Harare
Umpires: Sam Nogajski (Aus) and Raveendra Wimalasiri (SL)

- West Indies won the toss and elected to bat.

15 June 2023
09:00
Scorecard

Scotland; 163 (38.2 overs)	v	Zimbabwe; 166/4 (24.5 overs)
Brandon McMullen 49 (56); Sean Williams 2/14 (3 overs)		Sikandar Raza 44 (25); Michael Leask 2/30 (5 overs)

Zimbabwe won by 6 wickets
Old Hararians, Harare
Umpires: Jayaraman Madanagopal (Ind) and Asif Yaqoob (Pak)

- Zimbabwe won the toss and elected to field.

15 June 2023
09:00
Scorecard

Ireland; 193 (39.2 overs)	v	Netherlands; 196/8 (37.3 overs)
Lorcan Tucker 74 (90); Logan van Beek 2/23 (7 overs)		Wesley Barresi 90* (86); Ben White 5/61 (10 overs)

Netherlands won by 2 wickets
Queens Sports Club, Bulawayo
Umpires: Iknow Chabi (Zim) and Langton Rusere (Zim)

- Ireland won the toss and elected to bat.

15 June 2023
09:00
Scorecard

Sri Lanka; 392/4 (50 overs)	v	United States; 194 (33.2 overs)
Dimuth Karunaratne 111* (100); Saurabh Netravalkar 2/60 (9 overs)		Monank Patel 68 (44); Matheesha Pathirana 4/23 (6 overs)

Sri Lanka won by 198 runs
Bulawayo Athletic Club, Bulawayo
Umpires: Aleem Dar (Pak) and Leslie Reifer (WI)

- United States won the toss and elected to field.

== Group stage ==
The draw for the group stage was announced on 23 May 2023, with Group A was played in Harare and Group B in Bulawayo. The top three teams in each group advanced to the Super Six.

=== Group A ===
==== Points table ====
Pos	Team	Pld	W	L	NR	Pts	NRR	Qualification
1	Zimbabwe	4	4	0	0	8	2.241	Advanced to the Super Six
2	Netherlands	4	3	1	0	6	0.667	Advanced to the Super Six
3	West Indies	4	2	2	0	4	0.525	Advanced to the Super Six
4	Nepal	4	1	3	0	2	−1.176	Advanced to the 7th–10th Play-offs
5	United States	4	0	4	0	0	−2.169	Advanced to the 7th–10th Play-offs

Source: ESPNcricinfo

==== Fixtures ====
18 June 2023
09:00
Scorecard

Nepal; 290/8 (50 overs)	v	Zimbabwe; 291/2 (44.1 overs)
Kushal Bhurtel 99 (95); Richard Ngarava 4/43 (9 overs)		Craig Ervine 121* (128); Sompal Kami 1/30 (5.3 overs)

Zimbabwe won by 8 wickets
Harare Sports Club, Harare
Umpires: Allahudien Paleker (SA) and Sam Nogajski (Aus)
Player of the match: Craig Ervine (Zim)

- Zimbabwe won the toss and elected to field.
- Joylord Gumbie (Zim) made his ODI debut.

18 June 2023
09:00
Scorecard

West Indies; 297 (49.3 overs)	v	United States; 258/7 (50 overs)
Johnson Charles 66 (80); Steven Taylor 3/53 (8 overs)		Gajanand Singh 101* (109); Kyle Mayers 2/30 (6 overs)

West Indies won by 39 runs
Takashinga Cricket Club, Harare
Umpires: Roland Black (Ire) and Jayaraman Madanagopal (Ind)
Player of the match: Jason Holder (WI)

- United States won the toss and elected to field.
- This was the first ODI match to be played at this venue.
- Gajanand Singh (USA) scored his first century in ODIs.

20 June 2023
09:00
Scorecard

Netherlands; 315/6 (50 overs)	v	Zimbabwe; 319/4 (40.5 overs)
Vikramjit Singh 88 (111); Sikander Raza 4/55 (10 overs)		Sikandar Raza 102* (54); Shariz Ahmad 2/62 (6 overs)

Zimbabwe won by 6 wickets
Harare Sports Club, Harare
Umpires: Martin Saggers (Eng) and Raveendra Wimalasiri (SL)
Player of the match: Sikandar Raza (Zim)

- Zimbabwe won the toss and elected to field.
- Sikandar Raza scored the fastest century for Zimbabwe in ODIs in terms of balls faced (54).

20 June 2023
09:00
Scorecard

United States; 207 (49 overs)	v	Nepal; 211/4 (43 overs)
Shayan Jahangir 100* (79); Karan KC 4/33 (9 overs)		Bhim Sharki 77* (114); Steven Taylor 1/14 (5 overs)

Nepal won by 6 wickets
Takashinga Cricket Club, Harare
Umpires: Ahmed Shah Pakteen (Afg) and Asif Yaqoob (Pak)
Player of the match: Karan KC (Nep)

- Nepal won the toss and elected to field.
- Shayan Jahangir (USA) scored his first century in ODIs.

22 June 2023
09:00
Scorecard

West Indies; 339/7 (50 overs)	v	Nepal; 238 (49.4 overs)
Shai Hope 132 (129); Lalit Rajbanshi 3/52 (10 overs)		Aarif Sheikh 63 (93); Jason Holder 3/34 (10 overs)

West Indies won by 101 runs
Harare Sports Club, Harare
Umpires: Allahudien Paleker (SA) and Martin Saggers (Eng)
Player of the match: Shai Hope (WI)

- Nepal won the toss and elected to field.

22 June 2023
09:00
Scorecard

United States; 211/8 (50 overs)	v	Netherlands; 214/5 (43.2 overs)
Shayan Jahangir 71 (86); Ryan Klein 2/31 (9 overs)		Scott Edwards 67* (60); Jessy Singh 2/35 (8 overs)

Netherlands won by 5 wickets
Takashinga Cricket Club, Harare
Umpires: Roland Black (Ire) and Jayaraman Madanagopal (Ind)
Player of the match: Scott Edwards (Ned)

- Netherlands won the toss and elected to field.
- Scott Edwards and Wesley Barresi (Ned) both passed 1,000 runs in ODIs.

24 June 2023
09:00
Scorecard

Zimbabwe; 268 (49.5 overs)	v	West Indies; 233 (44.4 overs)
Sikandar Raza 68 (58); Keemo Paul 3/61 (10 overs)		Kyle Mayers 56 (72); Tendai Chatara 3/52 (9.4 overs)

Zimbabwe won by 35 runs
Harare Sports Club, Harare
Umpires: Sam Nogajski (Aus) and Raveendra Wimalasiri (SL)
Player of the match: Sikandar Raza (Zim)

- West Indies won the toss and elected to field.

24 June 2023
09:00
Scorecard

Nepal; 167 (44.3 overs)	v	Netherlands; 168/3 (27.1 overs)
Rohit Paudel 33 (55); Logan van Beek 4/24 (9.3 overs)		Max O'Dowd 90 (75); Sandeep Lamichhane 2/60 (10 overs)

Netherlands won by 7 wickets
Takashinga Cricket Club, Harare
Umpires: Ahmed Shah Pakteen (Afg) and Martin Saggers (Eng)
Player of the match: Max O'Dowd (Ned)

- Netherlands won the toss and elected to field.
- Netherlands, West Indies, and Zimbabwe qualified for the Super Six stage as a result of this match.

26 June 2023
09:00
Scorecard

Zimbabwe; 408/6 (50 overs)	v	United States; 104 (25.1 overs)
Sean Williams 174 (101); Abhishek Paradkar 3/78 (9 overs)		Abhishek Paradkar 24 (31); Sikandar Raza 2/15 (5 overs)

Zimbabwe won by 304 runs
Harare Sports Club, Harare
Umpires: Sam Nogajski (Aus) and Martin Saggers (Eng)
Player of the match: Sean Williams (Zim)

- United States won the toss and elected to field.
- This was Zimbabwe's first score of 400+ in ODIs.
- This was Zimbabwe's highest margin of victory and the overall second-highest margin of victory in ODI cricket.

26 June 2023
09:00
Scorecard

West Indies; 374/6 (50 overs)	v	Netherlands; 374/9 (50 overs)
Nicholas Pooran 104* (65); Saqib Zulfiqar 2/43 (7 overs)		Teja Nidamanuru 111 (76); Roston Chase 3/77 (10 overs)

Match tied (Netherlands won the Super Over)
Takashinga Cricket Club, Harare
Umpires: Jayaraman Madanagopal (Ind) and Raveendra Wimalasiri (SL)
Player of the match: Logan van Beek (Ned)

- Netherlands won the toss and elected to field.
- Super Over: Netherlands 30/0, West Indies 8/2.
- This was the highest ODI score for Netherlands and their first win against West Indies in ODIs.
- 30 runs scored by Netherlands' Logan Van Beek is the most runs scored by a team in a Super Over in international cricket.
- This was the highest-scoring tie in ODIs.

=== Group B ===
==== Points table ====
Pos	Team	Pld	W	L	NR	Pts	NRR	Qualification
1	Sri Lanka	4	4	0	0	8	3.047	Advanced to the Super Six
2	Scotland	4	3	1	0	6	0.540	Advanced to the Super Six
3	Oman	4	2	2	0	4	−1.221	Advanced to the Super Six
4	Ireland	4	1	3	0	2	−0.061	Advanced to the 7th–10th Play-offs
5	United Arab Emirates	4	0	4	0	0	−2.249	Advanced to the 7th–10th Play-offs

Source: ESPNcricinfo

==== Fixtures ====
19 June 2023
09:00
Scorecard

Sri Lanka; 355/6 (50 overs)	v	United Arab Emirates; 180 (39 overs)
Kusal Mendis 78 (63); Ali Naseer 2/44 (10 overs)		Muhammad Waseem 39 (48); Wanindu Hasaranga 6/24 (8 overs)

Sri Lanka won by 175 runs
Queens Sports Club, Bulawayo
Umpires: Wayne Knights (NZ) and Langton Rusere (Zim)
Player of the match: Wanindu Hasaranga (SL)

- United Arab Emirates won the toss and elected to field.
- Wanindu Hasaranga (SL) took his first five-wicket haul and his 50th wicket in ODIs.

19 June 2023
09:00
Scorecard

Ireland; 281/7 (50 overs)	v	Oman; 285/5 (48.1 overs)
George Dockrell 91* (89); Bilal Khan 2/64 (10 overs)		Kashyap Prajapati 72 (74); Mark Adair 2/47 (9.1 overs)

Oman won by 5 wickets
Bulawayo Athletic Club, Bulawayo
Umpires: Iknow Chabi (Zim) and Aleem Dar (Pak)
Player of the match: Zeeshan Maqsood (Oma)

- Oman won the toss and elected to field.
- Ben White (Ire) made his ODI debut.
- This was Oman's first victory over a full member in ODIs.

21 June 2023
09:00
Scorecard

Ireland; 286/8 (50 overs)	v	Scotland; 289/9 (50 overs)
Curtis Campher 120 (108); Brandon McMullen 5/34 (7 overs)		Michael Leask 91* (61); Mark Adair 3/57 (10 overs)

Scotland won by 1 wicket
Queens Sports Club, Bulawayo
Umpires: Leslie Reifer (WI) and Alex Wharf (Eng)
Player of the match: Michael Leask (Sco)

- Scotland won the toss and elected to field.
- Curtis Campher (Ire) scored his first century in ODIs.
- Brandon McMullen took his first five-wicket haul in ODIs.
- George Dockrell (Ire) took his 100th wicket in ODIs.

21 June 2023
09:00
Scorecard

United Arab Emirates; 227/8 (50 overs)	v	Oman; 228/5 (46 overs)
Aayan Afzal Khan 58* (52); Jay Odedra 3/31 (7 overs)		Aqib Ilyas 53 (75); Rohan Mustafa 2/31 (6 overs)

Oman won by 5 wickets
Bulawayo Athletic Club, Bulawayo
Umpires: Gregory Brathwaite (WI) and Bongani Jele (SA)
Player of the match: Shoaib Khan (Oma)

- Oman won the toss and elected to field.

23 June 2023
09:00
Scorecard

Oman; 98 (30.2 overs)	v	Sri Lanka; 100/0 (15 overs)
Ayaan Khan 41 (60); Wanindu Hasaranga 5/13 (7.2 overs)		Dimuth Karunaratne 61* (51)

Sri Lanka won by 10 wickets
Queens Sports Club, Bulawayo
Umpires: Gregory Brathwaite (WI) and Langton Rusere (Zim)
Player of the match: Wanindu Hasaranga (SL)

- Sri Lanka won the toss and elected to field.

23 June 2023
09:00
Scorecard

Scotland; 282/8 (50 overs)	v	United Arab Emirates; 171 (35.3 overs)
Richie Berrington 127 (136); Junaid Siddique 3/49 (10 overs)		Muhammad Waseem 36 (57); Safyaan Sharif 4/20 (6.3 overs)

Scotland won by 111 runs
Bulawayo Athletic Club, Bulawayo
Umpires: Iknow Chabi (Zim) and Aleem Dar (Pak)
Player of the match: Richie Berrington (Sco)

- United Arab Emirates won the toss and elected to field.

25 June 2023
09:00
Scorecard

Sri Lanka; 325 (49.5 overs)	v	Ireland; 192 (31 overs)
Dimuth Karunaratne 103 (103); Mark Adair 4/46 (9.5 overs)		Curtis Campher 39 (31); Wanindu Hasaranga 5/79 (10 overs)

Sri Lanka won by 133 runs
Queens Sports Club, Bulawayo
Umpires: Gregory Brathwaite (WI) and Wayne Knights (NZ)
Player of the match: Dimuth Karunaratne (SL)

- Ireland won the toss and elected to field.
- Dimuth Karunaratne (SL) scored his first century in ODIs.
- Sri Lanka, Scotland, and Oman qualified for the Super Six stage as a result of this match.
- Wanindu Hasaranga became the second bowler to take three consecutive five-wicket hauls in ODIs.

25 June 2023
09:00
Scorecard

Scotland; 320 (50 overs)	v	Oman; 244/9 (50 overs)
Brandon McMullen 136 (121); Bilal Khan 5/55 (10 overs)		Naseem Khushi 69 (53); Chris Greaves 5/53 (10 overs)

Scotland won by 76 runs
Bulawayo Athletic Club, Bulawayo
Umpires: Bongani Jele (SA) and Alex Wharf (Eng)
Player of the match: Brandon McMullen (Sco)

- Oman won the toss and elected to field.
- Brandon McMullen (Sco) scored his first century in ODIs.

27 June 2023
09:00
Scorecard

Sri Lanka; 245 (49.3 overs)	v	Scotland; 163 (29 overs)
Pathum Nissanka 75 (85); Chris Greaves 4/32 (6.3 overs)		Chris Greaves 56* (41); Maheesh Theekshana 3/41 (10 overs)

Sri Lanka won by 82 runs
Queens Sports Club, Bulawayo
Umpires: Bongani Jele (SA) and Alex Wharf (Eng)
Player of the match: Maheesh Theekshana (SL)

- Scotland won the toss and elected to field.

27 June 2023
09:00
Scorecard

Ireland; 349/4 (50 overs)	v	United Arab Emirates; 211 (39 overs)
Paul Stirling 162 (134); Sanchit Sharma 3/46 (7 overs)		Muhammad Waseem 45 (32); Curtis Campher 2/14 (2 overs)

Ireland won by 138 runs
Bulawayo Athletic Club, Bulawayo
Umpires: Leslie Reifer (WI) and Langton Rusere (Zim)
Player of the match: Paul Stirling (Ire)

- United Arab Emirates won the toss and elected to field.

== Play-offs ==
=== Bracket ===
Play-off semi-finals
A5	United States	196 (42.4)
B4	Ireland	197/4 (34.2)
B5	United Arab Emirates	181 (46.5)
A4	Nepal	185/7 (43.2)

7th place play-off
A4	Nepal	268/9 (50)
B4	Ireland	269/8 (49.2)
9th place play-off
B5	United Arab Emirates	308/4 (50)
A5	United States	307/9 (50)

=== Play-off semi-finals ===
30 June 2023
09:00
Scorecard

United States; 196 (42.4 overs)	v	Ireland; 197/4 (34.2 overs)
Saiteja Mukkamalla 55 (46); Craig Young 3/35 (7 overs)		Paul Stirling 58 (45); Nosthush Kenjige 2/41 (7 overs)

Ireland won by 6 wickets
Takashinga Cricket Club, Harare
Umpires: Leslie Reifer (WI) and Ahmed Shah Pakteen (Afg)
Player of the match: Craig Young (Ire)

- Ireland won the toss and elected to field.

2 July 2023
09:00
Scorecard

United Arab Emirates; 181 (46.5 overs)	v	Nepal; 185/7 (43.2 overs)
Vriitya Aravind 44 (75); Sandeep Lamichhane 3/23 (10 overs)		Dipendra Singh Airee 79* (85); Muhammad Jawadullah 3/46 (10 overs)

Nepal won by 3 wickets
Takashinga Cricket Club, Harare
Umpires: Aleem Dar (Pak) and Bongani Jele (SA)
Player of the match: Dipendra Singh Airee (Nep)

- Nepal won the toss and elected to field.

=== 7th place play-off ===
4 July 2023
09:00
Scorecard

Nepal; 268/9 (50 overs)	v	Ireland; 269/8 (49.2 overs)
Gulsan Jha 57* (42); Craig Young 2/36 (7 overs)		Curtis Campher 62 (59); Karan KC 4/58 (10 overs)

Ireland won by 2 wickets
Takashinga Cricket Club, Harare
Umpires: Jayaraman Madanagopal (Ind) and Leslie Reifer (WI)
Player of the match: Curtis Campher (Ire)

- Ireland won the toss and elected to field.

=== 9th place play-off ===
6 July 2023
10:00
Scorecard

United Arab Emirates; 308/4 (50 overs)	v	United States; 307/9 (50 overs)
Asif Khan 151* (145); Ali Khan 2/61 (10 overs)		Aaron Jones 75 (103); Sanchit Sharma 3/37 (6 overs)

UAE won by 1 run
Takashinga Cricket Club, Harare
Umpires: Iknow Chabi (Zim) and Asif Yaqoob (Pak)
Player of the match: Asif Khan (UAE)

- United Arab Emirates won the toss and elected to bat.
- Asif Khan (UAE) made the highest individual score in ODIs for UAE.

== Super Six ==
Teams that advance to the Super Six played three further matches against the qualifiers from the other group, with the two results against teams from their own group carrying forward from the group stage. Teams also carried forward their seeding positions from the first stage to determine the fixtures for the Super Six.

=== Points table ===
Pos	Team	Pld	W	L	NR	Pts	NRR	
1	Sri Lanka	5	5	0	0	10	1.600	Advanced to the Final and qualified for the 2023 Cricket World Cup
2	Netherlands	5	3	2	0	6	0.160	Advanced to the Final and qualified for the 2023 Cricket World Cup
3	Scotland	5	3	2	0	6	0.102	
4	Zimbabwe (H)	5	3	2	0	6	−0.099	
5	West Indies	5	1	4	0	2	−0.204	
6	Oman	5	0	5	0	0	−1.895	

Source: ICC
(H) Host

=== Fixtures ===
29 June 2023
09:00
Scorecard

Zimbabwe; 332/7 (50 overs)	v	Oman; 318/9 (50 overs)
Sean Williams 142 (103); Fayyaz Butt 4/79 (10 overs)		Kashyap Prajapati 103 (97); Blessing Muzarabani 3/57 (9 overs)

Zimbabwe won by 14 runs
Queens Sports Club, Bulawayo
Umpires: Roland Black (Ire) and Wayne Knights (NZ)
Player of the match: Sean Williams (Zim)

- Oman won the toss and elected to field.
- This was Oman's highest total in ODIs.

30 June 2023
09:00
Scorecard

Sri Lanka; 213 (47.4 overs)	v	Netherlands; 192 (40 overs)
Dhananjaya de Silva 93 (111); Logan van Beek 3/26 (9 overs)		Scott Edwards 67* (68); Maheesh Theekshana 3/31 (9 overs)

Sri Lanka won by 21 runs
Queens Sports Club, Bulawayo
Umpires: Gregory Brathwaite (WI) and Martin Saggers (Eng)
Player of the match: Dhananjaya de Silva (SL)

- Sri Lanka won the toss and elected to bat.
- Oman were eliminated as a result of this match.

1 July 2023
09:00
Scorecard

West Indies; 181 (43.5 overs)	v	Scotland; 185/3 (43.3 overs)
Jason Holder 45 (79); Brandon McMullen 3/32 (9 overs)		Matthew Cross 74* (107); Akeal Hosein 1/26 (10 overs)

Scotland won by 7 wickets
Harare Sports Club, Harare
Umpires: Sam Nogajski (Aus) and Alex Wharf (Eng)
Player of the match: Brandon McMullen (Sco)

- Scotland won the toss and elected to field.
- West Indies were eliminated as a result of this match.
- This was the first time West Indies have not qualified for the World Cup.

2 July 2023
09:00
Scorecard

Zimbabwe; 165 (32.2 overs)	v	Sri Lanka; 169/1 (33.1 overs)
Sean Williams 56 (57); Maheesh Theekshana 4/25 (8.2 overs)		Pathum Nissanka 101* (102); Richard Ngarava 1/35 (7 overs)

Sri Lanka won by 9 wickets
Queens Sports Club, Bulawayo
Umpires: Roland Black (Ire) and Leslie Reifer (WI)
Player of the match: Maheesh Theekshana (SL)

- Sri Lanka won the toss and elected to field.
- Sri Lanka qualified for the World Cup as a result of this match.

3 July 2023
09:00
Scorecard

Netherlands; 362/7 (48 overs)	v	Oman; 246/6 (44 overs)
Vikramjit Singh 110 (109); Bilal Khan 3/75 (10 overs)		Ayaan Khan 105* (92); Aryan Dutt 3/31 (10 overs)

Netherlands won by 74 runs (DLS method)
Harare Sports Club, Harare
Umpires: Iknow Chabi (Zim) and Ahmed Shah Pakteen (Afg)
Player of the match: Vikramjit Singh (Ned)

- Oman won the toss and elected to field.
- The match was reduced to 48 overs per side due to rain.
- Oman were set a revised target of 364 runs from 48 overs due to rain.
- Bad light prevented any further play.
- Vikramjit Singh (Ned) and Ayaan Khan (Oma) both scored their first centuries in ODIs.

4 July 2023
09:00
Scorecard

Scotland; 234/8 (50 overs)	v	Zimbabwe; 203 (41.1 overs)
Michael Leask 48 (34); Sean Williams 3/41 (10 overs)		Ryan Burl 83 (84); Chris Sole 3/33 (7 overs)

Scotland won by 31 runs
Queens Sports Club, Bulawayo
Umpires: Allahudien Paleker (SA) and Asif Yaqoob (Pak)
Player of the match: Chris Sole (Sco)

- Zimbabwe won the toss and elected to field.
- Zimbabwe were eliminated as a result of this match.

5 July 2023
09:00
Scorecard

Oman; 221/9 (50 overs)	v	West Indies; 222/3 (39.4 overs)
Suraj Kumar 53* (65); Romario Shepherd 3/44 (10 overs)		Brandon King 100 (104); Kaleemullah 1/49 (9 overs)

West Indies won by 7 wickets
Harare Sports Club, Harare
Umpires: Aleem Dar (Pak) and Raveendra Wimalasiri (SL)
Player of the match: Brandon King (WI)

- West Indies won the toss and elected to field.

6 July 2023
09:00
Scorecard

Scotland; 277/9 (50 overs)	v	Netherlands; 278/6 (42.5 overs)
Brandon McMullen 106 (110); Bas de Leede 5/52 (10)		Bas de Leede 123 (92); Michael Leask 2/42 (8 overs)

Netherlands won by 4 wickets
Queens Sports Club, Bulawayo
Umpires: Bongani Jele (SA) and Allahudien Paleker (SA)
Player of the match: Bas de Leede (Ned)

- Netherlands won the toss and elected to field.
- Netherlands qualified for the World Cup as a result of this match.
- Scotland were eliminated as a result of this match.
- Bas de Leede took his first five-wicket haul and scored his first century in ODI cricket. He became the fourth player to score a century and take a five-wicket haul in the same men's ODI.

7 July 2023
09:00
Scorecard

West Indies; 243 (48.1 overs)	v	Sri Lanka; 244/2 (44.2 overs)
Keacy Carty 87 (96); Maheesh Theekshana 4/34 (10 overs)		Pathum Nissanka 104 (113); Kevin Sinclair 1/52 (10 overs)

Sri Lanka won by 8 wickets
Harare Sports Club, Harare
Umpires: Wayne Knights (NZ) and Langton Rusere (Zim)
Player of the match: Maheesh Theekshana (SL)

- Sri Lanka won the toss and elected to field.
- Sahan Arachchige (SL) made his ODI debut.

== Final ==
9 July 2023
09:00
Scorecard

Sri Lanka; 233 (47.5 overs)	v	Netherlands; 105 (23.3 overs)
Sahan Arachchige 57 (71); Vikramjit Singh 2/12 (4 overs)		Max O'Dowd 33 (63); Maheesh Theekshana 4/31 (6.3 overs)

Sri Lanka won by 128 runs
Harare Sports Club, Harare
Umpires: Gregory Brathwaite (WI) and Alex Wharf (Eng)
Player of the match: Dilshan Madushanka (SL)

- Netherlands won the toss and elected to field.
- Noah Croes (Ned) made his ODI debut.

== Final standings ==
Position	Team	Result
1st	Sri Lanka	Qualified for the 2023 Cricket World Cup
2nd	Netherlands	Qualified for the 2023 Cricket World Cup
3rd	Scotland	
4th	Zimbabwe	
5th	West Indies	
6th	Oman	
7th	Ireland	
8th	Nepal	
9th	United Arab Emirates	
10th	United States	

== Team of the tournament ==
The ICC named the following players in the team of the tournament:

- (Sri Lanka) Pathum Nissanka
- (Netherlands) Vikramjit Singh
- (Scotland) Brandon McMullen
- (Zimbabwe) Sean Williams
- (Netherlands) Bas de Leede
- (Zimbabwe) Sikandar Raza
- (Netherlands) Scott Edwards (c, wk)
- (Sri Lanka) Wanindu Hasaranga
- (Sri Lanka) Maheesh Theekshana
- (Scotland) Chris Sole
- (Zimbabwe) Richard Ngarava

== See also ==
- 2021–2023 ICC World Test Championship
- 2023 Cricket World Cup
- 2020–2023 ICC Cricket World Cup Super League
- 2019–2023 ICC Cricket World Cup League 2
- 2019–2022 ICC Cricket World Cup Challenge League
- 2023 Cricket World Cup Qualifier Play-off
- 2027 Cricket World Cup
