= James Dickinson (cricketer) =

Scottish cricketer (born 1998)

Jamie Dickinson
Personal information
- Full name: James William Dickinson
- Born: 14 September 1998 (age 28); Edinburgh, Scotland
- Batting: Right-handed
- Bowling: Right-arm leg break
- Role: Bowler

International information
- National side: Scotland (2024–present)
- Only T20I (cap 58): 13 March 2024 v United Arab Emirates

Domestic team information
- Years: Team
- 2018: Leicestershire

Career statistics
Competition	T20I	LA	T20
Matches	1	1	1
Runs scored	15	0	15
Batting average	15.00	0.00	15.00
100s/50s	0/0	0/0	0/0
Top score	15	0	15
Balls bowled	24	60	24
Wickets	1	1	1
Bowling average	23.00	87.00	23.00
5 wickets in innings	0	0	0
10 wickets in match	0	0	0
Best bowling	1/23	1/87	1/23
Catches/stumpings	1/–	0/–	1/–
- Source: Cricinfo, 5 August 2024

James William Dickinson (born 14 September 1998) is a Scottish cricketer. He made his List A debut for Leicestershire against India A in a tri-series warm-up match on 19 June 2018.

== International career ==
In February 2024, he was named in Scotland's T20I squad for the series against UAE. He made his Twenty20 International debut against United Arab Emirates at Dubai International Cricket Stadium, on 13 March 2024.
