= Scott Currie =

English cricketer (born 2001)

Personal information
- Full name: Scott William Currie
- Born: 2 May 2001 (age 25); Poole, Dorset, England
- Height: 1.96 m (6 ft 5 in)
- Batting: Right-handed
- Bowling: Right-arm medium-fast
- Role: All Rounder
- Relatives: Brad Currie (brother); Dean Hawkshaw (cousin)

International information
- National side: Scotland (2024)
- ODI debut (cap 79): 1 March 2024 v Canada
- Last ODI: 7 March 2024 v Canada

Domestic team information
- Years: Team
- 2020–present: Hampshire (squad no. 44)
- 2023–2024: → Leicestershire (loan) (squad no. 32)
- 2024–2025: Manchester Originals
- 2025/26: Dubai Capitals
- 2026: Birmingham Phoenix

Career statistics
Competition	ODI	FC	LA	T20
Matches	3	23	30	91
Runs scored	10	555	277	224
Batting average	5.00	19.82	21.89	11.78
100s/50s	0/0	1/1	0/1	0/0
Top score	5	120	61*	26*
Balls bowled	120	2,946	1,256	1,768
Wickets	3	53	53	128
Bowling average	28.66	34.90	22.15	19.67
5 wickets in innings	0	1	1	0
10 wickets in match	0	0	0	0
Best bowling	2/16	5/64	5/34	4/18
Catches/stumpings	0/–	25/–	22/–	39/–
- Source: Cricinfo, 26 September 2026

Scott William Currie (born 2 May 2001) is an English cricketer who has previously played for Scotland cricket team.

== Domestic career ==
He made his Twenty20 debut on 27 August 2020, for Hampshire in the 2020 T20 Blast. He made his first-class debut on 6 September 2020, for Hampshire in the 2020 Bob Willis Trophy. He made his List A debut on 22 July 2021, for Hampshire in the 2021 Royal London One-Day Cup. Currie signed a new three-year contract with Hampshire in December 2024.

== International career ==
=== England ===
Prior to his T20 debut, he was named in England's squad for the 2020 Under-19 Cricket World Cup.

On 14 September 2025 it was announced Currie was called up for England to face Ireland in a T20I series.

=== Scotland ===
In February 2024, Currie was named in the Scotland squad to face Canada and the United Arab Emirates for the 2024 United Arab Emirates Tri-Nation Series which formed part of 2024–2026 Cricket World Cup League 2 alongside his Hampshire teammate Brad Wheal and his brother Brad Currie. He took 3 wickets in 3 matches, and had a top score of 5 with the bat.
