= Ashwanth Valthapa =

Emirati cricketer (born 2001)

Personal information
- Full name: Ashwanth Chidambaram Valthapa
- Born: 16 June 2001 (age 25); Chennai, Tamil Nadu, India
- Batting: Left-handed
- Role: Wicket-keeper

International information
- National side: United Arab Emirates (2023-present)
- ODI debut (cap 98): 12 March 2023 v Nepal
- Last ODI: 16 March 2023 v Nepal
- Only T20I (cap 78): 14 March 2024 v Scotland

Domestic team information
- Years: Team
- 2023: Gulf Giants

Career statistics
Competition	ODI	LA
Matches	3	6
Runs scored	14	81
Batting average	14.00	20.25
100s/50s	0/0	0/0
Top score	14	46
Catches/stumpings	3/1	4/2
- Source: Cricinfo, 14 March 2024

Ashwanth Chidambaram Valthapa (born 16 June 2001) is an Indian-born Emirati cricketer who plays for the United Arab Emirates cricket team.

== Career ==
In March 2023, he was named in UAE's ODI squad for the 2023 Nepal Tri-Nation Series which was part of the 2019–2023 ICC Cricket World Cup League 2. He made his One Day International debut against Nepal, on 12 March 2023.

He also played several matches for Gulf Giants in International League T20 (ILT20) in 2023.

In March 2024, he was named in the T20I squad for the series against Scotland. He made his Twenty20 International debut against Scotland in the same series, on 14 March 2024.
