= Tom Mackintosh (cricketer) =

Scottish cricketer (born 2003)

Personal information
- Full name: Tomas Scott Sabater Mackintosh
- Born: 11 January 2003 (age 23); Madrid, Spain
- Batting: Right-handed
- Role: Wicket-keeper

International information
- National side: Scotland (2023–2023)
- ODI debut (cap 76): 17 February 2023 v Nepal
- Last ODI: 6 July 2023 v Netherlands
- T20I debut (cap 56): 25 July 2023 v Austria
- Last T20I: 27 July 2023 v Denmark

Domestic team information
- Years: Team
- 2022–2023: Durham (squad no. 14)

Career statistics
Competition	ODI	T20I	FC	LA
Matches	10	2	4	21
Runs scored	169	16	90	391
Batting average	21.12	16.00	22.50	21.72
100s/50s	0/0	0/0	0/1	0/1
Top score	38*	16	51	53
Catches/stumpings	2/–	2/0	21/–	9/0
- Source: Cricinfo, 29 September 2023

Tomas Scott Sabater Mackintosh (born 11 January 2003) is a former Scottish cricketer who played as a wicket-keeper batsman. He made his ODI debut on 17 February 2023 against Nepal at Tribhuvan University International Cricket Ground. On his debut, he scored 19 runs while batting at number three. Mackintosh scored 38 runs in the last ODI he played against Netherlands at 2023 Cricket World Cup Qualifier.
