= Simon Smith (cricketer) =

Personal information
- Full name: Simon James Stevenson Smith
- Born: 8 December 1979 (age 46); Ashington, Northumberland, England
- Batting: Right-handed
- Role: Wicket-keeper

International information
- National side: Scotland
- T20I debut (cap 21): 1 February 2010 v Kenya
- Last T20I: 13 March 2012 v Canada

Career statistics
Competition	T20I	FC	LA	T20
Matches	5	12	12	7
Runs scored	21	286	103	24
Batting average	7.00	31.77	17.16	8.00
100s/50s	0/0	0/1	0/0	0/0
Top score	9	54	41*	9
Catches/stumpings	0/1	31/1	7/5	2/2
- Source: CricketArchive, 26 January 2025

Simon James Stevenson Smith (born 8 December 1979) is a Scottish former international cricketer. A wicket-keeper, Smith was the understudy to Colin Smith and appeared in the Intercontinental Cup for Scotland. His maiden first-class game was against Ireland in 2004.
