= List of Scotland Twenty20 International cricketers =

A Twenty20 International (T20I) is an international cricket match between two teams that have official ODI status, as determined by the International Cricket Council. It is played under the rules of Twenty20 cricket and is the shortest form of the game. The Scotland national cricket team played its first T20I match on 12 September 2007, against Pakistan as part of the 2007 ICC World Twenty20, losing the match by 51 runs.

This list comprises all members of the Scotland cricket team who have played at least one T20I match. It is initially arranged in the order in which each player won his first Twenty20 cap. Where more than one player won his first Twenty20 cap in the same match, those players are listed alphabetically by surname.

== Key ==
General

- ‡ – Captain
- † – Wicket-keeper
- First – Year of debut
- Last – Year of latest game
- Mat – Number of matches played

Batting

- Runs – Runs scored in career
- HS – Highest score
- Avg – Runs scored per dismissal
- * – Batsman remained not out
- 50 – Number of half centuries
- 100 – Centuries scored

Bowling

- Balls – Balls bowled in career
- Wkt – Wickets taken in career
- BBI – Best bowling in an innings
- Ave – Average runs per wicket

Fielding

- Ca – Catches taken
- St – Stumpings taken

== Players ==
Statistics are correct as of 18 April 2026.

Scotland T20I cricketers
General					Batting					Bowling				Fielding		Ref(s)
Cap	Name	First	Last	Mat	Runs	HS	Avg	50	100	Balls	Wkt	BBI	Ave	Ca	St	Ref(s)
1	John Blain	2007	2008	6	4	3*	2.00	0	0	120	6	2/23	18.00	1	0	
2	Dougie Brown	2007	2007	2	1	1	1.00	0	0	24	0	–	–	0	0	
3	Gavin Hamilton ‡	2007	2010	12	90	32	11.25	0	0	–	–	–	–	3	0	
4	Majid Haq	2007	2013	21	64	21*	12.80	0	0	450	28	3/20	16.85	4	0	
5	Neil McCallum	2007	2010	11	76	38	10.85	0	0	–	–	–	–	0	0	
6	Dewald Nel	2007	2010	10	34	13*	15.50	0	0	186	12	3/10	14.08	1	0	
7	Navdeep Poonia	2007	2010	8	95	38*	19.00	0	0	–	–	–	–	2	0	
8	Colin Smith †	2007	2009	8	58	46*	11.60	0	0	–	–	–	–	5	4	
9	Ryan Watson ‡	2007	2010	10	159	54	17.66	1	0	60	3	1/4	30.66	4	0	
10	Fraser Watts	2007	2012	11	137	46	15.22	0	0	–	–	–	–	6	0	
11	Craig Wright	2007	2009	3	14	14	14.00	0	0	30	4	3/29	12.25	1	0	
12	Richie Berrington ‡	2008	2026	108	2,504	100	30.91	10	1	518	28	3/17	23.57	23	0	
13	Kyle Coetzer ‡	2008	2021	70	1,495	89	22.65	6	0	66	5	3/25	14.20	22	0	
14	Gordon Drummond ‡	2008	2013	17	54	35	7.71	0	0	330	16	3/20	23.81	2	0	
15	Gregor Maiden	2008	2008	3	0	0	0.00	0	0	0	2	1/20	29.00	1	0	
16	Glenn Rogers	2008	2009	2	7	6*	–	0	0	47	2	2/15	33.50	0	0	
17	Calum MacLeod	2009	2022	64	1,238	74	23.80	7	0	180	5	2/17	44.00	38	0	
18	Jan Stander	2009	2012	11	94	45	10.44	0	0	81	3	2/24	52.00	2	0	
19	Gordon Goudie	2010	2013	9	25	9*	6.25	0	0	149	7	3/22	32.00	4	0	
20	Ross Lyons	2010	2010	2	4	4	2.00	0	0	36	1	1/26	40.00	0	0	
21	Simon Smith †	2010	2012	5	21	9	7.00	0	0	–	–	–	–	0	1	
22	Ryan Flannigan	2012	2012	4	38	18	12.66	0	0	–	–	–	–	0	0	
23	Preston Mommsen ‡	2012	2016	24	419	68*	34.91	2	0	138	4	1/23	41.00	11	0	
24	Safyaan Sharif	2012	2026	78	193	26	12.06	0	0	1,570	87	4/24	24.41	17	0	
25	Craig Wallace †	2012	2021	21	173	27	17.30	0	0	–	–	–	–	7	2	
26	Matthew Parker	2012	2012	2	–	–	–	–	–	36	1	1/36	61.00	0	0	
27	Moneeb Iqbal	2012	2013	6	46	31	15.33	0	0	48	2	2/15	29.50	3	0	
28	Josh Davey	2012	2022	31	115	24	14.37	0	0	653	37	4/18	23.97	15	0	
29	Neil Carter	2013	2013	7	4	3	2.00	0	0	156	6	2/27	28.00	1	0	
30	Matt Machan	2013	2016	13	407	67*	40.70	3	0	135	5	3/23	31.20	7	0	
31	David Murphy †	2013	2013	4	35	20	35.00	0	0	–	–	–	–	1	0	
32	Iain Wardlaw	2013	2013	4	1	1	1.00	0	0	145	9	3/40	16.11	0	0	
33	Freddie Coleman	2013	2013	1	9	9	9.00	0	0	–	–	–	–	0	0	
34	Matthew Cross ‡†	2013	2026	89	1,439	66*	23.20	5	0	–	–	–	–	49	16	
35	Michael Leask	2013	2026	80	901	58	15.80	1	0	999	59	4/17	21.27	32	0	
36	Calvin Burnett	2013	2013	1	–	–	–	–	–	24	3	3/18	6.00	0	0	
37	Robert Taylor	2013	2016	9	85	41*	28.33	0	0	150	5	3/17	39.20	8	0	
38	Alasdair Evans	2015	2022	35	10	8	1.25	0	0	720	41	5/24	23.26	11	0	
39	George Munsey	2015	2026	88	2,598	132	32.07	14	3	–	–	–	–	40	0	
40	Mark Watt	2015	2026	83	321	31*	11.06	0	0	1,747	94	5/27	21.98	18	0	
41	Con de Lange	2015	2017	8	35	22	11.66	0	0	162	8	2/17	21.37	3	0	
42	Gavin Main	2015	2024	16	12	12*	12.00	0	0	242	19	5/26	18.00	3	0	
43	Brad Wheal	2017	2026	26	20	8*	6.66	0	0	518	24	3/20	30.95	10	0	
44	Chris Sole	2017	2024	17	21	6	7.00	0	0	337	15	3/28	35.06	5	0	
45	Dylan Budge	2018	2021	8	60	24	15.00	0	0	6	1	1/18	18.00	4	0	
46	Hamza Tahir	2018	2024	17	3	3*	3.00	0	0	372	23	4/30	22.26	5	0	
47	Stuart Whittingham	2018	2018	3	–	–	–	–	–	60	3	2/33	26.33	0	0	
48	Ruaidhri Smith	2019	2019	2	9	9*	–	0	0	41	0	–	–	0	0	
49	Adrian Neill	2019	2019	5	–	–	–	–	–	120	9	3/21	17.11	4	0	
50	Oli Hairs	2019	2025	30	504	127*	18.66	2	1	12	1	1/19	19.00	4	0	
51	Tom Sole	2019	2019	9	69	33*	17.25	0	0	126	6	2/15	22.83	5	0	
52	Chris Greaves	2021	2025	35	290	45	19.33	0	0	480	27	3/26	22.62	13	0	
53	Michael Jones	2022	2026	15	366	86	26.14	2	0	–	–	–	–	10	0	
54	Brad Currie	2023	2026	22	19	8*	9.50	0	0	450	32	5/13	13.78	10	0	
55	Brandon McMullen	2023	2026	30	787	96	31.48	7	0	245	8	2/33	46.25	16	0	
56	Tom Mackintosh	2023	2023	2	16	16	16.00	0	0	–	–	–	–	2	0	
57	Jack Jarvis	2024	2026	9	92	32*	15.33	0	0	160	11	3/14	21.45	2	0	
58	James Dickinson	2024	2024	1	15	15	15.00	0	0	24	1	1/23	23.00	1	0	
59	Charlie Tear †	2024	2025	8	87	32	12.42	0	0	–	–	–	–	4	1	
60	Charlie Cassell	2024	2025	2	3	2*	3.00	0	0	30	2	2/46	32.50	3	0	
61	Jasper Davidson	2024	2026	6	7	4*	–	0	0	126	9	3/51	18.66	1	0	
62	Christopher McBride	2025	2026	6	31	17	10.33	0	0	6	0	–	–	1	0	
63	Finlay McCreath	2025	2026	7	94	40	13.42	0	0	–	–	–	–	5	0	
64	Liam Naylor	2025	2025	2	8	7	4.00	0	0	–	–	–	–	1	0	
65	Mackenzie Jones	2025	2026	3	9	9	9.00	0	0	60	6	4/22	13.00	0	0	
66	Tom Bruce (Note: Tom Bruce also played for New Zealand. Only his records for Scotland are given above.)	2026	2026	4	65	35	16.25	0	0	–	–	–	–	2	0	
67	Oliver Davidson	2026	2026	6	37	20*	18.50	0	0	108	5	1/12	26.60	1	0	
68	Zainullah Ihsan	2026	2026	2	–	–	–	–	–	42	1	1/42	76.00	0	0	
69	Owen Gould †	2026	2026	2	39	24	19.50	0	0	–	–	–	–	1	0	

== See also ==
- Twenty20 International
- Scotland national cricket team
- List of Scottish ODI cricketers
