= Owen Dawkins =

English cricketer

Personal information
- Full name: Owen Alun Dawkins
- Born: 23 November 1978 (age 47); Cheltenham, Gloucestershire, England
- Batting: Right-handed
- Bowling: Leg break

Domestic team information
- Years: Team
- 2006: Buckinghamshire
- 2005: Hertfordshire
- 2001–2004: Wales Minor Counties
- 2000: Hertfordshire

Career statistics
Competition	LA
Matches	5
Runs scored	29
Batting average	9.66
100s/50s	–/–
Top score	18
Balls bowled	66
Wickets	1
Bowling average	81.00
5 wickets in innings	–
10 wickets in match	–
Best bowling	1/21
Catches/stumpings	2/–
- Source: Cricinfo, 1 January 2011

Owen Alun Dawkins (born 23 November 1978) is an English cricket coach and former cricketer who has served as the head coach of Scotland national cricket team since December 2025. Previously, he worked as a coach for Gloucestershire.

== Career ==
Dawkins made his debut in Minor counties cricket for Hertfordshire, playing 2 matches for the county in the MCCA Knockout Trophy against the Middlesex Cricket Board and Suffolk.

The following season, Dawkins made his Minor Counties Championship debut for Wales Minor Counties against Oxfordshire. From 2001 to 2003, he represented the team in 17 Championship matches, the last of which came against Oxfordshire. His MCCA Knockout Trophy debut for the team came in 2001 against the Worcestershire Cricket Board. From 2001 to 2004, he represented the team in 9 Trophy matches, the last of which came against Berkshire. His debut List A appearance for the team came in the 2nd round of the 2002 Cheltenham & Gloucester Trophy against the Sussex Cricket Board, with the match being played in 2001. From 2001 to 2004, he represented the team in 5 List A matches, the last of which came against Middlesex in the 2nd round of the 2004 Cheltenham & Gloucester Trophy. In his 5 List A matches, he scored 29 runs at a batting average of 9.66, with a high score of 18. With the ball he took a single wickets at a bowling average of 81.00, with best figures of 1/21.

In 2005, he briefly rejoined Hertfordshire, before representing Buckinghamshire in 2 MCCA Knockout Trophy matches against Wiltshire and Hertfordshire. He also played club cricket for Sully Centurions Cricket Club in the South Wales Cricket League.

Previously, Dawkins played for nine first-class counties Second XI teams between 1997 and 2010.
