= Gregor Maiden =

Personal information
- Full name: Gregor Ian Maiden
- Born: 22 July 1979 (age 47); Glasgow, Scotland
- Batting: Right-handed
- Bowling: Right-arm off break
- Role: Wicketkeeper

International information
- National side: Scotland
- ODI debut (cap 41): 15 June 2010 v Netherlands
- Last ODI: 13 July 2011 v Sri Lanka
- T20I debut (cap 15): 2 August 2008 v Ireland
- Last T20I: 4 August 2010 v Kenya

Domestic team information
- Years: Team
- 2003: Lancashire

Career statistics
Competition	ODI	T20I	FC	LA
Matches	7	3	8	60
Runs scored	84	0	118	533
Batting average	21.00	0.00	11.80	14.02
100s/50s	0/0	0/0	0/0	0/1
Top score	31	0	40	62
Balls bowled	48	60	445	1,338
Wickets	0	2	11	23
Bowling average	–	29.00	21.72	47.56
5 wickets in innings	–	0	0	0
10 wickets in match	–	0	0	0
Best bowling	–	1/20	3/24	2/27
Catches/stumpings	5/–	1/–	5/–	22/3
- Source: CricketArchive, 25 January 2025

Gregor Ian Maiden (born 22 July 1979) is a Scottish former cricketer who played for Scotland. During the 2003 season he played for Lancashire.

Maiden was born in Glasgow and attended Hutchesons' Grammar School, before going on to study at Loughborough University along with fellow Scotland cricketers Fraser Watts and Simon Smith. After three years, he graduated with a 2.1 honours degree in Sports Science.

A frontline batter and off-spin bowler, Gregor had a nomadic club career, having spells with several clubs in the West of Scotland and a brief stint at Lancashire (he suffered a cruciate ligament injury shortly after signing for them), until in 2004 he signed for the popular Grange club in Edinburgh, where he has played since.

In his only List A appearance for Lancashire CCC, in 2003 vs India 'A', his stand of 130 (Maiden scored 62) alongside Chris Schofield created a List A World Record for the Highest 9th Wicket Partnership. The record has since been beaten by Chris Read and Andrew Harris in 2006.

After his cricketing career, Maiden worked in the banking sector in Edinburgh.
