= Hamza Tahir =

Scottish cricketer

Personal information
- Born: 9 November 1995 (age 31); Paisley, Renfrewshire, Scotland
- Batting: Right-handed
- Bowling: Slow left-arm orthodox
- Role: Spin bowler
- Relatives: Majid Haq (cousin)

International information
- National side: Scotland
- ODI debut (cap 69): 17 August 2019 v PNG
- Last ODI: 17 February 2023 v Nepal
- T20I debut (cap 49): 12 June 2018 v Pakistan
- Last T20I: 14 March 2024 v UAE

Career statistics
Competition	ODI	T20I	LA	T20
Matches	31	17	32	17
Runs scored	26	3	26	3
Batting average	4.33	3.00	3.71	3.00
100s/50s	0/0	0/0	0/0	0/0
Top score	13	3*	13	3*
Balls bowled	1,316	372	1,508	372
Wickets	40	23	40	23
Bowling average	25.82	22.26	26.60	22.26
5 wickets in innings	1	0	1	0
10 wickets in match	0	0	0	0
Best bowling	5/38	4/30	5/38	4/30
Catches/stumpings	5/–	5/–	5/–	5/–
- Source: Cricinfo, 5 August 2024

Hamza Tahir (born 9 November 1995) is a former Scottish cricketer. He made his Twenty20 International (T20I) debut for Scotland against Pakistan on 12 June 2018. He made his List A debut for Scotland against Oman on 20 February 2019, following the 2018–19 Oman Quadrangular Series. He was born in Paisley to Pakistani parents.

In June 2019, he was selected to represent Scotland A in their tour to Ireland to play the Ireland Wolves. The next month, he was selected to play for the Glasgow Giants in the inaugural edition of the Euro T20 Slam cricket tournament. However, the following month the tournament was cancelled, reportedly after the organizers ran into financial difficulties.

He was part of Scotland's One Day International (ODI) squad for the 2019 Scotland Tri-Nation Series. He made his ODI debut for Scotland, against Papua New Guinea, on 17 August 2019. In his next match, against Oman, he took his first five-wicket haul in ODI cricket.

In September 2019, he was named in Scotland's squad for the 2019 ICC T20 World Cup Qualifier tournament in the United Arab Emirates. In September 2021, Tahir was named in Scotland's provisional squad for the 2021 ICC Men's T20 World Cup.

In June 2024, Tahir announced his retirement at age 28 from professional cricket after being dismissed from the Scotland national team. He blamed racism as the reason for his retirement. He also threatened to take legal action against Cricket Scotland. A spokesperson for Cricket Scotland said Tahir was a "tremendous servant to the Scotland men's national team."
