= Oli Hairs =

Scottish cricketer

Personal information
- Full name: Oliver James Hairs
- Born: 14 April 1991 (age 35); Redhill, Surrey, England
- Batting: Left-handed
- Bowling: Right-arm off break

International information
- National side: Scotland
- ODI debut (cap 44): 1 July 2010 v Netherlands
- Last ODI: 9 July 2010 v Afghanistan
- T20I debut (cap 50): 16 September 2019 v Netherlands
- Last T20I: 11 July 2025 v Jersey

Career statistics
Competition	ODI	T20I	LA	T20
Matches	5	30	8	30
Runs scored	68	504	130	504
Batting average	13.60	18.66	16.25	18.66
100s/50s	0/0	1/2	0/0	1/2
Top score	27	127*	27	127*
Catches/stumpings	0/–	4/–	0/–	4/–
- Source: Cricinfo, 9 August 2025

Oliver James Hairs (born 14 April 1991) is a Scottish cricketer. He has played for the Scotland national cricket team since 2010, as a left-handed batsman.

== Personal life ==
Hairs was born on 14 April 1991 in Redhill, Surrey, England. He attended Merchiston Castle School in Edinburgh, Scotland.

== Domestic and franchise career ==
Hairs played his early club cricket for The Grange Club in Edinburgh. He also played for the Eastern Knights in the Regional Pro Series.

In July 2019, he was selected to play for the Edinburgh Rocks in the inaugural edition of the Euro T20 Slam cricket tournament. However, the following month the tournament was cancelled.

== International career ==
Hairs made his One Day International (ODI) debut against the Netherlands in 2010. In June 2019, he was selected to represent Scotland A in their tour to Ireland to play the Ireland Wolves. He made his Twenty20 debut for Scotland A against the Ireland Wolves on 9 June 2019.

In September 2019, he was named in Scotland's squad for the 2019–20 Ireland Tri-Nation Series and the 2019 ICC T20 World Cup Qualifier tournament in the United Arab Emirates. He made his T20I debut for Scotland, against the Netherlands, on 16 September 2019. In September 2021, Hairs was named in Scotland's provisional squad for the 2021 ICC Men's T20 World Cup.

In May 2024, he was named in Scotland’s squad for the 2024 ICC Men's T20 World Cup tournament.
