= Jack Jarvis (cricketer) =

Scottish cricketer (born 2003)

Personal information
- Full name: Jack Alexander Jarvis
- Born: 29 May 2003 (age 23); Livingston, Scotland
- Batting: Right-handed
- Bowling: Right-arm medium-fast
- Role: Bowler

International information
- National side: Scotland (2023–present)
- ODI debut (cap 75): 17 February 2023 v Nepal
- Last ODI: 13 August 2026 v Canada
- T20I debut (cap 57): 11 March 2024 v United Arab Emirates
- Last T20I: 17 April 2026 v Namibia

Career statistics
Competition	ODI	T20I	LA	T20
Matches	23	9	26	20
Runs scored	135	92	165	92
Batting average	10.38	15.33	11.00	11.50
100s/50s	0/0	0/0	0/0	0/0
Top score	30	32*	30	32*
Balls bowled	755	160	869	292
Wickets	27	11	30	22
Bowling average	25.81	21.45	27.40	19.13
5 wickets in innings	0	0	0	0
10 wickets in match	0	0	0	0
Best bowling	4/40	3/14	4/40	4/34
Catches/stumpings	7/–	2/–	7/–	7/–
- Source: Cricinfo, 25 September 2026

Jack Alexander Jarvis (born 29 May 2003) is a Scottish cricketer who plays as a medium fast bowler.

Playing alongside his father, Jarvis started off playing for Livingston Cricket Club in West Lothian.

== International career ==
In January 2023, he was named in national squad for the 2023 Nepal Tri-Nation Series which was part of 2019–2023 ICC Cricket World Cup League 2. He made his One Day International debut on 17 February 2023 against Nepal at Tribhuvan University International Cricket Ground. In May 2023, he was named in Scotland's 15-member squad for 2023 Cricket World Cup Qualifier.

In February 2024, he was named in Scotland's T20I squad for the series against UAE. He made his Twenty20 International debut against United Arab Emirates at Dubai International Cricket Stadium, on 11 March 2024.

In May 2024, he was named in Scotland’s squad for the 2024 ICC Men's T20 World Cup tournament.
