= Charlie Tear =

Scottish cricketer (born 2004)

Personal information
- Full name: Charles Joseph Tear
- Born: 12 June 2004 (age 22); Chichester, West Sussex, England
- Batting: Right-handed
- Role: Wicket-keeper

International information
- National side: Scotland (2024–present)
- ODI debut (cap 81): 3 March 2024 v United Arab Emirates
- Last ODI: 4 September 2025 v Namibia
- T20I debut (cap 59): 13 March 2024 v United Arab Emirates
- Last T20I: 11 July 2025 v Jersey

Domestic team information
- Years: Team
- 2022–present: Sussex (squad no. 28)
- 2024: → Gloucestershire (on loan) (squad no. 28)

Career statistics
| Competition | ODI | T20I | FC | LA |
|---|---|---|---|---|
| Matches | 20 | 8 | 12 | 40 |
| Runs scored | 489 | 87 | 585 | 1,182 |
| Batting average | 30.56 | 12.42 | 27.85 | 32.83 |
| 100s/50s | 0/4 | 0/0 | 0/4 | 3/5 |
| Top score | 80 | 32 | 89 | 159 |
| Catches/stumpings | 5/0 | 4/1 | 8/0 | 21/2 |
- Source: Cricinfo, 26 September 2026

Charles Joseph Tear (born 12 June 2004) is a Scottish cricketer who played as wicket-keeper-batter for Scotland. He also played for Scotland national under-19 cricket team in the 2022 Under-19 Men's Cricket World Cup.

== Early life ==
He was educated at Seaford College, where he received coaching from former Sussex captain Chris Adams.

== Domestic career ==
In May 2022, Tear signed his first professional contract with Sussex. He made his first-class debut for Sussex against Durham in 2022 County Championship on 20 September 2022. He made his List A debut for Sussex against Gloucestershire in 2022 One-Day Cup on 18 August 2023.

In April 2024 Gloucestershire signed him on loan from Sussex for two weeks.

== International career ==
In February 2024, he was named in Scotland's ODI squad for the 2024 United Arab Emirates Tri-Nation Series which was the part of 2024–2026 Cricket World Cup League 2. He made his One Day International debut against United Arab Emirates on 3 March 2024, in ICC Cricket World Cup League 2. In the same month he was named in Scotland's T20I squad for the series against UAE. He made his Twenty20 International debut against United Arab Emirates at Dubai International Cricket Stadium, on 13 March 2024.

In May 2024, he was named in Scotland’s squad for the 2024 ICC Men's T20 World Cup tournament.
