= Brandon McMullen =

South African-born Scottish cricketer (born 1999)

Personal information
- Born: 18 October 1999 (age 27); Durban, South Africa
- Batting: Right-handed
- Bowling: Right-arm medium
- Role: All-rounder

International information
- National side: Scotland (2022–present)
- ODI debut (cap 74): 1 December 2022 v Namibia
- Last ODI: 13 August 2026 v Canada
- T20I debut (cap 55): 20 July 2023 v Germany
- Last T20I: 18 April 2026 v Namibia

Domestic team information
- Years: Team
- 2025: Dubai Capitals
- 2025: Hampshire
- 2025/26: Abu Dhabi Knight Riders
- 2026: Edinburgh Castle Rockers

Career statistics
Competition	ODI	T20I	LA	T20
Matches	47	30	54	54
Runs scored	1,572	787	1,777	1,366
Batting average	42.48	31.48	41.32	32.52
100s/50s	5/7	0/7	6/7	0/11
Top score	151	96	151	96
Balls bowled	1,961	245	2,219	281
Wickets	68	8	72	11
Bowling average	21.86	46.25	23.45	38.00
5 wickets in innings	1	0	1	0
10 wickets in match	0	0	0	0
Best bowling	5/34	2/33	5/34	2/11
Catches/stumpings	27/–	16/–	29/–	25/–
- Source: Cricinfo, 25 September 2026

Brandon McMullen (born 18 October 1999) is a South African-born Scottish cricketer. He made his international debut for Scotland in 2022. He is an all-rounder who bats right-handed and bowls right-arm medium pace.

== Personal life ==
McMullen was born on 18 October 1999 in Durban, South Africa. He attended Clifton Preparatory School and Hilton College where he captained the school cricket team.

== Domestic career ==
In South Africa, McMullen played at under-19 level for KwaZulu-Natal Inland and Dolphins. He moved to Scotland in 2018 to play club cricket for Stirling County Cricket Club and regional cricket for Western Warriors.

== Nepal Premier League ==
In 2024, he was signed by Sudurpaschim Royals for the Nepal Premier League inaugural season.

== International career ==
After qualifying for Scotland on residency grounds, McMullen was called up to Scotland's senior squad for the 2022 ICC Men's T20 World Cup in Australia.

McMullen made his One Day International (ODI) debut for Scotland against Namibia in December 2022, as part of the ICC Cricket World Cup League 2.

At the 2023 Cricket World Cup Qualifier in Zimbabwe, McMullen recorded his first five-wicket haul in ODI cricket with figures of 5/34 in a narrow victory over Ireland. He scored his maiden ODI century two matches later against Oman, finishing with 136 runs from 121 balls.

In May 2024, he was named in Scotland's squad for the 2024 ICC Men's T20 World Cup tournament.

In May 2025, during the 2025 Netherlands Tri-Nation Series, McMullen became the fastest Scottish man to reach 1,000 ODI runs.
