= Christopher McBride =

Scottish cricketer (born 1999)

Personal information
- Full name: Christopher John McBride
- Born: 26 June 1999 (age 27); Dumfries, Scotland
- Batting: Right-handed
- Bowling: Right-arm medium Right-arm leg break
- Role: Batsman

International information
- National side: Scotland
- ODI debut (cap 71): 15 April 2022 v Oman
- Last ODI: 12 April 2026 v Namibia
- T20I debut (cap 62): 15 June 2025 v Netherlands
- Last T20I: 18 April 2026 v Namibia

Domestic team information
- Years: Team
- 2026: Glasgow Cosmic

Career statistics
Competition	ODI	T20I	LA	T20
Matches	22	6	25	6
Runs scored	407	31	476	31
Batting average	22.61	10.33	22.66	10.33
100s/50s	0/1	0/0	0/1	0/0
Top score	56	17	56	17
Balls bowled	180	6	204	6
Wickets	3	0	4	0
Bowling average	45.00	–	39.75	–
5 wickets in innings	0	–	0	–
10 wickets in match	0	–	0	–
Best bowling	1/10	–	1/8	–
Catches/stumpings	6/–	1/–	6/–	1/–
- Source: Cricinfo, 18 April 2026

Christopher John McBride (born 26 June 1999) is a Scottish cricketer. He is a right-handed opening batsman and all-rounder who plays for the Scotland national cricket team.

== Personal life ==
McBride was born on 26 June 1999 in Dumfries. He attended school in Carlisle, England, and later completed an economics degree at Oxford Brookes University.

== Domestic career ==
While at school in England, McBride played representative junior cricket for Cumbria. He was accepted into Durham's academy and played in the Second XI Championship, also playing two matches for Oxford MCC Universities while attending university. In 2018 he spent a season in Australia playing in the Newcastle District Cricket Association in New South Wales.

== International career ==
In June 2019, he was selected to represent Scotland A in their tour to Ireland to play the Ireland Wolves. He made his List A debut for Scotland A against the Ireland Wolves on 6 June 2019. He made his Twenty20 debut for Scotland A against the Ireland Wolves on 9 June 2019.

In March 2022, he was named in Scotland's One Day International (ODI) squad for the 2022 Papua New Guinea Tri-Nation Series tournament. He made his ODI debut on 15 April 2022, for Scotland against Oman.
