= Sanchit Sharma =

Emirati cricketer (born 2001)

Personal information
- Full name: Sanchit Mohan Sharma
- Born: 22 July 2001 (age 25)
- Batting: Right handed
- Bowling: Right arm Medium
- Role: Bowler
- Relatives: Khushi Sharma (sister)

International information
- National side: United Arab Emirates (2021-present)
- ODI debut (cap 99): 27 March 2023 v Papua New Guinea
- Last ODI: 6 June 2023 v West Indies
- T20I debut (cap 57): 7 October 2021 v Ireland
- Last T20I: 16 February 2023 v Afghanistan
- Source: Cricinfo, 6 June 2023

Sanchit Mohan Sharma (born 22 July 2001) is a cricketer who plays for the United Arab Emirates national cricket team.

== Personal life ==
Sharma grew up in Ajman along with his sister Khushi Sharma, who made her debut for the UAE women's team in 2021. Their Indian father Brij Mohan Sharma moved to the UAE in 1990 to work as a mechanical engineer, later establishing a metal trading firm there. He played cricket at high levels in his home state of Haryana.

== Career ==
In October 2021, he was named in the UAE's Twenty20 International (T20I) squad for the 2021 Summer T20 Bash tournament. He made his T20I debut on 7 October 2021, against Ireland. Before his T20I debut, he was named in the UAE's squad for the 2020 Under-19 Cricket World Cup.

In March 2023, he was named in UAE's squad for the 2023 Cricket World Cup Qualifier Play-off. He made his One Day International (ODI) debut on 27 March 2023, for the UAE against Papua New Guinea in that tournament.
