= George Munsey =

Scottish cricketer

Personal information
- Full name: Henry George Munsey
- Born: 21 February 1993 (age 33); Oxford, England
- Batting: Left-handed
- Bowling: Right-arm medium-fast
- Role: Batsman

International information
- National side: Scotland
- ODI debut (cap 62): 22 January 2017 v Hong Kong
- Last ODI: 9 August 2026 v UAE
- ODI shirt no.: 93
- T20I debut (cap 39): 18 June 2015 v Ireland
- Last T20I: 18 April 2026 v Namibia
- T20I shirt no.: 93

Domestic team information
- Years: Team
- 2015: Northamptonshire
- 2019: Leicestershire
- 2020: Hampshire
- 2021: Kent
- 2025: Sylhet Strikers
- 2026: Nottinghamshire
- 2026: Glasgow Cosmic

Career statistics
Competition	ODI	T20I	FC	LA
Matches	79	88	4	108
Runs scored	2,777	2,598	224	3,552
Batting average	41.44	32.07	56.00	39.91
100s/50s	3/19	3/14	1/1	5/22
Top score	191	132	100*	191
Catches/stumpings	41/–	40/–	1/–	53/–
- Source: Cricinfo, 18 August 2026

Henry George Munsey (born 21 February 1993) is a Scottish cricketer. He has played for the Scotland national cricket team since 2015. He is a left-handed opening batsman. He also worked as a salesperson for Gray-Nicolls.

== Early life ==
Munsey was born in Oxford, England. He was educated at Loretto School in East Lothian between 2006 and 2011. He attended the school on a golf scholarship.

He moved from Oxford to Edinburgh at the age of 13 initially with the intention of pursuing his career as a pro golfer. He went on to become a scratch golfer by the age of 16, and he also went onto play golf alongside Tyrrell Hatton regularly in Oxfordshire. However, he changed his mind from becoming a pro golfer to a cricketer as he found tough challenges in pursuing his interest in golf.

== Domestic and franchise career ==
Munsey has played club cricket in Scotland for The Grange Club and Watsonians. He remained in Edinburgh after finishing his school and obtained a first central contract with Cricket Scotland in 2014.

On 21 April 2019, playing for the Gloucestershire 2nd XI against Bath in an unofficial Twenty20 match, Munsey scored 147 runs in 39 balls. His century was brought up in 25 balls, having scored his fifty in 17 balls, whilst he also scored six sixes in an over as Gloucestershire 2nd XI made 326/3 from their 20 overs. He was bought by Brampton Wolves for the 2019 Global T20 Canada.

On 24 August 2020, Munsey signed for Hampshire for the 2020 Vitality Blast. He played for Kent in the 2021 Royal London One-Day Cup.

He was selected to play for Sylhet Strikers in the 2025 Bangladesh Premier League.

In February 2026, Munsey agreed to a contract with Nottinghamshire to play for the club in that year's T20 Blast.

He was recently signed by Sudurpaschim Royals in SBL NPL S3.

== International career ==
He was selected to represent Scotland for their T20I tour of Ireland in June 2015 and the 2015 ICC World Twenty20 Qualifier in July 2015. He made his Twenty20 International (T20I) debut against Ireland on 18 June 2015. He made his first-class debut for Northamptonshire against the Australians on 15 August 2015. He made his One Day International (ODI) debut against Hong Kong on 22 January 2017.

In June 2019, he was selected to represent Scotland A in their tour to Ireland to play the Ireland Wolves. Later the same month, he was selected to play for the Brampton Wolves franchise team in the 2019 Global T20 Canada tournament. In July 2019, he was selected to play for the Glasgow Giants in the inaugural edition of the Euro T20 Slam cricket tournament. However, the following month the tournament was cancelled.

In September 2019, he was named in Scotland's squad for the 2019–20 Ireland Tri-Nation Series and the 2019 ICC T20 World Cup Qualifier tournament in the United Arab Emirates. Ahead of the T20 qualifier tournament, the International Cricket Council (ICC) named him as the player to watch in Scotland's squad. He was the leading run-scorer for Scotland in the tournament, with 234 runs in eight matches.

In the second match of the Ireland tri-series, against the Netherlands, Munsey scored 127 not out. It was his first century in T20Is, and the second-fastest century in T20I cricket, coming from 41 balls. In the same match, Munsey and Kyle Coetzer made an opening partnership of 200 runs, the highest partnership for any wicket for Scotland in T20Is, and the third-highest partnership overall. Scotland went on to score 252/3 from their twenty overs, their highest total in T20I cricket.

In September 2021, Munsey was named in Scotland's provisional squad for the 2021 ICC Men's T20 World Cup.

In May 2024, he was named in Scotland’s squad for the 2024 ICC Men's T20 World Cup tournament.

On 12 June 2025, Munsey set a new record for the highest individual score by a Scottish batter in an ODI, making 191 against the Netherlands at Forthill. During his innings he also passed 5,000 total international runs across all formats.
