= Chris Greaves (cricketer) =

Scottish cricketer

Personal information
- Full name: Christopher Nicholas Greaves
- Born: 12 October 1990 (age 36); Johannesburg, Gauteng, South Africa
- Batting: Right-handed
- Bowling: Right-arm leg break
- Role: Bowler

International information
- National side: Scotland (2021–present)
- ODI debut (cap 72): 29 May 2022 v USA
- Last ODI: 4 September 2025 v Namibia
- T20I debut (cap 52): 8 October 2021 v PNG
- Last T20I: 11 July 2025 v Jersey

Domestic team information
- Years: Team
- 2026: Dublin Guardians

Career statistics
Competition	ODI	T20I	LA	T20
Matches	30	35	32	37
Runs scored	381	290	386	296
Batting average	22.41	19.33	20.31	17.41
100s/50s	0/2	0/0	0/2	0/0
Top score	56*	45	56*	45
Balls bowled	659	480	695	486
Wickets	28	27	28	27
Bowling average	21.42	22.64	23.17	23.18
5 wickets in innings	1	0	1	0
10 wickets in match	0	0	0	0
Best bowling	5/53	3/26	5/53	3/26
Catches/stumpings	11/–	13/–	12/–	14/–
- Source: Cricinfo, 25 September 2026

Christopher Nicholas Greaves (born 12 October 1990) is a South African-born Scottish cricketer who plays for the Scotland national cricket team. He made his international debut in 2021 and plays as a right-arm leg spin bowler.

== Early life ==
Greaves was born on 12 October 1990 in South Africa. He moved to Scotland in 2011 to play cricket.

In 2013, Greaves moved to England to give trails to join the Durham County Cricket Club. For a brief period, he also worked as an Amazon delivery driver. He holds a British passport.

== Domestic career ==
Greaves grew up playing club cricket in Randburg, South Africa. After moving to Scotland he played for Glenrothes Cricket Club and Forfarshire Cricket Club. He also played for Gloucestershire in England's Second XI Championship in 2019.

== International career ==
Greaves was included in the extended Scottish national squad in 2018 and was named in the team for the 2019 Oman Quadrangular Series, although he did not play a game. In June 2019, he was selected to represent Scotland A in their tour to Ireland to play the Ireland Wolves. He made his List A debut for Scotland A against the Ireland Wolves on 6 June 2019. He made his Twenty20 debut for Scotland A against the Ireland Wolves on 9 June 2019.

In September 2021, Greaves was named in Scotland's Twenty20 International (T20I) squad for their series against Zimbabwe, and in Scotland's squads for the 2021 Summer T20 Bash and the 2021 ICC Men's T20 World Cup. He made his T20I debut on 8 October 2021, for Scotland against Papua New Guinea. In Scotland's opening match of the 2021 ICC Men's T20 World Cup, Greaves had a man of the match performance against Bangladesh.

In May 2022, Greaves was named in Scotland's One Day International (ODI) squad for the 2022 United States Tri-Nation Series. He made his ODI debut on 29 May 2022, for Scotland against the United States.

In May 2024, he was named in Scotland's squad for the 2024 ICC Men's T20 World Cup tournament.
