= Scotland national cricket team =

Men's cricket team

Scotland
- Nickname: The Scots/ Scottish Saltires
- Association: Cricket Scotland

Personnel
- Captain: Richie Berrington
- Coach: Owen Dawkins

International Cricket Council
- ICC status: Associate Member with ODI status (1994; 32 years ago)
- ICC region: Europe
ICC Rankings	Current	Best-ever
ODI	12th	11th (16 Feb 2024)
T20I	14th	11th (2 May 2017)

One Day Internationals
- First ODI: v. Australia at New Road, Worcester; 16 May 1999
- Last ODI: v. Canada at Forthill, Dundee; 13 August 2026
ODIs	Played	Won/Lost
Total	185	87/87 (1 tie, 10 no results)
This year	10	6/3 (0 ties, 1 no result)
- World Cup appearances: 3 (first in 1999)
- Best result: Group stage (1999, 2007, 2015)
- World Cup Qualifier appearances: 7 (first in 1997)
- Best result: Champions (2005, 2014)

T20 Internationals
- First T20I: v. Pakistan at Kingsmead Cricket Ground, Durban; 12 September 2007
- Last T20I: v. Namibia at Namibia Cricket Ground, Windhoek; 18 April 2026
T20Is	Played	Won/Lost
Total	116	52/59 (1 tie, 4 no results)
This year	7	3/4 (0 ties, 0 no results)
- T20 World Cup appearances: 7 (first in 2007)
- Best result: Super 12 (2021)
- T20 World Cup Qualifier appearances: 7 (Note: From 2023 edition onwards, T20 World Cup Qualifier refers to the Regional Final of the ICC Europe region.) (first in 2008)
- Best result: Champions (2015, 2023)
- Official website: www.cricketscotland.com
ODI kit
T20I kit
- As of 13 August 2026

The Scotland men's national cricket team (Note: Scottish Gaelic: Sgioba Criogaid Nàiseanta na h-Alba Scots: Scotland men's naitional cricket team) represents the country of Scotland in international cricket and is administered by Cricket Scotland. They compete in international competitions organised by the International Cricket Council (ICC), including the Cricket World Cup and the ICC Men's T20 World Cup. They play most of their home matches at The Grange, Edinburgh, as well as at other venues around Scotland.

Scotland's history in cricket dates back to the 18th century, and during the 19th and 20th centuries they frequently played touring teams and counties. In 1992, the Scottish Cricket Union severed links with the English Test and County Cricket Board and in 1994 they became Associate Members of the International Cricket Council (ICC). The Scottish Cricket Union changed its name to Cricket Scotland in 2001.

Scotland have played in three ODI World Cups (1999, 2007 and 2015) and five T20 World Cup tournaments (2007, 2009, 2016, 2021 and 2022). However, their first win in either of these events did not come until they beat Hong Kong in the 2016 T20 World Cup. Scotland have played in every ICC Intercontinental Cup tournament, winning the inaugural edition in 2004. In April 2018, the ICC decided to grant full Twenty20 International (T20I) status to all its members. Therefore, all Twenty20 matches played between Scotland and other ICC members after 1 January 2019 are a full T20I.

== History ==
=== Before ICC Membership ===
The first recorded cricket match in Scotland took place in Alloa in 1785. It would be another eighty years, however, before Scotland's national side played their first full match, against the English county Surrey in 1865, which they won by 172 runs. The first Scottish Cricket Union was formed in 1879, and the national team beat Australia by 7 wickets three years later. The cricket union became defunct in 1883, and Grange Cricket Club took over the administration of the game until 1909. The first match against Ireland took place in Dublin in 1888, with Ireland winning.

Scotland played their first match to be awarded first-class status against the touring Australians in 1905, with the Scottish side being captained to a draw by Hubert Johnston. They also played South Africa, West Indies, an all-Indian team, and New Zealand before the start of World War II. 1948 saw Australia visit Scotland for two games at the end of their tour of England. These games, both of which Australia won by an innings, were to be the last international games for Don Bradman. The Don signed off in typical style, making a fine unbeaten 123 in the second match. In 1954, Scotland hosted a three-match to the touring Pakistanis, which they lost by 10 wickets. Five years later, they held India to a draw.

The Pakistanis returned to Scotland in 1971, winning in Selkirk by 154 runs. The following year, Scotland gave the touring Australia side a scare in a low-scoring match, before succumbing to a six-wicket defeat. Scotland hosted New Zealand in 1978, losing by an innings and 157 runs.

=== English domestic cricket ===
As well as hosting touring sides, Scotland frequently played English first-class counties in the post-war period, and took part in the Benson & Hedges Cup for the first time in 1980. After enduring several winless seasons, their first Benson & Hedges victory came against Lancashire in 1986. Their second win came in 1990 when they beat Northamptonshire, a match in which a 20-year-old Dougie Brown took three wickets. When the tournament was reduced to the top eight County Championship teams for the 1999 season, they were unable to qualify and they did not rejoin the competition thereafter. From 1983 onwards, they took part in the NatWest Trophy. Their first win in the knockout competition came against Worcestershire in 1998. Gavin Haynes hit 74 and Man of the Match Craig Wright took 5/23 as Scotland sealed a famous four-run victory.

In the following season, they made it to the third round of an expanded version of the competition, beating Nottinghamshire Cricket Board and Dorset County Cricket Club before losing to Surrey in the Third Round. When the tournament was rebranded the Cheltenham & Gloucester Trophy, Scotland were unable to take part in the 2001 edition due to their appearance in the 2001 ICC Trophy. However they returned in 2002, enjoying wins over Middlesex Cricket Board and Dorset. In 2003, Scotland beat the Lancashire Cricket Board before losing out to Somerset. Similarly, the following year they enjoyed success against minor county Cumberland before losing to Essex.

In 2006 the tournament moved to a group stage, Scotland enjoyed a considerably better campaign, winning three games against first-class counties. Between 2007 and 2009, in what was now named the Friends Provident Trophy, Scotland won one game in each season. When the Friends Provident Trophy ended, Scotland joined the Clydesdale Bank 40, registering two victories in the 2010 edition. They won twice more in the 2011 season, when they adopted the name Scottish Saltires. However, in the following season they recorded just one victory, and their final season, in 2013, was winless. Then the Royal London Cup was launched in 2014, but no international teams were included. Since then, Cricket Scotland has expressed interest in playing in county cricket again, with the T20 Blast said to be their priority, but the Royal London Cup and The Hundred also of interest.

	Tournament Name	W	L	NR	Tournament Name	W	L	NR	Tournament Name	W	L	T	NR
1980	Gillette Cup	—N/a	—N/a	—N/a	B&H Cup	0	4	—N/a	John Player League	—N/a	—N/a	—N/a	—N/a
1981	Natwest Trophy	—N/a	—N/a	—N/a	B&H Cup	0	4	—N/a	John Player League	—N/a	—N/a	—N/a	—N/a
1982	Natwest Trophy	—N/a	—N/a	—N/a	B&H Cup	0	4	—N/a	John Player Special League	—N/a	—N/a	—N/a	—N/a
1983	Natwest Trophy	0	1	—N/a	B&H Cup	0	3	1	John Player Special League	—N/a	—N/a	—N/a	—N/a
1984	Natwest Trophy	0	1	—N/a	B&H Cup	0	4	—N/a	John Player Special League	—N/a	—N/a	—N/a	—N/a
1985	Natwest Trophy	0	1	—N/a	B&H Cup	0	4	—N/a	John Player Special League	—N/a	—N/a	—N/a	—N/a
1986	Natwest Trophy	0	1	—N/a	B&H Cup	1	3	—N/a	John Player Special League	—N/a	—N/a	—N/a	—N/a
1987	Natwest Trophy	0	1	—N/a	B&H Cup	0	4	—N/a	Refuge Assurance League	—N/a	—N/a	—N/a	—N/a
1988	Natwest Trophy	0	1	—N/a	B&H Cup	0	3	1	Refuge Assurance League	—N/a	—N/a	—N/a	—N/a
1989	Natwest Trophy	0	1	—N/a	B&H Cup	0	4	—N/a	Refuge Assurance League	—N/a	—N/a	—N/a	—N/a
1990	Natwest Trophy	0	1	—N/a	B&H Cup	1	3	—N/a	Refuge Assurance League	—N/a	—N/a	—N/a	—N/a
1991	Natwest Trophy	0	1	—N/a	B&H Cup	0	4	—N/a	Refuge Assurance League	—N/a	—N/a	—N/a	—N/a
1992	Natwest Trophy	0	1	—N/a	B&H Cup	0	3	1	Sunday League	—N/a	—N/a	—N/a	—N/a
1993	Natwest Trophy	0	1	—N/a	B&H Cup	0	1	—N/a	Axa Equity & Law League	—N/a	—N/a	—N/a	—N/a
1994	Natwest Trophy	0	1	—N/a	B&H Cup	0	1	—N/a	Axa Equity & Law League	—N/a	—N/a	—N/a	—N/a
1995	Natwest Trophy	0	1	—N/a	B&H Cup	0	4	—N/a	Axa Equity & Law League	—N/a	—N/a	—N/a	—N/a
1996	Natwest Trophy	0	1	—N/a	B&H Cup	0	4	—N/a	Axa Equity & Law League	—N/a	—N/a	—N/a	—N/a
1997	Natwest Trophy	0	1	—N/a	B&H Cup	0	3	1	Axa Life League	—N/a	—N/a	—N/a	—N/a
1998	Natwest Trophy	1	1	—N/a	B&H Cup	0	3	1	Axa League	—N/a	—N/a	—N/a	—N/a
1999	Natwest Trophy	2	1	—N/a	—N/a	—N/a	—N/a	—N/a	CGU National League	—N/a	—N/a	—N/a	—N/a
2000	Natwest Trophy	0	1	—N/a	—N/a	—N/a	—N/a	—N/a	Norwich Union National League	—N/a	—N/a	—N/a	—N/a
2001	C&G Trophy	—N/a	—N/a	—N/a	—N/a	—N/a	—N/a	—N/a	Norwich Union League	—N/a	—N/a	—N/a	—N/a
2002	C&G Trophy	2	1	—N/a	—N/a	—N/a	—N/a	—N/a	Norwich Union League	—N/a	—N/a	—N/a	—N/a
2003	C&G Trophy	1	1	—N/a	—N/a	—N/a	—N/a	—N/a	ECB National League	4	13	0	1
2004	C&G Trophy	1	1	—N/a	—N/a	—N/a	—N/a	—N/a	Totesport League	2	14	0	2
2005	C&G Trophy	0	1	—N/a	—N/a	—N/a	—N/a	—N/a	Totesport League	2	14	1	1
2006	C&G Trophy	3	6	—N/a	—N/a	—N/a	—N/a	—N/a	—N/a	—N/a	—N/a	—N/a	—N/a
2007	Friends Provident Trophy	1	7	1	—N/a	—N/a	—N/a	—N/a	—N/a	—N/a	—N/a	—N/a	—N/a
2008	Friends Provident Trophy	1	6	1	—N/a	—N/a	—N/a	—N/a	—N/a	—N/a	—N/a	—N/a	—N/a
2009	Friends Provident Trophy	1	7	—N/a	—N/a	—N/a	—N/a	—N/a	—N/a	—N/a	—N/a	—N/a	—N/a
2010	Clydesdale Bank 40	2	10	—N/a	—N/a	—N/a	—N/a	—N/a	—N/a	—N/a	—N/a	—N/a	—N/a
2011	Clydesdale Bank 40	2	9	1	—N/a	—N/a	—N/a	—N/a	—N/a	—N/a	—N/a	—N/a	—N/a
2012	Clydesdale Bank 40	1	8	3	—N/a	—N/a	—N/a	—N/a	—N/a	—N/a	—N/a	—N/a	—N/a
2013	Yorkshire Bank 40	0	11	1	—N/a	—N/a	—N/a	—N/a	—N/a	—N/a	—N/a	—N/a	—N/a

=== ICC Membership ===
In 1992, Scotland severed their ties with the Test and County Cricket Board (TCCB) and England, and gained Associate Membership of the ICC in their own right in 1994. They competed in the ICC Trophy for the first time in 1997, finishing third. They were denied a place in the final only by Bangladesh, who were granted full ICC Membership the following year and Test Status in 2001. In the third-place playoff, they beat Ireland by 51 runs, sealing their qualification for the 1999 World Cup,

Although England were official hosts of the World Cup, Scotland earned the right to host two of their matches in The Grange Club in Edinburgh.

Scotland's first ODI was played against eventual champions Australia. While they lost the game, they were competitive and a very strong Australia team reached the target after almost 45 overs.

16 May 1999
Scorecard

Scotland; 181/7 (50 overs)	v	Australia; 182/4 (44.5 overs)
Gavin Hamilton 34 (42); Shane Warne 3/39 (10 overs)		Mark Waugh 67 (114); Nick Dyer 2/43 (10 overs)

Australia won by 6 wickets
New Road, Worcester, England
Umpires: Steve Dunne (NZ) and Peter Willey (Eng)
Player of the match: Mark Waugh (Aus)

The rest of the tournament featured some chastening defeats, however, especially to the West Indies and New Zealand, who raced their way to low totals. In what some described as the team's "own Cup Final", the team lost narrowly to Bangladesh. Nonetheless, several players went home with their reputations enhanced, including Gavin Hamilton, who scored 217 runs at 54.25 and John Blain, who took 10 wickets at 21.00.

The 2001 ICC Trophy saw them finish 4th, losing a play-off game to Canada, but they won the 2005 tournament, beating long-time rivals Ireland in the final. In 2004, Scotland further staked their claim as one of the leading associate nations by winning the inaugural Intercontinental Cup. However, they did not progress beyond the first round in the 2005 tournament.

=== 2006 ===
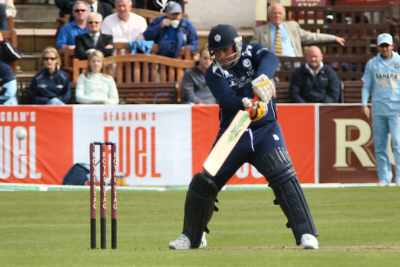
Scotland's Ryan Watson plays through backward point for a boundary against India at Glasgow's Titwood ground, 16 August 2007

March 2006 saw Scotland embark on a pre-season tour to Barbados. They performed with some credit, although they only won one of their 6 games, against a Barbados XI. They owed much of their success to Nik Morton, who re-qualified to represent Scotland internationally in 2004. They competed in the C & G Trophy in English domestic cricket in the early part of the 2006 English cricket season. They performed better than expected, winning three of their nine games, and finishing eighth in the Northern conference.

In June, they played their first ODI since the 1999 World Cup when they took on Pakistan in Edinburgh. Without key players Dougie Brown and Navdeep Poonia, they lost by five wickets. They finally got their first ODI win in the European Championships in August with a win over Holland in a rain-shortened game. They again missed key players for some games in this tournament though, and thanks to their loss against Ireland, finished second in the tournament.

During 2006 and early 2007, Scotland participated in the third edition of the Intercontinental Cup. They beat Namibia by an innings in May 2006, but draws against Ireland in August and the United Arab Emirates in January 2007 meant that they failed to reach the final. In December 2006, they travelled to Test nation Bangladesh for a two-match ODI series – their first outside the UK – but lost both matches heavily.

=== 2007 ===
In January 2007, after the Intercontinental Cup match against United Arab Emirates in Sharjah, they travelled to Kenya, first playing in a tri-series against Canada and Kenya in Mombasa, where they finished second. This was followed by Division One of the World Cricket League in Nairobi, where Scotland finished as runners up.

They then travelled to West Indies for their second World Cup. They again lost all their games and failed to progress beyond the first round. Back in the UK, they competed in the Friends Provident Trophy, their only win coming against Lancashire. They also drew an Intercontinental Cup match against United Arab Emirates. An ODI against Pakistan in July was washed out.

In July, Scotland took part in a quadrangular series in Ireland against the hosts, Holland and West Indies. However, the endeavour was not a success. They lost their matches against Ireland and West Indies, with the match against Holland being abandoned due to rain.

At the beginning of August, Scotland were on Intercontinental Cup duty as they beat Holland by an innings and 59 runs. They then drew with Ireland in a rain-affected match, only gaining 3 points after a poor 1st innings display. India were Scotland's next ODI opponents in mid-August, which was shown live on BBC Scotland from Titwood, Glasgow. The match was reduced slightly to 46 overs after a couple of brief showers, but India won by 7 wickets.

Having reached the final of the World Cricket League earlier in the year, Scotland qualified to play in the Twenty20 World Championship held in South Africa. They lost by 51 runs to Pakistan in their first game, and did not get a chance to play their other Group D opponents India, as the game was washed out without a ball being bowled.

=== 2008 ===
In July 2008, Scotland played a tri-series against New Zealand and Ireland in Aberdeen, Scotland. Scotland beat Ireland but lost their match against New Zealand.

In early August, Scotland participated with five other Associate nations in the 2009 ICC World Twenty20 Qualifier in Belfast. Despite an initial loss to hosts Ireland, victory against Bermuda secured a semi final slot. Throwing off the disappointment of an unexpected loss to Holland in the semi-final a few hours earlier, Scotland bounced right back for a 9 wicket victory over Kenya (who had advanced ahead of Canada), to secure third place. However, with only two nations guaranteed to progress, qualification for the 2009 ICC World Twenty20 was only granted when Zimbabwe confirmed that they would not attend the tournament.

On 18 August, Scotland played their first ODI encounter against England. Hosting the Auld Enemy, at the Grange Cricket Club in Edinburgh. However the match was abandoned due to rain after less than 3 overs of England's reply to Scotland's 156/9.

In December 2008, Cricket Scotland, the governing body of Scottish cricket, took the historic act of giving three Scotland players central contracts. Bowlers Gordon Goudie and Dewald Nel and captain Ryan Watson became the first full-time professional cricketers based in Scotland. Nineteen other cricketers have been offered part-time professional deals.

=== 2009 ===
Scotland participated in the 2009 ICC World Twenty20 in England in June 2009. They were drawn alongside Test nations New Zealand and South Africa in Group D, with both matches being played at The Oval in London.

The first match, against New Zealand, was shortened to 7 overs per side due to rain. Scotland batted first and made 89/4, with Kyle Coetzer top-scoring with 33. However, three no-balls and a dropped catch enabled New Zealand to win by seven wickets with an over to spare.

In the second match, South Africa made 211/5, with AB de Villiers hitting 79 not out off only 34 balls. In response, Scotland were bowled out for 81, more than half of which was scored by Coetzer (42). The 130-run margin of defeat was the second-largest in terms of runs in a Twenty20 International.

=== 2010 ===
In 2010, Scotland took part in the inaugural ECB 40 tournament.

Scotland competed in the qualifiers in the United Arab Emirates, to compete for a place in the 2010 ICC World Twenty20 in the West Indies. They competed for a place with Afghanistan, Canada, Ireland, Kenya, Holland, United Arab Emirates and USA. The tournament was disappointing for Scotland, going out in the group stage without winning a single match.

Scotland's Intercontinental Cup campaign was more successful as they reached the final in December – against Afghanistan – at the bespoke new cricket stadium in Dubai. Scheduled as a four-day first-class match of two innings each side, Afghanistan won the game in eight sessions. The match was live-streamed online by Cricket Scotland in agreement with the ICC.

=== ICC World Cup Qualifiers ===
During March and April 2009 Scotland attempted to defend the ICC Trophy they won in 2005. To secure qualification for the 2011 Cricket World Cup a top four place was targeted. They were also attempting to secure ODI status by finishing in the top six.

Scotland started the tournament badly by losing three of their five group games. With only the points earned against Namibia being taken through to the Super Eights, Scotland faced a difficult route to the World Cup.

Scotland started the Super Eights well by beating Holland in their first match. Defeats against Kenya and Afghanistan followed. The result of which threatened Scotland's qualification for the World Cup as well as the possibility of losing their ODI status if they finished out of the top six.

Victory against United Arab Emirates in their last game, and an improved run-rate, thanks to the 122 run victory, ensured a top six place for the Scots, securing ODI status until the next round of World Cup qualifiers.

In 2012, Scotland achieved their first victory against a full member of the ICC when it defeated a touring Bangladesh side.

24 July 2012
16:00
Scorecard

Scotland; 162/7 (20 overs)	v	Bangladesh; 128 (18 overs)
Richie Berrington 100 (58); Mashrafe Mortaza 2/22 (4 overs)		Shakib Al Hasan 31 (29); Josh Davey 3/23 (4 overs)

Scotland won by 34 runs
Sportpark Westvliet, The Hague
Umpires: Ian Ramage (Sco) and Richard Smith (Ire)

The Scottish team qualified for the ICC Cricket World Cup 2015 in Australia and New Zealand, but was eliminated after six straight losses out of six matches.

In January 2017 Scotland took part in the 2017 Desert T20 Challenge. They won all three of their group fixtures, before losing to Ireland in the semi-finals.

=== Zimbabwe tour of Scotland in 2017 ===
Scotland achieved their second victory against a full member of the ICC when it defeated a touring Zimbabwe side.

15 June 2017
Scorecard

Scotland; 317/6 (50 overs)	v	Zimbabwe; 272 (41.4 overs)
Kyle Coetzer 109 (101); Sean Williams 2/48 (10 overs)		Malcolm Waller 92 (62); Con de Lange 5/60 (8 overs)

Scotland won by 26 runs (D/L method)
The Grange Club, Edinburgh
Umpires: Ruchira Palliyaguruge (SL) and Ian Ramage (Sco)

- Scotland won the toss and elected to bat.
- Rain during Zimbabwe's innings set them a revised target of 299 runs in 43 overs.
- Con de Lange (Sco) took his first five-wicket haul in an ODI.
- This was the first ODI match between the two sides and Scotland's first ever win in an ODI against a Test playing nation.

=== 2018 ===
Scotland achieved their third victory against a full member of the ICC when it defeated a touring England side.

10 June 2018
11:00
Scorecard

Scotland; 371/5 (50 overs)	v	England; 365 (48.5 overs)
Calum MacLeod 140* (94); Adil Rashid 2/72 (10 overs)		Jonny Bairstow 105 (59); Mark Watt 3/55 (10)

Scotland won by 6 runs
The Grange Club, Edinburgh
Umpires: Marais Erasmus (SA) and Allan Haggo (Sco)
Player of the match: Calum MacLeod (Sco)

- England won the toss and elected to field.
- Dylan Budge (Sco) made his ODI debut.
- Calum MacLeod scored the fastest century by a batsman for Scotland in ODIs and became the first batsman for Scotland to score a century in ODIs against England.
- Scotland made their highest score in ODIs and the highest score by an Associate team against a Full Member team.
- Jonny Bairstow became the first batsman for England to score centuries in three consecutive ODIs.

=== 2022 ===
Scotland achieved their fourth victory against a full member of the ICC when it defeated the West Indies in the first round of the 2022 ICC T20 World Cup.

17 October 2022
15:00
Scorecard

Scotland; 160/5 (20 overs)	v	West Indies; 118 (18.3 overs)
George Munsey 66* (53); Jason Holder 2/14 (3 overs)		Jason Holder 38 (33); Mark Watt 3/12 (4 overs)

Scotland won by 42 runs
Bellerive Oval, Hobart
Attendance: 2,135
Umpires: Aleem Dar (Pak) and Paul Wilson (Aus)
Player of the match: George Munsey (Sco)

- West Indies won the toss and elected to field.

== International grounds ==
Locations of all stadiums which have hosted an international cricket match within Scotland

Scotland currently has five grounds which have hosted internationals.

The Grange Club in Edinburgh was founded in 1832, and the club's current ground has been in operation since 1872. The ground seats 5,000 people and has hosted 22 ODIs and 27 T20Is, including two matches at the 1999 Cricket World Cup.

Titwood in Glasgow is the home ground of Clydesdale Cricket Club, which was founded in 1848 and moved here in 1876. Titwood hosted its first first-class match against Marylebone Cricket Club in July 1963. Between 1984 and 1986 the ground hosted an annual fixture against Ireland. It has hosted six ODIs, the most recent being in 2022.

Cambusdoon New Ground in Ayr was approved by the International Cricket Council (ICC) to host ODI matches in 2006. The ground hosted Scotland's 2015–17 ICC Intercontinental Cup matches between United Arab Emirates and Namibia.

Mannofield Park in Aberdeen was also approved for ODI matches in 2006. The ground's history dates back to 1879 when Aberdeen University played host to Edinburgh University. The ground also welcomed Ireland in 1930 and was the ground where Sir Donald Bradman scored his last century on British soil in 1948. It has hosted 22 ODIs, 2 T20Is and 11 first-class matches, the last of which came in July 2013 when Scotland beat Kenya in the 2011–2013 ICC Intercontinental Cup.

Forthill in Dundee is the home of Forfarshire Cricket Club and was opened in 1880 with a match between Forfarshire and Glenalmond College. In the 20th century several first-class matches took place there, including games against touring Indians and New Zealanders. It was first used for ODIs in 2024, playing host to Namibia and Oman in the ICC Men's Cricket World Cup League 2.

== Notable Scottish cricketers ==
Many famous cricketers have hailed from Scotland, most notably former England captain, Mike Denness, who was born in Lanarkshire and represented Scotland both before and during his time at Kent.

Douglas Jardine, a particularly infamous cricketer, and a man who was vilified in Australia, was born in British India to Scottish parents. He developed leg theory, which led to the notorious "Bodyline" Ashes series in 1932-33. Despite living most of his life in England, Jardine gave his children Scottish names and asked for his ashes to be scattered in Scotland.

Arguably one of Scotland's best spinners - and also a respected journalist - was Ian Peebles, who was one of the Wisden Cricketers of the Year in 1931, alongside Don Bradman.

Another Scottish spinner was Peter Such, who took 849 first-class wickets and made 11 test appearances for England. In a 1999 test against New Zealand, Such broke the world-record for the longest duck, surviving 51 balls and allowing England to add 31 for the ninth wicket in a scrappy draw.

Brian Hardie was a major contributor to the Essex side of the 1970s and 1980s, which won four County Championships, three Sunday Leagues, a Benson & Hedges Cup and a NatWest Trophy, in which he was Man of the Match after scoring 110 in a one-run victory.. The regular opening partner of Graham Gooch, Hardie retired with more than 18,000 first class runs.

Stirling-born all-rounder Dougie Brown enjoyed a fifteen-year career with Warwickshire and represented both England and Scotland.

The same was the case for all-rounder Gavin Hamilton, who played for both Yorkshire and Durham in domestic cricket, and starred in the 1999 World Cup for Scotland, before playing a test for England in the same year.

== Tournament history ==
Legend

- Champions
- Runners-up
- Third place/Semi-finals
- Hosts
- Q Qualified/Advanced to next stage
- DNQ Did not qualify
- ▲ Promoted
- Remained in the same division
- ▼ Relegated

=== Cricket World Cup ===
Cricket World Cup record								Qualification record				
Year	Round	Position	Pld	W	L	T	NR	Pld	W	L	T	NR
(England) 1975	Not an ICC member							Not an ICC member				
(England) 1979	Not an ICC member							Not an ICC member				
(England) (Wales) 1983	Not an ICC member							Not an ICC member				
(India) (Pakistan) 1987	Not an ICC member							Not an ICC member				
(Australia) (New Zealand) 1992	Not an ICC member							Not an ICC member				
(India) (Pakistan) (Sri Lanka) 1996	Not an ICC member at the time of qualification							Not an ICC member				
(England) (Wales) (Scotland) (Republic of Ireland) (Netherlands) 1999	Group stage	12/12	5	0	5	0	0	9	6	2	0	1
(South Africa) (Zimbabwe) (Kenya) 2003	Did not qualify							10	7	3	0	0
(Cricket West Indies) 2007	Pool stage	15/16	3	0	3	0	0	7	7	0	0	0
(India) (Sri Lanka) (Bangladesh) 2011	Did not qualify							16	9	7	0	0
(Australia) (New Zealand) 2015	Pool stage	14/14	6	0	6	0	0	28	18	9	0	1
(England) (Wales) 2019	Did not qualify							21	12	5	1	3
(India) 2023	Did not qualify							43	29	12	0	2
(South Africa) (Zimbabwe) (Namibia) 2027	To be determined							36*	19	10	0	7
Total	0 Titles	3/13	14	0	14	0	0	170	107	48	1	14

=== Cricket World Cup Qualifier ===
Cricket World Cup Qualifier record
Year	Round	Position	Pld	W	L	T	NR	Qual.
(Sri Lanka) 1979	Not an ICC member							
(England) 1982	Not an ICC member							
(England) 1986	Not an ICC member							
(Netherlands) 1990	Not an ICC member							
(Kenya) 1994	Not an ICC member							
(Malaysia) 1997	Third place	3/22	9	6	2	0	1	Q
(Canada) 2001	Fourth place	4/24	10	7	3	0	0	DNQ
(Ireland) 2005	Champions	1/12	7	7	0	0	0	Q
(South Africa) 2009	Super Eights	6/12	10	5	5	0	0	DNQ
(New Zealand) 2014	Champions	1/10	8	7	1	0	0	Q
(Zimbabwe) 2018	Fourth place	4/10	7	4	2	1	0	DNQ
(Zimbabwe) 2023	Third place	3/10	7	5	2	0	0	DNQ
(Namibia) (South Africa) 2027	Qualified							
Total	2 Titles	8/13	58	41	15	1	1	—N/a

=== CWC League 2 ===
Cricket World Cup League 2 record
Year	Round	Position	Pld	W	L	T	NR	P/R
2019–2023	Champions	1/7	36	24	10	0	2	Same position
2024–2026	Runners-up	2/8	36	19	10	0	7	Same position
Total	1 Title	2/2	72	43	20	0	9	—N/a

=== Men's T20 World Cup ===
Men's T20 World Cup record								Qualification record				
Year	Round	Position	Pld	W	L	T	NR	Pld	W	L	T	NR
(South Africa) 2007	Group stage	10/12	2	0	1	0	1	6	4	2	0	0
(England) 2009	Group stage	12/12	2	0	2	0	0	4	2	2	0	0
(Cricket West Indies) 2010	Did not qualify							3	0	3	0	0
(Sri Lanka) 2012	Did not qualify							9	5	4	0	0
(Bangladesh) 2014	Did not qualify							10	6	4	0	0
(India) 2016	First round	14/16	3	1	2	0	1	8	5	2	0	1
(United Arab Emirates) (Oman) 2021	Super 12	9/16	8	3	5	0	0	8	5	3	0	0
(Australia) 2022	First round	14/16	3	1	2	0	1	Qualified automatically				
(United States) (Cricket West Indies) 2024	Group Stage	9/20	4	2	1	0	1	6	6	0	0	0
(India) (Sri Lanka) 2026 (Note: Although Scotland were eliminated in the qualifier; they qualified for the tournament based on ICC Rankings to replace Bangladesh after the latter's withdrawal.)	Group Stage	12/20	4	1	3	0	0	4	1	2	0	1
(Australia) (New Zealand) 2028	To be determined							To be determined				
(England) (Ireland) (Scotland) 2030	Qualified as co-hosts							Qualified automatically				
Total	0 Titles	7/10	26	8	16	0	4	58	34	22	0	2

=== T20 World Cup Global Qualifier ===
Men's T20 World Cup Global Qualifier record
Year	Round	Position	Pld	W	L	T	NR	Qual.
(Ireland) 2008	Third place	3/6	4	2	2	0	0	Q
(United Arab Emirates) 2010	Group stage	7/8	6	3	3	0	0	DNQ
(United Arab Emirates) 2012	Play-offs	5/16	9	5	4	0	0	DNQ
(United Arab Emirates) 2013	Play-offs	7/16	10	6	4	0	0	DNQ
(Ireland) (Scotland) 2015	Joint winners	=1/14	8	5	2	0	1	Q
(United Arab Emirates) 2019	Play-offs	5/14	8	5	3	0	0	Q
(Oman) / (Zimbabwe) 2022	Did not participate; qualified directly							
(To be determined) 2028	To be determined							
Total	1 Title	6/7	45	26	18	0	1	—N/a

=== T20 World Cup Europe Regional Final ===
T20 World Cup Europe Regional Final (Note: For the 2024 and 2026 Men's T20 World Cups, the final round of qualification in Asia was the ICC Asia Regional Final.) record
Year	Round	Position	Pld	W	L	T	NR	Qual.
(Guernsey) 2019	Received a bye to the Global Qualifier							
(Spain) 2021	Qualified directly to the T20 World Cup							
(Scotland) 2023	Winners	1/7	6	6	0	0	0	Q
(Netherlands) 2025	Fourth place	4/5	4	1	2	0	1	Q
(To be determined) 2027	Qualified							
Total	1 Title	3/5	10	7	2	0	1	—N/a

=== Commonwealth Games ===
Commonwealth Games record
Year	Round	Position	Pld	W	L	T	NR
(Malaysia) 1998	Group stage	13/16	3	0	2	0	1
Total	0 Titles	1/1	3	0	2	0	1

=== Other international tournaments ===
World Cricket League (LA/OD/ODI)	ICC Intercontinental Cup (FC)	ICC 6 Nations Challenge (List A)
2007 (Division One) : Runners-up; 2010 (Division One) : Runners-up; 2011–13 (Championship): 5th place; 2015–17 (Championship): Runners-up	2004: Winners; 2005: First round; 2006–07: First round; 2007–08: 4th place; 2009–10: Runners-up; 2011–13: 3rd place; 2015–17: 6th place	2000: 6th place; 2004: Runners-up

=== Other regional tournaments ===
Friends Provident Trophy (List A)	European Championship (OD/ODI)‡
2007 (North Conference): 10th place; 2006 (North Conference): 8th place; 2005: Round 1; 2004: Round 2; 2003: Round 3; 2002: Round 3	1996: 5th place; 1998: 3rd place; 2000 (Division One): 3rd place; 2002 (Division One): Runners-up; 2004 (Division One): 4th place; 2006 (Division One): Runners-up; 2008 (Division One): Runners-up

‡ Only the matches between Scotland, Ireland and Netherlands in the 2006 tournament have official ODI status.

== Current squad ==
This lists all the active players who are contracted to or have played for Scotland in the past year (since 20 December 2024 to 18 February 2026) and the forms in which they have played, and any players (in italics) outside this criterion who have been selected in the team's most recent ODI or T20I squad.

Key

- S/N = Shirt number

Name	Age	Batting style	Bowling style	Forms	S/N	Last ODI	Last T20I
Batters
Richie Berrington	39	Right-handed	Right-arm medium-fast	ODI (C), T20I (C)	44	(Namibia) 2025	(Nepal) 2026
Tom Bruce	35	Right-handed	Right-arm off break	ODI	42	(Namibia) 2025	(Nepal) 2026
Oli Hairs	35	Left-handed	Right-arm off break	T20I	14	(Afghanistan) 2010	(Jersey) 2025
Michael Jones	28	Right-handed	Right-arm off break	ODI, T20I	49	(Nepal) 2024	(Nepal) 2026
Christopher McBride	27	Right-handed	Right-arm medium	ODI, T20I	—	(United Arab Emirates) 2025	(Nepal) 2025
Finlay McCreath	28	Right-handed	Right-arm medium-fast	ODI, T20I	23	(Canada) 2025	(Nepal) 2025
George Munsey	33	Left-handed	Right-arm medium-fast	ODI, T20I	93	(Namibia) 2025	(Nepal) 2026
Liam Naylor	25	Right-handed	Right-arm medium	ODI, T20I	—	(Netherlands) 2025	(Nepal) 2025
All-rounders
Michael Leask	36	Right-handed	Right-arm off break	ODI, T20I	29	(Namibia) 2025	(Nepal) 2026
Brandon McMullen	27	Right-handed	Right-arm medium	ODI, T20I	21	(Namibia) 2025	(Nepal) 2026
Wicket-keepers
Matthew Cross	34	Right-handed	—	ODI, T20I	9	(Netherlands) 2025	(Nepal) 2026
Charlie Tear	22	Right-handed	—	ODI, T20I	28	(Namibia) 2025	(Jersey) 2025
Pace bowlers
Charlie Cassell	28	Right-handed	Right-arm fast-medium	ODI, T20I	19	(Netherlands) 2025	(Netherlands) 2025
Brad Currie	28	Right-handed	Left-arm fast-medium	ODI, T20I	4	(Namibia) 2025	(Nepal) 2026
Josh Davey	36	Right-handed	Right-arm medium-fast	ODI	38	(Namibia) 2025	(Zimbabwe) 2022
Brad Wheal	30	Right-handed	Right-arm fast-medium	ODI, T20I	—	(Nepal) 2024	(Nepal) 2026
Jasper Davidson	24	Right-handed	Right-arm fast	ODI, T20I	—	(Netherlands) 2025	(Netherlands) 2025
Jack Jarvis	23	Right-handed	Right-arm medium-fast	ODI, T20I	66	(Netherlands) 2025	(Nepal) 2025
Mackenzie Jones	20	Right-handed	Right-arm fast	ODI, T20I	—	(Netherlands) 2025	(Netherlands) 2025
Safyaan Sharif	35	Right-handed	Right-arm medium-fast	ODI, T20I	50	(Namibia) 2025	(Cricket West Indies) 2026
Spin bowlers
Chris Greaves	36	Right-handed	Right-arm leg-break	ODI, T20I	13	(Namibia) 2025	(Jersey) 2025
Mark Watt	30	Left-handed	Slow left-arm orthodox	ODI, T20I	51	(Namibia) 2025	(Nepal) 2026
Oliver Davidson	22	Left-handed	Slow left-arm orthodox	T20I	6	(United Arab Emirates) 2022	(Nepal) 2026

== Coaching staff ==
Position	Name
Head coach	Owen Dawkins
Batting coach	Ryan Watson
Bowling coach	Craig Wright
Fielding coach	Gordon Drummond
Physiotherapist	Gregor Maiden
Strength and conditioning coach	Calum MacLeod
Analyst	Kyle Coetzer

== Records and statistics ==
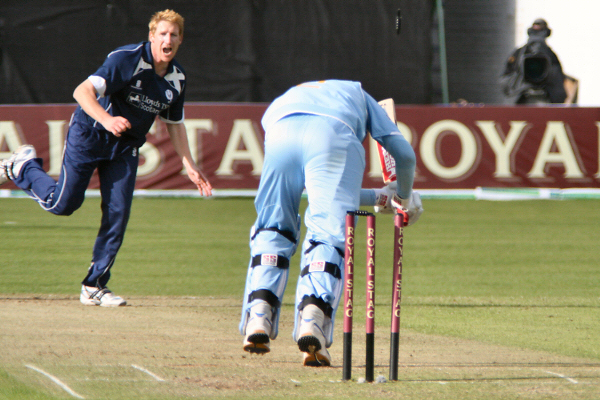
Scotland's John Blain bowls India's Yuvraj Singh at Glasgow's Titwood ground, 16 August 2007

International match summary – Scotland

**Playing record**
Format	M	W	L	T	NR	Inaugural match
One-Day Internationals	185	87	87	1	10	16 May 1999
Twenty20 Internationals	116	52	59	1	4	12 September 2007

Last updated 13 August 2026.

=== One-Day Internationals ===
- Highest team total: 380/9 v. Netherlands, 16 May 2025 at Sportpark Maarschalkerweerd, Utrecht
- Highest individual score: 175, Calum MacLeod v. Canada, 27 January 2014 at Hagley Oval, Christchurch
- Best individual bowling figures: 6/28, Josh Davey v. Afghanistan, 14 January 2015 at Sheikh Zayed Cricket Stadium, Abu Dhabi

**Most ODI runs for Scotland**

Player	Runs	Average	Career span
**Richie Berrington**	3,881	33.17	2008–2026
Kyle Coetzer	3,192	38.92	2008–2023
Calum MacLeod	3,026	38.30	2008–2022
**George Munsey**	2,777	41.44	2017–2026
**Matthew Cross**	2,490	24.65	2014–2026

**Most ODI wickets for Scotland**

Player	Wickets	Average	Career span
**Safyaan Sharif**	122	30.13	2016–2026
**Mark Watt**	121	28.00	2016–2026
**Michael Leask**	74	32.95	2014–2026
**Brandon McMullen**	68	21.86	2022–2026
Majid Haq	60	32.91	2006–2015

- Players still playing for Scotland are listed in **bold**.

**Highest individual innings in ODI**

Player	Score	Opposition	Venue	Year
George Munsey	**191**	Netherlands	Dundee	2025
Calum MacLeod	**175**	Canada	Christchurch	2014
Calum MacLeod	**157***	Afghanistan	Bulawayo	2018
Kyle Coetzer	**156**	Bangladesh	Nelson	2015
Calum MacLeod	**154**	Papua New Guinea	Port Moresby	2017

**Best bowling figures in an innings in ODI**

Player	Score	Opposition	Venue	Year
Charlie Cassell	**7/21**	Oman	Dundee	2024
Josh Davey	**6/34**	Afghanistan	Abu Dhabi	2015
Lyle Robertson	**6/52**	Canada	Dundee	2026
Josh Davey	**5/9**	Afghanistan	Ayr	2010
John Blain	**5/22**	Netherlands	Dublin	2008

ODI record versus other nations

Opponent	M	W	L	T	NR	First match	First win
**v. Test nations**
Afghanistan	13	4	8	0	1	19 April 2009	9 July 2010
Australia	5	0	5	0	0	16 May 1999	
Bangladesh	4	0	4	0	0	24 May 1999	
England	5	1	3	0	1	18 August 2008	10 June 2018
India	1	0	1	0	0	16 August 2007	
Ireland	21	5	15	0	1	5 August 2006	30 January 2007
New Zealand	4	0	4	0	0	31 May 1999	
Pakistan	3	0	3	0	0	20 May 1999	
South Africa	1	0	1	0	0	20 March 2007	
Sri Lanka	4	0	4	0	0	13 July 2011	
West Indies	4	1	3	0	0	27 May 1999	1 July 2023
Zimbabwe	4	2	1	1	0	15 June 2017	15 June 2017
**v. Associate Members**
Bermuda	1	0	1	0	0	5 February 2007	
Canada	14	10	4	0	0	18 January 2007	18 January 2007
Hong Kong	5	2	2	0	1	26 January 2016	10 September 2016
Kenya	9	5	3	0	1	17 January 2007	2 February 2007
Namibia	11	9	1	0	1	10 July 2022	10 July 2022
Nepal	12	5	6	0	1	13 July 2022	17 July 2022
Netherlands	16	9	6	0	1	6 August 2006	6 August 2006
Oman	10	6	2	0	2	15 August 2019	18 August 2019
Papua New Guinea	10	9	1	0	0	6 October 2017	6 October 2017
United Arab Emirates	18	13	5	0	0	1 February 2014	1 February 2014
United States	10	6	4	0	0	9 December 2019	14 December 2019

Records complete to ODI #5005. Last updated 13 August 2026.

=== Twenty20 Internationals ===
- Highest team total: 252/3 v. Netherlands, 16 September 2019 at Malahide Cricket Club Ground, Malahide
- Highest individual score: 132, George Munsey v. Austria, 25 July 2023 at Goldenacre Sports Ground, Edinburgh
- Best individual bowling figures: 5/13, Brad Currie v. Ireland, 28 July 2023 at The Grange Club, Edinburgh

**Most T20I runs for Scotland**

Player	Runs	Average	Career span
George Munsey	2,598	32.07	2015–2026
Richie Berrington	2,504	30.91	2008–2026
Kyle Coetzer	1,495	22.65	2008–2021
Matthew Cross	1,439	23.20	2013–2026
Calum MacLeod	1,238	23.80	2009–2022

**Most T20I wickets for Scotland**

Player	Wickets	Average	Career span
Mark Watt	94	21.98	2015–2026
Safyaan Sharif	87	24.41	2012–2026
Michael Leask	59	21.27	2013–2026
Alasdair Evans	41	23.26	2015–2022
Josh Davey	37	23.97	2012–2022

T20I record versus other nations

Opponent	M	W	L	T	NR	First match	First win
**v. Test nations**
Afghanistan	7	0	7	0	0	10 February 2010	
Australia	4	0	4	0	0	15 June 2024	
Bangladesh	2	2	0	0	0	24 July 2012	24 July 2012
England	2	0	1	0	1	4 June 2024	
India	2	0	1	0	1	13 September 2007	
Ireland	16	4	9	1	2	2 August 2008	18 June 2015
New Zealand	4	0	4	0	0	6 June 2009	
Pakistan	4	0	4	0	0	12 September 2007	
South Africa	1	0	1	0	0	7 June 2009	
West Indies	2	1	1	0	0	17 October 2022	17 October 2022
Zimbabwe	5	1	4	0	0	10 March 2016	15 September 2021
**v. Associate Members**
Austria	1	1	0	0	0	25 July 2023	25 July 2023
Bermuda	2	2	0	0	0	3 August 2008	3 August 2008
Canada	1	1	0	0	0	23 March 2012	23 March 2012
Denmark	1	1	0	0	0	27 July 2023	27 July 2023
Germany	1	1	0	0	0	20 July 2023	20 July 2023
Hong Kong	5	4	1	0	0	25 July 2015	25 July 2015
Italy	3	2	1	0	0	24 July 2023	24 July 2023
Jersey	2	1	1	0	0	21 July 2023	21 July 2023
Kenya	8	5	3	0	0	4 August 2008	4 August 2008
Namibia	7	3	4	0	0	22 October 2019	6 June 2024
Nepal	3	1	2	0	0	17 June 2025	20 June 2025
Netherlands	18	9	9	0	0	4 August 2008	22 November 2013
Oman	5	5	0	0	0	19 January 2017	19 January 2017
Papua New Guinea	3	3	0	0	0	21 October 2019	21 October 2019
Singapore	1	0	1	0	0	18 October 2019	
United Arab Emirates	6	4	2	0	0	9 July 2015	9 July 2015

Records complete to T20I #3819. Last updated 18 April 2026.

== See also ==
- Cricket in Scotland
- List of Scotland ODI cricketers
- List of Scotland T20I cricketers
- List of Scotland national cricket captains
- Sport in Scotland
- Scotland women's national cricket team

== Bibliography ==
- Perry, Jake (2020). The Secret Game: Tales of Scottish Cricket. Shrewsbury: Chequered Flag Publishing. ISBN 9781999777463.
- —————; Heatly, Gary (2022). Playing with Teeth: How Scotland's Cricketers Broke the Cycle of Glorious Failure. Chichester, West Sussex: Pitch Publishing. ISBN 9781801501217.
