= Afghan cricket team in Scotland in 2019 =

International cricket tour

	Scotland	Afghanistan
- Dates: 8 – 10 May 2019
Captains	Kyle Coetzer	Gulbadin Naib

One Day International series
- Results: Afghanistan won the 2-match series 1–0
Most runs	Calum MacLeod (100)	Rahmat Shah (113)
Most wickets	Alasdair Evans (1); Tom Sole (1); Brad Wheal (1)	Gulbadin Naib (3)

The Afghanistan cricket team toured Scotland in May 2019 to play two One Day International (ODI) matches. In April 2019, the Afghanistan Cricket Board (ACB) named Gulbadin Naib as the team's new ODI captain, replacing Asghar Afghan.

Afghanistan last visited Scotland in July 2016, winning a rain-affected two-match series 1–0. The two teams last played each other in an ODI in March 2018, during the 2018 Cricket World Cup Qualifier in Zimbabwe, with Scotland winning by seven wickets. The ODI fixtures were part of Afghanistan's preparation for the 2019 Cricket World Cup. As per the previous series in 2016, this series was also impacted by the weather, with Afghanistan winning 1–0, after the first match was washed out.

== Squads ==
ODIs
Scotland	Afghanistan
Kyle Coetzer (c); Richie Berrington; Matthew Cross (wk); Alasdair Evans; Michael Jones; Michael Leask; Calum MacLeod; Gavin Main; George Munsey; Safyaan Sharif; Tom Sole; Craig Wallace (wk); Mark Watt; Brad Wheal	Gulbadin Naib (c); Asghar Afghan; Aftab Alam; Sharafuddin Ashraf; Hamid Hassan; Mujeeb Ur Rahman; Rahmat Shah; Hashmatullah Shahidi; Mohammad Shahzad (wk); Samiullah Shinwari; Dawlat Zadran; Najibullah Zadran; Noor Ali Zadran; Hazratullah Zazai

Prior to the second ODI, Mujeeb Ur Rahman was added to Afghanistan's squad.

== ODI series ==
=== 1st ODI ===
8 May 2019
11:00
Scorecard

Scotland	v	Afghanistan

Match abandoned
The Grange Club, Edinburgh
Umpires: Kumar Dharmasena (SL) and Allan Haggo (Sco)

- No toss.
- No play was possible due to rain.

=== 2nd ODI ===
10 May 2019
11:00
Scorecard

Scotland; 325/7 (50 overs)	v	Afghanistan; 269/3 (44.5 overs)
Calum MacLeod 100 (89); Gulbadin Naib 3/72 (10 overs)		Rahmat Shah 113 (115); Alasdair Evans 1/45 (7.5 overs)

Afghanistan won by 2 runs (DLS method)
The Grange Club, Edinburgh
Umpires: Kumar Dharmasena (SL) and Alex Dowdalls (Sco)
Player of the match: Rahmat Shah (Afg)

- Scotland won the toss and elected to bat.
- Rain during Afghanistan's innings prevented any further play.
- Asghar Afghan (Afg) played in his 100th ODI.
- Gulbadin Naib captained Afghanistan for the first time in ODIs.
- Kyle Coetzer became the first batsman for Scotland to score 2,000 runs in ODIs.
