= 2017–18 United Arab Emirates Tri-Nation Series =

International cricket tournament

- Date: 11–23 January 2018
- Location: United Arab Emirates
- Result: Ireland won the series
Teams
Ireland	Scotland	United Arab Emirates
Captains
William Porterfield	Kyle Coetzer (Note: Richie Berrington replaced Kyle Coetzer as captain for Scotland's first two matches.)	Rohan Mustafa
Most runs
Andrew Balbirnie (216)	Michael Jones (180)	Rameez Shahzad (258)
Most wickets
Kevin O'Brien (8) Barry McCarthy (8)	Safyaan Sharif (6)	Mohammad Naveed (8)

The 2017–18 United Arab Emirates Tri-Nation Series was a cricket tournament that took place in January 2018 in the United Arab Emirates. The tri-nation series featured Ireland, Scotland and the United Arab Emirates, with all the matches played as One Day Internationals (ODIs). The matches were in preparation for the 2018 Cricket World Cup Qualifier, which was held in Zimbabwe in March 2018. Ireland won the series after winning all four of their matches, finishing with a 24-run victory against Scotland. Scotland and the United Arab Emirates won one match each, both finishing with two points, with Scotland finishing in second place on net run rate.

== Squads ==
Ireland	Scotland	United Arab Emirates
William Porterfield (c); Andrew Balbirnie; Peter Chase; George Dockrell; Ed Joyce; Andrew McBrine; Barry McCarthy; Jacob Mulder; Kevin O'Brien; Niall O'Brien; Stuart Poynter; Boyd Rankin; Simi Singh; Paul Stirling; Gary Wilson	Kyle Coetzer (c); Richie Berrington; Scott Cameron; Matthew Cross; Alasdair Evans; Michael Jones; Michael Leask; Calum MacLeod; George Munsey; Safyaan Sharif; Tom Sole; Craig Wallace; Mark Watt; Stuart Whittingham	Rohan Mustafa (c); Ashfaq Ahmed; Qadeer Ahmed; Shaiman Anwar; Mohammad Boota; Imran Haider; Amir Hayat; Zahoor Khan; Adnan Mufti; Mohammad Naveed; Ahmed Raza; Ghulam Shabber; Rameez Shahzad; Muhammad Usman

Richie Berrington replaced Kyle Coetzer as Scotland's captain for their first two matches, as Coetzer was completing a coaching qualification.

== Results ==
=== Standings ===
Pos	Team	Pld	W	L	T	NR	BP	Pts	NRR
1	Ireland	4	4	0	0	0	0	8	0.960
2	Scotland	4	1	3	0	0	0	2	−0.456
3	United Arab Emirates	4	1	3	0	0	0	2	−0.503

Source: Cricinfo

=== Matches ===
11 January 2018
09:30
Scorecard

United Arab Emirates; 222/9 (50 overs)	v	Ireland; 226/6 (49.2 overs)
Rameez Shahzad 75 (111); Boyd Rankin 2/26 (10 overs)		Ed Joyce 116* (149); Mohammad Naveed 2/45 (9 overs)

Ireland won by 4 wickets
ICC Academy 1, Dubai
Umpires: Roland Black (Ire) and Nitin Menon (Ind)
Player of the match: Ed Joyce (Ire)

- Ireland won the toss and elected to field.
- Ashfaq Ahmed and Mohammad Boota (UAE) both made their ODI debuts.
- Ed Joyce (Ire) scored his 10,000th run in List A cricket.
- Points: Ireland 2, United Arab Emirates 0.

13 January 2018
09:30
Scorecard

Ireland; 301/5 (50 overs)	v	United Arab Emirates; 234 (48.4 overs)
William Porterfield 139 (147); Rohan Mustafa 2/65 (10 overs)		Rameez Shahzad 50 (56); Kevin O'Brien 4/41 (10 overs)

Ireland won by 67 runs
ICC Academy 1, Dubai
Umpires: Alex Dowdalls (Sco) and Nitin Menon (Ind)
Player of the match: William Porterfield (Ire)

- Ireland won the toss and elected to bat.
- Andrew Balbirnie (Ire) scored his first century in ODIs.
- Points: Ireland 2, United Arab Emirates 0.

16 January 2018
09:30
Scorecard

Scotland; 219 (49.2 overs)	v	Ireland; 223/4 (34.5 overs)
Michael Jones 87 (135); Boyd Rankin 3/49 (10 overs)		Andrew Balbirnie 67 (55); Safyaan Sharif 2/44 (6 overs); Tom Sole 2/44 (6 overs)

Ireland won by 6 wickets
ICC Academy 1, Dubai
Umpires: Alex Dowdalls (Sco) and Nitin Menon (Ind)
Player of the match: Andrew Balbirnie (Ire)

- Ireland won the toss and elected to field.
- Michael Jones and Tom Sole (Sco) both made their ODI debuts.
- Points: Ireland 2, Scotland 0.

18 January 2018
09:30
Scorecard

Ireland; 331/6 (50 overs)	v	Scotland; 307/9 (50 overs)
Paul Stirling 74 (88); Stuart Whittingham 3/58 (10 overs)		Michael Jones 74 (94); George Dockrell 2/43 (8 overs)

Ireland won by 24 runs
ICC Academy 1, Dubai
Umpires: Roland Black (Ire) and Nitin Menon (Ind)
Player of the match: Paul Stirling (Ire)

- Ireland won the toss and elected to bat.
- Scott Cameron (Sco) made his ODI debut.
- This was Ireland's joint-highest total in ODIs.
- Points: Ireland 2, Scotland 0.

21 January 2018
09:30
Scorecard

Scotland; 249/8 (50 overs)	v	United Arab Emirates; 218 (46.3 overs)
Matthew Cross 107* (110); Shaiman Anwar 3/61 (10 overs)		Ghulam Shabber 90 (83); Mark Watt 2/33 (9 overs)

Scotland won by 31 runs
ICC Academy 1, Dubai
Umpires: Alex Dowdalls (Sco) and Nitin Menon (Ind)
Player of the match: Matthew Cross (Sco)

- United Arab Emirates won the toss and elected to field.
- Matthew Cross (Sco) scored his first century in ODIs.
- Points: Scotland 2, United Arab Emirates 0.

23 January 2018
09:30
Scorecard

Scotland; 299/9 (50 overs)	v	United Arab Emirates; 300/6 (49.1 overs)
Kyle Coetzer 75 (79); Mohammad Naveed 3/47 (10 overs)		Rameez Shahzad 121* (115); Safyaan Sharif 2/50 (10 overs)

United Arab Emirates won by 4 wickets
ICC Academy 1, Dubai
Umpires: Akbar Ali (UAE) and Nitin Menon (Ind)
Player of the match: Rameez Shahzad (UAE)

- Scotland won the toss and elected to bat.
- Amir Hayat (UAE) made his ODI debut.
- Rameez Shahzad (UAE) scored his first century in ODIs.
- This was the United Arab Emirates's highest successful run chase in ODIs.
- Points: United Arab Emirates 2, Scotland 0.
