= English cricket team in Scotland in 2018 =

International cricket match

	Scotland	England
- Date: 10 June 2018
Captains	Kyle Coetzer	Eoin Morgan

One Day International series
- Results: Scotland won the 1-match series 1–0
Most runs	Calum MacLeod (140)	Jonny Bairstow (105)
Most wickets	Mark Watt (3)	Adil Rashid (2); Liam Plunkett (2)

The England cricket team toured Scotland to play a One Day International (ODI) at The Grange Club, Edinburgh, on 10 June 2018. The match was followed by two Twenty20 Internationals (T20Is) against Pakistan on the same ground on 12 and 13 June. The last time the two teams played in an ODI against each other was in the 2015 Cricket World Cup, with England winning by 119 runs. In May 2018, Cricket Scotland named a provisional 24-man squad for the matches against England and Pakistan.

Scotland won the one-off fixture by six runs, their first ever win against England in ODIs. Man of the match, Calum MacLeod, who scored an unbeaten 140 runs, said it was "a massive statement from Scottish cricket", with England's captain, Eoin Morgan, saying "it is huge for Scotland". In December 2018, the win against England won the Scottish team the Inspirational Performance award at the Scottish Sports Awards.

== Squads ==
Scotland	England
Kyle Coetzer (c); Richie Berrington (vc); Dylan Budge; Matthew Cross (wk); Alasdair Evans; Michael Jones; Michael Leask; Calum MacLeod; Preston Mommsen; George Munsey; Safyaan Sharif; Chris Sole; Mark Watt; Brad Wheal; Stuart Whittingham	Eoin Morgan (c); Moeen Ali; Jonny Bairstow; Sam Billings (wk); Tom Curran; Alex Hales; Dawid Malan; Liam Plunkett; Adil Rashid; Joe Root; Jason Roy; ~~Ben Stokes~~; David Willey; ~~Chris Woakes~~; Mark Wood

Ben Stokes and Chris Woakes were both ruled out of England's squad due to injury and were replaced by Dawid Malan and Tom Curran respectively.

== Only ODI ==
10 June 2018
11:00
Scorecard

Scotland; 371/5 (50 overs)	v	England; 365 (48.5 overs)
Calum MacLeod 140* (94); Adil Rashid 2/72 (10 overs)		Jonny Bairstow 105 (59); Mark Watt 3/55 (10)

Scotland won by 6 runs
The Grange Club, Edinburgh
Umpires: Marais Erasmus (SA) and Allan Haggo (Sco)
Player of the match: Calum MacLeod (Sco)

- England won the toss and elected to field.
- Dylan Budge (Sco) made his ODI debut.
- Calum MacLeod scored the fastest century by a batsman for Scotland in ODIs and became the first batsman for Scotland to score a century in ODIs against England.
- Scotland made their highest score in ODIs and the highest score by an Associate team against a Full Member team.
- Jonny Bairstow became the first batsman for England to score centuries in three consecutive ODIs.
