= Pakistani cricket team in Scotland in 2018 =

International cricket tour

	Scotland	Pakistan
- Dates: 12 – 13 June 2018
Captains	Kyle Coetzer	Sarfaraz Ahmed

Twenty20 International series
- Results: Pakistan won the 2-match series 2–0
Most runs	Michael Leask (47)	Sarfaraz Ahmed (103)
Most wickets	Michael Leask (3); Alasdair Evans (3)	Faheem Ashraf (3); Shadab Khan (3)

The Pakistan cricket team toured Scotland to play two Twenty20 International (T20I) matches at The Grange Club, Edinburgh, on 12 and 13 June 2018. Pakistan last toured Scotland in May 2013 to play two One Day Internationals. Both teams last met in a T20I fixture in the group stage of the 2007 ICC World Twenty20 tournament. This was the first time that Scotland had played a home T20I match against an ICC full member side.

The tour followed Pakistan's tour of England and their one Test series in Ireland. England also played a single ODI against Scotland on 10 June at the same ground. In May 2018, Cricket Scotland named a provisional 24-man squad for the matches against England and Pakistan. Pakistan took the two-match series 2–0, winning the first match by 48 runs and the second by 84 runs.

== Squads ==
Scotland	Pakistan
Kyle Coetzer (c); Richie Berrington (vc); Dylan Budge; Matthew Cross; Alasdair Evans; Michael Leask; Calum MacLeod; George Munsey; Safyaan Sharif; Chris Sole; Hamza Tahir; Craig Wallace (wk); Mark Watt; Brad Wheal; Stuart Whittingham	Sarfaraz Ahmed (c, wk); Shaheen Afridi; Asif Ali; Hasan Ali; Rahat Ali; Mohammad Amir; Faheem Ashraf; Shadab Khan; Usman Khan; Shoaib Malik; Mohammad Nawaz; Ahmed Shehzad; Haris Sohail; Hussain Talat; Fakhar Zaman

== T20I Series ==
=== 1st T20I ===
12 June 2018
16:00 (D/N)
Scorecard

Pakistan; 204/4 (20 overs)	v	Scotland; 156/6 (20 overs)
Sarfaraz Ahmed 89* (49); Alasdair Evans 3/23 (4 overs)		Michael Leask 38* (24); Shadab Khan 2/25 (4 overs)

Pakistan won by 48 runs
The Grange Club, Edinburgh
Umpires: Alex Dowdalls (Sco) and Allan Haggo (Sco)
Player of the match: Sarfaraz Ahmed (Pak)

- Pakistan won the toss and elected to bat.
- Dylan Budge and Hamza Tahir (Sco) both made their T20I debuts.

=== 2nd T20I ===
13 June 2018
16:00 (D/N)
Scorecard

Pakistan; 166/6 (20 overs)	v	Scotland; 82 (14.4 overs)
Shoaib Malik 49* (22); Michael Leask 3/31 (4 overs)		Calum MacLeod 25 (27); Faheem Ashraf 3/5 (2.4 overs)

Pakistan won by 84 runs
The Grange Club, Edinburgh
Umpires: Alex Dowdalls (Sco) and Ian Ramage (Sco)
Player of the match: Usman Khan (Pak)

- Pakistan won the toss and elected to bat.
