= 2018 Cricket World Cup Qualifier =

Cricket tournament

2018 ICC Cricket World Cup Qualifier
- Dates: 4 – 25 March 2018
- Administrator: International Cricket Council
- Cricket format: One Day International; List A cricket
- Tournament format(s): Round-robin and Knockout
- Host: Zimbabwe
- Champions: Afghanistan (1st title)
- Runners-up: West Indies
- Participants: 10
- Matches: 34
- Player of the series: (Zimbabwe) Sikander Raza
- Most runs: (Zimbabwe) Brendan Taylor (457)
- Most wickets: (Afghanistan) Mujeeb Ur Rahman (16)

The 2018 ICC Cricket World Cup Qualifier was a cricket tournament that took place during March 2018 in Zimbabwe. It formed the final part of the Cricket World Cup qualification process for the 2019 World Cup in England and Wales. The top two teams, Afghanistan and the West Indies, qualified for the World Cup, joining the hosts and the seven teams who had already qualified through their ranking in the ICC ODI Championship. Afghanistan won the tournament, beating the West Indies by 7 wickets in the final. Afghanistan’s Mohommad Shahzad was named the player of the match and Zimbabwe’s Sikandar Raza was named the player of the tournament.

The tournament was initially scheduled to take place in Bangladesh, but in May 2017 it was reported that the event would instead be hosted elsewhere as Bangladesh were close to automatic qualification, and thus would not need to participate in this tournament. Three bids were under consideration: one from Zimbabwe, one from Nepal and a joint-bid from Ireland and Scotland, who were the winners of the previous qualifier tournament.

In October 2017, the International Cricket Council (ICC) announced that Zimbabwe would host the event. In January 2018, the ICC confirmed all the fixtures and venues for the tournament. At the end of the tournament, the Netherlands (who won the ICC World Cricket League Championship) and the top three Associate Member teams earned One Day International (ODI) status until 2023.

== Summary ==
Hosts Zimbabwe failed to reach the final and missed out on playing in the Cricket World Cup for the first time since 1983. As a result of their poor performance, Zimbabwe Cricket sacked all their coaching staff and their team captain, Graeme Cremer. Recently appointed Full Member side Ireland also missed the Cricket World Cup for the first time since 2007, and for the first time, no Associate Member qualified for the Cricket World Cup.

Following the conclusion of the group stage, Afghanistan, Ireland, Scotland, United Arab Emirates, West Indies and Zimbabwe had all progressed to the Super Sixes, with a chance to qualify for the 2019 Cricket World Cup. Hong Kong, Nepal, Netherlands and Papua New Guinea did not qualify for the Super Sixes, but advanced to the playoffs to determine their final rankings in positions seven to ten. Both Scotland and the United Arab Emirates kept their ODI status until 2022, by virtue of reaching the Super Sixes.

Hong Kong, Nepal and Papua New Guinea competed for the final ODI status spot in the playoffs. In the first round of playoff matches, Nepal beat Papua New Guinea by 6 wickets and the Netherlands beat Hong Kong by 44 runs. Therefore, with the Netherlands already guaranteed ODI status at the end of the tournament, Nepal gained ODI status for the first time. With their defeats in the first playoff matches, Hong Kong and Papua New Guinea both lost their ODI status and were relegated to Division Two of the World Cricket League. The fixture between Hong Kong and Papua New Guinea, for the ninth place playoff, was the 4,000th ODI match to be played.

The West Indies became the first side to qualify for the 2019 Cricket World Cup, after they beat Scotland by five runs by the Duckworth–Lewis–Stern method in the Super Sixes. Tournament hosts Zimbabwe lost their final match in the Super Sixes to the United Arab Emirates, meaning they would need Afghanistan and Ireland's match to end as tie to allow them to progress to the Cricket World Cup. However, Afghanistan beat Ireland by five wickets in the final Super Six match, therefore joining the West Indies in the tournament final and also qualifying for the Cricket World Cup.

In the final, Afghanistan's Rashid Khan became the fastest and youngest bowler to take 100 wickets in ODIs when he dismissed Shai Hope. He took 44 matches to take his 100th dismissal, breaking the previous record of 52 matches, set by Mitchell Starc of Australia.

== Teams ==
It was decided before the 2015 Cricket World Cup that the number of participating teams at the 2019 Cricket World Cup would be reduced to ten. A new World Cup qualification structure was introduced where the host nation of the World Cup and the top seven other teams in the ICC ODI Championship on 30 September 2017 would qualify directly for the World Cup, with the remaining two spots being decided by the World Cup qualifying tournament. Following recent success, Afghanistan and Ireland were promoted into the ICC ODI Championship in 2015, taking the number of teams in the ICC ODI Championship to twelve. Afghanistan and Ireland were granted Test status in 2017, making them the 11th and 12th Test-playing nations, meaning that at least two Test-playing nations would miss the World Cup for the first time.

The bottom four teams in the ICC ODI Championship ranking would be joined by the top four teams from the 2015–17 ICC World Cricket League Championship and the two finalists of the 2018 ICC World Cricket League Division Two for the qualifying tournament. Therefore, at most two associate teams could qualify for the World Cup, or none if beaten by the Test playing nations.

Means of qualification	Date	Venue	Berths	Qualified
ICC ODI Championship (Bottom 4)	30 September 2017	Various	4	West Indies; Afghanistan; Zimbabwe; Ireland
2015–17 ICC World Cricket League Championship	8 December 2017	Various	4	Netherlands; Scotland; Hong Kong; Papua New Guinea
2018 ICC World Cricket League Division Two	15 February 2018	Namibia	2	Nepal; United Arab Emirates
Total			10	

=== ICC ODI Championship ===
The bottom four teams (9th to 12th places) in the ICC ODI Championship, as at 30 September 2017, did not receive automatic World Cup qualification and are required to play in the 2018 World Cup Qualifier. Qualification by this route was finalised after the West Indies lost the first match of their ODI series against England in September 2017, meaning they were unable to catch any of the teams above them in the rankings by the cut-off date. Afghanistan, Ireland and Zimbabwe, below the West Indies in the rankings, were confirmed as having to play in the qualification tournament before this date.

=== WCL Championship ===
The top four teams from the 2015–17 ICC World Cricket League Championship qualified for the 2018 World Cup Qualifier. After the conclusion of the sixth round of fixtures in the championship, both the Netherlands and Papua New Guinea had qualified. Following the first fixtures in round seven, they were joined by Scotland and Hong Kong. The Netherlands ended up winning the tournament, with Scotland finishing second followed by Hong Kong in third and Papua New Guinea fourth.

=== WCL Division Two ===
The top two teams from the 2018 ICC World Cricket League Division Two qualified for the 2018 World Cup Qualifier. Nepal and the United Arab Emirates placed first and second in the round-robin stage, thus claiming the final places in the Qualifier. The United Arab Emirates won the final of the Division Two tournament to go into Group A, with Nepal placed in Group B.

== Tournament format ==
Initially, the teams were split into two groups of five; these groups played on a round-robin basis. Two points were awarded for a win, one point for a no result and no points for a loss. The top three teams in each group went forward to a Super Six round. The results between the progressing teams were carried forward, including the corresponding points and net run rate, while the results against the teams that finished in the bottom two places in each group were discarded. Each team then played the qualifiers from the other group. The remaining four teams (that finish in the bottom two places in each group) played-off for positions 7–10. The bottom two Associate Member teams, excluding the Netherlands, were relegated to the ICC World Cricket League Division Two.

The top two teams at the end of the Super Six stage earned qualification to the 2019 World Cup, and also contested the final to determine the winner of the tournament. If the final ended as a tie, then a Super Over would have been played to decide the winner. In the event of a no result, the tournament's winner would have been the side that finished highest in the Super Sixes.

== Squads ==
The following squads were named ahead of the tournament:

Afghanistan	Hong Kong	Ireland	Nepal	Netherlands
Asghar Stanikzai (c); Rashid Khan (vc); Javed Ahmadi; Sharafuddin Ashraf; Nasir Jamal; Ihsanullah Janat; Mohammad Nabi; Gulbadin Naib; Rahmat Shah; Mohammad Shahzad (wk); Samiullah Shinwari; Dawlat Zadran; Mujeeb Ur Rahman; Najibullah Zadran; Shapoor Zadran; Afsar Zazai	Babar Hayat (c); ~~Ahsan Abbasi~~; Tanwir Afzal; Nadeem Ahmed; Tanveer Ahmed; Waqas Barkat; Christopher Carter; Aizaz Khan; Ehsan Khan; Nizakat Khan; Scott McKechnie; Ehsan Nawaz; Anshuman Rath; Kinchit Shah; Simandeep Singh; Shahid Wasif	William Porterfield (c); Andrew Balbirnie; Peter Chase; George Dockrell; Ed Joyce; Andrew McBrine; Barry McCarthy; Tim Murtagh; Kevin O'Brien; Niall O'Brien; Boyd Rankin; James Shannon; Simi Singh; Paul Stirling; Gary Wilson	Paras Khadka (c); Dipendra Airee; Lalit Bhandari; Shakti Gauchan; Sompal Kami; Karan KC; Sandeep Lamichhane; Gyanendra Malla; Dilip Nath; Rohit Paudel; Lalit Rajbanshi; Basanta Regmi; Anil Sah; Aarif Sheikh; Sharad Vesawkar	Peter Borren (c); Wesley Barresi; Ben Cooper; Ryan ten Doeschate; Bas de Leede; Paul van Meekeren; ~~Stephan Myburgh~~; Max O'Dowd; Scott Edwards; Roelof van der Merwe; Shane Snater; Pieter Seelaar; Timm van der Gugten; Vivian Kingma; Fred Klaassen; Sikander Zulfiqar
Papua New Guinea	Scotland	United Arab Emirates	West Indies	Zimbabwe
Assad Vala (c); Charles Amini; Sese Bau; Mahuru Dai; Kiplin Doriga; Jason Kila; Vani Morea; Alei Nao; Damien Ravu; John Reva; Lega Siaka; Chad Soper; Tony Ura; Norman Vanua; Jack Vare	Kyle Coetzer (c); Richie Berrington (vc); Matthew Cross; Alasdair Evans; Michael Jones; Michael Leask; Calum MacLeod; George Munsey; Safyaan Sharif; Chris Sole; Tom Sole; Craig Wallace; Mark Watt; Brad Wheal; Stuart Whittingham	Rohan Mustafa (c); Ashfaq Ahmed; Qadeer Ahmed; Shaiman Anwar; Mohammad Boota; Imran Haider; Amir Hayat; Zahoor Khan; Adnan Mufti; Mohammad Naveed; Ahmed Raza; Ghulam Shabber; Rameez Shahzad; Chirag Suri; Muhammad Usman	Jason Holder (c); Jason Mohammed (vc); Devendra Bishoo; Carlos Brathwaite; Sheldon Cottrell; Chris Gayle; Shimron Hetmyer; Shai Hope; Evin Lewis; Nikita Miller; Ashley Nurse; Keemo Paul; Rovman Powell; Kemar Roach; Marlon Samuels; Kesrick Williams	Graeme Cremer (c); ~~Ryan Burl~~; Tendai Chatara; Tendai Chisoro; Craig Ervine; Kyle Jarvis; Hamilton Masakadza; Solomon Mire; Peter Moor; ~~Tarisai Musakanda~~; Blessing Muzarabani; Richard Ngarava; Sikandar Raza; Brendan Taylor; Brian Vitori; Malcolm Waller; Sean Williams; Cephas Zhuwao

Prior to the tournament, Stephan Myburgh was ruled out of the Netherlands squad due to injury and was replaced by Bas de Leede. Zimbabwe initially named Ryan Burl and Tarisai Musakanda in their squad, but they were replaced by Sean Williams and Cephas Zhuwao.

Afghanistan's captain Asghar Stanikzai missed the start of the tournament, after having his appendix removed. Rashid Khan captained Afghanistan in Stanikzai's absence. Stanikzai was eventually ruled out of the start of the tournament and was replaced by Afsar Zazai. Stanikzai returned to the squad, after he was declared fit to play, ahead of Afghanistan's final two Super Six matches. Stanikzai's replacement, Afsar Zazai, was ruled out of the last two matches due to injury. Following Afghanistan's match with Zimbabwe, Mohammad Shahzad was suspended for the final two group matches after being found guilty of damaging part of the ground.

Zimbabwe's Brian Vitori was suspended from bowling, following the match with Nepal. He was replaced by Richard Ngarava. Sheldon Cottrell was replaced in the West Indies squad by Keemo Paul, after Cottrell injured himself during the match against the United Arab Emirates. Ahead of Hong Kong's group match with Scotland, Ahsan Abbasi suffered an injury and was ruled out of the tournament. He was replaced by Kinchit Shah.

== Warm-up matches ==
Ten non-ODI warm-up matches were played on 27 February and 1 March.

== Group stage ==
The ICC confirmed the fixtures for the tournament in January 2018. All the matches were recorded as ODIs, except those that involved the Netherlands and Nepal, as they did not have ODI status at the start of the tournament. On 8 March 2018, the venues for the final two games in Group B were switched, due to the anticipated attendance for Zimbabwe's last group match. On 13 March 2018, the ICC confirmed all the umpires for the Super Sixes and playoff matches.

=== Group A ===
==== Points table ====
Pos	Team	Pld	W	L	T	NR	Pts	NRR	Qualification
1	West Indies	4	4	0	0	0	8	1.171	Advanced to Super Sixes
2	Ireland	4	3	1	0	0	6	1.479	Advanced to Super Sixes
3	United Arab Emirates	4	2	2	0	0	4	−1.177	Advanced to Super Sixes
4	Netherlands	4	1	3	0	0	2	−0.709	Advanced to 7th–10th Play-offs
5	Papua New Guinea	4	0	4	0	0	0	−0.865	Advanced to 7th–10th Play-offs

Source: ESPNcricinfo

==== Fixtures ====
4 March 2018
09:30
Scorecard

United Arab Emirates; 221 (49.4 overs)	v	Papua New Guinea; 113 (25.5 overs)
Rohan Mustafa 95 (136); Norman Vanua 4/39 (9.4 overs)		Charles Amini 24 (31); Mohammad Naveed 5/28 (5.5 overs)

United Arab Emirates won by 56 runs (DLS)
Harare Sports Club, Harare
Umpires: Simon Fry (Aus) and Shaun George (SA)
Player of the match: Mohammad Naveed (UAE)

- Papua New Guinea won the toss and elected to field.
- Papua New Guinea were set a revised target of 170 runs from 28 overs due to rain.
- Jason Kila (PNG) made his ODI debut.
- Mohammad Naveed (UAE) took his first five-wicket haul in ODIs.

4 March 2018
09:30
Scorecard

Ireland; 268/7 (50 overs)	v	Netherlands; 149 (32.2 overs)
Andrew Balbirnie 68 (75); Timm van der Gugten 3/59 (10 overs)		Timm van der Gugten 33 (25); Tim Murtagh 3/28 (7 overs)

Ireland won by 93 runs (DLS)
Old Hararians, Harare
Umpires: Michael Gough (Eng) and Ahsan Raza (Pak)
Player of the match: Andrew Balbirnie (Ire)

- Netherlands won the toss and elected to field.
- Netherlands were set a revised target of 243 runs from 41 overs due to rain.
- This was the first international cricket match to be played at this venue.

6 March 2018
09:30
Scorecard

Papua New Guinea; 235 (50 overs)	v	Ireland; 237/6 (49.1 overs)
Tony Ura 151 (142); Andy McBrine 3/38 (10 overs)		William Porterfield 111 (133); Assad Vala 2/39 (10 overs)

Ireland won by 4 wickets
Harare Sports Club, Harare
Umpires: Simon Fry (Aus) and Langton Rusere (Zim)
Player of the match: Tony Ura (PNG)

- Ireland won the toss and elected to field.
- Tony Ura scored the highest total by a batsman for Papua New Guinea in an ODI. He also scored the fourth-highest percentage of runs in a completed innings in an ODI (64.25%).

6 March 2018
09:30
Scorecard

West Indies; 357/4 (50 overs)	v	United Arab Emirates; 297/6 (50 overs)
Shimron Hetmyer 127 (93); Imran Haider 1/62 (10 overs)		Rameez Shahzad 112* (107); Jason Holder 5/53 (10 overs)

West Indies won by 60 runs
Old Hararians, Harare
Umpires: Michael Gough (Eng) and Sharfuddoula (Ban)
Player of the match: Shimron Hetmyer (WI)

- West Indies won the toss and elected to bat.
- Chirag Suri (UAE) made his ODI debut.
- This was the first ODI match to be played at this venue.
- Chris Gayle (WI) became the third batsman to score a century against eleven different countries in ODIs.
- Shimron Hetmyer (WI) scored his first century in ODIs.
- Kemar Roach (WI) took his 100th wicket in ODIs.

8 March 2018
09:30
Scorecard

Netherlands; 176 (46.3 overs)	v	United Arab Emirates; 177/4 (44 overs)
Wesley Barresi 37 (55); Rohan Mustafa 5/26 (9.3 overs)		Chirag Suri 78* (126); Paul van Meekeren 1/18 (8 overs)

United Arab Emirates won by 6 wickets
Harare Sports Club, Harare
Umpires: Ahsan Raza (Pak) and Langton Rusere (Zim)
Player of the match: Rohan Mustafa (UAE)

- Netherlands won the toss and elected to bat.

8 March 2018
09:30
Scorecard

Papua New Guinea; 200 (42.4 overs)	v	West Indies; 201/4 (43 overs)
Assad Vala 57 (89); Carlos Brathwaite 5/27 (10 overs)		Jason Holder 99* (101); Alei Nao 1/16 (6 overs)

West Indies won by 6 wickets
Old Hararians, Harare
Umpires: Shaun George (SA) and Sharfuddoula (Ban)
Player of the match: Jason Holder (WI)

- Papua New Guinea won the toss and elected to bat.
- Carlos Brathwaite (WI) took his first five-wicket haul in ODIs.
- Papua New Guinea could no longer qualify for the Super Sixes as a result of this match and advanced to the playoff semi-finals.

10 March 2018
09:30
Scorecard

West Indies; 257/8 (50 overs)	v	Ireland; 205 (46.2 overs)
Rovman Powell 101 (100); Tim Murtagh 4/41 (10 overs)		Ed Joyce 63 (86); Kemar Roach 4/27 (10 overs)

West Indies won by 52 runs
Harare Sports Club, Harare
Umpires: Simon Fry (Aus) and Michael Gough (Eng)
Player of the match: Rovman Powell (WI)

- Ireland won the toss and elected to field.
- Rovman Powell (WI) scored his first century in ODIs.
- West Indies qualified for the Super Sixes as a result of this match.

10 March 2018
09:30
Scorecard

Netherlands; 216/8 (50 overs)	v	Papua New Guinea; 159 (42.1 overs)
Sikander Zulfiqar 53* (65); Alei Nao 2/28 (6.3 overs)		Assad Vala 44 (58); Roelof van der Merwe 4/46 (10 overs)

Netherlands won by 57 runs
Old Hararians, Harare
Umpires: Ahsan Raza (Pak) and Sharfuddoula (Ban)
Player of the match: Roelof van der Merwe (Ned)

- Papua New Guinea won the toss and elected to field.

12 March 2018
09:30
Scorecard

West Indies; 309/6 (48 overs)	v	Netherlands; 167/6 (28.4 overs)
Evin Lewis 84 (92); Paul van Meekeren 2/37 (9 overs)		Ryan ten Doeschate 67* (62); Ashley Nurse 1/25 (6 overs)

West Indies by 54 runs (DLS)
Harare Sports Club, Harare
Umpires: Shaun George (SA) and Michael Gough (Eng)
Player of the match: Evin Lewis (WI)

- Netherlands won the toss and elected to field.
- Netherlands were set a revised target of 222 runs from 28.4 overs due to rain.
- United Arab Emirates qualified for the Super Sixes as a result of this match, with the Netherlands advancing to the playoff semi-finals.

12 March 2018
09:30
Scorecard

Ireland; 313/6 (44 overs)	v	United Arab Emirates; 91 (29.3 overs)
Paul Stirling 126 (117); Mohammad Naveed 3/84 (9 overs)		Ghulam Shabber 19 (40); Boyd Rankin 4/15 (6 overs)

Ireland won by 226 runs (DLS)
Old Hararians, Harare
Umpires: Simon Fry (Aus) and Langton Rusere (Zim)
Player of the match: Paul Stirling (Ire)

- United Arab Emirates won the toss and elected to field.
- United Arab Emirates were set a revised target of 318 runs from 44 overs due to rain.
- The 205-run stand for the first wicket between Paul Stirling and William Porterfield was Ireland's highest partnership for the first wicket in ODIs.
- Kevin O'Brien (Ire) scored his 3,000th run in ODIs.
- Ireland qualified for the Super Sixes as a result of this match.

=== Group B ===
==== Points table ====
Pos	Team	Pld	W	L	T	NR	Pts	NRR	Qualification
1	Zimbabwe	4	3	0	1	0	7	1.035	Advanced to Super Sixes
2	Scotland	4	3	0	1	0	7	0.855	Advanced to Super Sixes
3	Afghanistan	4	1	3	0	0	2	0.038	Advanced to Super Sixes
4	Nepal	4	1	3	0	0	2	−0.893	Advanced to 7th–10th Play-offs
5	Hong Kong	4	1	3	0	0	2	−1.121	Advanced to 7th–10th Play-offs

Source: ESPNcricinfo

==== Fixtures ====
4 March 2018
09:30
Scorecard

Zimbabwe; 380/6 (50 overs)	v	Nepal; 264/8 (50 overs)
Sikandar Raza 123 (66); Basanta Regmi 2/69 (10 overs)		Sharad Vesawkar 52 (48); Sikandar Raza 3/48 (10 overs)

Zimbabwe won by 116 runs
Queens Sports Club, Bulawayo
Umpires: Gregory Brathwaite (WI) and Chettithody Shamshuddin (Ind)
Player of the match: Sikandar Raza (Zim)

- Zimbabwe won the toss and elected to bat.
- Lalit Rajbanshi (Nep) made his List A debut.

4 March 2018
09:30
Scorecard

Afghanistan; 255 (49.4 overs)	v	Scotland; 256/3 (47.2 overs)
Mohammad Nabi 92 (82); Brad Wheal 3/36 (9.4 overs)		Calum MacLeod 157* (146); Mujeeb Ur Rahman 2/47 (10 overs)

Scotland won by 7 wickets
Bulawayo Athletic Club, Bulawayo
Umpires: Joel Wilson (WI) and Paul Wilson (Aus)
Player of the match: Calum MacLeod (Sco)

- Scotland won the toss and elected to field.
- Rashid Khan captained Afghanistan for the first time in an ODI and at the age of 19 years and 165 days, he became the youngest player to captain an international side.
- The 208-run stand for the third wicket between Calum MacLeod and Richie Berrington was Scotland's highest for any wicket in ODIs.

6 March 2018
09:30
Scorecard

Zimbabwe; 196 (43 overs)	v	Afghanistan; 194 (49.3 overs)
Brendan Taylor 89 (88); Rashid Khan 3/38 (8 overs)		Rahmat Shah 69 (91); Blessing Muzarabani 4/47 (10 overs)

Zimbabwe won by 2 runs
Queens Sports Club, Bulawayo
Umpires: Chris Brown (NZ) and Chettithody Shamshuddin (Ind)
Player of the match: Sikandar Raza (Zim)

- Zimbabwe won the toss and elected to bat.

6 March 2018
09:30
Scorecard

Hong Kong; 91 (38.2 overs)	v	Scotland; 92/6 (23.3 overs)
Nizakat Khan 26 (40); Tom Sole 4/15 (10 overs)		Kyle Coetzer 41* (60); Ehsan Khan 3/29 (6 overs)

Scotland won by 4 wickets
Bulawayo Athletic Club, Bulawayo
Umpires: Adrian Holdstock (SA) and Joel Wilson (WI)
Player of the match: Tom Sole (Sco)

- Scotland won the toss and elected to field.

8 March 2018
09:30
Scorecard

Nepal; 149 (50 overs)	v	Scotland; 153/6 (41.3 overs)
Paras Khadka 63 (75); Stuart Whittingham 3/35 (10 overs)		Kyle Coetzer 88* (136); Basanta Regmi 2/26 (10 overs)

Scotland won by 4 wickets
Queens Sports Club, Bulawayo
Umpires: Chris Brown (NZ) and Adrian Holdstock (SA)
Player of the match: Paras Khadka (Nepal)

- Nepal won the toss and elected to bat.
- Paras Khadka became the first batsman for Nepal to score 1,000 runs in List A cricket.
- Scotland qualified for the Super Sixes as a result of this match.

8 March 2018
09:30
Scorecard

Hong Kong; 241/8 (50 overs)	v	Afghanistan; 195/9 (46 overs)
Anshuman Rath 65 (90); Mujeeb Ur Rahman 3/26 (10 overs)		Dawlat Zadran 40* (30); Ehsan Khan 4/33 (9 overs)

Hong Kong won by 30 runs (DLS)
Bulawayo Athletic Club, Bulawayo
Umpires: Gregory Brathwaite (WI) and Paul Wilson (Aus)
Player of the match: Ehsan Khan (HK)

- Afghanistan won the toss and elected to field.
- Afghanistan were set a revised target of 226 runs from 46 overs due to rain.
- This was Hong Kong's first win against a Full Member side in ODIs.

10 March 2018
09:30
Scorecard

Zimbabwe; 263/9 (50 overs)	v	Hong Kong; 174 (46.5 overs)
Hamilton Masakadza 84 (110); Ehsan Nawaz 4/47 (9 overs)		Anshuman Rath 85 (117); Sikandar Raza 3/30 (10 overs)

Zimbabwe won by 89 runs
Queens Sports Club, Bulawayo
Umpires: Gregory Brathwaite (WI) and Joel Wilson (WI)
Player of the match: Hamilton Masakadza (Zim)

- Hong Kong won the toss and elected to field.
- Zimbabwe qualified for the Super Sixes as a result of this match.

10 March 2018
09:30
Scorecard

Nepal; 194 (49.5 overs)	v	Afghanistan; 195/4 (38.4 overs)
Paras Khadka 75 (82); Mohammad Nabi 4/33 (10 overs)		Najibullah Zadran 52* (47); Dipendra Airee 2/25 (6 overs)

Afghanistan won by 6 wickets
Bulawayo Athletic Club, Bulawayo
Umpires: Adrian Holdstock (SA) and Paul Wilson (Aus)
Player of the match: Mohammad Nabi (Afg)

- Nepal won the toss and elected to bat.

12 March 2018
09:30
Scorecard

Hong Kong; 153 (48.2 overs)	v	Nepal; 155/5 (40.4 overs)
Nizakat Khan 47 (84); Sandeep Lamichhane 3/17 (10 overs)		Rohit Paudel 44* (86); Ehsan Khan 2/29 (7 overs)

Nepal won by 5 wickets
Bulawayo Athletic Club, Bulawayo
Umpires: Chris Brown (NZ) and Joel Wilson (WI)
Player of the match: Rohit Paudel (Nep)

- Hong Kong won the toss and elected to bat.
- Simandeep Singh (HK) made his List A debut.
- Afghanistan qualified for the Super Sixes as a result of this match, with Hong Kong and Nepal advancing to the playoff semi-finals.

12 March 2018
09:30
Scorecard

Zimbabwe; 210 (46.4 overs)	v	Scotland; 210 (49.1 overs)
Craig Ervine 57 (69); Safyaan Sharif 5/33 (8.4 overs)		Richie Berrington 47 (76); Graeme Cremer 3/21 (10 overs)

Match tied
Queens Sports Club, Bulawayo
Umpires: Gregory Brathwaite (WI) and Paul Wilson (Aus)
Player of the match: Safyaan Sharif (Sco)

- Zimbabwe won the toss and elected to bat.
- Safyaan Sharif (Sco) took his first five-wicket haul in ODIs.

== Play-offs ==
15 March 2018
09:30
Scorecard

Papua New Guinea; 114 (27.2 overs)	v	Nepal; 115/4 (23 overs)
Charles Amini 19 (18); Dipendra Airee 4/14 (4.2 overs)		Dipendra Airee 50* (58); Norman Vanua 2/25 (6 overs)

Nepal won by 6 wickets
Old Hararians, Harare
Umpires: Langton Rusere (Zim) and Sharfuddoula (Ban)
Player of the match: Dipendra Airee (Nep)

- Nepal won the toss and elected to field.
- Nepal gained ODI status until 2023 and Papua New Guinea lost their ODI status as a result of this match.

15 March 2018
09:30
Scorecard

Netherlands; 174 (48.2 overs)	v	Hong Kong; 130 (43 overs)
Max O'Dowd 62 (71); Nadeem Ahmed 3/20 (10 overs)		Babar Hayat 52 (94); Roelof van der Merwe 4/18 (7 overs)

Netherlands won by 44 runs
Kwekwe Sports Club, Kwekwe
Umpires: Chris Brown (NZ) and Adrian Holdstock (SA)
Player of the match: Max O'Dowd (Ned)

- Netherlands won the toss and elected to bat.
- Hong Kong lost their ODI status as a result of this match.

9th/10th position play-off
17 March 2018
09:30
Scorecard

Papua New Guinea; 200 (48.2 overs)	v	Hong Kong; 142 (35.2 overs)
Tony Ura 49 (59); Kinchit Shah 4/11 (3.2 overs)		Babar Hayat 37 (25); Charles Amini 4/27 (10 overs)

Papua New Guinea won by 58 runs
Old Hararians, Harare
Umpires: Langton Rusere (Zim) and Sharfuddoula (Ban)
Player of the match: Charles Amini (PNG)

- Papua New Guinea won the toss and elected to bat.
- Simandeep Singh (HK) made his ODI debut.
- This was the 4,000th ODI match to be played.

7th/8th position play-off
17 March 2018
09:30
Scorecard

Netherlands; 189/9 (50 overs)	v	Nepal; 144 (44.4 overs)
Bas de Leede 39 (91); Sompal Kami 4/24 (10 overs)		Sompal Kami 36 (53); Roelof van der Merwe 4/19 (9 overs)

Netherlands won by 45 runs
Kwekwe Sports Club, Kwekwe
Umpires: Chris Brown (NZ) and Adrian Holdstock (SA)
Player of the match: Roelof van der Merwe (Ned)

- Netherlands won the toss and elected to bat.

== Super Sixes ==
Teams that advance to the Super Six play three further matches against the qualifiers from the other group, with the two results against teams from their own group carrying forward from the group stage. Teams also carried forward their seeding positions from the first stage to determine the fixtures for the Super Six.

=== Points table ===
Pos	Team	Pld	W	L	T	NR	Pts	NRR	Qualification
1	West Indies	5	4	1	0	0	8	0.472	Advance to the Final and qualify for 2019 World Cup
2	Afghanistan	5	3	2	0	0	6	0.302	Advance to the Final and qualify for 2019 World Cup
3	Zimbabwe	5	2	2	1	0	5	0.420	
4	Scotland	5	2	2	1	0	5	0.243	
5	Ireland	5	2	3	0	0	4	0.346	
6	United Arab Emirates	5	1	4	0	0	2	−1.950	

Source: ICC

=== Fixtures ===
15 March 2018
09:30
Scorecard

West Indies; 197/8 (50 overs)	v	Afghanistan; 198/7 (47.4 overs)
Shai Hope 43 (94); Mujeeb Ur Rahman 3/33 (10 overs)		Rahmat Shah 68 (109); Jason Holder 3/39 (10 overs)

Afghanistan won by 3 wickets
Harare Sports Club, Harare
Umpires: Michael Gough (Eng) and Ahsan Raza (Pak)
Player of the match: Mujeeb Ur Rahman (AFG)

- West Indies won the toss and elected to bat.
- Keemo Paul (WI) made his ODI debut.
- Jason Holder (WI) became the fastest player for the West Indies, in terms of matches, to score 1,000 runs and take 100 wickets in ODIs (74).

15 March 2018
09:30
Scorecard

Scotland; 322/6 (50 overs)	v	United Arab Emirates; 249 (47.4 overs)
Matthew Cross 114 (135); Rohan Mustafa 4/56 (10 overs)		Muhammad Usman 80 (91); Chris Sole 4/68 (8 overs)

Scotland won by 73 runs
Queens Sports Club, Bulawayo
Umpires: Gregory Brathwaite (WI) and Joel Wilson (WI)
Player of the match: Matthew Cross (Sco)

- Scotland won the toss and elected to bat.
- United Arab Emirates could no longer qualify for the final as a result of this match.

16 March 2018
09:30
Scorecard

Zimbabwe; 211/9 (50 overs)	v	Ireland; 104 (34.2 overs)
Sikandar Raza 69* (83); Tim Murtagh 3/36 (10 overs)		Paul Stirling 41 (70); Graeme Cremer 3/18 (8.2 overs)

Zimbabwe won by 107 runs
Harare Sports Club, Harare
Umpires: Simon Fry (Aus) and Shaun George (SA)
Player of the match: Sikandar Raza (Zim)

- Ireland won the toss and elected to field.

18 March 2018
09:30
Scorecard

Ireland; 271/9 (50 overs)	v	Scotland; 246 (47.4 overs)
Andrew Balbirnie 105 (146); Brad Wheal 3/43 (10 overs)		Kyle Coetzer 61 (70); Boyd Rankin 4/63 (9.4 overs)

Ireland won by 25 runs
Harare Sports Club, Harare
Umpires: Gregory Brathwaite (WI) and Paul Wilson (Aus)
Player of the match: Andrew Balbirnie (Ire)

- Scotland won the toss and elected to field.

19 March 2018
09:30
Scorecard

Zimbabwe; 289 (50 overs)	v	West Indies; 290/6 (49 overs)
Brendan Taylor 138 (124); Jason Holder 4/35 (10 overs)		Marlon Samuels 86 (80); Blessing Muzarabani 2/36 (9 overs)

West Indies won by 4 wickets
Harare Sports Club, Harare
Umpires: Michael Gough (Eng) and Simon Fry (Aus)
Player of the match: Marlon Samuels (WI)

- Zimbabwe won the toss and elected to bat.
- Sean Williams (Zim) scored his 3,000th run in ODIs.
- Brendan Taylor (Zim) scored his tenth century in ODIs.
- This was the West Indies' fifth-highest successful run-chase in ODIs.

20 March 2018
09:30
Scorecard

United Arab Emirates; 177 (43 overs)	v	Afghanistan; 178/5 (34.3 overs)
Shaiman Anwar 64 (87); Rashid Khan 5/41 (9 overs)		Gulbadin Naib 74* (97); Mohammad Naveed 2/37 (8 overs)

Afghanistan won by 5 wickets
Old Hararians, Harare
Umpires: Gregory Brathwaite (WI) and Adrian Holdstock (SA)
Player of the match: Gulbadin Naib (AFG)

- United Arab Emirates won the toss and elected to bat.

21 March 2018
09:30
Scorecard

West Indies; 198 (48.4 overs)	v	Scotland; 125/5 (32.5 overs)
Evin Lewis 66 (87); Safyaan Sharif 3/27 (9 overs)		Richie Berrington 33 (68); Kemar Roach 2/20 (7 overs)

West Indies won by 5 runs (DLS)
Harare Sports Club, Harare
Umpires: Shaun George (SA) and Paul Wilson (Aus)
Player of the match: Safyaan Sharif (Sco)

- Scotland won the toss and elected to field.
- West Indies qualified for the 2019 ICC Cricket World Cup as a result of this match.
- Scotland could no longer qualify for the final as a result of this match.

22 March 2018
09:30
Scorecard

United Arab Emirates; 235/7 (47.5 overs)	v	Zimbabwe; 226/7 (40 overs)
Rameez Shahzad 59 (61); Sikandar Raza 3/41 (10 overs)		Sean Williams 80 (80); Mohammad Naveed 3/40 (8 overs)

United Arab Emirates won by 3 runs (DLS)
Harare Sports Club, Harare
Umpires: Gregory Brathwaite (WI) and Ahsan Raza (Pak)
Player of the match: Mohammad Naveed (UAE)

- Zimbabwe won the toss and elected to field.
- Zimbabwe were set a revised target of 230 runs from 40 overs due to rain.
- Shaiman Anwar became the first batsman for the United Arab Emirates to score 1,000 runs in ODIs.
- This was the United Arab Emirates' first win against a Full Member side in ODIs.

23 March 2018
09:30
Scorecard

Ireland; 209/7 (50 overs)	v	Afghanistan; 213/5 (49.1 overs)
Paul Stirling 55 (87); Rashid Khan 3/40 (10 overs)		Mohammad Shehzad 54 (66); Simi Singh 3/30 (10 overs)

Afghanistan won by 5 wickets
Harare Sports Club, Harare
Umpires: Michael Gough (Eng) and Joel Wilson (WI)
Player of the match: Mohammad Shahzad (AFG)

- Ireland won the toss and elected to bat.
- Niall O'Brien (Ire) played in his 100th ODI.
- Afghanistan qualified for the 2019 ICC Cricket World Cup as a result of this match.
- Ireland and Zimbabwe could no longer qualify for the final as a result of this match.

== Final ==
25 March 2018
09:30
Scorecard

West Indies; 204 (46.5 overs)	v	Afghanistan; 206/3 (40.4 overs)
Rovman Powell 44 (75); Mujeeb Ur Rahman 4/43 (9.5 overs)		Mohammad Shahzad 84 (93); Chris Gayle 2/38 (5.4 overs)

Afghanistan won by 7 wickets
Harare Sports Club, Harare
Umpires: Simon Fry (Aus) Michael Gough (Eng)
Player of the match: Mohammad Shahzad (Afg)

- West Indies won the toss and elected to bat.
- Shai Hope (WI) scored his 1,000th run in ODIs.
- Rashid Khan (Afg) took his 100th wicket in ODIs.

== Final standings ==
These were the final standings at the end of the tournament:

Position	Team	Result
1st	Afghanistan	Qualified for the 2019 Cricket World Cup
2nd	West Indies	Qualified for the 2019 Cricket World Cup
3rd	Zimbabwe	
4th	Scotland	Retained ODI status until 2023
5th	Ireland	
6th	United Arab Emirates	Retained ODI status until 2023
7th	Netherlands	Gained ODI status until 2023
8th	Nepal	Gained ODI status until 2023
9th	Papua New Guinea	Relegated to Division Two and lost ODI status
10th	Hong Kong	Relegated to Division Two and lost ODI status

Note: Remaining teams already had ODI status until at least 2023.
