= Zimbabwean cricket team in Scotland in 2017 =

International cricket tour

	Scotland	Zimbabwe
- Dates: 15 – 17 June 2017
Captains	Kyle Coetzer	Graeme Cremer

One Day International series
- Results: 2-match series drawn 1–1
Most runs	Kyle Coetzer (170)	Malcolm Waller (92)
Most wickets	Con de Lange (5)	Graeme Cremer (6)

The Zimbabwe cricket team toured Scotland in June 2017 to play two One Day International (ODI) matches. Both matches were played at The Grange Club, Edinburgh. It was the first bilateral series between the two teams. In the first match, Scotland beat Zimbabwe on the back of a Kyle Coetzer century, recording their first win in an ODI against a Test playing nation. The series finished 1–1, with Zimbabwe winning the second match by 6 wickets.

== Squads ==
Scotland	Zimbabwe
Kyle Coetzer (c); Richie Berrington; Matthew Cross (wk); Josh Davey; Alasdair Evans; Con de Lange; Michael Leask; Calum MacLeod; Preston Mommsen; George Munsey; Safyaan Sharif; Chris Sole; Craig Wallace; Mark Watt	Graeme Cremer (c); Ryan Burl; Tendai Chatara; Chamu Chibhabha; Craig Ervine; Hamilton Masakadza; Solomon Mire; Peter Moor (wk); Christopher Mpofu; Tarisai Musakanda; Richard Ngarava; Sikandar Raza; Donald Tiripano; Malcolm Waller; Sean Williams

== ODI series ==
=== 1st ODI ===
15 June 2017
Scorecard

Scotland; 317/6 (50 overs)	v	Zimbabwe; 272 (41.4 overs)
Kyle Coetzer 109 (101); Sean Williams 2/48 (10 overs)		Malcolm Waller 92 (62); Con de Lange 5/60 (8 overs)

Scotland won by 26 runs (DLS method)
The Grange Club, Edinburgh
Umpires: Ruchira Palliyaguruge (SL) and Ian Ramage (Sco)

- Scotland won the toss and elected to bat.
- Rain during Zimbabwe's innings set them a revised target of 299 runs in 43 overs.
- Con de Lange (Sco) took his first five-wicket haul in an ODI.
- This was the first ODI match between the two sides and Scotland's first ever win in an ODI against a Test playing nation.

=== 2nd ODI ===
17 June 2017
Scorecard

Scotland; 169 (42 overs)	v	Zimbabwe; 171/4 (37 overs)
Kyle Coetzer 61 (60); Graeme Cremer 5/29 (10 overs)		Sikandar Raza 58* (88); Chris Sole 3/36 (9 overs)

Zimbabwe won by 6 wickets
The Grange Club, Edinburgh
Umpires: Ruchira Palliyaguruge (SL) and Ian Ramage (Sco)

- Scotland won the toss and elected to bat.
