= Stuart Coetzer =

Scottish cricketer

Personal information
- Full name: Stuart Charles Coetzer
- Born: 31 January 1982 (age 44); Grahamstown, Cape Province, South Africa
- Batting: Right-handed
- Role: Wicket-keeper
- Relatives: Kyle Coetzer (brother); Grant Dugmore (uncle)

Domestic team information
- Years: Team
- 2004: Scotland

Career statistics
Competition	List A
Matches	4
Runs scored	27
Batting average	13.50
100s/50s	–/–
Top score	21*
Catches/stumpings	–/–
- Source: Cricinfo, 14 June 2022

Stuart Charles Coetzer (born 31 January 1982) is a Scottish former cricketer.

The son of Peter Coetzer, he was born in South Africa at Grahamstown. He moved to Scotland when his family emigrated in 1984. Having played age-group cricket for Scotland from under-13 level, Coetzer was selected for the Scotland national under-19 squad for the 2002 Under-19 Cricket World Cup in New Zealand, making four appearances in the tournament. Coetzer featured for the Scottish senior team in two minor matches against Bangladesh, as part of their warm-up for the 2004 ICC Champions Trophy.

In the same year, he made four List A one-day appearances against English county opposition in the 2004 totesport League, scoring 27 runs with a highest score of 21 not out. There followed a period were Coetzer lost interest in the sport, but returned to his club Stoneywood-Dyce in 2010, where he began to coach young players, including future Scotland international Michael Leask. His younger brother is the former Scotland cricket captain Kyle Coetzer, while he has family connections in Argentina with the Dugmore cricketing family, which includes his uncle Grant Dugmore.
