= 2024 Netherlands T20I Tri-Nation Series =

- Date: 18–24 May 2024
- Location: Netherlands
- Result: Ireland won the tournament
Teams
Netherlands	Ireland	Scotland
Captains
Scott Edwards	Paul Stirling	Richie Berrington
Most runs
Max O'Dowd (123)	Lorcan Tucker (99)	Matthew Cross (98)
Most wickets
Logan van Beek (8)	Mark Adair (7)	Chris Sole (6)

The 2024 Netherlands Tri-Nation Series was a cricket tournament that took place in the Netherlands in May 2024. It was a tri-nation series involving Netherlands, Ireland and Scotland men's cricket teams, with the matches played as Twenty20 International (T20I) fixtures. The series used by the teams as preparation ahead of the 2024 ICC Men's T20 World Cup. In March 2024, the Royal Dutch Cricket Association (KNCB) confirmed the fixtures for the tournament, with all the matches to be played at VRA Cricket Ground. However, on 1 May 2024, the KNCB announced that due to unspecified circumstances the series would be played at Sportpark Westvliet.

Ireland won the series with a game to spare. They went on to defeat Netherlands in the last match to finish the tournament unbeaten.

== Squads ==
Netherlands	Ireland	Scotland
Scott Edwards (c, wk); Wesley Barresi (wk); Bas de Leede; Daniel Doram; Aryan Dutt; Sybrand Engelbrecht; Vivian Kingma; Fred Klaassen; Michael Levitt; Teja Nidamanuru; Max O'Dowd; Tim Pringle; Vikramjit Singh; Logan van Beek; Paul van Meekeren	Paul Stirling (c); Mark Adair; Ross Adair; Andrew Balbirnie; Curtis Campher; Gareth Delany; George Dockrell; Fionn Hand; ~~Graham Hume~~; Barry McCarthy; Neil Rock (wk); Harry Tector; Lorcan Tucker (wk); Ben White; Craig Young	Richie Berrington (c); Matthew Cross (wk); Brad Currie; Chris Greaves; Oli Hairs; Jack Jarvis; Michael Leask; Gavin Main; Brandon McMullen; George Munsey; Safyaan Sharif; Chris Sole; Charlie Tear (wk); Mark Watt

Graham Hume was ruled out of the tournament due to visa delay, Fionn Hand was added to the squad as his replacement.

== Points table ==
Pos	Team	Pld	W	L	NR	Pts	NRR
1	Ireland	4	3	0	1	7	0.149
2	Scotland	4	1	2	1	3	0.426
3	Netherlands	4	1	3	0	2	−0.425

Source: ESPNcricinfo

== Fixtures ==
=== 1st T20I ===
18 May 2024
17:00 (D/N)
Scorecard

Netherlands; 167/8 (20 overs)	v	Scotland; 126 (18.1 overs)
Michael Levitt 43 (31); Gavin Main 2/26 (4 overs)		Matthew Cross 49 (32); Vivian Kingma 4/21 (3.1 overs)

Netherlands won by 41 runs
Sportpark Westvliet, Voorburg
Umpires: Nitin Bathi (Ned) and Pim van Liemt (Ned)
Player of the match: Vivian Kingma (Ned)

- Scotland won the toss and elected to field.
- Daniel Doram (Ned) made his T20I debut.

=== 2nd T20I ===
19 May 2024
17:00 (D/N)
Scorecard

Ireland; 150/8 (20 overs)	v	Netherlands; 149/8 (20 overs)
Mark Adair 49 (24); Tim Pringle 3/32 (4 overs)		Tim Pringle 35* (13); Fionn Hand 3/18 (4 overs)

Ireland won by 1 run
Sportpark Westvliet, Voorburg
Umpires: Rizwan Akram (Ned) and Pim van Liemt (Ned)
Player of the match: Mark Adair (Ire)

- Netherlands won the toss and elected to field.

=== 3rd T20I ===
20 May 2024
17:00 (D/N)
Scorecard

Ireland	v	Scotland

Match abandoned
Sportpark Westvliet, Voorburg
Umpires: Rizwan Akram (Ned) and Nitin Bathi (Ned)

- No toss.
- No play was possible due to rain.

=== 4th T20I ===
22 May 2024
17:00 (D/N)
Scorecard

Scotland; 158/7 (20 overs)	v	Netherlands; 87 (14.5 overs)
George Munsey 72 (44); Logan van Beek 3/13 (4 overs)		Scott Edwards 29 (25); Mark Watt 4/12 (3.5 overs)

Scotland won by 71 runs
Sportpark Westvliet, Voorburg
Umpires: Nitin Bathi (Ned) and Pim van Liemt (Ned)
Player of the match: George Munsey (Sco)

- Netherlands won the toss and elected to field.

=== 5th T20I ===
23 May 2024
11:00
Scorecard

Scotland; 157/8 (20 overs)	v	Ireland; 158/5 (19.3 overs)
Matthew Cross 35 (30); Craig Young 3/31 (4 overs)		Andrew Balbirnie 56 (46); Safyaan Sharif 1/26 (3.3 overs)

Ireland won by 5 wickets
Sportpark Westvliet, Voorburg
Umpires: Rizwan Akram (Ned) and Pim van Liemt (Ned)
Player of the match: Andrew Balbirnie (Ire)

- Scotland won the toss and elected to bat.

=== 6th T20I ===
24 May 2024
11:00
Scorecard

Ireland; 161/6 (20 overs)	v	Netherlands; 158/5 (20 overs)
George Dockrell 53* (30); Logan van Beek 2/26 (4 overs)		Max O'Dowd 60 (41); Mark Adair 2/21 (4 overs)

Ireland won by 3 runs
Sportpark Westvliet, Voorburg
Umpires: Rizwan Akram (Ned) and Nitin Bathi (Ned)
Player of the match: George Dockrell (Ire)

- Netherlands won the toss and elected to field.
