= 2024 Netherlands Tri-Nation Series =

The 2024 Netherlands Tri-Nation Series can refer to:

- 2024 Netherlands T20I Tri-Nation Series, a tri-nation cricket series being held in May 2024 involving the men's national teams of Netherlands, Ireland and Scotland
- 2024 Netherlands Tri-Nation Series (Cricket World Cup League 2), the 4th round of the 2024–2026 ICC Men's Cricket World Cup League 2 tournament, to be held in August 2024
