= Australian cricket team in the United Arab Emirates in 2018–19 =

International cricket tour

Australian cricket team against Pakistan in 2018–19
	Pakistan	Australia
- Dates: 29 September 2018 – 28 October 2018
Captains	Sarfaraz Ahmed	Tim Paine (Tests); Aaron Finch (T20Is)

Test series
- Result: Pakistan won the 2-match series 1–0
Most runs	Sarfaraz Ahmed (190)	Usman Khawaja (229)
Most wickets	Mohammad Abbas (17)	Nathan Lyon (12)
- Player of the series: Mohammad Abbas (Pak)

Twenty20 International series
- Results: Pakistan won the 3-match series 3–0
Most runs	Babar Azam (163)	Nathan Coulter-Nile (61)
Most wickets	Shadab Khan (6)	Billy Stanlake (5)
- Player of the series: Babar Azam (Pak)

The Australian cricket team toured the United Arab Emirates from September to October 2018 to play two Tests and three Twenty20 International (T20I) matches against Pakistan. Ahead of the Test series, there was a four-day practice match in Dubai.

In February 2018, the Pakistan Cricket Board (PCB) looked at the possibility of hosting this series and New Zealand's tour to the UAE in Malaysia instead of the UAE, due to domestic Twenty20 fixture congestion in Sharjah. In May 2018, the PCB invited Australia to play the fixtures in Pakistan, but Cricket Australia said it would not allow matches to be moved there. In June 2018, the PCB and the Emirates Cricket Board (ECB) agreed to play Pakistan's future matches in the UAE.

In September 2018, both Mitchell Marsh and Josh Hazlewood were appointed joint vice-captains of the Australia Test cricket team. The following month, both Mitchell Marsh and Alex Carey were appointed joint vice-captains of the Australia T20I cricket team.

During the second Test match, an extra T20I match for Australia against the United Arab Emirates was added to the tour itinerary. Australia were scheduled to play the UAE in a Twenty20 warm-up match before the T20I series against Pakistan, when the match was upgraded to a full T20I fixture. It was the first time that the UAE played a full T20I match against Australia. Australia won the one-off match by seven wickets.

Pakistan won the Test series 1–0 via a comprehensive 373-run triumph in the second Test, after the first match ended in a draw. Pakistan won the T20I series against Australia 3–0.

== Squads ==
Tests		T20Is		
Pakistan	Australia	Pakistan	Australia	United Arab Emirates
Sarfaraz Ahmed (c, wk); Mohammad Abbas; Azhar Ali; Hasan Ali; Faheem Ashraf; Bilal Asif; Babar Azam; Mohammad Hafeez; Mir Hamza; Shadab Khan; Wahab Riaz; Mohammad Rizwan; Usman Salahuddin; Asad Shafiq; Yasir Shah; Haris Sohail; Imam-ul-Haq; Fakhar Zaman	Tim Paine (c, wk); Mitchell Marsh (vc); Ashton Agar; Brendan Doggett; Aaron Finch; Travis Head; Jon Holland; Usman Khawaja; Marnus Labuschagne; Nathan Lyon; Shaun Marsh; Michael Neser; Matt Renshaw; Peter Siddle; Mitchell Starc	Sarfaraz Ahmed (c, wk); Shaheen Afridi; Asif Ali; Hasan Ali; Faheem Ashraf; Babar Azam; Sahibzada Farhan; Mohammad Hafeez; Shadab Khan; Usman Khan; Shoaib Malik; Waqas Maqsood; Hussain Talat; Imad Wasim; Fakhar Zaman	Aaron Finch (c); Mitchell Marsh (vc); Alex Carey (vc, wk); Ashton Agar; Nathan Coulter-Nile; Chris Lynn; Nathan Lyon; Glenn Maxwell; Ben McDermott; D'Arcy Short; Peter Siddle; Billy Stanlake; Mitchell Starc; Andrew Tye; Adam Zampa	Rohan Mustafa (c); Ashfaq Ahmed; Qadeer Ahmed; Shaiman Anwar; Imran Haider; Amir Hayat; Amjad Khan; Zahoor Khan; Mohammad Naveed; Fahad Nawaz; Ahmed Raza; Ghulam Shabber (wk); Rameez Shahzad; Tahir Sultan; Chirag Suri

After Pakistan's Test squad was named, Mohammad Hafeez was later added to the team. Imam-ul-Haq fractured his finger while fielding in the first match, and was ruled out of Pakistan's squad for the second Test. Peter Siddle was added to Australia's T20I squad as cover for Mitchell Starc.

== Four-day match: Pakistan A vs Australia ==
29 September–2 October 2018
Scorecard

Pakistan A	v	Australia
278 (99.1 overs); Abid Ali 85 (263); Nathan Lyon 8/103 (39.1 overs)		494/4d (170 overs); Mitchell Marsh 162 (298); Waqas Maqsood 2/66 (24 overs)
261/7 (85 overs); Asad Shafiq 69 (151); Jon Holland 5/79 (25 overs)

Match drawn
ICC Academy Ground, Dubai
Umpires: Ahsan Raza (Pak) and Shozab Raza (Pak)

- Pakistan A won the toss and elected to bat.

== Test series ==
=== 1st Test ===
7–11 October 2018
Scorecard

Pakistan	v	Australia
482 (164.2 overs); Mohammad Hafeez 126 (208); Peter Siddle 3/58 (29 overs)		202 (83.3 overs); Usman Khawaja 85 (175); Bilal Asif 6/36 (21.3 overs)
181/6d (57.5 overs); Imam-ul-Haq 48 (104); Jon Holland 3/83 (20 overs)		362/8 (139.5 overs); Usman Khawaja 141 (302); Yasir Shah 4/114 (43.5 overs)

Match drawn
Dubai International Cricket Stadium, Dubai
Umpires: Richard Illingworth (Eng) and Richard Kettleborough (Eng)
Player of the match: Usman Khawaja (Aus)

- Pakistan won the toss and elected to bat.
- Bilal Asif (Pak), Aaron Finch, Travis Head and Marnus Labuschagne (Aus) all made their Test debuts.
- Mohammad Hafeez (Pak) scored his tenth century in Tests.
- Haris Sohail (Pak) scored his first century in Tests.
- Bilal Asif became the 11th bowler for Pakistan to take a five-wicket haul on debut in Tests.

=== 2nd Test ===
16–20 October 2018 (Note: While five days of play were scheduled for each Test, the second Test reached a result in four days.)
Scorecard

Pakistan	v	Australia
282 (81 overs); Sarfaraz Ahmed 94 (129); Nathan Lyon 4/78 (27 overs)		145 (50.4 overs); Aaron Finch 39 (83); Mohammad Abbas 5/33 (12.4 overs)
400/9d (120 overs); Babar Azam 99 (171); Nathan Lyon 4/135 (43 overs)		164 (49.4 overs); Marnus Labuschagne 43 (78); Mohammad Abbas 5/62 (17 overs)

Pakistan won by 373 runs
Sheikh Zayed Cricket Stadium, Abu Dhabi
Umpires: Richard Illingworth (Eng) and Sundaram Ravi (Ind)
Player of the match: Mohammad Abbas (Pak)

- Pakistan won the toss and elected to bat.
- Mir Hamza and Fakhar Zaman (Pak) both made their Test debuts.
- Mohammad Abbas became the joint-quickest fast bowler, in terms of matches played, to take 50 wickets for Pakistan in Tests (10).
- Abbas also took his first ten-wicket haul in Tests

== T20I series ==
=== United Arab Emirates vs Australia ===
==== Only T20I ====
22 October 2018
14:00
Scorecard

United Arab Emirates; 117/6 (20 overs)	v	Australia; 119/3 (16.1 overs)
Shaiman Anwar 41 (44); Nathan Coulter-Nile 2/20 (4 overs); Billy Stanlake 2/20 (4 overs)		D'Arcy Short 68* (53); Amir Hayat 2/26 (4 overs)

Australia won by 7 wickets
Sheikh Zayed Stadium Nursery 2, Abu Dhabi
Umpires: Akbar Ali (UAE) and Iftikhar Ali (UAE)
Player of the match: D'Arcy Short (Aus)

- United Arab Emirates won the toss and elected to bat.
- Ashfaq Ahmed, Chirag Suri, Amir Hayat (UAE) and Ben McDermott (Aus) all made their T20I debuts.
- Glenn Maxwell (Aus) played in his 50th T20I.

=== Pakistan vs Australia ===
==== 1st T20I ====
24 October 2018
20:00 (N)
Scorecard

Pakistan; 155/8 (20 overs)	v	Australia; 89 (16.5 overs)
Babar Azam 68* (55); Billy Stanlake 3/21 (4 overs)		Nathan Coulter-Nile 34 (29); Imad Wasim 3/20 (4 overs)

Pakistan won by 66 runs
Sheikh Zayed Cricket Stadium, Abu Dhabi
Umpires: Ahsan Raza (Pak) and Shozab Raza (Pak)
Player of the match: Imad Wasim (Pak)

- Australia won the toss and elected to field.

==== 2nd T20I ====
26 October 2018
20:00 (N)
Scorecard

Pakistan; 147/6 (20 overs)	v	Australia; 136/8 (20 overs)
Babar Azam 45 (44); Nathan Coulter-Nile 3/18 (3 overs)		Glenn Maxwell 52 (37); Shadab Khan 2/30 (4 overs)

Pakistan won by 11 runs
Dubai International Cricket Stadium, Dubai
Umpires: Ahsan Raza (Pak) and Asif Yaqoob (Pak)
Player of the match: Imad Wasim (Pak)

- Pakistan won the toss and elected to bat.

==== 3rd T20I ====
28 October 2018
20:00 (N)
Scorecard

Pakistan; 150/5 (20 overs)	v	Australia; 117 (19.1 overs)
Babar Azam 50 (40); Mitchell Marsh 2/6 (1 over)		Ben McDermott 21 (20); Shadab Khan 3/19 (4 overs)

Pakistan won by 33 runs
Dubai International Cricket Stadium, Dubai
Umpires: Shozab Raza (Pak) and Rashid Riaz (Pak)
Player of the match: Shadab Khan (Pak)

- Pakistan won the toss and elected to bat.

== In popular culture ==
An Australian docu-series - The Test was produced, following the Australian national cricket team in the aftermath of the Australian ball tampering scandal. The second episode of Season 1 featured Australia playing the 2 tests against Pakistan in the UAE.
