= English cricket team in Scotland in 2014 =

England in Scotland in 2014
	England	Scotland
- Date: 9 May 2014
Captains	Alastair Cook	Kyle Coetzer

One Day International series
- Results: England won the 1-match series 1–0
Most runs	Ian Bell (50)	Michael Leask (42)
Most wickets	Josh Davey (3)	James Tredwell (4)
- Player of the series: Michael Leask (Sco)

The England cricket team played a One Day International (ODI) match against Scotland on 9 May 2014 as a warm-up for their series against Sri Lanka and India later in the summer of 2014. The match was played at Mannofield Park in Aberdeen, the 11th ODI to be played at the ground, with one match that was abandoned. England won the rain-affected game by 39 runs. After the match, England captain Alastair Cook said that due to the rain the match "probably wasn't fit to play, if you are being totally honest. But just in a one-off game, with not so much riding on it, I think it was the right decision to play".

== Squads ==
Scotland	England
Kyle Coetzer (c); Freddie Coleman; Matty Cross (wk); Josh Davey; Alasdair Evans; Majid Haq; Michael Leask; Matt Machan; Calum MacLeod; Preston Mommsen; Safyaan Sharif; Rob Taylor; Iain Wardlaw	Alastair Cook (c); Moeen Ali; James Anderson; Gary Ballance; Ian Bell; Ravi Bopara; Jos Buttler (wk); Harry Gurney; Chris Jordan; Eoin Morgan; Joe Root; James Tredwell; Chris Woakes

== ODI series ==
=== Only ODI ===
9 May 2014
10:30
Scorecard

England; 167/6 (20 overs)	v	Scotland; 133/9 (20 overs)
Ian Bell 50 (34); Josh Davey 3/28 (4 overs)		Michael Leask 42 (16); James Tredwell 4/41 (4 overs)

England won by 39 runs (D/L method)
Mannofield Park, Aberdeen
Umpires: Mark Hawthorne (Ire) and Ian Ramage (Sco)
Player of the match: Michael Leask (Sco)

- Scotland won the toss and elected to field.
- The start of the match was delayed by rain until 16:00, reducing the match to 23 overs per side. Further rain during the England innings reduced the match to 20 overs per side.
- Harry Gurney (Eng) made his ODI debut.
