= Dylan Budge =

Scottish cricketer (born 1995)

Personal information
- Full name: Dylan Evers Budge
- Born: 11 September 1995 (age 31); Leeds, West Yorkshire, England
- Batting: Right-handed
- Bowling: Right-arm medium
- Role: Allrounder

International information
- National side: Scotland (2018–2022)
- ODI debut (cap 67): 10 June 2018 v England
- Last ODI: 3 June 2022 v UAE
- T20I debut (cap 45): 12 June 2018 v Pakistan
- Last T20I: 7 November 2021 v Pakistan

Career statistics
Competition	ODI	T20I
Matches	17	8
Runs scored	248	60
Batting average	22.54	15.00
100s/50s	0/0	0/0
Top score	46*	24
Balls bowled	150	6
Wickets	1	1
Bowling average	111.00	18.00
5 wickets in innings	0	0
10 wickets in match	0	0
Best bowling	1/21	1/18
Catches/stumpings	8/–	4/–
- Source: Cricinfo, 19 April 2025

Dylan Evers Budge (born 11 September 1995) is a Scottish cricketer. He made his One Day International (ODI) debut for Scotland against England on 10 June 2018. He made his Twenty20 International (T20I) debut for Scotland against Pakistan on 12 June 2018.

In June 2019, he was selected to represent Scotland A in their tour to Ireland to play the Ireland Wolves. In July 2019, he was selected to play for the Edinburgh Rocks in the inaugural edition of the Euro T20 Slam cricket tournament. However, the following month the tournament was cancelled.

In October 2019, he was added to Scotland's squad ahead of the playoff matches in the 2019 ICC T20 World Cup Qualifier tournament in the United Arab Emirates, replacing Ollie Hairs, who was ruled out due to an injury. In September 2021, Budge was named in Scotland's provisional squad for the 2021 ICC Men's T20 World Cup.

Preceded by Tom Kohler-Cadmore	Young Wisden Schools Cricketer of the Year; 2015	Succeeded by Ben Waring
