= ICC Awards of the Decade =

International cricket decadal awards

- Date: 27 December 2020
- Presented by: ICC

Highlights
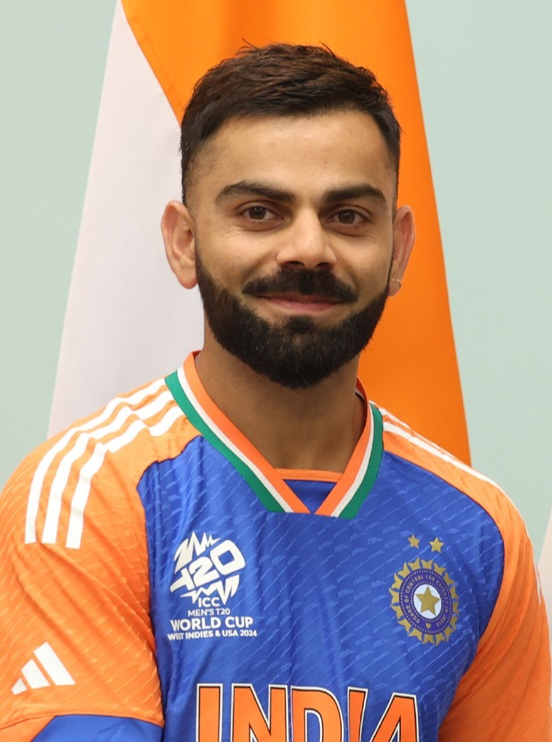
- Male Cricketer of the Decade: (India) Virat Kohli

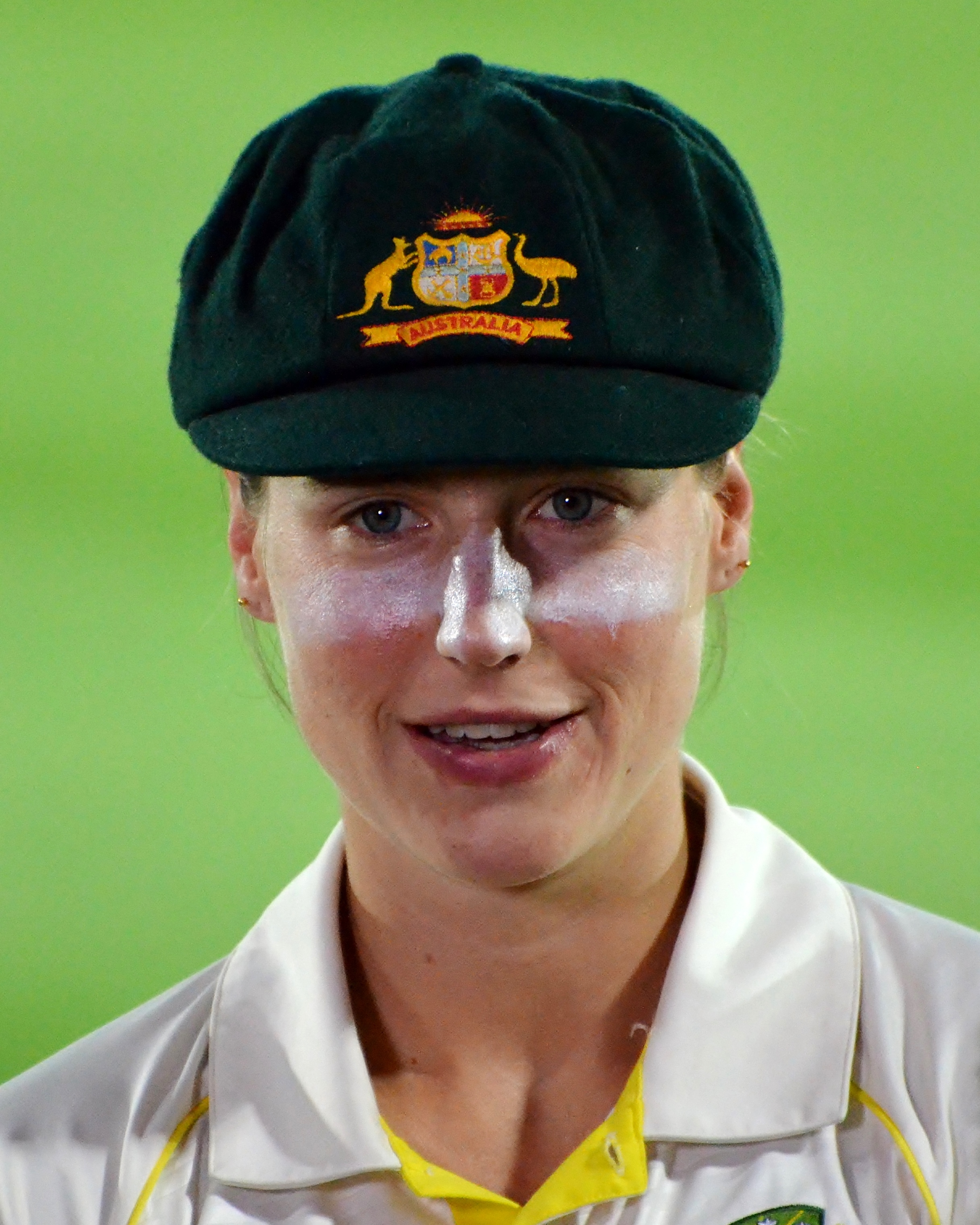
- Female Cricketer of the Decade: (Australia) Ellyse Perry
- Website: www.icc-cricket.com

The ICC Awards of the Decade was a one-off edition of the ICC Awards annual awards programme, celebrating the stand-out performers and moments from a ten-year period of international cricket. The announcement of the ICC World XI teams, along with the winners of the individual ICC awards, was made on 27 December 2020. Virat Kohli won Men's Cricketer of the Decade while Ellyse Perry was named as Women's Cricketer of the Decade.

== Award categories and winners ==
=== Individual awards ===
ICC Men's Cricketer of the Decade (Sir Garfield Sobers Award)

(India) Virat Kohli

ICC Women's Cricketer of the Decade (Rachael Heyhoe-Flint Award)

(Australia) Ellyse Perry

ICC Men's Test Cricketer of the Decade

(Australia) Steve Smith

ICC Men's ODI Cricketer of the Decade

(India) Virat Kohli

ICC Women's ODI Cricketer of the Decade

(Australia) Ellyse Perry

ICC Men's T20I Cricketer of the Decade

(Afghanistan) Rashid Khan

ICC Women’s T20I Cricketer of the Decade

(Australia) Ellyse Perry

ICC Men's Associate Cricketer of the Decade

(Scotland) Kyle Coetzer

ICC Women's Associate Cricketer of the Decade

(Scotland) Kathryn Bryce

ICC Spirit of Cricket Award of the Decade

(India) MS Dhoni

=== ICC Teams of the Decade ===
==== Men's teams ====
ICC Men's Test Team of the Decade

Test Team of the year

Test Team of the Decade
Batting position	Player	Team	Role
Opener	Alastair Cook	England	Batsman
Opener	David Warner	Australia	Batsman
Number 3	Kane Williamson	New Zealand	Batsman
Number 4	Virat Kohli	India	Batsman / Captain
Number 5	Steve Smith	Australia	Batsman
Number 6	Kumar Sangakkara	Sri Lanka	Batsman / (wk)
Number 7	Ben Stokes	England	All-rounder
Number 8	Ravichandran Ashwin	India	All-rounder
Number 9	Dale Steyn	South Africa	Bowler
Number 10	Stuart Broad	England	Bowler
Number 11	James Anderson	England	Bowler

ICC Men's ODI Team of the Decade

ODI Team of the year

ODI Team of the Decade
Batting position	Player	Team	Role
Opener	Rohit Sharma	India	Batsman
Opener	David Warner	Australia	Batsman
Number 3	Virat Kohli	India	Batsman
Number 4	AB de Villiers	South Africa	Batsman
Number 5	Shakib Al Hasan	Bangladesh	All-rounder
Number 6	MS Dhoni	India	Batsman / Captain(wk)
Number 7	Ben Stokes	England	All-rounder
Number 8	Mitchell Starc	Australia	All-rounder
Number 9	Trent Boult	New Zealand	Bowler
Number 10	Imran Tahir	South Africa	Bowler
Number 11	Lasith Malinga	Sri Lanka	Bowler

ICC Men's T20I Team of the Decade

T20I Team of the Year

T20I Team of the Decade
Batting position	Player	Team	Role
Opener	Rohit Sharma	India	Batsman
Opener	Chris Gayle	West Indies	Batsman
Number 3	Aaron Finch	Australia	Batsman
Number 4	Virat Kohli	India	Batsman
Number 5	AB de Villiers	South Africa	Batsman
Number 6	Glenn Maxwell	Australia	All-rounder
Number 7	MS Dhoni	India	Batsman / captain (wk)
Number 8	Kieron Pollard	West Indies	All-rounder
Number 9	Rashid Khan	Afghanistan	Bowler
Number 10	Jasprit Bumrah	India	Bowler
Number 11	Lasith Malinga	Sri Lanka	Bowler

==== Women's teams ====
ICC Women's ODI Team of the Decade

ODI team of the year

ODI Team of the Decade
Batting position	Player	Team	Role
Opener	Alyssa Healy	Australia	Batsman
Opener	Suzie Bates	New Zealand	Batsman
Number 3	Mithali Raj	India	Batsman
Number 4	Meg Lanning	Australia	Batsman / Captain
Number 5	Stafanie Taylor	West Indies	All-rounder
Number 6	Sarah Taylor	England	Batsman / (wk)
Number 7	Ellyse Perry	Australia	All-rounder
Number 8	Dane van Niekerk	South Africa	Bowler
Number 9	Marizanne Kapp	South Africa	Bowler
Number 10	Jhulan Goswami	India	Bowler
Number 11	Anisa Mohammed	West Indies	Bowler

ICC Women's T20I Team of the Decade

t20i team of the year

T20I Team of the Decade
Batting position	Player	Team	Role
Opener	Alyssa Healy	Australia	Batsman / (wk)
Opener	Sophie Devine	New Zealand	Batsman
Number 3	Suzie Bates	New Zealand	Batsman
Number 4	Meg Lanning	Australia	Batsman / Captain
Number 5	Harmanpreet Kaur	India	All-rounder
Number 6	Stafanie Taylor	West Indies	All-rounder
Number 7	Deandra Dottin	West Indies	Batsman
Number 8	Ellyse Perry	Australia	All-rounder
Number 9	Anya Shrubsole	England	Bowler
Number 10	Megan Schutt	Australia	Bowler
Number 11	Poonam Yadav	India	Bowler

== Criteria ==
The criteria for nomination for the ICC Player of the Decade award are designed to recognize sustained excellence and significant impact in international cricket over a ten-year period. To be eligible for nomination, a cricketer preferably should have achieved one of the following milestones: winning at least one ICC trophy, including the Cricket World Cup, ICC Test Championship Mace, ICC Men's T20 World Cup, or ICC Champions Trophy. Alternatively, the nominee can qualify by being named the ICC Player of the Tournament in any of these competitions at least once. These criteria, though not absolutely necessary to qualify, highlight both team success and individual brilliance, ensuring that the nominees have not only contributed to their teams' achievements on the world stage but have also exhibited outstanding personal performances in major international tournaments.

== Nominations ==
The following were the nominations and winners for the ICC Awards of the Decade:

=== ICC Men’s Cricketer of the Decade ===
- (India) Virat Kohli – Winner
- (India) Ravichandran Ashwin
- (England) Joe Root
- (Sri Lanka) Kumar Sangakkara
- (Australia) Steve Smith
- (South Africa) AB de Villiers
- (New Zealand) Kane Williamson

(Out of these only Kumar Sangakarra was retired at the time of nomination)

=== ICC Women’s Cricketer of the Decade ===
- (New Zealand) Suzie Bates
- (Australia) Meg Lanning
- (Australia) Ellyse Perry - Winner
- (India) Mithali Raj
- (England) Sarah Taylor
- (Cricket West Indies) Stafanie Taylor

=== ICC Men's Test Cricketer of the Decade ===
- (England) James Anderson
- (India) Virat Kohli
- (Sri Lanka) Rangana Herath
- (Australia) Steve Smith - Winner
- (Pakistan) Yasir Shah
- (England) Joe Root
- (New Zealand) Kane Williamson

=== ICC Men’s ODI Cricketer of the Decade ===
- (India) Virat Kohli - Winner
- (Sri Lanka) Lasith Malinga
- (Sri Lanka) Kumar Sangakkara
- (India) Rohit Sharma
- (Australia) Mitchell Starc
- (South Africa) AB de Villiers

=== ICC Women’s ODI Cricketer of the Decade ===
- (New Zealand) Suzie Bates
- (Australia) Meg Lanning
- (Australia) Ellyse Perry - Winner
- (India) Mithali Raj
- (Cricket West Indies) Stafanie Taylor

=== ICC Men's T20I Cricketer of the Decade ===
- (Australia) Aaron Finch
- (India) Virat Kohli
- (Cricket West Indies) Chris Gayle
- (Afghanistan) Rashid Khan - Winner
- (Sri Lanka) Lasith Malinga
- (India) Rohit Sharma
- (South Africa) Imran Tahir

=== ICC Women’s T20I Cricketer of the Decade ===
- (New Zealand) Sophie Devine
- (Cricket West Indies) Deandra Dottin
- (Australia) Ellyse Perry - Winner
- (Australia) Meg Lanning
- (England) Anya Shrubsole
- (Australia) Alyssa Healy

=== ICC Men's Associate Cricketer of the Decade ===
- (Scotland) Richie Berrington
- (Netherlands) Peter Borren
- (Scotland) Kyle Coetzer - Winner
- (Nepal) Paras Khadka
- (Scotland) Calum MacLeod
- (Papua New Guinea) Assad Vala

=== ICC Women's Associate Cricketer of the Decade ===
- (Scotland) Kathryn Bryce - Winner
- (Scotland) Sarah Bryce
- (Thailand) Natthakan Chantam
- (Netherlands) Sterre Kalis
- (Thailand) Chanida Sutthiruang
- (Thailand) Sornnorin Tippoch

=== ICC Spirit of Cricket Award of the Decade ===
- (India) MS Dhoni (2011 Winner) - Winner
- (New Zealand) Daniel Vettori (2012 Winner)
- (Sri Lanka) Mahela Jayawardene (2013 Winner)
- (England) Katherine Brunt (2014 Winner)
- (New Zealand) Brendon McCullum (2015 Winner)
- (Pakistan) Misbah-ul-Haq (2016 Winner)
- (England) Anya Shrubsole (2017 Winner)
- (New Zealand) Kane Williamson (2018 Winner)
- (India) Virat Kohli (2019 Winner)

== See also ==
- International Cricket Council
- ICC Awards
- Sir Garfield Sobers Trophy (Cricketer of the Year)
- ICC Test Player of the Year
- ICC ODI Player of the Year
- David Shepherd Trophy (Umpire of the Year)
- ICC Women's Cricketer of the Year
- ICC Test Team of the Year
- ICC ODI Team of the Year
