= Scott Cameron (cricketer) =

Scottish cricketer

Personal information
- Full name: Scott James Cameron
- Born: 24 September 1996 (age 30); Dundee, Scotland
- Batting: Right-handed
- Bowling: Right-arm medium-fast

International information
- National side: Scotland
- ODI debut (cap 66): 18 January 2018 v Ireland
- Last ODI: 23 January 2018 v UAE

Career statistics
Competition	ODI	LA	T20
Matches	2	5	3
Runs scored	9	37	19
Batting average	9.00	12.33	9.50
100s/50s	0/0	0/0	0/0
Top score	8*	21	14
Balls bowled	109	247	58
Wickets	3	6	1
Bowling average	41.00	36.33	63.00
5 wickets in innings	0	0	0
10 wickets in match	0	0	0
Best bowling	2/64	2/29	1/26
Catches/stumpings	1/–	1/–	0/–
- Source: Cricinfo, 20 October 2019

Scott James Cameron (born 24 September 1996) is a Scottish cricketer. He made his One Day International (ODI) debut for Scotland against Ireland in the 2017–18 United Arab Emirates Tri-Nation Series on 18 January 2018. Prior to his ODI debut, he was named in Scotland's squad for the 2016 Under-19 Cricket World Cup, but he injured his back before the start of the tournament.

In June 2019, he was selected to represent Scotland A in their tour to Ireland to play the Ireland Wolves. He made his Twenty20 debut for Scotland A against the Ireland Wolves on 9 June 2019. In July 2019, he was selected to play for the Glasgow Giants in the inaugural edition of the Euro T20 Slam cricket tournament. However, the following month the tournament was cancelled.
