= Harry Gurney =

English cricketer

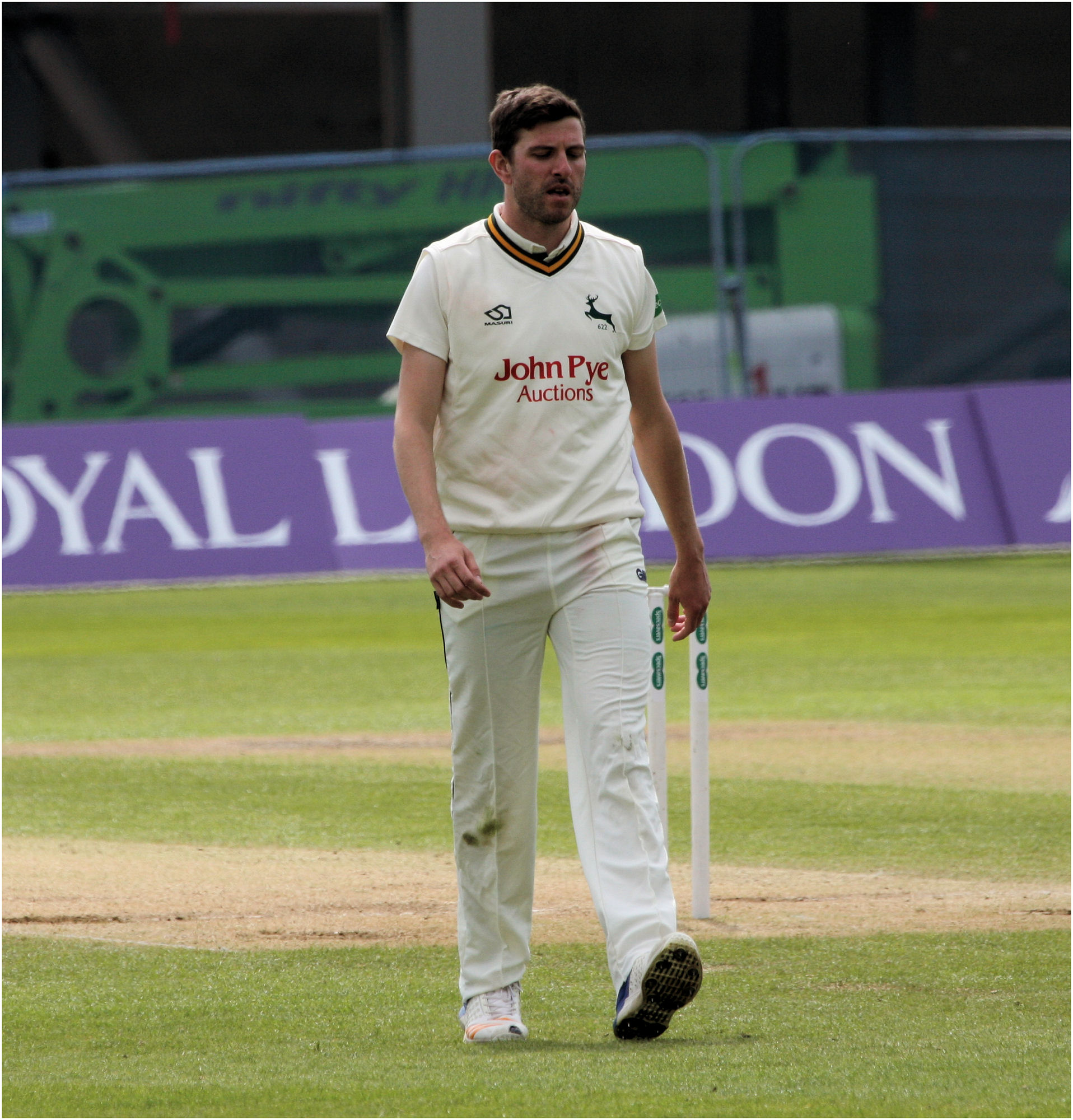
- Gurney in 2018

Personal information
- Full name: Harry Frederick Gurney
- Born: 25 October 1986 (age 40); Nottingham, Nottinghamshire, England
- Batting: Right-handed
- Bowling: Left-arm fast-medium

International information
- National side: England (2014)
- ODI debut (cap 235): 9 May 2014 v Scotland
- Last ODI: 16 December 2014 v Sri Lanka
- T20I debut (cap 69): 20 May 2014 v Sri Lanka
- Last T20I: 7 September 2014 v India

Domestic team information
- Years: Team
- 2007–2011: Leicestershire
- 2012–2019: Nottinghamshire
- 2018/19: Melbourne Renegades
- 2019: Quetta Gladiators
- 2019: Kolkata Knight Riders
- 2019: Barbados Tridents

Career statistics
Competition	ODI	T20I	FC	LA
Matches	10	2	103	93
Runs scored	15	–	424	61
Batting average	7.50	–	6.23	5.54
100s/50s	0/0	–/–	0/0	0/0
Top score	6*	–	42*	13*
Balls bowled	455	48	16,909	3,934
Wickets	11	3	310	114
Bowling average	39.27	18.33	30.55	33.94
5 wickets in innings	0	0	8	3
10 wickets in match	0	0	0	0
Best bowling	4/55	2/26	6/25	5/24
Catches/stumpings	1/–	0/–	12/–	7/–
- Source: ESPNcricinfo, 30 September 2019

Harry Frederick Gurney (born 25 October 1986) is an English former cricketer who played at international level for the England team. Gurney made his One Day International debut on 9 May 2014 against Scotland. Domestically, he played for Nottinghamshire County Cricket Club after leaving Leicestershire County Cricket Club at the end of the 2011 season. He primarily played as a left-arm seamer.

Gurney attended Garendon High School and Loughborough Grammar School, before studying at the University of Leeds.

== Leicestershire ==
Gurney had relative success in Leicestershire's second team and made his first team debut in the 2007 season.

Gurney has also played for Loughborough Town CC and the Leeds/Bradford UCCE, for which he took the wicket of ex-England Test Captain Michael Vaughan.

In 2009, Gurney shone in T20, taking 8 wickets at an average of 23. However, he struggled to make an impact in the longer form of the game, averaging over 50 in the second division of the County Championship. The following year, Gurney's Twenty20 form dipped, although he improved in the Championship, averaging just over 33.

In 2011, Gurney proved adept particularly in Twenty20 matches, taking 23 wickets during Leicestershire's title winning campaign, although he missed out on Finals Day due to injury. He was though, part of the Foxes squad in the 2011 Champions League Twenty20 which took place in India. He took 5 wickets in the tournament although Leicester lost both their games in the competition.

== Nottinghamshire ==
In 2012, Gurney left Leicestershire to join Nottinghamshire, following the same path as Stuart Broad and James Taylor. Although he was seen as a one-day specialist, Gurney also featured in the County Championship Division One for the first time in his career. Notts failed to win a trophy but Gurney established himself as an integral part of the team, particularly in the shorter formats of the game.

In 2013, Gurney was Nottinghamshire's leading wicket taker. As well as taking a hat trick in the County Championship, Gurney performed well in the Yorkshire Bank 40 competition, which Nottinghamshire eventually went on to win. Comparisons were made with former Nottinghamshire bowler Ryan Sidebottom, as both are left armed and rely on getting the ball to swing.

== International career ==
Following Gurney's good form for Nottinghamshire, he was called up to the England team for the limited overs tour of the West Indies in 2014. He did not play, but retained his place in the squad for the ODI against Scotland. He did not take a wicket on ODI debut in what proved to be a rain affected match. He was selected to make his T20I debut in a match against Sri Lanka, taking figures of 2/26, although England went on to lose the match. In the subsequent ODI series with Sri Lanka, he featured in all five matches taking nine wickets including his career best 4/55 in the fourth ODI at Lord's.

Gurney was selected in the limited overs squad against India, although he only appeared in the fourth match of the series, taking figures of 1/51. He played in the only T20 match between the teams, taking 1/29 to help England win the game.

Gurney was retained on the limited overs tour of Sri Lanka and played in three ODIs taking one wicket. He was omitted from the squad for the Triangular Series in Australia which acted as warm-up for the 2015 World Cup.

== T20 franchise career ==
In November 2018, Gurney was signed by the Melbourne Renegades as a replacement for Usman Khan Shinwari. He was drafted by Quetta Gladiators for PSL 2019. He also played for Northern Warriors in 2018 Abu Dhabi T10. In December 2018, he was bought by the Kolkata Knight Riders in the player auction for the 2019 Indian Premier League. On 7 April 2019, he made his IPL debut against Rajasthan Royals. He registered bowling figures of 2/25 in 4 overs and was awarded the man of the match award.

In July 2019, Gurney was selected to play for the Dublin Chiefs in the inaugural edition of the Euro T20 Slam cricket tournament. However, the following month, the tournament was cancelled. In July 2020, he was named in the Barbados Tridents squad for the 2020 Caribbean Premier League.

In September 2020, Gurney underwent a shoulder surgery. As he result, he was ruled out of the 2020 Indian Premier League and 2020 t20 Blast. He was later replaced by Ali Khan in the Kolkata Knight Riders squad.

Gurney was released by the Kolkata Knight Riders ahead of the 2021 IPL auction.

== Retirement ==
Gurney announced his retirement from cricket in May 2021 following his shoulder injury. He is co-owner of a country pub on the Nottinghamshire and Leicestershire boundary, along with Stuart Broad. Named Tap and Run, in June 2022 it suffered total loss through fire caused by electrical drying of hotel linen overnight, leaving only the shell. Following a full rebuild costing £1.3 million, it reopened in 2023 and was described by the owners as their "second innings".
