= Daniel Doram =

Sint Maarten/Dutch cricketer

Personal information
- Full name: Daniel Tarric Doram
- Born: 30 October 1997 (age 29); Sint Maarten
- Height: 2.01 m (6 ft 7 in)
- Batting: Left-handed
- Bowling: Slow left-arm orthodox
- Role: Bowler

International information
- National side: Netherlands (2013–present)
- ODI debut (cap 89): 8 June 2026 v United States
- Last ODI: 16 June 2026 v Netherlands
- T20I debut (cap 61): 18 May 2024 v Scotland
- Last T20I: 3 September 2025 v Bangladesh

Domestic team information
- Years: Team
- 2018–present: Leeward Islands

Career statistics
Competition	ODI	T20I	FC	LA
Matches	2	14	16	24
Runs scored	–	4	229	46
Batting average	–	–	15.26	4.60
100s/50s	–/–	0/0	0/0	0/0
Top score	–	2*	43	14
Balls bowled	48	294	2,593	965
Wickets	0	14	47	24
Bowling average	–	26.35	27.06	26.50
5 wickets in innings	–	0	2	1
10 wickets in match	–	0	1	0
Best bowling	–	3/14	6/34	7/29
Catches/stumpings	0/–	4/–	15/–	6/–
- Source: ESPNcricinfo, 18 July 2026

Daniel Tarric Doram (born 30 October 1997) is a Sint Maarten cricketer. He plays for the Leeward Islands cricket team in West Indian domestic cricket and has also played international cricket for the Netherlands national cricket team. He is a left-arm orthodox bowler who stands 6 feet 7 inches (2.01 m) tall.

== Netherlands ==
Doram made his first-class debut for the Netherlands in July 2013, aged only 15. Playing against Ireland in an Intercontinental Cup fixture, he took 5/82 in the first innings, becoming one of the youngest players to take a first-class five-wicket haul (and also the first Sint Maartener). A few months later, Doram also made his List A debut, playing against Northamptonshire in the 2013 Yorkshire Bank 40 (an English competition). After that, he was not recalled to the Dutch team until June 2015, when he featured in an Intercontinental Cup fixture against Papua New Guinea.

In 2023, Doram was selected in the Netherlands A squad for a tri-series against Austria and Germany. In February 2024, he was named as a reserve in the Dutch senior squad for its T20I tri-nation series in Nepal. In May 2024, he was named in national team for the 2024 Netherlands T20I Tri-Nation Series. He made his Twenty20 International (T20I) debut against Scotland in that tournament, on 18 May 2024.

In May 2024, he was named in the Netherlands squad for the 2024 ICC Men's T20 World Cup tournament.

== England ==
Doram attended school in England, at Hurstpierpoint College, West Sussex, having earlier attended St. Maarten Academy. He was inducted into the Sussex County Cricket Club's academy in 2015, and has played for Sussex in the Second XI Championship. In 2018 he became the overseas professional at Crook Town CC in the Durham Cricket League helping them to win promotion to the North East Premier League. He returned to the club for their inaugural NEPL season in 2019 and during the season was selected for the NEPL Representative XI which played MCC. In his two seasons with Crook he scored 1741 runs at an average of 40.49 with 2 centuries and took 102 wickets at an average of 26.94 with 3 times claiming 5 wickets in an innings. Prior to COVID-19 he had agreed to play for Torquay CC in the Devon Cricket League for the 2020 season.

== West Indies ==
Doram made his senior debut for Leeward Islands in December 2018 against Barbados in the 2018–19 Regional Four Day Competition. After a gap of three years, he returned to first-class cricket in February 2022 in the 2021–22 West Indies Championship, taking 3/16 against Guyana.

In October 2023, Doram took figures of 7/29 from 9.5 overs against Jamaica in the 2023–24 Super50 Cup, the third-best bowling figures in the history of West Indian domestic one-day cricket.
