= David Sole =

British Lions & Scotland international rugby union player

David Sole OBE
- Born: 8 May 1962 (age 64) Aylesbury, Buckinghamshire, England
- Height: 1.80 m (5 ft 11 in)
- Weight: 103 kg (16 st 3 lb)
- School: Glenalmond College

Rugby union career
- Position: Loosehead Prop
Amateur team(s)
Years	Team	Apps	(Points)
- Exeter University
1983–87	Bath		
1987–92	Edinburgh Academicals		
Provincial / State sides
Years	Team	Apps	(Points)
- Anglo-Scots
- Edinburgh District
International career
Years	Team	Apps	(Points)
1983-85	Scotland 'B'	5	(0)
1986–1992	Scotland	44	(12)
1989	British and Irish Lions	3	(0)
1992	World XV		
Coaching career
- Years: Team
- Edinburgh Academicals

David Michael Barclay Sole OBE (born 8 May 1962) is a former Scotland international rugby union player.

He was appointed Officer of the Order of the British Empire (OBE) in the 1993 New Year Honours.

== Rugby Union career ==
=== Amateur career ===
He was educated at Blairmore prep school and Glenalmond College, a private school in Perthshire.

He went to Exeter University and played for their rugby side.

He played for Bath and then moved to play for Edinburgh Academicals.

=== Provincial career ===
He played for Scottish Exiles (then Anglo-Scots) in the Scottish Inter-District Championship.

When he moved to play for Edinburgh Academicals, he then turned out for Edinburgh District.

=== International career ===
While still with Exeter University rugby club he was capped by Scotland 'B'. He received 5 'B' caps in total.

He made his full senior Scotland debut in 1986 against France and went on to win 44 caps at prop between 1986 and 1992, with a record 25 as captain. He was also the first choice loosehead prop with the victorious British Lions in Australia in 1989.

In 1990, Sole was captain for a Grand Slam decider at Murrayfield against hot favourites England. This is sometimes considered to be Scotland's greatest match, and one well remembered, as Richard Bath wrote:

"David Sole is another of those players who is remembered and virtually defined by one moment: in this case it was when he made the decision for his side to take the now famous walk onto the pitch for the Grand Slam decider against England at Murrayfield in 1990. As a statement of resolve, it was a masterstroke from which the English never recovered as they lost the most high-profile game in Five Nations Rugby history. It also cemented Sole's name in Scottish folklore...

"[David Sole was] one of the game's most softly-spoken and considered men off the field and one of the most inspirational and thoughtful captains and players on it."

Scotland won 13-7, denying England the Grand Slam and claiming their third Grand Slam after their previous triumphs in 1925 and 1984.

He captained a World XV to a victory against the All Blacks in 1992. He made his final international appearance for Scotland in 1992 against Australia. That year he stood for election as Rector of the University of Dundee, but despite being the favourite candidate he was defeated by Stephen Fry.

== Media career ==
Since retiring Sole has worked as a co-commentator for BBC Scotland's coverage of rugby union matches.

== Business career ==
He has also embarked on a successful career outside of sport, becoming Managing Partner of "School for CEOs'" in 2017 as well as Non-executive director of AM Bid Services.

== Family ==
Three of Sole's four children have also represented their country in international sport. His sons Chris and Tom both play for the Scotland cricket team, while his daughter Gemma plays for the Scotland netball team. His other son Jamie is also a rugby player, and played professionally with Newcastle Falcons.
