= Amir Hayat =

Emirati cricketer (born 1982)

Personal information
- Full name: Amir Hayat
- Born: 28 August 1982 (age 44); Lahore, Pakistan
- Batting: Right-handed
- Bowling: Right-arm medium
- Role: Bowler

International information
- National side: United Arab Emirates
- ODI debut (cap 74): 23 January 2018 v Scotland
- Last ODI: 28 January 2019 v Nepal
- T20I debut (cap 40): 22 October 2018 v Australia
- Last T20I: 3 February 2019 v Nepal

Career statistics
Competition	ODI	T20I	FC	LA
Matches	9	4	1	16
Runs scored	31	3	0	38
Batting average	10.33	1.50	0.00	7.60
100s/50s	0/0	0/0	0/0	0/0
Top score	24*	3	0	24*
Balls bowled	449	84	132	787
Wickets	11	6	0	23
Bowling average	34.72	17.16	–	26.60
5 wickets in innings	0	0	–	0
10 wickets in match	0	0	–	0
Best bowling	3/19	2/16	–	4/53
Catches/stumpings	4/–	0/–	1/–	7/–
- Source: ESPNCricinfo, 12 June 2019

Amir Hayat (born 28 August 1982) is a Pakistani-born cricketer who played for the United Arab Emirates national cricket team. He made his first-class debut for the United Arab Emirates against Afghanistan in the 2015–17 ICC Intercontinental Cup on 29 November 2017. He made his List A debut against Nepal in the 2015–17 ICC World Cricket League Championship on 6 December 2017.

In January 2018, he was named in the UAE One Day International (ODI) squad for a tri-series against Ireland and Scotland. He made his ODI debut against Scotland on 23 January 2018. Later the same month, he was named in the UAE squad for the 2018 ICC World Cricket League Division Two tournament.

In August 2018, he was included in the UAE squad for the 2018 Asia Cup Qualifier tournament.

He made his Twenty20 International (T20I) debut for the UAE in a one-off match against Australia on 22 October 2018. In December 2018, he was named in the UAE team for the 2018 ACC Emerging Teams Asia Cup.

In September 2020, Hayat, along with fellow UAE player Ashfaq Ahmed, was charged under the International Cricket Council's (ICC) anti-corruption rules, and was suspended from cricket with immediate effect. In July 2021, the ICC banned both Hayat and Ashfaq Ahmed from all cricket for eight years, backdated to 13 September 2020.
