= Gavin Main =

Scottish cricketer

Personal information
- Full name: Gavin Thomas Main
- Born: 28 February 1995 (age 31); Lanark, Scotland
- Batting: Right-handed
- Bowling: Right-arm fast
- Role: Bowler

International information
- National side: Scotland (2015–2024)
- ODI debut (cap 70): 17 August 2019 v PNG
- Last ODI: 26 July 2024 v Namibia
- T20I debut (cap 42): 19 June 2015 v Ireland
- Last T20I: 22 May 2024 v Netherlands

Domestic team information
- Years: Team
- 2014–2019: Durham (squad no. 20)

Career statistics
Competition	ODI	T20I	FC	LA
Matches	16	16	4	18
Runs scored	82	12	13	82
Batting average	82.00	12.00	6.50	82.00
100s/50s	0/1	0/0	0/0	0/1
Top score	64*	12*	13	64*
Balls bowled	716	242	402	818
Wickets	34	19	8	38
Bowling average	18.11	18.00	39.87	18.15
5 wickets in innings	1	1	0	1
10 wickets in match	0	0	0	0
Best bowling	5/52	5/26	3/72	5/52
Catches/stumpings	8/–	3/–	1/–	8/–
- Source: Cricinfo, 5 August 2024

Gavin Thomas Main (born 28 February 1995) is a Scottish cricketer. He made his first class debut for Durham County Cricket Club on 25 May 2014.

He made his Twenty20 International debut against Ireland on 19 June 2015, although no play was possible due to rain. He made his List A debut in the 2015–17 ICC World Cricket League Championship on 29 July 2015 against Nepal.

In May 2019, he was named in Scotland's One Day International (ODI) squad for their series against Afghanistan, but he did not play. The following month, he was selected to represent Scotland A in their tour to Ireland to play the Ireland Wolves. In July 2019, he was selected to play for the Edinburgh Rocks in the inaugural edition of the Euro T20 Slam cricket tournament. However, the following month the tournament was cancelled.

In July 2019, he was named in Scotland's One Day International (ODI) squad for the 2019 Scotland Tri-Nation Series. He made his ODI debut for Scotland, against Papua New Guinea, on 17 August 2019.

On 13 April 2022, in the fourth match of the 2022 Papua New Guinea Tri-Nation Series, Main took his first five-wicket haul in ODI cricket, with 5/52.
