= Tom Sole =

Scottish cricketer

Personal information
- Full name: Thomas Barclay Sole
- Born: 12 June 1996 (age 30); Edinburgh, Scotland
- Batting: Right-handed
- Bowling: Right-arm off break
- Role: All-rounder
- Relatives: David Sole (father); Chris Sole (brother)

International information
- National side: Scotland
- ODI debut (cap 65): 16 January 2018 v Ireland
- Last ODI: 20 August 2019 v PNG
- T20I debut (cap 51): 19 September 2019 v Netherlands
- Last T20I: 31 October 2019 v Oman

Domestic team information
- Years: Team
- 2017–2020: Northamptonshire (squad no. 90)

Career statistics
Competition	ODI	T20I	LA	T20
Matches	10	9	15	19
Runs scored	46	69	130	160
Batting average	7.66	17.25	13.00	20.00
100s/50s	0/0	0/0	0/1	0/0
Top score	20	33*	54	41*
Balls bowled	504	126	708	174
Wickets	10	6	14	6
Bowling average	38.70	22.83	41.35	33.00
5 wickets in innings	0	0	0	0
10 wickets in match	0	0	0	0
Best bowling	4/15	2/15	4/15	2/15
Catches/stumpings	7/–	5/–	8/–	16/–
- Source: ESPNcricinfo, 20 September 2020

Thomas Barclay Sole (born 12 June 1996) is a Scottish cricketer. He made his List A debut for Northamptonshire against the South Africans team on 21 May 2017, during South Africa's tour of England. He made his One Day International (ODI) debut for Scotland against Ireland in the 2017–18 United Arab Emirates Tri-Nation Series.

In March 2018, during the 2018 Cricket World Cup Qualifier match against Hong Kong at the Bulawayo Athletic Club, Bulawayo, Sole took four wickets for fifteen runs. Scotland won the match by 4 wickets after Hong Kong were bowled out for 92 runs. Sole was named as the player of the match for his performance.

He made his Twenty20 debut for Northamptonshire in the 2018 t20 Blast on 17 August 2018. In July 2019, he was selected to play for the Glasgow Giants in the inaugural edition of the Euro T20 Slam cricket tournament. However, the following month the tournament was cancelled.

In September 2019, he was named in Scotland's squad for the 2019–20 Ireland Tri-Nation Series and the 2019 ICC T20 World Cup Qualifier tournament in the United Arab Emirates. He made his T20I debut for Scotland, against the Netherlands, on 19 September 2019. However, on 24 October 2019, the International Cricket Council (ICC) announced that his bowling action was found to be illegal. He was suspended from bowling in international cricket matches until an assessment shows that his bowling action is legal.

His father, David, played rugby union for Scotland and his brother, Chris, also plays cricket for Scotland.
