= List of Afghanistan national cricket captains =

This is a list of all cricketers who have captained Afghanistan in an official international match. This includes the ICC Trophy, Under-19 games and One Day International.

== Men's cricket ==
=== Test captains ===
This is a list of cricketers who have captained the Afghanistan cricket team for at least one Test match.

A cricketer who has a symbol of next to a Test match series describes their role as captain and their participation in at least one game for the team.

Afghanistan Test match captains
No.	Name	Year	Opposition	Location	Played	Won	Lost	Drawn
1	Asghar Afghan	2018	India	India	1	0	1	0
1	Asghar Afghan	2018–19	Ireland	India	1	1	0	0
1	Asghar Afghan	2020–21	Zimbabwe	UAE	2	1	1	0
1	Asghar Afghan	Total			4	2	2	0
2	Rashid Khan	2019–20	Bangladesh	Bangladesh	1	1	0	0
2	Rashid Khan	2019–20	West Indies	India	1	0	1	0
2	Rashid Khan	Total			2	1	1	0
3	Hashmatullah Shahidi	2023	Bangladesh	Bangladesh	1	0	1	0
3	Hashmatullah Shahidi	2023/24	Sri Lanka	Sri Lanka	1	0	1	0
3	Hashmatullah Shahidi	2023/24	Ireland	UAE	1	0	1	0
3	Hashmatullah Shahidi	Total			3	0	3	0
Grand total					9	3	6	0

=== One Day International captains ===
Afghanistan played their first ODI on April 19, 2009.The table of results is complete up to the third ODI against Sri Lanka in November 2022.

Afghanistan ODI captains
Number	Name	Year	Played	Won	Tied	Lost	No Result
1	Nawroz Mangal	2009–2012	22	12	0	10	0
2	Karim Sadiq	2012	1	0	0	1	0
3	Mohammad Nabi	2013-2015	28	13	0	15	0
4	Asghar Afghan	2015–2021	59	34	1	21	3
5	Rashid Khan	2018–2019	7	1	0	6	0
6	Gulbadin Naib	2019	12	2	0	10	0
7	Hashmatullah Shahidi	2022	12	8	0	3	1
Grand total			141	70	1	66	4

=== Twenty20 International captains ===
Afghanistan played their first T20I on February 1, 2010.The table of results is complete up to the third T20I against Pakistan in March 2023.

Afghanistan T20I Captains
Number	Name	Year	Played	Won	Tied	Lost	No Result
1	Nawroz Mangal	2010–2012	13	6	0	7	0
2	Mohammad Nabi	2013–2022	35	16	0	19	0
3	Asghar Afghan	2015–2021	52	42	1	9	0
4	Rashid Khan	2019–present	13	8	0	5	0
Total			113	72	1	40	0

=== ICC Cricket World Cup Qualifier (ICC Trophy) ===
Afghanistan debuted in the ICC Cricket World Cup Qualifier in the 2009 tournament

Afghan ICC Trophy (ICC Cricket World Cup Qualifier) Captains
Number	Name	Year	Played	Won	Tied	Lost	No Result
1	Nawroz Mangal	2009	10	6	0	4	0
2	Asghar Afghan	2018	10	5	0	5	0
Overall			20	11	-	9	-
