= Grant Dugmore =

South African-Argentine cricketer (born 1967)

Personal information
- Full name: Adrian Grant Dugmore
- Born: 1 February 1967 (age 59); Grahamstown, Cape Province, South Africa
- Batting: Right-handed
- Role: Wicket-keeper

International information
- National side: Argentina

Domestic team information
- Years: Team
- 1990/91–1991/92: Eastern Province Country Districts

Career statistics
Competition	List A
Matches	2
Runs scored	3
Batting average	1.50
100s/50s	0/0
Top score	3
Catches/stumpings	4/0
- Source: Cricinfo, 23 January 2011

Adrian Grant Dugmore (born 1 February 1967) is a South Africa-born Argentine cricketer and cricket administrator based in Argentina. Dugmore played as a right-handed batsman and a wicket-keeper.

Dugmore was born at Grahamstown, Cape Province in 1967 and began his senior cricketing career in the 1990/91 South African season, playing for Eastern Province County Districts in the Nissan Shield. He made only two official List A cricket appearances for the side.

After playing in Scotland in the mid-1990s, Dugmore played for Argentina between 2002 and 2012.

Dugmore also refereed all three matches during the Central American Championship competition of 2006, in which Belize were victorious over Mexico and Costa Rica.
