= Allan Haggo =

Scottish cricket umpire (born 1961)

Personal information
- Full name: Allan Haggo
- Born: 30 November 1961 (age 64); Irvine, North Ayrshire, Scotland
- Nickname: Aldo
- Role: Umpire

Umpiring information
- ODIs umpired: 12 (2016–2022)
- T20Is umpired: 27 (2018–2023)
- Source: Cricinfo, 24 July 2023

Allan Haggo (born 30 November 1961) is a cricket umpire from Scotland. In 2015, he was inducted into the ICC Associates and Affiliates Umpire Panel along with Ian Ramage, another Scottish umpire.

On 14 August 2016, he made his One Day International umpiring debut in a fixture between Scotland and the United Arab Emirates at The Grange Club, Edinburgh in the 2015–17 ICC World Cricket League Championship. On 12 June 2018, he stood in his first Twenty20 International (T20I) match, between Scotland and Pakistan.

He was one of the eight on-field umpires for the 2019 ICC World Cricket League Division Two tournament in Namibia. He was one of the on-field umpires for the 2022 ICC Under-19 Cricket World Cup in the West Indies.

== See also ==
- List of One Day International cricket umpires
- List of Twenty20 International cricket umpires
