= Rameez Shahzad =

Emirati cricketer

Personal information
- Born: 30 November 1987 (age 38); Lahore, Pakistan
- Batting: Right-handed
- Bowling: Right-arm off break
- Role: Batsman
- Relatives: Shahzad Altaf (father)

International information
- National side: United Arab Emirates (2016-2023)
- ODI debut (cap 66): 14 August 2016 v Scotland
- Last ODI: 9 June 2023 v West Indies
- T20I debut (cap 32): 14 December 2016 v Afghanistan
- Last T20I: 30 October 2019 v Scotland

Career statistics
Competition	ODI	T20I	FC	LA
Matches	23	22	7	33
Runs scored	862	449	315	1,054
Batting average	43.10	24.94	28.63	39.03
100s/50s	2/5	0/1	0/2	2/5
Top score	121*	54	74*	121*
Balls bowled	23	–	90	12
Wickets	0	–	0	0
Bowling average	–	–	–	–
5 wickets in innings	–	–	–	–
10 wickets in match	–	–	–	–
Best bowling	–	–	–	–
Catches/stumpings	6/–	8/–	3/–	16/–
- Source: ESPNcricinfo, 10 June 2023

Rameez Shahzad (Urdu: رمیزشہزاد; born 30 November 1987) is a professional cricketer who has represented the United Arab Emirates national cricket team since 2005. He is a right-handed middle-order batsman. He and his father Shehzad Altaf are the first father-son pair to play for the United Arab Emirates.

== Personal life ==
Rameez was born on 30 November 1987 in Lahore, Pakistan. His Pakistani parents had lived in the UAE for five years previously and returned to Sharjah when he was one month old.

His father Shehzad Altaf was a professional cricket coach and also played international cricket for the UAE in the 1990s.

Rameez moved to England to attend university and also played for Durham in the Second XI Championship during that time.

== International career ==
Rameez first represented the UAE at the Under-15 level, playing in the Under-15 Asia Cup in Dubai in December 2002. He first represented the senior team in 2005, playing in an ICC Intercontinental Cup match against Ireland in October. He played for the Under-19 team in the ACC Under-19 Cup in Nepal the following month.

He returned to the senior team to play in the 2006 ACC Trophy in Malaysia and played twice in the 2006 ICC Intercontinental Cup; against Namibia and Scotland. He represented his country in the 2008 ACC Trophy Elite tournament in Kuala Lumpur.

Rameez made his One Day International (ODI) debut against Scotland on 14 August 2016 in the 2015–17 ICC World Cricket League Championship. He made his Twenty20 International (T20I) debut for the United Arab Emirates against Afghanistan on 14 December 2016.

In January 2018, he was named in the UAE's squad for the 2018 ICC World Cricket League Division Two tournament. Following the conclusion of the 2018 Cricket World Cup Qualifier tournament, the International Cricket Council (ICC) named Rameez as the rising star of the United Arab Emirates' squad.

In August 2018, he was named in the United Arab Emirates' squad for the 2018 Asia Cup Qualifier tournament. In December 2018, he was named in the United Arab Emirates' team for the 2018 ACC Emerging Teams Asia Cup. Later the same month, he was one of three players to be given an eight-week ban from international cricket for breaching the Emirates Cricket Board's Player's Code of Conduct, after using Twitter to criticise the facilities in Karachi during the tournament. In January 2019, the Pakistan Cricket Board (PCB) had accepted apologies from all the cricketers involved. In March 2019, he returned to the UAE's squad following his suspension for their series against the United States.

In September 2019, he was named in the United Arab Emirates' squad for the 2019 ICC T20 World Cup Qualifier tournament in the UAE.

After a break of several years, during which time he moved to Europe for his career, Rameez returned to the UAE's squad in June 2023 for its ODI series against the West Indies.

== Franchise career ==
In June 2019, he was selected to play for the Winnipeg Hawks franchise team in the 2019 Global T20 Canada tournament.
