= Kyle Coetzer =

Scottish cricketer

Kyle Coetzer MBE
Personal information
- Full name: Kyle James Coetzer
- Born: 14 April 1984 (age 42); Aberdeen, Scotland
- Nickname: Lips
- Height: 5 ft 11 in (1.80 m)
- Batting: Right-handed
- Bowling: Right-arm medium-fast
- Role: Opening batsman
- Relatives: Stuart Coetzer (brother); Grant Dugmore (uncle)

International information
- National side: Scotland (2003–2023)
- ODI debut (cap 33): 18 August 2008 v England
- Last ODI: 21 February 2023 v Nepal
- T20I debut (cap 13): 2 August 2008 v Ireland
- Last T20I: 7 November 2021 v Pakistan

Domestic team information
- Years: Team
- 2004–2011: Durham
- 2011–2015: Northamptonshire (squad no. 30)
- 2012: Chittagong Kings
- 2015: Suffolk
- 2018: Northamptonshire

Career statistics
Competition	ODI	T20I	FC	LA
Matches	89	70	94	199
Runs scored	3,192	1,495	4,404	6,296
Batting average	38.92	22.65	30.37	36.39
100s/50s	5/21	0/6	8/19	11/38
Top score	156	89	219	156
Balls bowled	270	66	678	516
Wickets	2	5	7	5
Bowling average	126.50	14.20	59.14	101.60
5 wickets in innings	0	0	0	0
10 wickets in match	0	0	0	0
Best bowling	1/17	3/25	2/16	1/2
Catches/stumpings	26/–	22/–	46/–	68/–
- Source: Cricinfo, 24 March 2023

Kyle James Coetzer MBE (born 14 April 1984) is a Scottish former cricketer who has captained the Scottish youth national sides in international formats. He captained at under-15, under-17 and under-19 levels including skippering in the 2004 U-19 Cricket World Cup in Bangladesh.

Coetzer was appointed Member of the Order of the British Empire (MBE) in the 2019 Birthday Honours for services to cricket. He became the third Scottish cricketer to receive an MBE for services to cricket. In January 2020, Coetzer was named as the Associate Cricketer of the Decade by the International Cricket Council (ICC). In March 2023, Coetzer announced his retirement from all international formats.

== Domestic and T20 franchise career ==
Coetzer played six first-class matches for Durham in the 2004 season, scoring 67 on his first class debut. Later that year he scored 133* for Scotland in the ICC Inter-Continental Cup Semi Final against Kenya. His form dropped away in 2005 and 2006, but early season form in 2007 has helped him gain his Durham place back. In the 2009 Twenty20 World Cup in England, he took "the best catch ever" according to former cricketer David Lloyd in a match against South Africa. He was also Scotland's leading run scorer in the tournament. He also captains for Pokhara Rhinos in Everest Premier League.

In 2011 he joined Northamptonshire on loan, before making the move from Durham permanent. In August 2012, Coetzer signed a new two-year contract taking him through to 2014. However, after only playing four first-class games in 2015, he was released at the end of the 2015 season. He also appeared for Suffolk in the Unicorns Trophy during 2015.

In June 2019, he was selected to play for the Montreal Tigers franchise team in the 2019 Global T20 Canada tournament. In July 2019, he was selected to play for the Edinburgh Rocks in the inaugural edition of the Euro T20 Slam cricket tournament. However, the following month the tournament was cancelled.

== International career ==
His first game for the full Scotland team came in 2003 against Pakistan in a one-day match; he appeared in four National League matches later that season. He is a former captain for the Scotland ODI side.

His first ODI century came against Afghanistan in 2011–13 ICC World Cricket League Championship, where Scotland lost to Afghanistan finally. The bad luck continued in 2015 as well, where Coetzer scored a record 156 against Bangladesh in 2015 ICC Cricket World Cup in Nelson in 2015 in a losing cause.

He was selected as the captain of the Scotland T20I international for the tournament to be played in United Arab Emirates in January 2017.

Coetzer first captained Scottish ODI squad for Zimbabwe tour in June 2017. In the first match as ODI captain on 15 June 2017, Coetzer scored a century, becoming the first Scottish to do so in a debut captaincy. The century sealed the match to win by 26 runs, which is recorded as the first ever win against a Full Member as well.

In February 2018, the International Cricket Council (ICC) named Coetzer as one of the ten players to watch ahead of the 2018 Cricket World Cup Qualifier tournament.

On 10 June 2018, he captained Scotland to a six run win over England in a 50 over ODI at The Grange Club in Edinburgh, scoring 58 runs out of Scotland's total of 371 for 5.

In September 2019, he was named as the captain of Scotland's squad for the 2019 ICC T20 World Cup Qualifier tournament in the United Arab Emirates. In November 2020, Coetzer was nominated for the ICC Men's Associate Cricketer of the Decade Award. On 27 December 2020, Coetzer won the ICC Men's Associate Cricketer of the Decade Award.

In September 2021, Coetzer was named the captain of Scotland's provisional squad for the 2021 ICC Men's T20 World Cup.

Coetzer had stepped down from international captaincy on 3 June 2022. The following month, on 21 July 2022, Coetzer announced his retirement from T20Is.

== Family ==
Coetzer comes from a family of cricket players. His father, Peter, plays for Stoneywood-Dyce Cricket Club as have his brothers Shaun and Stuart. His uncle is Grant Dugmore who played for Eastern Province and Argentina.

== Awards ==
- ICC Men's Associate Cricketer of the Decade: 2011–20
- ICC Men’s Associate Cricketer of the Year: 2019
