= Stuart Whittingham =

Scottish cricketer

Personal information
- Full name: Stuart Gordon Whittingham
- Born: 10 February 1994 (age 32); Derby, Derbyshire, England
- Batting: Right-handed
- Bowling: Right-arm fast-medium

International information
- National side: Scotland (2017–2020)
- ODI debut (cap 63): 6 October 2017 v Papua New Guinea
- Last ODI: 15 December 2019 v UAE
- T20I debut (cap 47): 16 June 2018 v Ireland
- Last T20I: 19 June 2018 v Netherlands

Domestic team information
- Years: Team
- 2012–2015: Loughborough MCCU
- 2016–2018: Sussex (squad no. 29)
- 2019–2020: Gloucestershire (squad no. 19)

Career statistics
Competition	ODI	T20I	FC	LA
Matches	5	3	15	6
Runs scored	7	–	68	7
Batting average	3.50	–	6.80	3.50
100s/50s	0/0	–	0/0	0/0
Top score	3*	–	22	3*
Balls bowled	251	60	1,993	311
Wickets	8	3	46	11
Bowling average	28.00	26.33	30.19	23.54
5 wickets in innings	0	0	2	0
10 wickets in match	0	0	0	0
Best bowling	3/58	2/33	5/70	3/35
Catches/stumpings	3/–	0/–	3/–	3/–
- Source: ESPNcricinfo, 2 January 2020

Stuart Gordon Whittingham (born 10 February 1994) is a Scottish former cricketer who played for Gloucestershire County Cricket Club as well as representing his country in One Day Internationals. Whittingham has also represented Loughborough MCC University, Sussex and the Scotland Under-19 cricket team. Primarily a right-arm fast-medium bowler, he also bats right handed. However, in September 2020, Whittingham was forced to retire from cricket due to a back injury.

== Education ==
Whittingham was educated at Christ's Hospital School, a boarding independent school near the market town of Horsham in West Sussex, followed by Loughborough University.

== Career ==
Whittingham's first recorded match is for the Sussex U-13 team in June 2007. Other Sussex cricket teams he has also represented are Sussex U-15s and U-17s, the Sussex Academy, and the Sussex Second XI; Whittingham has also played non first class matches for Roffey Cricket Club and Loughborough MCC University Whittingham made two appearances for Scotland U-19s in 2013/14, in warmup matches for the 2014 Under-19 Cricket World Cup, and was named in the squad for the tournament. Whittingham made his first-class cricket debut for Loughborough MCC University against Hampshire in April 2015 returning bowling figures of 1/77 and 0/32. Whittingham was awarded a junior professional contract for Sussex for the 2016 English cricket season. He made his first appearance for Sussex in a County Championship match against Derbyshire, taking figures of 2/38. He dismissed Hamish Rutherford and Neil Broom, and also hit Billy Godleman on the helmet.

He made his One Day International debut for Scotland against Papua New Guinea in the 2015–17 ICC World Cricket League Championship on 6 October 2017. He made his Twenty20 International (T20I) debut for Scotland against Ireland on 16 June 2018.
