= Chris Sole =

Scottish cricketer (born 1994)

Personal information
- Full name: Christopher Barclay Sole
- Born: 27 February 1994 (age 32); Aberdeen, Scotland
- Batting: Right-handed
- Bowling: Right-arm fast
- Role: Bowler
- Relatives: David Sole (father); Tom Sole (brother)

International information
- National side: Scotland (2016-present)
- ODI debut (cap 60): 16 August 2016 v UAE
- Last ODI: 25 October 2024 v United States
- T20I debut (cap 44): 19 January 2017 v Oman
- Last T20I: 7 September 2024 v Australia

Domestic team information
- Years: Team
- 2017–2018: Hampshire
- 2023: Saint Lucia Kings
- 2024: Sharjah Warriors
- 2024: Glamorgan
- 2024: Biratnagar Kings

Career statistics
Competition	ODI	T20I	FC	LA
Matches	31	17	3	35
Runs scored	71	21	33	83
Batting average	6.45	7.00	11.00	7.54
100s/50s	0/0	0/0	0/0	0/0
Top score	17	6	21	17
Balls bowled	1,514	337	432	1,730
Wickets	53	15	5	61
Bowling average	24.30	35.06	57.00	23.57
5 wickets in innings	0	0	0	0
10 wickets in match	0	0	0	0
Best bowling	4/27	3/28	3/79	4/24
Catches/stumpings	9/–	5/–	0/–	9/–
- Source: CricketArchive, 31 October 2024

Christopher Barclay Sole (born 27 February 1994) is a Scottish cricketer. He made his first-class debut in the 2015–17 ICC Intercontinental Cup on 9 August 2016 against the United Arab Emirates. He made his One Day International (ODI) debut in the 2015–17 ICC World Cricket League Championship on 16 August 2016, also against the United Arab Emirates. He made his Twenty20 International (T20I) debut for Scotland against Oman on 19 January 2017 in the 2017 Desert T20 Challenge. In September 2021, Sole was named in Scotland's provisional squad for the 2021 ICC Men's T20 World Cup. In WC Qualifier 2023, he clocked 150 km/h in a match-winning opening spell against Zimbabwe on 4 July, taking 3 wickets for 33 runs.

His father, David, played rugby union for Scotland and his brother, Tom, also plays cricket for Scotland.

In May 2024, he was named in Scotland's squad for the 2024 ICC Men's T20 World Cup tournament.
