= Michael Leask =

Scottish cricketer

Personal information
- Full name: Michael Alexander Leask
- Born: 29 October 1990 (age 36); Aberdeen, Scotland
- Batting: Right-handed
- Bowling: Right-arm off break
- Role: Batsman

International information
- National side: Scotland (2014–present)
- ODI debut (cap 56): 23 January 2014 v Canada
- Last ODI: 20 May 2026 v United States
- ODI shirt no.: 29
- T20I debut (cap 35): 4 July 2013 v Kenya
- Last T20I: 18 April 2026 v Namibia
- T20I shirt no.: 29

Domestic team information
- Years: Team
- 2014: Northamptonshire
- 2016–2017: Somerset
- 2026: Glasgow Cosmic

Career statistics
Competition	ODI	T20I	FC	LA
Matches	98	80	2	124
Runs scored	1,624	901	95	1,823
Batting average	26.19	15.80	31.66	23.07
100s/50s	1/8	0/1	0/1	1/8
Top score	107*	58	58	107*
Balls bowled	2,894	999	129	3,484
Wickets	74	59	3	88
Bowling average	32.95	21.27	43.66	34.20
5 wickets in innings	0	0	0	0
10 wickets in match	0	0	0	0
Best bowling	4/24	4/17	2/40	4/24
Catches/stumpings	40/–	32/–	4/–	45/–
- Source: Cricinfo, 25 May 2026

Michael Alexander Leask (born 29 October 1990) is a Scottish cricketer who plays for Scotland national cricket team and Forfarshire Cricket Club.

== Career ==
On 9 May 2014 at Aberdeen, he scored 42 off 16 balls in an ODI against England and was named as the man of the match, despite Scotland losing the game.

Ahead of the 2016 season, Leask signed for Somerset. In September 2017, after two seasons with Somerset, it was announced that Leask was to leave the county at the end of the season. He made his first-class debut for Scotland in the 2015–17 ICC Intercontinental Cup on 1 October 2017.

In June 2019, he was selected to represent Scotland A in their tour to Ireland to play the Ireland Wolves. In July 2019, he was selected to play for the Edinburgh Rocks in the inaugural edition of the Euro T20 Slam cricket tournament. However, the following month the tournament was cancelled.

In September 2019, he was named in Scotland's squad for the 2019 ICC T20 World Cup Qualifier tournament in the United Arab Emirates. In September 2021, Leask was named in Scotland's provisional squad for the 2021 ICC Men's T20 World Cup.

In May 2024, he was named in Scotland's squad for the 2024 ICC Men's T20 World Cup tournament.
