= Zimbabwean cricket team in the Netherlands in 2017 =

International cricket tour

	Netherlands	Zimbabwe
- Dates: 20 – 24 June 2017
Captains	Peter Borren	Graeme Cremer

LA series
- Result: Zimbabwe won the 3-match series 2–1
Most runs	Stephan Myburgh (124)	Craig Ervine (121)
Most wickets	Shane Snater (4); Paul van Meekeren (4)	Christopher Mpofu (7)

The Zimbabwe cricket team toured the Netherlands in June 2017 to play three List A matches. Some sources stated the matches would be One Day International (ODI) fixtures. However, the Netherlands do not have ODI status, so the matches were List A status only. The fixtures followed Zimbabwe's matches in Scotland. Zimbabwe won the series 2–1.

At the end of April 2017, the Netherlands announced a 24-man training squad ahead of the tour, which included Shane Snater, who was born in Zimbabwe. He was included in the final squad for the series. In September and October 2017, the Netherlands toured Zimbabwe, also playing three List A matches.

== Squads ==
Netherlands	Zimbabwe
Peter Borren (c); Wesley Barresi; Logan van Beek; Ben Cooper; Timm van der Gugten; Fred Klaassen; Paul van Meekeren; Roelof van der Merwe; Stephan Myburgh; Max O'Dowd; Michael Rippon; Shane Snater; Tobias Visee; Saqib Zulfiqar; Sikander Zulfiqar	Graeme Cremer (c); Ryan Burl; Tendai Chatara; Chamu Chibhabha; Craig Ervine; Hamilton Masakadza; Solomon Mire; Peter Moor; Christopher Mpofu; Tarisai Musakanda; Richard Ngarava; Sikandar Raza; Donald Tiripano; Malcolm Waller; Sean Williams

== Fixtures ==
=== 1st match ===
20 June 2017
Scorecard

Netherlands; 142 (37.5 overs)	v	Zimbabwe; 144/4 (30.2 overs)
Logan van Beek 64* (83); Tendai Chatara 5/34 (10 overs)		Craig Ervine 44 (59); Shane Snater 1/21 (6 overs)

Zimbabwe won by 6 wickets
VRA Cricket Ground, Amstelveen
Umpires: Rizwan Akram (Ned) and Huub Jansen (Ned)

- Netherlands won the toss and elected to bat.
- Sikander Zulfiqar (Ned) made his List A debut.

=== 2nd match ===
22 June 2017
Scorecard

Netherlands; 291/6 (50 overs)	v	Zimbabwe; 231/4 (36 overs)
Stephan Myburgh 77 (70); Sikandar Raza 3/40 (10 overs)		Solomon Mire 82 (71); Paul van Meekeren 2/36 (8 overs)

Zimbabwe won by 6 wickets (DLS method)
VRA Cricket Ground, Amstelveen
Umpires: Rizwan Akram (Ned) and Huub Jansen (Ned)

- Netherlands won the toss and elected to bat.
- Rain during Zimbabwe's innings set them a revised total of 229 runs from 37 overs.

=== 3rd match ===
24 June 2017
Scorecard

Netherlands; 279 (49.3 overs)	v	Zimbabwe; 130 (26.3 overs)
Michael Rippon 71 (79); Christopher Mpofu 4/41 (7 overs)		Malcolm Waller 50 (43); Roelof van der Merwe 3/7 (2.3 overs)

Netherlands won by 149 runs
Sportpark Westvliet, The Hague
Umpires: Rizwan Akram (Ned) and Pim van Liemt (Ned)

- Zimbabwe won the toss and elected to field.
- Fred Klaassen (Ned) made his List A debut.
