= Dutch cricket team in South Africa in 2021–22 and 2023 =

International cricket tour

Dutch cricket team in South Africa in 2021–22 and 2022–23
	South Africa	Netherlands
- Dates: 26 November 2021 – 2 April 2023
Captains	Keshav Maharaj (1st ODI); Temba Bavuma (2nd & 3rd ODIs)	Pieter Seelaar (1st ODI); Scott Edwards (2nd & 3rd ODIs)

One Day International series
- Results: South Africa won the 3-match series 2–0
Most runs	Aiden Markram (226)	Musa Ahmed (78)
Most wickets	Sisanda Magala (8)	Fred Klaassen (5)
- Player of the series: Aiden Markram (SA)

The Netherlands cricket team toured South Africa in November and December 2021 to play three One Day International (ODI) matches. The ODI series formed part of the inaugural 2020–2023 ICC Cricket World Cup Super League. The teams last played each other in May 2013, with South Africa winning a one-off ODI match. The tour was the first time that the two teams played each other in South Africa.

In late November 2021, a new variant of the COVID-19 virus was discovered in southern Africa. Initial reports stated that the tour had been called off during the morning of the first ODI, but flights to the Netherlands had been suspended until at least 3 December 2021. The following day, the second and third ODIs were officially postponed due to concerns around the new variant. The first ODI finished in a no result due to rain, after only two overs of the Dutch run chase. Both cricket boards were looking at rescheduling the matches within the current cycle of the Future Tours Programme.

Netherlands returned to South Africa in March and April 2023 to play the remaining two ODIs that were postponed. South Africa went on to win both the matches, and clinched the series 2–0.

== Squads ==
1st ODI		2nd & 3rd ODIs	
South Africa	Netherlands	South Africa	Netherlands
Keshav Maharaj (c); Junior Dala; Daryn Dupavillon; Zubayr Hamza; Reeza Hendricks; Sisanda Magala; Janneman Malan; David Miller; ~~Lungi Ngidi~~; Dwaine Pretorius; Andile Phehlukwayo; Wayne Parnell; Ryan Rickelton; Tabraiz Shamsi; Kyle Verreynne; ~~Lizaad Williams~~; Khaya Zondo	Pieter Seelaar (c); Colin Ackermann; Musa Ahmed; Bas de Leede; Scott Edwards (wk); Clayton Floyd; Brandon Glover; Boris Gorlee; Vivian Kingma; Fred Klaassen; Stephan Myburgh; Max O'Dowd; Shane Snater; Timm van der Gugten; Roelof van der Merwe; Saqib Zulfiqar	Temba Bavuma (c); Quinton de Kock; Bjorn Fortuin; Reeza Hendricks; Marco Jansen; Heinrich Klaasen; Sisanda Magala; Aiden Markram; David Miller; Lungi Ngidi; Anrich Nortje; Wayne Parnell; Kagiso Rabada; Tabraiz Shamsi; Rassie van der Dussen	Scott Edwards (c, wk); Shariz Ahmad; Musa Ahmed; Wesley Barresi; Tom Cooper; Aryan Dutt; Vivian Kingma; Fred Klaassen; Ryan Klein; Teja Nidamanuru; Max O'Dowd; Vikramjit Singh; ~~Roelof van der Merwe~~; Paul van Meekeren

For the first ODI, Lizaad Williams was ruled out of South Africa's squad due to an intercostal muscle strain and Lungi Ngidi was also ruled out of South Africa's squad following a positive COVID-19 test, with Junior Dala named as his replacement. Roelof van der Merwe withdrew from the Netherlands' squad for the last two ODIs citing personal reasons.

== Tour match ==
On 28 March 2023, the Netherlands played a 50-over warm up match against a South African Invitation XI side.

28 March 2023
10:00
Scorecard

Netherlands; 207 (50 overs)	v	South African Invitation XI; 208/7 (36 overs)
Scott Edwards 38 (65); Eathan Bosch 3/20 (10 overs)		Wihan Lubbe 46 (57); Ryan Klein 3/30 (6 overs)

South African Invitation XI won by 3 wickets
LC de Villiers Oval, Pretoria
Umpires: Mazizi Gampu (SA) and Phillip Vosloo (SA)

- South African Invitation XI won the toss and elected to field.

== ODI series ==
=== 1st ODI ===
26 November 2021
10:00
Scorecard

South Africa; 277/8 (50 overs)	v	Netherlands; 11/0 (2 overs)
Kyle Verreynne 95 (112); Fred Klaassen 2/45 (8 overs)		Max O'Dowd 9* (9)

No result
Centurion Park, Centurion
Umpires: Marais Erasmus (SA) and Adrian Holdstock (SA)

- Netherlands won the toss and elected to field.
- No further play was possible due to rain.
- Zubayr Hamza, Sisanda Magala (SA) and Colin Ackermann (Ned) all made their ODI debuts.
- World Cup Super League points: South Africa 5, Netherlands 5.

=== 2nd ODI ===
31 March 2023
13:00 (D/N)
Scorecard

Netherlands; 189 (46.1 overs)	v	South Africa; 190/2 (30 overs)
Teja Nidamanuru 48 (71); Tabraiz Shamsi 3/25 (10 overs)		Temba Bavuma 90* (79); Aryan Dutt 1/30 (6 overs)

South Africa won by 8 wickets
Willowmoore Park, Benoni
Umpires: Marais Erasmus (SA) and Allahudien Paleker (SA)
Player of the match: Sisanda Magala (SA)

- South Africa won the toss and elected to field.
- World Cup Super League points: South Africa 10, Netherlands 0.

=== 3rd ODI ===
2 April 2023
10:00
Scorecard

South Africa; 370/8 (50 overs)	v	Netherlands; 224 (39.1 overs)
Aiden Markram 175 (126); Fred Klaassen 2/43 (10 overs)		Musa Ahmed 61 (69); Sisanda Magala 5/43 (9 overs)

South Africa won by 146 runs
Wanderers Stadium, Johannesburg
Umpires: Marais Erasmus (SA) and Adrian Holdstock (SA)
Player of the match: Aiden Markram (SA)

- Netherlands won the toss and elected to field.
- Aiden Markram (SA) played in his 50th ODI.
- Aiden Markram scored his first century in ODIs.
- Sisanda Magala (SA) took his first five-wicket haul in ODIs.
- World Cup Super League points: South Africa 10, Netherlands 0.
