= Dutch cricket team in Zimbabwe in 2017–18 =

International cricket tour

Dutch cricket team in Zimbabwe in 2017
	Zimbabwe	Netherlands
- Dates: 27 September – 1 October 2017
Captains	Graeme Cremer	Peter Borren

LA series
- Result: Zimbabwe won the 3-match series 2–1
Most runs	Solomon Mire (142)	Peter Borren (170)
Most wickets	Richard Ngarava (4)	Michael Rippon (4)

The Dutch cricket team toured Zimbabwe in September and October 2017 to play three List A matches. The Netherlands played as Royal Netherlands Cricket Board XI (KNCB XI). Previously, Zimbabwe had toured the Netherlands, also playing three List A matches, in June 2017. Zimbabwe won the series 2–1.

== Squads ==
Zimbabwe	Netherlands
Graeme Cremer (c); Ryan Burl; Regis Chakabva; Tendai Chatara; Chamu Chibhabha; Craig Ervine; Hamilton Masakadza; Solomon Mire; Peter Moor; Christopher Mpofu; Tarisai Musakanda; Richard Ngarava; Sikandar Raza; Donald Tiripano; Malcolm Waller; Sean Williams	Peter Borren (c); Wesley Barresi; Ben Cooper; Quirijn Gunning; Timm van der Gugten; Vivian Kingma; Fred Klaassen; Bas de Leede; Paul van Meekeren; Roelof van der Merwe; Stephan Myburgh; Max O'Dowd; Michael Rippon; Pieter Seelaar; Tobias Visée; Sikander Zulfiqar

== Fixtures ==
=== 1st match ===
27 September 2017
09:30
Scorecard

Zimbabwe Select XI; 347/9 (50 overs)	v	KNCB XI; 254 (50 overs)
Solomon Mire 128 (107); Fred Klaassen 3/80 (10 overs)		Peter Borren 115 (116); Hamilton Masakadza 3/21 (4 overs)

Zimbabwe Select XI won by 93 runs
Harare Sports Club, Harare
Umpires: Sifelani Rwaziyeni (Zim) and Russell Tiffin (Zim)

- Zimbabwe Select XI won the toss and elected to bat.

=== 2nd match ===
29 September 2017
09:30
Scorecard

KNCB XI; 181 (50 overs)	v	Zimbabwe Select XI; 182/1 (26.4 overs)
Sikander Zulfiqar 33 (44); Christopher Mpofu 2/20 (9 overs)		Chamu Chibhabha 78* (81); Pieter Seelaar 1/24 (5 overs)

Zimbabwe Select XI won by 9 wickets
Harare Sports Club, Harare
Umpires: Owen Chirombe (Zim) and Stanley Gogwe (Zim)

- KNCB XI won the toss and elected to bat.
- Bas de Leede (KNCB XI) made his List A debut.

=== 3rd match ===
1 October 2017
09:30
Scorecard

Zimbabwe Select XI; 129 (30.3 overs)	v	KNCB XI; 134/5 (30.3 overs)
Sikandar Raza 42 (50); Paul van Meekeren 3/21 (6 overs)		Peter Borren 48* (49); Donald Tiripano 1/12 (4 overs)

KNCB XI won by 5 wickets
Harare Sports Club, Harare
Umpires: Iknow Chabi (Zim) and Jeremiah Matibiri (Zim)

- Zimbabwe Select XI won the toss and elected to bat.
