= Emirati cricket team in the Netherlands in 2017 =

International cricket tour

	Netherlands	United Arab Emirates
- Dates: 17 – 20 July 2017
Captains	Peter Borren	Rohan Mustafa

LA series
- Result: United Arab Emirates won the 3-match series 2–1
Most runs	Stephan Myburgh (113)	Muhammad Usman 131
Most wickets	Logan van Beek (10)	Rohan Mustafa (6)

The United Arab Emirates cricket team toured the Netherlands in July 2017 to play three List A matches. In the opening match, brothers Asad and Saqib Zulfiqar made their debuts and played alongside their other brother, Sikander Zulfiqar. It was the first time triplets had played in a professional cricket team together. The United Arab Emirates won the series 2–1.

== Squads ==
Netherlands	United Arab Emirates
Peter Borren (c); Wesley Barresi; Ben Cooper; Asad Zulfiqar; Fred Klaassen; Stephan Myburgh; Max O'Dowd; Shane Snater; Logan van Beek; Tobias Visee; Saqib Zulfiqar; Sikander Zulfiqar; Umar Baker; Paul van Meekeren	Rohan Mustafa (c); Shaiman Anwar; Ghulam Shabber; Mohammed Qasim; Rameez Shahzad; Muhammad Usman; Adnan Mufti; Chirag Suri; Ahmed Raza; Imran Haider; Mohammad Naveed; Amjad Javed; Zahoor Khan; Qadeer Ahmed

== Fixtures ==
=== 1st match ===
17 July 2017
Scorecard

Netherlands; 182/8 (50 overs)	v	United Arab Emirates; 186/7 (49 overs)
Peter Borren 56 (82); Amjad Javed 3/33 (10 overs)		Muhammad Usman 57* (80); Paul van Meekeren 3/22 (10 overs)

United Arab Emirates won by 3 wickets
VRA Cricket Ground, Amstelveen
Umpires: Rizwan Akram (Ned) and Pim van Liemt (Ned)

- Netherlands won the toss and elected to bat.
- Asad Zulfiqar and Saqib Zulfiqar (Ned) both made their List A debuts.

=== 2nd match ===
19 July 2017
Scorecard

Netherlands; 239/9 (50 overs)	v	United Arab Emirates; 240/5 (48.2 overs)
Ben Cooper 47 (55); Shaiman Anwar 3/31 (8 overs)		Rohan Mustafa 58 (58); Paul van Meekeren 2/27 (10 overs)

United Arab Emirates won by 5 wickets
VRA Cricket Ground, Amstelveen
Umpires: Huub Jansen (Ned) and Pim van Liemt (Ned)

- Netherlands won the toss and elected to bat.
- Umar Baker and Tobias Visee (Ned) both made their List A debuts.

=== 3rd match ===
20 July 2017
Scorecard

United Arab Emirates; 122 (25.2 overs)	v	Netherlands; 106/9 (27.5 overs)
Shaiman Anwar 35 (38); Logan van Beek 6/18 (7 overs)		Stephan Myburgh 47 (56); Rohan Mustafa 2/17 (4.5 overs)

Netherlands won by 1 wicket (DLS method)
Sportpark Westvliet, Voorburg
Umpires: Rizwan Akram (Ned) and Huub Jansen (Ned)

- Netherlands won the toss and elected to field.
- Netherlands were set a revised target of 103 runs from 28 overs
