= Zimbabwean cricket team in the Netherlands in 2019 =

International cricket tour

	Netherlands	Zimbabwe
- Dates: 19 – 25 June 2019
Captains	Pieter Seelaar	Hamilton Masakadza

One Day International series
- Results: Netherlands won the 2-match series 2–0
Most runs	Max O'Dowd (145)	Brendan Taylor (122)
Most wickets	Fred Klaassen (4)	Sean Williams (6)

Twenty20 International series
- Results: 2-match series drawn 1–1
Most runs	Roelof van der Merwe (87)	Craig Ervine (88)
Most wickets	Roelof van der Merwe (5)	Christopher Mpofu (4)

The Zimbabwe cricket team toured the Netherlands in June 2019 to play two One Day Internationals (ODIs) and two Twenty20 International (T20I) matches. The two teams last faced each other in an ODI match at the 2003 Cricket World Cup, with Zimbabwe winning by 99 runs. The last time the two sides played a T20I match against each other was during the 2014 ICC World Twenty20 tournament, with Zimbabwe winning by five wickets.

The Netherlands won the ODI series 2–0. It was their first ever ODI series win against a Full Member side. The T20I series was drawn 1–1, with Zimbabwe winning the second match in a Super Over.

== Squads ==
ODIs		T20Is	
Netherlands	Zimbabwe	Netherlands	Zimbabwe
Pieter Seelaar (c); Wesley Barresi; Ben Cooper; Scott Edwards (wk); Brandon Glover; Vivian Kingma; Fred Klaassen; Bas de Leede; Max O'Dowd; Roelof van der Merwe; Paul van Meekeren; Tobias Visee; Saqib Zulfiqar	Hamilton Masakadza (c); Ryan Burl; Tendai Chatara; Elton Chigumbura; Craig Ervine; Kyle Jarvis; Tinashe Kamunhukamwe; Solomon Mire; Peter Moor; Christopher Mpofu; Richmond Mutumbami (wk); Ainsley Ndlovu; Sikandar Raza; Brendan Taylor; Donald Tiripano; Sean Williams	Pieter Seelaar (c); Wesley Barresi; Ben Cooper; Scott Edwards (wk); Brandon Glover; Vivian Kingma; Fred Klaassen; Bas de Leede; Max O'Dowd; Roelof van der Merwe; Paul van Meekeren; Tobias Visee; Saqib Zulfiqar	Hamilton Masakadza (c); Ryan Burl; Tendai Chatara; Elton Chigumbura; Craig Ervine; Kyle Jarvis; Tinashe Kamunhukamwe; Solomon Mire; Peter Moor; Christopher Mpofu; Richmond Mutumbami (wk); Ainsley Ndlovu; Sikandar Raza; Brendan Taylor; Donald Tiripano; Sean Williams

== ODI series ==
=== 1st ODI ===
19 June 2019
11:00
Scorecard

Zimbabwe; 205/8 (47 overs)	v	Netherlands; 207/3 (42.5 overs)
Brendan Taylor 71 (85); Fred Klaassen 2/29 (10 overs)		Max O'Dowd 87* (121); Sean Williams 2/38 (9 overs)

Netherlands won by 7 wickets (DLS method)
Sportpark Het Schootsveld, Deventer
Umpires: Adrian Holdstock (SA) and Huub Jansen (Ned)

- Zimbabwe won the toss and elected to bat.
- Netherlands were set a revised target of 206 runs from 47 overs due to rain.
- Max O'Dowd, Tobias Visee (Ned) and Ainsley Ndlovu (Zim) all made their ODI debuts.
- Roelof van der Merwe also made his ODI debut for the Netherlands after previously playing 13 ODIs for South Africa, becoming the 12th cricketer to represent two international teams in ODIs.
- Ainsley Ndlovu (Zim) became the 26th bowler to take a wicket with his first delivery in ODIs.

=== 2nd ODI ===
21 June 2019
11:00
Scorecard

Zimbabwe; 290/6 (50 overs)	v	Netherlands; 291/7 (49.2 overs)
Sikandar Raza 85* (68); Fred Klaassen 2/53 (10 overs)		Max O'Dowd 59 (81); Sean Williams 4/43 (7 overs)

Netherlands won by 3 wickets
Sportpark Het Schootsveld, Deventer
Umpires: Adrian Holdstock (SA) and Pim van Liemt (Ned)

- Zimbabwe won the toss and elected to bat.
- Brandon Glover and Saqib Zulfiqar (Ned) both made their ODI debuts.
- This was the Netherlands' highest successful run chase in ODIs.

== T20I series ==
=== 1st T20I ===
23 June 2019
15:00 (D/N)
Scorecard

Netherlands; 199/6 (20 overs)	v	Zimbabwe; 150 (19.5 overs)
Roelof van der Merwe 75* (39); Christopher Mpofu 2/38 (4 overs)		Craig Ervine 59 (37); Brandon Glover 3/20 (4 overs)

Netherlands won by 49 runs
Hazelaarweg, Rotterdam
Umpires: Rizwan Akram (Ned) and Huub Jansen (Ned)

- Zimbabwe won the toss and elected to field.
- Brandon Glover (Ned) made his T20I debut.

=== 2nd T20I ===
25 June 2019
17:30 (D/N)
Scorecard

Netherlands; 152/8 (20 overs)	v	Zimbabwe; 152 (20 overs)
Max O'Dowd 56 (40); Sean Williams 2/28 (4 overs)		Brendan Taylor 40 (24); Roelof van der Merwe 4/35 (4 overs)

Match tied
(Zimbabwe won the Super Over)
Hazelaarweg, Rotterdam
Umpires: Rizwan Akram (Ned) and Huub Jansen (Ned)

- Netherlands won the toss and elected to bat.
