= 2018 Netherlands Tri-Nation Series =

International cricket tournament

- Date: 12–20 June 2018
- Location: Netherlands
- Result: Scotland won the tri-series
Teams
Ireland	Netherlands	Scotland
Captains
Gary Wilson	Pieter Seelaar	Kyle Coetzer
Most runs
Paul Stirling (176)	Max O'Dowd (90)	George Munsey (204)
Most wickets
George Dockrell (6) Simi Singh (6) Barry McCarthy (6)	Pieter Seelaar (5)	Alasdair Evans (5)

The 2018 Netherlands Tri-Nation Series was a cricket tournament, that took place in June 2018 in the Netherlands. It was a tri-nation series between Ireland, Netherlands and Scotland, with all the matches played as Twenty20 Internationals (T20Is). The intention was that the tri-series will become an annual event for the three teams.

Prior to the series, Scotland played two T20I matches against Pakistan, while Ireland used the matches as preparation for their matches against India, that took place later in June. Ahead of the series, Ireland named Gary Wilson as their new T20I captain, after William Porterfield stepped aside to focus on Test and One Day International (ODI) cricket.

The fourth match of the series, between Ireland and Scotland, ended in a tie, with no Super Over contested to determine the winner. However, both teams knew that there would not be a Super Over in the event of a tie before the match. The International Cricket Council (ICC) confirmed that there should have been a Super Over, and apologised for the oversight. In the event, the tied game proved pivotal as Scotland won the series, after two wins and a tie, with the Netherlands in second place and Ireland in third.

== Squads ==
Ireland	Netherlands	Scotland
Gary Wilson (c); Andrew Balbirnie; Peter Chase; George Dockrell; Barry McCarthy; Kevin O'Brien; William Porterfield; Stuart Poynter; Boyd Rankin; James Shannon; Simi Singh; Paul Stirling; Stuart Thompson; Craig Young	Pieter Seelaar (c); Wesley Barresi; Ben Cooper; Scott Edwards; Quirijn Gunning; Fred Klaassen; Bas de Leede; Max O'Dowd; Shane Snater; Ryan ten Doeschate; Timm van der Gugten; Paul van Meekeren; Roelof van der Merwe; Tobias Visee; Saqib Zulfiqar; Sikander Zulfiqar	Kyle Coetzer (c); Richie Berrington (vc); Dylan Budge; Matthew Cross; Alasdair Evans; Michael Leask; Calum MacLeod; George Munsey; Safyaan Sharif; Chris Sole; Hamza Tahir; Craig Wallace (wk); Mark Watt; Brad Wheal; Stuart Whittingham

Timm van der Gugten, Paul van Meekeren, Roelof van der Merwe and Ryan ten Doeschate were all tentatively named in the Netherlands' squad, with their availability confirmed on a match-by-match basis.

== Points table ==
Pos	Team	Pld	W	L	T	NR	Pts	NRR
1	Scotland	4	2	1	1	0	5	1.148
2	Netherlands	4	2	2	0	0	4	−1.553
3	Ireland	4	1	2	1	0	3	0.410

== T20I series ==
=== 1st T20I ===
12 June 2018
17:00 (D/N)
Scorecard

Netherlands; 144 (19.5 overs)	v	Ireland; 140/8 (20 overs)
Pieter Seelaar 36 (28); Simi Singh 3/23 (3.5 overs)		Simi Singh 57* (29); Pieter Seelaar 3/25 (4 overs)

Netherlands won by 4 runs
Hazelaarweg Stadion, Rotterdam
Umpires: Rizwan Akram (Ned) and Alan Neill (Ire)

- Ireland won the toss and elected to field.
- Pieter Seelaar captained the Netherlands for first time in T20Is.
- Scott Edwards, Fred Klaassen, Bas de Leede, Shane Snater, Saqib Zulfiqar (Ned) and Simi Singh (Ire) all made their T20I debuts.

=== 2nd T20I ===
13 June 2018
17:00 (D/N)
Scorecard

Ireland; 158/6 (20 overs)	v	Netherlands; 159/6 (19 overs)
Gary Wilson 45* (42); Roelof van der Merwe 2/24 (4 overs)		Max O'Dowd 39 (24); George Dockrell 2/30 (4 overs)

Netherlands won by 4 wickets
Hazelaarweg Stadion, Rotterdam
Umpires: Rizwan Akram (Ned) and Pim van Liemt (Ned)

- Ireland won the toss and elected to bat.

=== 3rd T20I ===
16 June 2018
17:00 (D/N)
Scorecard

Ireland; 205/5 (20 overs)	v	Scotland; 159/5 (20 overs)
Andrew Balbirnie 74 (40); Alasdair Evans 2/51 (4 overs)		George Munsey 41 (24); George Dockrell 2/15 (3 overs)

Ireland won by 46 runs
Sportpark Het Schootsveld, Deventer
Umpires: Huub Jansen (Ned) and Alan Neill (Ire)

- Ireland won the toss and elected to bat.
- Peter Chase (Ire) and Stuart Whittingham (Sco) both made their T20I debuts.

=== 4th T20I ===
17 June 2018
17:00 (D/N)
Scorecard

Scotland; 185/4 (20 overs)	v	Ireland; 185/6 (20 overs)
Kyle Coetzer 54 (41); Simi Singh 1/34 (4 overs)		Paul Stirling 81 (41); Safyaan Sharif 2/31 (4 overs)

Match tied
Sportpark Het Schootsveld, Deventer
Umpires: Allan Haggo (Sco) and Pim van Liemt (Ned)

- Scotland won the toss and elected to bat.
- George Dockrell (Ire) played in his 50th T20I.
- This was the tenth T20I match to end in a tie, and the first since the ICC playing conditions were implemented in September 2017, not to end with a Super Over.

=== 5th T20I ===
19 June 2018
17:00 (D/N)
Scorecard

Netherlands; 160/6 (20 overs)	v	Scotland; 161/3 (17.4 overs)
Wesley Barresi 53* (51); Alasdair Evans 2/32 (4 overs)		Richie Berrington 49* (32); Fred Klaassen 1/29 (4 overs)

Scotland won by 7 wickets
VRA Cricket Ground, Amstelveen
Umpires: Allan Haggo (Sco) and Huub Jansen (Ned)

- Netherlands won the toss and elected to bat.

=== 6th T20I ===
20 June 2018
11:00
Scorecard

Scotland; 221/3 (20 overs)	v	Netherlands; 106 (14 overs)
George Munsey 71 (34); Wesley Barresi 1/3 (1 over)		Scott Edwards 31* (27); Hamza Tahir 3/26 (4 overs)

Scotland won by 115 runs
VRA Cricket Ground, Amstelveen
Umpires: Allan Haggo (Sco) and Huub Jansen (Ned)

- Scotland won the toss and elected to bat.
- This was Scotland's highest score in T20Is.
- In terms of runs, this was both Scotland's biggest win and the Netherlands biggest defeat in T20Is.
