= English cricket team in the Netherlands in 2022 =

International cricket tour

| | Netherlands | England |
- Dates: 17 – 22 June 2022
| Captains | Pieter Seelaar (Note: Scott Edwards captained the Netherlands for the second and third ODIs.) | Eoin Morgan (Note: Jos Buttler captained England for the third ODI.) |

One Day International series
- Results: England won the 3-match series 3–0
| Most runs | Scott Edwards (214) | Jos Buttler (248); Phil Salt (248) |
| Most wickets | Paul van Meekeren (2); Pieter Seelaar (2); Aryan Dutt (2) | David Willey (8) |
- Player of the series: Jos Buttler (Eng)

The England cricket team toured the Netherlands in June 2022 to play three One Day International (ODI) matches, which formed part of the inaugural 2020–2023 ICC Cricket World Cup Super League. Originally, the tour was scheduled to take place in May 2021, but it was postponed due to the COVID-19 pandemic. All of the matches took place at the VRA Cricket Ground in Amstelveen, and was the first bilateral series between the two sides.

The matches were played between the second and third Test matches that England played against New Zealand. Netherlands captain Pieter Seelaar commented on his frustration of several players being unavailable for the national team due to their commitments in the T20 Blast.

In the first ODI, England were put into bat and went on to score the highest innings total in an ODI match, with 498/4 from their 50 overs. England also broke the highest total in a List A cricket match, surpassing the 496/4 that Surrey made in the 2007 Friends Provident Trophy. England then bowled the Netherlands out for 266 to win the match by 232 runs. Pieter Seelaar was ruled out of the second ODI due to a back injury, and he later announced his retirement from international cricket, with Scott Edwards captaining the team for the last two matches. England won the second ODI by six wickets, after the match was reduced to 41 overs per side due to a wet outfield, to win the series with a match to play. Prior to the third and final ODI, England's captain Eoin Morgan was ruled out of the match with a groin injury, with Jos Buttler named as the team's captain in his place. England won the third and final match by eight wickets to win the series 3–0. Six days after the end of the series, Eoin Morgan announced his retirement from international cricket.

== Squads ==
ODIs
| Netherlands | England |
|---|---|
| Pieter Seelaar (c); Scott Edwards (vc, wk); Musa Ahmed; Shariz Ahmad; Logan van Beek; Philippe Boissevain; Tom Cooper; Aryan Dutt; Clayton Floyd; Vivian Kingma; Fred Klaassen; Ryan Klein; Bas de Leede; Paul van Meekeren; Teja Nidamanuru; Max O'Dowd; Tim Pringle; Vikramjit Singh; Shane Snater | Eoin Morgan (c); Jos Buttler (vc, wk); Moeen Ali; Brydon Carse; Sam Curran; Liam Livingstone; Dawid Malan; David Payne; Adil Rashid; Jason Roy; Phil Salt; Reece Topley; David Willey; Luke Wood |

Paul van Meekeren and Fred Klaassen were added to the Dutch squad for the third ODI.

== ODI series ==
=== 1st ODI ===
17 June 2022
11:00
Scorecard

| England; 498/4 (50 overs) | v | Netherlands; 266 (49.4 overs) |
| Jos Buttler 162* (70); Pieter Seelaar 2/83 (9 overs) | | Scott Edwards 72* (56); Moeen Ali 3/57 (10 overs) |

England won by 232 runs
VRA Cricket Ground, Amstelveen
Umpires: Rizwan Akram (Ned) and Paul Reiffel (Aus)
Player of the match: Jos Buttler (Eng)

- Netherlands won the toss and elected to field.
- Phil Salt (Eng) scored his first century in ODIs.
- Dawid Malan (Eng) scored his first century in ODIs.
- Jos Buttler (Eng) scored his 10th century in ODIs.
- England's total of 498 set a new record for the highest total in an ODI match, beating the previous record of 481 that they set against Australia in 2018.
- England scored the most sixes in an innings by a team in ODIs (26), beating their own record they set against Afghanistan in the 2019 Cricket World Cup.
- World Cup Super League points: England 10, Netherlands 0.

=== 2nd ODI ===
19 June 2022
11:00
Scorecard

| Netherlands; 235/7 (41 overs) | v | England; 239/4 (36.1 overs) |
| Scott Edwards 78 (73); David Willey 2/46 (8 overs) | | Phil Salt 77 (54); Aryan Dutt 2/55 (9 overs) |

England won by 6 wickets
VRA Cricket Ground, Amstelveen
Umpires: Nitin Bathi (Ned) and Paul Reiffel (Aus)
Player of the match: Jason Roy (Eng)

- Netherlands won the toss and elected to bat.
- The match was reduced to 41 overs per side due to a wet outfield.
- Tim Pringle (Ned) made his ODI debut.
- Jason Roy (Eng) played in his 100th ODI.
- Jos Buttler (Eng) played in his 150th ODI.
- World Cup Super League points: England 10, Netherlands 0.

=== 3rd ODI ===
22 June 2022
11:00
Scorecard

| Netherlands; 244 (49.2 overs) | v | England; 248/2 (30.1 overs) |
| Scott Edwards 64 (72); David Willey 4/36 (8.2 overs) | | Jason Roy 101* (86); Paul van Meekeren 2/59 (7 overs) |

England won by 8 wickets
VRA Cricket Ground, Amstelveen
Umpires: Rizwan Akram (Ned) and Paul Reiffel (Aus)
Player of the match: Jason Roy (Eng)

- England won the toss and elected to field.
- David Payne (Eng) made his ODI debut.
- Jason Roy (Eng) scored his 10th century in ODIs.
- World Cup Super League points: England 10, Netherlands 0.
