= New Zealand cricket team in the Netherlands in 2022 =

International cricket tour

	Netherlands	New Zealand
- Dates: 4 – 5 August 2022
Captains	Scott Edwards	Mitchell Santner

Twenty20 International series
- Results: New Zealand won the 2-match series 2–0
Most runs	Bas de Leede (119)	Mitchell Santner (84)
Most wickets	Tim Pringle (2); Shariz Ahmad (2); Logan van Beek (2)	Blair Tickner (5)

The New Zealand cricket team toured the Netherlands in August 2022 to play two Twenty20 International (T20I) matches. It was the first time that the New Zealand team had toured the Netherlands since 1986. The tour was originally scheduled for to take place in June 2020 before it was postponed in April 2020 due to the COVID-19 pandemic. On 19 July 2022, the date of the second T20I was brought forward by one day due to a cancellation of a connecting flight for the New Zealand team's tour of the West Indies. During the 2022 summer, New Zealand also toured England, Ireland and Scotland prior to this series.

== Squads ==
T20Is
Netherlands	New Zealand
Scott Edwards (c, wk); Shariz Ahmad; Logan van Beek; Tom Cooper; Aryan Dutt; Clayton Floyd; Vivian Kingma; Ryan Klein; Bas de Leede; Stephan Myburgh; Teja Nidamanuru; Max O'Dowd; Tim Pringle; Vikramjit Singh	Mitchell Santner (c); Finn Allen; Michael Bracewell; Mark Chapman; Dane Cleaver (wk); Jacob Duffy; Lockie Ferguson; Martin Guptill; ~~Adam Milne~~; Daryl Mitchell; James Neesham; Glenn Phillips; Michael Rippon; Ben Sears; Ish Sodhi; Blair Tickner

Adam Milne was ruled out of New Zealand's squad due to an Achilles injury with Jacob Duffy named as his replacement.

== T20I Series ==
=== 1st T20I ===
4 August 2022
17:00 (D/N)
Scorecard

New Zealand; 148/7 (20 overs)	v	Netherlands; 132 (19.3 overs)
Martin Guptill 45 (36); Shariz Ahmad 2/15 (3 overs)		Bas de Leede 66 (53); Blair Tickner 4/27 (3.3 overs)

New Zealand won by 16 runs
Sportpark Westvliet, Voorburg
Umpires: Rizwan Akram (Ned) and Nitin Bathi (Ned)
Player of the match: Bas de Leede (Ned)

- New Zealand won the toss and elected to bat.
- Ryan Klein (Ned) made his T20I debut.

=== 2nd T20I ===
5 August 2022
17:00 (D/N)
Scorecard

Netherlands; 147/4 (20 overs)	v	New Zealand; 149/2 (14 overs)
Bas de Leede 53* (48); Michael Bracewell 2/20 (4 overs)		Mitchell Santner 77* (42); Bas de Leede 1/13 (2 overs)

New Zealand won by 8 wickets
Sportpark Westvliet, Voorburg
Umpires: Rizwan Akram (Ned) and Adriaan van den Dries (Ned)
Player of the match: Mitchell Santner (NZ)

- Netherlands won the toss and elected to bat.
