= Zulfiqar Ahmed (Dutch cricketer) =

Dutch cricketer

Personal information
- Full name: Zulfiqar Ahmed (Note: Some sources give his name as "Ahmed Zulfiqar", per Dutch naming customs.)
- Born: 23 February 1966 (age 60); Sialkot, Pakistan
- Batting: Right-handed
- Bowling: Right-arm off break
- Relatives: Asad Zulfiqar (son); Saqib Zulfiqar (son); Sikander Zulfiqar (son)

International information
- National side: Netherlands (1991–2002)

Career statistics
Competition	List A
Matches	9
Runs scored	183
Batting average	20.33
100s/50s	0/1
Top score	63
Balls bowled	126
Wickets	4
Bowling average	38.00
5 wickets in innings	0
10 wickets in match	0
Best bowling	2/53
Catches/stumpings	3/–
- Source: CricketArchive, 17 August 2017

Zulfiqar Ahmed (Punjabi:ذوالفقار احمد; born 23 February 1966) is a former international cricketer who represented the Dutch national side between 1991 and 2002. He primarily played as a right-handed middle-order batsman, although he occasionally opened the batting.

Ahmed was born in Sialkot, Pakistan, and emigrated to the Netherlands in 1987, joining his uncle and brother there. He joined the Schiedam-based Excelsior '20 club, and made his Hoofdklasse debut in 1990. Ahmed made his national debut for the Netherlands in April 1991, on a tour of England. For the 1991 Hofdklasse season, he switched to the Voorburg Cricket Club, which he would play for throughout the rest of his international career. Following his international debut, Ahmed did not return to the national team until July 1995, when he represented the Netherlands in a quadrangular tournament in Scotland (also featuring the Danish and Scottish national teams.)

In June 1996, Ahmed was selected for a NatWest Trophy fixture against Surrey, his first List A appearance. At the 1997 ICC Trophy in Malaysia, he played in six of his team's seven matches, but only had the opportunity to bat twice. He fared better at the 2001 ICC Trophy in Canada, playing in seven out of ten matches and scoring 150 runs, ranking him fifth in runs for the Netherlands. Against Ireland, he scored 87 runs from 125 balls, which was his team's highest individual score of the tournament. In between ICC Trophy appearances, Ahmed had represented the Netherlands at the 2000 ICC Emerging Nations Challenge in Zimbabwe, scoring a maiden List-A half-century, 63 runs, against Zimbabwe A. He also played two more NatWest Trophy matches in that time, against Worcestershire in 1997 and Lincolnshire in 2000. Ahmed's last match for the national team came in September 2002, a C&G Trophy fixture against Bedfordshire.

Ahmed is the father of triplets, Asad, Saqib, and Sikander Zulfiqar. His three sons have played together at underage levels for the Netherlands, with Sikander having graduated to the senior team. The triplets played together in a List A match for the Netherlands against the United Arab Emirates on 17 July 2017, making it the first instance of three siblings playing for a professional cricket team in the same game.

In 2017, Ahmed coached the Belgian national team at the 2017 ICC World Cricket League Europe Region Division One.
