= Bangladesh and Thailand women's cricket teams in the Netherlands in 2019 =

Cricket tournament

The Bangladesh and Thailand women's cricket teams toured the Netherlands in August 2019 to play Women's Twenty20 International (WT20I) matches in preparation for the 2019 ICC Women's World Twenty20 Qualifier. Bangladesh played two WT20I matches against Thailand, with one match against the host nation in between those matches. The venue for all of the matches was Sportpark Maarschalkerweerd in Utrecht. Prior to the series, Thailand and the Netherlands also competed in the 2019 Netherlands Women's Quadrangular Series.

Bangladesh won all three matches of the series.

== WT20I matches ==
=== Bangladesh v Thailand 1st WT20I ===
21 August 2019
15:00
Scorecard

Thailand; 68/5 (20 overs)	v	Bangladesh; 69/4 (19.3 overs)
Nannapat Koncharoenkai 30 (48); Salma Khatun 2/6 (4 overs)		Ayasha Rahman 22 (31); Sornnarin Tippoch 1/8 (4 overs)

Bangladesh won by 6 wickets
Sportpark Maarschalkerweerd, Utrecht
Umpires: Huub Jansen (Ned) and Pim van Liemt (Ned)

- Thailand won the toss and elected to bat.
- Rosenanee Kanoh (Tha) made her WT20I debut.

=== Netherlands v Bangladesh only WT20I ===
23 August 2019
15:00
Scorecard

Bangladesh; 135/3 (20 overs)	v	Netherlands; 70/8 (20 overs)
Sanjida Islam 39 (49); Caroline de Lange 2/16 (4 overs)		Sterre Kalis 29 (47); Nahida Akter 4/11 (4 overs)

Bangladesh won by 65 runs
Sportpark Maarschalkerweerd, Utrecht
Umpires: Nitin Bathi (Ned) and Huub Jansen (Ned)

- Bangladesh won the toss and elected to bat.
- Sobhana Mostary (Ban) made her WT20I debut.

=== Bangladesh v Thailand 2nd WT20I ===
26 August 2019
15:00
Scorecard

Thailand; 87/5 (20 overs)	v	Bangladesh; 88/7 (18.2 overs)
Naruemol Chaiwai 25 (41); Nahida Akter 2/9 (3 overs)		Nigar Sultana 39 (38); Nattaya Boochatham 3/13 (4 overs)

Bangladesh won by 3 wickets
Sportpark Maarschalkerweerd, Utrecht
Umpires: Maulik Prabhudesai (Ned) and Ruud Kaulingfreks (Ned)

- Thailand won the toss and elected to bat.
