= Asad Zulfiqar =

Dutch cricketer (born 1997)

Personal information
- Full name: Asad Zulfiqar
- Born: 28 March 1997 (age 29)
- Batting: Right-handed
- Bowling: Right-arm off break
- Relatives: Zulfiqar Ahmed (father); Saqib Zulfiqar (brother); Sikander Zulfiqar (brother)

International information
- National side: Netherlands (2017–present)

Career statistics
Competition	List A
Matches	3
Runs scored	39
Batting average	13.00
100s/50s	0/0
Top score	17
Catches/stumpings	2/–
- Source: ESPNcricinfo, 5 January 2022

Asad Zulfiqar (born 28 March 1997) is a Dutch cricketer who plays for the Netherlands cricket team. He made his List A debut for the Netherlands against the United Arab Emirates on 17 July 2017. In the match, he played alongside his brothers Saqib and Sikander (the three are triplets), making it the first instance of three siblings playing for a professional cricket team in the same game.

In January 2022, Zulfiqar was named in the Dutch One Day International (ODI) squad for their series against Afghanistan in Qatar.
