= Visee =

Visee is a surname. Notable people with the surname include:

- Robert de Visée, French lutenist
- Tobias Visee (born 1991), Dutch cricketer
