= Carst Posthuma =

Dutch cricketer (1868–1939)

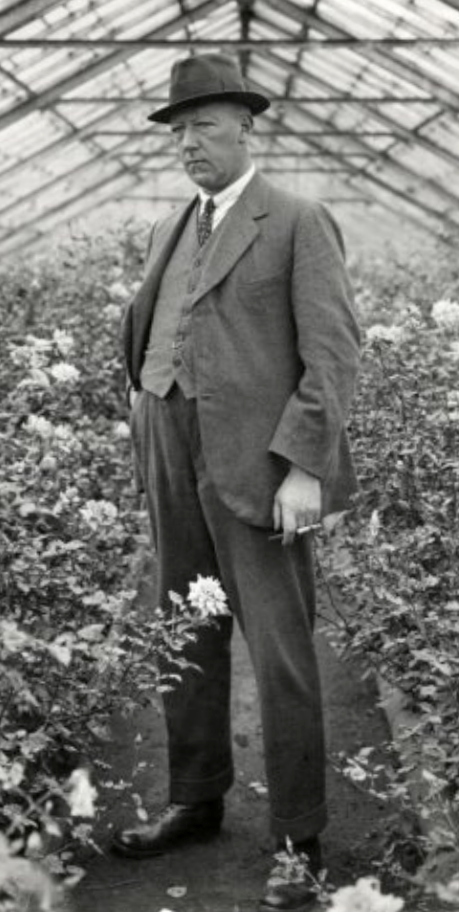
- Posthuma in 1920

Personal information
- Full name: Carst Jan Posthuma
- Born: 11 January 1868; Harlingen, Friesland, Netherlands
- Died: 21 December 1939 (aged 71); Near Haarlem, North Holland, Netherlands
- Batting: Left-handed
- Bowling: Left-arm fast

International information
- National side: Netherlands

Domestic team information
- Years: Team
- 1903: London County

Career statistics
Competition	First-class
Matches	5
Runs scored	45
Batting average	7.50
100s/50s	0/0
Top score	29
Balls bowled	644
Wickets	23
Bowling average	15.04
5 wickets in innings	2
10 wickets in match	1
Best bowling	7/68
Catches/stumpings	1/–
- Source: CricketArchive, 17 January 2011

Carst Jan Posthuma (11 January 1868 – 21 December 1939) was a Dutch cricket player of the late 19th and early 20th centuries. He was a left-handed batsman and left-arm fast bowler.

Posthuma played 72 times for the Dutch national team up to 1928, when he was sixty years old. He holds the Dutch record for most wickets in a career, taking 2,338 wickets at an average of 8.67. He was also the first Dutchman to take 100 wickets in a season in 1900, and the first to score a century in domestic cricket in 1894. He took part in brief tours of England by Netherlands teams in 1892, 1894, 1901 and 1906.

Posthuma spent the 1903 season in England playing amateur cricket. Dogged by injury, he missed several weeks and was never able to bowl at his quickest, but he played five first-class games for W. G. Grace's London County Cricket Club. In his five matches, he took 23 wickets at an average of 15.04, with best bowling figures of 7/68 coming against Leicestershire.

During World War I, Posthuma organised cricket matches for British troops, and hosted troops at his country house near Haarlem. He was a noted rose grower and became a world authority on roses.
