= Sikander Zulfiqar =

Dutch cricketer (born 1997)

Personal information
- Full name: Sikander Zulfiqar
- Born: 28 March 1997 (age 29)
- Batting: Right-handed
- Bowling: Right-arm fast
- Relatives: Zulfiqar Ahmed (father); Asad Zulfiqar (brother); Saqib Zulfiqar (brother)

International information
- National side: Netherlands (2016–present)
- T20I debut (cap 36): 3 February 2016 v UAE
- Last T20I: 1 September 2025 v Bangladesh

Career statistics
Competition	T20I	FC	LA	T20
Matches	12	1	11	12
Runs scored	70	20	268	70
Batting average	8.75	20.00	44.66	8.75
100s/50s	0/0	0/0	0/2	0/0
Top score	18	20	58	18
Balls bowled	60	66	–	60
Wickets	3	1	–	3
Bowling average	26.33	62.00	–	26.33
5 wickets in innings	0	0	–	0
10 wickets in match	0	0	–	0
Best bowling	1/9	1/42	–	1/9
Catches/stumpings	4/–	0/–	0/–	4/–
- Source: Cricinfo, 21 February 2026

Sikander Zulfiqar (born 28 March 1997) is a Dutch cricketer who plays for the Netherlands cricket team. He made his Twenty20 International debut against the United Arab Emirates on 3 February 2016. He made his first-class debut against Hong Kong in the 2015–2017 ICC Intercontinental Cup tournament on 10 February 2017. He made his List A debut against Zimbabwe on 20 June 2017.

On 17 July 2017, he played in the same match with his brothers Asad and Saqib, when they faced the United Arab Emirates at the VRA Amsterdam Cricket Ground, Amstelveen. The three brothers are triplets. It was the first instance of three siblings playing for a professional cricket team in the same game.

In July 2019, he was selected to play for the Amsterdam Knights in the inaugural edition of the Euro T20 Slam cricket tournament. However, the following month the tournament was cancelled. In April 2020, he was one of seventeen Dutch-based cricketers to be named in the team's senior squad.
