= Sportpark Het Schootsveld =

Cricket ground in Deventer, Netherlands

Coordinates: 52°15′09.10″N 06°13′33.70″E

- Salland Cricket Club Ground

Ground information
- Location: Deventer, Netherlands
- Establishment: 1975 (first recorded match)

International information
- First ODI: 19 June 2019: Netherlands v Zimbabwe
- Last ODI: 21 June 2019: Netherlands v Zimbabwe
- First T20I: 16 June 2018: Ireland v Scotland
- Last T20I: 15 August 2023: Germany v Guernsey
- First WODI: 5 August 2007: Netherlands v South Africa
- Last WODI: 9 July 2008: Netherlands v West Indies
- First WT20I: 6 July 2008: Netherlands v West Indies
- Last WT20I: 14 August 2019: Netherlands v Thailand

Team information
| Netherlands |
- As of 15 August 2023; Source: Cricinfo

Sportpark Het Schootsveld (Salland Cricket Club Ground) is a cricket ground in Deventer, the Netherlands. The first recorded match held on the ground came in 1975 when Dansk XL Club played The Forty Club. The ground later held four ICC Trophy matches in the 1990. The ground held its first List A match in 1999 when the Netherlands played Cambridgeshire in the NatWest Trophy. Two further List A matches have been played there, both in the 2011 Clydesdale Bank 40 when the Netherlands played Middlesex and Derbyshire. The ground held its first first-class match in 2004 when the Netherlands hosted Ireland in the ICC Intercontinental Cup. Two further first-class matches have been held there, one in the 2009–10 Intercontinental Cup when Scotland were the visitors, and another in the 2011–13 Intercontinental Cup which saw Kenya as the visitors.

At this venue, on 17 June 2018, a T20I between Scotland and Ireland was ended in a tie, though no Super Over was played. It was the tenth T20I match to end in a tie, and the first since the ICC playing conditions were implemented in September 2017, not to end with a Super Over. However, both teams knew that there would not be a Super Over in the event of a tie before the match. The International Cricket Council (ICC) confirmed that there should have been a Super Over, and apologised for the oversight.

The ground was used by Kon UD.
