= Brandon Glover =

Dutch cricketer (born 1997)

Personal information
- Full name: Brandon Dale Glover
- Born: 3 April 1997 (age 29); Johannesburg, South Africa
- Batting: Right-handed
- Bowling: Right-arm fast
- Role: Bowler

International information
- National side: Netherlands (2019–2024)
- ODI debut (cap 69): 21 June 2019 v Zimbabwe
- Last ODI: 21 March 2023 v Zimbabwe
- ODI shirt no.: 20
- T20I debut (cap 44): 23 June 2019 v Zimbabwe
- Last T20I: 26 August 2024 v Canada
- T20I shirt no.: 20

Domestic team information
- Years: Team
- 2016–2019: Boland
- 2020–2022: Northamptonshire
- 2023–2024: Durham

Career statistics
Competition	ODI	T20I	FC	LA
Matches	9	25	10	20
Runs scored	29	6	38	106
Batting average	14.50	2.00	4.22	15.14
100s/50s	0/0	0/0	0/0	0/0
Top score	18	4*	12*	27
Balls bowled	438	491	1,320	853
Wickets	9	37	24	16
Bowling average	49.33	15.27	34.45	57.56
5 wickets in innings	0	0	0	0
10 wickets in match	0	0	0	0
Best bowling	3/43	4/12	4/83	3/43
Catches/stumpings	3/–	5/–	1/–	4/–
- Source: Cricinfo, 29 September 2024

Brandon Dale Glover (born 3 April 1997) is a Dutch-South African cricketer who has played for the Netherlands national cricket team since 2019. He has also played for Boland in South African domestic cricket and for Northamptonshire and Durham in English county cricket. He is a right-arm pace bowler.

== Personal life ==
Glover was born on 3 April 1997 in Johannesburg, South Africa. He holds a Dutch passport through his Dutch mother. He studied accounting at the University of Stellenbosch.

== Domestic and franchise cricket ==
Glover made his first-class debut for Boland in the 2016–17 Sunfoil 3-Day Cup on 20 October 2016. He made his List A debut for Boland in the 2016–17 CSA Provincial One-Day Challenge on 26 March 2017.

In July 2019, he was selected to play for the Amsterdam Knights in the inaugural edition of the Euro T20 Slam cricket tournament. However, the following month the tournament was cancelled.

In August 2020, Glover played his first match for Northamptonshire County Cricket Club, in the 2020 Bob Willis Trophy.

Glover joined Durham in January 2023 but left after only making 10 appearances for the club when his contract expired in October 2024.

== International cricket ==
Glover trained with the Dutch squad prior to the 2018 Cricket World Cup Qualifier at the invitation of head coach Ryan Campbell. He subsequently began playing for Voorburg Cricket Club in The Hague. In March 2019, he was selected in the national training squad, and in June 2019 he was named in the Netherlands' squad for their series against Zimbabwe. He made his One Day International (ODI) debut for the Netherlands against Zimbabwe on 21 June 2019. He made his Twenty20 International (T20I) debut against Zimbabwe on 23 June 2019.

In September 2019, he was named in the Dutch squad for the 2019 ICC T20 World Cup Qualifier tournament in the United Arab Emirates. He was the leading wicket-taker for the Netherlands in the tournament, with sixteen dismissals in eight matches.

In September 2021, Glover was named in the Dutch squad for the 2021 ICC Men's T20 World Cup.
