= Saqib Zulfiqar =

Dutch cricketer (born 1997)

Personal information
- Full name: Saqib Zulfiqar
- Born: 28 March 1997 (age 29); North Holland, Netherlands
- Batting: Right-handed
- Bowling: Slow left-arm orthodox
- Role: Batsman
- Relatives: Zulfiqar Ahmed (father); Asad Zulfiqar (brother); Sikander Zulfiqar (brother)

International information
- National side: Netherlands (2017–present)
- ODI debut (cap 70): 21 June 2019 v Zimbabwe
- Last ODI: 3 November 2023 v Afghanistan
- T20I debut (cap 41): 12 June 2018 v Ireland
- Last T20I: 11 July 2025 v Italy

Career statistics
Competition	ODI	T20I	FC	LA
Matches	15	12	1	18
Runs scored	194	77	5	237
Batting average	14.92	12.83	2.50	14.81
100s/50s	0/0	0/0	0/0	0/0
Top score	34*	25*	5	34*
Balls bowled	312	108	24	318
Wickets	9	4	0	9
Bowling average	37.33	28.25	–	38.33
5 wickets in innings	0	0	–	0
10 wickets in match	0	0	–	0
Best bowling	2/43	2/16	–	2/43
Catches/stumpings	4/–	4/–	2/–	5/–
- Source: Cricinfo, 9 August 2025

Mohammad Saqib Zulfiqar (born 28 March 1997) is a Dutch cricketer. He made his List A debut for the Netherlands against the United Arab Emirates on 17 July 2017. In the match, he played alongside the other two of the triplet brothers Asad and Sikander, making it the first instance of three siblings playing for a professional cricket team in the same game. He made his first-class debut for the Netherlands in the 2015–2017 ICC Intercontinental Cup on 15 August 2017.

== International career ==
Zulfiqar was born in the Netherlands and is of Pakistani descent. In June 2018, he was named in the Netherlands' Twenty20 International (T20I) squad for the 2018 Netherlands Tri-Nation Series. He made his T20I debut against Ireland on 12 June 2018.

In June 2019, he was named in the Netherlands' One Day International (ODI) squad for their series against Zimbabwe. He made his ODI debut for the Netherlands against Zimbabwe on 21 June 2019. In April 2020, he was one of seventeen Dutch-based cricketers to be named in the team's senior squad.

== T20 career ==
In July 2019, he was selected to play for the Rotterdam Rhinos in the inaugural edition of the Euro T20 Slam cricket tournament. However, the following month the tournament was cancelled.
