= Tobias Visee =

Dutch cricketer (born 1991)

Personal information
- Full name: Tobias Pepijn Visee
- Born: 21 January 1991 (age 35); The Hague, Netherlands
- Batting: Right-handed
- Role: Wicket-keeper-batsman

International information
- National side: Netherlands (2015–2019)
- ODI debut (cap 68): 19 June 2019 v Zimbabwe
- Last ODI: 20 May 2021 v Scotland
- T20I debut (cap 33): 1 July 2015 v Nepal
- Last T20I: 24 April 2021 v Nepal

Career statistics
Competition	ODI	T20I	FC	LA
Matches	3	31	1	10
Runs scored	72	496	30	194
Batting average	24.00	16.00	30.00	19.39
100s/50s	0/0	0/3	0/0	0/0
Top score	41	78	30	42
Catches/stumpings	2/–	5/0	3/0	14/0
- Source: Cricinfo, 20 May 2021

Tobias Visee (born 21 January 1991) is a Dutch cricketer. He made his Twenty20 International (T20I) debut for the Netherlands against Nepal on 1 July 2015. He made his List A debut against the United Arab Emirates on 19 July 2017. He made his first-class debut for the Netherlands in the 2015–17 ICC Intercontinental Cup on 15 August 2017.

In June 2019, he was named in the Netherlands One Day International (ODI) squad for their series against Zimbabwe, making his ODI debut in that series on 19 June 2019.

In June 2019, he was selected to play for the Vancouver Knights franchise team in the 2019 Global T20 Canada tournament. In July 2019, he was selected to play for the Amsterdam Knights in the inaugural edition of the Euro T20 Slam cricket tournament. However, the following month the tournament was cancelled.

In September 2019, he was named in the Dutch squad for the 2019 ICC T20 World Cup Qualifier tournament in the United Arab Emirates. In April 2020, he was one of seventeen Dutch-based cricketers to be named in the team's senior squad. In September 2021, Visee was named as one of two reserve players in the Dutch squad for the 2021 ICC Men's T20 World Cup.
