= Solomon Mire =

Zimbabwean cricketer

Personal information
- Full name: Solomon Farai Mire
- Born: 21 August 1989 (age 37); Harare, Zimbabwe
- Batting: Right-handed
- Bowling: Right-arm medium
- Role: All-rounder

International information
- National side: Zimbabwe (2014-2019)
- Test debut (cap 102): 21 October 2017 v West Indies
- Last Test: 29 October 2017 v West Indies
- ODI debut (cap 123): 21 November 2014 v Bangladesh
- Last ODI: 7 July 2019 v Ireland
- ODI shirt no.: 27
- T20I debut (cap 47): 5 February 2018 v Afghanistan
- Last T20I: 14 July 2019 v Ireland

Domestic team information
- Years: Team
- 2013–2014: Melbourne Renegades

Career statistics
Competition	Test	ODI	T20I	T20
Matches	2	47	9	29
Runs scored	78	955	253	594
Batting average	19.50	20.31	31.62	23.76
100s/50s	0/0	1/3	0/2	1/3
Top score	47	112	94	109
Balls bowled	84	507	72	255
Wickets	1	12	1	14
Bowling average	32.00	42.91	115.00	27.28
5 wickets in innings	0	0	0	0
10 wickets in match	0	0	0	0
Best bowling	1/27	4/43	1/15	3/24
Catches/stumpings	0/–	12/–	2/–	9/–
- Source: Cricinfo, 19 July 2019

Solomon Farai Mire (born 21 August 1989) is a Zimbabwean former cricketer. An all-rounder, Mire represented Zimbabwe at international level in Tests, One Day Internationals (ODIs) and Twenty20 Internationals (T20Is) from November 2014 to July 2019 before announcing his retirement from international cricket in July 2019. Known for quick scoring, Mire usually opened the batting in ODIs and bowled medium pace. He also played for the Melbourne Renegades in the Australian Big Bash League.

== Domestic career ==
Born in Harare, Zimbabwe, Mire played for the Zimbabwe Under 19s before making his first class debut for Zimbabwean domestic side Centrals in the Logan Cup match against Westerns at Bulawayo on 12 April 2007.

Mire moved to Australia in 2012 to further his cricket career. While playing for Darwin club Waratahs in a one-day match in 2013, Mire scored a tournament record 260, from 157 balls with 21 sixes and 13 fours. In November 2013, Mire was signed to Australian Big Bash League team, Melbourne Renegades for the 2013–14 Big Bash League season.

== International career ==
Mire was included to the Zimbabwean squad for their 2014 tour of Bangladesh, where he made his ODI debut for Zimbabwe on 21 November 2014.

On 30 June 2017, Mire scored his maiden ODI century, which came against Sri Lanka at Galle International Stadium. The century gave Zimbabwe's first ODI victory against Sri Lanka in Sri Lanka. The chased total of 316 was the highest successful chase ever in Sri Lanka and first chase of a total more than 300 in Sri Lanka. Mire was adjudged man of the match for his all-round performance.

In October 2017, he was named in Zimbabwe's Test squad for their series against the West Indies. He made his Test debut for Zimbabwe against the West Indies on 21 October 2017.

He made his Twenty20 International (T20I) debut for Zimbabwe against Afghanistan on 5 February 2018.

In July 2019, the International Cricket Council (ICC) suspended Zimbabwe Cricket, with the team barred from taking part in ICC events. As a result, Mire announced his retirement from international cricket.

== Post-career ==
Mire returned to Australia after his international retirement, living in Melbourne and working as a cricket coach.
