= Shane Snater =

Dutch cricketer (born 1996)

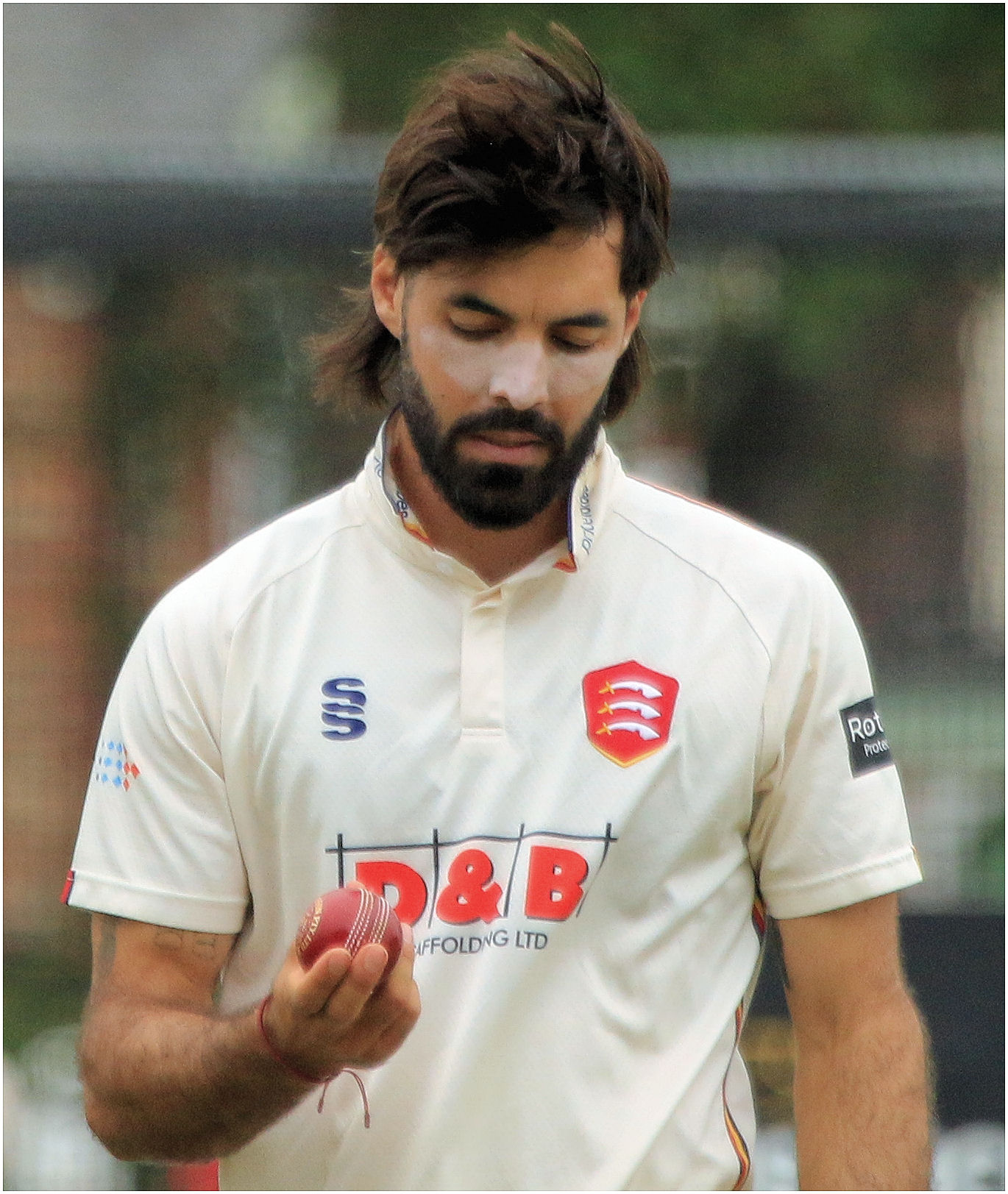
- Snater in 2025

Personal information
- Full name: Shane Snater
- Born: 24 March 1996 (age 30); Harare, Zimbabwe
- Batting: Right-handed
- Bowling: Right-arm medium
- Role: Bowler
- Relatives: Jason Roy (cousin)

International information
- National side: Netherlands (2016–2022)
- ODI debut (cap 64): 1 August 2018 v Nepal
- Last ODI: 19 June 2022 v England
- T20I debut (cap 42): 12 June 2018 v Ireland
- Last T20I: 26 October 2019 v Bermuda

Domestic team information
- Years: Team
- 2018–present: Essex (squad no. 29)
- 2020: Southern Rocks

Career statistics
Competition	ODI	T20I	FC	LA
Matches	4	13	71	46
Runs scored	33	18	1,591	346
Batting average	11.00	3.60	20.39	13.84
100s/50s	0/0	0/0	0/8	0/1
Top score	17*	10	83*	64
Balls bowled	150	209	9,675	2,104
Wickets	2	13	203	60
Bowling average	94.00	25.92	24.50	31.86
5 wickets in innings	0	0	8	2
10 wickets in match	0	0	0	0
Best bowling	1/41	3/42	7/98	5/29
Catches/stumpings	5/–	2/–	19/–	18/–
- Source: Cricinfo, 16 September 2026

Shane Snater (born 24 March 1996) is a Zimbabwean-born Dutch cricketer. He made his first-class debut for the Netherlands against Afghanistan in the 2015–17 ICC Intercontinental Cup on 29 July 2016. He made his List A debut against Hong Kong in the 2015–17 ICC World Cricket League Championship on 18 February 2017.

== Domestic career ==
Snater joined Essex County Cricket Club in 2018. He played one match for Kent in 2019 after the county suffered a number of injuries to bowlers ahead of a friendly match against the touring Pakistanis.

In December 2020, he was selected to play for the Southern Rocks in the 2020–21 Logan Cup. In Southern Rocks' first match of the tournament, Snater took eight wickets, including a five-wicket haul in the first innings.

== International career ==
In April 2017, he was named in a 24-man training squad for the Netherlands, ahead of a tour by Zimbabwe to the Netherlands. In June 2017, he was included in the squad for the series.

In June 2018, he was named in the Netherlands' Twenty20 International (T20I) squad for the 2018 Netherlands Tri-Nation Series. He made his T20I debut for the Netherlands against Ireland on 12 June 2018.

In July 2018, he was named in the Netherlands' One Day International (ODI) squad, for their series against Nepal. He made his ODI debut for the Netherlands against Nepal on 1 August 2018.

In September 2019, he was named in the Dutch squad for the 2019 ICC T20 World Cup Qualifier tournament in the United Arab Emirates. In September 2021, Snater was named as one of two reserve players in the Dutch squad for the 2021 ICC Men's T20 World Cup.

== Personal life ==
He is the cousin of Surrey and England opening batsman Jason Roy.
