= Pim van Liemt =

Dutch cricketer and umpire

Personal information
- Born: 22 March 1964 (age 62); Haarlem, Netherlands
- Role: Umpire

Umpiring information
- ODIs umpired: 1 (2019)
- T20Is umpired: 18 (2018–2024)
- WODIs umpired: 1 (2023)
- WT20Is umpired: 25 (2018–2025)
- Source: Cricinfo, 28 July 2021

Pim van Liemt (born 22 March 1964) is a Dutch cricket umpire and former cricketer, who serves as a member of the ICC Associate and Affiliate International Umpires Panel. He was shortlisted as the Koninklijke Nederlandse Cricket Bond Umpire of the Year in 2014, and won the award in 2015. He umpired in the 2016 ICC World Cricket League Division Five, and the 2018 ICC Women's World Twenty20 Qualifier.

On 13 June 2018, he stood in his first Twenty20 International (T20I) match, between the Netherlands and Ireland. On 21 June 2019, he stood in his first One Day International (ODI) match, between the Netherlands and Zimbabwe.

In his playing career, van Liemt played one match for Netherlands U-19 against Bermuda U-19; opening the batting, van Liemt scored 20.

== See also ==
- List of One Day International cricket umpires
- List of Twenty20 International cricket umpires
