= Bas de Leede =

Dutch cricketer (born 1999)

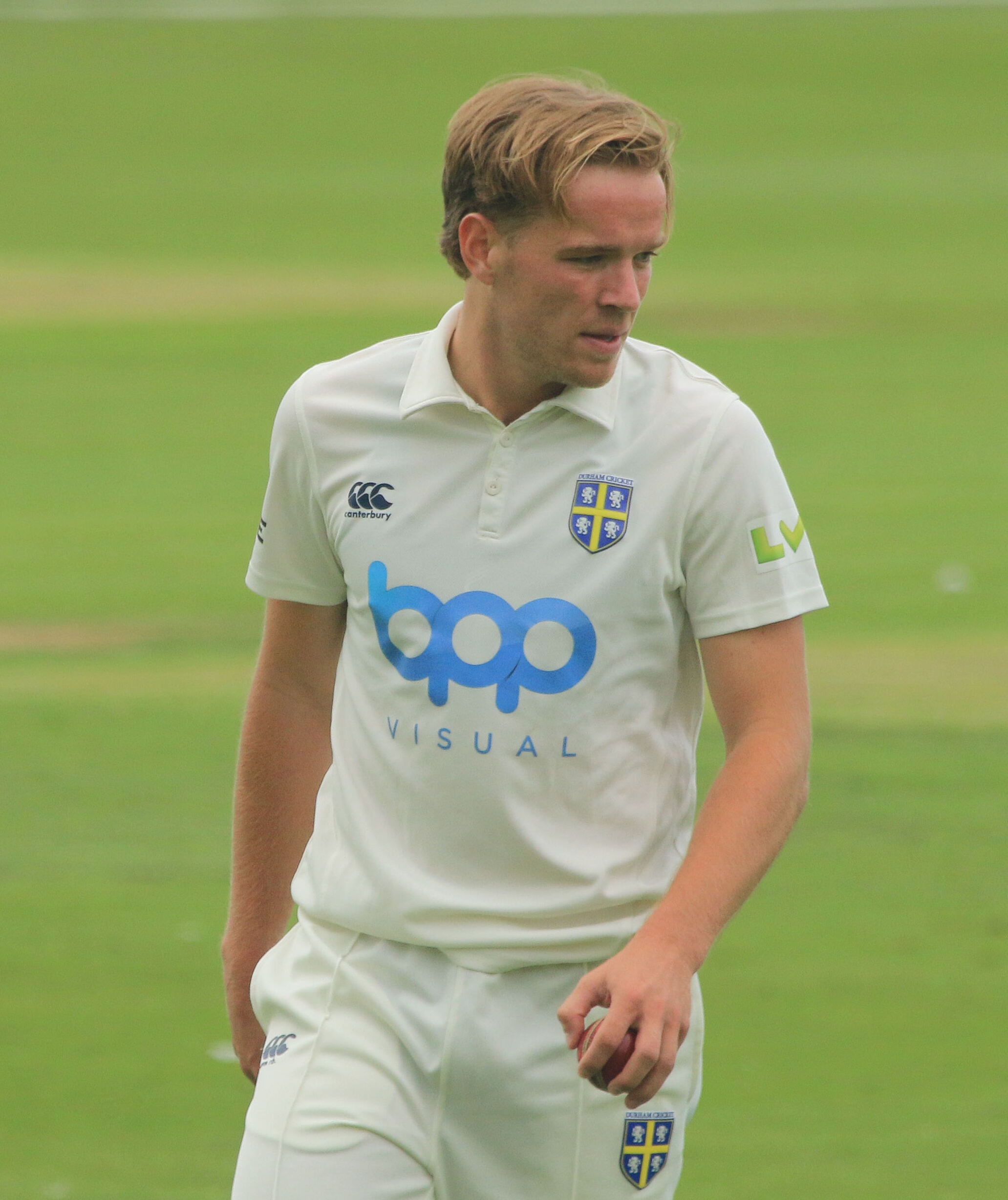
- De Leede bowling for Durham in 2023

Personal information
- Full name: Bastiaan Franciscus Wilhelmus de Leede
- Born: 15 November 1999 (age 26); Nootdorp, Netherlands
- Batting: Right-handed
- Bowling: Right-arm medium
- Role: Batting Allrounder
- Relatives: Tim de Leede (father); Babette de Leede (cousin)

International information
- National side: Netherlands (2018–present)
- ODI debut (cap 61): 1 August 2018 v Nepal
- Last ODI: 31 July 2026 v Namibia
- ODI shirt no.: 5
- T20I debut (cap 38): 12 June 2018 v Ireland
- Last T20I: 18 February 2026 v India
- T20I shirt no.: 5

Domestic team information
- Years: Team
- 2023: MI Emirates
- 2023–2025: Durham
- 2023: Northern Superchargers
- 2024: Desert Vipers
- 2026: Amsterdam Flames

Career statistics
Competition	ODI	T20I	FC	LA
Matches	61	49	18	77
Runs scored	1,420	881	604	1,722
Batting average	28.40	27.53	31.78	26.90
100s/50s	1/7	0/5	1/4	1/8
Top score	123	91*	103	123
Balls bowled	1,521	644	1,851	2,005
Wickets	45	44	34	58
Bowling average	33.31	19.43	35.82	33.98
5 wickets in innings	1	0	0	1
10 wickets in match	0	0	0	0
Best bowling	5/52	3/17	4/76	5/52
Catches/stumpings	29/–	23/–	8/–	32/–
- Source: Cricinfo, 31 July 2026

Bastiaan Franciscus Wilhelmus de Leede (born 15 November 1999) is a Dutch cricketer. He comes from a cricketing family and his father, Tim de Leede, too played for the Netherlands, in 29 One Day Internationals (ODIs).

== Career ==
He made his List A debut for Royal Netherlands Cricket Board XI (KNCB XI) during the Netherlands tour of Zimbabwe on 29 September 2017. He made his first-class debut for the Netherlands against Namibia in the 2015–17 ICC Intercontinental Cup on 29 November 2017.

In February 2018, he was added to the Netherlands squad for the 2018 Cricket World Cup Qualifier, after Stephan Myburgh was ruled out of the tournament due to an injury. In June 2018, he was named in the Netherlands' Twenty20 International (T20I) squad for the 2018 Netherlands Tri-Nation Series.

He made his T20I debut for the Netherlands against Ireland on 12 June 2018. In July 2018, he was named in the Netherlands' One Day International (ODI) squad, for their series against Nepal. He made his ODI debut against Nepal on 1 August 2018.

In July 2019, he was selected to play for the Rotterdam Rhinos in the inaugural edition of the Euro T20 Slam cricket tournament. However, the following month the tournament was cancelled.

In September 2021, De Leede was named in the Dutch squad for the 2021 ICC Men's T20 World Cup.

In August 2022, it was announced that De Leede would be playing for the MI Emirates team in the new ILT20 competition. In January 2024 he switched to the Desert Vipers to play in the ILT20.

On January 24 he was announced Associate Men's Cricketer of the Year 2023 by the ICC.

=== 2023 Cricket World Cup Qualifiers ===
In July 2023, de Leede took his maiden five-wicket haul in ODI cricket, finishing with figures of 5/52 and scored his first ODI century against Scotland in the World Cup Qualifier (including four sixes in the space of two overs) to help Netherlands qualify for the World Cup in India later that year. His all-round exploits and heroics came in do-or-die contest against Scotland as both Dutch and Scottish teams were eyeing for the final spot to qualify for the World Cup in India and for his performance, he received the Player of the Match award. His 5/52 restricted Scotland to 277 on the board and the Netherlands were required to chase down the target of 278 within 44 overs in order to edge past Scotland's net run rate to book their World Cup berth. Bas de Leede came into bat at number 4 position, especially at a critical juncture as far as the Dutch were concerned keeping in mind about the target to chase. He smashed a quickfire 123 off just 92 deliveries which gave a glimmer of hope for the Dutch side in their run chase in a must win match. de Leede was run out when the Dutch were on the brink of a victory. He eventually became the first Dutch cricketer and fourth player in the world in men's ODIs to score a century and take a fifer in a same ODI match after Viv Richards, Paul Collingwood and Rohan Mustafa. He also became the first player ever to complete the double of taking a fifer and scoring 120 runs in an ODI match.

=== 2023 Cricket World Cup ===
He was named in Dutch squad for the 2023 Cricket World Cup and it also marked his debut World Cup appearance. In his team's first World Cup game against Pakistan, he returned figures of 4/62 before making 67 runs with the bat, which included a 70-run partnership with Vikramjit Singh, in a lost cause. Along with father Tim (who played in 1996, 2003 and 2007 World Cup editions), Bas de Leede became the seventh father-son duo to feature in World Cups. Bas de Leede became the first player in ODI history to complete the unique distinction of scoring 50+ and taking 5 wicket haul in consecutive ODI matches when he achieved the milestone against Pakistan. He also equaled his father Tim's feat of taking a four wicket haul in a World Cup match and became the first father-son duo to have captured a four wicket haul in World Cup matches. He also became the fourth player in World Cup history to have scored 60+ runs and to have taken a four wicket haul in a same World Cup match after Duncan Fletcher, Feiko Kloppenburg and Tillakaratne Dilshan.

In October 2023, during Netherlands group stage match against Australia, de Leede conceded the most runs by a bowler in an ODI match after returning with figures of 2/115 in his quota of 10 overs. His expensive bowling figures were as a result of a late onslaught by Australian middle order batsman Glenn Maxwell who braced his way to score the fastest ever century in Cricket World Cup history which came off just 40 deliveries. Bas de Leede set the unwanted record during the 49th over of the Australia's innings when he conceded 28 runs bowling to Maxwell and de Leede eventually surpassed the worst bowling figures in ODI cricket previously held by Adam Zampa and Mick Lewis.

During Netherlands last group stage match against hosts India, Bas de Leede became the all-time highest wicket-taker for the Netherlands in Cricket World Cup history when he dismissed Indian captain Rohit Sharma with 15 scalps. He also set the record for the Dutch for having taken the most number of wickets in a single edition of the World Cup.

In May 2024, he was named in the Netherlands squad for the 2024 ICC Men's T20 World Cup tournament.
