= Huub Jansen =

Dutch cricket umpire (born 1962)

Personal information
- Full name: Hubertus Karel Gerardus Jansen
- Born: 30 September 1962 (age 64)
- Role: Umpire

Umpiring information
- ODIs umpired: 3 (2018–2019)
- T20Is umpired: 8 (2018–2019)
- WT20Is umpired: 5 (2019)
- Source: Cricinfo, 8 August 2019

Hubertus Karel Gerardus "Huub" Jansen (born 30 September 1962) is a Dutch former cricket umpire. Jansen served on the ICC Associate and Affiliate Panel of Umpires representing the Netherlands. He retired from umpiring in September 2021.

== Umpiring career ==
Jansen officiated in matches during the 2016 ICC World Cricket League Division Five tournament in Jersey in May 2016.

On 16 June 2018, he made his Twenty20 International (T20I) umpiring debut, in a match between Ireland and Scotland. On 3 August 2018, he umpired in his first One Day International (ODI) match, between the Netherlands and Nepal. He was one of the eight on-field umpires for the 2019 ICC World Cricket League Division Two tournament in Namibia.

== See also ==
- List of One Day International cricket umpires
- List of Twenty20 International cricket umpires
