= VRA Amsterdam Cricket Ground =

Sports ground in the Netherlands

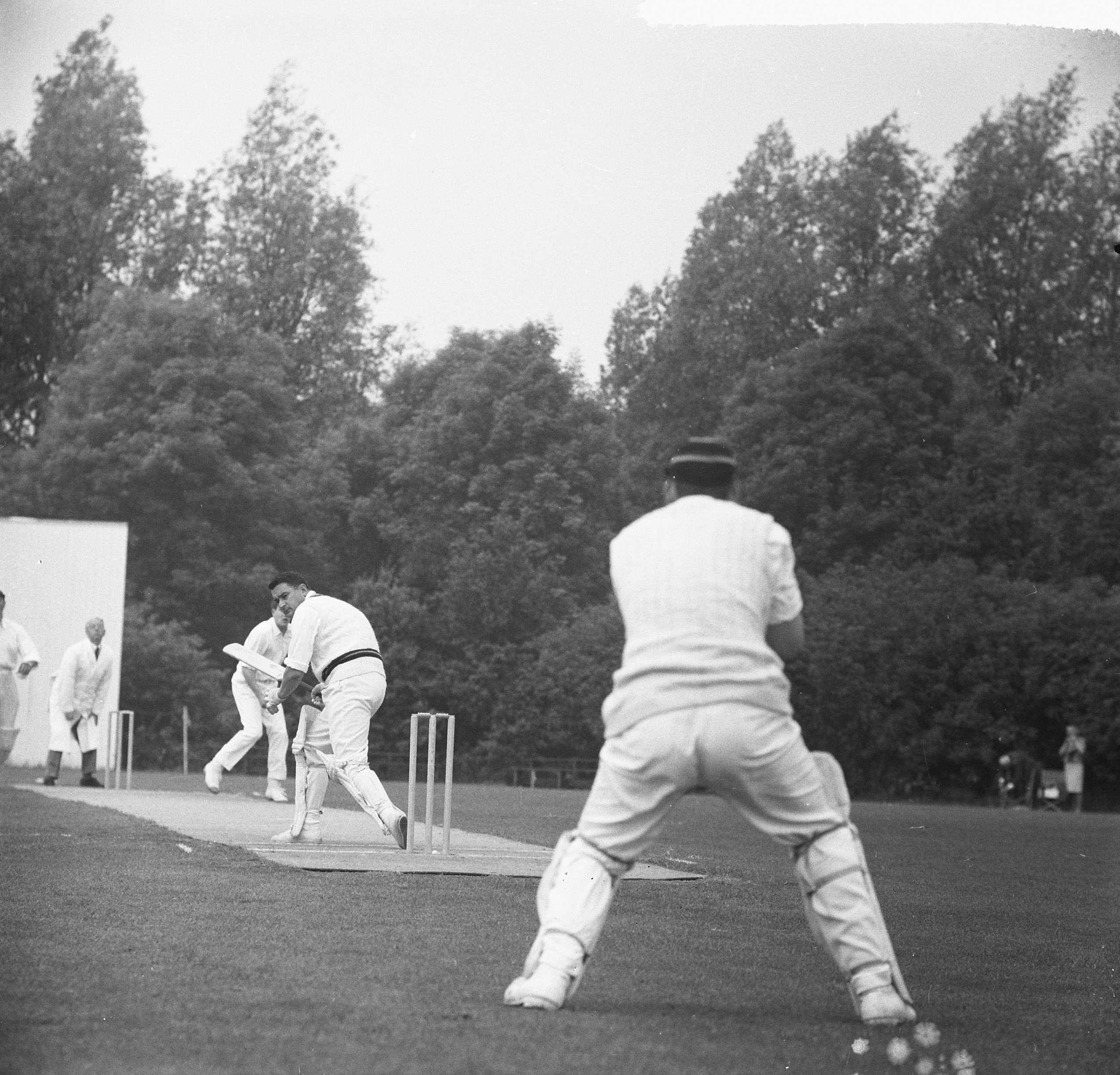
- VRA Amsterdam Cricket Ground during a match in 1965
- Interactive map of VRA Amsterdam Cricket Ground

Ground information
- Location: Amstelveen
- Country: Netherlands
- Coordinates: 52°19′10″N 4°50′57″E
- End names
- City End; Mulder's End

International information
- First men's ODI: 26 May 1999: Kenya v South Africa
- Last men's ODI: 10 May 2025: Netherlands v Scotland
- First men's T20I: 30 June 2015: Netherlands v Nepal
- Last men's T20I: 5 August 2019: Netherlands v United Arab Emirates
- First women's ODI: 26 June 2002: Netherlands v New Zealand
- Last women's ODI: 12 August 2024: Netherlands v Scotland
- First women's T20I: 7 July 2018: Scotland v Uganda
- Last women's T20I: 16 August 2024: Netherlands v Scotland

Team information
Netherlands
VRA Amsterdam	(1939 – present)
- As of 17 August 2023; Source: Ground profile Ground Profile CricketArchive

VRA Amsterdam Cricket Ground is a cricket ground in Amstelveen, Netherlands, the home of VRA Amsterdam since 1939. It regularly plays host to the Netherlands home games in the World Cricket League, Intercontinental Cup and CB40.

This ground was first used for international cricket when the Netherlands played Denmark in 1963. It has hosted many One Day Internationals (ODIs) including a match in the 1999 Cricket World Cup, and the 2004 Videocon Cup between India, Pakistan and Australia. It was also used in the 1990 ICC Trophy, the first to be played outside England.

VRA Cricket Ground has hosted some notable moments in Dutch cricket, including a three-run win for the Netherlands over an England XI that featured future England captains Alec Stewart and Nasser Hussain in 1989. In July 2006, the Netherlands played Sri Lanka in their first home ODI and the visitors scored 443/9 from their 50 overs, which then was the highest team total in ODI cricket.

Located in Amsterdamse Bos, the main ground features a AAA standard turf wicket, while the second and third grounds have an artificial wicket and are used in the winter by Amsterdamsche Hockey & Bandy Club.

The stadium hosted a One Day International (ODI) match during the 1999 Cricket World Cup, between South Africa and Kenya. It hosted Nepal's first ever ODI during their Netherlands tour in August 2018.

England scored 498 runs against the Netherlands in June 2022, setting a new record for the highest-ever ODI team score.

== List of centuries ==
=== One Day Internationals ===
No.	Score	Player	Team	Balls	Inns.	Opposing team	Date	Result
1	157	Sanath Jayasuriya	Sri Lanka	104	1	Netherlands	4 July 2006	Sri Lanka won
2	117*	Tillakaratne Dilshan	Sri Lanka	78	1	Netherlands	4 July 2006	Sri Lanka won
3	110	Mohammad Shahzad	Afghanistan	111	2	Netherlands	1 September 2009	Afghanistan won
4	150*	JP Duminy	South Africa	122	1	Netherlands	31 May 2013	South Africa won
5	119*	Shai Hope	West Indies	130	1	Netherlands	31 May 2022	West Indies won
6	120	Kyle Mayers	West Indies	106	1	Netherlands	4 June 2022	West Indies won
7	101*	Shamarh Brooks	West Indies	115	1	Netherlands	4 June 2022	West Indies won
8	122	Phil Salt	England	93	1	Netherlands	17 June 2022	England won
9	125	Dawid Malan	England	109	1	Netherlands	17 June 2022	England won
10	162*	Jos Buttler	England	70	1	Netherlands	17 June 2022	England won
11	101*	Jason Roy	England	86	2	Netherlands	22 June 2022	England won

Women's matches
No.	Score	Player	Team	Balls	Inns.	Opposing team	Date	Result
1	137	Leah Paul	Ireland	138	1	Netherlands	24 August 2022	Ireland won
2	109	Laura Delany	Ireland	102	1	Netherlands	24 August 2022	Ireland won

== List of five-wicket hauls ==
=== One Day Internationals ===
Men's matches
No.	Bowler	Date	Team	Opposing team	Inn	Overs	Runs	Wkts	Result
1	Lance Klusener	26 May 1999	South Africa	Kenya	1	8.3	21	5	South Africa won

Women's matches
No.	Bowler	Date	Team	Opposing team	Inn	Overs	Runs	Wkts	Result
1	Cara Murray	24 August 2022	Ireland	Netherlands	2	10.0	39	5	Ireland won
