= Roelof van der Merwe =

Dutch-South African cricketer

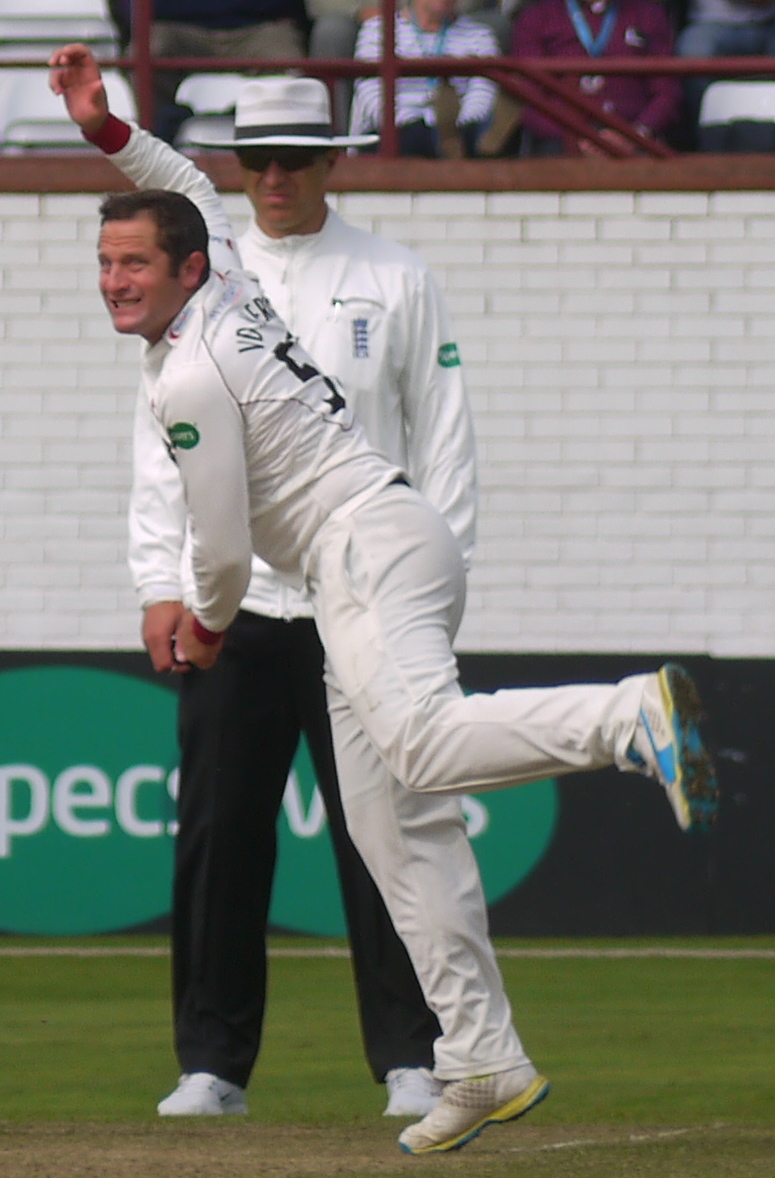
- Van der Merwe bowling for Somerset in 2016

Personal information
- Full name: Roelof Erasmus van der Merwe
- Born: 31 December 1984 (age 41); Johannesburg, Transvaal Province, South Africa
- Nickname: The Bulldog, Terminator
- Batting: Right-handed
- Bowling: Slow left-arm orthodox
- Role: Bowling-all rounder

International information
- National sides: South Africa (2009–2011); Netherlands (2015–present)
- ODI debut (cap 96/67): 5 April 2009; South Africa v Australia
- Last ODI: 31 July 2026; Netherlands v Namibia
- ODI shirt no.: 52
- T20I debut (cap 41/35): 29 March 2009; South Africa v Australia
- Last T20I: 18 February 2026; Netherlands v India
- T20I shirt no.: 52

Domestic team information
- Years: Team
- 2006/07–2013/14: Northerns
- 2007/08–2014/15: Titans
- 2009–2010: Royal Challengers Bangalore
- 2011–2013: Delhi Daredevils
- 2011: Somerset
- 2011/12: Brisbane Heat
- 2014: St Lucia Zouks
- 2016–2024: Somerset
- 2019: Tshwane Spartans
- 2021: London Spirit
- 2022: Northern Superchargers
- 2022/23: Sunrisers Eastern Cape
- 2023: Welsh Fire
- 2023: Barbados Royals
- 2024: Dubai Capitals
- 2024/25: Titans
- 2026: Rotterdam Dockers

Career statistics
Competition	ODI	T20I	FC	LA
Matches	46	71	80	228
Runs scored	345	575	3,588	3,212
Batting average	14.37	21.29	32.03	24.89
100s/50s	0/1	0/2	6/22	1/11
Top score	57	75*	205*	165*
Balls bowled	2,254	1,339	10,252	10,115
Wickets	54	75	150	301
Bowling average	31.61	19.74	33.79	26.72
5 wickets in innings	0	0	1	4
10 wickets in match	0	0	0	0
Best bowling	3/14	4/35	5/174	5/26
Catches/stumpings	16/–	30/–	61/–	95/–
- Source: ESPNcricinfo, 31 July 2026

Roelof Erasmus van der Merwe (born 31 December 1984) is a Dutch-South African professional cricketer who has played internationally for both South Africa and the Netherlands, one of the few players to represent more than one international team.

Born in Johannesburg, Van der Merwe made his first-class and List A debuts for Northerns during the 2006–07 season, before moving into franchise cricket with Titans the following season. An all-rounder, he bowls left-arm orthodox spin and is a right-handed middle-order batsman. He played One Day International (ODI) and Twenty20 International (T20I) cricket for South Africa between 2009 and 2011, playing 13 times in each format. Van der Merwe gained a Dutch passport in June 2015, and was selected in the Netherlands squad for the 2015 ICC World Twenty20 Qualifier.

== Personal life ==
Van der Merwe was born on 31 December 1984 in Johannesburg, South Africa. He holds Dutch citizenship by descent through his mother.

== Domestic career ==
Van der Merwe began his career as a wicketkeeper-batsman, representing the South Africa national under-19 cricket team in that capacity at the 2004 Under-19 Cricket World Cup in Bangladesh.

Van der Merwe made his List A debut in October 2006 for Northerns against North West. He was dismissed for a duck and bowled his full allocation of nine overs conceding 29 runs. In December 2006, he made his first-class debut for Northerns against Limpopo. where he bowled 12 wicketless overs but scored 36 runs and took three catches.

Van der Merwe had a successful 2007–08 season, moving into franchise cricket with the Titans. He made his debut for Titans in the SuperSport Series in November 2007 against the Eagles. His first one-day appearance for them came in February 2008 against Zimbabwe he claimed four wickets conceding 24 runs (4/24). He finished the MTN Domestic Championship as Titans leading wicket-taker with 27 wickets at an average of 14.25. He also scored 269 runs at 29.88. In the Standard Bank Pro20 Series which followed van der Merwe was the third leading wicket-taker with 13 victims at 13.92, he also contributed 192 runs at 27.42. Titans won both 50-over and 20-over competitions and for Van der Merwe's part in it he was awarded Player of the Year, MTN Domestic Championship Player of the Year, Standard Bank Pro20 Series Player of the Year and the Newcomer of the Year at the team's end of season award. On a national level he was selected Domestic Newcomer of the Year at the SA Cricket Awards.

Titans retained the MTN Domestic Championship in 2008/09 with Van der Merwe again being instrumental to the success, he took 30 wickets at 13.96, 14 more than any other bowler.

Having switched his allegiance to the Netherlands, Van der Merwe signed for Somerset on a two-year contract to play county cricket ahead of the 2016 season. In April 2017, he scored his maiden List A century, making 165 not out against Surrey in the 2017 Royal London One-Day Cup.

In July 2022, he took his maiden five-wicket haul in first-class cricket, against Lancashire in the County Championship.

=== Club cricket ===
In 2007 Van der Merwe played for Monton & Weaste in the Central Lancashire League before he was released mid season after the club realised he was not eligible for amateur status, having played first-class cricket the previous winter. He has also represented Stretford, in 2006 he scored a league record 1200 runs at 80 as well as taking 53 wickets at 11.26.

=== T20 cricket ===
In July 2019, he was selected to play for the Amsterdam Knights in the inaugural edition of the Euro T20 Slam cricket tournament. However, the following month the tournament was cancelled. In September 2019, he was named in the squad for the Tshwane Spartans team for the 2019 Mzansi Super League tournament.

In April 2022, he was bought by the Northern Superchargers for the 2022 season of The Hundred in England.

== International career ==
Van der Merwe was selected in the South Africa team for the 2004 U-19 Cricket World Cup. He played five matches, scoring 129 runs and taking 3 wickets. Following the tournament, it was over two years before he made his first-class debut and Van der Merwe has admitted he "didn't take things too seriously" and was "partying all the time".

In August 2008 Van der Merwe was selected for the South Africa Academy to play against their Bangladesh equivalents, in the second of a five-match series he scored 79 from 70 balls and took 6/52.

Van der Merwe played in the 2008 Hong Kong International Cricket Sixes, he was South Africa's leading run scorer and wicket-taker.

=== South Africa ===
Van der Merwe was selected in the South Africa Twenty20 squad for their two Twenty20 Internationals against Australia in March 2009. In the second of these, he made his full debut, top scoring with 48 from 30 balls, an innings that included four sixes. He also took a maiden international wicket of David Hussey in that contest and was awarded man of the match. After this performance he was added to the squad for the One Day International series as cover for Jacques Kallis. Van der Merwe made his ODI debut in the second match of the series at SuperSport Park, he bowled five wicketless overs and was not required to bat. He had a more prominent role in his second ODI, he scored his maiden ODI runs with a six and took 3/37 from his allotted ten overs. In the final two matches he claimed five more wickets to finish his maiden ODI series with eight at 18.62.

=== Netherlands ===
In 2015, Van der Merwe secured a Dutch passport and was selected to play against Nepal in a four-match series. He was also selected for the 2015 World T20 Qualifier after Vivian Kingma pulled out. He made his T20I debut for the Netherlands against Nepal on 3 July 2015 and became the 5th cricketer to represent two international teams in T20Is. He was also part of the Netherlands squad for the 2016 ICC World Twenty20.

In June 2019, he was named in the Netherlands' One Day International (ODI) squad for their series against Zimbabwe. He made his ODI debut for the Netherlands against Zimbabwe on 19 June 2019. He became the 12th cricketer to represent two international teams in ODIs.

In September 2019, he was named in the Dutch squad for the 2019 ICC T20 World Cup Qualifier tournament in the United Arab Emirates. In September 2021, he was part of the Dutch squad for the 2021 ICC Men's T20 World Cup. in 2023, he was selected to play in the 50-over Cricket World Cup in India. In the Netherlands win over South Africa at the 2023 Cricket World Cup, he played a vital cameo of 29 runs off 19 balls while taking two wickets for 34 runs in his nine-over spell.

== See also ==
- List of cricketers who have played for two international teams
