= Fred Klaassen =

Dutch cricketer (born 1992)

Personal information
- Full name: Frederick Jack Klaassen
- Born: 13 November 1992 (age 33); Haywards Heath, West Sussex, England
- Height: 6 ft 4 in (1.93 m)
- Batting: Right-handed
- Bowling: Left-arm medium-fast
- Role: Bowler

International information
- National side: Netherlands
- ODI debut (cap 63): 1 August 2018 v Nepal
- Last ODI: 16 May 2025 v Scotland
- ODI shirt no.: 12
- T20I debut (cap 40): 12 June 2018 v Ireland
- Last T20I: 13 February 2026 v United States
- T20I shirt no.: 12

Domestic team information
- Years: Team
- 2018: VOC Rotterdam
- 2019–: Kent (squad no. 18)
- 2021–2022: Manchester Originals
- 2026: Belfast Wolves

Career statistics
Competition	ODI	T20I	FC	LA
Matches	20	41	5	44
Runs scored	79	48	45	170
Batting average	9.87	4.36	9.00	10.62
100s/50s	0/0	0/0	0/0	0/0
Top score	13	13	14*	17*
Balls bowled	1,107	840	689	2189
Wickets	32	45	9	64
Bowling average	25.40	23.66	46.88	29.32
5 wickets in innings	0	1	0	0
10 wickets in match	0	0	0	0
Best bowling	3/23	5/19	4/44	3/23
Catches/stumpings	6/–	17/–	3/–	16/–
- Source: CricInfo, 18 February 2026

Frederick Jack Klaassen (born 13 November 1992) is an English-born Dutch international cricketer who plays for Kent County Cricket Club. He made his List A debut for the Netherlands against Zimbabwe on 24 June 2017, having played club cricket in England and New Zealand.

== Early life ==
Klaassen was born in Haywards Heath in West Sussex. He grew up in Hamilton, New Zealand and in Australia and was educated at Sacred Heart College, Auckland. He qualified to play for the Netherlands through a Dutch grandfather.

== Cricket career ==
In June 2018, he was named in the Netherlands' Twenty20 International (T20I) squad for the 2018 Netherlands Tri-Nation Series. He made his T20I debut for the Netherlands against Ireland on 12 June 2018.

In July 2018, he was named in the Netherlands' One Day International (ODI) squad, for their series against Nepal. He made his ODI debut for the Netherlands against Nepal on 1 August 2018, taking 3/30 on debut. In December he was named in the squad for the 2018–19 Oman Quadrangular Series, playing in all three of the Netherlands' matches during the tournament.

On 1 October 2018 Klaassen signed a two-year contract with English county team Kent County Cricket Club. He had played for the county Second XI in friendly matches during the previous English season and against Kent in warm up matches ahead of the 2018 t20 Blast competition. He made his first-class debut on 31 March 2019 for Kent against Loughborough MCCU, as part of the Marylebone Cricket Club University fixtures.

In Dutch domestic cricket Klaassen has played for VOC Rotterdam, winning the Topklasse, the Dutch domestic title, with the club in 2018. He was the leading bowler in the competition during the 2018 season, taking 29 wickets at an average of 14.10 runs per wicket. In 2015 he played in New Zealand for Cornwall Cricket Club and in Scotland for East Kilbride Cricket Club and later played for Norwich Cricket Club in the East Anglian Premier Cricket League Klaassen made 22 appearances, mainly in limited-overs matches, for Kent during th 2019 season and signed a contract extension with the club in January 2020, keeping him at Kent until 2022. In the 2018/19 northern hemisphere winter he played in Australia for Monash Tigers in Victorian Premier Cricket.

Klaassen played in the 2019 ICC T20 World Cup Qualifier tournament in the United Arab Emirates and in September 2021, was named in the Dutch squad for the 2021 ICC Men's T20 World Cup.

In April 2022, he was bought by the Manchester Originals for the 2022 season of The Hundred.

Having not made an appearance for the club in 2024 due to a back injury sustained on international duty, Klaassen signed a new one-year white-ball contract with Kent in December 2024. He agreed a further deal with the club in January 2026, tying him into them until the end of the 2027 season.
