= Rizwan Akram =

Cricket umpire

Personal information
- Full name: Rizwan Akram
- Born: 26 September 1979 (age 47); Amsterdam, Netherlands
- Role: Umpire

Umpiring information
- ODIs umpired: 17 (2018–2025)
- T20Is umpired: 53 (2018–2024)
- WODIs umpired: 1 (2023)
- WT20Is umpired: 32 (2021–2026)
- Source: Cricinfo, 21 August 2022

Rizwan Akram (born 26 September 1979) is a Dutch cricket umpire and former cricketer. In April 2018, he was appointed to the International Cricket Council's (ICC) Panel of Development Umpires. He was one of the umpires for the 2018 Netherlands Tri-Nation Series. On 12 June 2018, he made his Twenty20 International (T20I) umpiring debut, in a match between the Netherlands and Ireland. On 1 August 2018, he stood in his first One Day International (ODI) match, when the visiting Nepal and the Netherlands played in Amstelveen.

He was one of the on-field umpires for the 2022 ICC Under-19 Cricket World Cup in the West Indies. He had umpired in 45 ODIs and T20Is by August 2021.

== See also ==
- List of One Day International cricket umpires
- List of Twenty20 International cricket umpires
