= Stephan Myburgh =

Dutch-South African cricketer

Personal information
- Full name: Stephanus Johannes Myburgh
- Born: 28 February 1984 (age 42); Pretoria, Transvaal Province, South Africa
- Batting: Left-handed
- Bowling: Right-arm off break
- Role: Batsman
- Relatives: Johann Myburgh (brother)

International information
- National side: Netherlands (2011–2022)
- ODI debut (cap 54): 12 September 2011 v Kenya
- Last ODI: 4 April 2022 v New Zealand
- ODI shirt no.: 97
- T20I debut (cap 23): 13 March 2012 v Canada
- Last T20I: 6 November 2022 v South Africa
- T20I shirt no.: 97

Domestic team information
- Years: Team
- 2005/06–2009/10: Northerns
- 2011/12: KwaZulu-Natal Inland

Career statistics
Competition	ODI	T20I	FC	LA
Matches	22	45	23	97
Runs scored	527	915	760	2,673
Batting average	26.35	21.178	21.71	29.70
100s/50s	0/4	0/5	0/3	1/18
Top score	74	71*	85	105
Balls bowled	–	–	60	76
Wickets	–	–	0	2
Bowling average	–	–	–	27.50
5 wickets in innings	–	–	–	0
10 wickets in match	–	–	–	0
Best bowling	–	–	–	2/30
Catches/stumpings	4/–	10/–	19/–	16/–
- Source: ESPNCricinfo, 6 November 2022

Stephanus Johannes Myburgh (born 28 February 1984) is a Dutch-South African cricketer who has played at One Day International (ODI) and Twenty20 International (T20I) level for the Netherlands national side. He is a left-handed batsman and right-arm offbreak bowler.

== International career ==
During the 2014 ICC World Twenty20, Myburgh showcased what he can do in each match that Dutch played. On 21 March 2014 against Ireland, Myburgh equalled the record of the second-fastest fifty in Twenty20 International with Paul Stirling of Ireland. He scored the fifty with 17 balls, where Dutch required to win the game in 14 overs to qualify for the Super 10 stage. With blistering innings by Myburgh, Netherlands won the match in 13.5 overs with 6 wickets remaining. Myburgh was adjudged man of the match as well.

He was the third highest run scorer in the tournament after Virat Kohli and fellow Dutch Tom Cooper with 224 runs in 7 T20I matches. He scored 3 fifties in the tournament with average of 32.00 and amazing strike rate of 154.48. Myburgh is the highest boundary maker of the tournament as well, with 26 fours and 13 sixes. He was named in the 'Team of the Tournament' for the 2014 T20 World Cup by the ICC and Cricinfo.

In July 2018, he was named in the Netherlands' One Day International (ODI) squad, for their series against Nepal. In April 2020, he was one of seventeen Dutch-based cricketers to be named in the team's senior squad. In September 2021, Myburgh was named in the Dutch squad for the 2021 ICC Men's T20 World Cup.

== T20 career ==
In August 2017, he was named in Pretoria Mavericks' squad for the first season of the T20 Global League. However, in October 2017, Cricket South Africa initially postponed the tournament until November 2018, with it being cancelled soon after.

In July 2019, he was selected to play for the Rotterdam Rhinos in the inaugural edition of the Euro T20 Slam cricket tournament. However, the following month the tournament was cancelled.

Stephan Myburgh retired from ODI cricket following the 2022 series against New Zealand.
