= Wesley Barresi =

Dutch cricketer (born 1984)

Personal information
- Full name: Wesley Barresi
- Born: 3 May 1984 (age 42); Johannesburg, Transvaal, South Africa
- Batting: Right-handed
- Bowling: Right-arm off break
- Role: Wicket-keeper

International information
- National side: Netherlands (2009–2024)
- ODI debut (cap 45): 1 July 2010 v Scotland
- Last ODI: 12 June 2025 v Scotland
- ODI shirt no.: 34 (formerly 2)
- T20I debut (cap 21): 13 March 2012 v Canada
- Last T20I: 24 May 2024 v Ireland
- T20I shirt no.: 34

Domestic team information
- Years: Team
- 2004/05–2005/06: Easterns

Career statistics
Competition	ODI	T20I	FC	LA
Matches	55	46	22	138
Runs scored	1,352	812	676	3,348
Batting average	27.52	21.94	16.09	27.44
100s/50s	1/8	0/4	0/3	2/21
Top score	137*	75*	81	137*
Catches/stumpings	26/8	28/1	37/4	95/16
- Source: ESPNcricinfo, 14 June 2025

Wesley Barresi (born 3 May 1984) is a South African-born Dutch cricketer who plays for the Netherlands cricket team. He has represented the Netherlands national cricket team since 2009, playing as a right-handed top-order batsman and occasional wicket-keeper. He was part of the Netherlands team that played in the 2011 and 2023 Cricket World Cups.

== Personal life ==
Barresi was born on 3 May 1984 in Johannesburg, South Africa.

== Domestic and franchise career ==
Barresi played for Easterns in the South African provincial system, and was also named in a Titans academy squad during the 2002–03 season. He made his first-class debut for Easterns against Northerns in 2004.

Initially intending to pursue a career in England, Barresi spent the 2005 Dutch season with Hilversumsche Cricket Club. He later switched to VRA Amsterdam and settled in the Netherlands, qualifying for national selection after meeting ICC residency requirements in 2009.

In July 2019, Barresi was selected to play for the Amsterdam Knights in the inaugural edition of the Euro T20 Slam cricket tournament. However, the following month, the tournament was cancelled.

== International career ==
Barresi made his international debut for the Netherlands in July 2009 against Canada in the 2009–10 ICC Intercontinental Cup. His One Day International (ODI) debut came against Scotland in July 2010, and in the same month he scored a match-winning 65 not out against Bangladesh to lead the Netherlands to its first ODI victory over an ICC full member.

At the 2011 Cricket World Cup, Barresi was used as the Netherlands' main wicket-keeper. He scored his maiden ODI century against Kenya at the 2014 Cricket World Cup Qualifier, an innings of 137 not out which set a new record for the highest ODI score for the Netherlands.

In July 2018, Barresi was named in the Netherlands' One Day International (ODI) squad, for their series against Nepal. Ahead of the ODI matches, the International Cricket Council (ICC) named him as the key player for the Netherlands.

In February 2021, Barresi announced his retirement from all forms of cricket, but returned to the national team in August 2022. In May 2024, he was named in the Netherlands squad for the 2024 ICC Men's T20 World Cup tournament.
