= Paul van Meekeren =

Dutch cricketer (born 1993)

Personal information
- Full name: Paul Adriaan van Meekeren
- Born: 15 January 1993 (age 33); Amsterdam, Netherlands
- Batting: Right-handed
- Bowling: Right-arm fast-medium
- Role: Bowler

International information
- National side: Netherlands (2013–2025)
- ODI debut (cap 57): 31 May 2013 v South Africa
- Last ODI: 12 June 2025 v Scotland
- ODI shirt no.: 47
- T20I debut (cap 28): 20 April 2013 v Kenya
- Last T20I: 7 February 2026 v Pakistan
- T20I shirt no.: 47

Domestic team information
- Years: Team
- 2016–2019: Somerset (squad no. 47)
- 2021: Durham (squad no. 47)
- 2022–2023: Gloucestershire (squad no. 47)
- 2023: Khulna Tigers
- 2024: Vancouver Knights
- 2026: Glasgow Cosmic

Career statistics
Competition	ODI	T20I	FC	LA
Matches	39	78	10	106
Runs scored	145	136	113	277
Batting average	8.52	6.80	8.69	8.14
100s/50s	0/0	0/0	0/0	0/0
Top score	21*	24	34	21*
Balls bowled	1,871	1,554	1,669	4,510
Wickets	61	86	33	147
Bowling average	27.47	21.29	31.60	27.91
5 wickets in innings	1	0	1	2
10 wickets in match	0	0	0	0
Best bowling	5/28	4/11	5/73	5/28
Catches/stumpings	7/–	24/–	3/–	28/–
- Source: ESPNcricinfo, 18 February 2026

Paul Adriaan van Meekeren (born 15 January 1993) is a Dutch cricketer who most recently played for Gloucestershire County Cricket Club. He has played domestically for Somerset and Durham in English county cricket, and for St Kitts and Nevis Patriots in T20 franchise cricket. He is a right-handed batsman and right-arm fast-medium bowler. Gloucestershire announced at the end of the 2023 season that his contract would not be renewed.

== Career ==
Van Meekeren made his T20I debut for the Netherlands in a loss against Kenya on 20 April 2013. One month later, on 31 May, he made his One Day International (ODI) debut against South Africa in a one-off ODI where he took the wicket of South African batting ace Hashim Amla. In the first round of the 2016 WT20, he bowled a match-winning spell of 4–11 against Ireland, which remain his best figures in T20I cricket today.

In July 2016, Van Meekeren signed for Somerset County Cricket Club on a short-term deal until the end of the season. He later signed a two-year deal with the club until the end of the 2018 season.

In January 2017, Van Meekeren was included in the Netherlands squad for the Inaugural Desert T20 Challenge. Against Hong Kong, he broke the record for the highest score by a number 11 batsman in Twenty20 Internationals, with 18 runs from 11 balls. He is the only person to hit multiple sixes while batting at number 11 in a Twenty20 International.

In July 2018, he was named in the Netherlands' ODI squad, for their series against Nepal. In June 2019, he was selected to play for the Winnipeg Hawks franchise team in the 2019 Global T20 Canada tournament. In July 2019, he was selected to play for the Amsterdam Knights in the inaugural edition of the Euro T20 Slam cricket tournament. However, the following month the tournament was cancelled.

In September 2019, he was named in the Dutch squad for the 2019 ICC T20 World Cup Qualifier tournament in the United Arab Emirates.

In November 2020, he revealed that he currently works as a delivery boy for Uber Eats amid the COVID-19 pandemic in order to make a living and is aiming to qualify for England after gaining UK citizenship.

In July 2021, Van Meekeren signed for Durham for the remainder of the 2021 T20 Blast. On debut, he took 2–31 in a loss against Derbyshire. In August 2021 he became the first Dutch player to play in CPL when picked up by St Kitts and Nevis Patriots for 2021 edition.

In September 2021, he was named in the Dutch squad for the 2021 ICC Men's T20 World Cup. Later that month, he signed for Gloucestershire on a two-year deal.

On 28 Oct, 2023, he led the Dutch to a famous victory over Bangladesh by scalping 4 wickets in the 2023 Cricket World Cup game.

In May 2024, he was named in the Netherlands squad for the 2024 ICC Men's T20 World Cup tournament.
