= Netherlands national cricket team =

Sports team representing the Netherlands

Netherlands
- Nickname: The Flying Dutchmen
- Association: Royal Dutch Cricket Association

Personnel
- Captain: Bas de Leede
- Coach: Ashley Noffke

International Cricket Council
- ICC status: Associate Member with ODI status (1966; 60 years ago)
- ICC region: Europe
ICC Rankings	Current	Best-ever
ODI	14th	11th (2 May 2021)
T20I	13th	10th (8 June 2009)

One Day Internationals
- First ODI: v. New Zealand at Reliance Stadium, Vadodara; 17 February 1996
- Last ODI: v. Oman at ICC Academy Ground, Dubai; 2 November 2026
ODIs	Played	Won/Lost
Total	157	61/88 (2 ties, 6 no results)
This year	11	7/3 (0 ties, 1 no result)
- World Cup appearances: 5 (first in 1996)
- Best result: Group stage (1996, 2003, 2007, 2011, 2023)
- World Cup Qualifier appearances: 12 (first in 1979)
- Best result: Champions (2001)

T20 Internationals
- First T20I: v. Kenya at Stormont Cricket Ground, Belfast; 2 August 2008
- Last T20I: v. India at Narendra Modi Stadium, Ahmedabad; 18 February 2026
T20Is	Played	Won/Lost
Total	133	64/61 (3 ties, 5 no results)
This year	4	1/3 (0 ties, 0 no results)
- T20 World Cup appearances: 7 (first in 2009)
- Best result: Super 10 (2014)
- T20 World Cup Qualifier appearances: 6 (Note: For the 2024 and 2026 Men's T20 World Cups, the final round of qualification in Europe was the ICC Europe Regional Final.) (first in 2008)
- Best result: Champions (2008, 2015, 2019)
ODI & T20I kit
- As of 2 November 2026

The Netherlands men's national cricket team (Dutch: Nederlands cricketteam), usually referred as "The Flying Dutchmen" represents the Netherlands in men's international cricket and is administered by the Royal Dutch Cricket Association.

Cricket has been played in the Netherlands since at least the 19th century, and in the 1860s was considered a major sport in the country. Other sports – notably football and field hockey – have long since surpassed cricket in popularity amongst the Dutch, but today there are around 6,000 cricketers in the Netherlands. The first national association, the forerunner of today's Royal Dutch Cricket Association, was formed in 1890 and the Netherlands achieved Associate Membership of the International Cricket Council (ICC) in 1966.

The Netherlands have taken part in all eleven ICC Trophy/World Cup Qualifier tournaments, winning the competition in Canada in 2001 and finishing as runners-up three times (in 1986, 1990 and 2023). The Netherlands also participated in the 1996, 2003, 2007, 2011 and 2023 Cricket World Cups, and from 1995 onwards the national team entered the English domestic NatWest Trophy competition (and its successor, the C&G Trophy). In 2004 they played first-class cricket in the ICC Intercontinental Cup, drawing with Scotland in Aberdeen and then suffering an innings defeat against Ireland in Deventer.

The Netherlands enjoyed full One Day International status from 1 January 2006 until 1 February 2014. They regained Twenty20 International status in June 2014, having played their first match in this format in 2008. The Netherlands regained their ODI status after the conclusion of the 2018 Cricket World Cup Qualifier in March 2018. They had guaranteed this status before the tournament as a result of winning the 2015–17 ICC World Cricket League Championship and thus qualifying for the 2020–23 ICC Cricket World Cup Super League, and retained the status until the 2023 Cricket World Cup Qualifier.

In April 2018, the ICC decided to grant full Twenty20 International (T20I) status to all its members. Therefore, all Twenty20 matches played between the Netherlands and other ICC members after 1 January 2019 have the full T20I status. Bas de Leede is the current team captain.

== History ==
=== 19th century ===
Cricket was introduced to the Netherlands by British soldiers during the Napoleonic Wars in the 19th century. Further clubs came into existence in the 1870s. The Netherlands national team played their first game in 1881. They fielded 22 players against an Uxbridge Cricket Club XI, but still lost by an innings. The Dutch Cricket Union was formed in 1890, with 18 member clubs, four of which are still in existence today.

The first national tournament was held the following year, and was won by Haagsche CC. English touring teams then began visiting in 1890 including one in 1891 that featured the author of Sherlock Holmes, Sir Arthur Conan Doyle.

In 1894, the Gentlemen of Holland were the first Dutch team to visit England. The tour included a game against the MCC at Lord's, which the MCC won by an innings and 169 runs. Tours by English teams continued for the rest of the 1890s, which also saw the emergence of Carst Posthuma, who was later the first Dutch player to play first class cricket. He took 2339 wickets at an average of 8.66 in his career in the Netherlands.

=== 1900s to 1910s ===
1901 saw another visit to England by the Gentlemen of Holland. They played five games on the tour, drawing two and losing the remainder. 1905 saw the first international game against Belgium, which finished in a draw. Cricket began a decline in popularity in the first decade of the 20th century, particularly amongst young athletes, due, in part, to the Dutch sympathizing with the Boers in the Boer War and therefore not being attracted to a game with links to England.

In 1910, the Dutch team visited Belgium to take part in an exhibition tournament, which also featured the MCC, Belgium and France. They lost to the MCC by 2 wickets, and to France by 63 runs, but beat Belgium by 116 runs.

During World War I, in which the Netherlands remained neutral, large numbers of British officers were interned in the country, and many of these joined local cricket clubs. A team made up of these players even won the Dutch championship in 1918.

=== 1920s to 1940s ===
The Flamingos, a Dutch touring team, was formed in 1921, and later made several tours of England. Tours by English teams also continued in this period. The 1930s are said to be the heyday of Dutch cricket. In 1934, the first Dutch women's league was formed, and the women's national team played two games against Australia in 1937, losing heavily in both. Cricket was of course curtailed after the German invasion in 1940.

=== 1950s to 1980s ===
The 1950s saw visits to the Netherlands by Australia and the West Indies, in addition to their first match against Denmark. In 1958, the Cricket Board received a Royal Charter, and became the "Koninklijke Nederlandse Cricket Bond", a name which it retains to this day.

In August 1964, the Netherlands achieved their first victory against a Test-playing nation when they beat Australia by three wickets at The Hague. They were rewarded with associate membership of the ICC two years later.

29 August 1964
Scorecard

Australia; 197 (50.1 overs)	v	Netherlands; 201/7 (57.4 overs)
Norm O'Neill 87; Ben Trijzelaar 3/41 (11 overs)		Pieter Marseille 77; Bob Cowper 4/69 (12.4 overs)

Netherlands won by 3 wickets
De Diepput, The Hague
Umpires: W Amons and G Stallman

- Australia won the toss and elected to bat
- One-day single-innings match

The first two ICC Trophy tournaments, in 1979 and 1982, brought little success to the Dutch, who were eliminated in the first round in both tournaments. But in the 1986 tournament, they finished as runners-up to Zimbabwe. The same year, Paul-Jan Bakker became the first Dutch player to play county cricket. In 1989, the Dutch beat a strong England XI that included two future England captains, Alec Stewart and Nasser Hussain, by 3 runs.

=== 1990s ===
In 1990 the Netherlands hosted the ICC Trophy, the first such tournament outside England, and again finished runners-up to Zimbabwe. In 1991 they achieved a five-wicket win over a West Indies XI, followed in 1993 by a seven-wicket win over an England XI and in 1994 a nine-wicket win over a South Africa XI. In 1994 the Dutch finally qualified for the World Cup, after finishing third in that year's ICC Trophy. In the World Cup itself in 1996, they were eliminated in the first round, but performed with some credit in their game against England.

22 February 1996
Scorecard

England; 279/4 (50 overs)	v	Netherlands; 230/6 (50 overs)
Graeme Hick 104* (133); Roland Lefebvre 1/40 (10 overs)		Klaas van Noortwijk 64 (82); Phil DeFreitas 3/31 (10 overs)

England won by 49 runs
Arbab Niaz Stadium, Peshawar
Umpires: Steve Bucknor and K.T. Francis
Player of the match: Graeme Hick (Eng)

1995 saw the Netherlands enter the NatWest Trophy for the first time. They took part in this tournament for ten years, and their best performance came in 1999 when they reached the fourth round, beating Durham along the way.

The Netherlands failed to qualify for the 1999 World Cup, as they could only manage sixth in the 1997 ICC Trophy. However, the country hosted one World Cup match, between Kenya and South Africa at Amstelveen.

The Netherlands competed in the first European Championship in 1996, coming second. They have competed in every tournament since, winning in 1998 and 2000.

=== 21st century ===
==== 2000–2009 ====
2001 finally saw the Netherlands win the ICC Trophy, beating Namibia in the final in Toronto. They thus qualified for the 2003 World Cup. They again failed to progress beyond the first round in the tournament, but recorded their first one-day international win over Namibia during the tournament. Feiko Kloppenburg (with 121) and Klaas-Jan van Noortwijk (134 not out) scored the first two One Day International centuries in the team's history.

In the 2005 ICC Trophy, the Netherlands finished 5th, qualifying for the 2007 Cricket World Cup, and gaining one-day International status until the 2009 ICC World Cup Qualifier. Their first one-day international with this new status was scheduled to be against Kenya in March 2006; however this match was cancelled due to a Kenyan tour of Bangladesh. Instead their first ODI with this status (and their twelfth overall) came against Sri Lanka; this was their first ODI at home. However Sri Lanka won the two match series 2–0, with a then-record ODI score of 443–9.

The Dutch played their first Intercontinental Cup match of 2006 against Kenya in Nairobi in March. The game was drawn, but the Netherlands gained six points for a first innings lead. In August, the Netherlands competed in Division One of the European Championship. They beat Denmark and Italy, but lost to Scotland and their game against Ireland was rained off. They finished third in the tournament.

In November, the Dutch travelled to South Africa. They first played an Intercontinental Cup match against Bermuda: David Hemp achieved what was then a competition record score of 247 not out in the drawn match. This was followed by a triangular series against Bermuda and Canada, which they won. Their final game of 2006, also in South Africa, was an Intercontinental Cup game against Canada. They won the match by 7 wickets, with Ryan ten Doeschate setting a new competition record individual score of 259 not out.

In early 2007, they travelled to Nairobi, Kenya to take part in Division One of the World Cricket League, finishing third out of six. This was followed by the 2007 World Cup in the West Indies, where they were eliminated in the first round, though they did beat Scotland along the way.

Following the World Cup, the team underwent a period of transformation. Captain Luuk van Troost retired, as did Tim de Leede and their coach Peter Cantrell. Daan van Bunge also opted to take a break from international cricket, and the new coach opted not to retain the services of bowling coach Ian Pont.

In June 2007, they visited Canada, first winning an Intercontinental Cup match against Canada in King City, Ontario. They then won the first ODI by 117 runs, with the second one being abandoned. They then played a quadrangular series in Ireland, losing by ten wickets to the West Indies, and by one run to Ireland, with the game against Scotland being abandoned due to rain.

In August 2008, The Netherlands participated in the 2009 ICC World Twenty20 Qualifier. This was their debut playing Twenty20 International matches. They finished in first place in Group B, based on their run-rate. After beating Scotland in the semi-finals, the final was abandoned due to rain and the trophy was shared between the Netherlands and Ireland.

The Netherlands caused a sensation in the cricketing world by beating England in the opening match of the ICC World Twenty20 2009, whilst being 500/1 outsiders.

5 June 2009
17:30 (D/N)
Scorecard

England; 162/5 (20 overs)	v	Netherlands; 163/6 (20 overs)
Luke Wright 71 (49); Ryan ten Doeschate 2/35 (4 overs)		Tom de Grooth 49 (30); James Anderson 3/23 (4 overs)

Netherlands won by 4 wickets
Lord's, London
Umpires: Asoka de Silva (SL) and Steve Davis (Aus)
Player of the match: Tom de Grooth (Ned)

- Netherlands won the toss and elected to field.

They lost their second match to the eventual winners Pakistan and did not qualify for the Super 8 stage based on run rate.

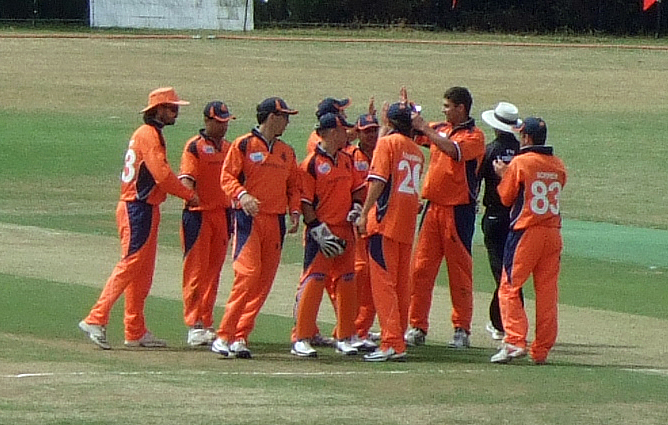
Netherlands national cricket team at Rotterdam, ICC WCL Division One in 2010

==== 2010–present ====
On 20 July 2010, The Netherlands beat a full-member nation for the first time in an ODI. In a one-off match shortened by rain to 30 overs a team, they beat Bangladesh by 6 wickets. The win in combination with their winning percentage against other associate and affiliate nations resulted in The Netherlands being included in ICC's official ODI-rankings.

20 July 2010
Scorecard

Bangladesh; 199/7 (30 overs)	v	Netherlands; 200/4 (28.5 overs)
Imrul Kayes 52 (50); Peter Borren 3/30 (6 overs)		Eric Szwarczynski 67 (54); Nazmul Hossain 2/28 (6 overs)

Netherlands won by 6 wickets (with 7 balls remaining)
Titwood, Glasgow Scotland
Umpires: Kumar Dharmasena (SRL) and Ian Ramage (SCO)

- Netherlands won the toss and elected to field.
- Match reduced to 30 overs a team.
  First ever ODI win for Netherlands over a full ICC Member team.

On 22 February 2011, The Netherlands posted their highest ever total against a full-member nation, scoring 292 against England, batting first at the 2011 Cricket World Cup. Ryan Ten Doeschate top scored 119 from 110 balls. However, the Netherlands were unable to defend their strong total and failed to pull off a huge shock, England winning by 6 wickets with 2 overs to spare. They eventually failed to win any of their group matches and were last in their Group.

In September 2011, Netherlands whitewashed Kenya in a short two-match ODI series held at home.

In the 2014 ICC World Twenty20, Netherlands had one win and one loss before their final game. In order to go through on net run rate against Zimbabwe and Ireland, they needed to chase down Ireland's score in 14.2 overs or less. As Ireland scored 189, this seemed unlikely. However, strong and aggressive batting enabled them to score 193/4 in 13.5 overs, securing passage to the 2014 ICC World Twenty20 Super 10s. Although they lost their first three games in the group, including a 39/10 against Sri Lanka, they pulled off an upset against England in their last game.

31 March
Scorecard

Netherlands; 133/5 (20 overs)	v	England; 88 (17.4 overs)
Wesley Barresi 48 (45); Stuart Broad 3/24 (4 overs)		Ravi Bopara 18 (20); Logan van Beek 3/9 (2 overs)

Netherlands won by 45 runs
Zohur Ahmed Chowdhury Stadium, Chittagong

In June 2014, Nepal along with Netherlands granted T20I status by the ICC board at the annual conference in Melbourne.

In their last match of the 2022 ICC T20 World Cup, The Netherlands defeated South Africa in a massive upset, knocking them out of the tournament as a result, also finishing in their best ever position (8th) to date in a T20 World Cup.

6 November 2022
10:30
Scorecard

Netherlands; 158/4 (20 overs)	v	South Africa; 145/8 (20 overs)
Colin Ackermann 41* (26); Keshav Maharaj 2/27 (4 overs)		Rilee Rossouw 25 (19); Brandon Glover 3/9 (2 overs)

Netherlands won by 13 runs
Adelaide Oval, Adelaide
Umpires: Michael Gough (Eng) and Langton Rusere (Zim)
Player of the match: Colin Ackermann (Ned)

- South Africa won the toss and elected to field.
- Pakistan qualified for the semi-finals as a result of this match, while South Africa were eliminated.

In the 2023 Cricket World Cup, the Netherlands defeated South Africa for a second time in one of the biggest upsets in World Cup history.

17 October 2023
14:00 (D/N)
Scorecard

Netherlands; 245/8 (43 overs)	v	South Africa; 207 (42.5 overs)
Scott Edwards 78* (69); Marco Jansen 2/27 (8 overs)		David Miller 43 (52); Logan Van Beek 3/60 (8.5 overs)

Netherlands won by 38 runs
Himachal Pradesh Cricket Association Stadium, Dharamshala
Umpires: Michael Gough (Eng) and Richard Kettleborough (Eng)
Player of the match: Scott Edwards (Ned)

- South Africa won the toss and elected to field.
- Due to a rain delay, the match was reduced to 43 overs per side.

== International grounds ==
Locations of all stadiums which have hosted an international cricket match within the Netherlands

Ground	City	Province	Capacity	Matches hosted	Notes
Hazelaarweg Stadion	Rotterdam	South Holland	3,500	ODIs, T20Is	Home ground of VOC Rotterdam
Sportpark Thurlede	Schiedam	South Holland	2,000	ODIs	Hosts matches for Excelsior '20
Sportpark Westvliet	The Hague	South Holland	2,000	ODIs, T20Is	Home of HCC (Haagsche Cricket Club)
VRA Cricket Ground	Amstelveen	North Holland	5,000	ODIs, T20Is	Premier Dutch cricket venue; hosted full-member teams
Sportpark Het Schootsveld	Deventer	Overijssel	1,000	ODIs	Also used for ICC qualifiers
Sportpark Maarschalkerweerd	Utrecht	Utrecht	1,500	ODIs, T20Is	Shared use with Kampong Cricket Club

== Tournament history ==
Legend

- Champions
- Runners-up
- Third place/Semi-finals
- Hosts
- Q Qualified/Advanced to next stage
- DNQ Did not qualify
- ▲ Promoted
- Remained in the same division
- ▼ Relegated

=== Cricket World Cup ===
Cricket World Cup record								Qualification record				
Year	Round	Position	Pld	W	L	T	NR	Pld	W	L	T	NR
(England) 1975	Not invited							No qualifiers held				
(England) 1979	Did not qualify							4	1	2	0	1
(England) (Wales) 1983	Did not qualify							7	3	1	0	3
(India) (Pakistan) 1987	Did not qualify							10	8	2	0	0
(Australia) (New Zealand) 1992	Did not qualify							9	7	2	0	0
(India) (Pakistan) (Sri Lanka) 1996	Group stage	12/12	5	0	5	0	0	9	7	2	0	0
(England) (Wales) (Scotland) (Republic of Ireland) (Netherlands) 1999	Did not qualify							8	3	3	0	2
(South Africa) (Zimbabwe) (Kenya) 2003	Group stage	11/14	6	1	5	0	0	10	9	1	0	0
(Cricket West Indies) 2007	Group stage	12/16	3	1	2	0	0	7	5	2	0	0
(India) (Sri Lanka) (Bangladesh) 2011	Group stage	13/14	6	0	6	0	0	13	9	4	0	0
(Australia) (New Zealand) 2015	Did not qualify							26	14	10	1	1
(England) (Wales) 2019	Did not qualify							26	17	7	0	2
(India) 2023	League stage	10/10	9	2	7	0	0	34	8	24	1	1
(South Africa) (Zimbabwe) (Namibia) 2027	To be determined							32*	17	11	0	4
Total	0 Titles	5/13	29	4	25	0	0	195	108	71	2	14

=== Cricket World Cup Qualifier ===
Cricket World Cup Qualifier record
Year	Round	Position	Pld	W	L	T	NR	Qual.
(Sri Lanka) 1979	Group stage	10/15	4	1	2	0	1	DNQ
(England) 1982	Group stage	6/16	7	3	1	0	3	DNQ
(England) 1986	Runners-up	2/16	10	8	2	0	0	DNQ
(Netherlands) 1990	Runners-up	2/17	9	7	2	0	0	DNQ
(Kenya) 1994	Third place	3/20	9	7	2	0	0	Q
(Malaysia) 1997	Play-offs	6/22	8	3	3	0	2	DNQ
(Canada) 2001	Winners	1/24	10	9	1	0	0	Q
(Ireland) 2005	Play-offs	5/12	7	5	2	0	0	Q
(South Africa) 2009	Third place	3/12	10	7	3	0	0	Q
(New Zealand) 2014	Play-offs	7/10	6	4	2	0	0	DNQ
(Zimbabwe) 2018	Play-offs	7/10	6	3	3	0	0	DNQ
(Zimbabwe) 2023	Runners-up	2/10	10	5	4	1	0	Q
2027	Qualified							
Total	1 Title	13/13	96	62	27	1	6	—N/a

=== CWC League 2 ===
Cricket World Cup League 2 record
Year	Round	Position	Pld	W	L	T	NR	P/R
2019–2023	Part of Super League							
2024–2026	Third place	3/8	36	20	12	0	4	Same position
Total	0 Titles	1/2	36	20	12	0	4	—N/a

=== Men's T20 World Cup ===
Men's T20 World Cup record								Qualification record				
Year	Round	Position	Pld	W	L	T	NR	Pld	W	L	T	NR
(South Africa) 2007	Did not qualify							5	3	2	0	0
(England) 2009	Group stage	9/12	2	1	1	0	0	4	2	1	0	1
(Cricket West Indies) 2010	Did not qualify							6	3	3	0	0
(Sri Lanka) 2012	Did not qualify							9	7	2	0	0
(Bangladesh) 2014	Super 10	9/16	7	3	4	0	0	10	7	3	0	0
(India) 2016	First round	12/16	3	1	1	0	1	9	6	2	0	1
(United Arab Emirates) (Oman) 2021	First round	15/16	3	0	3	0	0	9	8	1	0	0
(Australia) 2022	Super 12	8/16	8	4	4	0	1	9	6	2	0	1
(United States) (Cricket West Indies) 2024	Group Stage	14/20	4	1	3	0	0	Qualified automatically				
(India) (Sri Lanka) 2026	Group Stage	15/20	4	1	3	0	0	4	3	1	0	0
(Australia) (New Zealand) 2028	To be determined							To be determined				
Total	0 Titles	7/10	31	11	19	0	1	61	43	16	0	2

=== T20 World Cup Global Qualifier ===
Men's T20 World Cup Global Qualifier record
Year	Round	Position	Pld	W	L	T	NR	Qual.
(Ireland) 2008	Joint winners	=1/6	4	2	1	0	1	Q
(United Arab Emirates) 2010	Group stage	4/8	6	3	3	0	0	DNQ
(United Arab Emirates) 2012	Play-offs	4/16	9	7	2	0	0	DNQ
(United Arab Emirates) 2013	Quarter-finals	5/16	10	7	3	0	0	Q
(Ireland) (Scotland) 2015	Joint winners	=1/14	9	6	2	0	1	Q
(United Arab Emirates) 2019	Winners	1/14	9	8	1	0	0	Q
(Zimbabwe) 2022 (B)	Runners-up	2/8	5	4	1	0	0	Q
(To be determined) 2028	Qualified							
Total	3 Titles	8/8	52	37	13	0	2	—N/a

=== T20 World Cup Europe Regional Final ===
T20 World Cup Europe Regional Final record
Year	Round	Position	Pld	W	L	T	NR	Qual.
(Guernsey) 2019	Received a bye to the Global Qualifier							
(Spain) 2021	Received a bye to the Global Qualifier							
(Scotland) 2023	Qualified directly to the T20 World Cup							
(Netherlands) 2025	Winners	1/5	4	3	1	0	0	Q
(To be determined) 2027	Received a bye to the Global Qualifier							
Total	1 Title	1/5	4	3	1	0	0	—N/a

=== Champions Trophy ===
Known as the "ICC Knockout" in 1998 and 2000

Champions Trophy record
Year	Round	Position	Pld	W	L	T	NR
(Bangladesh) 1998	Did not qualify						
(Kenya) 2000	Did not qualify						
(Sri Lanka) 2002	Group stage	12/12	2	0	2	0	0
(England) 2004	Did not qualify						
(India) 2006	Did not qualify						
(South Africa) 2009	Did not qualify						
(England) (Wales) 2013	Did not qualify						
(England) (Wales) 2017	Did not qualify						
(Pakistan) (United Arab Emirates) 2025	Did not qualify						
(India) 2029	To be determined						
Total	0 Ttile	1/9	2	0	2	0	0

=== Other international tournaments ===
CWC Super League (ODI)	World Cricket League (LA/OD/ODI)	ICC Intercontinental Cup (FC)	ICC 6 Nations Challenge (List A)
2019–23: 13th place	2007 (Division One): 3rd place; 2010 (Division One): 4th place; 2011–13 (Championship): 4th place; 2015 (Division Two): Winners (▲); 2015–17 (Championship): Winners	2004: First round; 2005: First round; 2006: First round; 2007–08: 5th place; 2009–10: 6th place; 2011–13: 8th place; 2015–17: 3rd place	2000: Runners-up; 2002: 6th place; 2004: 4th place

=== Other regional tournaments ===
European Championship
- 1996: Runners-up
- 1998: Winners
- 2000: Division One winners
- 2002: 4th place (Division One)
- 2004: 3rd place (Division One)
- 2006: 3rd place (Division One)
- 2010–2015: Ineligible

== Records and statistics ==
International match summary – Netherlands

Last updated 2 November 2026.

**Playing Record**
Format	M	W	L	T	NR	Inaugural match
One-Day Internationals	157	61	88	2	6	17 February 1996
Twenty20 Internationals	133	64	61	3	5	2 August 2008

=== One-Day Internationals ===
- Highest team total: 374/6 v. Scotland 12 June 2025 at Forthill, Dundee
- Highest individual score: 158*, Max O'Dowd v. Scotland on 12 June 2025 at Forthill, Dundee
- Best individual bowling figures: 6/34, Aryan Dutt v. Namibia on 19 February 2024 at Tribhuvan University International Cricket Ground, Kirtipur

**Most ODI runs for Netherlands**

Player	Runs	Average	Career span
**Max O'Dowd**	2,601	36.63	2019–2026
**Scott Edwards**	2,487	42.15	2018–2026
**Bas de Leede**	1,574	30.26	2018–2026
Ryan ten Doeschate	1,541	67.00	2006–2011
Wesley Barresi	1,352	27.59	2010–2025

**Most ODI wickets for Netherlands**

Player	Wickets	Average	Career span
**Aryan Dutt**	80	30.01	2021–2026
**Paul van Meekeren**	63	27.87	2013–2026
Mudassar Bukhari	57	28.08	2007–2014
Pieter Seelaar	57	35.68	2006–2022
Ryan ten Doeschate	55	24.12	2006–2011
**Logan van Beek**	55	31.18	2021–2026

- Players still playing for Netherlands are listed in **bold**.

ODI record versus other nations

Records complete to ODI #5057. Last updated 2 November 2026.

Opponent	M	W	L	T	NR	First match	First win
**ICC Full members**
Afghanistan	10	2	8	0	0	30 August 2009	30 August 2009
Australia	3	0	3	0	0	20 February 2003	
Bangladesh	3	2	1	0	0	20 July 2010	20 July 2010
England	7	0	7	0	0	22 February 1996	
India	3	0	3	0	0	12 February 2003	
Ireland	13	3	8	1	1	8 August 2006	5 February 2007
New Zealand	5	0	5	0	0	17 February 1996	
Pakistan	7	0	7	0	0	26 February 1996	
South Africa	8	1	6	0	1	5 March 1996	17 October 2023
Sri Lanka	6	0	6	0	0	16 September 2002	
West Indies	6	0	5	1	0	10 July 2007	
Zimbabwe	7	3	4	0	0	28 February 2003	19 June 2019
**ICC Associate members**
Bermuda	7	6	1	0	0	28 November 2006	28 November 2006
Canada	14	10	1	0	3	26 November 2006	26 November 2006
Kenya	10	7	3	0	0	31 January 2007	21 August 2008
Namibia	7	5	2	0	0	3 March 2003	3 March 2003
Nepal	9	5	4	0	0	1 August 2018	1 August 2018
Oman	5	3	2	0	0	3 July 2023	3 July 2023
Scotland	16	6	9	0	1	6 August 2006	22 March 2007
United Arab Emirates	7	4	3	0	0	1 March 1996	9 November 2024
United States	4	4	0	0	0	22 June 2023	22 June 2023

=== Twenty20 Internationals ===
- Highest team total: 247/5 v. Namibia on 29 February 2024 at Tribhuvan University International Cricket Ground, Kirtipur.
- Highest individual score: 135, Michael Levitt v. Namibia on 29 February 2024 at Tribhuvan University International Cricket Ground, Kirtipur.
- Best individual bowling figures: 5/19, Ahsan Malik v. South Africa on 27 March 2014 at Zohur Ahmed Chowdhury Stadium, Chittagong.

**Most T20I runs for Netherlands**

Player	Runs	Average	Career span
Max O'Dowd	2,354	29.06	2015–2026
Scott Edwards	1,316	23.08	2018–2026
Ben Cooper	1,239	28.15	2013–2021
Michael Levitt	945	33.75	2024–2026
Stephan Myburgh	915	21.78	2012–2022

**Most T20I wickets for Netherlands**

Player	Wickets	Average	Career span
Paul van Meekeren	84	21.55	2013–2025
Roelof van der Merwe	61	19.27	2015–2026
Pieter Seelaar	58	22.24	2008–2021
Timm van der Gugten	52	22.51	2012–2026
Fred Klaassen	45	23.66	2018–2026

T20I record versus other nations

Records complete to T20I #3723. Last updated 18 February 2026.

Opponent	Matches	Won	Lost	Tied	No Result	First	Last
**Full Members**
Afghanistan	4	2	2	0	0	12 February 2010	12 February 2010
Bangladesh	8	1	6	0	1	25 July 2012	26 July 2012
England	2	2	0	0	0	5 June 2009	5 June 2009
India	2	0	2	0	0	27 October 2022	
Ireland	15	7	7	0	1	5 August 2008	21 March 2014
New Zealand	3	0	3	0	0	29 March 2014	
Pakistan	3	0	3	0	0	9 June 2009	
South Africa	3	1	2	0	0	27 March 2014	6 November 2022
Sri Lanka	4	0	4	0	0	24 March 2014	
Zimbabwe	5	2	2	1	0	19 March 2014	23 June 2019
**ICC Associate members**
Bermuda	1	1	0	0	0	26 October 2019	26 October 2019
Canada	5	3	2	0	0	2 August 2008	9 February 2010
Guernsey	1	1	0	0	0	9 July 2025	9 July 2025
Hong Kong	3	2	1	0	0	18 January 2017	10 October 2019
Italy	1	1	0	0	0	11 July 2025	11 July 2025
Jersey	1	1	0	0	0	5 July 2025	5 July 2025
Kenya	6	4	2	0	0	2 August 2008	2 August 2008
Malaysia	2	1	0	1	0	18 April 2021	18 April 2021
Namibia	6	4	1	0	1	19 October 2019	19 October 2019
Nepal	15	7	6	1	1	30 June 2015	16 June 2025
Oman	7	4	2	0	1	11 March 2016	15 January 2017
Papua New Guinea	3	2	1	0	0	24 October 2019	2 November 2019
Scotland	18	9	9	0	0	4 August 2008	4 August 2008
Singapore	1	1	0	0	0	22 October 2019	22 October 2019
Uganda	1	1	0	0	0	14 July 2022	14 July 2022
United Arab Emirates	9	5	4	0	0	17 March 2014	17 March 2014
United States	4	3	1	0	0	15 July 2022	15 July 2022

== Other records ==
=== ICC Trophy ===
- Highest team total: 425/4 v. Israel, 18 June 1986 at Solihull, England
- Highest individual innings: 169 not out, Rupert Gomes v. Israel, 4 June 1990 at Amstelveen, Netherlands
- Best innings bowling: 7/9, Asim Khan v. East & Central Africa, 24 March 1997 at Royal Military College, Kuala Lumpur, Malaysia

== Notable players ==
Several Dutch cricketers have also played at first-class level elsewhere, the most successful of these probably being Roland Lefebvre who played for Somerset and Glamorgan in English county cricket as well as for Canterbury in New Zealand.

Dutch players to have played first class cricket outside of the Intercontinental Cup include:

- Ryan ten Doeschate – Playing for Essex, Canterbury Wizards, Kolkata Knight Riders and the Mashonaland Eagles
- Dirk Nannes – who has played for the Victorian Bushrangers in Australia, the Delhi Daredevils, the Royal Challengers Bangalore and the Chennai Super Kings in the IPL, and has played T20I and ODI cricket for Australia.
- Nolan Clarke – who played for Barbados from 1969/70 until 1976/77.
- Tom Cooper – who currently plays first class cricket for South Australia
- Michael Swart - who played for Western Australia from 2010 until 2011.
- Paul-Jan Bakker – who played for Hampshire from 1986 until 1992.
- Alexei Kervezee – Playing for Worcestershire since 2007.
- Bill Glerum – who played one first class game for the Free Foresters in 1957.
- Carst Posthuma – who played five first class games for London County Cricket Club in 1903.
- Darron Reekers – who played three first-class games for Otago in 1997/98 and List A matches for both Otago and Canterbury (1994/95-2001/02).
- Daan van Bunge – who played for Middlesex in 2004.
- Andre van Troost – who played for Somerset from 1991 to 1998, and for Griqualand West in the 1994/95 season in South Africa.
- Bas Zuiderent – who played for Sussex from 2001 to 2003.
- Timm van der Gugten – Played for New South Wales and others in Australia and New Zealand. Now playing for Glamorgan.
- Logan van Beek - who currently plays for Wellington Firebirds and previously represented Canterbury Wizards and Worcestershire.
- Paul van Meekeren - who played for Somerset from 2016 to 2019, Durham in 2021, and for Gloucestershire in 2022 and 2023.
- Fred Klaassen - who currently plays for Kent.
- Bas de Leede - who currently plays for Durham.

- Shane Snater - who currently plays for Essex.

== Current squad ==
Updated as of 21 February 2026.

This lists all the active players who are contracted to or have played for Netherlands in the past year and the forms in which they have played, and any players (in italics) outside this criterion who have been selected in the team's most recent ODI or T20I squad. Uncapped players are listed in italics.

Name	Age	Batting style	Bowling style	Forms	No	Last ODI	Last T20I	Notes
Batters
Colin Ackermann	35	Right-handed	Right-arm off break	ODI, T20I	48	(Namibia) 2025	(India) 2026	
Cedric de Lange	19	left-handed	Leg break	ODI	3	(Canada) 2026	—N/a	
Michael Levitt	23	Right-handed	Right-arm medium	ODI, T20I	55	(Scotland) 2025	(India) 2026	
Teja Nidamanuru	32	Right-handed	Right-arm off break	ODI, T20I	25	(Scotland) 2025	(Bangladesh) 2025	
Max O'Dowd	32	Right-handed	Right-arm off break	ODI, T20I	4	(Canada) 2026	(India) 2026	
Vikramjit Singh	23	Left-handed	Right-arm medium	ODI, T20I	7	(Scotland) 2025	(Bangladesh) 2025	
Sikander Zulfiqar	29	Right-handed	Right-arm medium	T20I		—N/a	(Bangladesh) 2025	
All-rounders
Bas de Leede	27	Right-handed	Right-arm medium-fast	ODI, T20I	5	(Canada) 2026	(India) 2026	
Zach Lion-Cachet	22	Right-handed	Right-arm off break	ODI, T20I	15	(Canada) 2026	(India) 2026	
Roelof van der Merwe	41	Right-handed	Slow left-arm orthodox	ODI, T20I	52	(Canada) 2026	(India) 2026	
Tim Pringle	24	Right-handed	Slow left-arm orthodox	T20I	11	(Pakistan) 2022	(Bangladesh) 2025	
Saqib Zulfiqar	29	Right-handed	Leg break	T20I	66	(Afghanistan) 2023	(Italy) 2025	
Wicket-keepers
Noah Croes	26	Right-handed	—N/a	ODI, T20I	36	(Canada) 2026	(India) 2026	
Scott Edwards	30	Right-handed	—N/a	ODI, T20I	35	(Canada) 2026	(India) 2026	Captain
Wesley Barresi	42	Right-handed	Right-arm off break	ODI	35	(Scotland) 2025	(Ireland) 2024	
Pace bowlers
Paul van Meekeren	33	Right-handed	Right-arm fast-medium	ODI, T20I	47	(Scotland) 2025	(Pakistan) 2026	
Logan van Beek	36	Right-handed	Right-arm medium-fast	ODI, T20I	17	(Canada) 2026	(India) 2026	
Vivian Kingma	32	Right-handed	Right-arm medium-fast	ODI, T20I	23	(Scotland) 2025	(Scotland) 2025	
Fred Klaassen	34	Right-handed	Left-arm fast-medium	ODI, T20I	12	(Scotland) 2025	(United States) 2026	
Kyle Klein	25	Right-handed	Right-arm medium	ODI, T20I	1	(Canada) 2026	(India) 2026	
Alex Roy	27	Right-handed	Right-arm fast-medium	ODI	8	(Canada) 2026	—N/a	
Timm van der Gugten	35	Right-handed	Right-arm fast-medium	ODI, T20I	10	(Namibia) 2025	(Namibia) 2026	
Ben Fletcher	26	Left-handed	Left-arm medium	T20I	13	—N/a	(Nepal) 2025	
Spin bowlers
Shariz Ahmad	23	Left-handed	Leg break googly	ODI, T20I	18	(United Arab Emirates) 2024	(Bangladesh) 2025	
Daniel Doram	29	Left-handed	Slow left-arm orthodox	ODI, T20I	33	(Canada) 2026	(Bangladesh) 2025	
Aryan Dutt	23	Right-handed	Right-arm off break	ODI, T20I	88	(Canada) 2026	(India) 2026	

== Coaching staff ==
Position	Name
High Performance Manager	Roland Lefebvre
Head coach	Ashley Noffke
Batting coach	Heino Kuhn
Bowling coach	Ryan van Niekerk
Strength & Conditioning coach	Dean Munsami
Physiotherapist	George Dunlop

== Coaches ==
The following people have coached the Dutch national team at various stages. For some coaches, the exact dates of their tenure are unavailable, although key tournaments are noted:

Name	Appointed	Resigned	Notable tournaments
Emmerson Trotman	1996/1997	October 2004	2001 ICC Trophy (won); 2002 Champions Trophy; 2003 World Cup
Peter Cantrell (acting)	October 2004	November 2004	
Bob Simpson	November 2004	after 2005 ICC Trophy	2005 ICC Trophy
Peter Cantrell	November 2005	April 2007	2007 WCL (Div. 1); 2007 World Cup
Paul-Jan Bakker (acting)	1 May 2007	January 2008	2007–08 Intercontinental Cup (first two matches)
Peter Drinnen	January 2008	October 2013	2007–08 Intercontinental Cup (last five matches); 2009 World Cup Qualifier; 2010 WCL (Div. 1); 2011 World Cup; 2011–13 WCL Championship
Anton Roux (initially acting)	October 2013	2016	2014 World Cup Qualifier; 2016 World Twenty20
Ryan Campbell	April 2017	November 2022	2018 World Cup Qualifier; 2021 T20 World Cup
Ryan Cook (initially acting)	November 2022		2022 T20 World Cup; 2023 World Cup Qualifier; 2023 World Cup; 2024 T20 World Cup

== See also ==
- Dutch national cricket captains
- List of Netherlands ODI cricketers
- List of Netherlands Twenty20 International cricketers
- Netherlands national women's cricket team
- Cricket in the Netherlands
