= List of Have You Been Paying Attention? episodes =

Have You Been Paying Attention? is an Australian game show which sees host Tom Gleisner quiz five guests on the previous week's news stories.

The first season, consisting of 8 episodes, premiered on 3 November 2013 and concluded on 22 December 2013. The second season of 26 episodes premiered on 23 February 2014 and finished on 29 September 2014. The 28-episode third season premiered on 11 May 2015 and concluded on 16 November 2015.

In addition to the regular seasons, one-off "Year in Review" specials aired from 2014 to 2024, which expand on the regular episode format by having guests examined on the top news stories of that year.

== Season overview ==
Season	Episodes	Originally aired	
Season	Episodes	First aired	Last aired
1	8	3 November 2013	22 December 2013
2	26 + 1 Special	23 February 2014	29 September 2014
3	28 + 1 Special	11 May 2015	23 November 2015
4	27 + 1 Special	9 May 2016	21 November 2016
5	29 + 1 Special	8 May 2017	27 November 2017
6	27 + 1 Special	14 May 2018	19 November 2018
7	28 + 1 Special	13 May 2019	25 November 2019
8	29 + 1 Special	4 May 2020	23 November 2020
9	28 + 1 Special	3 May 2021	15 November 2021
10	25 + 1 Special	16 May 2022	7 November 2022
11	25 + 1 Special	15 May 2023	6 November 2023
12	24 + 1 Special	13 May 2024	28 October 2024
13	22	12 May 2025	6 October 2025
14	24	4 May 2026	12 October 2026

== Episodes ==
=== Season 1 (2013) ===
Note: Winners are listed in bold

No. overall	No. in season	Guests	Timeslot	Original release date	Viewers
1	1	Ed Kavalee, Jane Kennedy, Troy Kinne, **Rachel Corbett**, Sam Pang	7 pm Sunday	3 November 2013	301,000
2	2	**Ed Kavalee**, Kate Langbroek, Troy Kinne, Rachel Corbett, Sam Pang	7 pm Sunday	10 November 2013	420,000
3	3	Ed Kavalee, **Jane Kennedy**, Mick Molloy, Celia Pacquola, Sam Pang	7 pm Sunday	17 November 2013	352,000
4	4	Ed Kavalee, **Celia Pacquola**, Troy Kinne, Rachel Corbett, Sam Pang	7 pm Sunday	24 November 2013	294,000
5	5	**Ed Kavalee**, Jane Kennedy, Glenn Robbins, Celia Pacquola, Sam Pang	7 pm Sunday	1 December 2013	396,000
6	6	**Ed Kavalee**, Jane Kennedy, Glenn Robbins, Ronny Chieng, Sam Pang	7 pm Sunday	8 December 2013	379,000
7	7	Ed Kavalee, **Celia Pacquola**, Mick Molloy, Rachel Corbett, Sam Pang	7 pm Sunday	15 December 2013	N/A
8	8	**Ed Kavalee**, Kate Langbroek, Troy Kinne, Tegan Higginbotham, Sam Pang	6 pm Sunday (Note: Season 1, Episode 8 aired at various times across Australia, due to live coverage of the Big Bash League.)	22 December 2013	235,000

=== Season 2 (2014) ===
Note: Winners are listed in bold

No. overall	No. in season	Guests	Timeslot	Original release date	Viewers
9	1	**Ed Kavalee**, Jane Kennedy, Mick Molloy, Celia Pacquola, Sam Pang	6 pm Sunday	23 February 2014	168,000
10	2	Ed Kavalee, **Chrissie Swan**, Troy Kinne, Rachel Corbett, Sam Pang	6 pm Sunday	2 March 2014	226,000
11	3	Ed Kavalee, **Jane Kennedy**, Ronny Chieng, Kate Langbroek, Sam Pang	6 pm Sunday (Note: An extended 45-minute "Adults Only" edition of Season 2, Episode 3 aired at around 10:30pm on Sunday, 9 March 2014.)	9 March 2014	195,000
12	4	Ed Kavalee, **Chrissie Swan**, Glenn Robbins, Tegan Higginbotham, Sam Pang	7 pm Sunday (Note: Season 2, Episode 4 aired at the later time of 7pm on Sunday, 16 March 2014, immediately following the Australian Formula One Grand Prix in Eastern states.)	16 March 2014	276,000
13	5	Lehmo, **Cal Wilson**, Dave Hughes, Celia Pacquola, Sam Pang	6 pm Sunday	23 March 2014	193,000
14	6	Ed Kavalee, Jane Kennedy, **Glenn Robbins**, Jen Kirkman, Sam Pang	6 pm Sunday	30 March 2014	N/A
15	7	Ed Kavalee, Sara Pascoe, Josh Lawson, **Celia Pacquola**, Sam Pang	6 pm Sunday	6 April 2014	231,000
16	8	Ed Kavalee, Lehmo, Mick Molloy, **Fifi Box**, Sam Pang	9:30 pm Monday	19 May 2014	164,000
17	9	**Ed Kavalee**, Jane Kennedy, Dave Hughes, Kate Langbroek, Sam Pang	9:30 pm Monday	26 May 2014	173,000
18	10	Ed Kavalee, Ronny Chieng, Josh Lawson, **Cal Wilson**, Sam Pang	9:30 pm Monday	2 June 2014	186,000
19	11	**Ed Kavalee**, Dave Hughes, Mick Molloy, Celia Pacquola, Sam Pang	9:30 pm Monday	9 June 2014	212,000
20	12	Ed Kavalee, Kate Langbroek, Mick Molloy, **Celia Pacquola**, Sam Pang	9:30 pm Monday	16 June 2014	227,000
21	13	Ed Kavalee, **Chrissie Swan**, Lehmo, Cal Wilson, Sam Pang	9:30 pm Monday	23 June 2014	247,000
22	14	Ed Kavalee, **Glenn Robbins**, Kate Langbroek, Celia Pacquola, Sam Pang	9:30 pm Monday	30 June 2014	235,000
23	15	Ed Kavalee, Glenn Robbins, **Dave Hughes**, Akmal Saleh, Sam Pang	9:30 pm Monday	7 July 2014	268,000
24	16	**Ed Kavalee**, Tegan Higginbotham, Mick Molloy, Cal Wilson, Peter Helliar	8:40 pm Monday	14 July 2014	408,000
25	17	**Ed Kavalee**, Jane Kennedy, Merrick Watts, Kate Langbroek, Sam Pang	8:40 pm Monday	21 July 2014	498,000
26	18	**Ed Kavalee**, Jane Kennedy, Mick Molloy, Troy Kinne, Sam Pang	8:30 pm Monday	4 August 2014	379,000
27	19	Ed Kavalee, **Lehmo**, Merrick Watts, Akmal Saleh, Sam Pang	8:30 pm Monday	11 August 2014	440,000
28	20	Kate Langbroek, Glenn Robbins, Santo Cilauro, **Michala Banas**, Sam Pang	8:30 pm Monday	18 August 2014	435,000
29	21	Ed Kavalee, **Jane Kennedy**, Santo Cilauro, Lehmo, Peter Helliar	8:30 pm Monday	25 August 2014	423,000
30	22	Ed Kavalee, Glenn Robbins, Mick Molloy, **Michala Banas**, Merrick Watts	8:30 pm Monday	1 September 2014	430,000
31	23	Ed Kavalee, **Kate Langbroek**, Lawrence Mooney, Arj Barker, Peter Helliar	8:30 pm Monday	8 September 2014	465,000
32	24	Ed Kavalee, Jane Kennedy, Dave Hughes, **Michala Banas**, Sam Pang	8:30 pm Monday	15 September 2014	509,000
33	25	**Ed Kavalee**, Josh Lawson, Mick Molloy, Celia Pacquola, Sam Pang	8:30 pm Monday	22 September 2014	429,000
34	26	**Ed Kavalee**, Glenn Robbins, Dave Hughes, Celia Pacquola, Sam Pang	8:30 pm Monday	29 September 2014	484,000

=== Season 3 (2015) ===
Note: Winners are listed in bold

No. overall	No. in season	Guests	Guest Quiz Master(s)	Timeslot	Original release date	Viewers
36	1	Ed Kavalee, Jane Kennedy, **Mick Molloy**, Fifi Box, Sam Pang	Gina Liano	8:30 pm Monday	11 May 2015	562,000
37	2	**Ed Kavalee**, Sarah Harris, Hamish Blake, Celia Pacquola, Glenn Robbins	Todd McKenney	8:30 pm Monday	18 May 2015	625,000
38	3	Ed Kavalee, Joel Creasey, Dave Hughes, Kate Langbroek, **Peter Helliar**	Archie Thompson	8:30 pm Monday	25 May 2015	624,000
39	4	**Ed Kavalee**, Jane Kennedy, Mick Molloy, Celia Pacquola, Sam Pang	N/A	8:30 pm Monday	1 June 2015	566,000
40	5	Ed Kavalee, Glenn Robbins, Akmal Saleh, **Neroli Meadows**, Sam Pang	George Calombaris	8:30 pm Monday	8 June 2015	638,000
41	6	**Ed Kavalee**, Luke McGregor, Troy Kinne, Kate Langbroek, Sam Pang	Alex Perry	8:30 pm Monday	15 June 2015	592,000
42	7	Ed Kavalee, Chrissie Swan, Mick Molloy, **Kitty Flanagan**, Sam Pang	Alan Fletcher	8:30 pm Monday	22 June 2015	613,000
43	8	Ed Kavalee, **Jane Kennedy**, Marty Sheargold, Celia Pacquola, Sam Pang	Adam Gilchrist	8:30 pm Monday	29 June 2015	589,000
44	9	**Ed Kavalee**, Sarah Harris, Hamish Blake, Neroli Meadows, Glenn Robbins	Alex Sinadinovic, Grant Denyer	8:30 pm Monday	6 July 2015	673,000
45	10	Ed Kavalee, Luke McGregor, **Peter Helliar**, Monty Diamond, Sam Pang	Tiffiny Hall	8:30 pm Monday	13 July 2015	712,000
Note: Jane Kennedy replaced Tom Gleisner as host as he was stuck in Bali during filming due to volcanic ash.
46	11	Ed Kavalee, Michala Banas, Dave Hughes, **Kate Langbroek**, Sam Pang	Mel McLaughlin	8:30 pm Monday	20 July 2015	628,000
47	12	Ed Kavalee, Jane Kennedy, Santo Cilauro, Celia Pacquola, **Sam Pang**	Adam Liaw, Sharni Layton	10:00 pm Monday (Note: Season 3, Episode 12 aired at the later time slot of 10.00pm due to the Grand Final of MasterChef Australia.)	27 July 2015	653,000
48	13	Ed Kavalee, Abby Coleman, Mick Molloy, **Fifi Box**, Sam Pang	Osher Günsberg	9:00 pm Monday	3 August 2015	661,000
49	14	Ed Kavalee, Kate Langbroek, Glenn Robbins, **Kitty Flanagan**, Sam Pang	Christopher Pyne, Joni Hodson	8:30 pm Monday	10 August 2015	601,000
50	15	Ed Kavalee, **Jane Kennedy**, Andy Lee, Monty Diamond, Sam Pang	Gary Mehigan, Jacinda Gugliemino	8:30 pm Monday	17 August 2015	536,000
51	16	Ed Kavalee, Glenn Robbins, Marty Sheargold, **Celia Pacquola**, Sam Pang	Rachel Jones, Chloe McCardel	8:30 pm Monday	24 August 2015	643,000
52	17	Ed Kavalee, **Abby Coleman**, Hamish Blake, Neroli Meadows, Sam Pang	Chrissie Swan, Ebru Dallikavak	8:45 pm Monday	31 August 2015	621,000
53	18	Ed Kavalee, Jane Kennedy, Josh Lawson, **Kate Langbroek**, Sam Pang	Lee Lin Chin	8:45 pm Monday	7 September 2015	568,000
54	19	Celia Pacquola, Luke McGregor, Dave Hughes, **Michala Banas**, Sam Pang	Heather Maltman	8:45 pm Monday	14 September 2015	506,000
55	20	Ed Kavalee, Jane Kennedy, **Lawrence Mooney**, Abby Coleman, Sam Pang	Sam Wood & Snezana Markoski, Russel Howcroft	8:45 pm Monday	21 September 2015	565,000
56	21	**Ed Kavalee**, Sarah Harris, Arj Barker, Cal Wilson, Sam Pang	Sam Frost	8:45 pm Monday	28 September 2015	486,000
57	22	Ed Kavalee, Jane Kennedy, **Marty Sheargold**, Monty Diamond, Sam Pang	Russell Coight, Mark Winterbottom	8:30 pm Monday	5 October 2015	578,000
58	23	Ed Kavalee, **Tegan Higginbotham**, Lehmo, Kitty Flanagan, Peter Helliar	Fiona Falkiner	8:30 pm Monday	12 October 2015	586,000
59	24	Celia Pacquola, Glenn Robbins, **Dave Hughes**, Anne Edmonds, Sam Pang	Renee Gracie, Dave Billsborrow	8:30 pm Monday	19 October 2015	575,000
60	25	Ed Kavalee, Amanda Keller, Marty Sheargold, **Neroli Meadows**, Sam Pang	Sam Frost & Sasha Mielczarek, Michelle Bridges	8:30 pm Monday	26 October 2015	686,000
61	26	Ed Kavalee, Abby Coleman, Mick Molloy, **Cal Wilson**, Sam Pang	Michael Walker, Carla Bonner	8:30 pm Monday	2 November 2015	661,000
62	27	**Ed Kavalee**, Kate Langbroek, Lawrence Mooney, Monty Diamond, Sam Pang	Sussan Ley	8:30 pm Monday	9 November 2015	668,000
63	28	Ed Kavalee, Celia Pacquola, Hamish Blake, **Fifi Box**, Sam Pang	Leisel Jones	8:30 pm Monday	16 November 2015	678,000

=== Season 4 (2016) ===
Note: Winners are listed in bold

The show returned one week after MasterChef Australia's premiere. The show aired permanently at 8:30pm on Mondays.

No. overall	No. in season	Guests	Guest Quiz Master(s)	Timeslot	Original release date	Viewers
65	1	**Ed Kavalee**, Jane Kennedy, Marty Sheargold, Fifi Box, Sam Pang	Matt Preston, Marina Prior	8:30 pm Monday	9 May 2016	684,000
66	2	**Ed Kavalee**, Anne Edmonds, Mick Molloy, Julia Morris, Lehmo	Faye Kontos, Anthony "Harries" Carroll	8:30 pm Monday	16 May 2016	687,000
67	3	Ed Kavalee, **Abby Coleman**, Lawrence Mooney, Monty Diamond, Sam Pang	Miguel Maestre, Janet Roach	8:30 pm Monday	23 May 2016	715,000
68	4	Ed Kavalee, **Amanda Keller**, Dave Hughes, Cal Wilson, Sam Pang	Ben O'Donoghue, Mavournee Hazel	8:30 pm Monday	30 May 2016	714,000
69	5	Ed Kavalee, Kate Langbroek, **Harry Shearer**, Anne Edmonds, Sam Pang	Steph Catley	8:30 pm Monday	6 June 2016	790,000
70	6	Ed Kavalee, **Jane Kennedy**, Hamish Blake, Kitty Flanagan, Sam Pang	Craig Lowndes, Zoë Foster Blake	8:30 pm Monday	13 June 2016	676,000
71	7	Ed Kavalee, Anne Edmonds, Peter Helliar, Fifi Box, **Sam Pang**	Alex Hartmann	8:30 pm Monday	20 June 2016	773,000
72	8	Ed Kavalee, **Sarah Harris**, Glenn Robbins, Kitty Flanagan, Sam Pang	Tanya Plibersek, Kat Stewart	8:30 pm Monday	27 June 2016	830,000
73	9	Ed Kavalee, Jane Kennedy, Lehmo, **Cal Wilson**, Santo Cilauro	Ben Shewry, Jack Chambers	8:30 pm Monday	4 July 2016	803,000
74	10	Ed Kavalee, **Urzila Carlson**, Marty Sheargold, Celia Pacquola, Sam Pang	Ezi Magbegor, Kate Ceberano	8:30 pm Monday	11 July 2016	807,000
75	11	**Ed Kavalee**, Kate Langbroek, Dave Hughes, Anne Edmonds, Sam Pang	Benita Collings, Chrissie Swan	8:30 pm Monday	18 July 2016	860,000
76	12	Ed Kavalee, Abby Coleman, **Lawrence Mooney**, Celia Pacquola, Sam Pang	Katherine Kelly Lang, James Tomkins	9:10 pm Monday	25 July 2016	827,000
77	13	Ed Kavalee, Jane Kennedy, Peter Helliar, **Cal Wilson**, Sam Pang	Elena Duggan	8:30 pm Monday	1 August 2016	736,000
78	14	**Ed Kavalee**, Urzila Carlson, Glenn Robbins, Neroli Meadows, Sam Pang	Ange Postecoglou, Janey Birks	8:30 pm Monday	8 August 2016	690,000
79	15	Ed Kavalee, **Celeste Barber**, Dave Hughes, Kitty Flanagan, Sam Pang	Osher Günsberg	8:30 pm Monday	15 August 2016	733,000
80	16	**Ed Kavalee**, Chrissie Swan, Marty Sheargold, Celia Pacquola, Dilruk Jayasinha	Keira Maguire	8:30 pm Monday	22 August 2016	843,000
81	17	Ed Kavalee, **Amanda Keller**, Mick Molloy, Kitty Flanagan, Sam Pang	Chloe Esposito, Justine Clarke	8:45 pm Monday	29 August 2016	728,000
82	18	**Ed Kavalee**, Urzila Carlson, Wil Anderson, Anne Edmonds, Sam Pang	Caris Tiivel, Kiki Morris	9:00 pm Monday	5 September 2016	694,000
83	19	**Ed Kavalee**, Jane Kennedy, Dilruk Jayasinha, Celia Pacquola, Sam Pang	Rachael Gouvignon	8:30 pm Monday	12 September 2016	707,000
84	20	Glenn Robbins, Urzila Carlson, Marty Sheargold, **Cal Wilson**, Sam Pang	Richie Strahan & Alex Nation	9:00 pm Monday	19 September 2016	682,000
85	21	**Ed Kavalee**, Celeste Barber, Mick Molloy, Anne Edmonds, Sam Pang	Georgia Love, Jessica Gallagher	8:30 pm Monday	26 September 2016	635,000
86	22	Ed Kavalee, Chrissie Swan, Hamish Blake, Kate Langbroek, **Sam Pang**	Todd Sampson, Mark Skaife	8:30 pm Monday	3 October 2016	684,000
Note: Jane Kennedy replaced Tom Gleisner as host.
87	23	Ed Kavalee, Jane Kennedy, **Peter Helliar**, Celia Pacquola, Sam Pang	Jessica Marais, Jason Belmonte	9:00 pm Monday	17 October 2016	661,000
88	24	Ed Kavalee, Urzila Carlson, **Marty Sheargold**, Kitty Flanagan, Sam Pang	Brooke Jowett, Sharni Layton	8:30 pm Monday	24 October 2016	766,000
89	25	Ed Kavalee, Celeste Barber, Mick Molloy, **Anne Edmonds**, Sam Pang	Maria Menounos, Dami Im	8:30 pm Monday	31 October 2016	573,000
90	26	Ed Kavalee, **Abby Coleman**, Lawrence Mooney, Fifi Box, Sam Pang	The Veronicas, Jonathan Coleman, Donna Hay	8:30 pm Monday	7 November 2016	687,000
91	27	**Ed Kavalee**, Jane Kennedy, Dave Hughes, Kitty Flanagan, Sam Pang	Penny Wong, Tyler Wright	8:30 pm Monday	14 November 2016	849,000

=== Season 5 (2017) ===
Note: Winners are listed in bold

The show returned one week after MasterChef Australia's premiere. The show aired permanently at 8:40pm on Mondays.

No. overall	No. in season	Guests	Guest Quiz Master(s)	Timeslot	Original release date	Viewers
93	1	**Ed Kavalee**, Jane Kennedy, Marty Sheargold, Celia Pacquola, Sam Pang	Tina Arena	8:45 pm Monday	8 May 2017	839,000
94	2	**Ed Kavalee**, Urzila Carlson, Mick Molloy, Kitty Flanagan, Sam Pang	Nicole da Silva, Matt Preston	8:45 pm Monday	15 May 2017	876,000
95	3	Ed Kavalee, Abby Coleman, Peter Helliar, **Fifi Box**, Sam Pang	Myf Warhurst, George Sheppard & Amy Sheppard	8:45 pm Monday	22 May 2017	859,000
96	4	**Ed Kavalee**, Urzila Carlson, Dilruk Jayasinha, Celia Pacquola, Sam Pang	Casey Donovan	8:45 pm Monday	29 May 2017	808,000
97	5	Ed Kavalee, Jane Kennedy, **Marty Sheargold**, Anne Edmonds, Sam Pang	Melissa Tkautz, Pete Murray	8:45 pm Monday	5 June 2017	764,000
98	6	Ed Kavalee, Georgie Carroll, **Dave Hughes**, Kitty Flanagan, Sam Pang	Leigh Sales	8:45 pm Monday	12 June 2017	799,000
99	7	Ed Kavalee, **Urzila Carlson**, Merrick Watts, Fifi Box, Santo Cilauro	Hanson, Naomi Simson	8:45 pm Monday	19 June 2017	804,000
100	8	Ed Kavalee, **Amanda Keller**, Mick Molloy, Anne Edmonds, Sam Pang	Gabi Simpson, Olympia Valance	8:45 pm Monday	26 June 2017	808,000
101	9	Ed Kavalee, Susie Youssef, **Marty Sheargold**, Cal Wilson, Sam Pang	Simona de Silvestro, Alex Pullin	8:45 pm Monday	3 July 2017	843,000
102	10	Ed Kavalee, Urzila Carlson, Glenn Robbins, Kitty Flanagan, **Dilruk Jayasinha**	Samantha Stosur, Olivia Rogers	8:45 pm Monday	10 July 2017	685,000
103	11	Ed Kavalee, Jane Kennedy, **Wil Anderson**, Anne Edmonds, Sam Pang	Jessica Mauboy, Stacey Thomson	8:45 pm Monday	17 July 2017	779,000
104	12	**Ed Kavalee**, Urzila Carlson, Dave Hughes, Abby Coleman, Sam Pang	Janice Petersen	10:00 pm Monday	24 July 2017	583,000
105	13	**Ed Kavalee**, Georgie Carroll, Glenn Robbins, Cal Wilson, Sam Pang	Michael James Scott, Zara Larsson	9:00 pm Monday	31 July 2017	620,000
106	14	Ed Kavalee, Kate Langbroek, Marty Sheargold, Kitty Flanagan, **Sam Pang**	Jeff Horn, Geoffrey Rush	8:40 pm Monday	7 August 2017	626,000
Note: Jane Kennedy replaced Tom Gleisner as host whilst he was away filming Season 3 of Russell Coight's All Aussie Adventures.
107	15	**Ed Kavalee**, Georgie Carroll, Mick Molloy, Celia Pacquola, Sam Pang	Lisa De Vanna, Matty Johnson	8:40 pm Monday	14 August 2017	639,000
108	16	Ed Kavalee, Abby Coleman, **Peter Helliar**, Susie Youssef, Sam Pang	Leah Costa	8:40 pm Monday	21 August 2017	641,000
109	17	Ed Kavalee, **Amanda Keller**, Dilruk Jayasinha, Celia Pacquola, Sam Pang	Jennifer Hawke	8:40 pm Monday	28 August 2017	668,000
110	18	**Ed Kavalee**, Chrissie Swan, Nick Cody, Kitty Flanagan, Sam Pang	Richard Di Natale, Kate McCartney & Kate McLennan	8:40 pm Monday	4 September 2017	701,000
111	19	Ed Kavalee, Jane Kennedy, Mick Molloy, **Susie Youssef**, Sam Pang	Florence Moerenhout	8:40 pm Monday	11 September 2017	737,000
112	20	Lehmo, Rose Matafeo, Marty Sheargold, **Anne Edmonds**, Sam Pang	Matty Johnson & Laura Byrne, Annabel Crabb	8:40 pm Monday	18 September 2017	693,000
113	21	Ed Kavalee, **Rose Matafeo**, Glenn Robbins, Susie Youssef, Sam Pang	Sophie Monk, Kelly O'Dwyer	9:00 pm Monday	25 September 2017	579,000
114	22	Tony Martin, **Urzila Carlson**, Dave Hughes, Kitty Flanagan, Sam Pang	Meg Lanning, Rhianna Buchanan & Candice Jolly	8:40 pm Monday	2 October 2017	721,000
115	23	Ed Kavalee, Georgie Carroll, **Peter Helliar**, Anne Edmonds, Michael James Scott	Lucy Durack, Osher Günsberg	8:45 pm Monday	9 October 2017	760,000
116	24	**Ed Kavalee**, Jane Kennedy, Mick Molloy, Anne Edmonds, Sam Pang	Jericho Malabonga	8:30 pm Monday	16 October 2017	688,000
117	25	**Ed Kavalee**, Urzila Carlson, Marty Sheargold, Celia Pacquola, Sam Pang	Kylie Millar, Justin Brayton	8:30 pm Monday	23 October 2017	782,000
118	26	Ed Kavalee, Susie Youssef, **Wil Anderson**, Kitty Flanagan, Sam Pang	Sophie Monk & Stu Laundy, Anthony Callea	8:30 pm Monday	30 October 2017	725,000
Note: Jane Kennedy replaced Tom Gleisner as host whilst he was away filming Season 3 of Russell Coight's All Aussie Adventures.
119	27	**Ed Kavalee**, Rose Matafeo, Glenn Robbins, Anne Edmonds, Nick Cody	Morgan Stewart, Narelda Jacobs	8:30 pm Monday	6 November 2017	633,000
120	28	Ed Kavalee, Urzila Carlson, Tony Martin, Susie Youssef, **Sam Pang**	Sam Dastyari, Sandra Sully	8:30 pm Monday	13 November 2017	683,000
121	29	Ed Kavalee, Jane Kennedy, Mick Molloy, **Celia Pacquola**, Sam Pang	Jacqui Lambie, Simon Hill	8:30 pm Monday	20 November 2017	695,000

=== Season 6 (2018) ===
Note: Winners are listed in bold

The show returned one week after MasterChef Australia's premiere. The show aired permanently at 8:40pm on Mondays.

No. overall	No. in season	Guests	Guest Quiz Master(s)	Timeslot	Original release date	Viewers
123	1	**Ed Kavalee**, Jane Kennedy, Kitty Flanagan, Anne Edmonds, Sam Pang	Isaiah Firebrace	8:45 pm Monday	14 May 2018	808,000
124	2	**Ed Kavalee**, Susie Youssef, Mick Molloy, Celia Pacquola, Sam Pang	Joel Creasey, Lucy Zelić	8:45 pm Monday	21 May 2018	800,000
125	3	Ed Kavalee, **Urzila Carlson**, Peter Helliar, Julia Morris, Sam Pang	Greta Bradman, Adam Coleman	8:45 pm Monday	28 May 2018	816,000
126	4	Ed Kavalee, Georgie Carroll, Marty Sheargold, Celia Pacquola, **Sam Pang**	Lano & Woodley, Jo Weston	8:40 pm Monday	4 June 2018	753,000
127	5	Ed Kavalee, Jane Kennedy, Wil Anderson, **Anne Edmonds**, Sam Pang	Janine Allis	8:40 pm Monday	11 June 2018	790,000
128	6	Ed Kavalee, **Amanda Keller**, Mick Molloy, Kitty Flanagan, Sam Pang	Liv Hewson, Archie Thompson	8:40 pm Monday	18 June 2018	865,000
129	7	Ed Kavalee, **Urzila Carlson**, Tony Martin, Anne Edmonds, Sam Pang	Grant Denyer, Chloe Logarzo	8:40 pm Monday	25 June 2018	854,000
130	8	**Ed Kavalee**, Urzila Carlson, Marty Sheargold, Susie Youssef, Sam Pang	Francesca Hung	8:40 pm Monday	2 July 2018	809,000
131	9	Ed Kavalee, Melanie Bracewell, Glenn Robbins, Kitty Flanagan, **Sam Pang**	Kate Jenkinson, Jeff Horn	8:40 pm Monday	9 July 2018	696,000
132	10	Ed Kavalee, **Urzila Carlson**, Ivan Aristeguieta, Anne Edmonds, Sam Pang	George Calombaris, John Aloisi	8:40 pm Monday	16 July 2018	737,000
133	11	Ed Kavalee, Denise Scott, Mick Molloy, Susie Youssef, **Peter Helliar**	Cadel Evans	8:40 pm Monday	23 July 2018	744,000
134	12	Ed Kavalee, **Amanda Keller**, Dane Simpson, Anne Edmonds, Sam Pang	Russell Coight, Jess Liemantara	9:00 pm Monday	30 July 2018	856,000
135	13	**Ed Kavalee**, Anjelah Johnson, Marty Sheargold, Kitty Flanagan, Sam Pang	Sashi Cheliah	9:00 pm Monday	6 August 2018	661,000
136	14	Ed Kavalee, **Urzila Carlson**, Dane Simpson, Anne Edmonds, Sam Pang	Moana Hope, David Reynolds	8:40 pm Monday	13 August 2018	759,000
137	15	**Ed Kavalee**, Denise Scott, Tony Martin, Melanie Bracewell, Sam Pang	Anna Heinrich, Mack Horton	8:40 pm Monday	20 August 2018	747,000
138	16	Ed Kavalee, **Urzila Carlson**, Wil Anderson, Kitty Flanagan, Sam Pang	Barrie Cassidy, Maggie Beer	8:40 pm Monday	27 August 2018	801,000
139	17	Ed Kavalee, Jane Kennedy, **Glenn Robbins**, Celia Pacquola, Sam Pang	Josh Frydenberg, Vanessa Sunshine, Virginia Grohl	8:40 pm Monday	3 September 2018	774,000
140	18	**Ed Kavalee**, Gen Fricker, Marty Sheargold, Kitty Flanagan, Sam Pang	Lydia Lassila, Caitlin Bassett	8:40 pm Monday	10 September 2018	811,000
141	19	Ed Kavalee, Melanie Bracewell, Peter Helliar, **Fifi Box**, Sam Pang	Tenille Favios, Madeleine West	8:40 pm Monday	17 September 2018	744,000
142	20	**Ed Kavalee**, Denise Scott, Santo Cilauro, Celia Pacquola, Sam Pang	Mick & Di Kershaw	8:40 pm Monday	24 September 2018	638,000
Note: Chris Brown replaced Tom Gleisner as host.
143	21	Tony Martin, **Urzila Carlson**, Glenn Robbins, Gen Fricker, Sam Pang	Cass Wood, Jade Hameister	8:40 pm Monday	1 October 2018	580,000
144	22	Ed Kavalee, **Amanda Keller**, Marty Sheargold, Anne Edmonds, Ivan Aristeguieta	Brittany Hockley & Sophie Tieman, Jenna O'Hea	8:40 pm Monday	8 October 2018	731,000
145	23	Ed Kavalee, Denise Scott, **Dilruk Jayasinha**, Melanie Bracewell, Sam Pang	Julia Morris	8:40 pm Monday	15 October 2018	769,000
146	24	Ed Kavalee, Jane Kennedy, **Peter Helliar**, Anne Edmonds, Sam Pang	Osher Günsberg	8:40 pm Monday	22 October 2018	778,000
147	25	**Ed Kavalee**, Gen Fricker, Mick Molloy, Celia Pacquola, Sam Pang	Lisa McCune, Mel Jones	8:40 pm Monday	29 October 2018	683,000
148	26	**Ed Kavalee**, Susie Youssef, Wil Anderson, Kitty Flanagan, Akmal Saleh	Matt Preston, Caitlin Foord	8:40 pm Monday	5 November 2018	623,000
149	27	**Ed Kavalee**, Denise Scott, Marty Sheargold, Melanie Bracewell, Sam Pang	Ali Oetjen	8:35 pm Monday	12 November 2018	724,000

=== Season 7 (2019) ===
Note: Winners are listed in bold

No. overall	No. in season	Guests	Guest Quiz Master(s)	Timeslot	Original release date	Viewers
151	1	**Ed Kavalee**, Melanie Bracewell, Mick Molloy, Kitty Flanagan, Sam Pang	Angourie Rice	8.40 pm Monday	13 May 2019	787,000
152	2	**Ed Kavalee**, Susie Youssef, Marty Sheargold, Anne Edmonds, Sam Pang	Katie Robertson	8.40 pm Monday	20 May 2019	673,000
153	3	Ed Kavalee, Urzila Carlson, Glenn Robbins, Celia Pacquola, **Sam Pang**	Conrad Sewell	8.40 pm Monday	27 May 2019	741,000
154	4	Ed Kavalee, **Amanda Keller**, Peter Helliar, Gen Fricker, Sam Pang	Scotty James, Myf Warhurst	8.40 pm Monday	3 June 2019	707,000
155	5	Ed Kavalee, Denise Scott, Tony Martin, **Anne Edmonds**, Sam Pang	Meg Lanning	9.00 pm Monday	10 June 2019	675,000
156	6	Ed Kavalee, Ash London, Marty Sheargold, **Melanie Bracewell**, Sam Pang	Sophie Wright, Damien Fleming	8.40 pm Monday	17 June 2019	718,000
157	7	**Ed Kavalee**, Urzila Carlson, Lloyd Langford, Kitty Flanagan, Sam Pang	Vicky Pattison, Costa Georgiadis	8.40 pm Monday	24 June 2019	750,000
158	8	Ed Kavalee, Urzila Carlson, **Dilruk Jayasinha**, Anne Edmonds, Hayley Sproull	Priya Serrao, Jo Weston	8.40 pm Monday	1 July 2019	704,000
159	9	Tony Martin, Melanie Bracewell, **Glenn Robbins**, Kitty Flanagan, Ivan Aristeguieta	Tasia Zalar, Georgie Tunny	8.30 pm Monday	8 July 2019	598,000
160	10	Ed Kavalee, Denise Scott, **Peter Helliar**, Celia Pacquola, Sam Pang	Gary Mehigan	8.40 pm Monday	15 July 2019	703,000
Note: Chrissie Swan replaced Tom Gleisner as host.
161	11	**Ed Kavalee**, Abby Coleman, Marty Sheargold, Ash London, Sam Pang	Belinda Sharpe, Ricardo Gonçalves	9.00 pm Monday	22 July 2019	668,000
162	12	Ed Kavalee, **Amanda Keller**, Mick Molloy, Kitty Flanagan, Sam Pang	Sam Neill, Larissa Takchi	9.00 pm Monday	29 July 2019	673,000
163	13	Ed Kavalee, Denise Scott, Tony Martin, **Ash London**, Sam Pang	Matt Agnew	8.40 pm Monday	5 August 2019	650,000
164	14	**Ed Kavalee**, Urzila Carlson, Dane Simpson, Melanie Bracewell, Sam Pang	Sally Pearson, Gary Anderson	8.40 pm Monday	12 August 2019	735,000
165	15	**Ed Kavalee**, Hayley Sproull, Peter Helliar, Kitty Flanagan, Sam Pang	Vakoo Kauapirura, Brian McCarty	8.40 pm Monday	19 August 2019	736,000
166	16	Ed Kavalee, **Susie Youssef**, Lloyd Langford, Ash London, Sam Pang	Christie Whelan Browne, Ezi Magbegor	8.40 pm Monday	26 August 2019	780,000
167	17	**Ed Kavalee**, Abby Coleman, Marty Sheargold, Anne Edmonds, Sam Pang	Robyn Lawley, Ruth Vogelsang	8.40 pm Monday	2 September 2019	747,000
168	18	Ed Kavalee, **Amanda Keller**, Lloyd Langford, Hayley Sproull, Sam Pang	Tiffiny Hall, Simon Black	8.40 pm Monday	9 September 2019	819,000
169	19	**Ed Kavalee**, Urzila Carlson, Tim McDonald, Kitty Flanagan, Sam Pang	Dannii Minogue, Benedicte Bemet	8.40 pm Monday	16 September 2019	826,000
170	20	**Ed Kavalee**, Geraldine Hickey, Glenn Robbins, Celia Pacquola, Sam Pang	Matt Agnew & Chelsie McLeod, Luke Toki	8.45 pm Monday	23 September 2019	823,000
171	21	Ed Kavalee, Denise Scott, **Marty Sheargold**, Anne Edmonds, Dave O'Neil	Lucy Durack	8.45 pm Monday	30 September 2019	819,000
172	22	Ed Kavalee, Melanie Bracewell, **Lawrence Mooney**, Kitty Flanagan, Sam Pang	Angie Kent, Bayley Hall	8.45 pm Monday	7 October 2019	823,000
173	23	**Ed Kavalee**, Urzila Carlson, Mick Molloy, Celia Pacquola, Sam Pang	Ksenija Lukich, Olympia Valance	8.45 pm Monday	14 October 2019	946,000
174	24	Tony Martin, Melanie Bracewell, Marty Sheargold, **Ash London**, Sam Pang	Thelma Plum, Toby Price	8.40 pm Monday	21 October 2019	926,000
175	25	**Ed Kavalee**, Urzila Carlson, Glenn Robbins, Hayley Sproull, Sam Pang	Rob Mills, Kelsey-Lee Barber	8.40 pm Monday	28 October 2019	816,000
Note: Chrissie Swan replaced Tom Gleisner as host.
176	26	**Ed Kavalee**, Denise Scott, Tim McDonald, Kitty Flanagan, Lloyd Langford	Francesca Cumani, Paul Feig	8.40 pm Monday	4 November 2019	611,000
177	27	Ed Kavalee, Geraldine Hickey, **Marty Sheargold**, Anne Edmonds, Sam Pang	Melissa Leong, Jessica Fox	8.40 pm Monday	11 November 2019	754,000
178	28	Ed Kavalee, **Urzila Carlson**, Peter Helliar, Hayley Sproull, Sam Pang	Angie Kent & Carlin Sterritt, Elise Kellond-Knight	8.40 pm Monday	18 November 2019	825,000

=== Season 8 (2020) ===
Note: Winners are listed in bold

No. overall	No. in season	Guests	Guest Quiz Master(s)	Timeslot	Original release date	Viewers
180	1	**Ed Kavalee**, Urzila Carlson, Marty Sheargold, Kitty Flanagan, Sam Pang	Malcolm Turnbull	8:45 pm Monday	4 May 2020	934,000
181	2	**Ed Kavalee**, Melanie Bracewell, Lloyd Langford, Celia Pacquola, Sam Pang	Bobby Berk	8:50 pm Monday	11 May 2020	868,000
182	3	Ed Kavalee, **Amanda Keller**, Glenn Robbins, Kitty Flanagan, Sam Pang	Kate Langbroek	8:40 pm Monday	18 May 2020	881,000
183	4	Ed Kavalee, Hayley Sproull, Mick Molloy, **Anne Edmonds**, Sam Pang	Dorit Kemsley	8:40 pm Monday	25 May 2020	815,000
184	5	Ed Kavalee, Urzila Carlson, **Lloyd Langford**, Celia Pacquola, Sam Pang	Belinda Bromilow	8:40 pm Monday	1 June 2020	812,000
185	6	**Ed Kavalee**, Denise Scott, Marty Sheargold, Melanie Bracewell, Sam Pang	Jock Zonfrillo	8:40 pm Monday	8 June 2020	769,000
186	7	Ed Kavalee, **Geraldine Hickey**, Peter Helliar, Kitty Flanagan, Sam Pang	Ellie Gonsalves	8:40 pm Monday	15 June 2020	802,000
187	8	**Ed Kavalee**, Melanie Bracewell, Tim McDonald, Celia Pacquola, Sam Pang	Daria Gavrilova	8:40 pm Monday	22 June 2020	787,000
188	9	**Ed Kavalee**, Urzila Carlson, Marty Sheargold, Kitty Flanagan, Sam Pang	Kyah Simon	8:40 pm Monday	29 June 2020	824,000
189	10	Ed Kavalee, Hayley Sproull, **Glenn Robbins**, Anne Edmonds, Sam Pang	Sayani Gupta	8:40 pm Monday	6 July 2020	762,000
190	11	Ed Kavalee, Denise Scott, Tony Martin, **Celia Pacquola**, Sam Pang	Sarah Cooper	8:45 pm Monday	13 July 2020	853,000
191	12	Tim McDonald, Geraldine Hickey, Melanie Bracewell, Lloyd Langford, **Sam Pang**	Abbie Chatfield	9:25 pm Monday	20 July 2020	771,000
192	13	Ed Kavalee, **Amanda Keller**, Mick Molloy, Kitty Flanagan, Peter Helliar	Bridget Helliar	9:00 pm Monday	27 July 2020	597,000
193	14	Ed Kavalee, Melanie Bracewell, **Marty Sheargold**, Celia Pacquola, Sam Pang	Gabi Simpson	8:40 pm Monday	3 August 2020	579,000
194	15	Ed Kavalee, Hayley Sproull, Tony Martin, **Anne Edmonds**, Sam Pang	Osher Günsberg	8:50 pm Monday	10 August 2020	623,000
195	16	Ed Kavalee, Urzila Carlson, Glenn Robbins, **Ash London**, Sam Pang	Julia Gillard	8:45 pm Monday	17 August 2020	712,000
196	17	Ed Kavalee, **Amanda Keller**, Lloyd Langford, Kitty Flanagan, Sam Pang	James Bay	8:40 pm Monday	24 August 2020	692,000
197	18	**Ed Kavalee**, Melanie Bracewell, Tim McDonald, Celia Pacquola, Sam Pang	Lydia Williams	8:40 pm Monday	31 August 2020	766,000
198	19	**Ed Kavalee**, Denise Scott, Marty Sheargold, Hayley Sproull, Sam Pang	John Millman	8:40 pm Monday	7 September 2020	764,000
199	20	Ed Kavalee, **Ash London**, Lloyd Langford, Kitty Flanagan, Sam Pang	Tristan MacManus	8:40 pm Monday	14 September 2020	767,000
200	21	**Ed Kavalee**, Melanie Bracewell, Tony Martin, Celia Pacquola, Sam Pang	Daniel Ricciardo	8:40 pm Monday	21 September 2020	572,000
201	22	Ed Kavalee, Hayley Sproull, Hamish Blake, **Anne Edmonds**, Sam Pang	Charlotte Crosby	9:00 pm Monday	28 September 2020	636,000
202	23	Ed Kavalee, Urzila Carlson, **Glenn Robbins**, Kitty Flanagan, Tim McDonald	Tim Paine	8:40 pm Monday	5 October 2020	599,000
203	24	Ed Kavalee, Abby Coleman, **Marty Sheargold**, Melanie Bracewell, Sam Pang	Elly & Becky Miles	8:45 pm Monday	12 October 2020	628,000
204	25	Ed Kavalee, **Susie Youssef**, Tony Martin, Celia Pacquola, Sam Pang	Luke Bracey	8:40 pm Monday	19 October 2020	735,000
205	26	Tim McDonald, **Urzila Carlson**, Lloyd Langford, Ash London, Sam Pang	Guy Sebastian	8:40 pm Monday	26 October 2020	612,000
206	27	**Ed Kavalee**, Hayley Sproull, Mick Molloy, Cal Wilson, Sam Pang	Anthony Scaramucci	8:35 pm Monday	2 November 2020	642,000
207	28	Ed Kavalee, Abby Coleman, **Peter Helliar**, Celia Pacquola, Sam Pang	Chas Licciardello	9:00 pm Monday	9 November 2020	620,000
208	29	Ed Kavalee, Urzila Carlson, Tony Martin, **Amanda Keller**, Sam Pang	Ali Brigginshaw	8:30 pm Monday	16 November 2020	617,000

=== Season 9 (2021) ===
Note: Winners are listed in bold

No. overall	No. in season	Guests	Guest Quiz Master(s)	Timeslot	Original release date	Viewers
210	1	**Ed Kavalee**, Melanie Bracewell, Marty Sheargold, Celia Pacquola, Sam Pang	Josh Lawson	8:40 pm Monday	3 May 2021	732,000
211	2	**Ed Kavalee**, Melanie Bracewell, Aaron Chen, Anne Edmonds, Sam Pang	Nicola McDermott	8:40 pm Monday	10 May 2021	749,000
212	3	Ed Kavalee, **Melanie Bracewell**, Tim McDonald, Kitty Flanagan, Sam Pang	Art Simone	8.40 pm Monday	17 May 2021	654,000
213	4	Ed Kavalee, Melanie Bracewell, Lloyd Langford, **Urzila Carlson**, Sam Pang	Brooke Blurton	8.40 pm Monday	24 May 2021	731,000
214	5	Ed Kavalee, Cal Wilson, **Marty Sheargold**, Kitty Flanagan, Sam Pang	Angourie Rice	8.40 pm Monday	31 May 2021	749,000
215	6	Ed Kavalee, Alex Ward, **Tim McDonald**, Celia Pacquola, Sam Pang	Owain Wyn Evans	8.40 pm Monday	7 June 2021	709,000
216	7	Ed Kavalee, Anne Edmonds, Tony Martin, Kitty Flanagan, **Geraldine Hickey**	David Hallberg	8.40 pm Monday	14 June 2021	650,000
217	8	**Ed Kavalee**, Alex Ward, Mick Molloy, Kitty Flanagan, Sam Pang	Poppy Starr Olsen	8.40 pm Monday	21 June 2021	727,000
218	9	Tim McDonald, Anne Edmonds, **Glenn Robbins**, Celia Pacquola, Sam Pang	Melissa Leong	8.40 pm Monday	28 June 2021	659,000
219	10	Ed Kavalee, Denise Scott, Lloyd Langford, **Celia Pacquola**, Andy Lee	Norman Swan, Thomas Glover	8.40 pm Monday	5 July 2021	657,000
220	11	Ed Kavalee, Hayley Sproull, **Peter Helliar**, Melanie Bracewell, Sam Pang	Aunty Donna	9.00 pm Monday	12 July 2021	674,000
221	12	Ed Kavalee, Alex Ward, **Marty Sheargold**, Kitty Flanagan, Sam Pang	Baker Boy	9.00 pm Monday	19 July 2021	744,000
Note: Chrissie Swan replaced Tom Gleisner as guest host.
222	13	Ed Kavalee, Melanie Bracewell, Tim McDonald, Celia Pacquola, **Sam Pang**	Kitwana Clark	9.00 pm Monday	26 July 2021	577,000
223	14	Ed Kavalee, Anne Edmonds, Glenn Robbins, Kitty Flanagan, **Marty Sheargold**	Maddy Tyers	8.40 pm Monday	2 August 2021	477,000
224	15	Ed Kavalee, Denise Scott, **Lloyd Langford**, Celia Pacquola, Sam Pang	Geraldine Viswanathan	8.40 pm Monday	9 August 2021	603,000
225	16	**Ed Kavalee**, Alex Ward, Mick Molloy, Anne Edmonds, Sam Pang	Katie Robertson, Nicola McDermott	8.40 pm Monday	16 August 2021	712,000
226	17	**Ed Kavalee**, Kate Langbroek, Tony Martin, Melanie Bracewell, Sam Pang	Keegan Palmer	8.40 pm Monday	23 August 2021	664,000
227	18	Ed Kavalee, **Anne Edmonds**, Luke McGregor, Kitty Flanagan, Sam Pang	N/A	8.40 pm Monday	30 August 2021	637,000
228	19	**Ed Kavalee**, Denise Scott, Dilruk Jayasinha, Celia Pacquola, Sam Pang	Jimmy Nicholson & Holly Kingston	8.40 pm Monday	6 September 2021	704,000
229	20	Ed Kavalee, Emma Holland, **Peter Helliar**, Kitty Flanagan, Sam Pang	Gordi, Ellie Cole	8.40 pm Monday	13 September 2021	639,000
230	21	Ed Kavalee, Anne Edmonds, Luke McGregor, **Celia Pacquola**, Sam Pang	Dannii Minogue	8.40 pm Monday	20 September 2021	731,000
231	22	Ed Kavalee, Alex Ward, **Lloyd Langford**, Melanie Bracewell, Tony Martin	Hal Cumpston	8.45 pm Monday	27 September 2021	684,000
232	23	**Ed Kavalee**, Emma Holland, Glenn Robbins, Kitty Flanagan, Sam Pang	Gamble Breaux	8.40 pm Monday	4 October 2021	643,000
233	24	Ed Kavalee, **Anne Edmonds**, Tony Martin, Emma Holland, Sam Pang	Katrina Milosevic	8.40 pm Monday	11 October 2021	697,000
234	25	Tim McDonald, **Alex Ward**, Lloyd Langford, Kitty Flanagan, Sam Pang	Chris Boshuizen	8.40 pm Monday	18 October 2021	693,000
235	26	**Ed Kavalee**, Cal Wilson, Mick Molloy, Kate Langbroek, Sam Pang	Mitchell Hope	8.40 pm Monday	25 October 2021	695,000
236	27	Ed Kavalee, Alex Ward, Josh Lawson, Kitty Flanagan, **Sam Pang**	Michelle Payne	8.40 pm Monday	1 November 2021	561,000
237	28	Ed Kavalee, Emma Holland, Aaron Chen, **Fifi Box**, Sam Pang	Tim Omaji, Tara Rushton	8.40 pm Monday	8 November 2021	582,000

=== Season 10 (2022) ===
Note: Winners are listed in bold

No. overall	No. in season	Guests	Guest Quiz Master(s)	Timeslot	Original release date	Viewers
239	1	Ed Kavalee, Anne Edmonds, Aaron Chen, Kitty Flanagan, **Sam Pang**	Molly Taylor	8:40 pm Monday	16 May 2022	684,000
240	2	Ed Kavalee, Nikki Britton, **Marty Sheargold**, Melanie Bracewell, Sam Pang	Todd McKenney	8:40 pm Monday	23 May 2022	645,000
241	3	**Ed Kavalee**, Emma Holland, Lloyd Langford, Julia Morris, Sam Pang	Penn & Teller	8:40 pm Monday	30 May 2022	658,000
242	4	Ed Kavalee, Alex Ward, **Luke McGregor**, Urzila Carlson, Sam Pang	Liz Watson	8:40 pm Monday	6 June 2022	682,000
243	5	Tony Martin, **Anne Edmonds**, Guy Montgomery, Celia Pacquola, Sam Pang	Scott Silven	8:40 pm Monday	13 June 2022	631,000
244	6	Ed Kavalee, Nikki Britton, **Glenn Robbins**, Hayley Sproull, Sam Pang	Andrew Redmayne	8:40 pm Monday	20 June 2022	668,000
245	7	Luke McGregor, Urzila Carlson, **Mick Molloy**, Deborah Frances-White, Lloyd Langford	Natalie Bassingthwaighte	8:40 pm Monday	27 June 2022	569,000
246	8	**Ed Kavalee**, Hayley Sproull, Aaron Chen, Celia Pacquola, Felicity Ward	Melissa Leong	8:40 pm Monday	4 July 2022	598,000
247	9	**Ed Kavalee**, Emma Holland, Ray O'Leary, Melanie Bracewell, Sam Pang	Anabelle Smith	9:00 pm Monday	11 July 2022	630,000
248	10	Ed Kavalee, Alex Ward, **Marty Sheargold**, Celia Pacquola, Sam Pang	Thanasi Kokkinakis	8:45 pm Monday	18 July 2022	679,000
Note: Chrissie Swan replaced Tom Gleisner as guest host.
249	11	**Ed Kavalee**, Lizzy Hoo, Tony Martin, Urzila Carlson, Sam Pang	Carmel Rodrigues, Bridie O'Donnell	8:40 pm Monday	25 July 2022	665,000
250	12	Ed Kavalee, **Amanda Keller**, Aaron Chen, Kitty Flanagan, Sam Pang	Anthony Albanese	8:40 pm Monday	1 August 2022	581,000
251	13	**Ed Kavalee**, Geraldine Hickey, Luke McGregor, Kate Langbroek, Sam Pang	Tinka Easton	8:50 pm Monday	8 August 2022	569,000
252	14	Ed Kavalee, Lizzy Hoo, Marty Sheargold, Urzila Carlson, **Sam Pang**	Tamannaah Bhatia, Aaron Finch	8:40 pm Monday	15 August 2022	627,000
253	15	Ed Kavalee, Denise Scott, Guy Montgomery, **Melanie Bracewell**, Sam Pang	Osher Günsberg	8:40 pm Monday	22 August 2022	687,000
254	16	Ed Kavalee, Alex Ward, Ray O'Leary, Kitty Flanagan, **Sam Pang**	Briggs	9:00 pm Monday	29 August 2022	565,000
255	17	**Ed Kavalee**, Emma Holland, Marty Sheargold, Lizzy Hoo, Sam Pang	Jay Laga'aia	8:30 pm Monday	5 September 2022	547,000
256	18	Ed Kavalee, **Emma Holland**, Aaron Chen, Julia Morris, Sam Pang	Mimi Webb	8:40 pm Monday	12 September 2022	544,000
257	19	Ed Kavalee, **Denise Scott**, Ray O'Leary, Melanie Bracewell, Sam Pang	Zachary Cheng, Kelsey-Lee Barber	8:30 pm Monday	19 September 2022	324,000
258	20	Ed Kavalee, Emma Holland, Aaron Chen, Kitty Flanagan, **Tim McDonald**	Michael Ball	8:40 pm Monday	26 September 2022	506,000
Note: Hayley Sproull replaced Tom Gleisner as guest host.
259	21	Ed Kavalee, Lizzy Hoo, Lloyd Langford, **Urzila Carlson**, Sam Pang	Grace Tame, Declan Fraser	8:30 pm Monday	3 October 2022	540,000
260	22	Ed Kavalee, Alex Ward, **Guy Montgomery**, Anne Edmonds, Sam Pang	Angourie Rice	8:40 pm Monday	10 October 2022	560,000
261	23	**Ed Kavalee**, Amanda Keller, Mick Molloy, Melanie Bracewell, Sam Pang	Billy Eichner & Luke Macfarlane, Cara Honeychurch	8:40 pm Monday	17 October 2022	513,000
262	24	**Ed Kavalee**, Urzila Carlson, Tony Martin, Kitty Flanagan, Luke McGregor	Tim Minchin	8:40 pm Monday	24 October 2022	561,000
263	25	**Ed Kavalee**, Emma Holland, Ray O'Leary, Julia Morris, Sam Pang	Robert Irwin, Glen Boss	8:40 pm Monday	31 October 2022	431,000

=== Season 11 (2023) ===
Note: Winners are listed in bold

No. overall	No. in season	Guests	Guest Quiz Master(s)	Timeslot	Original release date	Viewers
265	1	**Ed Kavalee**, Geraldine Hickey, Marty Sheargold, Anne Edmonds, Sam Pang	Danielle Scott	8:40 pm Monday	15 May 2023	633,000
266	2	Ed Kavalee, **Melanie Bracewell**, Guy Montgomery, Celia Pacquola, Sam Pang	Danny Estrin	8:40 pm Monday	22 May 2023	563,000
267	3	Ed Kavalee, Alex Ward, Lloyd Langford, Kitty Flanagan, **Sam Pang**	Jamie Maclaren	8:40 pm Monday	29 May 2023	596,000
268	4	Ed Kavalee, Lizzy Hoo, Luke McGregor, **Urzila Carlson**, Sam Pang	Nina Oyama	8:40 pm Monday	5 June 2023	567,000
269	5	**Ed Kavalee**, Emma Holland, Tony Martin, Alex Ward, Sam Pang	Thandi Phoenix	8:40 pm Monday	12 June 2023	507,000
270	6	Ed Kavalee, **Lizzy Hoo**, Tim McDonald, Anne Edmonds, Sam Pang	Ameliah Scott	8:40 pm Monday	19 June 2023	515,000
271	7	**Ed Kavalee**, Bron Lewis, Ray O'Leary, Kitty Flanagan, Sam Pang	Mitch Edwards & Mark McKie	8:40 pm Monday	26 June 2023	526,000
272	8	Ed Kavalee, Urzila Carlson, Aaron Chen, **Celia Pacquola**, Sam Pang	Georgia Godwin	8:40 pm Monday	3 July 2023	604,000
273	9	**Ed Kavalee**, Hayley Sproull, Lloyd Langford, Kitty Flanagan, Sam Pang	Vidya Makan	8:40 pm Monday	10 July 2023	613,000
274	10	Ed Kavalee, **Bron Lewis**, Peter Helliar, Emma Holland, Sam Pang	FlexMami	9:15 pm Monday	17 July 2023	516,000
275	11	Ed Kavalee, **Amanda Keller**, Aaron Chen, Kitty Flanagan, Sam Pang	Fortune Feimster	8:40 pm Monday	24 July 2023	500,000
276	12	Ed Kavalee, Hayley Sproull, Marty Sheargold, **Alex Ward**, Ray O'Leary	Fatman Scoop	8:40 pm Monday	31 July 2023	362,000
277	13	**Ed Kavalee**, Emma Holland, Guy Montgomery, Kitty Flanagan, Alan Davies	Ariarne Titmus	8:40 pm Monday	7 August 2023	408,000
278	14	**Ed Kavalee**, Urzila Carlson, Marty Sheargold, Melanie Bracewell, Alan Davies	Melanie Zanetti	8:40 pm Monday	14 August 2023	533,000
279	15	Ed Kavalee, **Bron Lewis**, Tim McDonald, Julia Morris, Jason Leong	Scotty James	8:40 pm Monday	21 August 2023	521,000
280	16	**Ed Kavalee**, Alex Ward, Tony Martin, Kitty Flanagan, Sam Pang	Logan Martin	8:40 pm Monday	28 August 2023	581,000
281	17	Ed Kavalee, Emma Holland, **Peter Helliar**, Celia Pacquola, Sam Pang	Zac Wolfe	8:40 pm Monday	4 September 2023	543,000
Note: Chrissie Swan replaced Tom Gleisner as guest host.
282	18	Ed Kavalee, Mel Tracina, **Lloyd Langford**, Alex Ward, Sam Pang	Moraya Wilson	8:50 pm Monday	11 September 2023	595,000
283	19	**Ed Kavalee**, Anne Edmonds, Jason Leong, Kitty Flanagan, Sam Pang	Abbie Chatfield	8:45 pm Monday	18 September 2023	559,000
284	20	**Lehmo**, Lizzy Hoo, Guy Montgomery, Hayley Sproull, Sam Pang	Jelena Dokic	8:45 pm Monday	25 September 2023	472,000
285	21	**Ed Kavalee**, Mel Tracina, Marty Sheargold, Anne Edmonds, Sam Pang	Simona de Silvestro	8:40 pm Monday	2 October 2023	502,000
286	22	Ed Kavalee, **Emma Holland**, Ray O'Leary, Alex Ward, Sam Pang	Nova Peris	8:40 pm Monday	9 October 2023	546,000
287	23	Ed Kavalee, Anne Edmonds, **Guy Montgomery**, Urzila Carlson, Sam Pang	Emma Watkins, Nina Kennedy	8:40 pm Monday	16 October 2023	555,000
288	24	Ed Kavalee, Bron Lewis, **Mick Molloy**, Melanie Bracewell, Sam Pang	Rhiannan Iffland	8:40 pm Monday	23 October 2023	537,000
289	25	Ed Kavalee, **Urzila Carlson**, Lloyd Langford, Alex Ward, Sam Pang	Ash Hodgkinson	8:40 pm Monday	30 October 2023	589,000

=== Season 12 (2024) ===
Note: Winners are listed in bold

No. overall	No. in season	Guests	Guest Quiz Master(s)	Timeslot	Original release date	Viewers
291	1	**Ed Kavalee**, Emma Holland, Aaron Chen, Anne Edmonds, Sam Pang	Skye Wheatley	8:40 pm Monday	13 May 2024	845,000
292	2	Ed Kavalee, **Bron Lewis**, Tony Martin, Celia Pacquola, Sam Pang	Matilda Kearns	8:40 pm Monday	20 May 2024	683,000
293	3	**Ed Kavalee**, Urzila Carlson, Lloyd Langford, Alex Ward, Sam Pang	Claudia Hollingsworth	8:40 pm Monday	27 May 2024	765,000
294	4	Ed Kavalee, Claire Hooper, **Guy Montgomery**, Kitty Flanagan, Sam Pang	Alan Fletcher, Meg Lanning	9:40 pm Monday	3 June 2024	675,000
295	5	Ed Kavalee, Emma Holland, Ray O'Leary, Anne Edmonds, **Sam Pang**	Dyson Daniels	8:40 pm Monday	10 June 2024	746,000
296	6	Ed Kavalee, Alex Ward, **Marty Sheargold**, Melanie Bracewell, Sam Pang	Mariafe Artacho del Solar	8:40 pm Monday	17 June 2024	544,000
297	7	Ed Kavalee, Claire Hooper, **Guy Montgomery**, Bron Lewis, Sam Pang	Dean Lewis	8:40 pm Monday	24 June 2024	684,000
298	8	Ed Kavalee, Lizzy Hoo, **Aaron Chen**, Alex Ward, Ray O'Leary	Yual Reath	8:40 pm Monday	1 July 2024	810,000
299	9	Ed Kavalee, Maria Bamford, Aaron Chen, Kitty Flanagan, **Sam Pang**	Cayla George	8:40 pm Monday	8 July 2024	763,000
300	10	Ed Kavalee, Emma Holland, **Glenn Robbins**, Anne Edmonds, Sam Pang	Peter Helliar	9:00 pm Monday	15 July 2024	855,000
301	11	Ed Kavalee, **Urzila Carlson**, Lloyd Langford, Bron Lewis, Sam Pang	N/A	8:30 pm Monday	22 July 2024	820,000
302	12	**Ed Kavalee**, Alex Ward, Daniel Connell, Kitty Flanagan, Sam Pang	Nikki Webster	8:30 pm Monday	29 July 2024	564,000
303	13	**Ed Kavalee**, Claire Hooper, Tommy Little, Anne Edmonds, Sam Pang	Chrishell Stause	8:30 pm Monday	5 August 2024	566,000
304	14	**Ed Kavalee**, Felicity Ward, Lloyd Langford, Kitty Flanagan, Sam Pang	Katherine Bennell-Pegg	9:10 pm Monday	12 August 2024	602,000
305	15	Ed Kavalee, Urzila Carlson, Marty Sheargold, **Anne Edmonds**, Ivan Aristeguieta	N/A	8:40 pm Monday	19 August 2024	744,000
306	16	Mel Tracina, Alex Ward, **Peter Helliar**, Kitty Flanagan, Sam Pang	Tyroe Muhafidin, Leon Wadham	8:40 pm Monday	26 August 2024	772,000
307	17	Tony Martin, Lizzy Hoo, Ray O'Leary, Anne Edmonds, **Sam Pang**	Kim Garth	8:40 pm Monday	2 September 2024	726,000
Note: Ed Kavalee replaced Tom Gleisner as host.
308	18	Ed Kavalee, Celia Pacquola, **Hayley Sproull**, David Walliams, Sam Pang	Zoe Creed	9:00 pm Monday	9 September 2024	794,000
Note: Grant Denyer replaced Tom Gleisner as host.
309	19	Ed Kavalee, Urzila Carlson, Lloyd Langford, **Alex Ward**, Sam Pang	Lily LaTorre	8:40 pm Monday	16 September 2024	772,000
Note: Robert Irwin replaced Tom Gleisner as host.
310	20	Ed Kavalee, Mel Tracina, Guy Montgomery, Emma Holland, **Sam Pang**	Chas Licciardello	8:40 pm Monday	23 September 2024	674,000
311	21	**Ed Kavalee**, Urzila Carlson, Ray O'Leary, Bron Lewis, Tommy Little	Radha Mitchell	8:40 pm Monday	30 September 2024	715,000
312	22	**Ed Kavalee**, Sashi Perera, Daniel Connell, Kitty Flanagan, Sam Pang	Melissa Leong, Aziz Behich	8:40 pm Monday	7 October 2024	695,000
313	23	**Ed Kavalee**, Alex Ward, Mick Molloy, Melanie Bracewell, Sam Pang	Felix Cameron	8:50 pm Monday	14 October 2024	724,000
314	24	Ed Kavalee, Aisling Bea, **Guy Montgomery**, Celia Pacquola, Sam Pang	Missy Morgan	8:40 pm Monday	21 October 2024	729,000

=== Season 13 (2025) ===
Note: Winners are listed in bold

No. overall	No. in season	Guests	Guest Quiz Master(s)	Timeslot	Original release date	Viewers
316	1	Ed Kavalee, Mel Tracina, Lloyd Langford, **Emma Holland**, Sam Pang	Montana Farrah-Seaton	8:40 pm Monday	12 May 2025	822,000
317	2	Ed Kavalee, **Bron Lewis**, Peter Helliar, Kitty Flanagan, Sam Pang	Marian Keyes	8:40 pm Monday	19 May 2025	788,000
318	3	Ed Kavalee, Jen Brister, Daniel Connell, Celia Pacquola, **Sam Pang**	Poh Ling Yeow, Tara Rushton	8:40 pm Monday	26 May 2025	749,000
319	4	**Tim McDonald**, Alex Ward, Mick Molloy, Kitty Flanagan, Sam Pang	Go-Jo	8:40 pm Monday	2 June 2025	801,000
320	5	Ed Kavalee, Sashi Perera, **Guy Montgomery**, Anne Edmonds, Emma Holland	Breeana Walker	8:40 pm Monday	9 June 2025	770,000
321	6	Ed Kavalee, Denise Scott, Ray O'Leary, Celia Pacquola, **Sam Pang**	Ed Gamble	8:40 pm Monday	16 June 2025	803,000
322	7	**Ed Kavalee**, Bron Lewis, Chris Parker, Alex Ward, Sam Pang	Aiva Anagnostiadis	8:40 pm Monday	23 June 2025	717,000
323	8	Ed Kavalee, **Urzila Carlson**, Guy Montgomery, Kitty Flanagan, Sam Pang	Tricia Paoluccio	8:40 pm Monday	30 June 2025	774,000
324	9	Ed Kavalee, **Bron Lewis**, Tony Martin, Celia Pacquola, Daniel Connell	Andy Lee	8:40 pm Monday	7 July 2025	701,000
325	10	**Ed Kavalee**, Sashi Perera, Lloyd Langford, Emma Holland, Sam Pang	Sofia Levin	8:40 pm Monday	14 July 2025	791,000
326	11	**Ed Kavalee**, Alex Ward, Ray O'Leary, Anne Edmonds, Sam Pang	Astrid Jorgensen	8:40 pm Monday	21 July 2025	787,000
327	12	Ed Kavalee, Urzila Carlson, **Guy Montgomery**, Kitty Flanagan, Sam Pang	Casey Donovan	8:40 pm Monday	28 July 2025	783,000
328	13	**Ed Kavalee**, Denise Scott, Chris Parker, Alex Ward, Daniel Connell	Annie Maynard	8:50 pm Monday	4 August 2025	665,000
329	14	Ed Kavalee, Melanie Bracewell, **Mick Molloy**, Celia Pacquola, Sam Pang	Sean Keenan	9:00 pm Monday	11 August 2025	761,000
330	15	Ed Kavalee, Lizzy Hoo, Tony Martin, Kitty Flanagan, **Sam Pang**	Ellie Cole	9:00 pm Monday	18 August 2025	706,000
331	16	Ed Kavalee, **Urzila Carlson**, Rhys Nicholson, Anne Edmonds, Sam Pang	Lexie Brant	9:00 pm Monday	25 August 2025	644,000
332	17	**Tim McDonald**, Emma Holland, Peter Helliar, Kitty Flanagan, Sam Pang	Jason Waterhouse	8:40 pm Monday	1 September 2025	707,000
333	18	Tommy Little, Bron Lewis, Lloyd Langford, **Melanie Bracewell**, Sam Pang	Zan Rowe	9:00 pm Monday	8 September 2025	707,000
Note: Ed Kavalee replaced Tom Gleisner as host.
334	19	Ed Kavalee, Lizzy Hoo, Peter Helliar, Celia Pacquola, **Sam Pang**	Olivia Swann	8:40 pm Monday	15 September 2025	667,000
Note: Stephen Curry replaced Tom Gleisner as host.
335	20	**Ed Kavalee**, Urooj Ashfaq, Ray O'Leary, Anne Edmonds, Sam Pang	Tim Minchin	8:40 pm Monday	22 September 2025	609,000
Note: Hayley Sproull replaced Tom Gleisner as host.
336	21	Ed Kavalee, Urooj Ashfaq, **Glenn Robbins**, Alex Ward, Emma Holland	Richard Harris	8:40 pm Monday	29 September 2025	751,000
337	22	Ed Kavalee, Denise Scott, **Chris Parker**, Kitty Flanagan, Sam Pang	Rosie O'Donnell	8:40 pm Monday	6 October 2025	641,000

=== Season 14 (2026) ===
Note: Winners are listed in bold

No. overall	No. in season	Guests	Guest Quiz Master(s)	Timeslot	Original release date	Viewers
338	1	Ed Kavalee, Anne Edmonds, **Peter Helliar**, Kitty Flanagan, Sam Pang	Angourie Rice	8:40 pm Monday	4 May 2026	820,000
339	2	**Ed Kavalee**, Melanie Bracewell, Ray O'Leary, Olga Koch, Sam Pang	Jakara Anthony	8:40 pm Monday	11 May 2026	815,000
340	3	**Ed Kavalee**, Anne Edmonds, Luke McGregor, Denise Scott, Sam Pang	Daniel MacPherson	8:40 pm Monday	18 May 2026	771,000
341	4	Ed Kavalee, **Urzila Carlson**, Lloyd Langford, Alex Ward, Sam Pang	Jock Landale	8:40 pm Monday	25 May 2026	719,000
342	5	Ed Kavalee, Bron Lewis, **Chris Parker**, Lizzy Hoo, Sam Pang	Lucy Durack	8:40 pm Monday	1 June 2026	774,000
343	6	Ed Kavalee, Celia Pacquola, **Guy Montgomery**, Emma Holland, Sam Pang	Santo Cilauro	8:40 pm Monday	8 June 2026	705,000
344	7	Ed Kavalee, Anne Edmonds, Jack Ansett, Lizzy Hoo, **Sam Pang**	Bianca Adler	8:40 pm Monday	15 June 2026	777,000
345	8	**Ed Kavalee**, Denise Scott, Daniel Connell, Alex Ward, Sam Pang	Xavier Smith, Tyler Davis	8:40 pm Monday	22 June 2026	727,000
346	9	Ed Kavalee, **Bron Lewis**, Lloyd Langford, Kitty Flanagan, Emma Holland	Lisa Millar	8:40 pm Monday	29 June 2026	715,000
347	10	**Ed Kavalee**, Urzila Carlson, Nath Valvo, Anne Edmonds, Peter Helliar	Brenna Kean	8:40 pm Monday	6 July 2026	706,000
348	11	Ed Kavalee, Mel Tracina, **Guy Montgomery**, Kitty Flanagan, Emma Holland	Will Swenson	8:40 pm Monday	13 July 2026	709,000
349	12	Ed Kavalee, Denise Scott, **Tim McDonald**, Anne Edmonds, Rhys Nicholson	Tahli Gill, Dean Hewitt	8:40 pm Monday	20 July 2026	806,000
350	13	Ed Kavalee, **Bron Lewis**, Ray O'Leary, Alex Ward, Tommy Little	Robert Irwin	8:40 pm Monday	27 July 2026	701,000
351	14	Ed Kavalee, **Urzila Carlson**, Jason Leong, Kitty Flanagan, Sam Pang	Poh Ling Yeow	9:10 pm Monday	3 August 2026	706,000
352	15	Chris Parker, Melanie Bracewell, Luke McGregor, Alex Ward, **Sam Pang**	Jemima Montag	8:30 pm Monday	10 August 2026	669,000
353	16	Ed Kavalee, Jo Gowda, Peter Helliar, **Anne Edmonds**, Sam Pang	Vinnie Gibaldi	8:40 pm Monday	17 August 2026	672,000
354	17	**Ed Kavalee**, Mel Tracina, Tony Martin, Anne Edmonds, Sam Pang	Ernesto Russo	8:40 pm Monday	24 August 2026	676,000
355	18	**Ed Kavalee**, Melanie Bracewell, Mick Molloy, Alex Ward, Sam Pang	Krissy Marsh	8:40 pm Monday	31 August 2026	679,000
356	19	Ed Kavalee, **Hayley Sproull**, Nath Valvo, Kitty Flanagan, Sam Pang	Danny Estrin	8:40 pm Monday	7 September 2026	685,000
357	20	Aaron Chen, Denise Scott, **Tommy Little**, Alex Ward, Sam Pang	Mimi Wilson	8:40 pm Monday	14 September 2026	687,000
358	21	Ed Kavalee, Geraldine Hickey, Ray O'Leary, **Lizzy Hoo**, Sam Pang	Silvia Colloca	8:40 pm Monday	21 September 2026	533,000
359	22	Ed Kavalee, Bron Lewis, **Glenn Robbins**, Emma Holland, Sam Pang	Jiaoying Summers	8:40 pm Monday	28 September 2026	682,000
360	23	Ed Kavalee, Bron Lewis, **Bill Bailey**, Alex Ward, Sam Pang	Bayley Hall	8:40 pm Monday	5 October 2026	691,000
361	24	Ed Kavalee, Emma Holland, **Guy Montgomery**, Kitty Flanagan, Sam Pang	Narelle from Youi, (Note: Portrayed by actress Pip Edwards.); Tammy Hembrow	8:40 pm Monday	12 October 2026	TBD

=== Specials ===
Note: Winners are listed in bold

No. overall	No. in season	Guests	Guest Quiz Master(s)	Timeslot	Original release date	Viewers
35	1	**Have You Been Paying Attention to 2014?** Ed Kavalee, Jane Kennedy, Mick Molloy, **Michala Banas**, Sam Pang	Matt Preston, Jacqui Lambie, Laurina Fleure	8:30 pm Monday	17 November 2014	564,000
64	2	**Have You Been Paying Attention to 2015?** Ed Kavalee, Jane Kennedy, **Marty Sheargold**, Abby Coleman, Sam Pang	Lee Lin Chin, Bill Shorten, Anastasia Katselas	8:30 pm Monday	23 November 2015	710,000
92	3	**Have You Been Paying Attention to 2016?** Ed Kavalee, Urzila Carlson, Marty Sheargold, Celia Pacquola, **Sam Pang**	Chris Brown, Bindi Irwin, Mack Horton	8:30 pm Monday	21 November 2016	757,000
122	4	**Have You Been Paying Attention to 2017?** Ed Kavalee, **Urzila Carlson**, Marty Sheargold, Kitty Flanagan, Sam Pang	Wayne Mott & Tom Walsh, Paulini, Beth Mooney	8:30 pm Monday	27 November 2017	772,000
150	5	**Have You Been Paying Attention to 2018?** Ed Kavalee, Denise Scott, **Urzila Carlson**, Kitty Flanagan, Sam Pang	Chris Brown, Fiona O'Loughlin	8:30 pm Monday	19 November 2018	810,000
179	6	**Have You Been Paying Attention to 2019?** Ed Kavalee, Melanie Bracewell, Mick Molloy, **Kitty Flanagan**, Sam Pang	Pia Miranda, Allan Raskall	8.40 pm Monday	25 November 2019	870,000
209	7	**Have You Been Paying Attention to 2020?** **Ed Kavalee**, Melanie Bracewell, Marty Sheargold, Celia Pacquola, Sam Pang	Owain Wyn Evans	8.30 pm Monday	23 November 2020	661,000
238	8	**Have You Been Paying Attention to 2021?** Ed Kavalee, Celia Pacquola, Marty Sheargold, Kitty Flanagan, **Sam Pang**	Ariarne Titmus	8.40 pm Monday	15 November 2021	731,000
264	9	**Have You Been Paying Attention to 2022?** **Ed Kavalee**, Anne Edmonds, Marty Sheargold, Kitty Flanagan, Sam Pang	Gabby Kanizay	8.40 pm Monday	7 November 2022	508,000
290	10	**Have You Been Paying Attention to 2023?** Ed Kavalee, Anne Edmonds, Kitty Flanagan, Celia Pacquola, **Sam Pang**	Tameka Yallop	8.40 pm Monday	6 November 2023	567,000
315	11	**Have You Been Paying Attention to 2024?** Ed Kavalee, **Anne Edmonds**, Ray O'Leary, Kitty Flanagan, Sam Pang	Larry Emdur	8.40 pm Monday	28 October 2024	792,000
