= Sashi =

Sashi may refer to:

== Fiction ==
- Sashi (film), a 2021 Telugu-language film
- Sashi Kobayashi, a character in the American animated TV series Penn Zero: Part-Time Hero

== People with the given name ==
- Sashi Brown (born 1976), American attorney and football executive
- Sashi Kiran, Fijian founder and director of non-profit community organisation
- Sashi Kumar, Indian media personality, film director and journalist
- Sashi Menon (born 1952), Indian retired tennis player
- Sashi Perera, Australian comedian
- Sashi Rawal, Nepali pop singer
