= Claire Hooper's House of Games =

Australian game show

- Genre: Game show
- Presented by: Claire Hooper
- Country of origin: Australia
- Original language: English
- No. of seasons: 1
- No. of episodes: 50

Production
- Running time: 30 minutes
- Production company: Endemol Shine Australia

Original release
- Network: ABC TV
- Release: 21 April – 27 June 2025

Related
- Richard Osman's House of Games

Claire Hooper's House of Games is an Australian game show hosted by comedian Claire Hooper. The show is an adaptation of British series Richard Osman's House of Games and was broadcast on ABC TV from 21 April to 27 June 2025.

== Background ==
ABC TV's 6:30 pm slot, preceding the news, was occupied by current affairs discussion The Drum until its cancellation at the end of 2023. The slot was then used for repeats of Hard Quiz. On 25 March 2025, Claire Hooper's House of Games was announced, to debut on 21 April. Contestants for the first week were Peter Helliar, Zan Rowe, Geraldine Hickey and Bob Murphy.

Hooper was given permission to differ in her presenting style to British presenter Richard Osman. She was not aware that the title would include her name, and she said that titles with presenters' names are rare in Australia.

The show was not renewed for a second series in 2026.

== Format ==
Four celebrities compete against each other on a variety of general knowledge games, for five episodes broadcast over weekdays. The prizes are objects of low value featuring Hooper's silhouette, such as a fondue set or maracas. The winner over the entire week wins a trophy.

== Contestants ==
Weekly winners in bold.

- Week 1 (21–25 April): **Zan Rowe**, Geraldine Hickey, Bob Murphy, Peter Helliar
- Week 2 (28 April–2 May): Jenny Tian, **Gyton Grantley**, Bianca Chatfield, Nazeem Hussain
- Week 3 (5–9 May): Alex Lee, **Eddie Perfect**, Emily Seebohm, Dave Thornton
- Week 4 (12–16 May): **Gillian Cosgriff**, Jessie Stephens, Costa Georgiadis, Rhys Nicholson
- Week 5 (19–23 May): **Benjamin Law**, Courtney Act, Abbey Gelmi, Anthony Lehmann
- Week 6 (26–30 May): Nina Oyama, Marc Fennell, Julie Goodwin, **Charlie Pickering**
- Week 7 (2–6 June): Sammy J, **Zoë Coombs Marr**, Damien Fleming, Myf Warhurst
- Week 8 (9–13 June): Dave O'Neil, Nath Valvo, Pia Miranda, **Matt Okine**
- Week 9 (16–20 June): **Tom Ballard**, Emma Holland, Khanh Ong, Lawrence Mooney
- Week 10 (23–27 June): **Dilruk Jayasinha**, Lucy Durack, Jamie Durie, Lizzy Hoo

== Reception ==
Debi Enker of The Sydney Morning Herald called the series "an uncomfortably static, studio-based game show in which the host and the players try hard to look like they’re having fun". Anthony Morris of Screen Hub Australia praised the variety of games on the show and said that Hooper was "assured and likeable", matching the low-stakes atmosphere of the series.
