= Metrosexual (disambiguation) =

Metrosexual is a term for a trend among heterosexual men.

Metrosexual may also refer to:

- Metrosexual (film), Thai-made in 2006
- Metro Sexual, an Australian sitcom from 2019 to 2021

== See also ==
- Metrosexuality (TV series), a television series
