= Riley Nottingham =

Australian actor (born 1991)

- Born: Riley Joseph Nottingham; 30 August 1991 (age 35); Australia
- Occupations: Actor; singer; composer
- Spouse: Declan Clifford

Riley Nottingham (born 1991) is an Australian actor.

== Career ==
He is known for his work in the children's TV series Toybox and the film Dimensions. He also portrays Dr Langdon Marsh in Metro Sexual alongside Geraldine Hickey and has appeared on The Weekly with Charlie Pickering, Tomorrow Tonight and The Gods of Wheat Street. In 2023, Nottingham was announced as part of the ensemble cast in the reboot of Thank God You're Here and in 2025, he made his American film debut as one of the leads of V/H/S/Halloween.

== Filmography ==
Years	Title	Role	Notes
2008	Wolf Shadow	Anton	Short film
2011	Dimensions	Jack	Short film
2010 – 2013	Toybox	Tom the Cowboy	TV series
2011	Carols in the Domain	Tom the Cowboy	Christmas Special
2014	We are Darren and Riley	Riley	Web series; Actor, writer and producer
2014	The Gods of Wheat Street	Constable Woods	TV series
2016	Hitstroke FM	Mattie	TV series; Actor, writer and producer
2019 – 2021	Metro Sexual	Dr Langdon Marsh	TV series (seasons 1–2); Actor and producer
2020	There After	Adam	Web series
2022	In Halves	Jed	Short film
2022	Dreamer Ballerina	Cole	Short film
2022	Wicked Women	Various	TV short
2023	Thank God You're Here	Ensemble	TV series (series 5)
2023	Strange Creatures	Nate Taylor	Film
2025	V/H/S/Halloween	Josh	Film
