= Have You Been Paying Attention? =

Australian television game show

- Title card from season six (2018)
- Genre: Game show Comedy
- Presented by: Tom Gleisner
- Starring: Ed Kavalee; Sam Pang
- Country of origin: Australia
- Original language: English
- No. of seasons: 14
- No. of episodes: 361 (list of episodes)

Production
- Executive producers: Santo Cilauro; Tom Gleisner; Michael Hirsh; Rob Sitch
- Production locations: Melbourne, Victoria, Australia
- Editor: Phil Simon
- Running time: 30 minutes (2013–2014); 60 minutes (2014–) (Both including adverts)
- Production company: Working Dog Productions

Original release
- Network: Network 10
- Release: 3 November 2013 – present

Related
- The Cheap Seats

Have You Been Paying Attention? (abbreviated as HYBPA?) is an Australian panel game television quiz show on Network 10. The series, which is produced by Working Dog Productions, is a mix of news and comedy which sees host Tom Gleisner quiz five guests (of whom Ed Kavalee and Sam Pang are permanent panellists) on the week's top news stories.

The format was adapted from a quiz segment in an early version of Cup Fever! on Triple M, when Rob Sitch heard the quiz while waiting to go on air for his live cross. After the cross, Sitch noted that the quiz "[wasn't] a bad idea for a show", and the quiz became initially part of the podcast version of Cup Fever!, before being developed into Have You Been Paying Attention.

Despite a disappointing start in ratings, and initially a change in timeslot and format, the series has proven to be a consistent performer for Network Ten, having its ratings increase with successive seasons and receiving critical acclaim. The show has won a total of 10 Logie Awards, for Most Popular Entertainment Program (2017), Most Outstanding Entertainment Program (2017 and 2019), Most Popular Comedy Program (2018, 2019, 2022 and 2023) and Best Comedy Entertainment Program (2024, 2025 and 2026).

== Format ==
The series sees the host ask guests a range of news-related questions. In turn, guests frequently give humorous or satirical answers, but only correct answers are awarded points. Guests receive 10 points for correct answers but are not deducted any points for incorrect answers. The series has also become known for its banter between its serious moderator and its not as serious contestants, as well as between the contestants themselves. In addition to questions regarding the previous week's events, the contestants are also quizzed in various other games. Generally, two of these segments are played in each episode.

=== Regular segments ===
- General questions: News events from the past week which can be grouped into the categories of Showbiz or Sport.
- Guest Quizmasters: Once (occasionally twice) an episode, a guest quizmaster (often a sportsperson or TV personality) joins to ask a series of questions, usually related to the guest in some way.
- Animal News: News events (often amusing) featuring animals.
- Individual test: Each contestant is asked an individual question, often with two possible answers.
- Around the Grounds: News stories and events from the week that are based in cities and towns around Australia.
- Rapid Recall: This is the final round and segment of the show and sees contestants required to answer as quickly as possible as the segment is timed. This is the only segment during the show where the scores are not readily shown.

==== Individual tests ====
Each episode includes a segment where contestants are each asked an individual question. A wide variety of games have been used, including:

- Over or Under: Each contestant individually watches a clip from RBT and must guess if the person is "over or under" the legal blood-alcohol limit (50 mg/100 mL of blood).
- Trash or Treasure: Each contestant individually watches a clip from Antiques Roadshow and must guess if the item the person has is worth under £1000 (trash) or is worth over £1000 (treasure).
- Going, Going, Gone: A series of questions about famous items being sold over the past week and contestants must answer what it is famous for, or which famous person used or owned it.
- Either/Or: The original variation of the above three and is used primarily to test the contestants' understanding of complicated (or amusing) names in the news. Many versions of this game have been developed, such as Rapper or Restaurant / Oui or Non / Tennis Player or IKEA Furniture etc.).
- Binge This: Contestants are shown short clips from various online streaming service programs, and must determine what happens next in each scenario. These are often in a foreign language and have unexpected twists.
- The Bold and the Beautiful: Each contestant is shown a clip from the long-running American soap and has to predict what happens next.
- Identify These International Versions of Well Known Reality TV Formats: Each contestant individually watches a short clip (and often a clip that appears weird context) from an international version of a well known reality television format. Contestants are awarded 10 points for correctly guessing the format and 10 points if they can guess the country the clip is from (e.g., if a clip from the Israeli version of Survivor was shown, a contestant would receive 10 points for answering Survivor and/or 10 points for answering Israel).

== Episodes ==
Season	Episodes	Originally aired	
Season	Episodes	First aired	Last aired
1	8	3 November 2013	22 December 2013
2	26 + 1 Special	23 February 2014	29 September 2014
3	28 + 1 Special	11 May 2015	23 November 2015
4	27 + 1 Special	9 May 2016	21 November 2016
5	29 + 1 Special	8 May 2017	27 November 2017
6	27 + 1 Special	14 May 2018	19 November 2018
7	28 + 1 Special	13 May 2019	25 November 2019
8	29 + 1 Special	4 May 2020	23 November 2020
9	28 + 1 Special	3 May 2021	15 November 2021
10	25 + 1 Special	16 May 2022	7 November 2022
11	25 + 1 Special	15 May 2023	6 November 2023
12	24 + 1 Special	13 May 2024	28 October 2024
13	22	12 May 2025	6 October 2025
14	24	4 May 2026	12 October 2026

== Cast ==
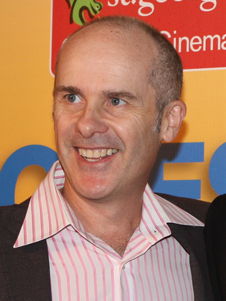
Producer Tom Gleisner regularly hosts the show, except in a few episodes.

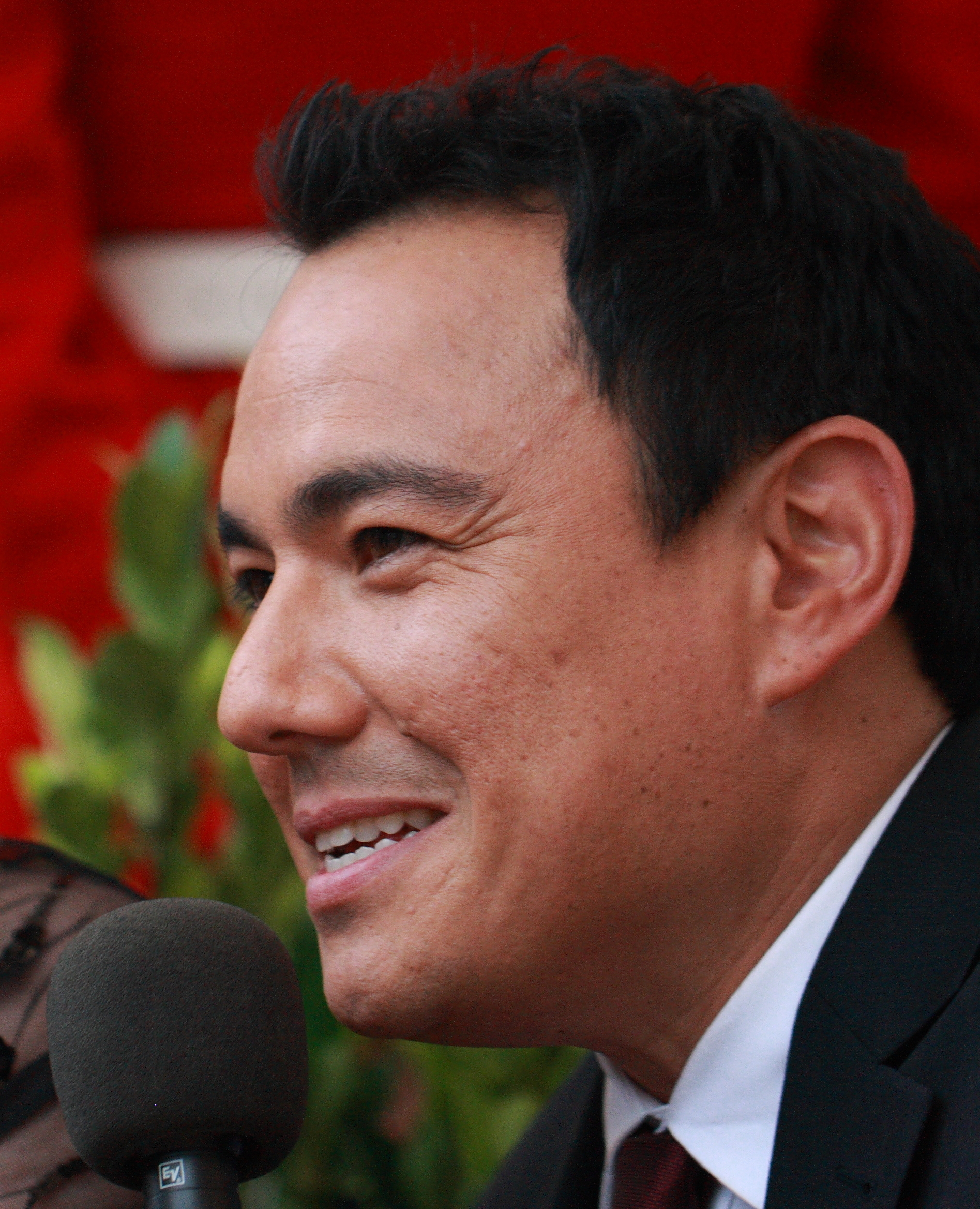
Comedian Sam Pang appears as a regular contestant.

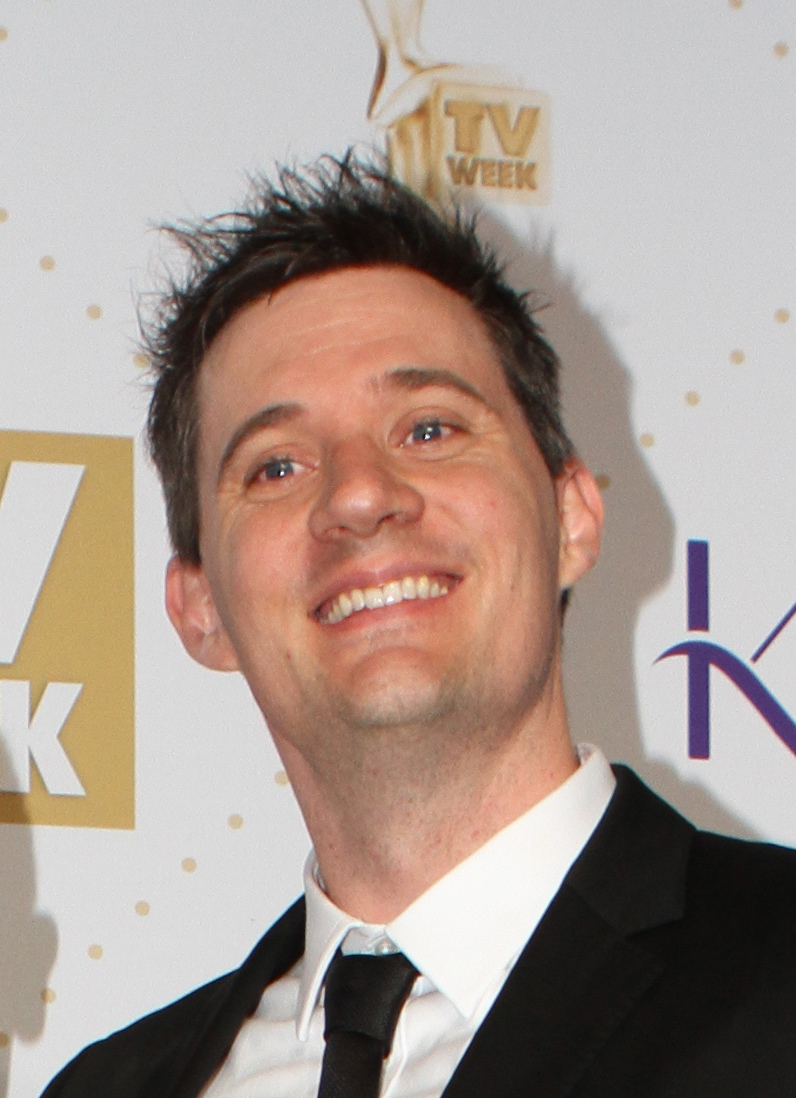
Television personality Ed Kavalee appears as a regular contestant.

=== Guest hosts ===
- Jane Kennedy (4 episodes)
- Dr. Chris Brown (1 episode)
- Chrissie Swan (5 episodes)
- Hayley Sproull (2 episodes)
- Ed Kavalee (2 episodes)
- Grant Denyer (1 episode)
- Robert Irwin (1 episode)
- Stephen Curry (1 episode)

=== Guests ===
Contestant	Appearances	Show wins
Ed Kavalee	338	114
Sam Pang	314	28
Kitty Flanagan	88	3
Celia Pacquola	76	10
Anne Edmonds	69	13
Urzila Carlson	61	22
Marty Sheargold	53	15
Mick Molloy	47	4
Melanie Bracewell	44	5
Glenn Robbins	40	11
Jane Kennedy	39	6
Alex Ward	37	3
Peter Helliar	34	14
Lloyd Langford	31	5
Emma Holland	29	3
Tony Martin	28	0
Denise Scott	25	1
Kate Langbroek	22	3
Amanda Keller	18	15
Tim McDonald	18	5
Hayley Sproull	18	2
Ray O'Leary	18	0
Guy Montgomery	17	10
Bron Lewis	17	6
Dave Hughes	16	3
Cal Wilson	15	6
Abby Coleman	15	3
Lizzy Hoo	14	2
Susie Youssef	13	3
Luke McGregor	13	1
Aaron Chen	13	1
Fifi Box	11	6
Lehmo	10	2
Ash London	8	3
Dilruk Jayasinha	8	3
Geraldine Hickey	8	2
Chrissie Swan	7	3
Lawrence Mooney	7	3
Troy Kinne	7	0
Hamish Blake	7	0
Mel Tracina	7	0
Michala Banas	6	5
Wil Anderson	6	2
Julia Morris	6	0
Santo Cilauro	6	0
Daniel Connell	6	0
Neroli Meadows	5	2
Chris Parker	5	2
Rachel Corbett	5	1
Tommy Little	5	1
Monty Dimond	5	0
Akmal Saleh	5	0
Georgie Carroll	5	0
Josh Lawson	5	0
Sarah Harris	4	1
Tegan Higginbotham	4	1
Merrick Watts	4	0
Gen Fricker	4	0
Ivan Aristeguieta	4	0
Celeste Barber	3	1
Ronny Chieng	3	0
Dane Simpson	3	0
Claire Hooper	3	0
Sashi Perera	3	0
Jason Leong	3	0
Nick Cody	2	0
Arj Barker	2	0
Andy Lee	2	0
Nikki Britton	2	0
Alan Davies	2	0
Felicity Ward	2	0
Urooj Ashfaq	2	0
Rhys Nicholson	2	0
Nath Valvo	2	0
Harry Shearer	1	1
Bill Bailey	1	1
Sara Pascoe	1	0
Jen Kirkman	1	0
Anjelah Johnson	1	0
Joel Creasey	1	0
Dave O'Neil	1	0
Deborah Frances-White	1	0
Maria Bamford	1	0
David Walliams	1	0
Aisling Bea	1	0
Jen Brister	1	0
Olga Koch	1	0
Jack Ansett	1	0
Jo Gowda	1	0
Michael James Scott	1	0

== Production and broadcast ==
The series was first commissioned by Network Ten on 25 October 2013, with the first season to consist of eight episodes which would air over the final four weeks of ratings season and first four weeks of summer ratings.

In February 2014, it was reported in an interview with host and co-executive producer Tom Gleisner that Network Ten had given the series an "open-ended" run for its 2014 season. The second season premiered on 23 February 2014 in the new timeslot of 6pm Sunday. On 9 April 2014, part way through the second season, it was announced that the show would be moved from the 6pm Sunday timeslot to 9.30pm Monday, and expanded to a one-hour format. The later timeslot would allow the series to include more adult themes. Following a six-week hiatus, the show returned on Monday 19 May 2014. Beginning on 14 July, season two moved an hour earlier to 8:30pm as a result of the low ratings of 24: Live Another Day which previously occupied the timeslot.

On 29 September 2014, it was reported that a Year in Review special had been commissioned which would air later in the year. The special aired on 17 November 2014, reviewing the top news stories of the past 12 months. The special saw the introduction of guest quizmasters to the format, which have since become a recurring feature of the series.

On 14 November 2014, the series was renewed for a third season, which premiered on 11 May 2015.

A second Year in Review special aired following the third season, premiering on 23 November 2015.

On 26 October 2015, the series was renewed for a fourth season, which premiered on 9 May 2016. In October 2016, part of the set was revamped to include illuminating buzzers and minor changes in graphics.

A 2016 Year in Review special premiered on 21 November 2016.

In October 2018, Working Dog Productions agreed with Ten Network Holdings to sell international rights to the format to the network's parent company, CBS Studios International.

Starting with the thirteenth season in 2025, episodes were made available on the series’ official YouTube channel for international audiences.

=== Filming ===
The series is filmed at Network Ten studios in South Yarra, Melbourne in front of a live studio audience. The series was originally filmed on a Saturday, but successive seasons saw filming moved from Mondays to Sundays. Filming the day prior to airing, the series aims to be as current as possible. When the show aired at 6pm on Sundays, multiple endings were filmed in case the removal of inappropriate or potentially offensive answers resulted in a different winner during post-production.

==== Impact of the COVID-19 pandemic on Season 8 (2020) ====
In 2020, due to the ongoing COVID-19 pandemic, Season 8 was recorded with only Gleisner and a handful of production crew filming the show from the South Yarra studio, with all of the contestants working from home and video conferencing in to enforce social distancing. There was also no live studio audience.

== International versions ==
Paramount Global Distribution Group (formally CBS Studios International and owned by Network 10 parent Paramount Global) owns the format for international distribution, their first non-United States format for distribution internationally.

=== New Zealand ===
A New Zealand version, Have You Been Paying Attention? New Zealand, first aired on 24 July 2019 on TVNZ 2, hosted by Hayley Sproull, starring comedian and HYBPA? Australia regular Urzila Carlson and ZM radio host Vaughan Smith.

=== Cyprus ===
In September 2020, it was announced the format rights had been sold to Cyprus, marking the second international sale of the format. The Cypriot version of the show is titled Δώσε Βάση!, which translates to Pay Attention!.

=== Israel ===
An Israeli version first aired on 23 June 2025 on Reshet 13. The show is titled מה קורה פה? which translates to What is Going On? and hosted by Shalom Asayag.

== Awards and nominations ==
Year	Award	Category	Nominee(s)	Result	Ref.
2016	Logie Awards of 2016	Best Entertainment Program	Have You Been Paying Attention?	Nominated	
2016	Logie Awards of 2016	Most Outstanding Entertainment Program	Have You Been Paying Attention?	Nominated	
2017	Logie Awards of 2017	Best Entertainment Program	Have You Been Paying Attention?	Won	
2017	Logie Awards of 2017	Most Outstanding Entertainment Program	Have You Been Paying Attention?	Won	
2018	Logie Awards of 2018	Most Popular Comedy Program	Have You Been Paying Attention?	Won	
2019	Logie Awards of 2019	Most Popular Comedy Program	Have You Been Paying Attention?	Won	
2019	Logie Awards of 2019	Most Outstanding Entertainment Program	Have You Been Paying Attention?	Won	
2020	10th AACTA Awards	Best Entertainment Program	Have You Been Paying Attention?	Won	
2021	TV Blackbox Awards 2021	Most Popular Comedy Program	Have You Been Paying Attention?	Won	
2021	11th AACTA Awards	Favourite Entertainment Show	Have You Been Paying Attention?	Nominated	
2022	Logie Awards of 2022	Most Popular Comedy Program	Have You Been Paying Attention?	Won	
2023	Logie Awards of 2023	Most Popular Comedy Program	Have You Been Paying Attention?	Won	
2024	Logie Awards of 2024	Best Comedy Entertainment Program	Have You Been Paying Attention?	Won	
2025	14th AACTA Awards	Best Comedy Entertainment Program	Have You Been Paying Attention?	Nominated	
2025	Logie Awards of 2025	Best Comedy Entertainment Program	Have You Been Paying Attention?	Won	

== Controversy ==
The series came under criticism as a result of jokes relating to the death of King of Thailand Bhumibol Adulyadej during the episode airing on 17 October 2016 (Season 4 Episode 23). As a result, Network Ten issued a formal apology to Thailand's Ambassador to Australia Chirachai Punkrasin, and the footage in question was removed from Network Ten's website, social media, and was removed from the episode for future broadcasts.

== See also ==
- List of longest-running Australian television series
