= Take 5 with Zan Rowe =

Australian podcast and TV series

- Promotional artwork for the TV series
- Genre: Talk show
- Presented by: Zan Rowe
- Country of origin: Australia
- Original language: English
- No. of seasons: 5
- No. of episodes: 32

Production
- Running time: 28 minutes
- Production company: ABC

Original release
- Release: September 20, 2022

Take 5 with Zan Rowe is an Australian podcast and TV series produced by the Australian Broadcasting Corporation that is hosted by Zan Rowe and sees artists pick five songs that summarise key moments from their life.

== History ==
Take 5 started as a radio program on Triple J in 2006, became a podcast in 2017 and finally morphed into a TV show in 2022.

== Format ==
In Take 5, Rowe asks guests to pick five songs that represent a chosen personal theme.

== Reception ==
Stephen Green of The Music said the show was "what the music industry needs right now" and praised the show for being "thoroughly modern".

== Take 5 TV Episodes ==
=== Series overview ===
Season	Episodes	Release dates	
Season	Episodes	First aired	Last aired
1	5	20 September 2022	18 October 2022
2	7	10 October 2023	14 November 2023
3	6	1 October 2024	5 November 2024
4	6	9 September 2025	14 October 2025
5	8	20 August 2026	8 October 2026

==== Season 1 (2022) ====
No. overall	No. in season	Guest	Song 1	Song 2	Song 3	Song 4	Song 5
1	1	Guy Pearce	I Want You (She's So Heavy) The Beatles	Night of the Swallow Kate Bush	Blue Bell Knoll Cocteau Twins	Lover, You Should've Come Over Jeff Buckley	Here Comes the Flood Peter Gabriel
2	2	Keith Urban	Standing on the Outside Cold Chisel	Are You Sure Hank Done It This Way Waylon Jennings	Luck In My Eyes K.D. Lang and the Reclines	I'm Coming Out Diana Ross	I Feel It Coming The Weeknd Feat. Daft Punk
3	3	Missy Higgins	Do I Move You Nina Simone	Black and White Sarah McLachlan	Breathe Me Sia	Metamorphosis One Philip Glass	Waiting For My Real Life To Begin Colin Hay
4	4	Tony Armstrong	I Feel Love Donna Summer	Otherside Red Hot Chili Peppers	Young Love Mystery Jets feat. Laura Marling	Burning Whitest Boy Alive	Losing You Solange
5	5	Tori Amos	Eleanor Rigby The Beatles	In God's Country U2	Mississippi Goddam Nina Simone	Living For The City Stevie Wonder	On Saturday Afternoons in 1963 Rickie Lee Jones

==== Season 2 (2023) ====
No. overall	No. in season	Guest	Song 1	Song 2	Song 3	Song 4	Song 5
6	1	Noel Gallagher	Nobody Home Pink Floyd	Asleep The Smiths	This Guy’s in Love with You Herb Alpert & The Tijuana Brass	All I Need Air	I Am The Walrus The Beatles
7	2	Natalie Imbruglia	Close to You The Carpenters	I Wanna Dance With Somebody (Who Loves Me) Whitney Houston	Need You Tonight INXS	Help Me Joni Mitchell	Rainbow Sleeves Rickie Lee Jones
8	3	Jimmy Barnes	Lucille Little Richard	Friday On My Mind Easybeats	All Right Now Free	Whole Lotta Shakin' Going On Jerry Lee Lewis	Respect Aretha Franklin
9	4	Mark Coles Smith	100% Pure Love Crystal Waters	New Killer Star David Bowie	I Won’t Complain Benjamin Clementine	Go Do Jonsi	Outro M83
10	5	G Flip	When I Come Around Green Day	Voodoo Child Jimi Hendrix	Black Betty Spiderbait	Proud Mary Ike & Tina Turner	River Leon Bridges
11	6	Lin-Manuel Miranda	Carta de Amor Juan Luis Guerra	Ten Crack Commandments The Notorious B.I.G.	On the Radio Regina Spektor	Under Pressure Queen (ft David Bowie)	Move On (by Stephen Sondheim) Mandy Patinkin & Bernadette Peters
12	7	The Best Of Take 5					

==== Season 3 (2024) ====
No. overall	No. in season	Guest	Song 1	Song 2	Song 3	Song 4	Song 5
13	1	Dannii Minogue	Hopelessly Devoted To You Olivia Newton-John	Into the Groove Madonna	Kids Robbie Williams & Kylie Minogue	Free Ultra Nate	Selfmade Agnes
14	2	Bill Bailey	You Really Got Me The Kinks	Big Exit PJ Harvey	Hurt Johnny Cash	Mountain at My Gates Foals	Once in a Lifetime Talking Heads
15	3	Claudia Karvan	Hold On John Lennon	Marieta Ibrahim Ferrer	I'm Sticking With You The Velvet Underground	We Up BARKAA	Thank You for Hearing Me Sinead O'Connor
16	4	Neil Finn	Quicksand David Bowie	Piano Sonata No.8 “Pathétique” Ludwig van Beethoven	Time for a Change Split Enz	Across the Universe The Beatles	Summertime Ella Fitzgerald & Louis Armstrong
17	5	Bernard Fanning	Jailbreak AC/DC	Sound and Vision David Bowie	I Wish I Knew How It Would Feel To Be Free Nina Simone	1999 Prince	Most of the Time Bob Dylan
18	6	Casey Donovan	To Be With You Mr. Big	Light On Maggie Rogers	Bed I Made Allen Stone	You Might Not Like Her Maddie Zahm	One Life James Bay

==== Season 4 (2025) ====
No. overall	No. in season	Guest	Song 1	Song 2	Song 3	Song 4	Song 5
19	1	Melanie C	Sir Duke Stevie Wonder	Everything She Wants Wham!	Waterfalls TLC	Chime Orbital	Eleanor Rigby The Beatles
20	2	Aaron Chen	Neighbourhood #1 (Tunnels) Arcade Fire	Take My Hand Matt Berry	Jerusalem, New York, Berlin Vampire Weekend	Dreams (夢中人) Faye Wong	Deeper Well Kacey Musgraves
21	3	Kevin Bacon	Happy Feelin' Earth, Wind & Fire	Little Miss Can't Be Wrong Spin Doctors	In Spite of Ourselves John Prine & Iris DeMent	Thinkin' Bout You Frank Ocean	The Joke Brandi Carlile
22	4	Lorde	Fruits of My Labor Lucinda Williams	Smalltown Boy Bronski Beat	Suzanne Nina Simone	Confirmation Westerman	Girl, so confusing Charli xcx & Lorde
23	5	Jarvis Cocker	Please Stay The Cryin' Shames	Dance This Mess Around B-52s	It's Raining Today Scott Walker	Send In the Clowns / Can't Take My Eyes Off You Judi Dench / Boys Town Gang mashup	Isis Bob Dylan
24	6	Paul Kelly	Waterloo Sunset The Kinks	Cattle and Cane The Go-Betweens	River Joni Mitchell	Just Another Day... Queen Latifah	Charcoal Lane Archie Roach

==== Season 5 (2026) ====
No. overall	No. in season	Guest	Song 1	Song 2	Song 3	Song 4	Song 5
25	1	Peter Garrett	Go Tell It On The Mountain Peter, Paul and Mary	From the Bush Warumpi Band	Dirrpi Yuin Patjulinya DOBBY	War (live) Bruce Springsteen & The E Street Band	Without Sarah Blasko
26	2	Shania Twain	Coat of Many Colors Dolly Parton	Texas (When I Die) Tanya Tucker	Hopelessly Devoted to You Olivia Newton-John	What's Love Got to Do with It Tina Turner	Respect Aretha Franklin
27	3	Darren Hayes	Life in a Northern Town The Dream Academy	Hallelujah HAIM	The Walk Home Young The Giant	O Coldplay	Two Weeks Ago Maisie Peters
28	4	David Byrne	Get on the Good Foot James Brown	Stand on the Word (Larry Levan mix) Joubert Singers	Cucala Celia Cruz	The Wilhelm Scream James Blake	Tropicalia Caetano Veloso
29	5	Jacinda Ardern	Bullet With Butterfly Wings Smashing Pumpkins	Wandering Eye Fat Freddy's Drop	Peace Train Cat Stevens	This Year The Mountain Goats	Stars Shapeshifter
30	6	Lainey Wilson	Louisiana Saturday Night Mel McDaniel	I Hope You Dance Lee Ann Womack	Lookin' Out My Back Door CCR	I'm Not for Everyone Brothers Osborne	Humble and Kind Tim McGraw
31	7	Genesis Owusu	Birthday Cake Cibo Matto	Rock Star N.E.R.D.	American Terrorist [Ft. Matthew Santos] Lupe Fiasco	All the Critics Love U in New York Prince	I Think Tyler, The Creator
32	8	Vika & Linda Bull	Halleluia Chorus (from The Messiah) Maopa Choir and Band	Gimme Shelter The Rolling Stones	Could You Be Loved Bob Marley & The Wailers	Edible Flowers The Finn Brothers	Respect Yourself The Staple Singers
