= Sashi Rawal =

Nepali pop singer

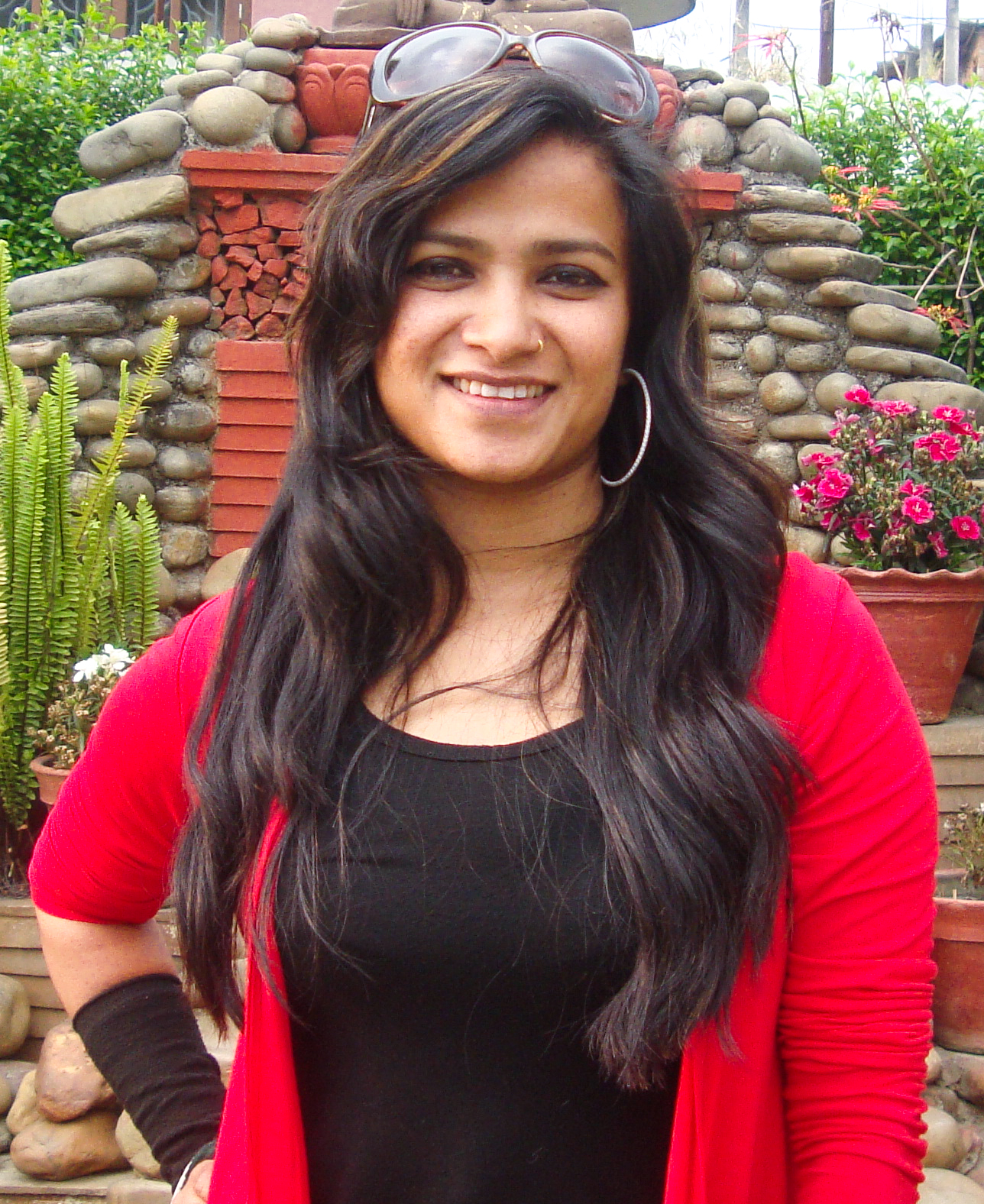

Background information
- Born: Sashi Rawal; 12 September; Kabhresthali, Kathmandu, Nepal
- Occupation: Singer
- Instrument: Guitar
- Years active: 2007 – present
- Website: http://www.sashirawal.com

Sashi Rawal (Nepali: शशि रावल) is a Nepali pop singer. She became popular with the song called Chahana sakiyo bahana sakiyo which was written and composed by Kali Prasad Baskota from her first album Entrance released in 2007. She also release her another song "Timro Haat Samai", which also focus hit in numbers of album Saathi released in 2011. She penned and composed that song by herself. After that she released song Taali Bajai Deu from album TAALI BAJAI DEU, she has gifted and dedicated this album to her mom. Rawal also involved in Melancholy, an environmental song by 365 Artists, is written, music composed and directed by Environmentalist Nipesh DHAKA in which song has been braked in Guinness World Records in entitled "Most Vocal Solos in a Song Recording" is recorded on 19 May 2016 at Radio Nepal studio.

== Personal life ==
Rawal was born in Kabhresthali in Kathmandu District to her father Mohan Rawal and mother Kanchi Rawal. She had a sibling Maheshwor Rawal. She spent her childhood to adulthood there.

== Education ==
She completed her schooling from Padma Charka Boarding School and +2 from Siddhartha Vanasthali.

== Discography ==
- Entrance (2007) (with Kali Prasad Baskota)
- Saathi (2010)
- Taali Bajai Deu (2014)

== Awards ==
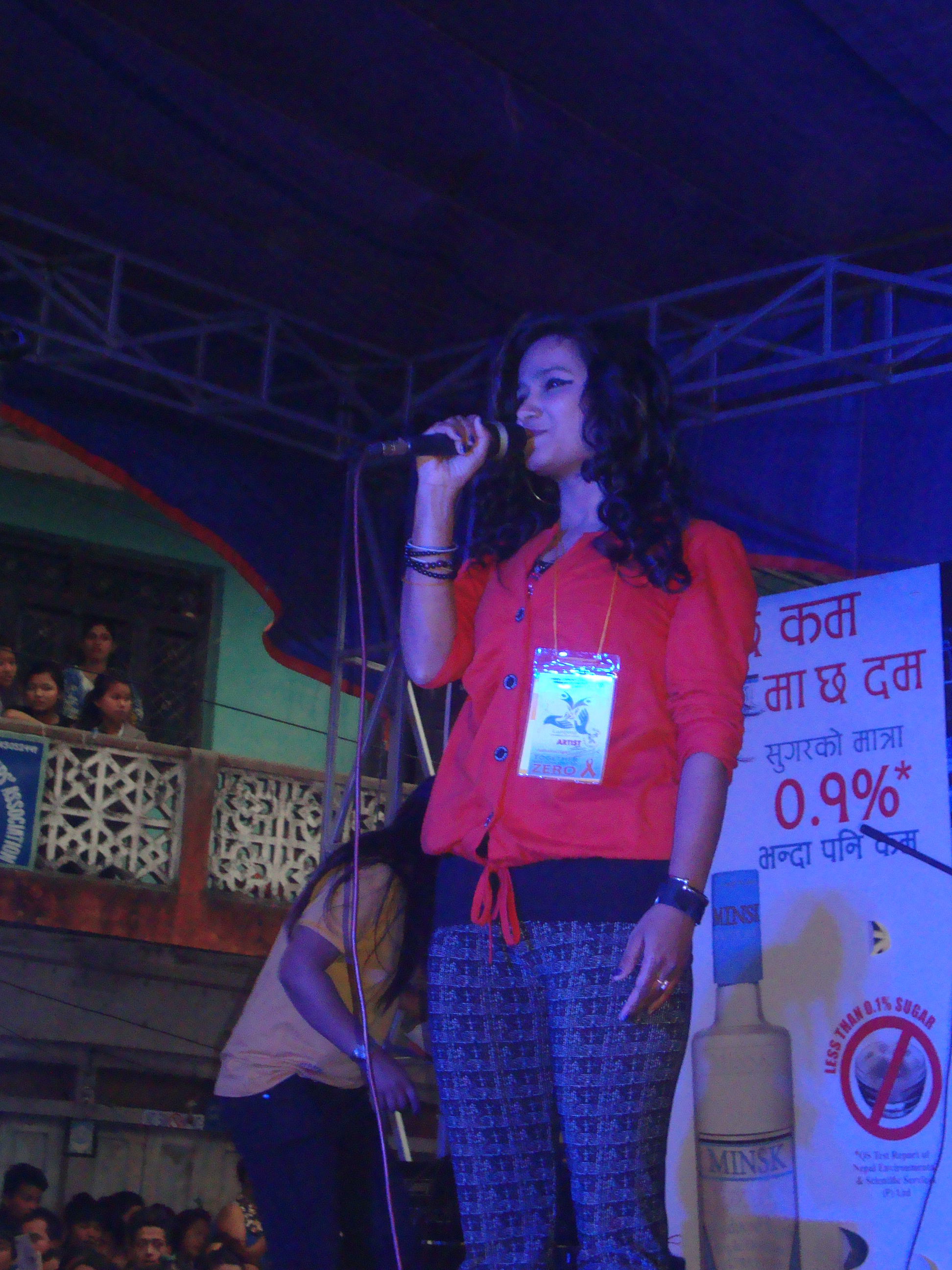
Rawal singing in a concert held at Besisahar, Lamjung, Nepal 2014.

=== Award ===
Year	Recipient	Category	Result
2005	Junior Diploma in Vocal	Gold medal in Classical Singing from Kalanidhi Indira Sangeet Mahavidhyalaya conducted under Prayag Music committee Allabhad	Won

=== Image Award ===
Year	Recipient	Category	Result
2008	Chahana Sakiyo Bahana Sakiyo	Best Pop Female Vocal Performance	Won

=== Kalika FM Award ===
Year	Recipient	Category	Result
2008	Chahana Sakiyo Bahana Sakiyo	Best Pop Female Vocal Performance	Won
2011	Timro Haat Samai	Best Pop Lyricist	Won

== Read more ==
- Ritto Ritto
- गायिका रावलको विवाह खर्च वृद्धवृद्धालाई
