= Gen Fricker =

Australian comedian and radio host (born 1989)

- Born: Genevieve Fricker; 3 November 1989 (age 36); Sydney, New South Wales, Australia
- Occupations: Radio presenter, comedian, writer, actor
- Known for: Hosting radio on Triple J

Genevieve Fricker (born 3 November 1989) is an Australian stand-up comedian, writer, actor, and radio presenter.

== Early life and education ==
Fricker was born in Sydney, Australia, and has Māori heritage. She trained as an orchestral double bassist at the Sydney Conservatorium of Music High School and University, before moving to the University of Sydney to study Art History and Psychology.

At the University of Sydney, she performed as part of student comedy group "Project 52", alongside Steen Raskopoulos among others. Later, Fricker trained at the Upright Citizens Brigade in New York.

== Career ==
In 2011, Gen Fricker was a National Finalist in the RAW Comedy Competition. She co-hosted Summer Up For It on FBi Radio with comedian Michael Hing over the summer break in 2011–2012.

Fricker first appeared on triple j as a guest on Drive with Lindsey McDougall, on Sunday Night Safran, and as a writer/performer on Tom Ballard's Chatback sketch show. At the end of 2014, she began hosting Overnights, before joining Kyran Wheatley on Weekend Arvos in 2016. In 2017, she took over the Lunch program on Triple J, formerly presented by Lewi McKirdy, before moving to the Drive program to fill in for Veronica Milsom, alongside co-host Lewis Hobba. In 2018, she was voted number 9 on Radio Today's 'FM Radio's Top 20 Funniest Women' reader poll.

Fricker has performed stand-up on Comedy Central, Just for Laughs (Australian TV series), Sydney Comedy Festival, New Zealand Comedy Festival and Melbourne International Comedy Festival. She has appeared on numerous TV shows, including Good Game, ABC TV New Year's Eve coverage, Legally Brown, Dirty Laundry Live, Have You Been Paying Attention?, and Spicks and Specks. She was also a writer/performer on The Roast. In 2014, she was selected by Reggie Watts to open for him on his Australian tour. Other credits include the Australian production of Karen O's Stop The Virgens, as well as working as an Entertainment contributor for The Sydney Morning Herald.
