= Kabhresthali =

Kavresthali काभ्रेस्थली
- Town of Tarakeshwar Municipality
- Location in Nepal
- Coordinates: 27.80°N 85.30°E
- Country: Nepal
- Province: No. 3
- District: Kathmandu District

Population (1991)
  - Total: 3,034
- Time zone: UTC+5:45 (Nepal Time)

Kavresthali is a town and former Village Development Committee that is now part of Tarakeshwar Municipality in Kathmandu District in Province No. 3 of central Nepal. At the time of the 1991 Nepal census it had a population of 3,034 and had 581 households in it.

== Toponymy ==
=== Linguistic origin ===
- Linguistic family: Sino-Tibetan / Indoeuropean
- Language: Newari / Sanskrit

=== Etymology ===
“Kabhre” likely refers to the district or region of Kavrepalanchok. “Sthali” means place, land, or settlement. Therefore, Kabhresthali can be interpreted as “the place related to Kabhre” or “the land associated with Kabhre.”

Kabhre (काभ्रे) is a regional toponym, referring to Kavrepalanchok district, likely of Tibeto-Burman/Newar substrate origin, later Sanskritized. Sthali (स्थली) means “place, site, land” and comes from Sanskrit स्थल (sthala) meaning ground, place. The toponym Kabhresthali is thus a compound name, meaning “land associated with Kabhre,” reflecting a historical or administrative link with the Kavre area.
