= Metro Sexual =

2021 Australian sitcom

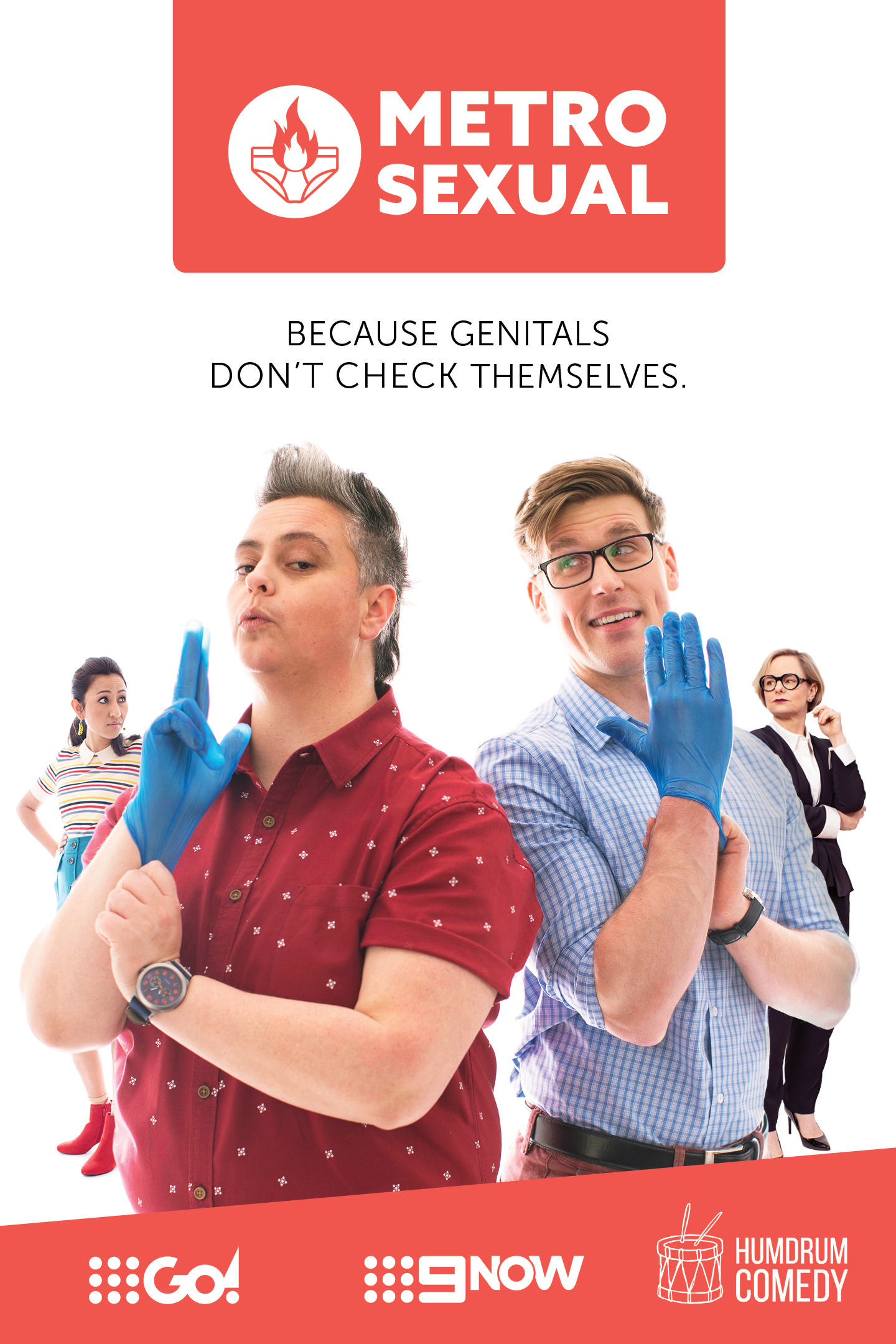
- Genre: Sitcom
- Created by: Henry Boffin; Nicholas Kraak; Riley Nottingham
- Written by: Nicholas Kraak; Henry Boffin
- Directed by: Henry Boffin
- Starring: Riley Nottingham; Geraldine Hickey; Shabana Azeez; Urvi Majumdar; Ryan Shelton
- Theme music composer: Brian White
- Country of origin: Australia
- Original language: English
- No. of seasons: 2
- No. of episodes: 14

Production
- Executive producer: Julia Adams
- Producers: Darren McFarlane; Riley Nottingham
- Running time: 10–25 minutes
- Production company: Humdrum Comedy

Original release
- Network: Nine Network
- Release: 2 December 2019 – 9 December 2021

Metro Sexual is an Australian mockumentary television sitcom created by Henry Boffin, Nicholas Kraak, and Riley Nottingham. The series aired on the Nine Network's 9Go! from 2 December 2019 to 9 December 2021. Starring Geraldine Hickey and Riley Nottingham, it follows a group of doctors working at a sexual health clinic in Melbourne, called Metropolitan Sexual Health.

Metro Sexual was the first Australian TV series with all LGBT leads.

== Cast ==
=== Main ===
- Riley Nottingham as Dr Langdon Marsh
- Geraldine Hickey as Dr Steph Huddleston
- Shabana Azeez as Yasmin Dagher
- Urvi Majumdar as Gwen Albright
- Ryan Shelton as Greg Huddleston
- Rebecca Massey as Miranda Graft

=== Guest ===
- Joel Creasey as Timothy Tanner (season 1)
- Clayton Jacobson as Bruce (season 1)
- John Flaus as Mr Petterson (season 1)
- Toby Truslove as Nurse Fletcher (season 1)
- David Paterson as Phillip Dudd (season 1)
- Francis Greenslade as Bart Finley (season 2)
- Jane Allsop as Amelia Krabb (season 2)
- Keith Brockett as Calvin (season 2)
- Joshua Monaghan as Herman (season 2)
- Oliver Clark as Julian Clairmont (season 2)

== Episodes ==
Series	Episodes	Originally released	
Series	Episodes	First released	Last released
1	8	2 December 2019	3 December 2019
2	6	2 December 2021	9 December 2021

=== Season 1 (2019) ===
No. overall	No. in season	Title	Directed by	Written by	Original release date
1	1	Schoolies	Henry Boffin	Henry Boffin & Nicholas Kraak	2 December 2019
Langdon and Steph are faced with an outbreak of syphilis in a group of schoolies. Their new boss, Miranda Graft, wants them to diagnose as many teens as possible. When this becomes a competition, the future of the clinic is jeopardised.
2	2	Friends	Henry Boffin	Henry Boffin & Nicholas Kraak	2 December 2019
The shy Steph attempts to speed along a cervical examination. However, this results in a worsening situation. Langdon is hiding from a loan shark for his student loan debt.
3	3	Oldies	Henry Boffin	Henry Boffin & Nicholas Kraak	2 December 2019
Langdon and Steph investigate an outbreak of crabs in a retirement village. Steph must get over her long-held fear of the elderly and Langdon must stop treating them like children.
4	4	Celebrity	Henry Boffin	Henry Boffin & Nicholas Kraak	2 December 2019
Steph does her best to act normal and avoid appearing weird while doing a checkup for a radio DJ she admires.
5	5	Bikies	Henry Boffin	Henry Boffin & Nicholas Kraak	3 December 2019
After Langdon's upbeat nature gets on Steph's nerves, she sends him to do a prostate exam on a bikie gang leader, testing his nerve.
6	6	Daddy	Henry Boffin	Henry Boffin & Nicholas Kraak	3 December 2019
Steph brings a group of medical students to observe Langdon's father's testicular check-up. She wants to teach Langdon about patiant privacy, but may push him too far.
7	7	Pride	Henry Boffin	Henry Boffin, Nicholas Kraak & Riley Nottingham	3 December 2019
Steph is seen as a homophobe, despite being a member of the LGBTQI community, after an out-of-context video of her burning a rainbow flag goes viral. Langdon arranges a pride celebration at the clinic as a solution.
8	8	Boys	Henry Boffin	Henry Boffin & Nicholas Kraak	3 December 2019
Graft succeeds in shutting down Metro Sexual. In an attempt to save the clinic, Langdon and his actor boyfriend Tim put on a musical. However, Steph is suspicious of Tim and his motives.

=== Season 2 (2021) ===
No. overall	No. in season	Title	Directed by	Written by	Original release date
9	1	Medical Students	Henry Boffin	Henry Boffin & Nicholas Kraak	2 December 2021
When a new dating app creates an outbreak of STI's across Melbourne, the clinic decides to get a medical student to help. But when two students arrive, Langdon and Steph must decide which one to keep.
10	2	The Pollie	Henry Boffin	Nicholas Kraak & Henry Boffin	2 December 2021
When a bigoted politician arrives at the clinic, Steph and Yasmin are sworn to absolute secrecy. But when the politician's cover is blown, Steph becomes suspicious Yasmin leaked the news. Meanwhile, Langdon coaches Greg on how best to woo receptionist Gwen.
11	3	Martha Bradbury	Henry Boffin	Henry Boffin & Nicholas Kraak	2 December 2021
Steph must keep her cool when one of her patients bears an uncanny resemblance to her imaginary childhood friend. Meanwhile, Langdon and Greg investigate who keeps defacing a graphic billboard designed to advertise the clinic.
12	4	Foreign Correspondence	Henry Boffin	Nicholas Kraak & Henry Boffin	9 December 2021
Langdon becomes infatuated with a translator, who helps him converse to a patient who doesn't speak English. Meanwhile, Yasmin suspects Steph has piles.
13	5	The Fappies	Henry Boffin	Henry Boffin & Nicholas Kraak	9 December 2021
When both Steph and Langdon are nominated for Sexual Health Doctor of the Year at an annual awards show, the two become fiercely competitive. But when Steph suspects Langdon cheated, she gets him suspended.
14	6	The Tribunal	Henry Boffin	Nicholas Kraak & Henry Boffin	9 December 2021
After Langdon's suspension from the clinic, Steph enjoys a life free of her colleague. But when she comes to miss him, she becomes his defender at his tribunal.

== Production ==
The series was inspired by actor Riley Nottingham's experience with sexual health clinics. The writers sought to use the format to help destigmatise sexual health. Filming for the show's second season took place in Melbourne in 2021 between COVID-19 lockdowns, and took 4 weeks.

== Awards and nominations ==
Year	Award	Category	Nominee	Season	Result	Ref
2021	Australian Writers' Guild Awards	Best Writing in a Comedy Series	Henry Boffin & Nicholas Kraak	Season 2	Nominated	
