= Daniel Connell (comedian) =

Australian comedian Daniel Connell

Daniel Connell is an Australian comedian.

Connell grew up in Batemans Bay, on the New South Wales south coast. He started his comedy career in Canberra before moving to Melbourne in 2010.

Connell's style of stand up comedy has been described as "effortless" and "laconic". Reviewers have described him having an "easy charm" and having "mastered the art of dry observational humour."

== Comedy festivals ==
Connell made his debut on the comedy festival scene in 2011. Connell has performed at 14 consecutive Melbourne International Comedy Festivals, as well as Edinburgh Fringe, Adelaide Fringe, Sydney Comedy Festival, Perth Fringe World, and Canberra Comedy Festival.

=== Festival shows ===
- Prairie Dog (2026)
- Box-Headed Manbaby (2025)
- Little Aussie Battler (2024)
- I'm Always Sore (2023)
- Gutless Wonder (2022)
- I’ve Had A Flare Up (2021)
- Cheers Big Ears (2020)
- Piece of Piss (2019)
- Bit of Shush (2018)
- Stacks On (2017)
- Resting Face (2016)
- The Get Out Stakes (2015)
- Dodgem Car Saviour (2014)
- Mr Personality 1988 (2013)
- Likeable Enough (2012)

== TV appearances ==
Connell has made a number of television appearances, including on the ABC in the Melbourne International Comedy Festival Gala (2025, 2024, 2021, 2019, 2017), Opening Night Comedy All Stars Supershow (2022) and Comedy Up Late (2018, 2021).

He has appeared on Have You Been Paying Attention? (Network 10 2024, 2025), The Project (Network 10 2023, 2025), The Cook Up with Adam Liaw (SBS, 2026) and acted in various roles, including in Fisk (ABC 2024) and Kinne Tonight (Network 10 2019).

== Awards ==
Connell won the prestigious Piece of Wood award at the 2025 Melbourne International Comedy Festival.
