= Zan Rowe =

Australian radio and television presenter

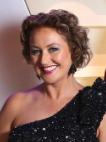
- Rowe in 2022
- Born: Susanna Rowe; Melbourne, Victoria, Australia
- Other name: Zan
- Occupations: Radio and television presenter
- Employer: Australian Broadcasting Corporation

Susanna "Zan" Rowe is an Australian radio and television presenter. Rowe is regular presenter on ABC digital radio station Double J and host of the podcast and television series Take 5. Rowe is an industry adjunct associate professor at RMIT University.

== Early life and education ==
Susanna Rowe (later nicknamed "Zan") grew up in Melbourne.

She attended RMIT University, majoring in radio and cinema.

== Career ==
=== Radio and podcasts ===
Rowe started out at SRA FM in 1996 (now SYN Radio) on a show called Run with the Hunted, before moving to the Monday drive shift on 3RRR 102.7FM presenting Transit Lounge from 2002–2004.

In 2005, she joined Triple J as weekend lunch host. In 2006, she became host of Mornings on Triple J, broadcasting weekdays between 9am and 12 noon

On 4 December 2017, Rowe announced she would be leaving Triple J and joining digital radio network Double J. In 2018 she started at Double J as host of the Mornings show.

The show is the home of her flagship feature and podcast, Take 5. The segment has featured many guests over the years, including Paul McCartney, Damon Albarn, Kylie Minogue, Tori Amos and Peter Garrett.

Rowe began the podcast Bang On with Myf Warhurst in March 2017. The podcast went on hiatus in November 2024. Rowe and Warhurst won Best Host for Bang On at the Australian Podcast Awards in 2024.

On 9 December 2025, Rowe announced that she would step down from hosting Friday Mornings on Double J, concluding more than two decades of broadcasting with the ABC’s youth and digital music networks. Her final program was scheduled for 12 December 2025, featuring a special two-hour farewell broadcast.

=== Television ===
In 2009, Rowe joined music presenter Richard Kingsmill in presenting a special edition of Rage, Triple J Hottest 100 of All Time, broadcast over two nights on the weekend of Friday 7 August 2009.

In 2015–2016, Rowe presented The Critics for ABC iview, a program on screen culture.

In 2017, Rowe was announced as one of the panelists for ABC TV's new screen review show Screen Time, hosted by Chris Taylor.

In 2017, Rowe and Charlie Pickering began hosting the New Year's Eve countdown show on the ABC.

Rowe presents a weekly music news segment on News Breakfast. After a decade presenting the segment, Rowe resigned from the role in 2024, replaced by Triple J announcers Lucy Smith and Sosefina Fuamoli.

She has also hosted various other programs on the ABC, including Double J, as well as written for the ABC about the Australian musical industry. In 2020, Rowe co-hosted weekly music program The Sound on the ABC. Rowe was one of the hosts of the ABC's 90th birthday celebration in 2022, alongside Tony Armstrong, and Craig Reucassel. In 2025 she appeared as a contestant on Claire Hooper's House of Games.

Rowe hosts Take 5 with Zan Rowe, a television version of her Double J radio segment and podcast, which premiered in September 2022. Season one included interviews with Guy Pearce, Keith Urban, Missy Higgins, Tony Armstrong and Tori Amos. Season two premiered on 8 October 2023, and included interviews with Noel Gallagher, Natalie Imbruglia, Jimmy Barnes, Mark Coles Smith, G Flip and Lin-Manuel Miranda. Season three commenced on 1 October 2024, and featured guests Dannii Minogue, Bill Bailey, Claudia Karvan, Neil Finn, Bernard Fanning, and Casey Donovan. Season four aired in 2025, and included guests Melanie C, Aaron Chen, Kevin Bacon, Lorde, Jarvis Cocker and Paul Kelly. Season five premiered on 20 August 2026 with guests Peter Garrett, Shania Twain, Darren Hayes, David Byrne, Jacinda Ardern, Lainey Wilson, Genesis Owusu and Vika & Linda Bull.

Rowe's comfortable style has been celebrated by industry and artists alike, with Bernard Fanning calling her "our beloved 21st Century Molly Meldrum".

=== Academia ===
As of 2025 Rowe is an industry adjunct associate professor at RMIT University.
