= Lizzy Hoo =

Australian comedian (born 1984)

- Born: 1984 (age 41–42); Brisbane, Queensland, Australia
- Occupation: Comedian
- Years active: 2017–present
- Website: www.lizzyhoo.com

Lizzy Hoo (born 1984) is an Australian stand-up comedian, writer and actor. She is best known for her Amazon Prime Video stand-up special Hoo Cares!? (2022). She started performing stand-up in 2017.

== Early life ==
Hoo was born in 1984 in Brisbane, Queensland, Australia. She was born to an Irish Australian mother and a Chinese Malaysian father. Her mother, Barbara Hoo, is from Toowoomba in Queensland and her father, Chan Hoo, was born in Malaysia. They met in Penang then moved to Brisbane in 1975.

Her brother, Damian Hoo was a contestant on Big Brother 2002.

== Career ==
After moving to Sydney, Hoo enrolled in comedy classes at Sydney Community College. She began performing stand-up comedy in 2017, when she was 32 years old. She went full-time as a comedian after quitting her day job as an account manager in marketing at the end of 2021. She made the NSW Raw Comedy State Finals in 2017. She was invited to perform at the 2018 Just for Laughs Festival at the Sydney Opera House.

For the 2019 Melbourne International Comedy Festival and Sydney Comedy Festival, Hoo performed her debut show titled Hoo Am I? (What's My Name?). Also in 2019, she became a presenter and contributor for SBS Voices and ABC Life. Hoo has appeared on The Project and The Cook Up with Adam Liaw.

In 2021, she performed her second solo show, Hoo Dis?, at the Oxfam Gala, Melbourne International Comedy Festival and Sydney Comedy Festival. She became a regular guest on Have You Been Paying Attention?.

In 2022, she performed her third comedy show, Hoo Cares!?, at the Melbourne, Brisbane and Sydney Comedy Festivals. Hoo Cares!? was released on Amazon Prime Video on 6 April 2023. Hoo performed at the 2022 OzAsia Festival for The Special Comedy Comedy Special at Her Majesty's Theatre.

In 2023, she performed her show Woo Hoo! at the Melbourne, Brisbane and Sydney Comedy Festivals.

In 2026, she will perform her latest show, Says Hoo?, at the Edinburgh Festival Fringe from 5-30 August.

== Filmography ==
Year	Title	Notes	
2019	Hoo Am I (What's My Name)	Solo show	
2021	The Cook Up with Adam Liaw	Guest	
2021	Hoo Dis?	Solo show	
2022	The Hundred with Andy Lee	Guest	
2022	Have You Been Paying Attention?	Panellist	
2022	Lizzy Hoo – Hoo Dis?	Paramount+ stand up special	
2022	Hoo Cares?	Solo show	
2025	Claire Hooper's House Of Games	Contestant	5 episodes
