= Sashi Perera =

Australian stand-up comedian and writer

- Born: Colombo, Sri Lanka
- Notable work: Endings, Boundaries, Pear Tree

Comedy career
- Medium: Stand Up
- Website: sashiperera.com

Sashi Perera is an Australian stand-up comedian, writer, and former lawyer. Perera has performed at major Australian festivals including the Melbourne International Comedy Festival, Sydney Comedy Festival, and the Adelaide Fringe and internationally, including at the Edinburgh Festival Fringe and the New Zealand Comedy Festival. Perera has also gained a large following on social media.

== Early life and education ==
Perara was born in Columbo, Sri Lanka and raised in Perth, Western Australia. She moved to Melbourne in 2018, for grad school.

== Career ==
Perera first worked as a lawyer, helping refugees and practising human rights law. For a time, she worked for an NGO in Egypt. Perera entered the Melbourne International Comedy Festival’s Raw Comedy competition in 2018 and reached the state finals of the national competition, kickstarting a career in stand-up.

In 2021, she had her own show at the Melbourne International Comedy Festival.

In 2023, she received a Eurydice Dixon grant from the Arts Centre to produce her show, Endings. The solo show explored mortality and change, and was followed by Boundaries in 2024, which continued her exploration of emotional and cultural themes.

In 2024, Perera left the law to become a comedian full-time. In 2025, she released her memoir, Standstill and spent several months living in Sri Lanka.

In 2026, she performed her show Pear Tree at the New Zealand Comedy Festival.

=== Film and television ===
Perera has also appeared on television as a comedian and commentator, including on Have You Been Paying Attention? and Guy Montgomery's Guy Mont-Spelling Bee.

== Critical reception ==
Of her performance at ACMI in April 2026, The Age said: "The refugee lawyer turned rising comedy star has proved her chops elsewhere... but when she opens her mouth to sing, it's unexpectedly moving... No matter the subject, Perera is a master of comic timing... [her] crowd work is always a pleasure to witness, too".

Of her set, the Sydney Morning Herald said "Colonialism has rarely been as funny as with Perera playing tour guide".

The Morning said "It is perhaps this willingness to embrace uncertainty that has made Perera such an engaging performer.... For Sri Lankan audiences, Pear Tree promises something slightly different from the performances seen elsewhere on the tour. The months Perera spent living in Sri Lanka last year have become part of the show itself... That perspective has become one of her defining strengths. Rather than treating identity as something fixed, Perera explores the humour found in its contradictions."

Indian Link said "It’s Perera’s ability to deliver strikingly accurate observations about everyday interactions and the world at large which has led to her content going viral."

== Personal life ==
Perera is married to husband Charlie. Her father's death in December 2021, 6 months after his retirement in April 2021, helped Perera decide to leave the law and become a full-time comedian.
