= Jason Leong =

Malaysian stand up comedian

- Born: 23 January 1985 (age 40); Malaysia
- Occupations: Comedian; Author
- Years active: 2010–present
- Website: Official website

Jason Leong (born 23 January 1985, simplified Chinese: 龙仕强; traditional Chinese: 龍仕強; pinyin: Lóng Shìqiáng) is a Malaysian comedian and author.

== Early life ==
Leong originally studied medicine in University College, Dublin, Ireland. He worked as a doctor in Selayang Hospital, juggling his career as a doctor and a comedian. He eventually gave up his career as a doctor to focus on being a full time stand-up comedian in 2014.

== Career ==
=== Comedy ===
He first found fame as a member of comedy troupe The Malaysian Association of Chinese Comedians, otherwise known as MACC. The troupe consisted of him, Douglas Lim, Phoon Chi Ho and Kuah Jenhan.

In 2013, Leong became the first Malaysian to win the 7th International Hong Kong Comedy Competition.

In 2018, Leong toured his show Harmful When Swallowed in Malaysia, Singapore, India, the Philippines, Hong Kong and Australia.

In 2020, Netflix released Leong's first special on the platform Dr. Jason Leong: Hashtag Blessed on 16 September. The special was originally filmed in 2018, at Temple Of Fine Arts in Brickfields.

In 2022, Leong was selected to perform at the Just for Laughs Comedy Festival in Montreal, Canada. He was one of ten names selected for their New Faces: International showcase, being the only South-East Asian on the lineup that year.

In 2023, Netflix released Leong's second special on the platform Dr. Jason Leong: Ride with Caution on 9 February. The special was filmed in Singapore.

=== Writing ===
In 2007, Leong published his first book The Twisted Stethoscope with Marshall Cavendish.

== Filmography ==
=== Television ===
Year	Programme	Role	Notes
2020	Dr Jason Leong: Hashtag Blessed	Self	Netflix TV Special
2022	Ally Chia Cooks	Ronald	Pre-production
2023	Dr Jason Leong: Ride with Caution	Self	Netflix TV Special
2025	Dr Jason Leong: Warrior in the Garden	Self	YouTube TV Special
