= Geraldine Hickey =

Australian comedian

- Hickey in 2024
- Born: 7 July 1979 (age 47); Albury, New South Wales
- Occupation: Comedian
- Television: Metro Sexual; I'm a Celebrity...Get Me Out of Here!

Geraldine Hickey (born 7 July 1979) is an Australian comedian, known for her work as co-host of the Breakfasters program on Melbourne community radio station 3RRR.

At the 2021 Melbourne International Comedy Festival, Hickey's "What A Surprise" show was awarded the most outstanding show. She had previously been nominated for the same award for "Things Are Going Well" in 2019.

== Career ==
=== Stand Up ===
Hickey's stand up career emerged from her participation in the 2001 RAW Comedy Festival which took her from her hometown of Albury to Melbourne. She competed in the national finals and was runner-up, giving her exposure and a base from which to build a career. 16 years later, Hickey returns to the Raw Comedy finals as co-host. She is a veteran of the Melbourne International Comedy Festival and among her regular stand up appearances has performed at the Melbourne Fringe Festival

=== Radio ===
Hickey got her start in radio hosting 3RRR's all-female sports show The Downlow. Her popularity saw the station appoint her as co-host of the Breakfasters in 2016.

=== Television ===
Hickey has appeared on The Project, Tonightly with Tom Ballard, Have You Been Paying Attention? and Hughesy, We Have a Problem.

In 2019, Hickey starred as Dr Stephanie Huddleston in the eight-part comedy series Metro Sexual on the Nine Network and reprised the role in 2021 for Series 2 on 9GO! and OutTV. In 2025, she appeared as a contestant on the eleventh season of I'm a Celebrity...Get Me Out of Here!. In 2025, she appeared as a contestant on Claire Hooper's House Of Games.
