= Des chiffres et des lettres =

French television program

- Also known as: Numbers and Letters
- Genre: Game show
- Created by: Armand Jammot
- Presented by: Christine Fabréga (1965–1970); Patrice Laffont (1972–1989); Laurent Cabrol (1989–1992); Max Meynier (1992); Laurent Romejko (1992–2024)
- Theme music composer: Eddie Warner
- Country of origin: France
- Original language: French
- No. of seasons: 52
- No. of episodes: 12,000+

Production
- Running time: 33 minutes
- Production company: France Télévisions

Original release
- Network: France 3
- Release: 19 September 1965 – 25 August 2024

Related
- Countdown

Des chiffres et des lettres (French: [de ʃifʁ e de lɛtʁ]; transl. Numbers and Letters) is a French television programme which originally aired from 1965 to 2024. It was created by Armand Jammot and tests the numeracy skills and vocabulary of two contestants. It was one of the longest-running game shows in the world and the inspiration for Countdown on the British Channel 4.

The game debuted in 1965 as Le mot le plus long (transl. The Longest Word), using letters only, and reached its present format in 1972. From 2004 to 2024, it was transmitted on France 3 after 39 years on Antenne 2 and later France 2. It had been hosted since 1992 by Laurent Romejko, who was originally assisted by Arielle Boulin-Prat and Bertrand Renard, the latter two respectively checking words proposed by the contestants and providing solutions to the number problems the contestants failed to solve. Renard was hired on the show at the age of 19, after having won as a contestant in 12 consecutive matches. Starting on 17 September 2022, Boulin-Prat and Renard were replaced by Blandine Maire and Stéphane Crosnier respectively due to disputes over their salaries and the terms of their contracts. The show came to an end on 25 August 2024 after a 58-year run; it aired on weekends during its last two years.

The show was seen throughout the world on TV5Monde including TV5 Québec Canada throughout Canada.

== Rules ==
Two contestants played against one another. As the title of the game indicates, it was based on two skills, numeracy and literacy, and featured three types of challenges:

- Standard letter/number problems, in which both contestants have a chance to score points
- "Duels," speed problems in which only one contestant can score
- A "Final Sprint," consisting of two problems that each award points to only one contestant

The first player to win two games out of three, or to win a single game by 50 points or more, wins the match and takes/retains the championship.

Each show is made up of 16 problems presented in three sections. The first and second sections consist of two letter problems and two numbers problems played alternatively and followed by a duel. The third round consists of two letter problems and two numbers problems played alternatively and followed by the final sprint. If the players are tied at the end of the program a buzzer question is used to break the tie.

Winners can remain on the show for up to 10 consecutive matches.

=== Le compte est bon (Numbers round) ===
Six numbers are chosen at random from a group consisting of the integers 1 through 10 inclusive, 25, 50, 75, and 100. It is possible for the same number to be chosen more than once. A random three-digit target number from 101 to 999 is then generated, and the contestants are given 40 seconds to work out a series of calculations whose final total is equal to that target. They may only use the four basic arithmetic operations of addition, subtraction, multiplication, and division, and do not have to use all six numbers. Only positive integers may be obtained at any step, and no number may be used more times than it appears in the selection.

==== Example ====
Numbers given:

8 4 4 6 8 9

Target number:

594

8 + 8 = 16
16 × 4 = 64
6 − 4 = 2
64 + 2 = 66
66 × 9 = 594

Or

8 × 8 = 64
64 − 4 = 60
60 + 6 = 66
66 × 9 = 594

Contestants signal that they have obtained the target number by saying le compte est bon ("the total is good"), then give the details of their calculations. Ten points are awarded for reaching the target exactly, or for coming as close as possible if an exact solution cannot be reached (as verified by a computer). If neither contestant obtains the best possible solution, the one who comes closest to the target scores seven points. Both contestants score in this case if their results are identical or equally close to the target on either side.

==== Numbo ====
In 1987, Daniel Defays implemented a computer program called "Numbo" which uses probabilistic parallel processing to model human performance in the game Le compte est bon.

=== Le mot le plus long (Letters round) ===
In this round, one contestant is asked how many vowels they would like to be used in a selection of 10 randomly generated letters, each chosen unseen from all possible vowels or consonants. The same letter may appear more than once. The game originally used seven letters, increasing with time to eight and then nine; the 10-letter rule was instituted on 4 April 2010. Contestants previously selected letters by calling for one vowel or consonant at a time.

Once the letters are selected, the contestants are given 30 seconds to form the longest word possible, using each letter no more times than it appears. The contestant who forms the longer valid word scores one point per letter used; if both contestants find the same word or words of equal length, each one scores. Diacritics are not shown on the letters, but may be added as needed: for instance, the French word épeler (to spell) can be formed with the tiles E P E L E R.

==== Example ====
- With the following letters:

T O C E D A M I T S

it is possible to get the French words dictats, amodies and mastoïde.

- With the following letters:

R U R E T E C E R Z

it is possible to get the French words recruter and érecteur.

=== Duels ===
There are several variations of the "duel" section:

- The classic version: given a selection of 10 letters, use each of them once and only once to form two words fitting a common theme
- "L'un dans l'autre" ("one within the other"): with ten given letters, find a ten-letter word and another word, within the first; one a proper noun, the other a common noun
- "La bonne orthographe" ("correct spelling"): be the first to spell a given word correctly
- "Le calcul mental" ("mental arithmetic"): be the first to complete a sequence of calculations in one's head (e.g. (((((889 - 662) + 697) / 7) * 6) / 4); answer = 198)

Only one answer is accepted, from the first player to buzz-in. If the answer is correct, ten points (originally five points) are awarded to the player giving it. If the answer is incorrect, the opponent receives three points.

Before the regular letters and numbers rounds, a toss-up duel is played, with the winner earning a "sesame," or joker, that can be used in the final bonus game (introduced in 2016).

=== Final sprint ===
At the end of the game, the contestants play the "final sprint" where they have to solve two problems. As opposed to the other rounds during the game (except duels), these have been generated prior to the show and they admit at least one perfect solution (either a 10-letter word or a number that can be found with the six given numbers) the contestants must find as fast as possible. As in duels, only one answer is accepted, from the first player to provide one. If the answer is correct, five points are awarded to the player giving it. If the answer is incorrect, the player's opponent receives three points.

Each contestant, starting from the lowest-scored one, chooses which kind of problem they want to play with : numbers or letters.

=== Les mots de la fin ===
This round was introduced in 2016 along with a new set for the show. Only the winning contestant plays this round, and they have two minutes to find the longest word possible in eight different 10-letter selections, receiving €100 per correct answer given. The length of the longest word is given for each selection. The contestant may pass as often as desired, and the selections are cycled until the time expires or all eight have been solved. If the contestant has a joker earned from the opening duel, they may call "sesame" and receive the €100 for the current letter selection. If the contestant solves all eight selections without using the joker, they win an extra €100 for a daily potential maximum of €900.

The maximum possible winnings a contestant can achieve is €9,000 over 10 matches.

== International versions ==
Legend:

Currently airing or returning
No longer airing
Non-broadcast pilot

Country	Title	Main Presenter(s)	Broadcaster(s)	Premiere	Finale
Australia	Letters and Numbers	Richard Morecroft; David Astle; Lily Serna	SBS One	2 August 2010	27 June 2012
Australia	Celebrity Letters and Numbers	Michael Hing; David Astle; Lily Serna	SBS One	2 October 2021	present
Belgium (in Dutch)	Cijfers en Letters	Zaki; Walter De Meyere; Carine Van de Ven	VTM	1989	1993
Burkina Faso	Des mots et des maths	Evariste Toe; Flore Hien; Irène Zoungrana; Lauricia Dakio; Maïmouna Rachel Sawadogo	RTB	2009	present
Denmark	Stav et tal	Sten Ørting; Pia Jarvad	DR	7 January 1991	26 April 1991
Greece	Γράμματα και Αριθμοί; Grámmata kai Arithmoí	Christos Oikonomou	ERT1	13 February 1976	28 December 1981
Greece	Γράμματα και Αριθμοί; Grámmata kai Arithmoí	Kostas Papadonopoulos	Mega Channel	20 November 1989	19 February 1990
Israel	תיק-תק; Tik-Tak	Ronit Kfir; Eyal Kitzis; Efrat Rayten; Sharon Taicher	Israeli Educational Television (Channel 2)	1995	1999
Italy	Paroliamo	Lea Pericoli; Gisella Pagano; Fabrizio Frizzi; Marco Dané	Telemontecarlo (1977–1982); Rai 2 (1982–1989)	1977	1989
Netherlands	Cijfers en Letters	Han van der Meer; Maartje van Weegen; Robert ten Brink; Bob Bouma	KRO	1975	1988
Sweden	Tänk till tusen	Ulf Wickbom	SVT 1	1984	1987
Serbia	ТВ Слагалица; TV Slagalica	Marija Veljković; Kristina Radenković; Milica Gacin	RTS1	22 November 1993	present
South Africa	A Word or 2	Jeremy Mansfield	SABC2	1998	2008
Spain	Cifras y letras	Elisenda Roca (1991–1996); Aitor Albizua (2024–)	La 2 (1991–1996; 2024–)	14 January 1991	present
Spain	Cifras y letras	Paco Lodeiro (2002–2010) (Telemadrid); Goyo González (2010–2012) (Telemadrid); Paco Lodeiro (2006–2013) (TVG); Goyo González (2007–2012) (Canal Sur 2); Paola Bontempi (2008) (Televisión Canaria)	Telemadrid and FORTA	4 January 2002	2013
Spain	Xifres i Lletres	Esther Sastre	La 2 Cataluña	1998	2000
Turkey	Bir Kelime, Bir İşlem	Levent Ülgen; Yeliz Arman; Raşit Yıldırım	TRT 1 TRT Okul	1990	2014
United Kingdom	Countdown	Richard Whiteley (1982–2005); William G. Stewart (1997, edition 2000); Des Lynam (2005–2006); Des O'Connor (2007–2008); Jeff Stelling (2009–2011); Nick Hewer (2012–2021); Anne Robinson (2021–2022); Colin Murray (2022–present)	Channel 4	2 November 1982	present
United States	Countdown	Michael Jackson (1990)	Unknown (pilot)	Not aired	
Yugoslavia	Brojke i slova	Ivan Hetrich; Vedrana Međimorec	JRT; TV Zagreb	1986	1991

=== Australian version ===
An Australian version, called Letters And Numbers (the literal translation of the original), commenced airing on SBS on 2 August 2010. It was hosted by Richard Morecroft. It closely followed the gameplay of the UK version, albeit with a slightly more modern set (with subtly animated background), but the clock, manual letterboards and whiteboard for the maths problems were all present. In the course of the show there were 5 letter rounds, 3 number rounds and a final Conundrum round. The winners of each show carried over to the next episode (up to a maximum of 6 episodes, upon which they must retire), whilst the runner-up went home with a Macquarie dictionary. SBS "retired" the show in June 2012 and replaced it with the British version of the program, Countdown (not to be confused with the Australian music show of the same name).

=== Danish version ===
The Danish version was called Stav et tal (spell a number) and aired on DR.

=== Dutch version ===
Cijfers en Letters was broadcast in the Netherlands by public broadcasting organisation KRO from 1975 until 1988. Hosts were Han van der Meer, Maartje van Weegen, Robert ten Brink and Bob Bouma.

=== Flemish version ===
Cijfers en Letters was broadcast in Flanders on the Flemish commercial television channel VTM from 1989 until 1993. Host of the show was former radio host and DJ Jackie Dewaele, also known as Zaki. Assists were Walter De Meyere and Carine Van de Ven.

=== Greek version ===
The Greek version of the game show, Grámmata kai Arithmoí (Greek: Γράμματα και Αριθμοί), debuted 13 February 1976 on ERT1 with television host Christos Oikonomou. This version was televised until 28 December 1981.

On Monday 20 November 1989, Mega Channel produced a new version of Grámmata kai Arithmoí with television host Kostas Papadonopoulos, but this was cancelled after 19 February 1990 after 15 episodes, as Papandonopoulos' schedule had more-important obligations and the producers were unable to find a replacement host.

=== Italian version ===
Paroliamo is the name of the Italian version of the game, aired by Telemontecarlo and Rai Due for ten seasons.

=== South African version ===
The South African version was called "A Word or 2", and aired on SABC2, from 1998–2008, hosted by Jeremy Mansfield. It followed a similar format to the UK version.

In the letters game, there were three stacks of consonants and vowels. Like in the French version, contestants picked alternately, but the person to begin the round also got to choose which of the three stacks was used for the round.

During the word games, both contestants score regardless of whether it's the winning word or not. During the numbers games, only the closer answer scores.

The winner of each game earned R1000, and returned for another game. The runner-up won a dictionary and the home game. The ultimate winner won a R40,000 laptop, while the runner-up won a R10,000 PC.

=== Spanish version ===
The Spanish TV show Cifras y letras (Numbers and Letters) is another adaptation of Des chiffres et des lettres on TVE 2. Originally presented by Elisenda Roca as of 1991, with a lavishly artistic designed studio and the music for each round being extracted from classical music, a movie soundtrack or similar. There are four rounds consisting of a number game followed by two letter games. Between the second and third round there was a duel that consists of finding two words on the same theme from the nine letters provided.

Points:

- Words are worth one point per letter, but a nine-letter word is worth double; that is, 18 points.
- The correct sum gets 9 points.
- The duel is worth 10 points. Just like the French show, only one answer is accepted, but if the answer is wrong the other player gets 10 points.

The winner would win 100,000 pesetas (€602) and get to play again the next day. If the game was tied, they both would get to play again the next day and each player would win 50,000 pesetas (€301).

The show has returned to La 2 in January 2024, hosted by Aitor Albizua.

=== Swedish version ===
The Swedish version was called Tänk till tusen, and aired on SVT1 from 21 December 1985 until 21 May 1988. It was hosted by Ulf Wickbom.

=== Turkish version ===
Bir Kelime Bir İşlem which means "One word, one operation" is the name of the Turkish version of the game, aired by TRT.

=== Yugoslavian version ===
Brojke i slova is the name of the Yugoslavian version of the game, produced by the TV center Zagreb for airing on the common Yugoslavian network JRT. The show used the Serbo-Croatian language and ran throughout the 1980s.

=== UK version ===
The first UK version of the series was broadcast on Yorkshire Television who commissioned a series of eight shows under the title Calendar Countdown which was to be a spin-off of their regional news programme Calendar. As the presenter of Calendar, Richard Whiteley was the natural choice to present. These shows were only broadcast in the Yorkshire area. The current long-running United Kingdom series Countdown began in 1982 on Channel 4 but still made by Yorkshire Television. It is a close adaptation of the same format, the main differences are that the rounds last only 30 seconds instead of 45, only one contestant chooses the letters or numbers in each round and the "duels" are replaced with the "Countdown Conundrum", a nine-letter anagram.

The style of presentation is notably (and deliberately) more old-fashioned and uses no computerised elements whatsoever, other than a random number generator for the numbers round. Whereas contestants on Des chiffres et des lettres use computer touchscreens to register their words / number solutions, Countdown contestants use pen and paper. Unlike Des chiffres et des lettres' computerised displays, Countdown's letters and numbers are displayed as tiles physically placed on a board, with the time limit being measured using a huge analogue clock that stands behind the contestants, as opposed to a bar gradually filling in. The clock and the music played during the rounds, have become icons of the UK show.

No major prizes are offered; winners receive a teapot styled to resemble the clock and defeated contestants and retiring champions receive an assortment of show-themed merchandise. The top players during each series are invited back at its end to compete against each other for prizes that have included, at different times, a full leather-bound set of the Oxford English Dictionary, book tokens, and laptop computers. The low-tech and low-budget nature of the production is a subject of numerous jokes within the programme.

=== U.S. version ===
An unsold pilot for a U.S. version titled Countdown was filmed on 18 September 1990 hosted by Los Angeles Radio personality Michael Jackson, announced by Charlie O'Donnell, and produced by the Guber-Peters Company (successor to Barris Industries now owned by Sony Pictures Television). In 2023, the full pilot was posted on Wink Martindale's YouTube page as part of his ongoing Wink's Vault series.

==== Main game ====
Two teams, each with one celebrity (Heather Thomas & Woody Harrelson) competed in a series of rounds involving forming words from a series of nine letters.

Letter tiles are arranged face-down into two piles; one all consonants, the other vowels. The contestant picks a pile, and Jackson reveals the top tile from that pile and places it on the board. A selection of nine tiles is generated in this way, and must contain at least three vowels and four consonants. Then, the clock is started and both contestants have 30 seconds to come up with the longest word they can make from the available letters. Each letter may be used only as often as it appears in the selection.

Both team members write down the words they have found during the round, in case they have the same one. The players may confer, but each player comes up with an individual word and shows them Match Game style at the end of the 30 seconds. After the 30 seconds are up, the players declare the length of their chosen word, with the player who selected the letters declaring first. If either player has not written their word down in time, he/she must declare this also. The words are then revealed. If either player has not written their word down, that is revealed first; otherwise, the shorter word is shown first. The teams score one point for each letter in both words, up to a maximum of 18. If a contestant offers an invalid word then they score no points. If the second player reveals the same word as the first, this must be proved by showing the word to the other contestant. Finally, two word authorities (Tony Pandolfo, Lori Huggins) reveal the best word they could find from the selection, aided by the production team.

Should a team find a 9-letter word, they instantly win $25,000.

The team with the most points after three rounds wins the game and goes on to the bonus round.

==== Bonus round ====
The team has 45 seconds to solve seven scrambled words (four, five, six, seven, seven, eight and nine letters long). All words had something in common, like "At the Movies". The celebrity was allowed to assist. Getting each word was worth $200 and all seven words were worth $10,000.

As in the 80s versions of Pyramid, two games are played with the contestants switching celebrities for game two. The player with the most money from the bonus round returned the next day. If there was a tie, both players returned the next day.
