= Bertrand Renard =

French television presenter and author (born 1955)

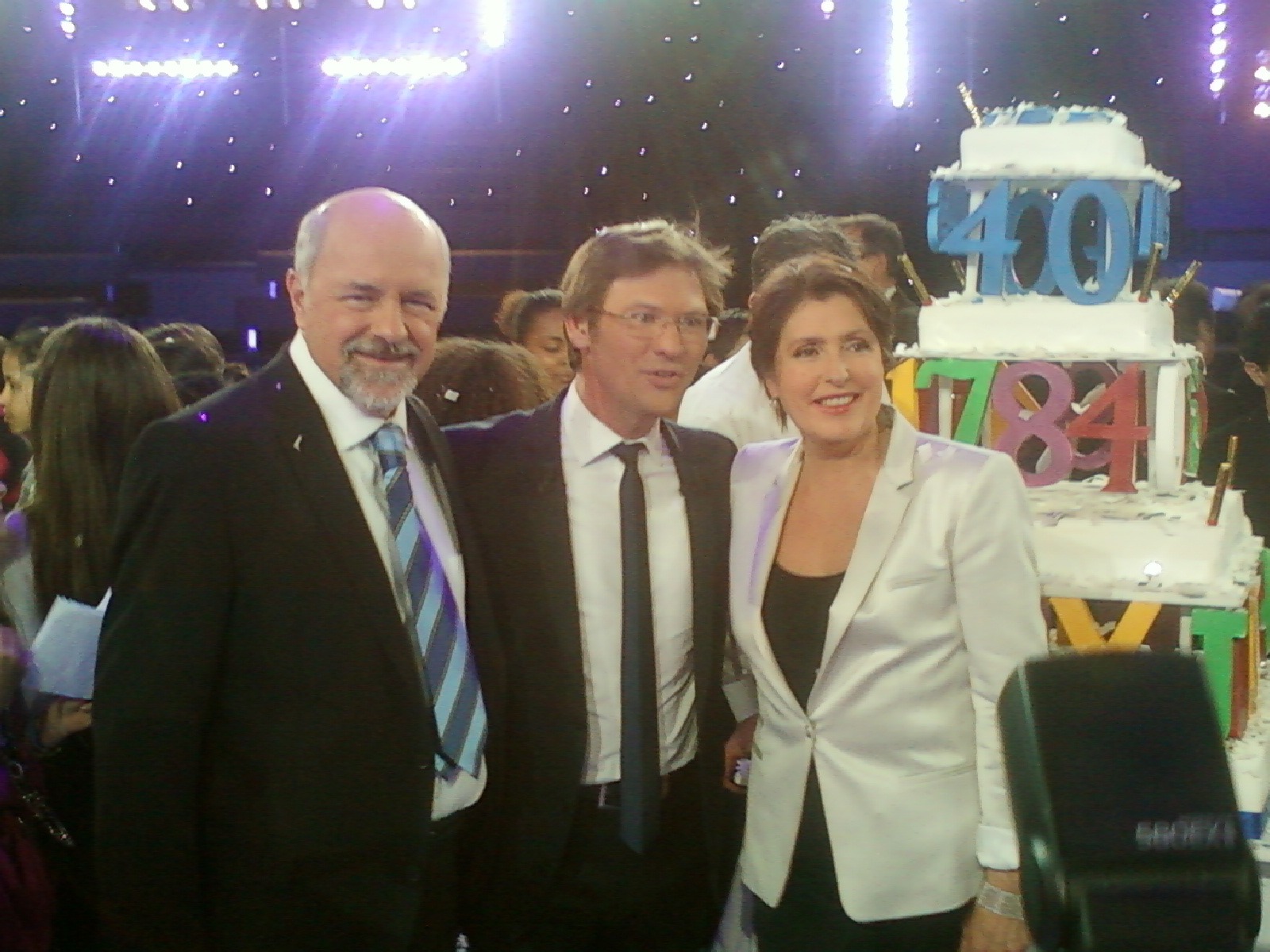
- Bertrand Renard, Laurent Romejko and Arielle Boulin-Prat in 2012
- Born: 28 April 1955 (age 71); Paris, France
- Occupations: Television presenter, author
- Years active: 1974–present
- Television: Des chiffres et des lettres (France 2)

Bertrand Renard (born 28 April 1955) is a French television presenter and author. He is a former presenter of the game show Des chiffres et des lettres, on which he had previously appeared as a contestant.

== Early life ==
Bertrand Renard was born in Paris. He studied classics (French / Latin / Greek) at the Sorbonne, He passed one Agrégation de Lettres Classiques but failed overall. Interested in television, he did not retake the exam. He was a good student, but acknowledged his lack of interest. He is a passionate student of history and was described as having hyperthymesia, memorizing without any effort. He stated that he was "absolutely not interested in mathematics and science".

== Career ==
=== Des chiffres et des lettres ===
In September 1974, Renard participated at age 19 on the game show Des chiffres et des lettres. He was noticed for his facility with mental calculation and by his shy attitude, hiding behind long hair and a thin moustache which he kept, as well as his anxious attitude, continuously moving on his chair. After twelve victories in a row, he earned 6,000 francs (equivalent to €5,548 in today's money).

In March 1975, the producer, Armand Jammot, hired him to join the team as a presenter, replacing Fabien Buhler. He was known as "Monsieur Calcul". Renard explained his hiring by noting that "the show was hosted at the time by Patrice Laffont, who was 35. 'Monsieur Dictionnaire' was Max Favalelli, who was much older, 70. And I was the youngest, so it created a sort of balance".

They put him in charge of verifying game results with numbers and calculations, titled "Le Compte est bon". Renard took charge in 1975 with Favalelli of the part with letters and words titled "Le Mot le plus long", and then with Arielle Boulin-Prat in 1986, replacing Favalelli. The other presenters were Patrice Laffont first, and since 1992, Laurent Romejko.

For more than 39 years, he daily officiated without interruption on the show. He has never taken a vacation, afraid that he would be replaced. He is the oldest presenter, appearing on the oldest program on French television. Michel Drucker started earlier, but appeared less often because he appeared daily.

In September 2022, Renard and fellow co-presenter Arielle Boulin-Prat were dismissed from the show due to a dispute over their salaries and the terms of their contracts. They were respectively replaced by Stéphane Crosnier and Blandine Maire.

=== Other programs ===
Renard wrote a collection of stories and two novels. One obtained a prize from the Société des gens de lettres. He also wrote a newspaper column. In 1987, he was one of the members of the program L'Assiette anglaise presented by Bernard Rapp, with Christine Bravo and Jean Teulé, as a literature columnist. In 1991, he participated in the program My télé is rich. He also participated in Télématin and Jamais sans mon livre in 1993.

== Publications ==
=== Novels and stories ===
- 1982 : Sarlat et le Périgord noir, librairie Favalelli, 125 pages.
- 1986 : Voyelle, consonne (with Patrice Laffont), éditions France Loisirs, 175 pages.
- 1991 : Le Gardien du clocher, Bourin Éditeur, 272 pages.
- 1994 : Les Étangs, éditions Julliard, 848 pages.
- 1996 : Le Double Secret, éditions Flammarion, 482 pages.

=== Collections of word games ===
- 2012 : Bertrand Renard présente, Le plaisir des mots croisés, fléchés et cachés, 330 jeux et leur solutions, éditions l'Archipel.
- 2013 : Bertrand Renard présente, Le plaisir des mots croisés, fléchés et cachés, 330 jeux et leur solutions, éditions l'Archipel.
