= Richard Morecroft =

Australian media presenter and conservationist (1956–2026)

- Morecroft in 1986
- Born: 20 January 1956; Market Harborough, Leicestershire, England
- Died: 6 October 2026 (aged 70); New South Wales, Australia
- Occupations: Radio announcer; television newsreader; host
- Years active: 1981–2026
- Known for: Host of Behind the News; ABC News NSW bulletin; Letters and Numbers

Richard Morecroft (20 January 1956 – 6 October 2026) was an Australian radio announcer, television newsreader and presenter, and conservationist. He presented the ABC News SA bulletin, before becoming the long-running host of the nightly bulletin of ABC News NSW from 1983 until 2002. Between 2010 and 2012, he hosted the quiz show Letters and Numbers.

== Life and career ==
Morecroft was born on 20 January 1956 in Market Harborough in the English Midlands. His father Peter, a dentist, and mother Phyll moved the family to Adelaide in 1966 for the benefit of his brother Andrew's respiratory problems.

Morecroft introducing an ABC news report on Lindy Chamberlain in 1986

Morecroft studied English and Drama at the University of Adelaide with thoughts of becoming an actor or teacher. He became involved in the university radio station and auditioned for the ABC before completing his degree. He was hired as a radio announcer and later transferred to work in television, hosting the 7 pm Adelaide bulletin for a couple of years before being approached to replace James Dibble who had presented the bulletin since it began in 1956.

He moved to Sydney in 1982 and took over the ABC News NSW bulletin in July 1983, as well as presenting Behind the News. In 1985, he and Geraldine Doogue co-hosted The National, the ABC's short-lived experiment with an hour-long nightly news service, combining news and current affairs, with Max Walsh and Richard Carleton as chief reporters. Also during his time with the ABC, Morecroft participated with the ABC's Natural History Unit in the production of Raising Archie, about a flying fox which he raised and used to keep under the news desk while at work. Morecroft presented the ABC News NSW bulletin until 2002, and also hosted election-night broadcasts and educational programs. He would always sign off by saying "And that's the news to this minute."

Morecroft became such a widely recognizable Australian newscaster that he appeared as the newscaster in many Australian movies and television shows during and after his career, including: Police Rescue (1991–1996), The Roly Poly Man (1993), Wildside (1997–1998) and Red Hill (2010).

He left the ABC in 2002, being replaced by Tony Eastley, and underwent a sea change, moving to a property near Jervis Bay with his partner, artist Alison Mackay. He said he was not retiring, but wanted to work in a different way.

Morecroft returned to the ABC to host Richard Morecroft Goes Wild in 2002, drawing on his passion for environmental issues.

In 2010, it was announced that he would host Letters and Numbers on SBS Television, an Australian version of the French game show Des chiffres et des lettres, on which the British game show Countdown is based. The first program aired on 2 August 2010. Morecroft was joined by crossword compiler David Astle and mathematician Lily Serna.

He was diagnosed with cancer in early 2026, and died on the South Coast of New South Wales on 6 October 2026, at the age of 70, using voluntary assisted dying.

== Environmental activities ==
Morecroft was a governor of the Taronga Foundation and a director of the Zoological Parks Board of New South Wales. He was a trustee of the World Wide Fund for Nature and a patron of WIRES.

== Publications ==
His book 20 Years from the Waist Up was published in 2002.

Media offices
Preceded by James Dibble	ABC News NSW presenter 1983–2002	Succeeded by Tony Eastley
