= Celebrity Letters and Numbers =

Australian comedy panel game show

- Genre: Comedy panel game
- Based on: Des chiffres et des lettres by Armand Jammot
- Presented by: Michael Hing
- Starring: David Astle; Lily Serna
- Country of origin: Australia
- Original language: English
- No. of series: 4
- No. of episodes: 48

Production
- Camera setup: Multi-camera
- Running time: 50 minutes
- Production company: ITV Studios Australia

Original release
- Network: SBS
- Release: 2 October 2021 – present

Celebrity Letters and Numbers is an Australian comedy panel game show on SBS which premiered on 2 October 2021. It is a revived version of the game show Letters and Numbers, which aired on SBS from 2010 to 2012, with an altered format with celebrity contestants competing rather than members of the public. Co-hosts David Astle and Lily Serna returned from the original series, while comedian, journalist and actor Michael Hing replaced presenter Richard Morecroft as host.

Two series of twelve episodes were commissioned in July 2021 with celebrity guests including Hamish Blake, Susie Youssef, Merrick Watts and Matt Okine. Series three premiered on 17 September 2022, with series four set to air on 5 February 2024. As of February 2024, new episodes of Celebrity Letters & Numbers have been pulled from SBS, after just two episodes. The last 10 episodes in series 4, which broadcast on SBS Viceland at 6.00pm Weeknights starting from 9 September 2024 until 20 September 2024.

The show is similar to the British comedy panel show 8 Out of 10 Cats Does Countdown, which also features celebrity comedians and airs on SBS in Australia. ITV Studios Australia also took over as the production company (Shine Australia had produced the civilian version); the revamped program uses ITV-owned elements developed for the British Countdown such as its logo style and theme music.

== Gameplay ==
Unlike the original version of Letters and Numbers, each episode features three contestants competing individually and the winning contestant does not return for the next episode. Additionally, instead of winning a Macquarie Dictionary, the guest with the most points wins a single volume from the 1980s Oceaniapaedia encyclopedia, allegedly donated by the Hing family (in later series, winner gets an item from Hing's childhood bedroom, e.g. a set of goth rings). Another addition is the inclusion of a Dictionary Corner guest, as in the British show Countdown, who sits beside Astle. The mix of letters and numbers rounds, the final nine-letter conundrum and the eight-letter word mixes preceding the commercial break are retained from the original series.

Scoring also differs slightly from the original Letters and Numbers. All contestants whose answers are valid win points, regardless of whether another contestant declared a longer word (in the letters game) or achieved a closer numerical target (in the numbers game). Spelling variations, such as American spellings, are also valid in Celebrity Letters and Numbers.

== Episodes ==
Series	Episodes	Originally released	
Series	Episodes	First released	Last released
1	12	2 October 2021	18 December 2021
2	12	5 March 2022	21 May 2022
3	12	3 October 2022	26 December 2022
4	12	5 February 2024	20 September 2024

=== Series 1 (2021) ===
Note: Winners are listed in bold

No.	Title	Original release date	Australian viewers
1	Episode 1	2 October 2021	209,000
Contestants: **Suren Jayemanne**, Jennifer Wong, Merrick Watts; Dictionary Corner guest: Bridie Connell
2	Episode 2	9 October 2021	174,000
Contestants: **Aaron Chen**, Alex Lee, Matt Okine; Dictionary Corner guest: Carlo Ritchie
3	Episode 3	16 October 2021	137,000
Contestants: Susie Youssef, Dane Simpson, **Hamish Blake**; Dictionary Corner guest: Adam Richard
4	Episode 4	23 October 2021	132,000
Contestants: Nikki Britton, Oliver Twist, **Merrick Watts**; Dictionary Corner guest: Adam Richard
5	Episode 5	30 October 2021	124,000
Contestants: **Dane Simpson**, Tanya Hennessy, Todd McKenney; Dictionary Corner guest: Carlo Ritchie
6	Episode 6	6 November 2021	98,000
Contestants: Akmal Saleh, **Mark Humphries**, Greta Lee Jackson; Dictionary Corner guest: Carlo Ritchie
7	Episode 7	13 November 2021	108,000
Contestants: **Jennifer Wong**, Nakkiah Lui, Merrick Watts; Dictionary Corner guest: Adam Richard
8	Episode 8	20 November 2021	100,000
Contestants: Lewis Hobba, Concetta Caristo, **Susie Youssef**; Dictionary Corner guest: Carlo Ritchie
9	Episode 9	27 November 2021	N/A
Contestants: Alex Lee, **Adam Richard**, Nikki Britton; Dictionary Corner guest: Carlo Ritchie
10	Episode 10	4 December 2021	N/A
Contestants: Susie Youssef, Nina Oyama, **Mark Humphries**; Dictionary Corner guest: Gabbi Bolt
11	Episode 11	11 December 2021	N/A
Contestants: **Matt Okine**, Jennifer Wong, Todd McKenney; Dictionary Corner guest: Carlo Ritchie
12	Episode 12	18 December 2021	N/A
Contestants: Bob Downe, **Nikki Britton**, Susie Youssef; Dictionary Corner guest: Carlo Ritchie

=== Series 2 (Early 2022) ===
Note: Winners are listed in bold

No.	Title	Original release date	Australian viewers
1	Episode 13	5 March 2022	N/A
Contestants: Aaron Chen, **Susie Youssef**, Merrick Watts; Dictionary Corner guest: Carlo Ritchie
2	Episode 14	12 March 2022	N/A
Contestants: Benjamin Law, Concetta Caristo, **Bob Downe**; Dictionary Corner guest: Carlo Ritchie
3	Episode 15	19 March 2022	N/A
Contestants: **Alex Lee**, Dane Simpson, Nakkiah Lui; Dictionary Corner guest: Adam Richard
4	Episode 16	26 March 2022	N/A
Contestants: Mike Goldstein, **Merrick Watts**, Sacha Horler; Dictionary Corner guest: Tom Cashman
5	Episode 17	2 April 2022	N/A
Contestants: **Aaron Chen**, Todd McKenney, Nakkiah Lui; Dictionary Corner guest: Carlo Ritchie
6	Episode 18	9 April 2022	N/A
Contestants: Tanya Hennessy, Benjamin Law, **Merrick Watts**; Dictionary Corner guest: Nakkiah Lui
7	Episode 19	16 April 2022	N/A
Contestants: Susie Youssef, Dane Simpson, **Adam Richard**; Dictionary Corner guest: Jennifer Wong
8	Episode 20	23 April 2022	N/A
Contestants: Akmal Saleh, **Sacha Horler**, Tanya Hennessy; Dictionary Corner guest: Carlo Ritchie
9	Episode 21	30 April 2022	N/A
Contestants: Adam Richard, **Merrick Watts**, Nakkiah Lui; Dictionary Corner guest: Carlo Ritchie
10	Episode 22	7 May 2022	N/A
Contestants: Nina Oyama, Dane Simpson, **Concetta Caristo**; Dictionary Corner guest: Carlo Ritchie
11	Episode 23	14 May 2022	N/A
Contestants: Colin Fassnidge, **Nikki Britton**, Concetta Caristo; Dictionary Corner guest: Carlo Ritchie
12	Episode 24	21 May 2022	N/A
Contestants: Aaron Chen, Tanya Hennessy, **Mark Humphries**; Dictionary Corner guest: Carlo Ritchie

=== Series 3 (Late 2022) ===
Note: Winners are listed in bold

No.	Title	Original release date	Australian viewers
1	Episode 25	3 October 2022	N/A
Contestants: **Dave Thornton**, Alex Lee, Luke McGregor; Dictionary Corner guest: Alasdair Tremblay-Birchall
2	Episode 26	10 October 2022	N/A
Contestants: **Mark Humphries**, Jenny Tian, Matt Okine; Dictionary Corner guest: Cal Wilson
3	Episode 27	17 October 2022	N/A
Contestants: Gen Fricker, **Harley Breen**, **Concetta Caristo**; Dictionary Corner guest: Andy Saunders
4	Episode 28	24 October 2022	N/A
Contestants: Ben Lee, Alex Lee, **Hamish Blake**; Dictionary Corner guest: Carlo Ritchie
5	Episode 29	31 October 2022	N/A
Contestants: Jenny Tian, Rhys Nicholson, **Michala Banas**; Dictionary Corner guest: Carlo Ritchie
6	Episode 30	7 November 2022	N/A
Contestants: Oliver Twist, Concetta Caristo, Nath Valvo; Dictionary Corner guest: Carlo Ritchie
7	Episode 31	14 November 2022	N/A
Contestants: Anthony 'Lehmo' Lehmann, Alex Lee, Reuben Kaye; Dictionary Corner guest: Claire Hooper
8	Episode 32	21 November 2022	N/A
Contestants: Alex Ward, Dylan Lewis, Mel Buttle; Dictionary Corner guest: Alasdair Tremblay-Birchall
9	Episode 33	28 November 2022	N/A
Contestants: Sam Taunton, Jennifer Wong, Mark Humphries; Dictionary Corner guest: Karl Kruszelnicki
10	Episode 34	5 December 2022	N/A
Contestants: Reuben Kaye, Zoë Coombs Marr, Oliver Twist; Dictionary Corner guest: Bridie Connell
11	Episode 35	19 December 2022	N/A
Contestants: Nikki Britton, Joel Creasey and Urvi Majumdar; Dictionary Corner guest: Tom Cashman
12	Episode 36	26 December 2022	N/A
Contestants: Merrick Watts, Mel Buttle, David Woodhead; Dictionary Corner guest: Tom Cashman

=== Series 4 (2024) ===
Note: Winners are listed in bold
Note: Episode 3 in this series is dedicated to Cal Wilson.

No.	Title	Original release date	Australian viewers
1	Episode 37	5 February 2024	N/A
Contestants: Merrick Watts, Jenny Tian, Dylan Lewis; Dictionary Corner guest: Matt Stewart
2	Episode 38	12 February 2024	N/A
Contestants: Harley Breen, Lizzy Hoo, AJ Lamarque; Dictionary Corner guest: Jude Perl
3	Episode 39	9 September 2024	N/A
Contestants: Sami Shah, Chris Ryan, Suren Jayemanne; Dictionary Corner guest: Cal Wilson
4	Episode 40	10 September 2024	N/A
Contestants: Suren Jayemanne, Vic Zerbst, Anthony 'Lehmo' Lehmann, Dictionary Corner guest: Claire Hooper
5	Episode 41	11 September 2024	N/A
Contestants: Mark Humphries, Nath Valvo, Demi Lardner; Dictionary Corner guest: Danielle Walker
6	Episode 42	12 September 2024	N/A
Contestants: Nikki Britton, Michala Banas, Suren Jayemanne; Dictionary Corner guest: Karl Kruszelnicki
7	Episode 43	13 September 2024	N/A
Contestants: Dave Thornton, Alex Lee, Sami Shah; Dictionary Corner guest: Bridie Connell
8	Episode 44	16 September 2024	N/A
Contestants: Harley Breen, Oliver Twist, Angie Kent; Dictionary Corner guest: Kristy Webeck
9	Episode 45	17 September 2024	N/A
Contestants: Nath Valvo, Jennifer Wong, Ivan Aristguieta; Dictionary Corner guest: Daniel Burt
10	Episode 46	18 September 2024	N/A
Contestants: Zoë Coombs Marr, Suren Jayemanne, Rhys Nicholson; Dictionary Corner guest: Daniel Burt
11	Episode 47	19 September 2024	N/A
Contestants: Geraldine Hickey, Merrick Watts, Lizzy Hoo; Dictionary Corner guest: Carlo Ritchie
12	Episode 48	20 September 2024	N/A
Contestants: Luke McGregor, Concetta Caristo and Jenna Owen; Dictionary Corner guest: Andy Saunders

== See also ==
- 8 Out of 10 Cats Does Countdown
- Letters and Numbers
- Countdown
