= The Carleton-Walsh Report =

Australian news and current affairs television show (1985-87)

The Carleton-Walsh Report is an Australian news and current affairs program broadcast by the ABC from 1985. It was fronted by Richard Carleton and Max Walsh. It was a half hour long show shown on Tuesday to Thursday. Originally designed as a companion to The National it outperformed them despite timeslot issues. In 1987 it moved from a 9:30pm slot to 10:00pm. Carleton left the show in later that year and it became The Walsh Report in July 1987. The show finished on 30 November 1987.
