= Bernard Hugo =

French politician (1930–2021)

Senator from Yvelines
- In office 1977–1986

Mayor of Trappes
- In office 1966–1996

General Councillor of the Canton of Trappes
- In office 1973–1979

Personal details
- Born: 4 October 1930 Crosne, France
- Died: 19 March 2021 (aged 90) Guyancourt, France
- Party: PCF

Bernard Hugo (4 October 1930 – 19 March 2021) was a French politician. A member of the French Communist Party, he served as a Senator from Yvelines, Mayor of Trappes, and General Councillor of the Canton of Trappes.

== Biography ==
Bernard Hugo was born on October 4, 1930, in Crosne, into a working-class family. After graduating from the École normale d'instituteurs de Versailles, Yvelines (Versailles Teacher Training College), he was appointed to Houdan in 1951, Versailles in 1953, and then Trappes in 1954. There he created the municipal secular youth center, becoming its secretary general shortly thereafter. In 1956, he obtained his teaching certificate for general education middle schools and taught in middle schools from 1956 to 1965, then in 1964 obtained his certificate to teach children with special needs.

A member of the Union of Republican Youth of France (UJRF) in 1947, he joined the French Communist Party the following year.

An activist, he became involved in the 1950s with the association Vacances populaires éducatives (Educational Holidays for the Poor), linked to Secours Populaire Français, and with the association Insertion, Éducation et Soins (Integration, Education, and Care), which managed facilities for young people with disabilities.

A member of the National Council of the Mouvement de la Paix, among other organizations, he was one of the vice presidents of the Franco-Korean Friendship Association.

Bernard Hugo died on March 19, 2021.
