= Axelle Laffont =

French actress and comedian

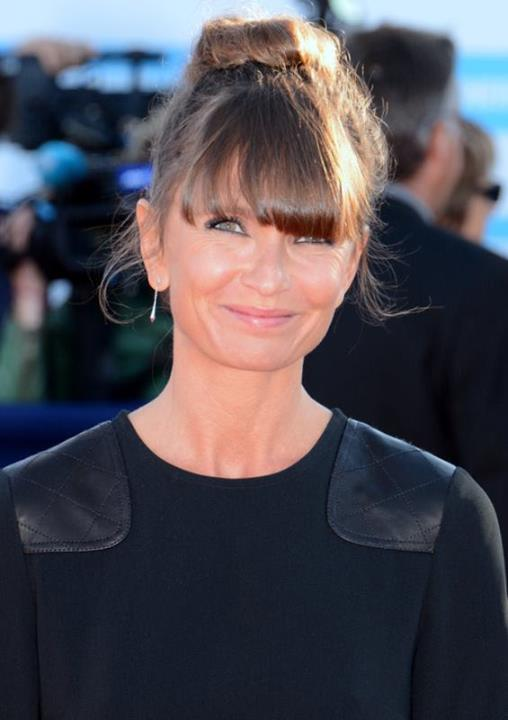
- Axelle Laffont at the 2013 Deauville American Film Festival.
- Born: 24 July 1970 (age 55); Marseille (Bouches-du-Rhône), France
- Occupations: Actress, comedian

Axelle Laffont (born 24 July 1970) is a French actress and comedian.

She was born in Marseille. She is both the granddaughter of publisher Robert Laffont, and the daughter of Patrice Laffont, television presenter, and Catherine Laporte. She is also the stepdaughter of Édouard Molinaro who married her mother in 1982.

== Career ==
Axelle Laffont participated in La Matinale d'Arthur from 1996 to 1999, but became known by intervening in La Grosse Émission from 1999 to 2000 and then presenting in 2000 and 2001 a very special weather and staggered in the show Nulle part ailleurs on Canal+, based on sketches and burlesque disguises.

She also appeared in series such as Un gars, une fille, Caméra Café, H (Season 1 Episode 12: A Red Flacon) and Kaamelott (Book 3 Episode 5: Sefriane of Aquitaine).

She makes a one-woman show La Folie du spectacle on a production by Serge Hazanavicius and Maurice Barthelemy of Robins des bois from 2002 to 2005.

In 2007, she co-wrote and co-produced Mariage surprise.

From September 2007 to January 2008, she regularly appeared in the program On n'est pas couché hosted by Laurent Ruquier on Saturday nights on France 2.

In 2009, she wrote the comic, Marny. In February 2010, she released her first album Axelle Laffont in translation, which incorporates American standards translated into French.

She also appeared on France Inter's Le Fou du roi. In 2012, she plays Smoke this cigarette at the Théâtre des Mathurins. In September 2015, she returned on stage with the one woman show HyperSensible, directed by Charles Templon.

== Filmography ==
=== Films ===
Year	Title	Director	Notes
1996	Beaumarchais	Édouard Molinaro	
1998	The Perfect Guy		
1999	Les Petits Souliers		
2002	The Race		
2002	3 zéros		
2003	Une affaire qui roule		
2003	Pôv'fille		
2005	Le Manie-tout		
2005	Cavalcade		
2005	40 milligrammes d'amour par jour	Charles Meurisse	Short film
2007	Je déteste les enfants des autres	Anne Fassio	
2007	Un château en Espagne		
2012	Paulette		
2017	Daddy Cool	Maxime Govare	
2018	MILF	Elise	

=== Television ===
Year	Title	Role	Notes
1997	Navarro	Isabelle Chevalie	Season 9 Episode 1 "Une Femme À L'Index"
1998	H	Sabri's girlfriend	Season 1 Episode 1
1999	H	Journalist	Season 1 Episode 12
2005	Kaamelott	Séfriane, niece of the Duke of Aquitaine	Book III, Episode 5
2007	Mariage surprise		Directed by Arnaud Sélignac. She co-wrote the screenplay with Arnaud Lemort and Serge Hazanavicius.
2011	Illegal Love		Directed by Julie Gali (voice)
2012	Profilage	Big Sister, role of Caroline Despond	Season 3 Episode 5
2015	A Very Secret Service		Directed by Alexandre Courtès
2016	Nina	Christiana	Season 2 Episode 7
2016	Le Grand Journal		Columnist

== Theatre ==
Run	Title	Creators	Directors	Location
2005	La Folie du Spectacle		Serge Hazanavicius, Maurice Barthélemy	
2011	Fume cette cigarette	Emmanuel Robert-Espalieu, Vincent Desagnat	Édouard Molinaro	Théâtre des Mathurins
2015	Un cadeau hors du temps	Luciano Nottino	Gérard Gélas	Théâtre du Chêne noir
2015–16	Hypersensible			Théâtre du Petit-Saint-Martin

== Private life ==
She was in a relationship with French actor Serge Hazanavicius, until September 2009 and they have a daughter, Mitty Hazanavicius, born on 4 January 2006.

From 2013 to 2015, she was in a relationship with Cyril Paglino, a former contestant on the reality TV show Secret Story.

Since February 2021, she has been living with Romain Sichez.
