= Hôtel de Ville, Trappes =

Town hall in Trappes, France

Hôtel de Ville
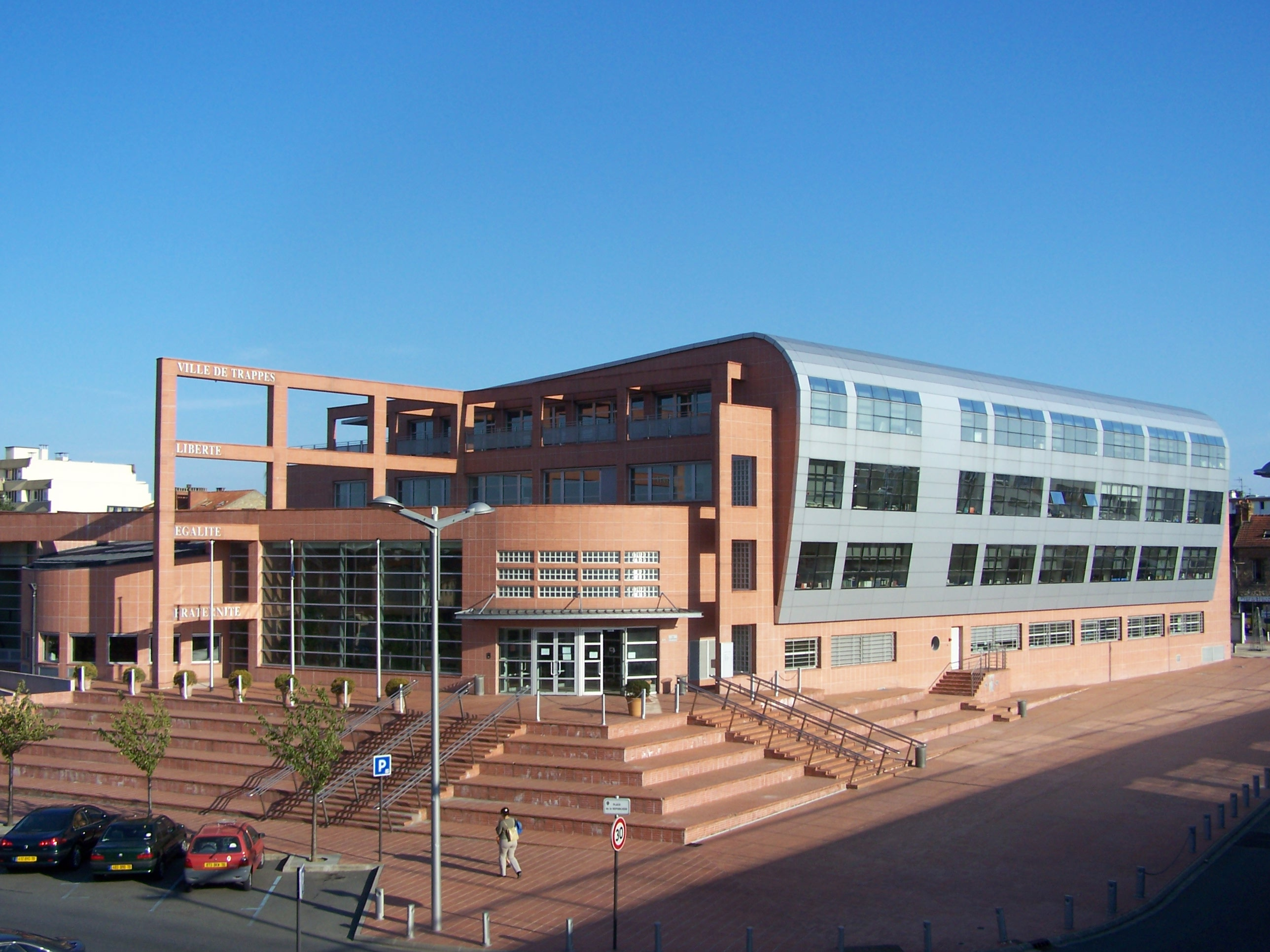
- The main frontage of the Hôtel de Ville in September 2006
- Interactive map of the Hôtel de Ville area

General information
- Type: City hall
- Architectural style: Modern style
- Location: Trappes, France
- Coordinates: 48.7760°N 1.9993°E
- Completed: 2000

Design and construction
- Architects: Didier Brard and Alessandro Ménasé

The Hôtel de Ville (French pronunciation: [otɛl də vil], City Hall) is a municipal building in Trappes, Yvelines, in the western suburbs of Paris, standing on Rue de la République.

== History ==
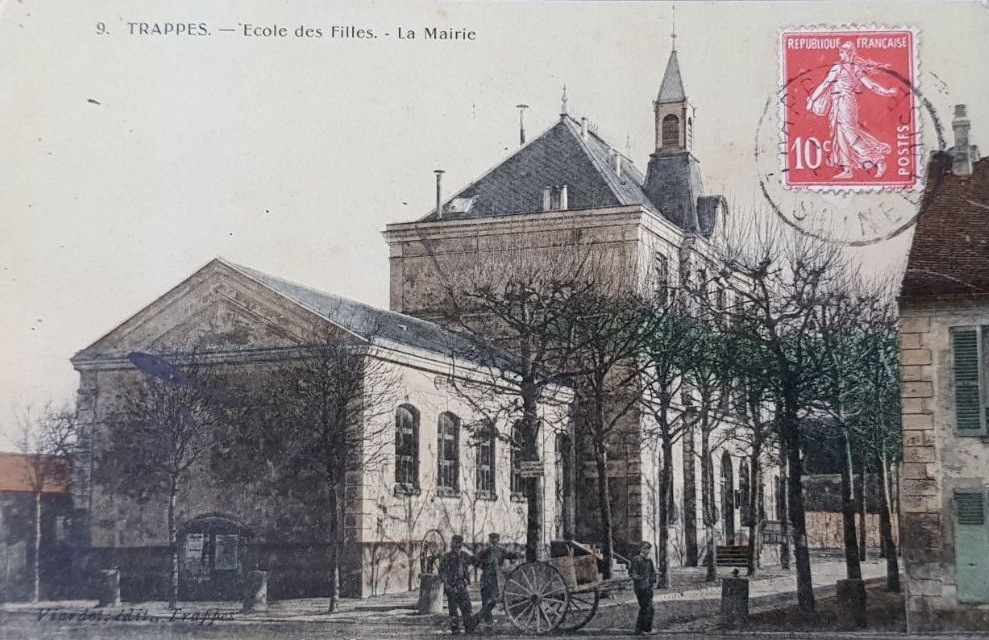
The old town hall

Following the French Revolution, the town council initially met in the house of the mayor at that time. After the opening of the Paris–Brest railway in 1865, the town experienced significant population growth and, in the early 1880s, the council led by the mayor, Vital Caumont, decided to commission a combined town hall and school. The site they selected was on the east side of what is now Avenue Carnot. The new building was designed in the neoclassical style, built in ashlar stone and was completed in 1884.

The design involved a symmetrical main frontage of five bays facing onto the street. The central section of three bays, which was slightly projected forward, featured a short flight of steps leading up to a round headed doorway which was flanked by two round headed windows. The outer bays and the bays on the upper floors were fenestrated by round headed windows. There was a clock above the central bay and a square belfry behind the clock. The building was exclusively used for municipal purposes after new schools, such as the École Paul Langevin, opened in the 1950s.

In the mid-1990s, following further population growth, the council led by the mayor, Bernard Hugo, decided to commission a modern town hall. The site they selected was 300 meters (980 ft) southwest of the old town hall. Construction of the new building started in December 1998. It was designed in the modern style, built in red brick with grey cladding at a cost of €57 million and was officially opened in October 2000.

The design involved a flight of steps leading up to a double-height curved entrance block at the northwest corner of the building. The western elevation featured a long section which was slightly projected forward and clad with grey aluminium tiles which curved over onto the roof and accommodated the public services gallery. Meanwhile, the northern frontage featured a double height semi-circular section which accommodated the Salle du Conseil (council chamber). A bronze statue of the politician, Jean Jaurès, created by the sculptor, Jean Charles Mainardis, was erected at the southern end of the town hall in November 2014.
