= Laurent Romejko =

French television host

- Laurent Francis Gabriel Romejko
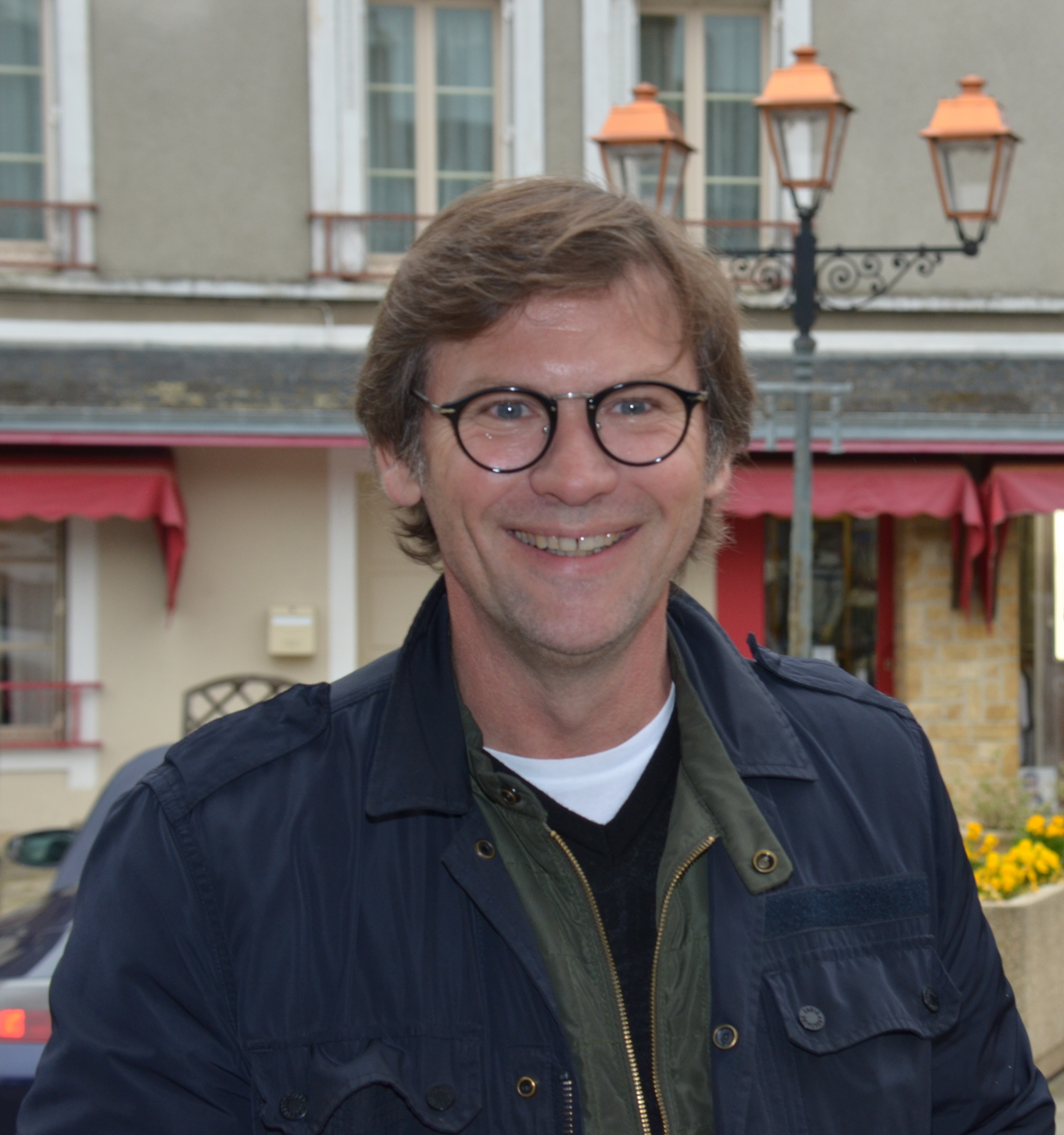
- Romejko in 2017
- Born: December 27, 1963 (age 62); Meulan, Yvelines, France
- Education: École supérieure de journalisme de Paris
- Occupations: Television host, journalist
- Years active: 1982–present
- Employer(s): Antenne 2 / France 2 / France 3, RFM, Canal J, Paris Première
- Known for: Hosting Des chiffres et des lettres (1992–2024), Météo à la carte (2012–present)
- Partner: Sylvie Bazyn
- Children: 3

Laurent Francis Gabriel Romejko (born 27 December 1963) is a French television host.

== Early life ==
Romejko was born in Meulan, Yvelines, and is of Polish and Lithuanian descent. He graduated from the Ecole Supérieure de Journalisme de Paris.

== Career ==
Romejko began by presenting the Minitel of Enfants du rock on Antenne 2 before going on radio (RFM, Autoroute FM). He joined Télématin in 1989, where he presented a column devoted to future jobs. He also presented the weather. In 1991, he presented the magazine Cajou on Canal J and Selecto on Paris Première. On Télématin, he replaced William Leymergie when he was on vacation.

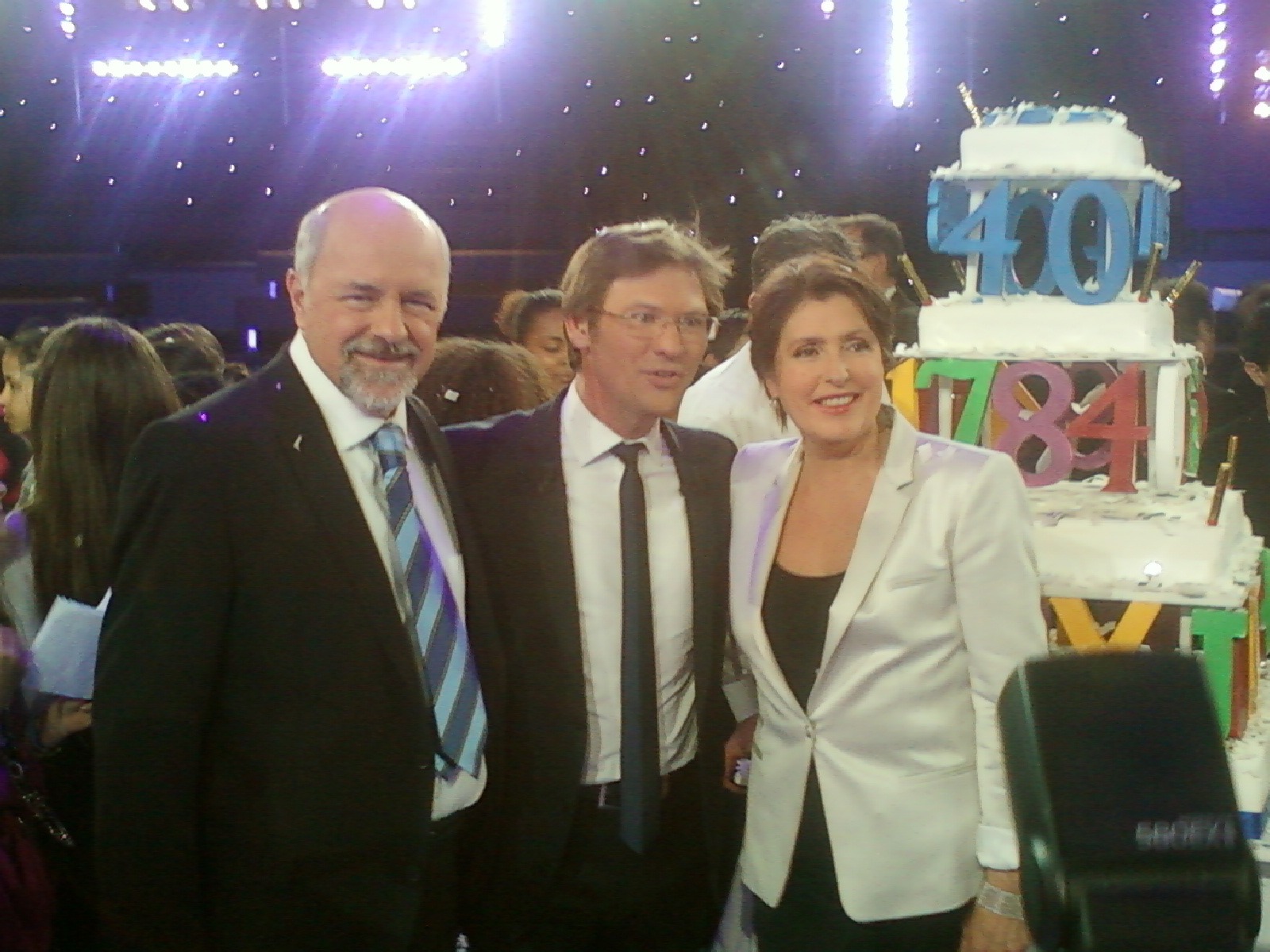
From left: Bertrand Renard, Laurent Romejko and Arielle Boulin-Prat in 2012

From 1994 to 1999, he presented the weather forecast each morning on RFM. In 2000, he participated in the launch of the channel Santé-Vie and hosted a magazine dedicated to health professionals. In September 2006, he presented the weather forecast on France 2, replacing Sophie Davant.

Romejko hosted the program Des chiffres et des lettres from 1992 until its final episode in 2024.
