= Letters and Numbers =

Australian television game show

- Genre: Game show
- Based on: Des chiffres et des lettres by Armand Jammot
- Presented by: Richard Morecroft
- Starring: David Astle; Lily Serna
- Country of origin: Australia
- Original language: English
- No. of series: 6
- No. of episodes: 450

Production
- Camera setup: Multi-camera
- Running time: 24 minutes
- Production company: Shine Australia

Original release
- Network: SBS
- Release: 2 August 2010 – 27 June 2012

Related
- Celebrity Letters and Numbers

Letters and Numbers is an Australian game show on SBS. It is hosted by former newsreader Richard Morecroft, co-hosted by David Astle and Lily Serna. Although it is based on the French game show Des chiffres et des lettres, its structure is similar to the UK version of the show, Countdown – with the titular difference being used to avoid confusion with the Australian music program Countdown.

The series began airing on 2 August 2010. On 22 June 2012 SBS announced its decision to "rest" the show and the final episode aired on 27 June 2012. Repeat episodes were still regularly shown on SBS as of 2025.

On 5 July 2021, SBS announced that Letters and Numbers would be revived in a new series hosted by comedian, journalist and actor Michael Hing. On 3 September 2021, it was revealed that the revival would be a celebrity version of the show, entitled Celebrity Letters and Numbers, and that David Astle and Lily Serna would return to co-host the series which premiered on 2 October 2021.

== Gameplay ==
Two contestants compete against each other in a series of nine rounds, split into three sections. The first two sections consist of two letters rounds followed by a numbers round; the third section consists of a letters round, a numbers round, and the conundrum round. After the first commercial break, Astle would present a story on the origins of particular words and phrases.

The winner of the game returns in the next show to face a new opponent; a player who wins six times is forced to retire, becoming a retired champion, in which case two new contestants will play the next game. Retired champions with the highest cumulative score may return for a special tournament at the end of each series. Every contestant also wins a Macquarie Dictionary 5th Edition, signed by the presenters.

=== Letters round ===
One contestant chooses how many vowels and consonants they would like to make up nine randomly chosen letters. There must be at least three vowels and four consonants. The contestants then have thirty seconds to find the longest word that they can make out of these letters. Any word which appears in the Macquarie Dictionary is allowable, as well as some inflections. The contestant with the longest word is awarded one point for each letter in the word, but nine-letter words, informally called a "Full Monty", count double (thus scoring 18 points). If both contestants find words of equal length then each is awarded points. Proper nouns are not qualified during the Letters rounds.

=== Numbers round ===
One contestant chooses how many "small" and "large" numbers they would like to make up six randomly chosen numbers. Small numbers are between 1 and 10 inclusive, and large numbers are 25, 50, 75, or 100. All large numbers will be different, so at most four large numbers may be chosen. The contestants have to use arithmetic on some or all of those numbers to get as close as possible to a randomly generated three-digit target number within the thirty second time limit. Fractions are not allowed—only integers may be used at any stage of the calculation.

For numbers selections, they are to be straightforward. The numbers are always placed in a fixed order (going right to left – small numbers are placed first, then the large ones).

Points are awarded for the closest solution, and again both contestants score if the solutions are equally close, which can be in opposite directions to each other. 10 points are given for an exact answer, 7 points for a non-exact solution up to 5 from the target, and 5 points for a solution between 6 and 10 from the target. If neither contestant can get within 10, no points are awarded.

All combinations of large and small numbers have informal names:

| Informal Name | Large Numbers | Small Numbers |
|---|---|---|
| Ratpack | Zero | Six |
| Classroom Mix | One | Five |
| Family Mix | Two | Four |
| Even Stevens/Perfect Match | Three | Three |
| Heavyweight | Four | Two |

Other informal names were "Kitchen Sink" (using all six numbers), "Scenic Route" (providing a complicated solution when a simpler one was available), and "Tweaking" (modifying a large number by addition or subtraction before multiplication, usually written out longhand for ease of understanding). E.g. $(100-3) \times 6 = 600 - 18 = 582$

=== Conundrum round ===
A nine-letter anagram made up of two smaller words is given to the contestants who must unscramble the word within the time limit of thirty seconds. The first person to buzz in and correctly identify the word wins 10 points. If a contestant answers incorrectly then they may not guess again and the other contestant has the remaining time to attempt to find the answer. If neither contestant buzzes in with a correct answer during the time limit then no points are awarded. If the scores are tied after the conundrum, tie-breaker conundrums are used until the match is decided.

=== Word Mix ===
Before the commercial break, the audience is given a "Word Mix"—an 8-letter anagram similar to the conundrum, but accompanied by a verbal clue. At the end of the break when the show returns, the anagram is revealed. This does not count towards the scores of the contestants. This is referred to as a 'Teatime Teaser' on the UK version.

=== Origin of Words ===
After the first ad break, after the reveal of the solution to the first word mix and before resuming gameplay, David Astle would present an "Origin of Words" segment, discussing the etymology of several words, usually with an oblique connection to each other.

== List of series ==
At the end of each series, the eight best contestants, those who have acquired the highest cumulative score over the series are invited back to compete in a series of finals. The winner of each series receives a trophy.

| Series | Episodes | Winner | Score | Runner up | Score | Originally released | |
| Series | Episodes | Winner | Score | Runner up | Score | First released | Last released |
|---|---|---|---|---|---|---|---|
| 1 | 100 | Andrew Fisher | 68 | Naween Fernando | 52 | 2 August 2010 | 17 December 2010 |
| 2 | 100 | Tony Loui | 64 | Matthew Thomason | 51 | 20 December 2010 | 6 May 2011 |
| 3 | 100 | Jacob Davey | 60 | Jeremy Schiftan | 49 | 9 May 2011 | 21 October 2011 |
| 4 | 100 | Sam Gaffney | 55 | Alan Nash | 51 | 24 October 2011 | 9 March 2012 |
| 5 | 43 (Note: This series did not feature any finals matches) | —N/a | —N/a | —N/a | —N/a | 12 March 2012 | 9 May 2012 |
| Masters | 7 | Sam Gaffney | 46 | Matthew Thomason | 43 | 19 June 2012 | 27 June 2012 |

Fisher and Fernando from Series 1 have also been rivals outside of Letters and Numbers since the 1990s, having been involved in other mind-puzzle games at tournament level, most notably the Channel News Asia Scrabble Masters tournament held in Singapore in 1999. On that occasion Fernando prevailed in an epic encounter, winning $25,000 to Fisher's $10,000.

After Series 5, the finals series from the first four series were repeated to prepare for the Masters series, which features all of the grand final winners and runners-up, except for Alan Nash, whom semi-finalist Toby Baldwin replaced.

== Products ==
On 1 December 2010, the Letters and Numbers puzzle book was published. Since then, eight volumes have been produced. The puzzles inside are transcribed from each episode of the show. On 1 May 2012, a spin-off puzzle book was released titled Lily's Number Puzzles, which focused on numbers games.

On 4 July 2012, a DVD titled Letters and Numbers: The Masters was released, containing all seven episodes of the Masters series.

== See also ==
- Countdown
- Celebrity Letters and Numbers
- Family Feud
- The Chase Australia
- Wheel of Fortune (Australian game show)
- Who Wants to Be a Millionaire? (Australian game show)
