= Thumb tribe =

Term for people adept at texting

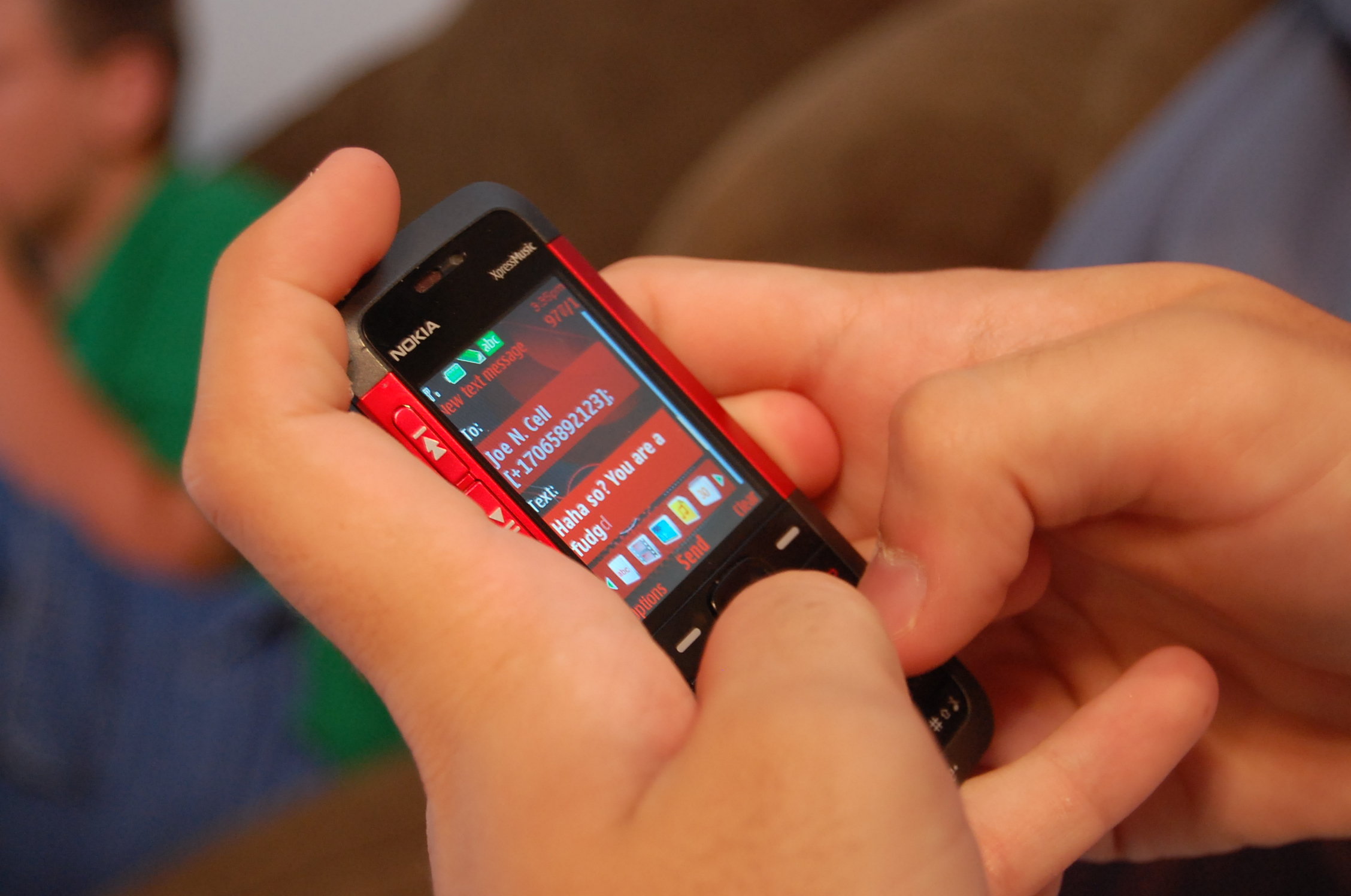
A person texting with thumbs, on a 2008 mobile phone

The thumb tribe (or sometimes thumb generation) are people who are more adept at texting using their thumbs than talking on the phone. The term originated in Japan and became used in other countries over the next few years.

== Background ==
In 2002, a trend was identified among young people who used mobile phones for many activities, such as texting, email, entertainment, and conversations, as opposed to using keyboards with traditional desktop computers. Cybernetic theorist Sadie Plant noted that they often used their thumbs for such messaging, and that in this sense thumbs had become "the new fingers".

Researchers reported in 2002 that this had led to the thumb being physically stronger and more flexible for many young people. There are medical implications as well; excessive use of thumbs can lead to muscle pain and possible occupational problems.

== Usage of the term ==
The term thumb tribe was used in Japan in the 2000s to identify the "younger generation of Japanese texters". Japanese youth used their keitai or mobile phone to download music, access Japan's version of Myspace called mixi, surf the web, check train timetables and so forth. This group is identified as a common source of smart mobs that assemble seemingly spontaneously. The Japanese texting style relies heavily on the thumb, according to a report in NBC News.

They've grown up in a world that is dynamically different from the one we lived in. What kind of cars do they want? And what gadgets? They don't even use computers - computers now perceived as going the way of B&W television. At what point do their childhood toys and t'ween technology devices merge? And what future outcomes do they, and marketer-manufacturers expect?

— H. Martin Calle, 2007

In 2007 the term thumb tribe became used by marketers to identify younger consumers and in politics to identify persons who are not part of the younger generation, such as American politician Mitt Romney, who in 2010 was said to have owned a mobile phone but not been able to use it dexterously.

== See also ==
- Generation Z
- Japanese mobile phone culture
- Millennials
- Phubbing
