= Trappes =

Commune in Île-de-France, France

- Commune
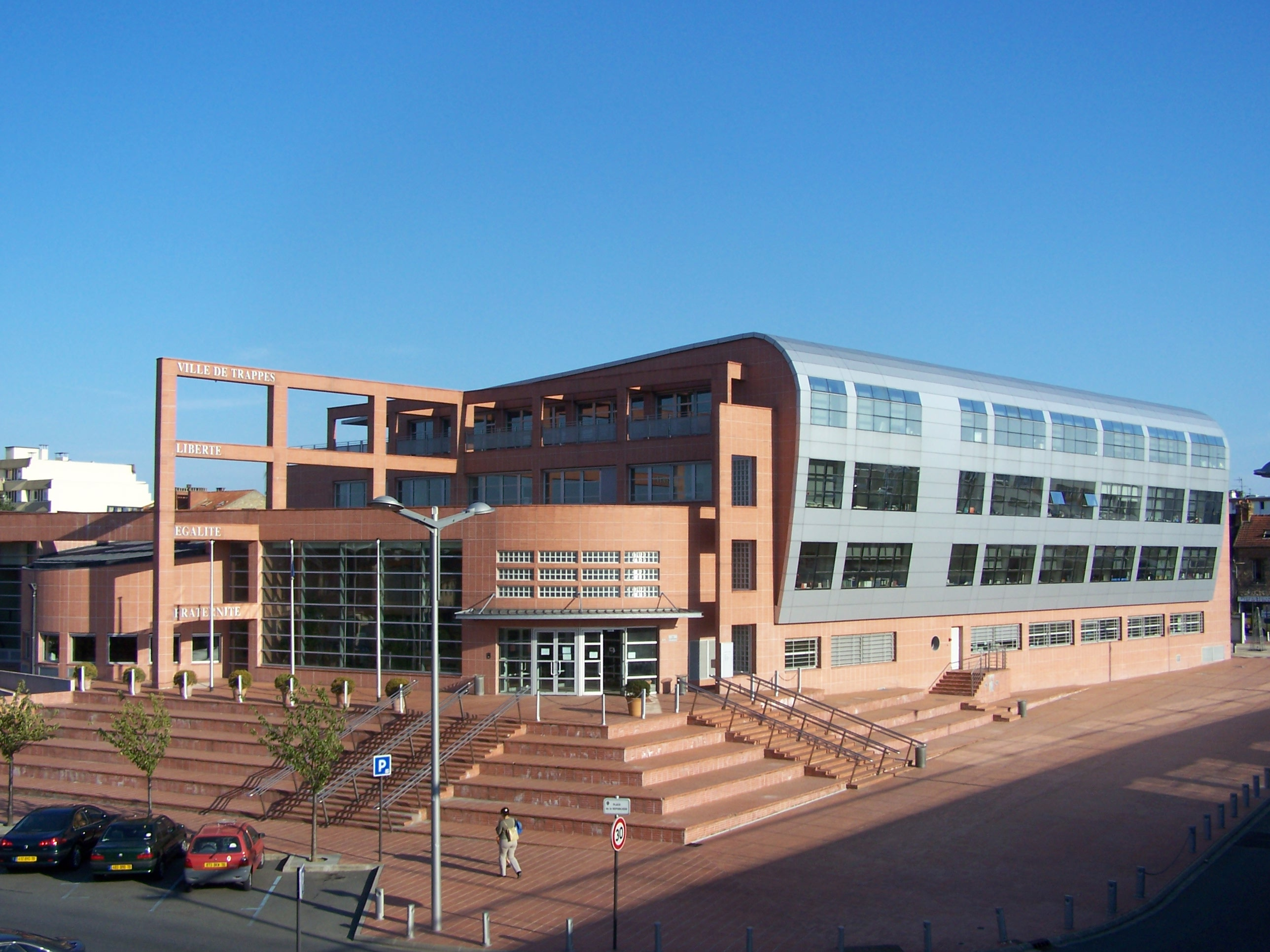
- The Hôtel de Ville

- Coat of arms

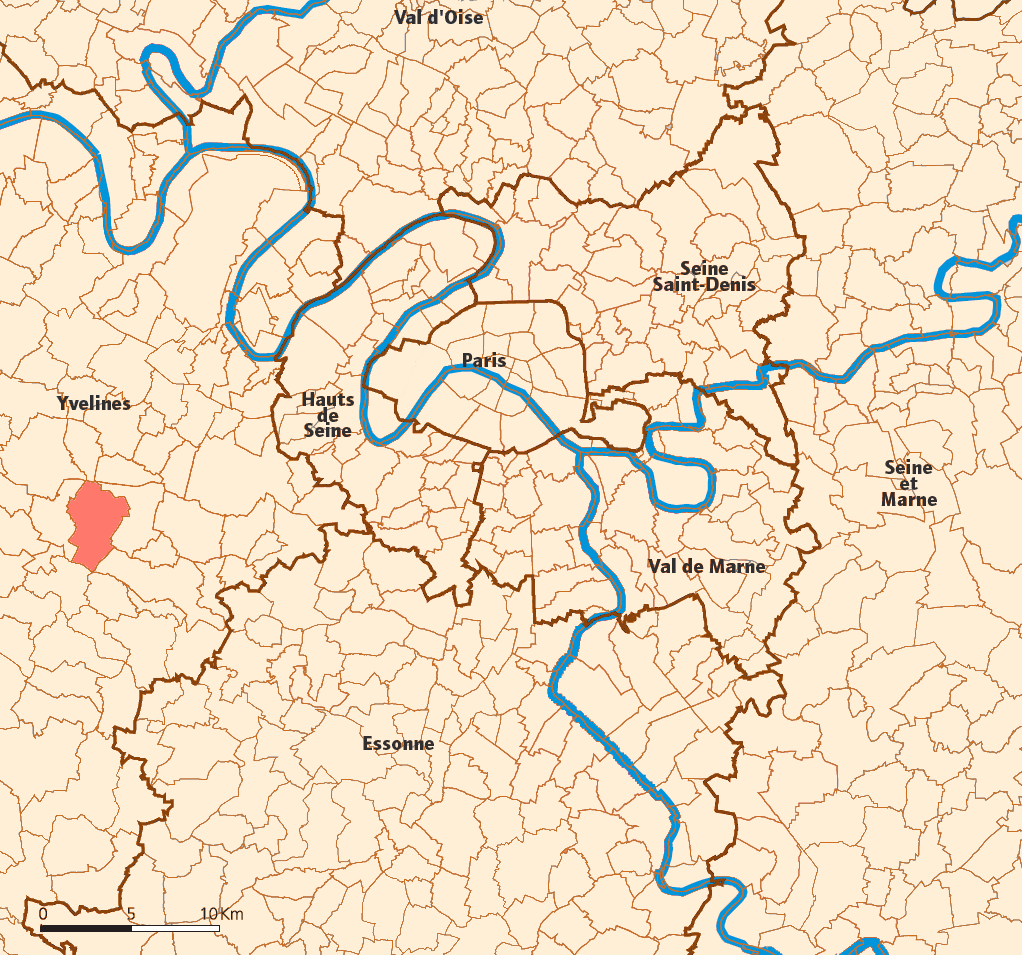
- Location (in red) within Paris inner and outer suburbs
- Location of Trappes
- Location within France Location within Île-de-France (region)
- Coordinates: 48°46′39″N 2°00′09″E
- Country: France
- Region: Île-de-France
- Department: Yvelines
- Arrondissement: Versailles
- Canton: Trappes
- Intercommunality: Saint-Quentin-en-Yvelines

Government
  - Mayor (2021–2026): Ali Rabeh (G.s)
- Area^{1}: 13.47 km^{2} (5.20 sq mi)
- Highest elevation: 174 m (571 ft)
- Lowest elevation: 143 m (469 ft)
- Population (2023): 34,689
  - Density: 2,575/km^{2} (6,670/sq mi)
- Time zone: UTC+01:00 (CET)
  - Summer (DST): UTC+02:00 (CEST)
- INSEE/Postal code: 78621 /78190
- ^{1} French Land Register data, which excludes lakes, ponds, glaciers > 1 km^{2} (0.386 sq mi or 247 acres) and river estuaries.

Trappes (French: [tʁap]) is a commune in the Yvelines department, Île-de-France region, Northern France. It is a banlieue located in the western outer suburbs of Paris, 26.7 km (16.6 mi) from the centre of Paris, part of the new town of Saint-Quentin-en-Yvelines.

== History ==
The Hôtel de Ville was completed in 2000.

== Transport ==
Trappes is served by Trappes station on the Transilien La Défense and Transilien Paris-Montparnasse suburban rail lines.

== Demographics ==
Historical population

Year	Pop.	±% p.a.
1793	561	—
1821	638	+0.46%
1846	809	+0.95%
1872	918	+0.49%
1901	1,114	+0.67%
1921	1,352	+0.97%
1926	1,641	+3.95%
1931	2,604	+9.67%
1936	3,419	+5.60%
1946	3,216	−0.61%
1954	4,885	+5.36%

Year	Pop.	±% p.a.
1962	9,643	+8.87%
1968	16,799	+9.69%
1975	22,895	+4.52%
1982	29,763	+3.82%
1990	30,878	+0.46%
1999	28,812	−0.77%
2007	29,327	+0.22%
2012	29,774	+0.30%
2017	32,584	+1.82%
2023	34,689	+1.05%

From the year 1962 on: population without double counting
Source: Cassini and INSEE

== Crime ==
Gang violence and poverty is elevated in Trappes. There are also Islamists among its Muslim population, with 70 locals suspected of having left to Iraq and Syria to fight for the Islamic State in the 2010s.

In July 2013, mob attacked the local police station following the arrest of a man who had assaulted a police officer during an identity check on his wife (the burqa is illegal in France). In August 2018, a man on the terror watchlist killed his mother and sister before being shot dead by police. While the Islamic State claimed responsibility, French interior minister Gérard Collomb described the man as “unstable,” rather than likely to follow the terror group’s instructions.

In October 2026, a man killed a person and wounded five others in a spree shooting targeting three neighborhoods, which President Macron described as a racist terror attack. The antiterrorism prosecutor opened an investigation into the suspects racist or islamophobic motives.

== Education ==
There are 36 municipal preschools and primary schools in Trappes.

The community has three junior high schools:

- Collège Le Village
- Collège Gustave Courbet
- Collège Youri-Gagarine

Senior high schools/sixth form colleges:

- Lycée des métiers Louis Blériot
- Lycée des métiers Henri Matisse
- Lycée de la Plaine de Neauphle

== Climate ==
Climate data for Trappes, elevation: 167 m (548 ft) (1991–2020 normals, extremes 1923-present)
Month	Jan	Feb	Mar	Apr	May	Jun	Jul	Aug	Sep	Oct	Nov	Dec	Year
Record high °C (°F)	16.0 (60.8)	20.3 (68.5)	24.7 (76.5)	28.0 (82.4)	32.0 (89.6)	39.0 (102.2)	40.6 (105.1)	39.1 (102.4)	34.6 (94.3)	29.0 (84.2)	21.0 (69.8)	16.8 (62.2)	40.6 (105.1)
Mean daily maximum °C (°F)	6.8 (44.2)	8.0 (46.4)	11.9 (53.4)	15.4 (59.7)	18.8 (65.8)	22.1 (71.8)	24.6 (76.3)	24.6 (76.3)	20.7 (69.3)	15.8 (60.4)	10.4 (50.7)	7.2 (45.0)	15.5 (59.9)
Daily mean °C (°F)	4.3 (39.7)	4.9 (40.8)	7.9 (46.2)	10.7 (51.3)	14.1 (57.4)	17.3 (63.1)	19.5 (67.1)	19.4 (66.9)	16.0 (60.8)	12.2 (54.0)	7.6 (45.7)	4.8 (40.6)	11.6 (52.9)
Mean daily minimum °C (°F)	1.9 (35.4)	1.8 (35.2)	3.9 (39.0)	6.0 (42.8)	9.4 (48.9)	12.5 (54.5)	14.4 (57.9)	14.2 (57.6)	11.3 (52.3)	8.5 (47.3)	4.8 (40.6)	2.4 (36.3)	7.6 (45.7)
Record low °C (°F)	−15.8 (3.6)	−15.6 (3.9)	−10.5 (13.1)	−4.1 (24.6)	−1.2 (29.8)	0.1 (32.2)	2.0 (35.6)	4.0 (39.2)	−0.5 (31.1)	−5.2 (22.6)	−8.9 (16.0)	−14.3 (6.3)	−15.8 (3.6)
Average precipitation mm (inches)	56.2 (2.21)	49.9 (1.96)	50.1 (1.97)	49.9 (1.96)	66.0 (2.60)	57.0 (2.24)	56.3 (2.22)	56.1 (2.21)	49.8 (1.96)	61.8 (2.43)	61.2 (2.41)	72.0 (2.83)	686.3 (27.02)
Average precipitation days (≥ 1.0 mm)	11.0	10.4	9.8	8.7	9.7	8.7	7.9	8.4	7.9	10.6	11.4	12.2	116.6
Average snowy days	3.1	3.9	2.3	0.9	0.0	0.0	0.0	0.0	0.0	0.1	1.2	3.0	14.5
Mean monthly sunshine hours	57.0	80.6	133.7	175.8	201.7	209.6	222.3	216.3	176.9	116.8	67.6	55.3	1,713.8
Source 1: Meteociel
Source 2: Infoclimat.fr (snowy days)

== Notable people ==
- Nicolas Anelka, footballer
- Odile Bailleux, organist and harpsichordist
- Eddy Ben Arous, rugby player
- Barbara Cabrita, actress
- Jamel Debbouze, comedian and actor
- La Fouine, rapper
- Massadio Haïdara, footballer
- Kevin Harley, basketball player
- Cyril Paglino, entrepreneur
- Linda Pradel, handball player
- Shy'm, singer
- Omar Sy, comedian and actor

== Freedom of Trappes/Honorary Citizens of Trappes ==
- Rolland Beardmore

== Twin towns – sister cities ==
Trappes is twinned with:

- Castiglione del Lago, Italy (1971)
- Congleton, England, United Kingdom (1962)
- Kopřivnice, Czech Republic (1970)

== See also ==
- Communes of the Yvelines department
