= Jenny Tian =

Australian comedian (born 1995)

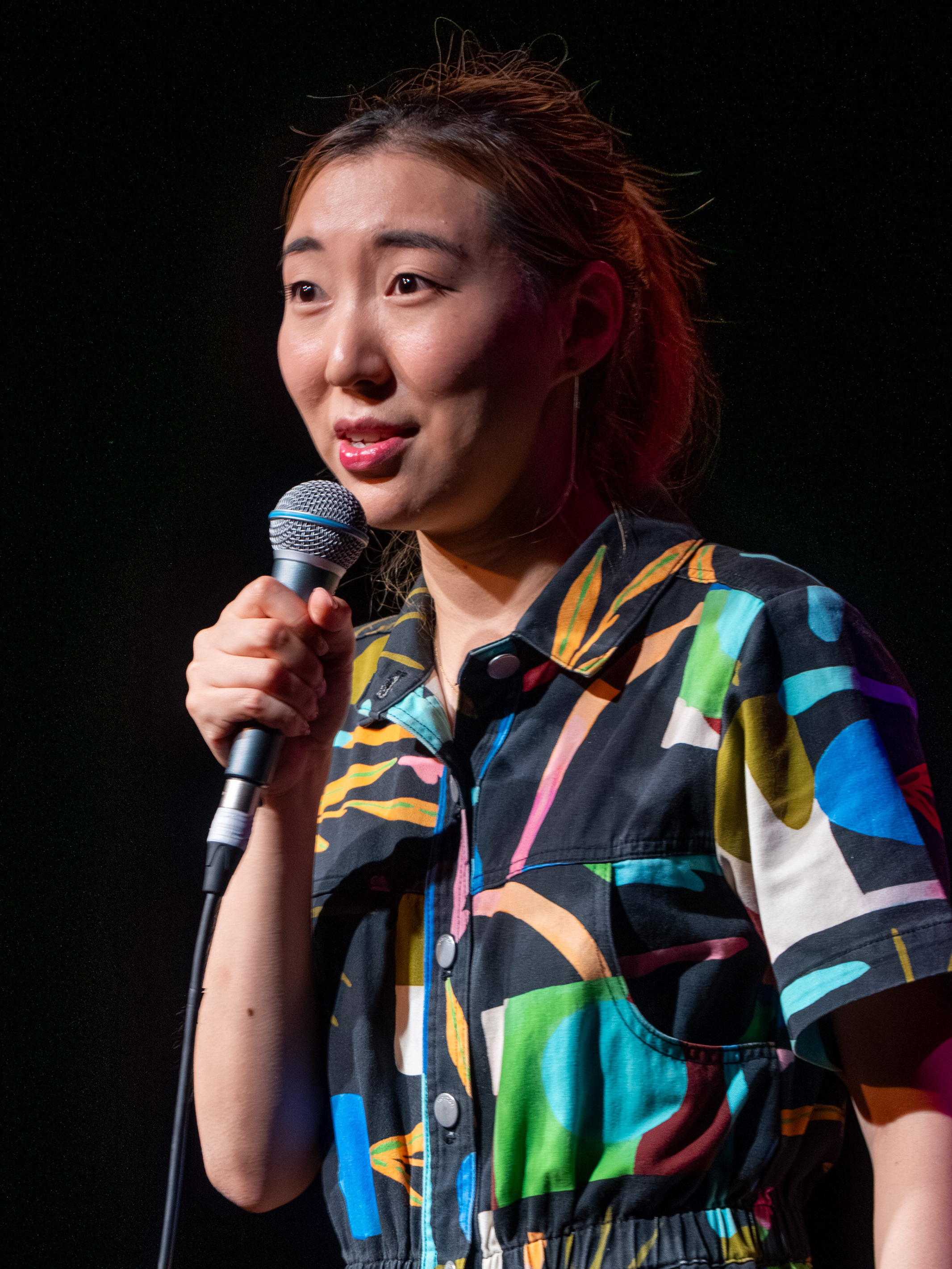
- Tian at the 2025 Edinburgh Festival Fringe
- Born: Jeanne Tian; 24 July 1995 (age 31); Finland
- Citizenship: Australia
- Education: University of New South Wales
- Occupation: Comedian
- Years active: 2019–present

Jeanne Tian (born 24 July 1995) is an Australian comedian. Known for both her TikTok and YouTube presence, Tian has also performed live stand-up shows and appeared on television and podcasts.

Tian was born in Finland to Chinese parents and moved to Sydney, New South Wales, Australia, when she was three and a half years old. Tian graduated from the University of New South Wales with double bachelor's degrees in arts and commerce; she was inspired to perform stand-up after a performance by Ronny Chieng at her university.

Tian premiered her first show, Picture This, in 2023. She performed her show Chinese Australian: A Tale of Internet Fame in 2024 at Wellington Fringe and the Melbourne International Comedy Festival.

On television Tian has appeared on Celebrity Letters and Numbers and The Feed. Tian also was a contestant on the second season of Taskmaster Australia, and hosts the podcast The Parasocial Social Club with Kevin Jin. In 2025 she appeared as a contestant on Claire Hooper's House of Games.

As of 2024, Tian is represented by Creative Representation. In July 2024, it was announced by Screen Australia that she would be co-creating a comedy series titled Supermarket with Patrick Golamco.
