= Snub =

Refusal to recognise an acquaintance

Who's your fat friend? The famous occasion when Beau Brummell cut the Prince Regent by pretending not to know him in 1813.

A snub, cut, or slight is a refusal to recognise an acquaintance by ignoring them, avoiding them or pretending not to know them. For example, a failure to greet someone may be considered a snub.

== In awards and lists ==
For awards, the term "snub" is usually used to refer to a work or person that fails to be nominated or win award, with whether or not a person or work was legitimately snubbed for an award has often been subject for public debate. The term "snub" has also been used in relation to lists, such as the NBA 75th Anniversary Team. Many notable people and works have failed to be nominated or win a major award. For example, Alfred Hitchcock and Stanley Kubrick never won best director at the Oscars despite being nominated five and four times respectively, and Glenn Close, Peter O'Toole, Deborah Kerr, Sigourney Weaver and Cicely Tyson have never won an Oscar related to acting despite each having multiple nominations. Among films, Citizen Kane, E.T. the Extra-Terrestrial, Goodfellas, Brokeback Mountain, and Saving Private Ryan are all widely considered to be movies snubbed for the Best Picture Oscar, while The Searchers received no Oscar nominations at all despite being considered one of the best films of all time. The widely acclaimed actor Donald Sutherland, was never nominated for an Oscar, even though the films in which he starred in leading roles, such as M*A*S*H (1970), Klute (1971) and Ordinary People (1980), were nominated and won several Oscars, including his fellow actors.

For the Emmy Awards, The Fresh Prince of Bel-Air and The Wire were never nominated for best comedy and best drama despite their critical acclaim. The Late Late Show with Craig Ferguson, Drunk History and the Seinfeld episode "The Soup Nazi" are also generally considered major snubs from the Emmys as well. Angela Lansbury, Sandra Oh, Don Cheadle, Steve Carell, Anthony Anderson, and Hugh Laurie are also known for having never won an acting award at the Emmys despite each being nominated at least ten times. Michael Landon was notably also never nominated for an acting Emmy despite his popular appeal.

Some have suggested that some athletes have been snubbed from winning season-ending sports awards despite having great years statistically such as Jim Brown failing to win the 1956 Heisman Trophy and Ted Williams failing to win the 1941 and 1942 American League MVP award.

== See also ==
- Boycott
- Ostracism
- Outcast
- Send to Coventry
- Phubbing
- Shunning
- Silent treatment
- Social rejection
- Cancel culture
