= MILF (2018 film) =

2018 film by Axelle Laffont

- Theatrical release poster
- Directed by: Axelle Laffont
- Screenplay by: Axelle Laffont; Jean-François Halin
- Based on: An original screenplay by Jérôme L'hotsky; Stéphane Kramer
- Produced by: Julien Madon
- Starring: Virginie Ledoyen; Marie-Josée Croze; Axelle Laffont; Matthias Dandois; Victor Meutelet; Waël Sersoub; Florence Thomassin
- Cinematography: Pierre Aïm
- Edited by: Clemence Samson
- Music by: Ben Molinaro
- Production companies: Single Man Productions; StudioCanal; Nexus Factory; Umedia; Le Labo
- Distributed by: StudioCanal
- Release date: 2 May 2018 (France)
- Running time: 101 minutes
- Countries: France; Belgium
- Language: French
- Box office: $1.1 million

MILF is a 2018 sex comedy film directed by Axelle Laffont (in her feature directorial debut) and starring Virginie Ledoyen, Marie-Josée Croze, and Laffont. The film was released in France on 2 May 2018.

== Premise ==
A trio of forty-something women who begin dating younger men while on vacation. The trio, Sonia, Cécile, and Elise, are friends who travel to the French Riviera to help Cécile prepare her vacation home to be sold.

During their vacation, they meet three men in their twenties – Julien, Paul, and Markus (a former family friend of Cécile's), who work at a local sailing club. The men are immediately interested in the women, who they have deemed "MILFs". The six of them spend a lot of time together as a summer fling; the film ends on their last day of vacation.

== Cast ==
- Marie-Josée Croze as Sonia
- Virginie Ledoyen as Cécile
- Axelle Laffont as Elise
- Waël Sersoub as Paul
- Matthias Dandois as Julien
- Victor Meutelet as Markus
- Rémi Pedevilla as Thomas
- Florence Thomassin as Christine
- Jéromine Chasseriaud as Louise (credited as Jérômine Chass)
- Mitty Hazanavicius as Nina (Axelle Laffont daughter in real life)
- Pauline Bression as Maya
- Claude Attia as M. Layrac
- Anne-Marie Ponsot as Mme Layrac
- Pierre Lopez as Michel
- Amy Lindsay as Holly
- Robert Assolen as Showman (credited as Bob Assolen)

== Release ==
MILF was released in France on 2 May 2018. It earned $417,231 from 249 theaters in its opening weekend, finishing 10th. The film went on to gross $961,745 in France and a combined $174,890 from Ukraine and Russia, for a worldwide gross of $1.1 million. The film was released on Netflix in the United States in July 2020.

=== Critical response ===
On review aggregator Rotten Tomatoes, the film holds an approval rating of 14% based on seven reviews, with an average rating of 2.9/10.
