= The Race (2002 film) =

- Theatrical release poster
- Directed by: Djamel Bensalah
- Written by: Djamel Bensalah; Gilles Laurent
- Produced by: Samantha Berger; Patrice Ledoux
- Starring: Hélène de Fougerolles; Roschdy Zem
- Cinematography: Pascal Gennesseaux
- Edited by: Fabrice Rouaud
- Music by: Barry Adamson
- Production company: Gaumont
- Distributed by: Gaumont Buena Vista International
- Release date: 27 March 2002
- Running time: 94 minutes
- Country: France
- Language: French
- Budget: $20 million
- Box office: $7.5 million

The Race (French original title Le Raid) is a 2002 French movie directed by Djamel Bensalah starring Hélène de Fougerolles and Roschdy Zem.

== Plot ==
Four pathetic narrow minded petty criminals are mistaken for hitmen while ordered to shadow the philandering girl friend of their crime boss Carlito. As a result of a misunderstanding they get hired to accompany Léonore de Segonzac, the heiress of a big asset, on a race through Patagonia and "accidentally" kill her for the sum of four million dollars. They are chased by the principal and the true killers, which for their part are hunted by some UNO blue helmets.

== Cast ==
- Hélène de Fougerolles as Léonore de Segonzac
- Roschdy Zem as Sami
- Atmen Kelif as Yaya
- Lorànt Deutsch as Tacchini
- Julien Courbey as Kader
- Josiane Balasko as Madame Jo
- Maurice Barthélémy as Momo
- Gérard Jugnot as Carlito
- Didier Flamand as Lino
- Pascal Elbé as Mathias Morin
- Yves Rénier as UN Colonel
- Mouss Diouf as UN Captain
- Omar Sy as UN Sergeant
- Axelle Laffont as Nathalie
- Marina Foïs as Young nurse
- Sacha Bourdo as Windshield cleaner
