= Reuben Kaye =

Australian comedy cabaret performer (born 1984)

- Born: Reuben Krum; 1984 (age 41–42); Australia

Comedy career
- Genres: Comedy, cabaret, drag
- Website: https://www.reubenkaye.com/

Reuben Kaye (né Krum; born 1984) is an Australian singer, writer, drag artist and comedian. Kaye's career is primarily based in the United Kingdom, but he has performed at comedy festivals internationally, including in Melbourne, Montréal, and Edinburgh. Since 2019, Kaye has hosted the comedy podcast Come to Daddy, in which he interviews other comedians, and has made numerous appearances on television as well as having a role as a voice actor in an animated film released in 2024.

== Early life and education ==
Kaye was born as Reuben Krum in 1984 to painter and sculptor Lazar Krum and filmmaker Karin Altmann. Grandparents on both sides were Jewish immigrants who fled Europe during or after World War II. His maternal grandmother became a couturier on Collins Street, Melbourne.

Kaye was raised in the Melbourne suburb of Kew. He was diagnosed with ADHD as a child, but his parents chose to not put him on medication.

He came out as gay at age 14, and faced bullying from his peers at school which left him with a scar on his eyebrow.

He studied musical theatre at the Victorian College of the Arts.

== Style and artistry ==
Kaye is recognisable for his signature drag makeup, and often performs with a full backing band. His performances combine stand-up comedy and cabaret, and are queer and political.

He has cited Wayne County & the Electric Chairs, Patti LaBelle, and Marianne Faithful as some of his inspirations.

== Career ==
=== Live performances ===
Kaye began performing cabaret while living in Melbourne, but became more involved in the scene after moving to London at the age of 25. Kaye began wearing makeup during his performances in 2011, attributing the choice as a channel for his material, rather than self-expression.

His first solo show, Success Story, debuted in 2017, and was performed at the Perth and Adelaide Fringe festivals. In 2019, Kaye created the self-titled show Reuben Kaye, as well as a late-night variety show The Kaye Hole, and brought both shows to the Edinburgh Fringe. Kaye returned to performances in 2021 after the COVID pandemic and vocal surgery with his new show The Butch is Back, which he performed through December 2023, including in at the Edinburgh and Melbourne comedy festivals, and at a nearly month-long residency in London's Southbank Centre. His 2023 Edinburgh fringe show was the second-highest reviewed show at the festival.

Starting at the Perth Fringe in January 2024, Kaye began performing his new show Apocalipstick.

=== Television appearances ===
In 2019, Kaye appeared on British television on the Channel 4 show Kids React to Drag. He has also appeared on other UK shows, such as The Apprentice: You’re Fired in 2023.

He has also appeared on Australian television programmes like Spicks and Specks, The Project, and Celebrity Letters and Numbers.

In 2023, Kaye appeared on an episode of the Channel 10 news and talk show programme The Project, where he controversially joked about Jesus: "I love any man who can get nailed for three days straight and come back for more!" The Australian Communications and Media Authority reportedly received over 200 complaints about the incident. He received significant backlash for this both from publications like the Daily Mail, as well as from social media users, some of whom sent him death threats. Subsequent live performances by Kaye were postponed due to protests against him.

=== Podcasts ===
Since 2019, Kaye has hosted Come to Daddy, a podcast about the parental upbringing of various comedian guests, including Rosie Jones, Desiree Burch, and Daniel Sloss. At the 2023 Just for Laughs festival, Kaye hosted the first live version of the podcast with guest Urzila Carlson.

Kaye has also guested on numerous other podcasts, including Jordan Gray's Transplaining, Catherine Bohart and Helen Bauer's Trusty Hogs, and Abigoliah Schamaun and Joe Wells's Neurodivergent Moments.

=== Film ===
Kaye was one of a cast of voice actors in the Australian science fiction comedy feature film Lesbian Space Princess, which premiered at the Adelaide Film Festival in October 2024.

== Other roles ==
In July 2025, Kaye was appointed artistic director of the 2026 Adelaide Cabaret Festival.

== Recognition and awards ==
In 2021, Kaye won the Best Cabaret award from both the Perth and Adelaide fringe festivals, and was nominated for the Most Outstanding Show award from the Melbourne Comedy Festival.

In 2022, The Butch Is Back won three Green Room Awards for Best Cabaret Artist, Best Production and Best Musical Direction. In 2023, it also was nominated for NextUp's Biggest Award in Comedy, and placed second on the British Comedy Guide's list of the highest-reviewed shows of the 2023 Edinburgh fringe.
