= Richard Carleton =

Australian journalist (1943–2006)

- Born: 11 July 1943; Bowral, New South Wales, Australia
- Died: 7 May 2006 (aged 62); Beaconsfield, Tasmania, Australia
- Education: Sydney Grammar School; University of New South Wales
- Occupation: journalist
- Years active: 1967−2006
- Notable credit(s): This Day Tonight; Tonight; The Carleton-Walsh Report; 60 Minutes
- Spouse: Sharon Carleton
- Children: Oliver Carleton, James Carleton, Jennifer Carleton

Richard George Carleton (11 July 1943 – 7 May 2006) was a multiple Logie Award–winning Australian television journalist.

== Education ==
Carleton was born in Bowral, New South Wales. He was educated at Sydney Grammar School and graduated from the University of New South Wales. He was the third of four children – Joffre, Graeme, Richard and Joanne.

== Television/journalism career ==
=== ABC/BBC ===
In the 1960s, he was a reporter on This Day Tonight as well as being the presenter of State of the Nation, both on the ABC. He continued these roles until he left for a role on 2GB Radio in 1976, followed by what began as a lifelong love of travelling and researching overseas, producing films in Indonesia (including being the only journalist to be allowed to visit the newly "integrated" East Timor) and the Middle East. Carleton joined the BBC in London in 1977 for the Tonight program, before returning to Australia in 1979.

Carleton is probably most famously known for a comment made to the incoming federal Australian Labor Party leader Bob Hawke in 1983: "Mr. Hawke, could I ask you whether you feel a little embarrassed tonight at the blood that's on your hands?", which was a reference to the alleged involvement of Hawke in the resignation of former Labor leader Bill Hayden. The question irritated Hawke, who criticised Carleton for his "damned impertinence".

Carleton ran for election in 1983 as the staff representative on the ABC Board. He was defeated by Tom Molomby, who wrote: "His was a remarkable policy statement, the most blatant demonstration of political cynicism (I cannot believe it was the only other alternative, stupidity) which I have ever seen in an ABC election.". During 1986, Carleton was a co-presenter of The Carleton-Walsh Report on the ABC, with financial journalist Max Walsh.

=== Nine Network ===
In 1987, Carleton began his most famous television journalism role, as a reporter on 60 Minutes. In a career with the program that spanned almost 20 years, he visited many locations around the world investigating political climates. In 2006, he and producer Stephen Rice visited Chernobyl and were given unprecedented access to the sarcophagus built over the ruined nuclear reactor, including a brief visit to the abandoned control room. Carleton was parodied on the Australian sketch-comedy shows Fast Forward and Comedy Inc. for his perceived over-prominence on 60 Minutes.

In July 2000, the ABC's Media Watch program accused Carleton of plagiarising the BBC documentary A Cry from the Grave. Carleton denied the claims, suing the Australian Broadcasting Corporation for defamation. In 2002 the case was heard, and the judge found that while Carleton had "misled his audience by misrepresenting a mass grave site shown in the program, and that 60 Minutes had copied film directly from the British documentary", the allegations made by Media Watch were in fact untrue and had defamed Carleton. Carleton was greatly relieved by the ruling. (However, the judge also found Media Watch was entitled to express the views it formed and eventually awarded costs against Channel Nine and to the ABC.). Media Watch themselves claimed that Carleton had interpreted the judgement as favouring him, when they believed it didn't, and they refused to apologise.

Carleton won five Penguin Awards and three Logie Awards during his time with 60 Minutes and at the ABC.

== Death ==
Carleton had experienced a number of health scares; the first was in 1988 when he underwent heart bypass surgery, which was filmed for 60 Minutes, and another in 2003 when he suffered a heart attack. In 2005, he was diagnosed with prostate cancer. On 7 May 2006, Carleton collapsed from a massive heart attack during a press conference at the Beaconsfield gold mine, shortly after questioning mine manager Matthew Gill on previous safety issues at the site. First-hand reports from the scene indicated that Carleton had a weak pulse when taken by ambulance to the Launceston General Hospital and that he had been puffing and gasping not long before he collapsed. Carleton died at 2:12 p.m, in the ambulance on the way to hospital. His last words were:

On 26 October last year, not 10 metres from where these men are now entombed, you had a 400-tonne rock fall. Why is it, is it the strength of the seam, or the wealth of the seam, that you continue to send men into work in such a dangerous environment?

In the 2012 telemovie about the incident, Beaconsfield, Carleton was played by Steve Vizard.

In 2017, his garden was featured on the television program Gardening Australia and was introduced by his wife Sharon.
