= David Astle =

Australian TV personality and radio host

- Born: David Robert Astle; 9 November 1961 (age 64); Sydney, Australia
- Occupations: TV personality, radio host, writer, playwright, crossword compiler
- Known for: Letters and Numbers, Newspaper crosswords

David Robert Astle (born 9 November 1961) is an Australian TV personality and radio host, and writer of non-fiction, fiction and plays. He also co-hosted the SBS Television (SBS) show Letters and Numbers, as the dictionary expert, in company with Richard Morecroft and Lily Serna, a role to which he returned for Celebrity Letters and Numbers in 2021.

== Career ==
Astle's cryptic crosswords, appearing under the name "DA" in The Age and The Sydney Morning Herald (for which he also writes the "Wordplay" section), have developed a large following which includes musician Holly Throsby and actor Geoffrey Rush, who called him "the Sergeant Pepper of cryptic crosswords". In 2011, his portrait called "DA" painted by artist Amanda Marburg, was shortlisted for the Archibald Prize.

Astle's 2013 book Cluetopia: The story of 100 years of the crossword celebrates the centenary of the crossword with a chapter for each year. Astle is a three times winner of the Banjo Paterson Writing Award. He won third prize in The Age Short Story Award in 1990 and his first novel, Marzipan Plan, was shortlisted for the Miles Franklin Award. In 2001 he won the James Joyce Suspended Sentence Award for short fiction. His play Cowboy Humour was part of the Short and Sweet play festival in 2008, which has previously featured Astle's plays including The Gentleman Had An Axe in 2007 and The Mercy Kitchen.

Astle has taught journalism at RMIT University and in 2004 was awarded a DSC Teaching Award for best sessional teacher. In 2013, he helped create the word "phub" (a portmanteau of phone and snub), for when someone is ignored in favour of a mobile phone.

=== Radio & Television ===
In 2010, Astle was part of Letters and Numbers, an Australian reboot of the UK series Countdown. Astle was the dictionary expert alongside host Richard Morecroft and maths expert Lily Serna. The show was produced by Shine Australia and ran for two seasons on SBS TV.

From 2015, Astle was a fill-in host on ABC Radio Melbourne as well as a regular word expert on ABC TV's News Breakfast.

In December 2019, Astle was appointed host of the Evenings radio program on ABC Radio Melbourne and ABC Local Radio in Victoria replacing Lindy Burns. Throughout 2019 Astle filled in for Burns whilst she was on long service leave.

In 2021, Celebrity Letters and Numbers was created with Astle returning as dictionary expert alongside Serna and new host Michael Hing. The show is currently in its third season and has featured guests including Nakkaih Lui, Aaron Chen and Benjamin Law.

== Bibliography ==
=== Novels ===
- Marzipan Plan
- The Book of Miles (Minerva, 1997) 1-86330-589-0

=== Non-fiction ===
- "Rewording the Brain" (Allen & Unwin, 2018) ISBN 9781760295486
- "Riddledom: 101 Riddles and Their Stories" (Allen & Unwin, 2015) ISBN 9781760112608
- "Cluetopia: The story of 100 years of the crossword" (Allen & Unwin, 2013) ISBN 9781743314531
- "Puzzles and Words 1" (Allen & Unwin, 2013) 9781743318546
- "Puzzles and Words 2" (Allen & Unwin, 2013) 9781743318546
- Puzzled: Secrets and Clues From a Life Lost in Words (Allen & Unwin, 2010) ISBN 9781742372785
- Cassowary Crossing (Penguin Books, 2005) ISBN 0-14-300169-8; (re-jacketed as Offbeat Australia (Penguin Books, 2007) ISBN 978-0-14-300742-5)
- One Down, One Missing (Hardie Grant Books, 2003) 9781740661416

=== For children ===
- Wordburger (Allen & Unwin, 2015) ISBN 9781760113575
- David Astle's Gargantuan Book of Words (Allen & Unwin, 2017) ISBN 9781760296223
- David Astle's 101 Weird Words (and 3 fakes): From Ambidextrous to Zugzwang (Allen & Unwin, 2018) ISBN 9781760633660

=== Plays ===
- The Gentleman Had an Axe (2007)
- Cowboy Humour (2008)
- The Mercy Kitchen (2008)
