= Phubbing =

Snubbing a person for a mobile phone

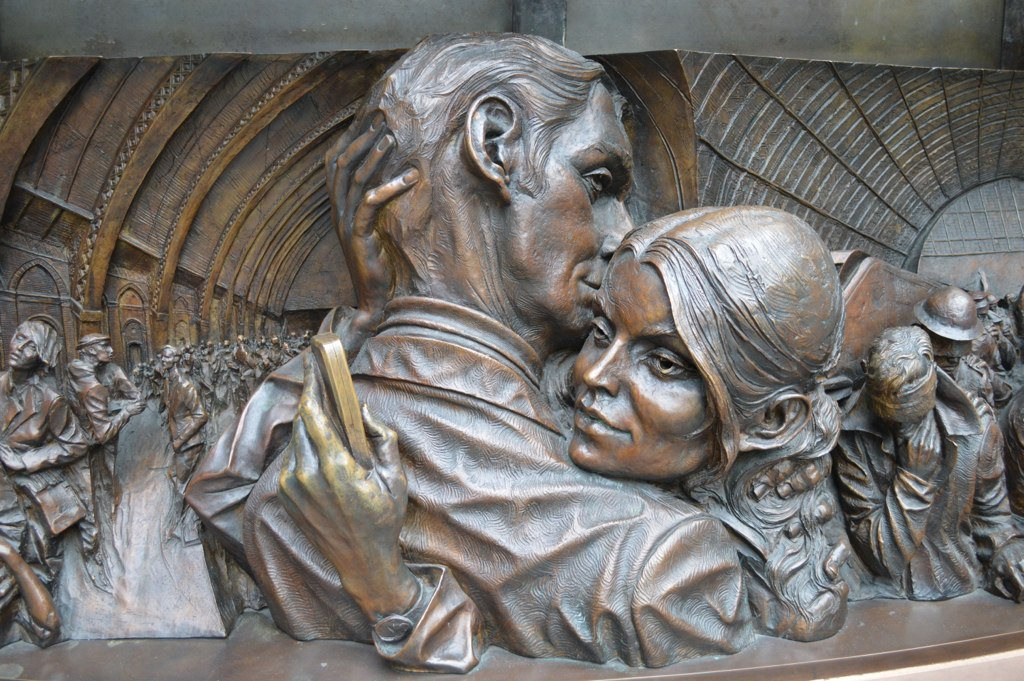
Detail of Paul Day's 2007 sculpture The Meeting Place, showing a woman looking at her mobile phone while in an embrace

Phubbing refers to the act of ignoring one's immediate social interactions in favor of engaging with a smartphone, making it a prevalent behavior in today's digital age. While it is frequently associated with the concept of fear of missing out (FOMO), the current body of research presents conflicting evidence regarding the strength and consistency of this relationship. In May 2012, as part of a linguistic experiment by Macquarie Dictionary, the advertising agency behind the campaign, McCann, had invited a number of lexicographers, authors, and poets to coin a neologism to describe the behavior. The word "phubbing," a portmanteau of phone and snubbing, was first described by McCann Group Account Director Adrian Mills, who was working with David Astle. The term has appeared in media around the world and was popularized by the Stop Phubbing campaign created by McCann.

Despite its growing relevance, no standardized method exists to measure phubbing behaviors or their effects. Existing tools have been developed with limited attention to psychometric properties or broad applicability, creating challenges for advancing research in this area. To address these gaps, recent studies aim to create validated scales that capture the complex dimensions of phubbing, contributing to a more comprehensive understanding of its impact on social interactions and individual well-being.

== How phubbing manifests ==
Phubbing typically manifests in various social contexts where individuals prioritize their smartphones over face-to-face interactions, leading to a breakdown in meaningful communication. It has become increasingly common to observe groups of friends engrossed in their devices, couples at restaurants ignoring one another while staring at their screens, or families spending time together yet disconnected by their preoccupation with smartphones. This behavior is not confined to personal settings; it extends to workplaces, where professionals often divert their attention from colleagues to their devices. Over time, phubbing has evolved into a socially accepted norm, undermining the quality of interpersonal relationships and healthy communication.

Furthermore, the habitual nature of phubbing reinforces its cyclical impact: as individuals use their phones to escape stress or loneliness, they inadvertently weaken their relationships, leading to greater isolation and reliance on their devices. This pattern not only exacerbates psychological challenges such as anxiety and depression but also raises broader concerns about how technology shapes social norms and values. Addressing these issues requires a deeper understanding of the motivations behind phubbing and its effects on mental health and social connections. Efforts to mitigate phubbing's impact must balance the benefits of technology with the need for meaningful, face-to-face interactions to preserve the integrity of human relationships.

== Phubbing and technology ==
The pervasive design of app notifications, algorithms, and user interfaces plays a pivotal role in fostering phubbing behavior. These features are engineered to capture user attention, often at the expense of in-person interactions. Central to this dynamic is smart push technology, which delivers personalized, real-time updates to users. While this technology enhances convenience, it also amplifies Fear of Missing Out (FoMO), a psychological phenomenon defined as the anxiety of being excluded from rewarding experiences. By continuously pushing tailored content, apps entice users to engage compulsively, distracting them from their immediate social environment.

The timeliness of content delivery, a hallmark of push notifications, adds another layer of complexity. Constant updates induce information overload, leaving users overwhelmed yet compelled to stay updated. This creates a cognitive loop where users feel pressured to remain engaged, even at the cost of neglecting their physical surroundings. Over time, this cycle fosters a dependency on smartphones, making phubbing a habitual behavior.

== Parental phubbing and its effects on children ==
Parental phubbing, the act of parents prioritizing smartphone use over engagement with their children, poses a significant threat to children's social-emotional development. This behavior disrupts parent-child interactions, often leading to feelings of neglect and reduced emotional connection for children.

A study by Liu et al. involving 726 adolescents aged 12–18 revealed that parental phubbing significantly disrupted the parent-child relationship, which in turn led to higher levels of mobile phone addiction. The study found that 51.45% of the adolescents experienced frequent parental phubbing, such as during mealtimes, which contributed to feelings of neglect and rejection. These interactions were linked to heightened rates of behavioral issues, including depression and aggression, with phubbing explaining 26% of the variance in problematic mobile phone use (β = 0.26, p < 0.001).

These findings resonate with the ecological techno-subsystem theory introduced by Johnson and Puplampu, which asserts that modern technologies interfere with family systems and individual development. Parental phubbing not only disrupts immediate interactions but also contributes to broader behavioral issues, such as increased aggression and loneliness in adolescents. This underscores the importance of addressing phubbing behaviors within families. Effective interventions could focus on reducing parental screen time, reinforcing quality interactions, and fostering resilience in adolescents to counteract the detrimental effects of digital distractions on familial relationships.

== Research on phubbing and its relational effects ==
In October 2015, media outlets (such as Today and Digital Trends) reported on a study by James A. Roberts, professor of marketing at Baylor University Hankamer School of Business, that was published in the journal Computers In Human Behavior. The study consisted of two separate surveys of more than 450 U.S. adults to learn the relational effects of "phubbing" or partner phubbing. The survey found that 46.3 percent of respondents said their partners phubbed them, and 22.6 percent said it caused issues in their relationship. In an interview with Yahoo! Health, Roberts said, "We found that the ones that reported higher partner phubbing fought more with their partner and were less satisfied with their relationship than those who reported less phubbing."

== Boss phubbing ==
Boss phubbing (BPhubbing) refers to the behavior of supervisors being distracted by their smartphones during interactions with employees. This emerging workplace phenomenon has gained attention due to its negative impact on employee trust, engagement, and overall job performance. Recent research has sought to explore the underlying psychological and relational mechanisms through which BPhubbing affects workplace dynamics.

A series of studies examined the effects of BPhubbing on employee engagement, grounded in theories like Reciprocated Social Exchange (RSE) and Kahn's psychological conditions. These studies found that BPhubbing erodes trust between supervisors and employees, which is a cornerstone of healthy workplace relationships. Supervisory trust was identified as a mediator, linking BPhubbing to lower employee engagement through diminished psychological meaningfulness and availability. Employees who experienced BPhubbing were less likely to find their work valuable or believe in their ability to perform effectively, leading to decreased motivation and productivity.

Interestingly, the research by James A. Roberts and Meredith E. David revealed that psychological safety, another factor traditionally associated with engagement, did not significantly mediate the relationship between supervisory trust and engagement in the context of BPhubbing. This highlights the complex and context-dependent nature of the psychological conditions driving employee behavior. The findings suggest that reducing BPhubbing could have profound implications for organizational outcomes. Practical recommendations include implementing training programs for supervisors to increase awareness of the impact of their smartphone use, establishing clear smartphone usage policies, and fostering a corporate culture that values attentiveness and interpersonal connection.

== Phubbing in partners ==
Partner phubbing, defined as the "extent to which your romantic partner uses or is distracted by his/her cell phone while in your company", may be a social allergy that causes the affected romantic partner to respond negatively. This causes difficulties because partners feel neglected when their significant other favors phone calls over face-to-face interactions.

Studies show that 25% of married couples and 42% of unmarried couples in serious relationships report feeling distracted by their partner's phone use. This distraction can erode intimacy, trust, and overall relationship satisfaction. When one partner engages in phubbing, it indicates a lack of focus, leaving the other feeling undervalued or rejected. This dynamic is especially harmful in established partnerships, when there are higher expectations of emotional support and response. In longer relationships, partners are more interdependent, meaning that one person's behavior (like excessive phone use) is more likely to affect the other's emotional state. In contrast, shorter-term relationships may not experience these effects as strongly because the emotional investment and expectations are still developing. More recent research indicates that co-present phone use in daily relational interactions may be integrated into couple's activities, without necessary provoking any negative sentiment or feeling ignored.

The role of digital media in relationship conflicts adds another layer to the issue. Texting and social media use can trigger misunderstandings, reduce intimacy, and even serve as an escape from relationship problems. Mood management theory suggests that individuals turn to digital interactions to improve their emotional state when dealing with discomfort in their relationships. Therefore, excessive phone use may not only weaken relationship quality (the negative effect hypothesis) but also be a symptom of an already strained relationship, where partners seek relief through digital distraction.

== See also ==
- Digital media use and mental health
- Thumb tribe
