= James Dibble =

Australian television newsreader (1923–2010)

- James Dibble reading the first news bulletin on ABC TV, on 5 November 1956
- Born: James Edward Dibble; 4 February 1923; Newtown, New South Wales, Australia
- Died: 13 December 2010 (aged 87); Narrabeen, New South Wales, Australia
- Occupation: Television newsreader
- Years active: 1946–1983
- Employer: Australian Broadcasting Corporation
- Known for: Presenter of ABC News Sydney

James Edward Dibble AM MBE (4 February 1923 – 13 December 2010) was an Australian television presenter, at the Australian Broadcasting Corporation's (ABC), where he was the inaugural presenter of the news bulletin ABC News Sydney, a role he held for 27 years, from Monday, 5 November 1956 until his retirement on Friday, 10 June 1983.

== Career ==
Dibble was born in February 1923 in Newtown, New South Wales. He joined the ABC after the end of World War II. He started as a clerk in the accounts department. His voice soon attracted attention, and in Canberra he gained his first ABC job in radio doing voice-overs.

Dibble was best known as the senior newsreader for ABC-TV, beginning with the first televised news bulletin on ABN-2 Sydney on 5 November 1956. He reported the biggest news stories of the period, including the Soviet intervention in the Hungarian Revolution (in his very first bulletin; the events in Hungary caused the scheduled commencement of the ABC-TV news service to be brought forward), the assassination of John F. Kennedy (1963), the disappearance of Prime Minister Harold Holt (1967), the Apollo 11 Moon landing (1969), the destruction of Darwin by Cyclone Tracy (1974), and the dismissal of the Whitlam government (1975).

He appeared as himself in episodes of the ABC-TV comedy series Our Man In Canberra and Our Man In The Company episodes, narrated segments of the radiophonic works 'What's Rangoon To You Is Grafton To Me'(1978) and 'Hot Bananas', written by Russell Guy and originally broadcast on radio station 2JJ (Double Jay). Dibble also did voice-over work for many newsreels, documentaries and educational films.

Spanning almost 30 years, his career at the ABC ended with his retirement in 1983. His last broadcast was on 10 June of that year. However, in 1992 he returned to read the 8pm radio news from 1932 during a broadcast marking the 60th anniversary of ABC Radio.

== Personal life ==
Dibble was the son of Roland and Vera Dibble. He attended school in Marrickville at St Brigid's Primary School and then De La Salle College. He served in the Pacific with the Royal Australian Air Force during World War II as a wireless telegraphist.

Dibble never married or had children, but was described as a family-orientated man.

He served as a chairman of the Peer Support Foundation, a president of the Rotary Club of Warringah, and a member of Rotary International District 9680 Public Relations Committee.

== Awards ==
Dibble was appointed a Member of the Order of the British Empire (MBE) on 1 January 1972 for services to media, and a Member of the Order of Australia on 26 January 1989 for community and media services. He was also awarded a Centenary Medal in 2001.

He was the first winner of the Better Hearing Australia Clear Speech Award in 1967, for his clear diction. He also received Clear Speech Awards in 1968 and 1981.

== Death ==
Dibble died of cancer in Sydney on 13 December 2010, aged 87.

Media offices
Preceded by Program started	ABC News NSW presenter 1956–1983	Succeeded by Richard Morecroft
