= Le Huitième Art et la Manière =

- Directed by: Maurice Regamey
- Written by: Armand Jammot; Maurice Regamey
- Produced by: Reca Films
- Starring: Christian Alers; Louis de Funès
- Music by: Jerry Mengo
- Distributed by: Reca Films
- Release date: 9 May 1952 (France)
- Running time: short
- Country: France
- Language: French

Le Huitième Art et la Manière English: The Eighth Art and Way, is a French comedy film from 1952, directed by Maurice Regamey, written by Armand Jammot, starring Christian Alers and Louis de Funès.

== Cast ==
- Christian Alers : Un présentateur
- Luc Andrieux : Le bruiteur
- Georgette Anys : L'épouse fan de radio
- Christian Argentin : Le professeur inventeur
- Henri Bosc : Le savant MacLoyd dans le feuilleton
- André Bourillon : Le journaliste sportif
- Alain Bouvette : Un speaker
- Claude Castaing : Lui-même
- Jacques Chabannes : Lui-même
- André Claveau : Lui-même
- Georges de Caunes : Lui-même
- Louis de Funès : Le mari fan de radio
- André Cerf
- Jacqueline Dufranne
- Michel Flamme
