= Patrice Laffont =

French television presenter, actor and entertainer (1939–2024)

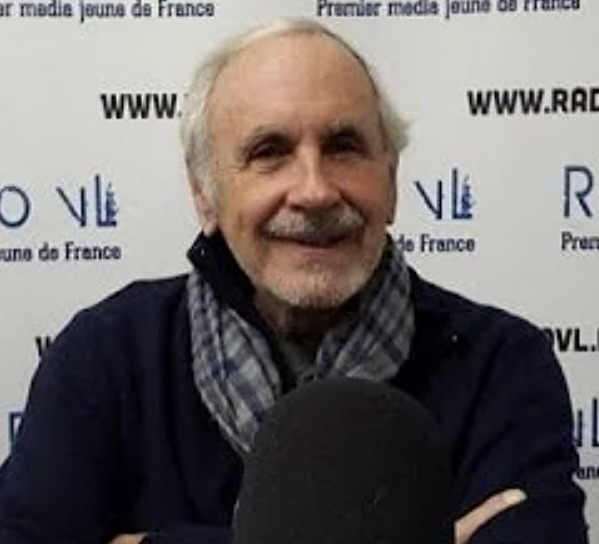
- Laffont in 2015
- Born: 21 August 1939; Marseille, France
- Died: 7 August 2024 (aged 84); Oppède, France
- Occupations: Television presenter, actor
- Years active: 1962–2024
- Children: Axelle and Mathilde Laffont

Patrice Laffont (21 August 1939 – 7 August 2024) was a French television presenter and actor.

== Life and career ==
During the 1960s Laffont had a passion for acting, where he became a star on stage and screen with his friends Michel Fugain and Michel Sardou. During the 1970s he joined Europe 1 where most of his programs were produced by Armand Jammot.

His television career includes hosting Des chiffres et des lettres (French original of the UK's Countdown) which he did between 1972 and 1989. Laffont hosted the French version of Fort Boyard from its creation in 1990 until 1999 and Pyramid between 1990 and 1997, he also hosted Les Bons Génies (French version of Match Game) and a short-lived remake of Le Juste Prix called Le Juste Euro (French versions of The Price Is Right) in 2001. Laffont hosted the 2005 edition of Intervilles and presented poker tournaments for Direct 8.

Laffont was the father of Axelle Laffont and Mathilde Laffont. He died at his home in Oppède, in Vaucluse, on 7 August 2024, at the age of 84, due to a heart attack.

France Télévisions paid tribute to him by airing the special 35th-anniversary episode of Fort Boyard, in which he was a contestant, on August 14, ahead of schedule. In September, France 3 planned a program dedicated to his career, and a special episode of Les Enfants de la télé was also scheduled.

== Filmography ==
Year	Title	Role	Notes
1962	The Suitor	Stella's Son	
1963	Les vierges	Rémi	
1964	The Troops of St. Tropez	Jean-Luc	
1965	La tête du client	Guy Tannait	
1970	Ces messieurs de la gâchette	Luigi Lombardi	
1979	The Associate	Un présentateur TV	
1982	Pour cent briques, t'as plus rien...	Un journaliste TV	Uncredited
1991	Mocky story	Un snob	
1992	La Belle Histoire	Himself	
1994	La Cité de la peur	Himself	
1996	Beaumarchais	Un douanier	
2008	Vilaine	Himself - En personne	Uncredited
2021	Bloody Oranges	Patrice	
