= Cifras y letras =

Spanish game show

Cifras y letras (lit. 'Numbers and letters') is a Spanish television game show, based on the French game show Des chiffres et des lettres. The show aired on La 2 from 1991 to 1996 with Elisenda Roca as host, and again from 2024 with Aitor Albizua presenting. From 2002 to 2013 it aired on several members of the FORTA association of television stations in the autonomous communities of Spain.

== History ==
Cifras y letras began airing on Televisión Española-owned La 2 on 18 February 1991, presented by Elisenda Roca, and ran until 1996. A Catalan language version of the show, Xifres i lletres, continued on La 2 in Catalonia from 1998 to 2000. From 2002 to 2013, the format was broadcast by publicly owned television stations in the autonomous communities of Spain, members of FORTA, namely Telemadrid, Televisión de Galicia, Canal Sur 2 and Castilla-La Mancha Televisión. On 15 January 2024, Cifras y letras returned to national broadcast on La 2, presented by Aitor Albizua.

== Format ==
Contestants face off in rounds based on numbers and letters. In the number rounds, they have 45 seconds to reach a target number by using provided numbers and the operations of addition, subtraction, multiplication and division. In the letter rounds, they request nine letters by asking for vowels or consonants, and must make a word as long as possible from them; the word must be in the Royal Spanish Academy dictionary or in the dictionary of Edicións Xerais de Galicia in the Galician version, cannot be a plural and cannot be a conjugation of a verb. A further letter challenge is to find a nine-letter word as an anagram, with a clue from an expert.

In the original run, winners earned 5,000 Pts (roughly €30) per point, and had the choice at the end of the episode to leave with the money or play the next episode; a returning contestant who lost would have their money split with their opponent. In the autonomous run, winners won €602 per win or €500 in Galicia, and returned for the next episode.

== Lawsuit ==
Antonio Elegido appeared on the series during its time on autonomous television, as an expert on words. He initiated a lawsuit against AISGE, a management organisation for actors' royalties, claiming to have appeared on the series as an actor following a script, not an expert. In March 2019, a business court in Madrid ruled in his favour. The provincial court then found in favour of AISGE's appeal in November 2020. In February 2023, Elegido's appeal to the Supreme Court of Spain was rejected.
