= The National (Australian TV series) =

Australian news and current affairs television show (1985)

The National, sometimes called ABC National, is an Australian news and current affairs program broadcast by the ABC in 1985. It was an hour long show shown on weekdays from 6:30pm.

It was first launched on 4 March 1985 and was hosted by Richard Morecroft and Geraldine Doogue. It was produced in Melbourne on Mondays and Tuesdays and in Sydney for the rest of the week. This edition was broadcast in Victoria, New South Wales, ACT and the Northern Territory. Other states had their own editions but took most of their content from the main program. The show, which had a $25 million budget, did not perform as was hoped. In August it split into two part, the first half hour being locally delivered news, the second was weather and current affairs from Sydney. It lasted until 8 December when it was replaced by a half hour news bulletin.
