= Elisenda Roca =

Spanish television presenter

- Born: Elisenda Roca Palet; 14 February 1963 (age 63); Barcelona, Spain
- Occupation: Television presenter

Elisenda Roca Palet (born 14 February 1963) is a Spanish journalist, theater director, children's book writer, university professor, and television presenter.

== Biography ==
She studied information sciences at the Autonomous University of Barcelona. She has been vice-dean of the Association of Journalists of Catalonia. She directs the audiovisual production company Paraula. She was a member of the jury for the Lletra d'Or literary award.

When she was seventeen, she began her professional career on Radio Juventud de Barcelona's Tutti Fruti program. Edited and presented the morning news program for Radiocadena Espaola with Ana Mara Bordas. She hosted Buenas tardes, Viva la gente de Barcelona, El guateque, and Los 33 de antena on Antena 3 Radio.

In 1990, she was hired by the newly created Antena 3 television, where she hosted the game Los segundos cuentan. She remained with the network until February 1991.

She thus became the first professional from a private channel to be hired by public television to present the program that would bring her the greatest popularity: the cultural quiz show Cifras y letras, on TVE, thanks to which she won the Antena de Oro, Ondas and TP de Oro awards in 1994. She remained in the space until 1996, and in 1995 she combined it with the intergenerational debate space A las diez en casa and with Telepasión española in La 1.

In 1998, she collaborated on the magazine show Les mil i una by Jordi González on TV3, in which she participated in the cinema talk show together with Jaume Figueras and Guillermina Motta. In radio, she directed and presented Les tardes amb Elisenda Roca (1999) on COM Ràdio in Barcelona for five seasons. In this afternoon's show, she recovered radio theater with original scripts and the participation of Rosa María Sardà, Sergi Belbel, Miquel García Borda, among others (Eulàlia, by Núria Furió, Rick Rovira, by Núria Furió, Somnien les ovelles científics clònics?, by David Plana, Ni cinc!, by Xevi Aranda, and Una vida més al sud, by Sergi Pompermaier). At the same radio station, she directed and presented the weekend program Dies de Ràdio (2000-2005).

She chaired and coordinated Información. Poder y ética en el siglo XXI, an international journalism meeting, directed by Manuel Campo Vidal, at the Universal Forum of Cultures in 2004.

Together with Antoni Bassas and Àngels Barceló Qui ho diría and La Marató de TV3, which were dedicated to neurodegenerative diseases, and later joined Betevé, where she was in charge of the political debate Plats pel cap, the quiz show Joc de paraules, and, from 2005 to 2009, the current affairs show La tarda.

In January 2006, she debuted as a theater director with an adaptation of Woody Allen's Misterioso asesinato en Manhattan, starring Montse Guallar, Lex Casanovas, and Pep Ferrer at the Tvoli Theater in Barcelona, extending to the Condal Theater.

She worked as a columnist in the newspaper Ara and in the magazine Descobrir Catalunya, participated in the current affairs talk show of Josep Cun's program 8 al día on 8TV, and collaborated in the radio programs El món by Jordi Basté and in La primera pedra, by Jordi Margarir, both on RAC1. She was also a television critic on Carles Mesa's program Gente despierta on RNE and collaborated in Catorze. Cultura viva, the cultural website directed by Eva Piquer, with the page Gent que val la pena.

Since 23 August 2021 she has been the voice-over of the quiz show Saber y ganar, presented by Jordi Hurtado on La 2, replacing Juanjo Cardenal. She became a professor at Pompeu Fabra University, where Emma Rodero led the master's program in audiovisual communication, and at Ramon Llull University, where Marta Casagolda and Pol Marsà led the master's program in television.

== Published books ==
- Vamos a ser padres de Grijalbo, Serem pares, Rosa dels Vents.
- Què puc menjar si estic embarassada? Rosa dels Vents.
- Qué puedo comer si estoy embarazada? Grijalbo.
- Joc de Paraules.
- Empúries.
- M’expliques un conte?.
- Fora malsons!/¡Fuera pesadillas!.
- No som els tres porquets/No somos los tres cerditos.
- Hola, gràcies, adéu/Hola, gracias, adiós.
- Això és meu/ Esto es mío.
- Pim! Pam! Pum!.
- Misteri a Moltmort.
