= RFM =

RFM may refer to:

== Radio ==
- RFM (French radio station)
- RFM (Portuguese radio station)
- RFM (Polish radio station)

== Other ==
- RFM Corporation, a Philippine food company
- RFM (customer value) (recency, frequency, monetary value), a method for analyzing customer value
- Macedonian Handball Federation (Macedonian acronym: Ракометна федерација на Македонија)
- Right-handed fast medium, a type of bowler in cricket
- RFM (chemotherapy), a chemotherapy regimen containing rituximab, fludarabine, and mitoxantrone
- Relative Fat Mass - a health measure related to Body mass index and Body fat percentage
