= Cyril Paglino =

French dancer, anchor and investor

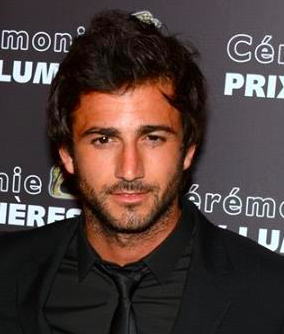
- Occupations: Entrepreneur, Investor, Dancer

Cyril Paglino (born 1986) is a French breakdancer, reality TV personality and IT entrepreneur who has founded and invested in several startup companies.

== Business career ==
Paglino founded the digital communication agency, Wizee in 2011. Later in 2013, he sold it to Change Group. He also co-founded Pleek, a picture messaging application that allows its users to communicate via images.

Paglino has invested in 30 technology startups to date. In 2015, he founded Tribe, a video messaging app, backed by investments from Sequoia Capital and KPCB.

== Entertainment career ==
Paglino worked in the breakdance band Legiteam Obstruxion and was crowned champion of France in 2006, 2007 and 2008. He won the world title in 2007. He is a former vice-world champion of breakdancing.

Paglino was a cast member on reality TV show Secret Story 2, playing alongside Alexandra.
