= Max Walsh =

Australian journalist and company director (1937–2022)

Max Walsh AM
- Born: Maximilian Sean Walsh; 8 May 1937; Paddington, New South Wales, Australia
- Died: 23 March 2022 (aged 84)
- Occupations: Enonomic and political commentator; journalist; author; broadcaster
- Years active: 1974-2007 (retirement)
- Known for: The Bulletin as Editor-in-chief; The Australian Financial Review Editor and managing director; The Carlton Walsh Report; The Walsh Report; The Sydney Morning Herald columnist and correspondent; The Age columnist and correspondent

Maximilian Sean Walsh AM (8 May 1937 – 23 March 2022) was an Australian economic and political commentator, newspaper journalist, author and broadcaster. Walsh held senior positions with two of Australia's largest publishing companies and television networks.

== Career ==
From 1974 to 1981, Walsh was editor and managing editor of The Australian Financial Review before establishing Nine Network's Sunday program. He then became co-presenter of The Carleton-Walsh Report on ABC Television, before moving to Network Ten as presenter of The Walsh Report.

From 1983 to 1998 he was a columnist and correspondent with The Sydney Morning Herald and The Age. In 1998, he became editor-in-chief of The Bulletin. He worked at The Bulletin until his retirement as the editor-at-large in June 2007.

=== Board positions ===
Walsh was deputy chairman of financial advisory firm Dixon Advisory and a member of the firm's investment committee.

Walsh was chairman of the Australian Masters Corporate Bond Fund No. 1, Australian Masters Corporate Bond Fund No. 2, Australian Masters Corporate Bond Fund No. 3, Australian Masters Corporate Bond Fund No. 4 and Australian Masters Corporate Bond Fund No. 5. He was also non-executive chairman of the Global Resource Masters Fund and the Asian Masters Fund and a director of the Australian Governance Masters Fund.

== Awards ==
In 1984, Walsh was made a member of the Order of Australia for his services to journalism.

== Author ==
Walsh is author of the book, "Poor Little Rich Country – A political History of the 1970s".

== Death ==
Walsh died on 23 March 2022 after a long struggle with dementia.
