= Lily Serna =

Australian mathematician and television presenter

- Born: 5 July 1986 (age 40); Jerusalem
- Education: University of Technology Sydney
- Occupations: Mathematician, television presenter, data analyst
- Partner: Blair Hickey
- Children: 2

Lily Serna (born 5 July 1986) is an Australian mathematician and television presenter, best known for co-presenting the SBS game shows Letters and Numbers (2010−2012) and Celebrity Letters and Numbers (2021−), as well as the cooking show Destination Flavour (2012). She works as a data analyst for Atlassian in Sydney.

== Early life and education ==
Serna was born in Jerusalem to a Palestinian family, Serna attended Cheltenham Girls High School in Sydney, New South Wales, and graduated from the University of Technology Sydney in 2009, with a Bachelor of Mathematics and Finance and a Bachelor of International Studies. She spent a year living in Bordeaux, France.

== Career ==
In August 2010, Serna began co-presenting Letters and Numbers on SBS Television while completing honours studying part-time in mathematics with applications in biology.

In August 2012, she was appointed Numeracy Ambassador for National Literacy and Numeracy Week and in September to the board of the Australian Mathematical Sciences Institute, although she is no longer a board member. She works as a data analyst for software company Atlassian. She had previously been a data analyst at Fairfax Media.

Serna was co-host, with actress and presenter Renee Lim and Adam Liaw (second-season winner of MasterChef Australia) of the SBS cooking show Destination Flavour which was first broadcast as a 10-part series in late 2012.

Serna appeared in an episode on risk for the ABC's Catalyst television program which aired in 2019.

She is again a co-presenter in a celebrity version of Letters and Numbers which commenced transmission on SBS on Saturday 2 October 2021.

== Personal life ==
Serna became engaged to Blair Hickey at Surprise Bay during a hike in Tasmania early in 2019. They have a child born in late 2019.

== Publications ==
- Serna, L. 2012. Lily's Number Puzzles. Hardie Grant. ISBN 1742704018
- Serna, L. 2019. Curious: life hacks through maths. Pan Macmillan. ISBN 9781760781156
