= Armand Jammot =

French television producer (1922–1988)

- Born: 4 April 1922; Alfortville, France
- Died: 19 April 1998 (aged 76); Châtenay-Malabry, France
- Occupation: Television producer

Armand Jammot (4 April 1922 – 19 April 1998) was a French television producer. He produced a number of shows, most notably Les Dossiers de l'Écran, and in 1965, he created Des chiffres et des lettres.

In 1982, Yorkshire Television was given permission to produce Countdown, a British version of Des chiffres et des lettres. This show continues to the present day.

== See also ==
- Le Huitième Art et la Manière (1952)
