= Bracewell =

Bracewell may refer to:

== People ==
- Brendon Bracewell (born 1959), New Zealand cricketer, brother of John and Douglas
- Doug Bracewell (born 1990), New Zealand cricketer, son of Brendon
- Douglas Bracewell (born 1953), New Zealand cricketer, brother of John and Brendon
- John Bracewell (born 1958), New Zealand cricketer and coach, brother of Brendon and Douglas
- Joyanne Bracewell (1934–2007), British High Court judge
- Mark Bracewell (born 1955), New Zealand cricketer, father of Michael
- Melanie Bracewell (born 1995), New Zealand comedian
- Michael Bracewell (cricketer) (born 1991), New Zealand cricketer, son of Mark
- Michael Bracewell (writer) (born 1958), British writer and novelist
- Nina Bracewell-Smith (born 1955), born Nina Kakkar, Indian-British non-executive director of Arsenal F.C.
- Paul Bracewell (born 1962), England international footballer
- Richard Bracewell (born 1969), English film director
- Ronald N. Bracewell (1921–2007), Australian professor of electrical engineering at Stanford University
- J. Searcy Bracewell Jr. (1918–2003), Texan politician, founder of the law firm Bracewell LLP

== Places ==
- Bracewell, Lancashire, England
- Bracewell, Queensland, a locality in the Gladstone Region, Australia

== Other uses ==
- Bracewell LLP, international law firm based in Houston, Texas
