= Dutch cricket team in New Zealand in 2021–22 =

International cricket tour

	New Zealand	Netherlands
- Dates: 25 March – 4 April 2022
Captains	Tom Latham	Pieter Seelaar

One Day International series
- Results: New Zealand won the 3-match series 3–0
Most runs	Will Young (224)	Michael Rippon (109)
Most wickets	Kyle Jamieson (6)	Logan van Beek (7)
- Player of the series: Will Young (NZ)

Twenty20 International series
- Results: 1-match series drawn 0–0

The Netherlands cricket team toured New Zealand in March and April 2022 to play one Twenty20 International (T20I) and three One Day International (ODI) matches. The ODI series formed part of the inaugural 2020–2023 ICC Cricket World Cup Super League. Originally scheduled to take place in January or February 2022, the tour was moved back slightly due to COVID-19 quarantine requirements for travelling to New Zealand. In November 2021, New Zealand Cricket confirmed the full dates of the tour.

The initial tour schedule had the first ODI at the University Oval, Dunedin. However, on 27 January 2022, New Zealand Cricket announced a change to the itinerary, with the match being moved to Bay Oval. Prior to the international matches, three warm-up games between the New Zealand XI team and the Netherlands were also played. The New Zealand XI team won both of the 50-over matches, with the third match, a 20-over encounter, abandoned without a ball being bowled due to rain.

The one-off T20I would have been the first time that the Dutch team played a T20I in New Zealand, and the ODIs were the first time the teams had played each other in that format since the 1996 Cricket World Cup. However, the T20I match was abandoned without a ball being bowled due to rain. The hosts won all three ODIs by comfortable margins. New Zealand won the opening ODI match by seven wickets, with Will Young scoring his first century in the format. New Zealand won the second ODI by 118 runs, with Tom Latham scoring his highest total in ODI cricket with an unbeaten 140 runs. New Zealand won the third and final match by 115 runs, with another century from Will Young, to take the series 3–0.

The series also marked the international retirement of Ross Taylor, who played in his 450th and final match for New Zealand.

== Squads ==
ODIs		T20I	
New Zealand	Netherlands	New Zealand	Netherlands
Tom Latham (c, wk); Doug Bracewell; Michael Bracewell; ~~Mark Chapman~~; Colin de Grandhomme; Martin Guptill; Matt Henry; Kyle Jamieson; Henry Nicholls; Ish Sodhi; Ross Taylor; Blair Tickner; George Worker; Will Young	Pieter Seelaar (c); Shariz Ahmad; Philippe Boissevain; Bas de Leede; Aryan Dutt; Scott Edwards; Clayton Floyd; Brandon Glover; Boris Gorlee; Fred Klaassen; Ryan Klein; Stephan Myburgh; Max O'Dowd; Michael Rippon; Vikramjit Singh; Logan van Beek	Tom Latham (c, wk); Doug Bracewell; Michael Bracewell; Mark Chapman; Dane Cleaver (wk); Colin de Grandhomme; Martin Guptill; Matt Henry; Scott Kuggeleijn; Ben Sears; Ish Sodhi; Blair Tickner; Will Young	Pieter Seelaar (c); Shariz Ahmad; Philippe Boissevain; Bas de Leede; Aryan Dutt; Scott Edwards; Clayton Floyd; Brandon Glover; Boris Gorlee; Fred Klaassen; Ryan Klein; Stephan Myburgh; Max O'Dowd; Michael Rippon; Vikramjit Singh; Logan van Beek

On 13 March 2022, Michael Rippon was added to the Dutch squad for the tour. Ahead of the ODI series, New Zealand's Mark Chapman tested positive for COVID-19, with George Worker named as his replacement.

== Warm-up matches ==
17 March 2022
11:00
Scorecard

New Zealand XI; 280/8 (50 overs)	v	Netherlands; 117/4 (29.1 overs)
Michael Bracewell 127* (108); Fred Klaassen 3/54 (10 overs)		Bas de Leede 47* (56); Michael Bracewell 2/14 (5.1 overs)

New Zealand XI won by 42 runs (DLS method)
McLean Park, Napier
Umpires: Chris Brown (NZ) and Chris Gaffaney (NZ)

- Netherlands won the toss and elected to field.
- Netherlands were set a revised target of 160 runs from 29.1 overs due to rain.

19 March 2022
14:00 (D/N)
Scorecard

Netherlands; 214/9 (50 overs)	v	New Zealand XI; 215/6 (42.1 overs)
Bas de Leede 74 (91); Angus McKenzie 4/33 (9 overs)		Michael Bracewell 81 (72); Ryan Klein 2/30 (5 overs)

New Zealand XI won by 4 wickets
McLean Park, Napier
Umpires: Chris Brown (NZ) and Wayne Knights (NZ)

- Toss uncontested.

21 March 2022
19:00 (N)
Scorecard

New Zealand XI	v	Netherlands

Match abandoned
McLean Park, Napier
Umpires: Chris Gaffaney (NZ) and Wayne Knights (NZ)

- No toss.
- No play was possible due to rain.

== Only T20I ==
25 March 2022
19:10 (N)
Scorecard

New Zealand	v	Netherlands

Match abandoned
McLean Park, Napier
Umpires: Chris Brown (NZ) and Shaun Haig (NZ)

- No toss.
- No play was possible due to rain.

== ODI series ==
=== 1st ODI ===
29 March 2022
14:00 (D/N)
Scorecard

Netherlands; 202 (49.4 overs)	v	New Zealand; 204/3 (38.3 overs)
Michael Rippon 67 (97); Blair Tickner 4/50 (10 overs)		Will Young 103* (114); Michael Rippon 2/32 (8 overs)

New Zealand won by 7 wickets
Bay Oval, Tauranga
Umpires: Chris Gaffaney (NZ) and Wayne Knights (NZ)
Player of the match: Will Young (NZ)

- Netherlands won the toss and elected to bat.
- Michael Bracewell, Blair Tickner (NZ) and Vikramjit Singh (Ned) all made their ODI debuts.
- Will Young (NZ) scored his first century in ODIs.
- World Cup Super League points: New Zealand 10, Netherlands 0.

=== 2nd ODI ===
2 April 2022
14:00 (D/N)
Scorecard

New Zealand; 264/9 (50 overs)	v	Netherlands; 146 (34.1 overs)
Tom Latham 140* (123); Logan van Beek 4/56 (10 overs)		Bas de Leede 37 (58); Michael Bracewell 3/21 (5 overs)

New Zealand won by 118 runs
Seddon Park, Hamilton
Umpires: Chris Brown (NZ) and Chris Gaffaney (NZ)
Player of the match: Tom Latham (NZ)

- Netherlands won the toss and elected to field.
- World Cup Super League points: New Zealand 10, Netherlands 0.

=== 3rd ODI ===
4 April 2022
14:00 (D/N)
Scorecard

New Zealand; 333/8 (50 overs)	v	Netherlands; 218 (42.3 over)
Will Young 120 (112); Clayton Floyd 2/41 (7 overs)		Stephan Myburgh 64 (43); Matt Henry 4/36 (7.3 overs)

New Zealand won by 115 runs
Seddon Park, Hamilton
Umpires: Chris Gaffaney (NZ) and Shaun Haig (NZ)
Player of the match: Will Young (NZ)

- New Zealand won the toss and elected to bat.
- Martin Guptill (NZ) scored his 7,000th run in ODIs.
- Matt Henry (NZ) took his 100th wicket in ODIs.
- World Cup Super League points: New Zealand 10, Netherlands 0.
