= Big Brother (Australian TV series) season 16 =

Australian reality television season

Big Brother
- Season 16
- Presented by: Mel Tracina
- No. of days: 30
- No. of housemates: 13
- Winner: Coco Beeby
- Runner-up: Emily Dale
- No. of episodes: 26

Release
- Original network: Network 10
- Original release: 9 November – 8 December 2025

Additional information
- Filming dates: 8 November – 8 December 2025

Series chronology
- ← Previous; Season 15 Next → Season 17

The sixteenth season of the Australian reality television series Big Brother, also known as Big Brother 2025, marked the return of the program to original broadcaster Network 10 after the network concluded production of the show following its eighth season in 2008.

The season introduced Mel Tracina as host, and featured the return of narrator Mike Goldman. Production of the series returned to the original location at Dreamworld for the first time since the eleventh season in 2014. It premiered on 9 November 2025 and concluded on 8 December 2025, making it the shortest regular season on Channel 10 to date. The winner of the season was Coco Beeby, who won a total of A$135,000.

== Format ==
Like other seasons of the show, the series revolves around a group of strangers living in a house together with no communication with the outside world. Referred to as "housemates", the group is constantly filmed during their time in the house and are not permitted to communicate with those filming them, except with the titular "Big Brother" – an embodiment of the show's producers.

Unlike seasons 12 to 15, which aired on Seven Network, this season featured the original format, which emphasised the show as a social experiment and did not emphasise competitive aspects. Every week, the housemates vote who they wish to leave the house, with those receiving the most votes being nominated for eviction. The Australian public votes to save their favourite nominee with the housemate receiving the least save votes being evicted during a live show. This process continued until only one housemate remains to win the grand prize. Additionally, the show returned to being filmed live, as opposed to being pre-recorded, as was the case when the show was on the Seven Network.

== Production ==
On 16 September 2024, it was confirmed that Big Brother would be returning to its original broadcaster Network 10, which aired the show from its inception in 2001 until 2008, for its sixteenth season in 2025, after reacquiring the rights to the show following its cancellation on Nine Network and Seven Network in 2014 and 2023 respectively. Comedian, Nova radio host and The Cheap Seats showbiz correspondent Mel Tracina was announced as the new host, taking over from Sonia Kruger. Mike Goldman returned to the program as narrator, having previously narrated seasons 1-11 on 10 and Nine. The promo advertising the return noted the series' return to its original format with 24-hour live streaming (which would be hosted on 10's online streaming service, as a Pluto TV channel hosted on the app), live nominations and evictions and prominently featured footage from the original Network 10 iteration of the series. On 27 July 2025, it was confirmed that the new house will return to Dreamworld and be constructed inside of the Exhibition Centre, with the announcement also coinciding with the opening of the casting call for the new series.

An updated promo for the series, featuring Mel Tracina and advertising a November airdate aired during the finale of Australian Survivor: Australia V The World in September. A second promo began airing in early October, featuring "Bad Guy" by Billie Eilish and announcing the 9 November launch date. The launch show was recorded the day before premiering on 8 November. Due to weather conditions, filming was paused during the recording after several housemates had already entered, however was completed later that day. Gold Coast-based voice artist Pete Cunningham (who had served as the co-deputy Big Brother in 2012 and 2013 seasons) provided the voice of Big Brother after Leon Murray (who had served as the deputy Big Brother in the 2008 and 2012–2014 seasons) was replaced at the last minute.

On 8 December 2025, Tracina teased during the season finale that the series will return for a 17th season in 2026.

== Housemates ==
The 12 original housemates were revealed and entered on the Launch Night.

Name	Age on entry	Residence	Occupation	Day entered	Day exited	Result
Coco Beeby	30	Scotts Head, New South Wales	Early education	0	30	Winner
Emily Dale	30	Perth, Western Australia	Primary school teacher	0	30	Runner-up
Colin Ridley	21	Wollongong, New South Wales	Aspiring MMA fighter	0	30	3rd place
Bruce Dunne	25	Sunshine Coast, Queensland	Tradesman	0	30	4th place
Allana Jackson	45	Gold Coast, Queensland	Social worker	0	30	Bribed (Note: Allana accepted a bribe of a new Suzuki Jimny XL, valued at $43,000 on Finale Night. However, by accepting the offer, she had to forfeit her opportunity to win the grand prize.)
Conor Maysey	31	Gold Coast, Queensland (originally from United Kingdom)	Disability advocate	0	29	Evicted
Edward Doak	30	Adelaide, South Australia	Sales manager	0	27	Evicted
Vincent "Vinnie" Brigante	21	Melbourne, Victoria	Barber	0	24	Evicted
Holly Young	31	Perth, Western Australia	Model	0	22	Evicted
Abiola Sanusi	24	Melbourne, Victoria	Singer and musician	0	20	Bribed (Note: Abiola accepted a bribe of $15,000. However, by accepting the offer, she had to leave the game immediately as a result.)
Mia Wijewardene	23	Melbourne, Victoria	Hardware shop assistant	0	15	Evicted
Jane Marshall-Doherty	67	Melbourne, Victoria	Retired	2 (Note: Jane was voted into the house by Australia.)	15	Evicted
Michael Downs	49	Sydney, New South Wales	Publisher	0	8	Evicted

=== Former potential housemates ===
On Launch Night, a vote opened for two potential housemates, 67-year-old Jane Marshall-Doherty and 36-year-old Mitchell "Mitch" Miletic, who faced Australia's vote to become the 13th housemate.

Name	Age	Occupation	Residence
Mitchell "Mitch" Miletic	36	Dealer	Melbourne, Victoria

== Twists ==
=== Prize money ===
This season, the prize money started at $100,000. However, housemates can add money to (or remove money from) the prize pool by successfully completing various tasks and dilemmas, similar to the format in season 7.

	Event	Offered	+/-	Running total	Possible Prize
Week 1	Initial amount	$100,000	—N/a	$100,000	$100,000
Week 1	Ranking shopping task	$60,000	+$25,000	$125,000	$160,000
Week 2	Temptation phone call	$25,000	$0	$125,000	$185,000
Week 3	Christmas bribe	-$15,000	–$15,000	$110,000	$185,000
Week 4	Stack or steal	$25,000	+$25,000	$135,000	$210,000

=== Head Housemate ===
After each eviction, the evicted housemate could appoint a housemate as the "Head Housemate". The Head Housemate would be able to allocate household chores for each housemate, sleep in the queen bed in the bedroom, receive personal luxuries, and control the weekly shop for the house.

They would also be immune from eviction and have the power to save a housemate from eviction, with the next highest voted housemate or housemates being nominated in their place.

Following Vinnie's eviction, this position was abolished.

	Appointed By	Appointed Head Housemate
Week 2	Michael	Holly
Week 3	Jane (Note: Mia was evicted on the same night as Jane; she was given the alternate post-eviction power of voting in Week 3's Nominations.)	Allana
Week 4	Holly	Colin

== Weekly summary ==
The main events of the sixteenth season are summarised in the table below.

Week 1	Entrances	During the Launch, Colin, Allana, Coco, Conor, Abiola, Vinnie, Emily, Bruce, Holly, Edward, Mia and Michael entered the house.; On Day 2, Jane entered the house after being voted by Australia to be the 13th housemate.
Week 1	Tasks	During the Launch, housemates brought their suitcases with them, but were instructed to leave them outside prior to entering. Unbeknownst to them, the contents of their luggage were confiscated and placed in the "BB Bargain Basement." Throughout the course of the week, housemates gained the opportunity to "purchase" their personal belongings from the store.; On Days 1 and 2, housemates participated in their first shopping task, where they ranked themselves from most to least in six different categories, trying to match who the public voted as the "most" and "least" in that category. Each correct answer earned $50 to the shopping budget and $5,000 to the overall prize fund. They got 5 out of 12 answers correct, earning $250 for the shopping budget and $25,000 to the prize money.; On Day 1, as a result of being voted as the most deserving of a new wardrobe in the shopping task, Emily was granted access to "shop" in the "BB Bargain Basement" for 30 seconds, however, she could only pick other housemates' personal belongings. On the same day, Colin was also granted access to the "BB Bargain Basement" for 30 seconds as a consolation prize from the shopping task. He was also given clean underwear and fresh dental kits for the entire house.; On Day 2, housemates were given a chance to "buy" two items each from the "BB Bargain Basement".; On Day 4, housemates, except for Jane, were given a last chance to get their belongings back by begging for them at "BB's Bargain Bin".; On Day 5, Abiola and Emily were given a secret task to setup a secret party in the party room by gathering items around the house. They succeeded the task and thus earned the house with an "unforgettable" party.
Week 1	Twists	On Day 2, upon entering the house, Jane was given a secret mission to hide from the original housemates for 90 seconds in one of Big Brother's hiding spots. If she successfully hid from the housemates, she would receive immunity from the first eviction. If she was caught before time was up, she would be automatically nominated for the first eviction. She failed the task after being caught by Conor with only five seconds left, making her nominated for the first eviction.
Week 1	Nominations	On Day 4, housemates nominated for the first time. Holly and Michael received the most points (21 and 13 points respectively) and thus, faced the public vote this week alongside Jane.
Week 1	Exits	On Day 8, Michael became the first housemate to be evicted, after receiving the fewest votes to save.
Week 2	Twists	On Day 8, following his eviction, Michael named Holly as the first Head Housemate.; On Day 9, as part of the "BB Eatz" task, a phone was installed in the house. This phone was also used for various other mini-tasks and dilemmas during the rest of the week.; On Day 13, as the result of answering the phone, Vinnie was asked to either receive $10,000 for himself or add $25,000 to the prize money. He chose to receive $10,000 for himself, and must justify the reasons for his choice immediately to the other housemates.
Week 2	Nominations	On Day 9, housemates nominated for the second time. Jane, Mia, and Allana received the most points (14, 13, and 10 points respectively) and are nominated for eviction this week. As Head Housemate, Holly decided not to use her power to save a nominee, therefore leaving the nominations intact for this week.
Week 2	Tasks	On Days 9 and 10, housemates participated in their second shopping task of "BB Eatz", where housemates had to run a takeaway shop and deliver food to the diary room. They will be given a star rating for each order they completed. They must reach an average star rating of 4 to pass the task. Housemates failed the task after receiving an average of 2 stars, therefore, receiving only the basic shopping budget of $120 for the week.; On Day 11, housemates got a phone call from "BB FM", where they participated in the "Housemate Hot Seat" game. In the game, each housemate were given 5 seconds to answer a question, related to their time in the house and themselves. Each correct answer would award them $20 for the luxury shop. They answered 5 out of 12 questions correct, and thus earned $100 for the luxury shop.; On Day 12, housemates were given a VIP party. However, Holly had to choose 4 people to serve as staff members of the party, rather than attend it. She chose Conor and Vinnie as bathroom attendants and Edward and Mia to be security.
Week 2	Punishments	On Day 11, as the result of answering the phone, Edward had to be chained to Jane, who was voted by the public, until further notice.
Week 2	Exits	On Day 15, Jane became the second housemate to be evicted, after receiving the fewest votes to save.; On Day 15, Mia became the third housemate to be evicted, after a phone call to save Allana from a fan. (Bec from Queensland)
Week 3	Twists	On Day 15, following Jane's eviction, she named Allana as the second Head Housemate.; On Day 15, following Mia's eviction, she was given a power to nominate like everyone else. Unlike usual nominations, these were revealed publicly to the housemates.; On Day 20, housemates who are not nominated are offered $15,000 for one of them, taken from the prize pool. They must also leave the house immediately if they accept the offer. Abiola accepted the offer.
Week 3	Nominations	On Day 16, housemates nominated for the third time. Combining with Mia's nominations, Abiola, Bruce, and Vinnie received the most points (12, 9, and 9 points respectively) and are nominated for eviction this week. As Head Housemate, Allana decided to use her power to save Abiola and putting Conor and Holly (who both received 8 points) up for eviction this week alongside the initial nominees.
Week 3	Tasks	On Days 16-18, housemates participated in their third shopping task of "The Grand BB Hotel". The four housemates who were assigned chores this week (Bruce, Coco, Edward, and Holly) were assigned to be staff members of the hotel. The rest of the housemates were guests of the hotel. To pass the task, the guests must receive a five-star luxury experience from the staff members, while being "guests from hell", without being detected in doing so. They passed the task and thus received a luxury shopping budget of $500 for the week.; On Day 19, Emily was given a secret task to convince housemates that a series of movie plots are real-life experiences from her past. She successfully passed the task and earned the housemates some ice cream.
Week 3	Exits	On Day 20, Abiola left the house, after accepting the walkout offer from Big Brother.; On Day 22, Holly became the fourth housemate to be evicted, after receiving the fewest votes to save.
Week 4	Twists	On Day 22, following her eviction, Holly named Colin as the third and final Head Housemate.; On Day 22, Edward received a gift that gave him ten nomination points to be spread amongst two housemates of his choosing in the next round of nominations. With this, his nominations were made live instead of in the morning of Day 23, and was shown to the rest of the housemates.; On Day 24, a snap eviction was conducted in the early mornings of the day. After nominations, the voting was only opened until 1am AEDT on Day 24. After the votes were closed, Vinnie was evicted, during the carol shopping task.; On Day 27, another snap eviction was conducted during letters from home, where Edward was evicted. Despite this, the voting was still opened until Day 29 for the remaining nominees, including Edward.; On Day 27, each housemate was given an option to either "steal" $25,000, or "stack" $25,000 to the prize pool. If no housemate decided to "steal", $25,000 will be added to the prize pool. If one (or two) housemate decided to "steal", they will share $25,000 amongst themselves. If three or more housemate decided to "steal", the money is forfeited and no housemates will get them. Every housemate decided to "stack", thus earning themselves $25,000 for the prize pool.
Week 4	Nominations	On Day 23, housemates nominated for the fourth time. Vinnie, Coco, and Allana received the most points (16, 10, and 7 points respectively) and are nominated for eviction this week. As Head Housemate, Colin decided to use his power to save Allana and putting Emily (who received 5 points) up for eviction alongside the initial nominees.; On Day 25, housemates nominated for the fifth time. Colin, Coco, Edward, and Conor received the most points (10, 8, 5, and 4 respectively) and thus, faced the public vote.
Week 4	Tasks	On Days 23 and 24, housemates participated in their fourth and final shopping task, where they must get on stage and sing a carol every time the bells rang, within 30 seconds. To pass the task, housemates must recite the carol correctly as well as being on time and dressed properly for the carol. They failed the task and only received $50 for the shopping budget.; On Day 25, housemates were given an advent calendar task, where each housemate must complete an individual challenge in the diary room according to their chosen challenge. Each successful challenge will award the house $50 for the luxury shop. They passed 5 out of 7 challenges, thus earning themselves $250 for the luxury shop.; On Day 26, Bruce and Colin were given a secret task to bring designated stuff from the house to the diary room without any other housemates knowing. They successfully passed the task and thus earned the house a KFC meal.; On Day 26, housemates were given a task to identify which housemate relates to which comment submitted by the public. They successfully passed the task after identifying most of the comments correctly, and earned themselves a "True Blue Aussie Backyard Christmas" party.
Week 4	Exits	On Day 24, Vinnie became the fifth housemate to be evicted in the early hours of the morning, after receiving the fewest votes to save.; On Day 27, Edward became the sixth housemate to be evicted during the reading of letters from home, after receiving the fewest votes to save.; On Day 29, Conor became the seventh housemate to be evicted, after receiving the fewest votes to save.
Week 5	Twists	On Day 30, Mel Tracina offered the finalists a walkout offer of a new Suzuki Jimny XL car (valued at $43,000). However, accepting (and winning) this offer would make the housemate lose their chance to win Big Brother. If two or more housemates chose to accept the offer, the offer will be delivered by a game of chance between those housemates. Allana and Bruce accepted the offer. After the game of chance, Allana ultimately won the car.
Week 5	Exits	On Day 30, Allana left the house, after accepting the walkout offer by Big Brother.; On Day 30, Bruce finished in fourth place whilst Colin finished in third. Coco was then announced as the winner, leaving Emily as the runner-up

== Episodes ==
No. overall	No. in season	Title	Day(s)	Original release date	Australian viewers
Week 1
1642	1	Launch / Daily Show 1	Day 0	9 November 2025	770,000
1643	2	Live (The 13th Housemate)	Day 1	10 November 2025	630,000
1644	3	Daily Show 2	Day 2	11 November 2025	630,000
1645	4	Live Nominations 1	Days 3–4	12 November 2025	590,000
1646	5	Daily Show 3	Day 4	13 November 2025	520,000
1647	6	Daily Show 4	Day 5	14 November 2025	420,000
1648	7	Live Eviction 1	Days 6 and 8	16 November 2025	650,000
Week 2
1649	8	Live Nominations 2	Days 8–9	17 November 2025	620,000
1650	9	Daily Show 5	Days 9–10	18 November 2025	610,000
1651	10	Daily Show 6	Day 10	19 November 2025	540,000
1652	11	Daily Show 7	Day 11	20 November 2025	510,000
1653	12	Daily Show 8	Day 12	21 November 2025	410,000
1654	13	Live Eviction 2	Days 13 and 15	23 November 2025	670,000
Week 3
1655	14	Live Nominations 3	Days 15–16	24 November 2025	640,000
1656	15	Daily Show 9	Day 16	25 November 2025	580,000
1657	16	Daily Show 10	Day 17	26 November 2025	640,000
1658	17	Daily Show 11	Day 18	27 November 2025	560,000
1659	18	Daily Show 12	Day 19	28 November 2025	440,000
1660	19	Live Eviction 3	Days 20 and 22	30 November 2025	670,000
Week 4
1661	20	Live Nominations 4	Days 22–23	1 December 2025	610,000
1662	21	Daily Show 13 (Snap Eviction)	Days 23–24	2 December 2025	600,000
1663	22	Live Nominations 5	Day 24	3 December 2025	580,000
1664	23	Daily Show 14	Day 25	4 December 2025	490,000
1665	24	Daily Show 15	Day 26	5 December 2025	400,000
1666	25	Live Eviction 4	Days 27 and 29	7 December 2025	590,000
Week 5
1667	26	Live Finale	Days 29–30	8 December 2025	690,000

== Nominations table ==
This season, similar to seasons 9 to 11, housemates vote by allocating five nomination points between Housemates, with a maximum of four points to be allocated to any one housemate. The Head Housemate (appointed by the most recent evictee) had immunity from nomination. The three or more housemates with the most points face the public vote. After voting, the Head Housemate had the option to save one of the original nominees with the next highest vote recipient becoming a nominee.

Colour key:

Winner
Runner-up
Finalist
Head Housemate
Nominated
Evicted
Bribed

	Week 1	Week 2	Week 3	Week 4		Finale		Nomination points received
	Week 1	Week 2	Week 3	Day 23	Day 25	Finale		Nomination points received
Head Housemate	none	Holly	Allana	Colin	none			Nomination points received
Coco	4–Michael; 1–Bruce	3–Mia; 2–Jane	3–Holly; 2–Conor	3–Edward; 2–Vinnie	3–Edward; 2–Conor	Winner (Day 30)		24
Emily	3–Holly; 2–Vinnie	3–Colin; 2–Abiola	3–Vinnie; 2–Abiola	3–Vinnie; 2–Bruce	3–Colin; 2–Coco	Runner-up (Day 30)		10
Colin	2–Mia; 3–Michael	4–Jane; 1–Allana	4–Vinnie; 1–Abiola	4–Coco; 1–Vinnie	3–Coco; 2–Conor	Third place (Day 30)		27
Bruce	4–Mia; 1–Coco	4–Jane; 1–Mia	3–Conor; 2–Abiola	3–Allana; 2–Emily	3–Emily; 2–Allana	Fourth place (Day 30)		22
Allana	4–Michael; 1–Holly	3–Mia; 2–Edward	3–Bruce; 2–Holly	3–Vinnie; 2–Conor	3–Bruce; 2–Edward	Bribed (Day 30)		19
Conor	4–Holly; 1–Michael	3–Mia; 2–Allana	3–Bruce; 2–Vinnie	3–Emily; 2–Coco	4–Colin; 1–Coco	Evicted (Day 29)		14
Edward	1–Holly; 4–Abiola	3–Abiola; 2–Colin	3–Coco; 2–Vinnie	7–Vinnie; 3–Coco	3–Colin; 2–Coco	Evicted (Day 27)		11
Vinnie	2–Mia; 3–Holly	3–Allana; 2–Jane	3–Conor; 2–Emily	4–Allana; 1–Coco	Evicted (Day 24)			30
Holly	4–Mia; 1–Michael	4–Allana; 1–Edward	4–Abiola; 1–Vinnie	Evicted (Day 22)				29
Abiola	3–Colin; 2–Holly	3–Mia; 2–Jane	4–Colin; 1–Bruce	Bribed (Day 20)				22
Mia	4–Holly; 1–Bruce	4–Bruce; 1–Abiola	3–Holly; 2–Bruce	Evicted (Day 15)				25
Jane	3–Holly; 2–Coco	3–Colin; 2–Bruce	Evicted (Day 15)					14
Michael	3–Abiola; 2–Colin	Evicted (Day 8)						13
Notes	1	2	3, 4	5, 6	7, 8	9, 10		
Nominated (pre-save)	none	Allana, Jane, Mia	Abiola, Bruce, Vinnie	Allana, Coco, Vinnie	none			
Saved	none	none	Abiola	Allana	none			
Against public vote	Holly, Jane, Michael	Allana, Jane, Mia	Bruce, Conor, Holly, Vinnie	Coco, Emily, Vinnie	Coco, Colin, Conor, Edward	~~Allana,~~; Bruce, Coco, Colin, Emily		
Evicted	Michael; Fewest votes to save	Jane; Fewest votes to save	Abiola; Bribed ($15,000)	Vinnie; Fewest votes to save	Edward; Fewest votes to save	Allana; Bribed (Car)	Colin; Fewest votes (out of 3)	
Evicted	Michael; Fewest votes to save	Jane; Fewest votes to save	Abiola; Bribed ($15,000)	Vinnie; Fewest votes to save	Edward; Fewest votes to save	Bruce; Fewest votes (out of 4)	Emily; Fewest votes (out of 2)	
Evicted	Michael; Fewest votes to save	Mia; Fan’s choice to evict	Holly; Fewest votes to save	Vinnie; Fewest votes to save	Conor; Fewest votes to save	Coco; Most votes to win		

=== Notes ===
- ^Note 1: Australia voted Jane into the house on Day 2. She was given a mission to sneak into the house and hide. The Housemates then had 90 seconds to find her. The reward for remaining hidden was immunity. However, as she was found, she failed her task and was nominated for eviction. As a result of Jane’s nomination, only two or more housemates with the most points would be nominated.
- ^Note 2: Week 2 was a Double Eviction. Following Jane's eviction by Australia's Vote, the Big Brother phone rang with one randomly chosen viewer determining the next evictee by saving one of the remaining nominees (Allana or Mia), leaving the other evicted.
- ^Note 3: As Jane appointed the next Head Housemate, Mia was given the power to vote in Week 3's Nominations following her eviction. Her votes were broadcast to the house in a goodbye message.
- ^Note 4: On Day 20, Big Brother offered a bribe to the Housemates not nominated in Week 3's Eviction to leave the house with $15,000, which would be taken from the Prize Fund. Abiola accepted the bribe.
- ^Note 5: As a result of receiving a Christmas gift, Edward could vote with 10 nomination points to nominate two housemates. His votes were broadcast to the rest of the Housemates.
- ^Note 6: On Day 23, voting took place for approximately 4 hours after Week 4's Live Nominations, resulting in an Instant Eviction in the early morning of Day 24 after the Housemates were woken up for the carolling task.
- ^Note 7: For this round of nominations, the four or more housemates with the most points would be nominated.
- ^Note 8: On Day 27, an Instant Eviction occurred when Big Brother gave everyone their letters from home. Edward was evicted from the house after receiving the fewest votes to save from Australia. Voting remained open for the remaining nominees for a second Eviction on Day 29. As Edward’s Eviction was only revealed on Episode 26 (which aired on Day 29), the option to vote for Edward on the website remained open; however, any votes cast would not count.
- ^Note 9: On Day 29, voting opened for Australia to vote for the winner of Big Brother Australia 2025 and the $135,000 prize between the 5 Finalists.
- ^Note 10: During the Finale, Mel offered the Finalist a bribe of a new Suzuki Jimny XL (valued at $43,000) if they chose to forfeit their opportunity to win the grand prize. Bruce and Allanna accepted the offer and participated in a game of chance to decide the car's winner. Allanna won the game and the car and left the house.

== Ratings ==
Ratings are rounded to the nearest ten thousand. Viewership data is from OzTAM and represents the consolidated National average viewership within a week after broadcast.

	Viewers (millions) National				
	Week 1	Week 2	Week 3	Week 4	Week 5
Sunday	1.12	0.87	0.87	0.86	0.73
Monday	0.97	0.89	0.84	0.81	0.80
Tuesday	0.93	0.90	0.81	0.81	
Wednesday	0.92	0.82	0.87	0.79	
Thursday	0.83	0.80	0.82	0.70	
Friday	0.73	0.73	0.73	0.67	
Weekly average	0.92	0.83	0.82	0.77	0.77
Running average	0.92	0.87	0.86	0.84	0.82
Season average	0.82				
blue-coloured boxes denote live shows.
