= Dutch cricket team against Afghanistan in Qatar in 2021–22 =

International cricket tour

	Afghanistan	Netherlands
- Dates: 21 – 25 January 2022
Captains	Hashmatullah Shahidi	Pieter Seelaar

One Day International series
- Results: Afghanistan won the 3-match series 3–0
Most runs	Hashmatullah Shahidi (155)	Scott Edwards (208)
Most wickets	Mujeeb Ur Rahman (7)	Fred Klaassen (4); Brandon Glover (4)
- Player of the series: Scott Edwards (Ned)

The Netherlands cricket team toured Qatar in January 2022 to play three One Day International (ODI) matches against Afghanistan. The ODI series formed part of the inaugural 2020–2023 ICC Cricket World Cup Super League. All three matches were played at the West End Park International Cricket Stadium in Doha. Hashmatullah Shahidi was named Afghanistan's ODI captain, replacing Asghar Afghan.

Afghanistan won the first ODI by 36 runs. With a century from Rahmanullah Gurbaz, Afghanistan won the second ODI by 48 runs to win the series with a match to play. In the third and final ODI, Afghanistan won by 75 runs, to take the series 3–0.

Following the series, Dutch bowler Vivian Kingma was found guilty of ball tampering, and was given a four-match ban.

== Squads ==
ODIs
Afghanistan	Netherlands
Hashmatullah Shahidi (c); Fareed Ahmad; Qais Ahmad; Yamin Ahmadzai; Ikram Alikhil; Sharafuddin Ashraf; Fazalhaq Farooqi; Usman Ghani; Rahmanullah Gurbaz; Riaz Hassan; Rashid Khan; Gulbadin Naib; Azmatullah Omarzai; Mujeeb Ur Rahman; Mohammad Saleem; Rahmat Shah; Shahidullah; Najibullah Zadran	Pieter Seelaar (c); Colin Ackermann; Musa Ahmed; Philippe Boissevain; Bas de Leede; Aryan Dutt; Scott Edwards; Clayton Floyd; Brandon Glover; Boris Gorlee; Vivian Kingma; Fred Klaassen; Ryan Klein; ~~Max O'Dowd~~; Asad Zulfiqar; Saqib Zulfiqar

On 12 January 2022, Musa Ahmed was added to the Dutch squad as a replacement for Max O'Dowd. Mohammad Nabi ruled himself out of Afghanistan's squad to allow younger players a chance to represent the team.

== ODI series ==
=== 1st ODI ===
21 January 2022
10:00
Scorecard

Afghanistan; 222/8 (50 overs)	v	Netherlands; 186 (48 overs)
Hashmatullah Shahidi 73 (94); Brandon Glover 3/43 (9 overs)		Scott Edwards 68 (82); Rashid Khan 3/31 (9 overs)

Afghanistan won by 36 runs
West End Park International Cricket Stadium, Doha
Umpires: Ahmed Shah Pakteen (Afg) and Izatullah Safi (Afg)
Player of the match: Hashmatullah Shahidi (Afg)

- Netherlands won the toss and elected to field.
- Shahidullah (Afg) and Boris Gorlee (Ned) both made their ODI debuts.
- Hashmatullah Shahidi captained Afghanistan for the first time in ODIs.
- This was the first men's ODI to be played at this venue.
- World Cup Super League points: Afghanistan 10, Netherlands 0.

=== 2nd ODI ===
23 January 2022
10:00
Scorecard

Afghanistan; 237/6 (50 overs)	v	Netherlands; 189 (47.4 overs)
Rahmanullah Gurbaz 103 (127); Philippe Boissevain 2/39 (8 overs)		Scott Edwards 86 (120); Mujeeb Ur Rahman 4/32 (9.4 overs)

Afghanistan won by 48 runs
West End Park International Cricket Stadium, Doha
Umpires: Ahmed Shah Pakteen (Afg) and Bismillah Jan Shinwari (Afg)
Player of the match: Rahmanullah Gurbaz (Afg)

- Afghanistan won the toss and elected to bat.
- Ryan Klein (Ned) made his ODI debut.
- World Cup Super League points: Afghanistan 10, Netherlands 0.

=== 3rd ODI ===
25 January 2022
10:00
Scorecard

Afghanistan; 254/5 (50 overs)	v	Netherlands; 179 (42.4 overs)
Najibullah Zadran 71 (59); Saqib Zulfiqar 1/13 (3 overs)		Colin Ackermann 81 (96); Qais Ahmad 3/32 (7.4 overs)

Afghanistan won by 75 runs
West End Park International Cricket Stadium, Doha
Umpires: Ahmed Shah Durrani (Afg) and Ahmed Shah Pakteen (Afg)
Player of the match: Najibullah Zadran (Afg)

- Afghanistan won the toss and elected to bat.
- Qais Ahmad, Fazalhaq Farooqi, Riaz Hassan (Afg) and Clayton Floyd (Ned) all made their ODI debuts.
- Netherlands penalised 5 penalty runs in over 30.5 of the Afghan innings for ball tampering.
- World Cup Super League points: Afghanistan 10, Netherlands 0.
