= Dutch cricket team in Zimbabwe in 2022–23 =

International cricket tour

Dutch cricket team Zimbabwe in 2022-23
	Zimbabwe	Netherlands
- Dates: 21 – 25 March 2023
Captains	Craig Ervine	Scott Edwards

One Day International series
- Results: Zimbabwe won the 3-match series 2–1
Most runs	Clive Madande (126)	Max O'Dowd (139)
Most wickets	Sikandar Raza (5)	Shariz Ahmad (8)
- Player of the series: Sean Williams (Zim)

The Netherlands men's cricket team toured Zimbabwe in March 2023 to play three One Day International (ODI) matches. The ODI series formed part of the inaugural 2020–2023 ICC Cricket World Cup Super League, and both teams' preparations for the 2023 Cricket World Cup Qualifier.

Earlier the series was scheduled to be played in September 2020, however, in August 2020, the tour was postponed due to the COVID-19 pandemic. Ahead of the series, the Netherlands played a 50-over warm up match against a Zimbabwe XI side.

In the first ODI, Netherlands recovered from 110/6 in their chase of the host's 249 to win by three wickets and with one ball remaining, with Teja Nidamanuru scoring an unbeaten century. Zimbabwe won the second ODI by a run, and levelled the series at one victory apiece, with Wesley Madhevere taking a hat-trick. Zimbabwe went on to win the third ODI by 7 wickets, and won the series 2–1.

== Squads ==
Zimbabwe	Netherlands
Craig Ervine (c); Gary Ballance; Ryan Burl; Tendai Chatara; Brad Evans; Innocent Kaia; Clive Madande (wk); Wesley Madhevere; Tadiwanashe Marumani (wk); Wellington Masakadza; Brandon Mavuta; Blessing Muzarabani; Richard Ngarava; Sikandar Raza; Sean Williams	Scott Edwards (c, wk); Colin Ackermann; Musa Ahmed; Shariz Ahmad; Wesley Barresi; Tom Cooper; ~~Bas de Leede~~; Aryan Dutt; Brandon Glover; Vivian Kingma; Fred Klaassen; Ryan Klein; Teja Nidamanuru; Max O'Dowd; Vikramjit Singh; ~~Roelof van der Merwe~~; Paul van Meekeren

On 16 March 2023, Bas de Leede was ruled out of the series due to heel injury, with Aryan Dutt was named as his replacement. Roelof van der Merwe withdrew from the Netherlands' squad citing personal reasons.

== Tour match ==
19 March 2023
09:15
Scorecard

Netherlands; 191 (42.2 overs)	v	Zimbabwe XI; 182 (34.5 overs)
Musa Ahmed 84 (104); Johnathan Campbell 4/35 (10 overs)		Brian Bennett 53 (62); Paul van Meekeren 4/27 (5.5 overs)

Netherlands won by 9 runs
Old Hararians, Harare
Umpires: Percival Sizara (Zim) and Tafadzwa Musakwa (Zim)

- Netherlands won the toss and elected to bat.

== ODI series ==
=== 1st ODI ===
21 March 2023
09:15
Scorecard

Zimbabwe; 249 (47.3 overs)	v	Netherlands; 255/7 (49.5 overs)
Clive Madande 74 (98); Fred Klaassen 3/41 (9.3 overs)		Teja Nidamanuru 110* (96); Wellington Masakadza 3/36 (10 overs)

Netherlands won by 3 wickets
Harare Sports Club, Harare
Umpires: Iknow Chabi (Zim) and Aleem Dar (Pak)
Player of the match: Teja Nidamanuru (Ned)

- Netherlands won the toss and elected to field.
- Teja Nidamanuru (Ned) scored his first century in ODIs.
- World Cup Super League points: Netherlands 10, Zimbabwe 0.

=== 2nd ODI ===
23 March 2023
09:15
Scorecard

Zimbabwe; 271 (49.2 overs)	v	Netherlands; 270 (50 overs)
Sean Williams 77 (73); Shariz Ahmad 5/43 (10 overs)		Max O'Dowd 81 (103); Wesley Madhevere 3/36 (9 overs)

Zimbabwe won by 1 run
Harare Sports Club, Harare
Umpires: Aleem Dar (Pak) and Forster Mutizwa (Zim)
Player of the match: Wesley Madhevere (Zim)

- Zimbabwe won the toss and elected to bat.
- Shariz Ahmad (Ned) took his first five-wicket haul in ODIs.
- Wesley Madhevere became the third cricketer from Zimbabwe to a hat-trick in ODIs. It was the 50th instance, when a cricketer took a hat-trick in ODIs.
- World Cup Super League points: Zimbabwe 10, Netherlands 0.

=== 3rd ODI ===
25 March 2023
09:15
Scorecard

Netherlands; 231/9 (50 overs)	v	Zimbabwe; 235/3 (41.4 overs)
Max O'Dowd 38 (43); Sean Williams 3/41 (10 overs)		Gary Ballance 64* (72); Shariz Ahmad 2/71 (9.4 overs)

Zimbabwe won by 7 wickets
Harare Sports Club, Harare
Umpires: Aleem Dar (Pak) and Langton Rusere (Zim)
Player of the match: Sean Williams (Zim)

- Netherlands won the toss and elected to bat.
- World Cup Super League points: Zimbabwe 10, Netherlands 0.
