= Tim McDonald =

Tim McDonald may refer to:

- Tim McDonald (American football) (born 1965), American football safety
- T. J. McDonald (born 1991), American football safety
- Tim McDonald (comedian), Australian comedian
