= Big Brother (Australian TV series) season 17 =

Big Brother
- Season 17
- Presented by: Mel Tracina
- No. of housemates: 17
- No. of episodes: 18

Release
- Original network: Network 10
- Original release: 26 October 2026 – present

Additional information
- Filming dates: 25 October 2026 – present

Season chronology
- ← Previous; Season 16

The seventeenth season of the Australian reality television series Big Brother, also known as Big Brother 2026, began airing on 26 October 2026. It is the second season to air since the show's revival on Network 10 the previous year, and the eleventh season overall on the network.

Mel Tracina returns as host alongside narrator Mike Goldman, with production relocated to the Screen Queensland Studios in Hemmant, Brisbane.

== Format ==
As in the other seasons of the show, the series revolves around a group of strangers living in a house together with no communication with the outside world. Referred to as "housemates", the group are constantly filmed during their time in the house and are not permitted to communicate with those filming them, except with the titular "Big Brother" – an embodiment of the show's producers. Each week, the housemates nominate who they wish to leave the house and those with the most nominations face eviction, with the Australian public voting for which nominees should be evicted, with the evictee leaving during a live show. This process continues until only one housemate remained to win the grand prize.

== Production ==
In April 2026, Network 10 confirmed that Big Brother would return for a seventeenth season. In a statement, the network said "the social experiment is back and bigger than ever" [...] "Expect even more twists, unexpected friendships, hilarity, tantrums, and maybe a showmance or two!". It was announced that the series would be filmed at a new "purpose built house" in Brisbane, moving from the previous location of within Dreamworld. Casting for the series opening in May 2026, and remained open until August. Audition tapes of the potential housemates were posted on YouTube in the months leading up to the season premiere.

The first trailer for the season was released in September 2026, which featured host Mel Tracina singing a version of the song "It's Oh So Quiet" with lyrics relating to the new season of Big Brother.

== Housemates ==
The 14 original housemates were revealed and entered on the Launch Night. Evie Maree McClelland entered as an intruder on Day 18. Nathan Harris and Tara Stafford entered as Intruders on Day 24.

Contestants Ryan Macri and Tahlia Macri are siblings and were originally tasked with entering the house while hiding their relationship. Anita Bingham is the sister of Big Brother 2003 and Big Brother 2022 winner Reggie Sorensen, whilst Pam Davidson is the mother of Big Brother 2020 housemate Kieran Davidson. She was also a contestant on the second season of the Netflix series, Squid Game: The Challenge.

Name	Age on entry	Residence	Occupation	Day entered	Day exited	Result
Anita Bingham	47	Tasmania	Travel advisor	1		Participating
Austin Hendrey	22	Queensland	Carpenter	1		Participating
Ebony Vandermont	23	Victoria	Entrepreneur	1		Participating
Evie Maree McClelland	29	Coffs Harbour, New South Wales	Model & social media influencer	18		Participating
Kyrah Brock-Fenton	25	Sydney, New South Wales	English & Drama teacher	1		Participating
Matthew "Matty" Michael	39	Western Australia	Mining commentator	1		Participating
Nathan Harris	25	Victoria	Teacher	24		Participating
Tahlia Macri	25	Victoria	Support worker	1		Participating
Ryan Macri	27	New South Wales	Garden centre manager	1		Participating
Tara Stafford	41	Gold Coast, Queensland	Business owner	24		Participating
Heath Slater	23	Gold Coast, Queensland	Engineering student	1	29	Evicted
Charity Bosco	29	New South Wales	Field manager	1	29	Evicted
Andrew "Marshy" Marschall	24	South Australia	Forklift salesman	1	24	Evicted
Matthew Karlsson	37	Victoria	Property investor	1	22	Evicted
Pheobe Joyce	26	Queensland	Hardware store worker	1	15	Evicted
Pam Davidson	62	Adelaide, South Australia	Teacher	1	10	Evicted
Harmon Singh	29	Queensland	IT salesman	1	8	Evicted

== Twists ==
=== Prize money ===
Like season 16, the prize money started at $100,000. However, housemates can add money to (or remove money from) the prize pool by successfully completing various tasks and dilemmas.

	Event	Offered	+/-	Running total	Possible Prize
Week 1	Initial amount	$100,000	—N/a	$100,000	$100,000
Week 1	Trick or Treat	$25,000	+$25,000	$125,000	$125,000

=== Head Housemate ===
The Head Housemate twist returned from season 16. The Head Housemate would assign household chores to each housemate, sleep in the queen bed in the bedroom, receive personal luxuries, and control the house's weekly shop.

They also had immunity from eviction and had the power to save a housemate from eviction, with the next highest-voted housemate or housemates nominated in their place.

The position is appointed by various means, but mostly by the most recent evictee:

- In the first week, Ryan & Tahlia appointed the Head Housemate after succeeding in their secret relationship task.
- In the middle of the third week, Evie was appointed as the Head Housemate as a result of being the Intruder.

	Appointed By	Appointed Head Housemate
Week 1	Ryan & Tahlia	Matty
Week 2	Harmon	Ebony
Week 3	Pheobe	Kyrah
Week 3	Big Brother	Evie
Week 4	Matthew	Austin
Week 5	Charity	Ebony
Week 5	Heath	Tahlia

== Weekly summary ==
The main events in the Big Brother Australia 17 house are summarised in the table below.

Week 1	Entrances	On Day 1, Kyrah, Heath, Matthew, Charity, Ryan, Tahlia, Marshy, Anita, Ebony, Pam, Austin, Pheobe, Matty and Harmon entered the House.
Week 1	Twists	Before entering the House, Big Brother gave Ryan and Tahlia a secret mission. As siblings, they couldn't let the other housemates know they were related. If successful, Big Brother would reward them with immunity. If unsuccessful, Big Brother would punish them by evicting one of the two on the spot. On Day 3, housemates were given an opportunity to guess which two were the siblings. Housemates guessed incorrectly, thus earning Ryan and Tahlia immunity from this week's eviction.; On Day 3, as Ryan and Tahlia successfully remained undetected from the secret mission, they were given the power to name the first Head Housemate. They named Matty as the first Head Housemate.; On Day 8, housemates must select a housemate to participate in a game of "Trick of Treat", where they must select one of the two cauldrons randomly. One contains a "Treat" that add $25,000 to the prize money. Another contains a "Trick", in which the chosen housemate must directly nominate someone up for eviction next week. Matthew was selected and chose the "Treat" cauldron.
Week 1	Tasks	On Day 1, Big Brother revealed a partially furnished house - including the Diary Room without a chair, a Bathroom without working showers, and an unfurnished Bedroom, leaving the Housemates to sleep on the floor. At the end of the Launch Show broadcast, voting opened for Australia to give three Housemates beds.; On Day 2, housemates were given a chance to earn themselves a hot dinner by giving up their most prized possessions. The higher the value, the bigger and better the dinner would be. Housemates successfully completed this task and earned themselves a BBQ later that evening.; On Day 2, Big Brother revealed that Anita, Pam, and Tahlia were chosen by the Australian public to be given beds. Later, on Day 3, the rest of the housemates were given their beds.; On Day 3, housemates completed a questionnaire about themselves, as part of the Big Brother Awards later that evening.; On Day 5, housemates were given a task to take portrait photos of themselves within 45 minutes. They are not allowed to delete any photos or change any camera settings. They were also given inspiration photos and limited tools to help with their photoshoot.; On Day 6, nominated housemates, Ebony, Harmon, and Kyrah, were given a chance to plead their case to stay in the Big Brother house, by finding a phone in a secret hatch and record their pleas. They had five minutes to find it, in which once one person found it, they had a choice to either share the phone to the rest or keep it to themselves. Kyrah found the phone and keep it to herself.; On Day 6, housemates participated in a Halloween party. However, Head Housemate, Matty, had to select four housemates to sit out and stay in the graveyard area in the garden and are only allowed to talk to the rest from the door. He selected Ebony, Harmon, Kyra, and Pam.
Week 1	Nominations	On Day 5, housemates nominated for the first time. Harmon, Ebony, and Kyrah received the most points (22 points and both 11 points respectively) and are nominated for eviction this week. As Head Housemate, Matty decided not to use his power to save a nominee, therefore leaving the nominations intact for this week.
Week 1	Exits	On Day 8, Harmon became the first housemate to be evicted, after receiving the fewest votes to save.
Week 2
Week 2	Twists	On Day 8, following his eviction, Harmon named Ebony as the second Head Housemate.; On Day 9, the Red Button was placed inside the House. At any point during the week, the Red Button may activate which grants a housemate (or a group of a housemate, or the entire House) a reward, a punishment, or both.; On Day 15, after Phoebe's eviction, it was also revealed that Kyrah has the second-least amount of votes to save and was the fourth housemate evicted. However, due to Red Button twist, the button was lit up and pressed by Marshy. As a result, her eviction was cancelled.
Week 2	Nominations	On Day 9, housemates nominated for the second time. Matty, Matthew, Pheobe, Anita, Kyrah, Pam, and Tahlia received the most points (15, 11, 9, 6, 6, 6, and 6 points respectively) and are nominated for eviction this week. As Head Housemate, Ebony decided to use her power to save Matthew and putting Ryan (who received 5 points) up for eviction alongside the initial nominees.
Week 2	Tasks	On Days 9-11, housemates participated in their first shopping task of "Rent a Housemate", where housemates are assigned into groups, and complete shifts given to them by customers. The housemates were required to demonstrate teamwork, right attitude and attention to detail. They passed the task and thus received a luxury shopping budget of $350.; On Day 12, housemates participated in Pickers Friday Night Games, where housemates participate in a series of games. As Head Housemate, Ebony selected Matty and Matthew as the team captains. Matty selected Austin, Charity, Heath, Phoebe and Tahlia for his team, while Matthew selected Anita, Ebony, Kyrah, Marshy and Ryan for his team. To advance to the final round, a team must acquire two wins from those games. Matty's team won, with Heath and Tahlia winning the final challenge.; On Day 13, housemates were given statements from the Australian public about themselves. They have to discuss and guess which statement belongs to whom.
Week 2	Exits	On Day 10, Pam became the second housemate evicted during a party, after receiving the fewest votes to save.; On Day 15, Phoebe became the third housemate evicted after receiving the fewest votes to save.
Week 3	Twists	On Day 16, following her eviction, Pheobe named Kyrah as the third Head Housemate.; On Day 18, Evie was appointed as the fourth Head Housemate, replacing Kyrah's on-going reign. As a result, Kyrah was appointed as the Security Guard for the House until Day 20.
Week 3	Nominations	On Day 16, housemates nominated for the third time. Austin, Heath, and Matthew received the most points (14, 11, and 9 points respectively) and are nominated for eviction. As Head Housemate, Kyrah decided not to use her power to save a nominee, therefore leaving the nominations intact for this week.
Week 3	Tasks	On Days 16-18, housemates participated in their second shopping task of "BB Cruise", where housemates are divided into two groups: the passengers and the crew. The crew must provide the passengers a luxury five-star experience and must keep the place ship shape at all times, as well as carry out emergency procedures when needed. Additionally, a captain was also appointed to oversee the crew. Matthew was appointed as the captain, wheras Anita, Ebony, Heath and Ryan were crewmates. The rest were the passengers of the cruise. They passed the task and thus received a luxury shopping budget of $300.; On Day 19, Matty was assigned as a secret task to get someone (or himself) saying certain words and phrases. He passed the task and won a KFC meal for the whold House.; On Day 19, Evie was assigned a speed-dating task, to get to know every housemate in the House.; On Day 20, housemates were given statements from the Australian public about themselves for the second time. They have to discuss and guess which statement belongs to whom.; On Day 20, nominated housemates, Austin, Heath, and Matthew, were given a chance to plead their case to stay in the Big Brother house, by finding a phone in a secret hatch and record their pleas. They had five minutes to find it, in which once one person found it, they had a choice to either share the phone to the rest or keep it to themselves. Matthew found the phone and keep it to himself.
Week 3	Entrances	On Day 18, Evie entered the House as the Intruder, during the House's prom party.; On Day 20, Snowy, Anita's dog, entered the House for a short period of time.
Week 3	Exits	On Day 22, Matthew became the fourth housemate evicted after receiving the fewest votes to save.
Week 4	Twists	On Day 22, following his eviction, Matthew named Austin as the fifth Head Housemate.
Week 4	Nominations	On Days 23-25, housemates nominated for the fourth time. Heath, Charity, Kyrah, Marshy, and Tahlia received the most points (11, 9, 9, 7, and 7 points respectively) and are nominated for eviction. As Head Housemate, Austin decided not to use his power to save a nominee, therefore leaving the nominations intact for this week.
Week 4	Tasks	On Days 23-25, housemates participated in their third shopping task of "Big Brother's House of Zen". To pass the task, housemates must remain positive every time a gong sound once. If a gong sound twice, positivity would no longer be compulsory. They must also complete a series of mini-tasks, in addition to their main task. Their food are also taken away and replaced with meals provided by Big Brother. They failed the task and thus received a basic shopping budget of $150.
Week 4	Exits	On Day 24, Marshy became the fifth housemate evicted in an Instant eviction, after receiving the fewest votes to save.; On Day 29, Charity became the sixth housemate evicted, after receiving the fewest votes to save. Heath then became the seventh housemate evicted, after receiving the next fewest votes to save.
Week 4	Entrances	On Day 24, Nathan and Tara entered the House as the Intruders.

== Episodes ==
No. overall	No. in season	Title	Day(s)	Original release date	Australian viewers
Week 1
1668	1	Launch / Daily Show 1	Day 1	26 October 2026	540,000
1669	2	Daily Show 2	Day 2	27 October 2026	446,000
1670	3	Daily Show 3	Day 3	28 October 2026	454,000
1671	4	Live Nominations 1	Days 4–5	29 October 2026	395,000
1672	5	Daily Show 4	Day 5	30 October 2026	351,000
1673	6	Live Eviction 1	Days 6 and 8	1 November 2026	410,000
Week 2
1674	7	Live Nominations 2	Days 8–9	2 November 2026	431,000
1675	8	Daily Show 5	Day 9	3 November 2026	453,000
1676	9	Daily Show 6	Day 10	4 November 2026	451,000
1677	10	Daily Show 7	Day 11	5 November 2026	420,000
1678	11	Daily Show 8	Day 12	6 November 2026	378,000
1679	12	Live Eviction 2	Days 13 and 15	8 November 2026	454,000
Week 3
1680	13	Live Nominations 3	Days 15–16	9 November 2026	471,000
1681	14	Daily Show 9	Day 16	10 November 2026	460,000
1682	15	Daily Show 10 / Live Intruder Special	Day 17–18	11 November 2026	428,000
1683	16	Daily Show 11	Day 18	12 November 2026	418,000
1684	17	Daily Show 12	Day 19	13 November 2026	328,000
1685	18	Live Eviction 3	Days 20 and 22	15 November 2026	458,000
Week 4
1686	19	Live Nominations 4	Days 22–23	16 November 2026	445,000
1687	20	Daily Show 13	Day 23	17 November 2026	447,000
1688	21	Daily Show 14	Day 24	18 November 2026	TBD
1689	22	Daily Show 15	Day 25	19 November 2026	TBD
1690	23	Daily Show 16	Day 26	20 November 2026	TBD
1691	24	Live Eviction 4	Days 27 and 29	22 November 2026	TBD

== Nominations table ==
Like last season, Housemates nominated two Housemates, with five nomination points, allowing a 4-1 or 3-2 point allocation. The Head Housemate (in most cases, appointed by the most recent evictee) had immunity from nomination. The three or more housemates with the most points face the public vote. After voting, the Head Housemate could save one of the original nominees, with the next-highest vote recipient becoming a nominee.

Colour key:

Head Housemate
Immune
Evicted
Saved From Eviction By Twist

	Week 1	Week 2	Week 3	Week 4	Week 5	Week 6	Final	Nomination points received
Head Housemate(s)	Matty	Ebony	Kyrah; Evie	Austin	Ebony; Tahlia			Nomination points received
Anita	4–Ebony; 1–Harmon	3–Pheobe; 2–Pam	3–Ebony; 2–Matthew	3–Ebony; 2–Tahlia				16
Austin	4–Harmon; 1–Kyrah	3–Tahlia; 2–Matty	3–Heath; 2–Ryan	3–Heath; 2–Ryan				18
Ebony	3–Kyrah; 2–Anita	4–Anita; 1–Matty	3–Marshy; 2–Heath	3–Marshy; 2–Heath	Head; Housemate			24
Evie	Not in House		Head; Housemate	4–Heath; 1–Tahlia				0
Kyrah	4–Ebony; 1–Matthew	3–Matty; 2–Matthew	4–Charity; 1–Ebony	3–Ryan; 2–Tahlia				26
Matty	3–Austin; 2–Matthew	3–Pheobe; 2–Pam	4–Austin; 1–Charity	4–Charity; 1–Anita				15
Nathan	Not in House							0
Ryan	3–Harmon; 2–Pam	3–Pheobe; 2–Kyrah	3–Matthew; 2–Austin	4–Kyrah; 1–Charity				15
Tahlia	3–Anita; 2–Harmon	4–Kyrah; 1–Austin	3–Matthew; 2–Austin	4–Kyrah; 1–Marshy	Head; Housemate			13
Tara	Not in House							0
Heath	3–Harmon; 2–Pheobe	3–Matthew; 2–Matty	3–Ebony; 2–Austin	4–Charity; 1–Kyrah	Evicted (Day 29)			22
Charity	3–Anita; 2–Ebony	3–Ryan; 2–Anita	3–Ryan; 2–Heath	3–Marshy; 2–Heath	Evicted (Day 29)			14
Marshy	3–Harmon; 2–Pam	3–Matthew; 2–Pam	4–Austin; 1–Matthew	3–Ebony; 2–Tahlia	Evicted (Day 24)			11
Matthew	3–Kyrah; 2–Harmon	3–Tahlia; 2–Matty	4–Heath; 1–Marshy	Evicted (Day 22)				27
Pheobe	4–Matthew; 1–Anita	3–Matthew; 2–Matty	Evicted (Day 15)					12
Pam	4–Harmon; 1–Ebony	3–Matty; 2–Ryan	Evicted (Day 10)					10
Harmon	4–Kyrah; 1–Pheobe	Evicted (Day 8)						22
Notes	1	2, 3, 4	5	2, 6, 7				
Nominated (pre-save)	Harmon, Ebony, Kyrah	Anita, Kyrah, Matthew, Matty, Pam, Pheobe, Tahlia	Austin, Heath, Matthew	Charity, Heath, Kyrah, Marshy, Tahlia				
Saved	none	Matthew	none	none				
Against public vote	Harmon, Ebony, Kyrah	Anita, Kyrah, Matty, Pam, Pheobe, Ryan, Tahlia	Austin, Heath, Matthew	Charity, Heath, Kyrah, Marshy, Tahlia				
Evicted	Harmon; Fewest votes to save	Pam; Fewest votes to save (out of 7)	Matthew; Fewest votes to save	Marshy; Fewest votes to save (out of 5)				
Evicted	Harmon; Fewest votes to save	Pheobe; Fewest votes to save (out of 6)	Matthew; Fewest votes to save	Charity; Fewest votes to save (out of 4)				
Evicted	Harmon; Fewest votes to save	Kyrah; ~~Fewest votes~~ to save (out of 6)	Matthew; Fewest votes to save	Heath; Fewest votes to save (out of 4)				

=== Notes ===
- ^Note 1: As a result of succeeding in their secret sibling task, Ryan and Tahlia were awarded immunity from the first eviction. The pair also appointed the first Head Housemate, choosing Matty.
- ^Note 2: For this round of nominations, the four or more Housemates with the most points would face the public vote.
- ^Note 3: On Day 10, an Instant Eviction occurred during a party. Pam was evicted after receiving the fewest votes to save from the public. Voting remained open for the remaining nominees for the next eviction on Day 15. As Pam's eviction was revealed during Episode 6, the option to vote for Pam on the website stayed open briefly after her eviction, but any votes cast did not count.
- ^Note 4: On Day 15, after Phoebe was evicted, Big Brother revealed that another Housemate might also be evicted, but that the eviction could be nullified if another Housemate pressed the big red button when it was announced. Kyrah was announced as the next-lowest vote recipient and potential evictee. After the announcement, Marshy pressed the button, nullifying Kyrah's eviction.
- ^Note 5: On Day 18, Evie entered the house as the intruder and was appointed Head Housemate by Big Brother, replacing Kyrah, who was the incumbent Head Housemate. As this occurred after nominations, Kyrah held the Head Housemate immunity and Save power for the week.
- ^Note 6: As the recent intruder, Evie was immune from being nominated, but could still nominate.
- ^Note 7: On Day 24, an Instant Eviction occurred during a mediation for the House of Zen task. Marshy was evicted after receiving the fewest votes to save from the public. Voting remained open for the remaining nominees for the next eviction on Day 29 - which was a Double Eviction. As Marshy's eviction was revealed during Episode 21, the option to vote for Marshy on the website stayed open briefly after his eviction, but any votes cast did not count.
- ^Note 8: As a result of the Doubel Eviciton on Day 29, both evictees appointed a Head Housemate - resulting on both becomming Co-Head Housemates.

== Ratings ==
Ratings are rounded to the nearest ten thousand. Viewership data is from OzTAM and represents the consolidated National average viewership within a week after broadcast.

	Viewers (millions) National						
	Week 1	Week 2	Week 3	Week 4	Week 5	Week 6	Final Week
Sunday	—	0.61	0.61				
Monday	0.82	0.62	0.63				
Tuesday	0.73	0.65	0.64				
Wednesday	0.71	0.65	0.59				
Thursday	0.62	0.60	0.58				
Friday	0.60	0.58					
Weekly average	0.70	0.62					
Running average	0.70	0.66					
Season average	TBD						
blue-coloured boxes denote live shows.
