= Boris Gorlee =

Dutch cricketer (born 2001)

Personal information
- Full name: Boris Harro Gabriel Gorlee
- Born: 22 February 2001 (age 25); The Hague, Netherlands
- Batting: Right-handed
- Bowling: Right-arm off-break
- Role: Batsman

International information
- National side: Netherlands
- ODI debut (cap 76): 21 January 2022 v Afghanistan
- Last ODI: 25 January 2022 v Afghanistan

Career statistics
Competition	ODI	List A
Matches	3	3
Runs scored	29	29
Batting average	9.66	9.66
100s/50s	0/0	0/0
Top score	16	16
Catches/stumpings	0/–	0/–
- Source: Cricinfo, 30 March 2022

Boris Harro Gabriel Gorlee (born 22 February 2001) is a Dutch cricketer. In July 2019, he captained the Netherlands under-19 side at the Under-19 Cricket World Cup European qualifier event that was played in his home country. He was called up to the senior Netherlands squad for a tour of South Africa in November 2021. Gorlee was again selected for the squad when the Netherlands travelled to Qatar for a One Day International (ODI) series against Afghanistan in January 2022. He made his ODI debut against Afghanistan on 21 January 2021. The following month, he was named in the Dutch Twenty20 International (T20I) squad for their series against New Zealand. As of December 2023, Gorlee had played three ODIs for the national side.
