= Mark Bracewell =

New Zealand cricketer

Personal information
- Full name: Mark Andrew Bracewell
- Born: 8 October 1955 (age 71); Auckland, New Zealand
- Batting: Right-handed
- Bowling: Right-arm medium
- Relatives: Michael Bracewell (son); Brendon Bracewell (brother); John Bracewell (brother); Douglas Bracewell (brother); Doug Bracewell (nephew); Melanie Bracewell (niece)

Domestic team information
- Years: Team
- 1977/78: Otago
- 1979/80: Central Districts
- 1979/80–1983/84: Wairarapa
- Only FC: 26 December 1977 Otago v Wellington
- Only LA: 25 November 1979 Central Districts v Northern Districts

Career statistics
Competition	First-class	List A
Matches	1	1
Runs scored	8	8
Batting average	–	–
100s/50s	0/0	0/0
Top score	7*	8*
Balls bowled	96	42
Wickets	0	1
Bowling average	–	35.00
5 wickets in innings	–	0
10 wickets in match	–	0
Best bowling	–	1/35
Catches/stumpings	0/–	0/–
- Source: CricInfo, 26 June 2025

Mark Andrew Bracewell (born 8 October 1955) is a New Zealand former cricketer. He played one first-class match for Otago during the 1977–78 season and one List A match for Central Districts in 1979–80.

Bracewell was born at Auckland in 1955 into a well-known cricketing family. Three of his four brothers, Brendon, John and Douglas played first-class cricket, with Brendon and John playing Test and One Day International matches for the New Zealand national cricket team. Their father, also John, had played Hawke Cup cricket for Rangitikei in 1947–48, and Bracewell's son, Michael Bracewell, and nephew Doug have both played international cricket for the national team.

Bracewell was educated at Tauranga Boys' College. Bracewell played some cricket for Bay of Plenty in 1972–73 and toured Australia with the New Zealand Schools team the following year. He played age-group cricket for Otago from 1974–75 to 1977–78, the season in which played his only first-class match, a Christmas-period match against Wellington at the Basin Reserve. Primarily a bowler, Bracewell did not take a wicket in the match, although he scored eight runs without being out.

Bracewell's only other senior cricket appearance was an early season National Knockout Trophy match for Central Districts against Northern Districts. The 50 over match―in what was a List A competition―saw him open the bowling alongside his brother Brendon. He took a single wicket and scored eight not out in a losing cause. Bracewell played Hawke Cup and Chapple Cup cricket for Wairarapa from 1979–80 to 1983–84.

After playing cricket, Bracewell played rugby union for Wairarapara-Bush and Wellington. He taught at Trinity Catholic College, Dunedin until 2007 when he joined the Otago Cricket Association. He managed the Otago team, acted as caretaker coach in 2009, and has been a selector for the Otago team.
