= Sportpark Maarschalkerweerd =

Dutch cricket ground

Coordinates: 52°04′38″N 05°09′14″E

- Interactive map of Sportpark Maarschalkerweerd

Ground information
- Location: Utrecht, Netherlands
- Country: Netherlands
- Establishment: 1967 (first recorded match)
- Capacity: Unknown
- End names
- n/a n/a

International information
- First men's ODI: 2 June 2021: Netherlands v Ireland
- Last men's ODI: 16 May 2025: Netherlands v Scotland
- First men's T20I: 25 May 2019: Germany v Italy
- Last men's T20I: 26 August 2024: Netherlands v Canada
- First women's ODI: 25 June 2002: Netherlands v New Zealand
- Last women's ODI: 6 August 2024: Scotland v Papua New Guinea
- First women's T20I: 1 July 2008: Netherlands v West Indies
- Last women's T20I: 13 June 2025: Netherlands v United States
- As of 13 June 2025; Source: Ground profile

Sportpark Maarschalkerweerd is a cricket ground in Utrecht, Netherlands. The first recorded cricket match on the ground came in 1967 when the Netherlands Women's Cricket Board XI played the Women's Cricket Association. The ground is also used by Kampong Cricket Club.

The ground is somewhat a de facto home ground for the Netherlands Women's team, having played host to numerous Dutch women's teams since 1967. It held two Women's One Day Internationals in 2002 between the Netherlands Women and New Zealand Women. Further matches in that format were held, with South Africa Women visiting in 2007, West Indies Women playing two matches there in 2008, and Ireland Women visiting in 2011. Five Women's Twenty20 Internationals have also been played there between 2008 and 2011.

The men's national team played a first-class match there in the 2005 Intercontinental Cup against Scotland. In July 2018, it hosted ten matches of the 2018 ICC Women's World Twenty20 Qualifier tournament. In May 2019, it hosted men's Twenty20 International matches between Germany and Italy. The first men's One Day International (ODI) match took place at the venue on 2 June 2021, when the Netherlands played Ireland.
