= Irish cricket team in the Netherlands in 2021 =

International cricket tour

	Netherlands	Ireland
- Dates: 2 – 7 June 2021
Captains	Pieter Seelaar	Andrew Balbirnie

One Day International series
- Results: Netherlands won the 3-match series 2–1
Most runs	Stephan Myburgh (105)	Paul Stirling (126)
Most wickets	Logan van Beek (6)	Josh Little (8)
- Player of the series: Logan van Beek (Ned)

The Ireland cricket team toured the Netherlands in June 2021 to play three One Day International (ODI). The ODI matches formed part of the inaugural 2020–2023 ICC Cricket World Cup Super League. The teams last played an ODI against each other in July 2013, during the 2011–2013 ICC World Cricket League Championship, with the match ending in a tie.

Cricket Ireland confirmed the fixtures in February 2021, and the matches were played at the Sportpark Maarschalkerweerd in Utrecht. The matches were shown on Ziggo in the Netherlands, the first time a Dutch international cricket series was broadcast live in the country.

The Netherlands won the first ODI by one run with the match going down to the final ball. Ireland then won the next match by eight wickets to level the series. The Netherlands won the third and final ODI by four wickets to win the series 2–1.

== Squads ==
ODIs
Netherlands	Ireland
Pieter Seelaar (c); Musa Ahmed; Philippe Boissevain; Ben Cooper; Bas de Leede; Scott Edwards; Brandon Glover; Vivian Kingma; Fred Klaassen; Stephan Myburgh; Max O'Dowd; Logan van Beek; Timm van der Gugten; Tobias Visee; Saqib Zulfiqar	Andrew Balbirnie (c); Mark Adair; ~~Gareth Delany~~; George Dockrell; Josh Little; Andy McBrine; Graeme McCarter; Barry McCarthy; Kevin O'Brien; William Porterfield; Simi Singh; Paul Stirling; Harry Tector; Lorcan Tucker; Ben White; Craig Young

Cricket Ireland also named Peter Chase, Stephen Doheny, Graham Kennedy and David O'Halloran as additional players for the tour. Graeme McCarter was named in Ireland's squad, after last playing an ODI for the team in 2014. Ahead of the series, Gareth Delany was ruled out of Ireland's squad due to an injury, with Ben White named as his replacement.

== ODI series ==
=== 1st ODI ===
2 June 2021
10:30
Scorecard

Netherlands; 195 (50 overs)	v	Ireland; 194/9 (50 overs)
Timm van der Gugten 49 (53); Josh Little 3/32 (10 overs)		Paul Stirling 69 (112); Pieter Seelaar 3/27 (9 overs)

Netherlands won by 1 run
Sportpark Maarschalkerweerd, Utrecht
Umpires: Nitin Bathi (Ned) and Adrian Holdstock (SA)
Player of the match: Timm van der Gugten (Ned)

- Netherlands won the toss and elected to bat.
- This was the first ODI match to be played at this ground.
- World Cup Super League points: Netherlands 10, Ireland 0.

=== 2nd ODI ===
4 June 2021
10:30
Scorecard

Netherlands; 157 (49.2 overs)	v	Ireland; 158/2 (43 overs)
Max O'Dowd 36 (59); Craig Young 4/18 (9.2 overs)		Andrew Balbirnie 63* (127); Logan van Beek 1/34 (7 overs)

Ireland won by 8 wickets
Sportpark Maarschalkerweerd, Utrecht
Umpires: Rizwan Akram (Ned) and Adrian Holdstock (SA)
Player of the match: Josh Little (Ire)

- Netherlands won the toss and elected to bat.
- World Cup Super League points: Ireland 10, Netherlands 0.

=== 3rd ODI ===
7 June 2021
10:30
Scorecard

Ireland; 163 (49.2 overs)	v	Netherlands; 166/6 (45.5 overs)
Harry Tector 58 (100); Fred Klaassen 3/23 (10 overs)		Stephan Myburgh 74 (111); Simi Singh 3/29 (9.5 overs)

Netherlands won by 4 wickets
Sportpark Maarschalkerweerd, Utrecht
Umpires: Adrian Holdstock (SA) and Adriaan van den Dries (Ned)
Player of the match: Stephan Myburgh (Ned)

- Ireland won the toss and elected to bat.
- Musa Ahmed (Ned) made his ODI debut.
- World Cup Super League points: Netherlands 10, Ireland 0.
