= Mel Tracina =

Australian television and radio presenter, comedian and media personality (born 1989)

- Born: Melissa Tracina; 10 September 1989 (age 36); Melbourne, Victoria, Australia
- Education: La Trobe University
- Occupations: Television and radio presenter; comedian; media personality
- Years active: 2011–present
- Employers: Network 10; Nova
- Television: Big Brother Australia
- Spouse: Stefan Burford (m. 2016)

Melissa Tracina (born 10 September 1989) is an Australian television and radio presenter, comedian and media personality.

She currently hosts Network 10's Big Brother Australia as well as presenting the entertainment segments on the weekly comedy panel show The Cheap Seats. She also hosts the national workday radio show on Nova, in all major capital cities except Perth.

== Career ==
Tracina began working in radio as an announcer for the Student Youth Network while studying at La Trobe University, and graduated with a Bachelor of Arts in 2011. She later landed a job as the breakfast announcer at Zoo FM in Dubbo.

In 2018, Tracina joined the Nova Network and currently hosts the national day-time show from 9am to 2pm in all major capital cities except Perth.

In 2021, Tracina joined the brand-new Network 10 panel comedy show The Cheap Seats as the culture correspondent, joining the show's hosts Tim McDonald and Melanie Bracewell to present the entertainment segment every week. The show launched on 20 July 2021.

In September 2024, Network 10 announced that the reality television show Big Brother Australia would be returning to the network in the second half of 2025, with Tracina as host, replacing Sonia Kruger, who hosted the show during its time on both the Nine Network and the Seven Network. The Network teased that it will return to its original live format. In July 2025, Tracina confirmed that the house will be located at Dreamworld on the Gold Coast. The series premiered on 9 November 2025.

In December 2024, Tracina was announced to be hosting the summer breakfast show on Nova alongside Matt Baseley, while the regular breakfast hosts were on holiday breaks. They returned again in April and September 2025 respectively, and were joined by Susie O'Neill.

In November 2025, she appeared on an episode of Deal or No Deal, playing to win money for charity.

== Personal life ==
Tracina married her long-term partner Stefan in October 2016.
