= Shariz Ahmad =

Dutch cricketer (born 2003)

Personal information
- Full name: Shariz Ahmad
- Born: 21 April 2003 (age 23); Amsterdam, Netherlands
- Batting: Left-handed
- Bowling: Legbreak googly
- Role: Bowler
- Relatives: Musa Ahmed (brother)

International information
- National side: Netherlands
- ODI debut (cap 81): 2 June 2022 v West Indies
- Last ODI: 9 November 2024 v UAE
- ODI shirt no.: 18
- T20I debut (cap 55): 11 July 2022 v PNG
- Last T20I: 3 September 2025 v Bangladesh
- T20I shirt no.: 18

Career statistics
Competition	ODI	T20I	LA	T20
Matches	20	14	20	14
Runs scored	159	65	159	65
Batting average	10.60	13.00	10.60	13.00
100s/50s	0/0	0/0	0/0	0/0
Top score	30	16*	30	16*
Balls bowled	592	168	592	168
Wickets	18	8	18	8
Bowling average	32.94	27.75	32.94	27.75
5 wickets in innings	1	0	1	0
10 wickets in match	0	0	0	0
Best bowling	5/43	2/15	5/43	2/15
Catches/stumpings	7/–	2/–	7/–	2/–
- Source: Cricinfo, 21 February 2026

Shariz Ahmad (born 21 April 2003) is a Dutch cricketer. He has played for the Netherlands national cricket team since 2022. He is a right-arm leg spin bowler.

== Personal life ==
Ahmad was born in Amsterdam on 21 April 2003. He is the younger brother of fellow Netherlands international Musa Ahmed. Their father Nadeem Ahmad played top-level club cricket in the Netherlands after immigrating from Lahore, Pakistan, with he and his sons playing for Groen en Wit CC in Amsterdam.

== Junior career ==
In October 2020, Ahmad was named in the Dutch academy squad, following his performances at the under-18 level. The following September, he was part of the Dutch squad for the under-19 qualification matches in the Europe group for the 2022 ICC Under-19 Cricket World Cup. He was the leading wicket-taker for the Netherlands in the group.

== International career ==
In February 2022, Ahmad earned his maiden senior international call-up, after being named in the Dutch limited overs squads for their tour of New Zealand. In May 2022, he was named in the Dutch One Day International (ODI) squad for their series against the West Indies. He made his ODI debut on 2 June 2022, against the West Indies.

In July 2022, he was named in the Netherlands' Twenty20 International (T20I) squad for the 2022 ICC Men's T20 World Cup Global Qualifier B tournament in Zimbabwe. He made his T20I debut on 11 July 2022, against Papua New Guinea; although he went wicketless but conceded only 16 runs in his three overs. He was the Netherlands' best bowler in the 1st T20I against New Zealand, taking 2/15.

In March 2023, he was named in the Netherlands' ODI squad for their series against Zimbabwe. In the second ODI, on 23 March 2023, he took his maiden five-wicket haul in international cricket.
