= Clayton Floyd =

Dutch-South African cricketer (born 1996)

Personal information
- Full name: Clayton Floyd
- Born: 7 August 1996 (age 30); Cape Town, South Africa
- Batting: Right-handed
- Bowling: Slow left-arm orthodox
- Role: Batsman

International information
- National side: Netherlands
- ODI debut (cap 78): 25 January 2022 v Afghanistan
- Last ODI: 21 August 2024 v USA
- T20I debut (cap 48): 16 September 2019 v Scotland
- Last T20I: 5 August 2022 v New Zealand

Career statistics
Competition	ODI	T20I	LA	T20
Matches	10	4	10	4
Runs scored	14	24	14	24
Batting average	3.50	24.00	3.50	24.00
100s/50s	0/0	0/0	0/0	0/0
Top score	9	21	9	21
Balls bowled	426	66	426	66
Wickets	5	2	5	2
Bowling average	67.20	51.00	67.20	51.00
5 wickets in innings	0	0	0	0
10 wickets in match	0	0	0	0
Best bowling	2/41	1/14	2/41	1/14
Catches/stumpings	2/–	0/–	2/–	0/–
- Source: Cricinfo, 23 August 2024

Clayton Floyd (born 7 August 1996) is a Dutch-South African cricketer. In September 2019, he was named in the Netherlands' Twenty20 International (T20I) squad for the 2019–20 Ireland Tri-Nation Series. He made his T20I debut for the Netherlands, against Scotland, on 16 September 2019. In April 2020, he was one of seventeen Netherlands-based cricketers to be named in the team's senior squad.

In November 2021, Floyd was named in the Dutch One Day International (ODI) squad for their series against South Africa. In January 2022, Floyd was named in the Dutch ODI squad for their series against Afghanistan in Qatar. He made his ODI debut on 25 January 2022, against Afghanistan.
