= Brendon Bracewell =

New Zealand cricketer (born 1959)

Personal information
- Full name: Brendon Paul Bracewell
- Born: 14 September 1959 (age 67); Auckland, New Zealand
- Batting: Right-handed
- Bowling: Right-arm medium
- Role: Fast bowler
- Relatives: Mark Bracewell (brother); Michael Bracewell (nephew); Melanie Bracewell (niece); John Bracewell (brother); Douglas Bracewell (brother); Doug Bracewell (son)

International information
- National side: New Zealand (1978–1985)
- Test debut (cap 142): 27 July 1978 v England
- Last Test: 9 February 1985 v Pakistan
- Only ODI (cap 29): 17 July 1978 v England

Domestic team information
- Years: Team
- 1977/78–1979/80: Central Districts
- 1981/82–1982/83: Otago
- 1983/84–1989/90: Northern Districts

Career statistics
Competition	Test	ODI	FC	LA
Matches	6	1	77	28
Runs scored	24	0	965	134
Batting average	2.40	–	11.76	7.88
100s/50s	0/0	–	0/1	0/0
Top score	8	0*	57*	19
Balls bowled	1,036	66	12,081	1,345
Wickets	14	1	194	37
Bowling average	41.78	41.00	29.08	23.02
5 wickets in innings	0	0	2	0
10 wickets in match	0	0	0	0
Best bowling	3/110	1/41	6/49	3/22
Catches/stumpings	1/–	0/–	32/–	4/–
- Source: Cricinfo, 31 August 2016

Brendon Paul Bracewell (born 14 September 1959) is a former New Zealand Test cricketer. Born in Auckland, he is the younger brother of John Bracewell. He was educated at Tauranga Boys' College and was in the 1st XI from 1974 to 1978. He frequently suffered injuries throughout his playing career. Bracewell also played rugby for King Country and for Western Australia.

Bracewell operates Bracewell Cricket Academy, a private cricket coaching academy based in Napier. His son Doug Bracewell plays for Central Districts and the New Zealand cricket team.
