= Douglas Bracewell =

New Zealand cricketer (born 1953)

Personal information
- Full name: Douglas William Bracewell
- Born: 20 January 1953 (age 73); Auckland, New Zealand
- Batting: Right-handed
- Bowling: Right-arm offbreak
- Relatives: Michael Bracewell (nephew); Brendon Bracewell (brother); John Bracewell (brother); Mark Bracewell (brother); Doug Bracewell (nephew)

Domestic team information
- Years: Team
- 1973/74–1975/76: Canterbury
- 1976/77–1979/80: Central Districts
- FC debut: 3 January 1975 Canterbury v Northern Districts
- Last FC: 26 January 1980 Central Districts v Wellington
- LA debut: 2 December 1973 Canterbury v Otago
- Last LA: 6 March 1977 Central Districts v Auckland

Career statistics
Competition	First-class	List A
Matches	26	3
Runs scored	553	26
Batting average	17.28	8.66
100s/50s	0/2	0/0
Top score	56	26
Balls bowled	3,453	152
Wickets	43	2
Bowling average	36.23	38.00
5 wickets in innings	0	0
10 wickets in match	0	0
Best bowling	4/44	1/14
Catches/stumpings	14/–	1/–
- Source: CricInfo, 26 June 2025

Douglas William Bracewell (born 20 January 1953) is a New Zealand former cricketer who played first-class cricket for Central Districts and then Canterbury from 1973 until 1980.

A right-arm off-break bowler, and lower-order batsman, Bracewell came from a cricketing family, with brothers John and Brendon, and nephews Doug and Michael playing Test and One Day International cricket for New Zealand. Another brother Mark played first class cricket.

Bracewell himself made 26 first class appearances, taking 43 wickets at a bowling average of 36.23, and three List A appearances, taking two wickets. He also played Hawke Cup cricket for Wairarapa, helping them win the trophy in 1977 and hold it for two years.

Bracewell was also a rugby union player, representing Wairarapa Bush. He later coached rugby and cricket in the Wairarapa region for many years.
