= John Bracewell =

New Zealand cricketer

Personal information
- Full name: John Garry Bracewell
- Born: 15 April 1958 (age 68); Auckland, New Zealand
- Batting: Right-handed
- Bowling: Right arm off break
- Relatives: Brendon Bracewell (brother); Douglas Bracewell (brother); Mark Bracewell (brother); Doug Bracewell (nephew); Michael Bracewell (nephew); Melanie Bracewell (niece)

International information
- National side: New Zealand (1980–1990)
- Test debut (cap 147): 28 November 1980 v Australia
- Last Test: 10 July 1990 v England
- ODI debut (cap 46): 11 June 1983 v Pakistan
- Last ODI: 1 May 1990 v Pakistan

Domestic team information
- Years: Team
- 1981/82: Otago
- 1982/83–1989/90: Auckland

Head coaching information
- Years: Team
- 2003–2008: New Zealand
- 2015–2017: Ireland

Career statistics
Competition	Test	ODI	FC	LA
Matches	41	53	149	107
Runs scored	1,001	512	4,354	1,374
Batting average	20.42	16.51	25.91	20.20
100s/50s	1/4	0/0	4/21	0/3
Top score	110	43	110	66
Balls bowled	8,403	2,447	32,351	5,001
Wickets	102	33	522	90
Bowling average	35.81	57.09	26.66	35.23
5 wickets in innings	4	0	33	0
10 wickets in match	1	0	9	0
Best bowling	6/32	2/3	8/81	3/19
Catches/stumpings	31/–	19/–	125/–	40/–
- Source: Cricinfo, 26 April 2017

John Garry Bracewell (born 15 April 1958) is a former New Zealand cricketer who was most recently the coach of the Irish national team. He played 41 Test matches between 1980 and 1990, as well as 53 One Day Internationals. He was the second New Zealand cricketer to score 1000 runs and take 100 wickets in Test cricket.

He was the coach of the New Zealand cricket team between September 2003 and November 2008. His brother Brendon also played Test cricket, while his brothers Douglas and Mark played at first-class level. He was educated at Tauranga Boys' College and was in the 1st XI from 1973 to 1976. John Bracewell is the uncle of test representatives Doug Bracewell and Michael Bracewell.

== Playing career ==
Bracewell scored 1,001 runs in Tests, and 512 in ODI matches, with late-order hard-hitting right hand batting, and took 102 Test and 33 ODI wickets with his right-arm off-breaks. He holds the record for the longest ODI career without scoring a half-century or taking a three-wicket haul. His Test career included one century – 110 against England on 7 August 1986. He scored four first-class centuries in all as part of the 4,354 first class runs during a career for Auckland and Otago. He took 522 first class wickets.

John Bracewell still has the record for the most catches taken by a substitute fielder in an ODI innings with 4 and also the only substitute fielder to take 4 catches in an ODI.

== Coaching ==
Bracewell's approach to team selection has fallen under scrutiny during the 2006/2007 season. Despite levelling the home series with Sri Lanka two-all, New Zealand's top order batting has consistently displayed frailty, and this was most apparent after New Zealand compiled a dismal team total of 73 in one ODI during that series. Moreover, Bracewell has opted for a "rotation" policy within his squad for determining team selections, meaning the batting line-up has been shuffled consistently between successive ODIs. This has received criticism from local media who highlight that New Zealand Cricket is not currently afforded the luxury of a reserve pool of competitive international players, thus making the policy somewhat redundant.

Bracewell also controversially called Australian Fast-bowler Shaun Tait a 'chucker', and received a lot of criticism from the cricketing community. He also 'revealed' that Adam Gilchrist ducked out of the One-Day match in Hobart because of family issues, but shortly afterwards, Bracewell withdrew these comments and issued an official apology.

Bracewell was appointed head coach of the Ireland cricket team after the 2015 Cricket World Cup. He resigned in July 2017, having overseen the team at the 2016 ICC World Twenty20.

== Honours ==
In 1990, Bracewell was awarded the New Zealand 1990 Commemoration Medal.
