= The Cheap Seats =

News entertainment Australian TV series

- Genre: Comedy
- Written by: Melanie Bracewell; Tim McDonald
- Presented by: Melanie Bracewell; Tim McDonald
- Starring: Mel Tracina
- Country of origin: Australia
- Original language: English
- No. of seasons: 6
- No. of episodes: 147

Production
- Executive producers: Debra Herman; Michael Hirsh; Rob Sitch; Tom Gleisner; Santo Cilauro
- Camera setup: Multi-camera
- Running time: 60 minutes (including commercials)
- Production company: Working Dog Productions

Original release
- Network: Network 10
- Release: 20 July 2021 – present

Related
- Have You Been Paying Attention?

The Cheap Seats is an Australian comedy panel television show on Network 10, which premiered on 20 July 2021. The Cheap Seats features selected clips of the previous week's news and television shows accompanied with humorous commentary delivered by the hosts, Melanie Bracewell and Tim McDonald. The show returned for a second season on 26 April 2022, and a third season on 9 May 2023. Season 4 premiered on 30 April 2024, and Season 5 premiered on 29 April 2025. The show returned for a sixth season on 21 April 2026.

== Hosts ==
The Cheap Seats is hosted by Melanie Bracewell and Tim McDonald. Segments are co-hosted by presenters including Mel Tracina on entertainment and Titus O'Reily on sport, however since May 2023, O'Reily left the show for other projects and has been replaced with different guests doing the sport segment instead.

== Recurring segments ==
- Entertainment: Mel Tracina talks about events which occurred in entertainment during the week.
- Sport: Rotating guests, formerly including correspondent Titus O'Reily, talk about events that occurred in sport during the week.
- Across the Ditch: Unusual news from New Zealand mainly presented by Bracewell.
- Archipelago of Love Islands: Tracina shares the funniest moments from versions of various island dating shows, such as Love Island, FBoy Island and Stranded on Honeymoon Island.
- What's on What's on in the Warehouse: The hosts comment on out of context clips from the show What's on in the Warehouse, created by Australian pharmacy chain Chemist Warehouse to promote its products.
- Pacific Update Update: The hosts comment on clips from the TVNZ news show, Pacific Update.
- Crop This!: Unusual tidbits from the world of gardening, usually featuring reports by Seven News reporter Penny McKinlay.
- Mel's Markets: Bracewell shows funny news relating to the financial market.
- Timfomercials: McDonald shows clips on different infomercials showed out of context.
- Pencil It In: The hosts highlight strange and unusual events taking place across Australia.
- Crime Time: Lighthearted and funny clips of minor crimes across Australia.
- House of Bracewellness: Bracewell shows clips from the Seven Network lifestyle show, House of Wellness.
- Reporter of the Week: Introduced in 2023, Bracewell and McDonald recognise a reporter who has been funny, surprising, or overly dedicated in the past week.
- Regional Roundup: The hosts highlight unusual news and events that are taking place in regional towns around Australia.

== Episodes ==
Season	Episodes	Originally released	
Season	Episodes	First released	Last released
1	19	20 July 2021	23 November 2021
2	30	26 April 2022	15 November 2022
3	30	9 May 2023	28 November 2023
4	30	30 April 2024	19 November 2024
5	30	29 April 2025	18 November 2025
6	TBA	21 April 2026	TBA

=== Season 1 (2021) ===
No. overall	No. in season	Guest(s)	Original release date	Australian viewers
1	1	Natasha Exelby	20 July 2021	460,000
2	2	Angella Dravid	27 July 2021	286,000
3	3	Josh Earl & Ruby Tui	3 August 2021	255,000
4	4	Harry Garside	10 August 2021	313,000
5	5	Rachel Fairburn & Kez McGee	17 August 2021	325,000
6	6	Urzila Carlson	24 August 2021	321,000
7	7	Dilruk Jayasinha	31 August 2021	348,000
8	8	Marie Chandler & Lloyd Langford	7 September 2021	305,000
9	9	Osher Günsberg	14 September 2021	324,000
10	10	Chas Licciardello	21 September 2021	358,000
11	11	Dave Hughes	28 September 2021	326,000
12	12	Lana Murphy & Tony Martin	5 October 2021	370,000
13	13	Nina Oyama & Nath Valvo	12 October 2021	330,000
14	14	Chloë McCardel & Nate Byrne	19 October 2021	368,000
15	15	Archie Thompson	26 October 2021	358,000
16	16	Naomi Higgins	2 November 2021	402,000
17	17	Laura McGoldrick	9 November 2021	391,000
18	18	Myf Warhurst	16 November 2021	358,000
19	19	Natasha Exelby	23 November 2021	361,000

=== Season 2 (2022) ===
No. overall	No. in season	Guest(s)	Original release date	Australian viewers
20	1	Nath Valvo	26 April 2022	342,000
21	2	Denise Scott & Jarrod James Bingham	3 May 2022	340,000
22	3	Dilruk Jayasinha	10 May 2022	360,000
23	4	Ash London	17 May 2022	378,000
24	5	Alex Dyson	24 May 2022	325,000
25	6	Archie Thompson	31 May 2022	360,000
26	7	Adam Bandt	7 June 2022	394,000
27	8	Ryan Moloney	14 June 2022	383,000
28	9	Tony Martin	21 June 2022	429,000
29	10	Gen Fricker	28 June 2022	414,000
30	11	Costa Georgiadis	5 July 2022	387,000
Note: Emma Holland replaced Tim McDonald as host.
31	12	Felicity Ward	12 July 2022	396,000
32	13	Matt Agnew	19 July 2022	396,000
33	14	Karla Lopez	26 July 2022	395,000
34	15	Nicole Livingstone	2 August 2022	357,000
35	16	Maeve Plouffe & Sam Garlepp	9 August 2022	387,000
36	17	Abbie Chatfield & Sam Garlepp	16 August 2022	386,000
37	18	Ray O'Leary & Shane "Stone Cold" Van Styn	23 August 2022	357,000
38	19	Osher Günsberg	30 August 2022	268,000
39	20	Myf Warhurst & Beth Lee-Crowther	6 September 2022	290,000
40	21	Nazeem Hussain	13 September 2022	332,000
41	22	–	20 September 2022	291,000
42	23	Jonathan Van Ness	27 September 2022	301,000
43	24	Concetta Caristo & Adam Rozenbachs	4 October 2022	330,000
44	25	Adam Rozenbachs & Daniel Doody	11 October 2022	332,000
45	26	Bill Bailey & Jo Weston	18 October 2022	319,000
46	27	Rob Mills	25 October 2022	318,000
47	28	Michael Hing	1 November 2022	338,000
48	29	Dane Simpson	8 November 2022	324,000
49	30	Sam Pang	15 November 2022	343,000

=== Season 3 (2023) ===
No. overall	No. in season	Guest(s)	Original release date	Australian viewers
50	1	Sheldon Riley	9 May 2023	365,000
51	2	Mel Buttle	16 May 2023	399,000
52	3	Miguel Maestre	23 May 2023	384,000
Titus O’Reilly presented as sports correspondent for the last time, he wasn’t replaced and rotating guests, comedians or the hosts presented the sports segment since then.
53	4	Gina Chick, Archie Thompson	30 May 2023	388,000
Archie Thompson
54	5	Susie Youssef	6 June 2023	379,000
Sports segment: James Colley
55	6	Celia Pacquola	13 June 2023	395,000
Sports segment: Ed Kavalee
56	7	Santo Cilauro & Natalie Tran	20 June 2023	351,000
Sports segment: Georgie Tunny
57	8	Bridget Hustwaite	27 June 2023	357,000
Sports segment: Adam Rozenbachs
58	9	Tom Cashman	4 July 2023	375,000
Sports segment: Anthony "Lehmo" Lehmann
59	10	Robert Irwin & Zachary Ruane	11 July 2023	340,000
60	11	David Craig & Barbie cast (Margot Robbie, Greta Gerwig, Issa Rae & America Ferrera)	18 July 2023	352,000
Sports segment: Adam Rozenbachs
61	12	Aesha Scott	25 July 2023	328,000
Sports segment: Ben Lomas
62	13	Matt Agnew, Damien Fleming	1 August 2023	386,000
Note: Emma Holland replaced Melanie Bracewell as host of episodes 12 and 13 due to the latter performing at the Just for Laughs comedy festival in Montreal, however Bracewell made a cameo appearance in episode 13 via satellite.
63	14	Tara Rushton & Jo Weston	8 August 2023	265,000
Sports segment: Adam Rozenbachs
64	15	Annie Louie & Amy Chapman	15 August 2023	317,000
65	16	Adam Liaw & Miguel Maestre	22 August 2023	282,000
Sports segment: Adam Rozenbachs
66	17	Chas Licciardello	29 August 2023	293,000
Sports segment: Adam Rozenbachs
67	18	Leigh Sales	5 September 2023	340,000
Sports segment: Anthony "Lehmo" Lehmann
68	19	Ray O'Leary	12 September 2023	330,000
Sports segment: Georgie Tunny
69	20	Anthony Albanese & Concetta Caristo	19 September 2023	306,000
70	21	Nath Valvo	26 September 2023	325,000
Note: Emma Holland replaced Tim McDonald as host; Sports segment: Ed Kavalee
71	22	Dylan Alcott	3 October 2023	310,000
Note: Emma Holland replaced Tim McDonald as host; Sports segment: Adam Rozenbachs
72	23	Costa Georgiadis	10 October 2023	291,000
Sports segment: Lizzy Hoo
73	24	Rhys Nicholson	17 October 2023	335,000
Sports segment: Max Rushden
74	25	Murray Cook &Lydia Lassila	24 October 2023	371,000
75	26	Cameron James	31 October 2023	350,000
Sports segment: Merrick Watts
76	27	Phil Wang & Catherine Cohen	7 November 2023	368,000
77	28	Richard Osman	14 November 2023	348,000
78	29	Anna Polyviou	21 November 2023	339,000
Sports segment: Adam Rozenbach
79	30	Andy Lee	28 November 2023	350,000

=== Season 4 (2024) ===
No. overall	No. in season	Guest(s)	Original release date	Australian viewers
80	1	Joel Creasey	30 April 2024	450,000
Sports segment: Adam Rozenbachs
81	2	Bron Lewis	7 May 2024	465,000
Sports segment: Bianca Chatfield
82	3	Poh Ling Yeow	14 May 2024	508,000
Sports segment: Anthony "Lehmo" Lehmann
83	4	Andrea Crothers	21 May 2024	492,000
Sports segment: Merrick Watts
84	5	Myf Warhurst	28 May 2024	532,000
Sports segment: Adam Rozenbachs
85	6	Jimmy Barnes	4 June 2024	540,000
Sports segment: Tara Rushton
86	7	Jenny Tian	11 June 2024	489,000
Sports segment: Adam Rozenbachs
87	8	Alexa Leary & Damien Fleming	18 June 2024	534,000
88	9	Luke McGregor	25 June 2024	531,000
Sports segment: Georgie Tunny
89	10	Tony Armstrong	2 July 2024	499,000
Sports segment: Adam Rozenbachs
90	11	Anna Meares & Lana Walters	9 July 2024	448,000
91	12	Miguel Maestre	16 July 2024	461,000
Sports segment: Ben Lomas
92	13	Urvi Majumdar	23 July 2024	448,000
Sports segment: Broden Kelly
93	14	Angela Bishop & Emily Seebohm	30 July 2024	303,000
Note: Mel Tracina replaced Melanie Bracewell as co-host; Sports segment: Adam Rozenbachs
94	15	Steven Quartermain & Nicolette Minister	6 August 2024	293,000
Note: Mel Tracina replaced Melanie Bracewell as co-host; Sports segment: Anthony "Lehmo" Lehmann
95	16	Ray Martin & Andrea Crothers	13 August 2024	466,000
Note: Georgie Tunny replaced Melanie Bracewell as co-host.
96	17	Hamish Blake, Nina Kennedy & Matthew Denny	20 August 2024	442,000
Note: Julia Zemiro replaced Melanie Bracewell as co-host.
97	18	Larry Emdur & Bron Lewis	27 August 2024	462,000
Note: Celia Pacquola replaced Melanie Bracewell as co-host; Sports segment: Adam Rozenbachs
98	19	Ray O'Leary & Sharyn Ghidella	3 September 2024	399,000
99	20	Daria Saville	10 September 2024	462,000
Sports segment: Adam Rozenbachs
100	21	Allan Raskall	17 September 2024	416,000
101	22	Tim Minchin	24 September 2024	422,000
Sports segment: Broden Kelly
102	23	Romesh Ranganathan	1 October 2024	431,000
Sports segment: Lavender Baj
103	24	David M. Green	8 October 2024	420,000
Sports segment: Adam Rozenbachs
104	25	Andrea Crothers	15 October 2024	429,000
Sports segment: Bobby Macumber
105	26	Bill Bailey	22 October 2024	393,000
106	27	Stephen Fry & Saya Sakakibara	29 October 2024	472,000
107	28	Eric Idle	5 November 2024	403,000
Sports segment: Adam Rozenbachs
108	29	Merrick Watts	12 November 2024	397,000
109	30	Tom Gleisner & Louise Mahler	19 November 2024	436,000

=== Season 5 (2025) ===
No. overall	No. in season	Guest(s)	Original release date	Australian viewers
110	1	Anne Edmonds	29 April 2025	475,000
Sports segment: Chloe Petts
111	2	Santo Cilauro, Mike Goldstein	6 May 2025	481,000
112	3	Antony Green, Danny Estrin	13 May 2025	489,000
113	4	Celya AB	20 May 2025	469,000
Sports segment: Adam Rozenbachs
114	5	Danny and Michael Philippou, Jamie Durie	27 May 2025	458,000
Sports segment: Luke Rocca
115	6	George Kapiniaris, Andy Allen, Emma Holland	3 June 2025	490,000
116	7	Eddie Perfect	10 June 2025	504,000
Sports segment: Alex Ward
117	8	Joanne Ciconte, Guy Montgomery	17 June 2025	479,000
118	9	Demi Adejuyigbe	24 June 2025	452,000
Sports segment: Abbey Gelmi
119	10	Lisa Millar	1 July 2025	477,000
Sports segment: Dave Thornton
120	11	Takashi Wakasugi	8 July 2025	493,000
Sports segment: Broden Kelly
121	12	Ray O'Leary, Steph Baumgartel	15 July 2025	516,000
Sports segment: Abbey Gelmi
122	13	Lana Walters	22 July 2025	502,000
Sports segment: Peter Helliar
123	14	Lynne McGranger	29 July 2025	509,000
Sports segment: Ben Lomas
124	15	Sandra Sully, Jo Weston	5 August 2025	509,000
125	16	Miguel Maestre	12 August 2025	403,000
Note: Nath Valvo replaced Tim McDonald as co-host; Sports segment: Georgie Tunny
126	17	Bianca Chatfield	19 August 2025	441,000
Sports segment: Andrea Crothers
127	18	Nevaeh-Lea Benton	26 August 2025	407,000
Sports segment: Adam Rozenbachs
128	19	Alexei Toliopoulos	2 September 2025	467,000
Sports segment: Abbey Gelmi
129	20	Matt Keenan, Hannah Ferguson	9 September 2025	445,000
130	21	Angela Bishop, Sam Garlepp, Craig Maher	16 September 2025	450,000
Note: Mel Tracina replaced Melanie Bracewell as co-host
131	22	Nikki Webster, Chris Koehler	23 September 2025	429,000
Sports segment: Peter Helliar; Note: Mel Tracina replaced Melanie Bracewell as co-host
132	23	Peter Murphy, Tom Walker	30 September 2025	411,000
133	24	Rob Beckett	7 October 2025	442,000
134	25	Rove McManus, Marcos Ambrose, Tabitha Ambrose	14 October 2025	488,000
135	26	Geraldine Hickey	21 October 2025	385,000
136	27	Ben Elton, Rob Thomas, Ryan Shelton	28 October 2025	404,000
137	28	Julia Zemiro	4 November 2025	389,000
Note: Carlo Ritchie replaced Tim McDonald as co-host; Sports segment: Adam Rozenbachs
138	29	Reggie Watts	11 November 2025	477,000
Note: Carlo Ritchie replaced Tim McDonald; Sports segment: Abbey Gelmi
139	30	Anthony Albanese, Nevaeh-Lea Benton	18 November 2025	436,000

=== Season 6 (2026) ===
No. overall	No. in season	Guest(s)	Original release date	Australian viewers
140	1	Denise Scott, Emmanuel Sonubi	21 April 2026	N/A
141	2	Celia Pacquola, Josh Jack	28 April 2026	N/A
142	3	Glenn Robbins	5 May 2026	N/A
143	4	Anne Edmonds, Abbey Gelmi	12 May 2026	N/A
144	5	Shaun Micallef, Clint Stanaway	19 May 2026	N/A
145	6	Anisa Nandaula	26 May 2026	N/A
146	7	Concetta Caristo, Matt Keenan	2 June 2026	N/A
147	8	Bianca Adler, Granny Bingo (Thomas Jaspers and Kyle Minall)	9 June 2026	N/A
148	9	Santo Cilauro, Ed Kavalee, Dave Thornton	16 June 2026	N/A
149	10	Elouise Eftos	23 June 2026	N/A
150	11	Anthony Field, Lucia Field, Joseph McGrail Bateup	30 June 2026	N/A
151	12	Emma Holland	7 July 2026	N/A
152	13	Alex Papps	14 July 2026	N/A
153	14	Miguel Maestre, Alexei Toliopoulos	21 July 2026	N/A
154	15	Broden Kelly, Rob Sitch	28 July 2026	N/A
155	16	Annabel Crabb	4 August 2026	N/A
156	17	Danielle Walker, Gold Logie Nominees	11 August 2026	N/A
157	18	Roy and HG, Sam Pang	18 August 2026	N/A
158	19	Carlo Ritchie, Paul Williams	25 August 2026	N/A

== Awards and nominations ==
Year	Award	Category	Nominee(s)	Result	Ref.
2022	Logie Awards of 2022	Most Popular New Talent	Melanie Bracewell	Nominated	
2022	Logie Awards of 2022	Most Popular Comedy Program	The Cheap Seats	Nominated	
2023	Logie Awards of 2023	Most Outstanding Entertainment Program	The Cheap Seats	Won	
2026	Logie Awards of 2026	Best Comedy Entertainment Program	The Cheap Seats	Nominated	
