= Michael Bracewell (cricketer) =

New Zealander cricketer (born 1991)

Personal information
- Full name: Michael Gordon Bracewell
- Born: 14 February 1991 (age 35); Masterton, New Zealand
- Batting: Left-handed
- Bowling: Right-arm off break
- Role: Batting all-rounder
- Relatives: Mark Bracewell (father); Brendon Bracewell (uncle); John Bracewell (uncle); Douglas Bracewell (uncle); Doug Bracewell (cousin); Melanie Bracewell (cousin)

International information
- National side: New Zealand (2022–present)
- Test debut (cap 283): 10 June 2022 v England
- Last Test: 2 December 2025 v West Indies
- ODI debut (cap 201): 29 March 2022 v Netherlands
- Last ODI: 15 November 2026 v India
- ODI shirt no.: 4
- T20I debut (cap 92): 18 July 2022 v Ireland
- Last T20I: 1 November 2026 v India
- T20I shirt no.: 4

Domestic team information
- Years: Team
- 2026: Amsterdam Flames
- 2026/27: Melbourne Renegades

Career statistics
Competition	Test	ODI	T20I	FC
Matches	10	50	52	109
Runs scored	339	1,076	516	5,679
Batting average	21.18	34.70	22.43	31.90
100s/50s	0/1	2/3	0/3	11/23
Top score	74*	140	61*	190
Balls bowled	1,995	2,008	695	5,005
Wickets	25	47	37	68
Bowling average	47.92	34.72	24.67	41.69
5 wickets in innings	0	0	0	3
10 wickets in match	0	0	0	0
Best bowling	4/75	4/26	3/5	8/41
Catches/stumpings	14/–	34/–	28/–	111/–
Medal record
Men's Cricket
Representing New Zealand
ICC Champions Trophy
Runner-up	2025 Pakistan
- Source: Cricinfo, 15 November 2026

Michael Gordon Bracewell (born 14 February 1991) is a New Zealand cricketer who plays for Wellington. He is the nephew of former Test players Brendon and John Bracewell, and the cousin of current international player Doug Bracewell and comedian Melanie Bracewell. He attended Kavanagh College in Dunedin. He made his international debut for the New Zealand cricket team in March 2022.

== Career ==
In June 2018, he was awarded a contract with Wellington for the 2018–19 season. In March 2020, in round six of the 2019–20 Plunket Shield season, Bracewell took his maiden five-wicket haul in first-class cricket.

In June 2020, he was offered a contract by Wellington ahead of the 2020–21 domestic cricket season. On 8 January 2022, in the 2021–22 Super Smash tournament, Bracewell scored 141 not out for the Wellington Firebirds against the Central Stags. It was the highest score in a Twenty20 cricket match in New Zealand.

In March 2022, Bracewell was named in New Zealand's One Day International (ODI) and Twenty20 International (T20I) squads for their home series against the Netherlands. He made his ODI debut on 29 March 2022, for New Zealand against the Netherlands. In May 2022, Bracewell was named in New Zealand's Test squad for their tour of England. He made his Test debut on 10 June 2022, for New Zealand against England.

In July 2022, in the first match of the series against Ireland, Bracewell scored his first century in ODI cricket. Bracewell made his T20I debut on 18 July 2022, for New Zealand against Ireland. Two days later, in the next match of the series against Ireland, Bracewell took his first hat-trick in T20I cricket in the first over he bowled in an international match.

In January 2023, Bracewell scored third fastest century for New Zealand in ODI cricket while batting in the first match of the series against India. He also equalled MS Dhoni record of being the only batter to score more than one century while batting at number seven or below.

For IPL 2023, he was signed as a replacement for injured Will Jacks in the Royal Challengers Bangalore team.

In May 2024, he was named in New Zealand’s squad for the 2024 ICC Men's T20 World Cup tournament.

In February 2025, he was named in New Zealand's squad for the 2025 Champions Trophy in Pakistan.
