= Tim McDonald (comedian) =

Australian comedian

- Born: 24 July 1993 (age 33); Australia
- Education: St Kevin's College, Melbourne
- Alma mater: University of Melbourne
- Occupations: Comedian; radio host; television host; podcaster
- Employer: Network 10
- Known for: The Cheap Seats; The Reserve Drivers

Comedy career
- Years active: 2016–present
- Medium: Television; Radio; Podcasts

Tim McDonald (born 24 July 1993) is an Australian comedian, radio and television host and podcaster. He is best known for his regular guest appearances on the Australian comedy news quiz show Have You Been Paying Attention? and more recently as the co-host of The Cheap Seats with comedian and actress Melanie Bracewell. Both of these series are produced by Working Dog Productions and are a mix of news and comedy. McDonald was named among Radio Today's Top New Talent to Watch in 2019.

== Television ==
Since 2019, McDonald has been a regular guest on Network 10's show Have You Been Paying Attention?, in which the host Tom Gleisner quizzes guests on the top news stories of the week.

McDonald also co-hosts and writes a show by Network 10 and Working Dog Productions, The Cheap Seats, alongside New Zealand comedian Melanie Bracewell. The Cheap Seats debuted in 2021 and takes a comedic look over the week's news, entertainment and sport. In the ratings, The Cheap Seats is sitting in the top 20 among the 25-54 year-old age group as of August 2021.

McDonald has also worked behind the scenes in a number of Working Dog Productions. He was the social media producer for Utopia, a Logie Award-winning Australian television comedy series on the ABC.

== Radio ==
McDonald and Sam Garlepp hosted a Triple M show entitled The Smoko in 2019, running on Wednesdays from 12–2pm. This opportunity arose through the SCA Hubble program, following the success of the Tim & Sammy podcast. Radio Today described The Smoko as "the perfect mix of satire, observational humour and fake callers".

McDonald and Garlepp also hosted The Sunday Experiment, in 2019, running on Sundays from 8–10pm on Australia's Hit Network.

In 2019, McDonald and Garlepp were named in Radio Today's Top New Talent to Watch.

McDonald was also a regular guest on the Marty Sheargold Show, an Australian breakfast radio show on Triple M throughout 2021.

== Podcasts ==
McDonald is the co-host of The Reserve Drivers podcast alongside Luke Rocca. The podcast is a comedic take on Formula One.
