= Musa Ahmed =

Dutch cricketer (born 1997)

Personal information
- Full name: Musa Nadeem Ahmed
- Born: 10 December 1997 (age 28); Lahore, Punjab Pakistan
- Batting: Left-handed
- Bowling: Right-arm leg break
- Role: Batsman
- Relatives: Shariz Ahmad (brother)

International information
- National side: Netherlands
- ODI debut (cap 74): 7 June 2021 v Ireland
- Last ODI: 21 August 2024 v USA

Career statistics
Competition	ODI	List A
Matches	15	17
Runs scored	255	284
Batting average	17.00	16.70
100s/50s	0/1	0/1
Top score	61	61
Catches/stumpings	5/–	5/–
- Source: Cricinfo, 23 August 2024

Musa Nadeem Ahmed (born 10 December 1997) is a Dutch cricketer who plays for the Netherlands national cricket team. In October 2020, he was part of the Dutch Academy squad. In May 2021, he was named in the Netherlands A team for their tour of Ireland to play the Ireland Wolves. He made his List A debut on 10 May 2021, for the Netherlands A cricket team against the Ireland Wolves. Later the same month, he was named in the Netherlands' One Day International (ODI) squad for their three-match against Ireland. On his selection for the ODI series, the Dutch team coach Ryan Campbell praised Ahmed's performance in the Topklasse competition and his hard work during the enforced international break due to the COVID-19 pandemic. He made his ODI debut on 7 June 2021 against Ireland.

== Personal life ==
Ahmed is the older brother of fellow Dutch international Shariz Ahmad. Their father Nadeem Ahmad immigrated to the Netherlands from Lahore, Pakistan.
