= Doug Bracewell =

New Zealand cricketer (born 1990)

Personal information
- Full name: Douglas Andrew John Bracewell
- Born: 28 September 1990 (age 36); Tauranga, New Zealand
- Batting: Right-handed
- Bowling: Right-arm medium-fast
- Role: Bowling all-rounder
- Relatives: Brendon Bracewell (father); John Bracewell (uncle); Mark Bracewell (uncle); Douglas Bracewell (uncle); Michael Bracewell (cousin); Melanie Bracewell (cousin)

International information
- National side: New Zealand (2011–2023)
- Test debut (cap 251): 1 November 2011 v Zimbabwe
- Last Test: 17 March 2023 v Sri Lanka
- ODI debut (cap 165): 20 October 2011 v Zimbabwe
- Last ODI: 4 April 2022 v Netherlands
- ODI shirt no.: 34
- T20I debut (cap 48): 15 October 2011 v Zimbabwe
- Last T20I: 3 September 2021 v Bangladesh
- T20I shirt no.: 34

Domestic team information
- Years: Team
- 2008/09–2023/24: Central Districts
- 2012: Delhi Daredevils
- 2018–2019: Northamptonshire
- 2023, 2025: Essex
- 2023/24: Joburg Super Kings

Career statistics
Competition	Test	ODI	T20I	FC
Matches	28	21	20	137
Runs scored	568	221	126	4,505
Batting average	13.85	18.41	21.00	25.45
100s/50s	0/0	0/1	0/0	3/24
Top score	47	57	44	105
Balls bowled	5,164	1,016	310	23,974
Wickets	74	26	20	422
Bowling average	38.82	32.50	23.50	31.08
5 wickets in innings	2	0	0	11
10 wickets in match	0	0	0	0
Best bowling	6/40	4/55	3/25	7/35
Catches/stumpings	11/-	5/–	7/–	61/–
- Source: ESPNcricinfo, 29 December 2025

Douglas Andrew John Bracewell (born 28 September 1990) is a former New Zealand cricketer. A right-handed batsman and right-arm fast-medium pace bowler, he played for New Zealand between 2011 and 2023. He is the son of former Test cricketer Brendon Bracewell. His uncle, John Bracewell, is also a former Black Caps player and coach.

== Early days ==
Born in Tauranga, Bracewell was educated at Rathkeale College near Masterton.

== Domestic career ==
In 2008, Bracewell was selected in the New Zealand under-19 squad for their tour of England, he played both ‘Tests’ and five ‘ODIs’.

On 17 November 2008 he made his first-class cricket debut for Central Districts against Auckland, he was dismissed for a duck in the first innings before taking 1 wicket for 41 runs (1/41). A month later he made his List A debut against the same opposition, he took 2/33 and as opening batsman scored 55.

After making his international debuts in all three formats during the 2011–12 season Bracewell was drafted by Delhi Daredevils in the 2012 IPL draft.

In June 2018, he was awarded a contract with Central Districts for the 2018–19 season.

Bracewell signed to play for Essex in the 2023 County Championship, he made eight appearances and took 24 wickets at 27.41.

In 2024, Bracewell received a one-month anti-doping ban for testing positive to cocaine on match day of a Super Smash match, playing for Central Stags against Wellington Firebirds.

Bracewell returned to Essex for their final three County Championship matches of the 2025 season. Bracewell again failed a drugs test on 25 September 2025, on the second day of his final match for Essex, and admitted using cocaine after the end of the first day's play. He was given a two year ban by the ECB's Cricket Regulator on 24 April 2026.

== International career ==
Bracewell made his Test debut against Zimbabwe in November 2011, and took 5/85 in the second innings. Bracewell became the seventh New Zealand bowler to pick up a five-wicket haul on Test debut. It is also the fifth five-wicket haul by a bowler making his debut against Zimbabwe.

In a Test match against Australia at Bellerive Oval, Hobart Bracewell ran through the Australian batting line-up and took figures of 6/40 in only his third Test, the best bowling by a New Zealander in Tests in nearly 5 years. He bowled Nathan Lyon to seal the win by 7 runs. It was also 26 years since New Zealand last won a Test match in Australia.

Having not played internationally since October 2016 due to injuries and drink-driving charges, he was picked for the first match of the ODI series against West Indies as Colin de Grandhomme returned to Zimbabwe on family bereavement leave. In the first ODI against West Indies, he took 4 wickets in that match by restricting them below 250. New Zealand finally won that match by 5 wickets and Bracewell was awarded man of the match for his match winning performance.

Bracewell announced his retirement from all cricket in December 2025.

== See also ==
- List of New Zealand cricketers who have taken five-wicket hauls on Test debut
