= Melanie Bracewell =

New Zealand comedian and scriptwriter (born 1995)

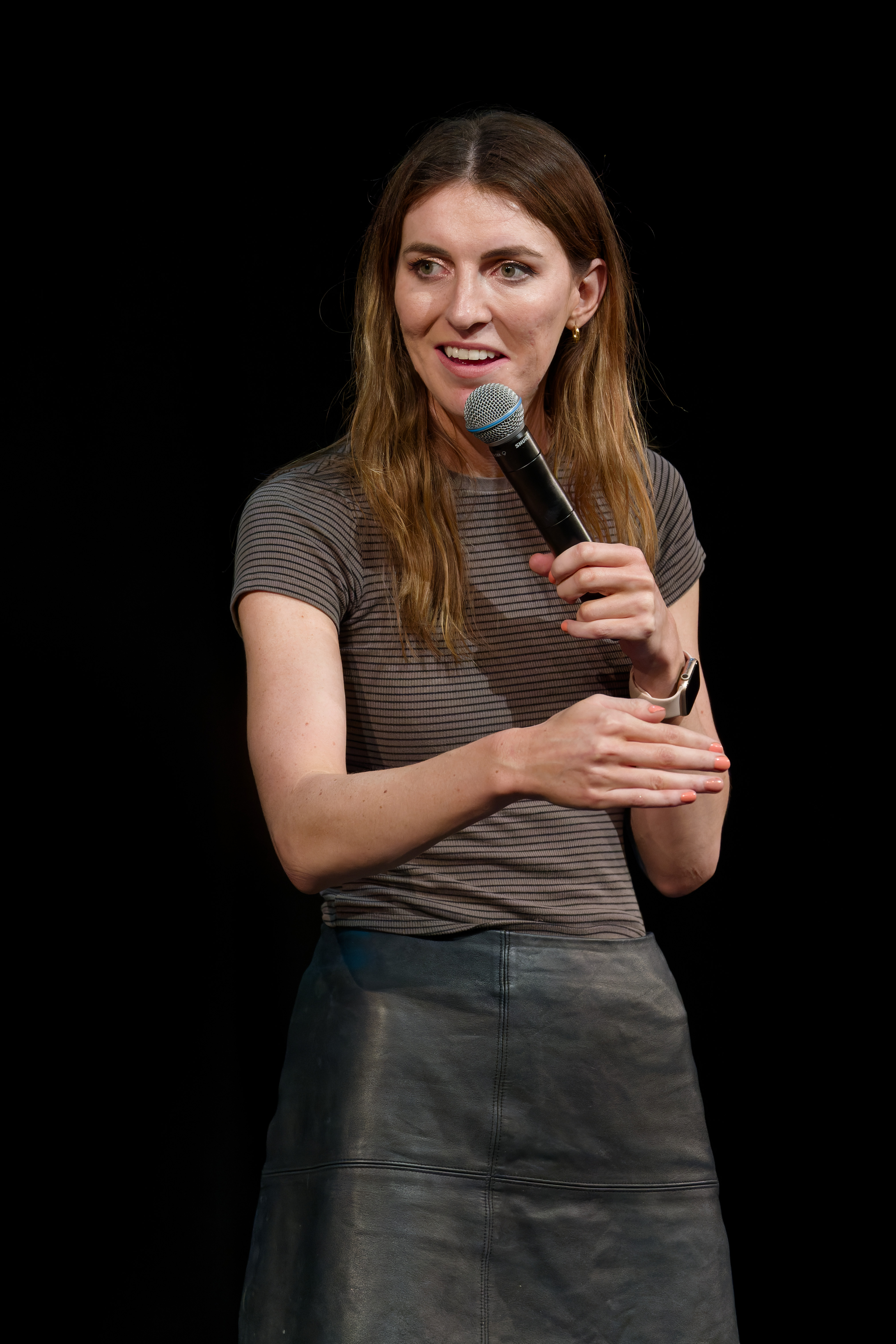
- Bracewell at the 2024 Edinburgh Festival Fringe
- Born: Melissa Rita Bracewell (Note: Bracewell revealed in season 6, episode 11 of The Cheap Seats (aired 30 June 2026 in Australia) that her parents had named her "Melissa" at birth; they subsequently changed her given name to "Melanie" when she was three days old.); 19 July 1995 (age 31); Beach Haven, Auckland, New Zealand
- Employer: MediaWorks New Zealand
- Awards: Billy T Award (2018)
- Notable work: The Cheap Seats
- Relatives: John Bracewell (uncle); Brendon Bracewell (uncle); Doug Bracewell (cousin); Michael Bracewell (cousin)

Comedy career
- Years active: 2014–present
- Medium: Stand-up; Television; Radio; Impressions
- Website: melaniebracewell.com

Melanie Rita Bracewell (born Melissa Bracewell; 19 July 1995) is a New Zealand comedian, actress, and scriptwriter. In 2018, Bracewell won New Zealand's Billy T Award. She has hosted The Cheap Seats on Network 10 in Australia since its debut in 2021, and was a contestant on the fourth series of Taskmaster NZ.

== Early life and education ==
Bracewell was born on 19 July 1995. She grew up in Beach Haven in Auckland's North Shore, and is a niece of Test cricketers John Bracewell and Brendon Bracewell.

Bracewell attended Birkenhead College, serving as deputy head girl, then studied Communication and Media Studies at the University of Auckland.

Bracewell became interested in comedy as a child and, as a teenager, wrote a comedic blog.

== Career ==
Bracewell worked as producer of the breakfast show on Radio Hauraki and appeared as a contestant on the Australian TV quiz show Have You Been Paying Attention? She co-hosts the Australian comedy television show The Cheap Seats alongside Tim McDonald.

In 2019, Bracewell began writing for the TV show The Project in New Zealand. She has also written for the series Wellington Paranormal.

In 2020, Bracewell received international coverage when videos and photos of her impersonating Prime Minister Jacinda Ardern went viral. Ardern responded with: "You do my makeup better than I do." Bracewell and Ardern later met and posted a TikTok video while Bracewell was dressed as Ardern.

In 2020, Bracewell starred as Karen in The Eggplant, a New Zealand teen drama crime-comedy series released to TVNZ OnDemand and YouTube.

Bracewell appeared on the panel show Patriot Brains in 2021.

In 2023, Bracewell and Ray O'Leary hosted one episode of the podcast Bananapod before it went into hiatus. O'Leary later revealed that the podcast was a task for Taskmaster NZ, which is why no further podcasts were released.

In September 2025, Bracewell appeared as a contestant on the UK gameshow Richard Osman's House of Games, finishing 2nd in each of the 5 episodes as well as overall.

== Controversy ==
In 2019, Bracewell shared a screenshot on her Twitter account of a sexually explicit message which she said had come unprompted from someone in the Reddit cricketing community. A Reddit user later found a post from Bracewell in a subreddit soliciting sexual messages. A moderator from the Reddit cricketing community then contacted Bracewell asking her for details of who sent her the private message. She subsequently apologised and admitted her post was a joke. After her apology, she received criticism on social media with some accusing her of lying about sexual harassment and stereotyping Indians.

== Recognition ==
In 2014, Bracewell won 7 Days Comedy Apprentice; the following year she won the Raw Comedy Quest and in 2016 won Best Auckland Newcomer at the New Zealand International Comedy Festival.

In 2018, Bracewell received the Billy T Award for the country's best emerging comedian. The same year she won Breakthrough Comedian of the Year at the NZ Comedy Guild Awards.

In 2019, she was short-listed for the Kevin Smith Memorial Cup for Outstanding Artist Achievement, Best Female Comedian and Bizarre Moment of the Year at the New Zealand Comedy Guild Awards.
