= 2024 Men's T20 World Cup squads =

The 2024 ICC Men's T20 World Cup was the ninth edition of the ICC Men's T20 World Cup, a biennial world cup for cricket in Twenty20 International (T20I) format, organized by the International Cricket Council (ICC). It was co-hosted by Cricket West Indies and USA Cricket from 1 to 29 June 2024. It was the first major ICC tournament to include matches played in the United States. The West Indies had previously hosted the 2010 competition. A total of twenty teams competed in 55 matches across six venues in the West Indies, and three in the United States. Each team was allowed to have a squad of 15 players with the provisional squad required to be submitted to the ICC by 1 May 2024. The teams were allowed to make changes to their squads till 25 May 2024.

On 29 April 2024, New Zealand was the first team to announce its squad for the tournament. The following day, Afghanistan, England, India, Oman and South Africa announced their squads; followed by Australia and Nepal on 1 May; Canada on 2 May; the co-hosts the West Indies and the United States on 3 May; Scotland and Uganda on 6 May; Ireland and Papua New Guinea on 7 May; Sri Lanka on 9 May; Namibia on 10 May; Netherlands on 13 May; and Bangladesh on 14 May. Pakistan became the final team to announce their squad for the tournament on 24 May.

The players are listed in the order of shirt numbers with the withdrawn players placed at the bottom of the table followed by standby players. Given ages are as of 1 June 2024. Withdrawn/dropped players are struck through, and standby players are indicated by a dagger symbol (†). Domestic teams are the recent T20 league teams that the players belonged to before the T20 World Cup and are only listed for the countries with available data.

== Group A ==
=== Canada ===
- Squad announcement date: 2 May 2024
- Coach: (Sri Lanka) Pubudu Dassanayake

Canada squad for the tournament
No.	Player	Date of birth	Batting style	Bowling style	GT20C team
3	Pargat Singh	13 April 1992 (aged 32)	Right-handed	Right-arm off break	Surrey Jaguars
4	Shreyas Movva (wk)	4 September 1993 (aged 30)	Right-handed	—N/a	Mississauga Panthers
5	Kaleem Sana	1 January 1994 (aged 30)	Right-handed	Left-arm medium fast	Montreal Tigers
6	Rayyan Pathan	6 December 1991 (aged 32)	Right-handed	Right-arm medium	Vancouver Knights
13	Nikhil Dutta (Note: Harsh Thaker was ruled out of the tournament due to an injury and was replaced by Nikhil Dutta.)	13 October 1994 (aged 29)	Right-handed	Right-arm off break	Mississauga Panthers
20	Dillon Heyliger	21 October 1989 (aged 34)	Right-handed	Right-arm medium fast	Surrey Jaguars
23	Saad Bin Zafar (c)	10 November 1986 (aged 37)	Left-handed	Slow left-arm orthodox	Toronto Nationals
37	Navneet Dhaliwal	10 October 1988 (aged 35)	Right-handed	Right-arm medium	Mississauga Panthers
45	Aaron Johnson	16 March 1991 (aged 33)	Right-handed	Right-arm off break	Brampton Wolves
49	Ravinderpal Singh	14 October 1988 (aged 35)	Right-handed	Right-arm medium	Vancouver Knights
50	Rishiv Joshi (Note: Kanwarpal Tathgur was dropped from the final squad and was replaced by Rishiv Joshi.)	4 October 2000 (aged 23)	Right-handed	Left-arm medium fast	Brampton Wolves
63	Nicholas Kirton	6 May 1998 (aged 26)	Left-handed	Right-arm off break	Toronto Nationals
81	Junaid Siddiqui	25 March 1985 (aged 39)	Right-handed	Right-arm leg break	—N/a
84	Dilpreet Bajwa	4 January 2001 (aged 23)	Right-handed	Right-arm off break	Montreal Tigers
91	Jeremy Gordon	20 January 1987 (aged 37)	Right-handed	Right-arm fast	Brampton Wolves
18	~~Harsh Thaker~~	24 October 1997 (aged 26)	Right-handed	Right-arm off break	Vancouver Knights
58	~~Kanwarpal Tathgur (wk)~~	5 August 1993 (aged 30)	Right-handed	—N/a	Vancouver Knights

=== India ===
- Squad announcement date: 30 April 2024
- Coach: (India) Rahul Dravid

India squad for the tournament
No.	Player	Date of birth	Batting style	Bowling style	IPL team
2	Arshdeep Singh	5 February 1999 (aged 25)	Left-handed	Left-arm medium fast	Punjab Kings
3	Yuzvendra Chahal	23 July 1990 (aged 33)	Right-handed	Right-arm leg break	Rajasthan Royals
8	Ravindra Jadeja	6 December 1988 (aged 35)	Left-handed	Slow left-arm orthodox	Chennai Super Kings
9	Sanju Samson (wk)	11 November 1994 (aged 29)	Right-handed	Right-arm off spin	Rajasthan Royals
17	Rishabh Pant (wk)	4 October 1997 (aged 26)	Left-handed	—N/a	Delhi Capitals
18	Virat Kohli	5 November 1988 (aged 35)	Right-handed	Right-arm medium	Royal Challengers Bengaluru
20	Axar Patel	20 January 1994 (aged 30)	Left-handed	Slow left-arm orthodox	Delhi Capitals
23	Kuldeep Yadav	14 December 1994 (aged 29)	Left-handed	Left-arm wrist spin	Delhi Capitals
25	Shivam Dube	26 June 1993 (aged 30)	Left-handed	Right-arm medium	Chennai Super Kings
33	Hardik Pandya (vc)	11 October 1993 (aged 30)	Right-handed	Right-arm medium fast	Mumbai Indians
45	Rohit Sharma (c)	30 April 1987 (aged 37)	Right-handed	Right-arm off spin	Mumbai Indians
63	Suryakumar Yadav	14 September 1990 (aged 33)	Right-handed	Right-arm off spin	Mumbai Indians
64	Yashasvi Jaiswal	28 December 2001 (aged 22)	Left-handed	Right-arm leg break	Rajasthan Royals
73	Mohammed Siraj	13 March 1994 (aged 30)	Right-handed	Right-arm medium fast	Royal Challengers Bengaluru
93	Jasprit Bumrah	6 December 1993 (aged 30)	Right-handed	Right-arm fast	Mumbai Indians
35	Rinku Singh† (Note: Standby players)	12 October 1997 (aged 26)	Left-handed	Right-arm off spin	Kolkata Knight Riders
65	Avesh Khan†	13 December 1996 (aged 27)	Right-handed	Right-arm medium fast	Rajasthan Royals
71	Khaleel Ahmed†	5 December 1997 (aged 26)	Right-handed	Left-arm medium fast	Delhi Capitals
77	Shubman Gill†	8 September 1999 (aged 24)	Right-handed	Right-arm off spin	Gujarat Titans

=== Ireland ===
- Squad announcement date: 7 May 2024
- Coach: (South Africa) Heinrich Malan

Ireland squad for the tournament
No.	Player	Date of birth	Batting style	Bowling style	IPT20 team
1	Paul Stirling (c)	3 September 1990 (aged 33)	Right-handed	Right-arm off break	Northern Knights
3	Lorcan Tucker (wk)	10 September 1996 (aged 27)	Right-handed	—N/a	Leinster Lightning
5	Neil Rock (wk)	24 September 2000 (aged 23)	Left-handed	—N/a	Northern Knights
13	Harry Tector	6 December 1999 (aged 24)	Right-handed	Right-arm off break	Leinster Lightning
15	Ross Adair	21 April 1994 (aged 30)	Right-handed	—N/a	Northern Knights
32	Mark Adair	27 March 1996 (aged 28)	Right-handed	Right-arm medium fast	Northern Knights
41	Graham Hume	23 November 1990 (aged 33)	Left-handed	Right-arm medium fast	North West Warriors
44	Craig Young	4 April 1990 (aged 34)	Right-handed	Right-arm medium fast	North West Warriors
50	George Dockrell	22 July 1992 (aged 31)	Right-handed	Slow left-arm orthodox	Leinster Lightning
60	Barry McCarthy	13 September 1992 (aged 31)	Right-handed	Right-arm medium fast	Leinster Lightning
63	Andrew Balbirnie	28 December 1990 (aged 33)	Right-handed	Right-arm off break	Leinster Lightning
64	Gareth Delany	28 April 1997 (aged 27)	Right-handed	Right-arm leg break	Munster Reds
82	Josh Little	1 November 1999 (aged 24)	Right-handed	Left-arm medium fast	Leinster Lightning
85	Curtis Campher	20 April 1999 (aged 25)	Right-handed	Right-arm medium fast	Munster Reds
86	Ben White	29 August 1998 (aged 25)	Right-handed	Right-arm leg break	Northern Knights

=== Pakistan ===
- Squad announcement date: 24 May 2024
- Coach: (South Africa) Gary Kirsten

Pakistan squad for the tournament
No.	Player	Date of birth	Batting style	Bowling style	PSL team
5	Mohammad Amir	13 April 1992 (aged 32)	Left-handed	Left-arm fast medium	Quetta Gladiators
7	Shadab Khan	4 October 1998 (aged 25)	Right-handed	Right-arm leg break	Islamabad United
9	Imad Wasim	18 December 1988 (aged 35)	Left-handed	Slow left-arm orthodox	Islamabad United
10	Shaheen Afridi	6 April 2000 (aged 24)	Left-handed	Left-arm fast	Lahore Qalandars
16	Mohammad Rizwan (wk)	1 June 1992 (aged 32)	Right-handed	Right-arm medium	Multan Sultans
39	Fakhar Zaman	10 April 1990 (aged 34)	Left-handed	Slow left-arm orthodox	Peshawar Zalmi
40	Abrar Ahmed	11 September 1998 (aged 25)	Right-handed	Right-arm leg break	Quetta Gladiators
55	Abbas Afridi	4 May 2001 (aged 23)	Right-handed	Right-arm medium fast	Multan Sultans
56	Babar Azam (c)	15 October 1994 (aged 29)	Right-handed	Right-arm off break	Peshawar Zalmi
63	Saim Ayub	24 May 2002 (aged 22)	Left-handed	Right-arm off break	Peshawar Zalmi
71	Naseem Shah	15 February 2003 (aged 21)	Right-handed	Right-arm fast	Islamabad United
77	Azam Khan (wk)	10 August 1998 (aged 25)	Right-handed	—N/a	Islamabad United
78	Usman Khan (wk)	10 May 1995 (aged 29)	Right-handed	Right-arm off break	Multan Sultans
95	Iftikhar Ahmed	3 September 1990 (aged 33)	Right-handed	Right-arm off break	Multan Sultans
97	Haris Rauf	7 November 1993 (aged 30)	Right-handed	Right-arm fast	Lahore Qalandars

=== United States ===
- Squad announcement date: 3 May 2024
- Coach: (Australia) Stuart Law

United States squad for the tournament
No.	Player	Date of birth	Batting style	Bowling style	MLC team
1	Monank Patel (c, wk)	1 May 1993 (aged 31)	Right-handed	—N/a	MI New York
7	Nisarg Patel	20 April 1988 (aged 36)	Right-handed	Slow left-arm orthodox	—N/a
8	Steven Taylor	9 November 1993 (aged 30)	Left-handed	Right-arm off break	MI New York
14	Milind Kumar	15 February 1991 (aged 33)	Right-handed	Right-arm off break	Texas Super Kings
20	Saurabh Netravalkar	16 October 1991 (aged 32)	Right-handed	Left-arm fast medium	Washington Freedom
21	Nitish Kumar	21 May 1994 (aged 30)	Right-handed	Right-arm off break	Los Angeles Knight Riders
27	Harmeet Singh Baddhan	7 September 1992 (aged 31)	Left-handed	Slow left-arm orthodox	Seattle Orcas
29	Jessy Singh	10 February 1993 (aged 31)	Right-handed	Right-arm medium	—N/a
30	Shayan Jahangir (wk)	24 December 1994 (aged 29)	Right-handed	Right-arm fast medium	MI New York
47	Ali Khan	13 December 1990 (aged 33)	Right-handed	Right-arm fast medium	Los Angeles Knight Riders
64	Nosthush Kenjige	2 March 1991 (aged 33)	Left-handed	Slow left-arm orthodox	MI New York
68	Andries Gous	24 November 1994 (aged 29)	Right-handed	—N/a	Washington Freedom
78	Corey Anderson	13 December 1990 (aged 33)	Left-handed	Left-arm medium fast	San Francisco Unicorns
85	Aaron Jones (vc)	19 October 1994 (aged 29)	Right-handed	Right-arm leg spin	Seattle Orcas
89	Shadley van Schalkwyk	5 July 1988 (aged 35)	Left-handed	Right-arm medium	Los Angeles Knight Riders
5	Juanoy Drysdale† (Note: Standby players)	5 January 1992 (aged 32)	Right-handed	Right-arm medium	—N/a
46	Gajanand Singh†	3 October 1987 (aged 36)	Left-handed	Right-arm off spin	—N/a
88	Yasir Mohammad†	10 October 2002 (aged 21)	Left-handed	Right-arm leg break googly	Washington Freedom

== Group B ==
=== Australia ===
- Squad announcement date: 1 May 2024
- Coach: (Australia) Andrew McDonald

Australia squad for the tournament
No.	Player	Date of birth	Batting style	Bowling style	BBL team
8	Mitchell Marsh (c)	20 October 1991 (aged 32)	Right-handed	Right-arm medium	Perth Scorchers
12	Nathan Ellis	22 September 1994 (aged 29)	Right-handed	Right-arm fast medium	Hobart Hurricanes
13	Matthew Wade (wk)	22 December 1987 (aged 36)	Left-handed	Right-arm medium	Hobart Hurricanes
17	Marcus Stoinis	16 August 1989 (aged 34)	Right-handed	Right-arm medium	Melbourne Stars
30	Pat Cummins	8 May 1993 (aged 31)	Right-handed	Right-arm fast	—N/a
31	David Warner	27 October 1986 (aged 37)	Left-handed	—N/a	Sydney Thunder
32	Glenn Maxwell	14 October 1988 (aged 35)	Right-handed	Right-arm off break	Melbourne Stars
38	Josh Hazlewood	3 May 1991 (aged 33)	Left-handed	Right-arm fast medium	—N/a
42	Cameron Green	3 June 1999 (aged 24)	Right-handed	Right-arm fast medium	Perth Scorchers
46	Ashton Agar	14 October 1993 (aged 30)	Left-handed	Slow left-arm orthodox	Perth Scorchers
48	Josh Inglis (wk)	4 March 1995 (aged 29)	Right-handed	—N/a	Perth Scorchers
56	Mitchell Starc	30 January 1990 (aged 34)	Left-handed	Left-arm fast	—N/a
62	Travis Head	29 December 1993 (aged 30)	Left-handed	Right-arm off break	Adelaide Strikers
85	Tim David	16 March 1996 (aged 28)	Right-handed	Right-arm off break	Hobart Hurricanes
88	Adam Zampa	31 March 1992 (aged 32)	Right-handed	Right-arm leg break	Melbourne Renegades
5	Matthew Short† (Note: Standby players)	8 November 1995 (aged 28)	Right-handed	Right-arm off break	Adelaide Strikers
23	Jake Fraser-McGurk†	11 April 2002 (aged 22)	Right-handed	Right-arm leg break	Melbourne Renegades

=== England ===
- Squad announcement date: 30 April 2024
- Coach: (Australia) Matthew Mott

England squad for the tournament
No.	Player	Date of birth	Batting style	Bowling style	T20 Blast team
17	Ben Duckett	17 October 1994 (aged 29)	Left-handed	Right-arm leg break	Nottinghamshire
18	Moeen Ali (vc)	18 June 1987 (aged 36)	Left-handed	Right-arm off spin	Warwickshire
22	Jofra Archer	1 April 1995 (aged 29)	Right-handed	Right-arm fast	Sussex
23	Liam Livingstone	4 August 1993 (aged 30)	Right-handed	Right-arm leg break	Lancashire
33	Mark Wood	11 January 1990 (aged 34)	Right-handed	Right-arm fast	Durham
34	Chris Jordan	4 October 1988 (aged 35)	Right-handed	Right-arm fast medium	Surrey
38	Reece Topley	21 February 1994 (aged 30)	Right-handed	Left-arm medium fast	Surrey
51	Jonny Bairstow (wk)	26 September 1989 (aged 34)	Right-handed	—N/a	Yorkshire
58	Sam Curran	3 June 1998 (aged 25)	Left-handed	Left-arm medium fast	Surrey
61	Phil Salt (wk)	28 August 1996 (aged 27)	Right-handed	Right-arm medium	Lancashire
63	Jos Buttler (c, wk)	8 September 1990 (aged 33)	Right-handed	—N/a	Lancashire
79	Tom Hartley	3 May 1999 (aged 25)	Left-handed	Slow left-arm orthodox	Lancashire
85	Will Jacks	21 November 1998 (aged 25)	Right-handed	Right-arm off spin	Surrey
88	Harry Brook	22 February 1999 (aged 25)	Right-handed	Right-arm medium	Yorkshire
95	Adil Rashid	17 February 1988 (aged 36)	Right-handed	Right-arm leg break	Yorkshire

=== Namibia ===
- Squad announcement date: 10 May 2024
- Coach: (South Africa) Pierre de Bruyn

Namibia squad for the tournament
No.	Player	Date of birth	Batting style	Bowling style
1	Bernard Scholtz	3 October 1990 (aged 33)	Right-handed	Slow left-arm orthodox
7	Gerhard Erasmus (c)	11 April 1995 (aged 29)	Right-handed	Right-arm off break
9	Tangeni Lungameni	17 April 1992 (aged 32)	Left-handed	Left-arm medium
12	JJ Smit (vc)	10 November 1995 (aged 28)	Right-handed	Left-arm medium fast
17	Peter-Daniel Blignaut	21 October 2005 (aged 18)	Right-handed	Slow left-arm orthodox
20	Malan Kruger	12 August 1995 (aged 28)	Right-handed	—N/a
22	Dylan Leicher	3 March 2004 (aged 20)	Right-handed	Right-arm medium
31	Jack Brassell	31 March 2005 (aged 19)	Right-handed	Right-arm medium
32	Jean-Pierre Kotze (wk)	23 April 1994 (aged 30)	Left-handed	—N/a
47	Ben Shikongo	8 May 2000 (aged 24)	Right-handed	Right-arm fast medium
48	Zane Green (wk)	11 October 1996 (aged 27)	Left-handed	—N/a
49	Jan Frylinck	6 April 1994 (aged 30)	Left-handed	Left-arm medium fast
63	Michael van Lingen	24 October 1997 (aged 26)	Left-handed	Left-arm medium
64	Niko Davin	19 December 1997 (aged 26)	Right-handed	Right-arm leg break
70	Ruben Trumpelmann	1 February 1998 (aged 26)	Right-handed	Left-arm fast medium
96	David Wiese	18 May 1985 (aged 39)	Right-handed	Right-arm fast medium

=== Oman ===
- Squad announcement date: 1 May 2024
- Coach: (Sri Lanka) Duleep Mendis

Oman squad for the tournament
No.	Player	Date of birth	Batting style	Bowling style
1	Fayyaz Butt	17 August 1993 (aged 30)	Right-handed	Right-arm medium fast
6	Shoaib Khan	6 December 1992 (aged 31)	Right-handed	Right-arm medium
8	Kashyap Prajapati	11 October 1995 (aged 28)	Right-handed	Right-arm off break
12	Zeeshan Maqsood	24 October 1987 (aged 36)	Left-handed	Slow left-arm orthodox
14	Mehran Khan	13 April 1987 (aged 37)	Right-handed	Right-arm medium fast
18	Bilal Khan	10 April 1987 (aged 37)	Left-handed	Left-arm fast medium
20	Rafiullah	16 August 1996 (aged 27)	Right-handed	Right-arm medium
22	Kaleemullah	24 December 1990 (aged 33)	Right-handed	Right-arm medium
27	Pratik Athavale (wk)	20 April 1997 (aged 27)	Right-handed	Right-arm off break
30	Ayaan Khan	31 August 1992 (aged 31)	Left-handed	Slow left-arm orthodox
47	Aqib Ilyas (c)	5 September 1992 (aged 31)	Right-handed	Right-arm off spin
50	Shakeel Ahmed	4 February 1988 (aged 36)	Left-handed	Slow left-arm orthodox
75	Khalid Kail	13 October 1996 (aged 27)	Right-handed	—N/a
86	Naseem Khushi (wk)	11 August 1982 (aged 41)	Right-handed	—N/a
99	Mohammad Nadeem	4 September 1982 (aged 41)	Right-handed	Right-arm medium fast
10	Jatinder Singh† (Note: Standby players)	5 March 1989 (aged 35)	Right-handed	Right-arm off break
11	Jay Odedra†	5 November 1989 (aged 34)	Right-handed	Right-arm off break
15	Samay Shrivastava†	13 March 1991 (aged 33)	Right-handed	Leg break
21	Sufyan Mehmood†	21 October 1991 (aged 32)	Left-handed	Right-arm medium

=== Scotland ===
- Squad announcement date: 6 May 2024
- Coach: (South Africa) Doug Watson

Scotland squad for the tournament
No.	Player	Date of birth	Batting style	Bowling style
4	Brad Currie	8 November 1998 (aged 25)	Right-handed	Left-arm medium fast
9	Matthew Cross (wk)	15 October 1992 (aged 31)	Right-handed	—N/a
13	Chris Greaves	12 October 1990 (aged 33)	Right-handed	Right-arm leg break
14	Oli Hairs	14 April 1991 (aged 33)	Left-handed	Right-arm off break
21	Brandon McMullen	18 October 1999 (aged 24)	Right-handed	Right-arm fast medium
24	Charlie Tear (wk)	12 June 2004 (aged 19)	Right-handed	—N/a
29	Michael Leask	29 October 1990 (aged 33)	Right-handed	Right-arm off break
44	Richie Berrington (c)	3 April 1987 (aged 37)	Right-handed	Right-arm medium fast
49	Michael Jones	5 January 1998 (aged 26)	Right-handed	Right-arm off break
50	Safyaan Sharif	24 May 1991 (aged 33)	Right-handed	Right-arm fast medium
51	Mark Watt	29 July 1996 (aged 27)	Left-handed	Slow left-arm orthodox
58	Brad Wheal	28 August 1996 (aged 27)	Right-handed	Right-arm fast medium
66	Jack Jarvis	29 May 2003 (aged 21)	Right-handed	Right-arm medium fast
69	Chris Sole	27 February 1994 (aged 30)	Right-handed	Right-arm fast
93	George Munsey	21 February 1993 (aged 31)	Left-handed	Right-arm medium fast

== Group C ==
=== Afghanistan ===
- Squad announcement date: 30 April 2024
- Coach: (England) Jonathan Trott

Afghanistan squad for the tournament
No.	Player	Date of birth	Batting style	Bowling style	SCL team
1	Najibullah Zadran	28 February 1993 (aged 31)	Left-handed	Right-arm off spin	Boost Defenders
3	Hazratullah Zazai (Note: Mujeeb Ur Rahman was ruled out of the tournament due to an injury and was replaced by Hazratullah Zazai.)	23 March 1998 (aged 26)	Left-handed	Left-arm orthodox	Boost Defenders
5	Fazalhaq Farooqi	22 September 2000 (aged 23)	Right-handed	Left-arm fast medium	Boost Defenders
7	Mohammad Nabi	1 January 1985 (aged 39)	Right-handed	Right-arm off spin	Kabul Eagles
9	Azmatullah Omarzai	24 March 2000 (aged 24)	Right-handed	Right-arm medium fast	Kabul Eagles
11	Karim Janat	10 August 1994 (aged 29)	Left-handed	Left-arm fast medium	Band-e-Amir Dragons
12	Nangialai Kharoti	25 April 2004 (aged 20)	Left-handed	Slow left-arm orthodox	Boost Defenders
14	Gulbadin Naib	16 March 1991 (aged 33)	Right-handed	Right-arm fast medium	Amo Sharks
15	Noor Ahmad	3 January 2005 (aged 19)	Left-handed	Left-arm unorthodox spin	Band-e-Amir Dragons
18	Ibrahim Zadran	12 December 2001 (aged 22)	Right-handed	Right-arm medium fast	Mis Ainak Knights
19	Rashid Khan (c)	20 September 1998 (aged 25)	Right-handed	Right-arm leg break	Band-e-Amir Dragons
21	Rahmanullah Gurbaz (wk)	28 November 2001 (aged 22)	Right-handed	—N/a	Kabul Eagles
27	Mohammad Ishaq (wk)	1 February 2005 (aged 19)	Right-handed	—N/a	Amo Sharks
56	Fareed Ahmad	10 August 1994 (aged 29)	Left-handed	Left-arm fast medium	Speenghar Tigers
78	Naveen-ul-Haq	23 September 1999 (aged 24)	Right-handed	Right-arm medium fast	Kabul Eagles
88	~~Mujeeb Ur Rahman~~	28 March 2001 (aged 23)	Right-handed	Right-arm off spin	—N/a
26	Sediqullah Atal† (Note: Standby players)	12 August 2001 (aged 22)	Left-handed	—N/a	Band-e-Amir Dragons
68	Mohammad Saleem†	9 September 2002 (aged 21)	Right-handed	Right-arm fast	Amo Sharks

=== New Zealand ===
- Squad announcement date: 29 April 2024
- Coach: (New Zealand) Gary Stead

New Zealand squad for the tournament
No.	Player	Date of birth	Batting style	Bowling style	Super Smash team
4	Michael Bracewell	14 February 1991 (aged 33)	Left-handed	Right-arm off spin	Wellington
8	Rachin Ravindra	18 November 1999 (aged 24)	Left-handed	Slow left-arm orthodox	Wellington
16	Finn Allen (wk)	22 April 1999 (aged 25)	Right-handed	Right-arm off spin	Auckland
18	Trent Boult	22 July 1989 (aged 34)	Right-handed	Left-arm fast medium	Northern
21	Matt Henry	14 December 1991 (aged 32)	Right-handed	Right-arm fast medium	Canterbury
22	Kane Williamson (c)	8 August 1990 (aged 33)	Right-handed	Right-arm off spin	Northern Districts
23	Glenn Phillips	6 December 1996 (aged 27)	Right-handed	Right-arm off spin	Otago
38	Tim Southee	11 December 1988 (aged 35)	Right-handed	Right-arm medium fast	Northern Districts
50	James Neesham	17 September 1990 (aged 33)	Left-handed	Right-arm medium fast	Auckland
61	Ish Sodhi	31 October 1992 (aged 31)	Right-handed	Right-arm leg break	Northern Districts
69	Lockie Ferguson	13 June 1991 (aged 32)	Right-handed	Right-arm fast	Auckland
74	Mitchell Santner	5 February 1992 (aged 32)	Left-handed	Slow left-arm orthodox	Northern Districts
75	Daryl Mitchell	20 May 1991 (aged 33)	Right-handed	Right-arm medium	Canterbury
80	Mark Chapman	27 June 1994 (aged 29)	Left-handed	Slow left-arm orthodox	Auckland
88	Devon Conway (wk)	8 July 1991 (aged 32)	Left-handed	Right-arm medium	Wellington
14	Ben Sears† (Note: Standby players)	11 February 1998 (aged 26)	Right-handed	Right-arm fast medium	Wellington

=== Papua New Guinea ===
- Squad announcement date: 7 May 2024
- Coach: (Zimbabwe) Tatenda Taibu

Papua New Guinea squad for the tournament
No.	Player	Date of birth	Batting style	Bowling style
2	Norman Vanua	2 December 1993 (aged 30)	Right-handed	Right-arm medium
4	Tony Ura	15 October 1989 (aged 34)	Right-handed	—N/a
5	Semo Kamea	21 August 2001 (aged 22)	Left-handed	Left-arm fast
6	Lega Siaka	21 December 1992 (aged 31)	Right-handed	Right-arm leg break
8	Alei Nao	9 December 1993 (aged 30)	Right-handed	Right-arm medium
13	Assad Vala (c)	5 August 1987 (aged 36)	Left-handed	Right-arm off break
14	Jack Gardner	23 December 2000 (aged 23)	Right-handed	Right-arm medium
16	Kabua Morea	30 September 1993 (aged 30)	Right-handed	Left-arm medium
34	Sese Bau	23 June 1992 (aged 31)	Left-handed	Right-arm medium
44	Hiri Hiri	1 May 1995 (aged 29)	Right-handed	Right-arm off break
45	Kiplin Doriga (wk)	18 September 1995 (aged 28)	Right-handed	—N/a
67	Hila Vare (wk)	10 August 2001 (aged 22)	Left-handed	—N/a
75	John Kariko	16 January 2004 (aged 20)	Left-handed	Slow left-arm orthodox
77	Chad Soper	19 November 1991 (aged 32)	Right-handed	Right-arm medium
92	Charles Amini (vc)	14 April 1992 (aged 32)	Left-handed	Right-arm leg break

=== Uganda ===
- Squad announcement date: 6 May 2024
- Coach: (India) Abhay Sharma

Uganda squad for the tournament
No.	Player	Date of birth	Batting style	Bowling style
4	Henry Ssenyondo	12 August 1993 (aged 30)	Right-handed	Slow left-arm orthodox
7	Ronak Patel (wk)	18 August 1988 (aged 35)	Right-handed	Slow left-arm orthodox
8	Kenneth Waiswa	11 November 1998 (aged 25)	Right-handed	Right-arm medium
14	Frank Nsubuga	20 August 1980 (aged 43)	Right-handed	Slow left-arm orthodox
19	Dinesh Nakrani	21 September 1991 (aged 32)	Left-handed	Left-arm medium
22	Riazat Ali Shah (vc)	20 February 1998 (aged 26)	Right-handed	Right-arm medium
24	Simon Ssesazi	6 June 1996 (aged 27)	Left-handed	Right-arm slow
37	Roger Mukasa (wk)	22 May 1989 (aged 35)	Right-handed	Right-arm off break
39	Cosmas Kyewuta	28 December 2001 (aged 22)	Right-handed	Right-arm medium
46	Fred Achelam (wk)	27 January 2001 (aged 23)	Right-handed	—N/a
49	Brian Masaba (c)	22 September 1991 (aged 32)	Right-handed	Right-arm fast medium
57	Juma Miyagi	5 April 2003 (aged 21)	Right-handed	Right-arm medium
69	Alpesh Ramjani	24 September 1994 (aged 29)	Left-handed	Slow left-arm orthodox
82	Robinson Obuya	12 December 2000 (aged 23)	Right-handed	—N/a
99	Bilal Hassan	15 April 1990 (aged 34)	Right-handed	Right-arm medium fast

=== West Indies ===
- Squad announcement date: 3 May 2024
- Coach: (Cricket West Indies) Daren Sammy

West Indies squad for the tournament
No.	Player	Date of birth	Batting style	Bowling style	CPL team
2	Shimron Hetmyer	26 December 1996 (aged 27)	Left-handed	—N/a	Guyana Amazon Warriors
4	Shai Hope (wk)	10 November 1993 (aged 30)	Right-handed	—N/a	Guyana Amazon Warriors
7	Akeal Hosein	25 April 1993 (aged 31)	Left-handed	Slow left-arm orthodox	Trinbago Knight Riders
8	Alzarri Joseph (vc)	20 November 1996 (aged 27)	Right-handed	Right-arm fast	Saint Lucia Kings
10	Roston Chase	22 March 1992 (aged 32)	Right-handed	Right-arm off break	Saint Lucia Kings
12	Andre Russell	29 April 1988 (aged 36)	Right-handed	Right-arm fast	Trinbago Knight Riders
16	Romario Shepherd	26 November 1994 (aged 29)	Right-handed	Right-arm fast medium	Guyana Amazon Warriors
25	Johnson Charles	14 January 1989 (aged 35)	Right-handed	Left-arm orthodox	Saint Lucia Kings
29	Nicholas Pooran (wk)	2 October 1994 (aged 29)	Left-handed	Right-arm off break	Trinbago Knight Riders
52	Rovman Powell (c)	23 July 1993 (aged 30)	Right-handed	Right-arm medium fast	Barbados Royals
61	Obed McCoy (Note: Jason Holder was ruled out of the tournament due to an injury and was replaced by Obed McCoy.)	4 January 1997 (aged 27)	Left-handed	Left-arm fast medium	Barbados Royals
64	Gudakesh Motie	29 March 1995 (aged 29)	Left-handed	Slow left-arm orthodox	Guyana Amazon Warriors
68	Sherfane Rutherford	15 August 1998 (aged 25)	Left-handed	Right-arm medium fast	St Kitts & Nevis Patriots
70	Shamar Joseph	31 August 1999 (aged 24)	Left-handed	Right-arm fast	Guyana Amazon Warriors
71	Kyle Mayers (Note: Brandon King was ruled out of the tournament due to an injury and was replaced by Kyle Mayers.)	8 September 1992 (aged 31)	Left-handed	Right-arm medium fast	Barbados Royals
53	~~Brandon King~~	16 December 1994 (aged 29)	Right-handed	—N/a	Jamaica Tallawahs
98	~~Jason Holder~~	5 November 1991 (aged 32)	Right-handed	Right-arm medium fast	Barbados Royals
5	Matthew Forde† (Note: Standby players)	29 April 2002 (aged 22)	Right-handed	Right-arm medium fast	Saint Lucia Kings
72	Andre Fletcher†	28 November 1987 (aged 36)	Right-handed	Right-arm medium fast	St Kitts & Nevis Patriots
86	Hayden Walsh Jr.†	23 April 1992 (aged 32)	Left-handed	Right-arm leg break	Jamaica Tallawahs
97	Fabian Allen†	17 May 1995 (aged 29)	Right-handed	Slow left-arm orthodox	Jamaica Tallawahs

== Group D ==
=== Bangladesh ===
- Squad announcement date: 14 May 2024
- Coach: (Sri Lanka) Chandika Hathurusingha

Bangladesh squad for the tournament
No.	Player	Date of birth	Batting style	Bowling style	BPL team
3	Taskin Ahmed (vc)	3 April 1995 (aged 29)	Left-handed	Right-arm fast	Durdanto Dhaka
16	Litton Das (wk)	13 October 1994 (aged 29)	Right-handed	—N/a	Comilla Victorians
22	Rishad Hossain	15 July 2002 (aged 21)	Right-handed	Right-arm leg break	Comilla Victorians
30	Mahmudullah	4 February 1986 (aged 38)	Right-handed	Right-arm off break	Fortune Barishal
31	Tanzid Hasan	1 December 2000 (aged 23)	Left-handed	—N/a	Chattogram Challengers
41	Tanzim Hasan Sakib	20 October 2002 (aged 21)	Right-handed	Right-arm fast medium	Sylhet Strikers
47	Shoriful Islam	3 June 2001 (aged 22)	Left-handed	Left-arm medium fast	Durdanto Dhaka
51	Jaker Ali (wk)	22 February 1998 (aged 26)	Right-handed	—N/a	Comilla Victorians
55	Mahedi Hasan	12 December 1994 (aged 29)	Right-handed	Right-arm off spin	Rangpur Riders
59	Soumya Sarkar	25 February 1993 (aged 31)	Left-handed	Right-arm medium	Fortune Barishal
69	Tanvir Islam	25 October 1996 (aged 27)	Left-handed	Slow left-arm orthodox	Comilla Victorians
75	Shakib Al Hasan	24 March 1987 (aged 37)	Left-handed	Slow left-arm orthodox	Rangpur Riders
77	Towhid Hridoy	4 December 2000 (aged 23)	Right-handed	Right-arm off break	Comilla Victorians
90	Mustafizur Rahman	6 September 1995 (aged 28)	Left-handed	Left-arm fast medium	Comilla Victorians
99	Najmul Hossain Shanto (c)	25 August 1998 (aged 25)	Left-handed	Right-arm off spin	Sylhet Strikers
88	Afif Hossain† (Note: Standby players)	22 September 1999 (aged 24)	Left-handed	Right-arm off break	Khulna Tigers
91	Hasan Mahmud†	12 October 1999 (aged 24)	Right-handed	Right-arm fast	Rangpur Riders

=== Nepal ===
- Squad announcement date: 1 May 2024
- Coach: (India) Monty Desai

Nepal squad for the tournament
No.	Player	Date of birth	Batting style	Bowling style
2	Kushal Malla	5 March 2004 (aged 20)	Left-handed	Slow left-arm orthodox
8	Sagar Dhakal	14 December 2001 (aged 22)	Right-handed	Slow left-arm orthodox
9	Aasif Sheikh (wk)	22 January 2001 (aged 23)	Right-handed	—N/a
10	Sompal Kami	2 February 1996 (aged 28)	Right-handed	Right-arm medium
14	Kushal Bhurtel	22 January 1997 (aged 27)	Right-handed	Right-arm leg break
15	Gulsan Jha	17 February 2006 (aged 18)	Left-handed	Right-arm medium
16	Anil Sah (wk)	17 November 1998 (aged 25)	Right-handed	Right-arm off break
17	Rohit Paudel (c)	2 September 2002 (aged 21)	Right-handed	Right-arm off spin
21	Sundeep Jora	22 October 2001 (aged 22)	Right-handed	—N/a
25	Sandeep Lamichhane	2 August 2000 (aged 23)	Right-handed	Right-arm leg break
27	Lalit Rajbanshi	27 February 1999 (aged 25)	Right-handed	Slow left-arm orthodox
33	Karan KC	10 October 1991 (aged 32)	Right-handed	Right-arm medium
45	Dipendra Singh Airee	24 January 2000 (aged 24)	Right-handed	Right-arm off spin
55	Abinash Bohara	30 July 1997 (aged 26)	Right-handed	Right-arm medium
94	Kamal Singh Airee	19 December 2000 (aged 23)	Right-handed	Right-arm medium fast

=== Netherlands ===
- Squad announcement date: 13 May 2024
- Coach: (South Africa) Ryan Cook

Netherlands squad for the tournament
No.	Player	Date of birth	Batting style	Bowling style
1	Kyle Klein (Note: Fred Klaassen was ruled out of the tournament due to an injury and was replaced by Kyle Klein.)	3 July 2001 (aged 22)	Right-handed	Right-arm medium fast
4	Max O'Dowd	4 March 1994 (aged 30)	Right-handed	Right-arm leg break
5	Bas de Leede	15 November 1999 (aged 24)	Right-handed	Right-arm medium fast
7	Vikramjit Singh	9 January 2003 (aged 21)	Left-handed	Right-arm medium
11	Tim Pringle	29 August 2002 (aged 21)	Right-handed	Slow left-arm orthodox
17	Logan van Beek	7 September 1990 (aged 33)	Right-handed	Right-arm medium fast
23	Vivian Kingma	23 October 1994 (aged 29)	Right-handed	Right-arm medium fast
25	Teja Nidamanuru	22 August 1994 (aged 29)	Right-handed	Right-arm off break
34	Wesley Barresi (wk)	3 May 1984 (aged 40)	Right-handed	Right-arm off break
35	Scott Edwards (c, wk)	23 August 1996 (aged 27)	Right-handed	Slow left-arm orthodox
47	Paul van Meekeren	15 January 1993 (aged 31)	Right-handed	Right-arm fast medium
55	Michael Levitt	19 June 2003 (aged 20)	Right-handed	Right-arm medium
66	Saqib Zulfiqar (Note: Daniel Doram was ruled out of the tournament due to an injury and was replaced by Saqib Zulfiqar.)	28 March 1997 (aged 27)	Right-handed	Right-arm leg break
72	Sybrand Engelbrecht	15 September 1988 (aged 35)	Right-handed	Right-arm off break
88	Aryan Dutt	17 May 2003 (aged 21)	Right-handed	Right-arm off break
12	~~Fred Klaassen~~	13 November 1992 (aged 31)	Right-handed	Left-arm medium fast
33	~~Daniel Doram~~	13 October 1997 (aged 26)	Left-handed	Slow left-arm orthodox
15	Ryan Klein† (Note: Standby players)	15 June 1997 (aged 26)	Right-handed	Right-arm medium fast

=== South Africa ===
- Squad announcement date: 30 April 2024
- Coach: (South Africa) Rob Walter

South Africa squad for the tournament
No.	Player	Date of birth	Batting style	Bowling style	SA20 team
4	Aiden Markram (c)	4 October 1994 (aged 29)	Right-handed	Right-arm off spin	Sunrisers Eastern Cape
10	David Miller	10 June 1989 (aged 34)	Left-handed	Right-arm off spin	Paarl Royals
12	Quinton de Kock (wk)	17 December 1992 (aged 31)	Left-handed	Slow left-arm orthodox	Durban's Super Giants
16	Keshav Maharaj	7 February 1990 (aged 34)	Right-handed	Slow left-arm orthodox	Durban's Super Giants
17	Reeza Hendricks	14 August 1989 (aged 34)	Right-handed	Right-arm off break	Joburg Super Kings
20	Anrich Nortje	16 November 1993 (aged 30)	Right-handed	Right-arm fast	Pretoria Capitals
25	Kagiso Rabada	25 May 1995 (aged 29)	Right-handed	Right-arm fast	MI Cape Town
26	Tabraiz Shamsi	18 February 1990 (aged 34)	Right-handed	Left-arm unorthodox	Paarl Royals
30	Tristan Stubbs	14 August 2000 (aged 23)	Right-handed	Right-arm off spin	Sunrisers Eastern Cape
41	Ottniel Baartman	18 March 1993 (aged 31)	Right-handed	Right-arm fast medium	Sunrisers Eastern Cape
44	Ryan Rickelton (wk)	11 July 1996 (aged 27)	Left-handed	Slow left-arm orthodox	MI Cape Town
45	Heinrich Klaasen (wk)	30 July 1991 (aged 32)	Right-handed	Right-arm off spin	Durban's Super Giants
62	Gerald Coetzee	2 October 2000 (aged 23)	Right-handed	Right-arm fast	Joburg Super Kings
70	Marco Jansen	1 May 2000 (aged 24)	Right-handed	Left-arm fast	Sunrisers Eastern Cape
77	Bjorn Fortuin	21 October 1994 (aged 29)	Right-handed	Slow left-arm orthodox	Paarl Royals
22	Lungi Ngidi† (Note: Standby players)	29 March 1996 (aged 28)	Right-handed	Right-arm fast	Paarl Royals
71	Nandre Burger†	11 August 1995 (aged 28)	Left-handed	Left-arm fast	Joburg Super Kings

=== Sri Lanka ===
- Squad announcement date: 9 May 2024
- Coach: (England) Chris Silverwood

Sri Lanka squad for the tournament
No.	Player	Date of birth	Batting style	Bowling style	LPL team
1	Dunith Wellalage	9 January 2003 (aged 21)	Left-handed	Slow left-arm orthodox	Colombo Strikers
7	Dasun Shanaka	9 September 1991 (aged 32)	Right-handed	Right-arm medium	B-Love Kandy
13	Kusal Mendis (wk)	2 February 1995 (aged 29)	Right-handed	Right-arm leg break	Jaffna Kings
18	Pathum Nissanka	18 May 1998 (aged 26)	Right-handed	—N/a	Jaffna Kings
21	Kamindu Mendis	30 September 1998 (aged 25)	Left-handed	Right-arm off break Slow left-arm orthodox	B-Love Kandy
23	Sadeera Samarawickrama (wk)	30 August 1995 (aged 28)	Right-handed	—N/a	Colombo Strikers
49	Wanindu Hasaranga (c)	29 July 1997 (aged 26)	Right-handed	Right-arm leg break	B-Love Kandy
53	Nuwan Thushara	6 August 1994 (aged 29)	Right-handed	Right-arm fast medium	Dambulla Sixers
61	Maheesh Theekshana	1 August 2000 (aged 23)	Right-handed	Right-arm off break	Galle Marvels
69	Angelo Mathews	2 June 1987 (aged 36)	Right-handed	Right-arm medium	B-Love Kandy
72	Charith Asalanka (vc)	29 June 1997 (aged 26)	Left-handed	Right-arm off break	Jaffna Kings
75	Dhananjaya de Silva	6 September 1991 (aged 32)	Right-handed	Right-arm off break	Jaffna Kings
79	Dushmantha Chameera	11 January 1992 (aged 32)	Right-handed	Right-arm fast	B-Love Kandy
81	Matheesha Pathirana	18 December 2002 (aged 21)	Right-handed	Right-arm fast	Colombo Strikers
98	Dilshan Madushanka	18 September 2000 (aged 23)	Right-handed	Left-arm fast medium	Dambulla Sixers
54	Bhanuka Rajapaksa† (Note: Standby players)	24 October 1991 (aged 32)	Left-handed	Right-arm medium	Galle Marvels
55	Vijayakanth Viyaskanth†	5 December 2001 (aged 22)	Right-handed	Right-arm leg break	Jaffna Kings
78	Asitha Fernando†	31 July 1997 (aged 26)	Right-handed	Right-arm fast medium	Jaffna Kings
95	Janith Liyanage†	12 July 1995 (aged 28)	Right-handed	Right-arm fast medium	Galle Marvels
