= 2024 Canada Tri-Nation Series =

Sixth tri-nation series round in 2024-26 WCL2

The 2024 Canada Tri-Nation Series was the sixth round of the 2024–2026 Cricket World Cup League 2 cricket tournament that took place in Canada in September 2024. The tri-nation series was contested by the men's national teams of Canada, Nepal and Oman. The matches were played as One Day International (ODI) fixtures.

Following the ODI series, the three sides played a Twenty20 International (T20I) tri-nation series. The series was won by Canada.

== Tour matches ==
11 September 2024
10:30
Scorecard

HP Panthers; 167 (37.1 overs)	v	Oman Select; 170/7 (31.1 overs)
Ajayveer Hundal 58 (74); Ayaan Khan 4/44 (10 overs)		Ayaan Khan 100* (70); Jaskaran Singh Buttar 4/40 (6 overs)

Oman Select won by 3 wickets
Maple Leaf Cricket Club, King City
Player of the match: Ayaan Khan (Oman Select)

- Oman Select won the toss and elected to field.

13 September 2024
10:30
Scorecard

Nepal Select; 247 (47.5 overs)	v	HP Jaguars; 181 (39 overs)
Anil Sah 47* (37); Sheel Patel 2/32 (9 overs)		Ajayveer Hundal 55 (75); Lalit Rajbanshi 4/22 (8 overs)

Nepal Select won by 66 runs
Maple Leaf Cricket Club, King City
Umpires: Ashook Brijcoomar (Can) and Afzaluddin Ahmed (Can)
Player of the match: Lalit Rajbanshi (Nepal Select)

- Nepal Select won the toss and elected to bat.

13 September 2024
10:30
Scorecard

Oman Select; 152 (43.1 overs)	v	HP Panthers; 153/6 (38.2 overs)
Ayaan Khan 36 (55); Gurjot Gosal 3/37 (10 overs)		Mansab Gill 50 (67); Kaleemullah 3/26 (9 overs)

HP Panthers won by 4 wickets
Maple Leaf Cricket Club, King City
Player of the match: Gurjot Gosal (HP Panthers)

- Oman Select won the toss and elected to bat.

== League 2 series ==
2024 Canada Tri-Nation Series
- Part of 2024–2026 Cricket World Cup League 2
- Date: 16–26 September 2024
- Location: Canada
Teams
Canada	Nepal	Oman
Captains
Nicholas Kirton	Rohit Paudel	Aqib Ilyas
Most runs
Pargat Singh (206)	Gulshan Jha (102)	Aqib Ilyas (100)
Most wickets
Dillon Heyliger (11)	Gulshan Jha (7)	Fayyaz Butt (4); Kaleemullah (4); Shakeel Ahmed (4)

=== Squads ===
Canada	Nepal	Oman
Nicholas Kirton (c); Dilpreet Bajwa; Gurbaz Bajwa; Navneet Dhaliwal; Dillon Heyliger; Aaron Johnson; Akhil Kumar; Parveen Kumar; Shreyas Movva (wk); Ansh Patel; Kaleem Sana; Pargat Singh; Harsh Thaker; Kanwarpal Tathgur; Saad Bin Zafar	Rohit Paudel (c); Dipendra Singh Airee; Kushal Bhurtel; Rijan Dhakal; Gulsan Jha; Sompal Kami; Karan KC; Sandeep Lamichhane; Kushal Malla; Lalit Rajbanshi; Anil Sah (wk); Arjun Saud (wk); Bhim Sharki; Aarif Sheikh; Aasif Sheikh (wk)	Aqib Ilyas (c); Shakeel Ahmed; Pratik Athavale (wk); Fayyaz Butt; Khalid Kail; Kaleemullah; Ayaan Khan; Mehran Khan; Shoaib Khan; Zeeshan Maqsood; Jay Odedra; Kashyap Prajapati; Muzahir Raza; Samay Shrivastava; Bukkapatnam Siddharth; Jatinder Singh

Nepal also named Dev Khanal as a travelling reserve.

=== Fixtures ===
==== 1st ODI ====
16 September 2024
11:00
Scorecard

Canada; 253/8 (50 overs)	v	Nepal; 150 (40.1 overs)
Nicholas Kirton 73* (44); Lalit Rajbanshi 2/32 (9 overs)		Karan KC 27 (24); Dillon Heyliger 5/31 (10 overs)

Canada won by 103 runs
Maple Leaf Cricket Club, King City
Umpires: Masudur Rahman (Ban) and Rohan Shah (Can)
Player of the match: Dillon Heyliger (Can)

- Nepal won the toss and elected to field.
- Akhil Kumar and Ansh Patel (Can) both made their ODI debuts.
- Dillon Heyliger (Can) took his first five-wicket haul in ODIs.

==== 2nd ODI ====
18 September 2024
11:00
Scorecard

Nepal; 220/9 (50 overs)	v	Oman; 223/9 (49.5 overs)
Rohit Paudel 60 (72); Fayyaz Butt 2/36 (10 overs)		Jatinder Singh 41 (49); Gulsan Jha 5/47 (10 overs)

Oman won by 1 wicket
Maple Leaf Cricket Club, King City
Umpires: Arnold Maddela (Can) and Masudur Rahman (Ban)
Player of the match: Gulsan Jha (Nep)

- Oman won the toss and elected to field.
- Shakeel Ahmed (Oma) made his ODI debut.
- Gulsan Jha (Nep) took his maiden five-wicket haul in ODIs.

==== 3rd ODI ====
20 September 2024
11:00
Scorecard

Canada; 276/8 (50 overs)	v	Oman; 217 (46 overs)
Harsh Thaker 93 (103); Kaleemullah 2/31 (10 overs)		Fayyaz Butt 44 (52); Dilon Heyliger 4/42 (8 overs)

Canada won by 59 runs
Maple Leaf Cricket Club, King City
Umpires: Masudur Rahman (Ban) and Rohan Shah (Can)
Player of the match: Harsh Thaker (Can)

- Oman won the toss and elected to field.

==== 4th ODI ====
22 September 2024
11:00
Scorecard

Nepal; 181 (46.1 overs)	v	Canada; 186/5 (42 overs)
Sandeep Lamichhane 49 (48); Kaleem Sana 3/29 (10 overs)		Navneet Dhaliwal 87 (113); Sandeep Lamichhane 2/42 (10 overs)

Canada won by 5 wickets
Maple Leaf Cricket Club, King City
Umpires: Arnold Maddela (Can) and Masudur Rahman (Ban)
Player of the match: Navneet Dhaliwal (Can)

- Nepal won the toss and elected to bat.
- Parveen Kumar (Can) made his ODI debut.
- Aarif Sheikh (Nep) scored his 1,000th run in ODIs.

==== 5th ODI ====
24 September 2024
11:00
Scorecard

Nepal	v	Oman

Match abandoned
Maple Leaf Cricket Club, King City
Umpires: Masudur Rahman (Ban) and Rohan Shah (Can)

- No toss.
- No play was possible due to rain.

==== 6th ODI ====
26 September 2024
11:00
Scorecard

Oman; 198/8 (50 overs)	v	Canada; 199/5 (45.3 overs)
Aqib Ilyas 61 (98); Pargat Singh 2/22 (5 overs)		Pargat Singh 83 (95); Ayaan Khan 2/21 (7 overs)

Canada won by 5 wickets
Maple Leaf Cricket Club, King City
Umpires: Arnold Maddela (Can) and Masudur Rahman (Ban)
Player of the match: Pargat Singh (Can)

- Canada won the toss and elected to field.
- Gurbaz Bajwa (Can) made his ODI debut.
- Kashyap Prajapati (Oma) scored his 1,000th run in ODIs.

== T20I series ==
2024–25 Canada T20I Tri-Nation Series
- Date: 28 September – 3 October 2024
- Location: Canada
- Result: Canada won the series
Teams
Canada	Nepal	Oman
Captains
Nicholas Kirton	Rohit Paudel	Aqib Ilyas
Most runs
Saad Bin Zafar (71)	Rohit Paudel (99)	Aqib Ilyas (112)
Most wickets
Akhil Kumar (5) Parveen Kumar (5) Saad Bin Zafar (5)	Sandeep Lamichhane (8)	Aqib Ilyas (8)

=== Squads ===
Canada	Nepal	Oman
Nicholas Kirton (c); Dilpreet Bajwa; Navneet Dhaliwal; Dillon Heyliger; Aaron Johnson; Akhil Kumar; Parveen Kumar; Shreyas Movva (wk); Ansh Patel; Saad Bin Zafar; Kaleem Sana; Yuvraj Samra; Ravinderpal Singh; Gurpal Sidhu; Harsh Thaker; Kanwarpal Tathgur	Rohit Paudel (c); Dipendra Singh Airee; Kushal Bhurtel; Rijan Dhakal; Gulsan Jha; Sompal Kami; Karan KC; Dev Khanal; Sandeep Lamichhane; Kushal Malla; Lalit Rajbanshi; Anil Sah (wk); Arjun Saud (wk); Bhim Sharki; Aarif Sheikh; Aasif Sheikh (wk)	Aqib Ilyas (c); Shakeel Ahmed; Pratik Athavale (wk); Fayyaz Butt; Khalid Kail; Kaleemullah; Ayaan Khan; Mehran Khan; Shoaib Khan; Zeeshan Maqsood; Hammad Mirza (wk); Jay Odedra; Kashyap Prajapati; Rafiullah; Muzahir Raza; Samay Shrivastava; Bukkapatnam Siddharth; Jatinder Singh

=== Points table ===
Pos	Team	Pld	W	L	NR	Pts	NRR
1	Canada	4	3	1	0	6	0.309
2	Nepal	4	2	2	0	4	0.935
3	Oman	4	1	3	0	2	−1.318

Source: ESPNcricinfo

=== Fixtures ===
28 September 2024
12:00
Scorecard

Canada; 123/8 (20 overs)	v	Nepal; 109 (19 overs)
Saad Bin Zafar 23 (18); Sandeep Lamichhane 3/29 (4 overs)		Rohit Paudel 37 (39); Kaleem Sana 4/26 (4 overs)

Canada won by 14 runs
Maple Leaf Cricket Club, King City
Umpires: Arnold Maddela (Can) and Rohan Shah (Can)
Player of the match: Saad Bin Zafar (Can)

- Nepal won the toss and elected to field.
- Ansh Patel (Can), Rijan Dhakal and Dev Khanal (Nep) all made their T20I debuts.

29 September 2024
12:00
Scorecard

Nepal; 176/6 (20 overs)	v	Oman; 139 (19.1 overs)
Gulsan Jha 40* (17); Aqib Ilyas 3/32 (4 overs)		Shoaib Khan 45 (39); Karan KC 3/36 (4 overs)

Nepal won by 37 runs
Maple Leaf Cricket Club, King City
Umpires: Arnold Maddela (Can) and Rohan Shah (Can)
Player of the match: Gulsan Jha (Nep)

- Oman won the toss and elected to field.

30 September 2024
12:00
Scorecard

Canada; 106 (19.5 overs)	v	Oman; 107/2 (15 overs)
Nicholas Kirton 18 (21); Kaleemullah 2/17 (3.5 overs)		Aqib Ilyas 53 (46); Dillon Heyliger 1/17 (3 overs)

Oman won by 8 wickets
Maple Leaf Cricket Club, King City
Umpires: Arnold Maddela (Can) and Rohan Shah (Can)
Player of the match: Aqib Ilyas (Oma)

- Oman won the toss and elected to field.

1 October 2024
12:00
Scorecard

Nepal; 139/6 (20 overs)	v	Canada; 140/6 (19.3 overs)
Anil Sah 41 (30); Harsh Thaker 2/17 (4 overs)		Saad Bin Zafar 33* (18); Lalit Rajbanshi 2/20 (4 overs)

Canada won by 4 wickets
Maple Leaf Cricket Club, King City
Umpires: Arnold Maddela (Can) and Rohan Shah (Can)
Player of the match: Saad Bin Zafar (Can)

- Canada won the toss and elected to field.

2 October 2024
12:00
Scorecard

Nepal; 157/7 (20 overs)	v	Oman; 101 (17.5 overs)
Rohit Paudel 56* (44); Fayyaz Butt 3/23 (4 overs)		Zeeshan Maqsood 35 (30); Kushal Bhurtel 3/10 (1.5 overs)

Nepal won by 56 runs
Maple Leaf Cricket Club, King City
Umpires: Arnold Maddela (Can) and Rohan Shah (Can)
Player of the match: Rohit Paudel (Nep)

- Oman won the toss and elected to field.

3 October 2024
12:00
Scorecard

Oman; 82 (19.4 overs)	v	Canada; 83/5 (14.1 overs)
Aqib Ilyas 35 (44); Parveen Kumar 3/9 (4 overs)		Nicholas Kirton 20 (13); Kaleemullah 2/15 (3 overs)

Canada won by 5 wickets
Maple Leaf Cricket Club, King City
Umpires: Arnold Maddela (Can) and Rohan Shah (Can)
Player of the match: Parveen Kumar (Can)

- Canada won the toss and elected to field.
- Hammad Mirza and Bukkapatnam Siddharth (Oma) both made their T20I debuts.
