= Papua New Guinean cricket team in Oman in 2023–24 =

International cricket tour

	Oman	Papua New Guinea
- Dates: 6 – 8 March 2024
Captains	Zeeshan Maqsood	Assad Vala

Twenty20 International series
- Results: Oman won the 3-match series 2–1
Most runs	Khalid Kail (88)	Assad Vala (113)
Most wickets	Bilal Khan (4)	Alei Nao (4); Chad Soper (4)

The Papua New Guinea men's cricket team toured Oman in March 2024 to play two unofficial 50-over and three Twenty20 International (T20I) matches. The T20I series provided both teams with preparation for the 2024 ICC Men's T20 World Cup. The 50-over series finished level, with Oman winning the first match and Papua New Guinea winning the second game. Oman won the T20I series 2–1.

== Squads ==
Oman	Papua New Guinea
Zeeshan Maqsood (c); Shakeel Ahmed; Pratik Athavale (wk); Aqib Ilyas; Khalid Kail; Kaleemullah; Ayaan Khan; Bilal Khan; Mehran Khan; Shoaib Khan; Naseem Khushi (wk); Mohammad Nadeem; Kashyap Prajapati; Rafiullah; Jatinder Singh (wk)	Assad Vala (c); Charles Amini; Sese Bau; Kiplin Doriga (wk); Jack Gardner; John Kariko; Semo Kamea; Hiri Hiri; Kabua Morea; Alei Nao; Nosaina Pokana; Chad Soper; Lega Siaka; Tony Ura; Hila Vare (wk); Norman Vanua

== 50-over series ==
=== 1st 50-over match ===
3 March 2024
10:00
Scorecard

Papua New Guinea; 184 (47.5 overs)	v	Oman; 188/6 (38.3 overs)
Kiplin Doriga 67 (68); Bilal Khan 3/31 (7 overs)		Ayaan Khan 53* (68); Kabua Morea 2/27 (7 overs)

Oman won by 4 wickets
Oman Cricket Academy Ground Turf 2, Al Amarat
Umpires: Rahul Asher (Oma) and Azad KR (Oma)
Player of the match: Ayaan Khan (Oma)

- Oman won the toss and elected to field.

=== 2nd 50-over match ===
4 March 2024
10:00
Scorecard

Oman; 243 (49.1 overs)	v	Papua New Guinea; 249/6 (49.1 overs)
Shoaib Khan 59 (53); Chad Soper 3/27 (10 overs)		Lega Siaka 70 (84); Zeeshan Maqsood 2/33 (10 overs)

Papua New Guinea won by 4 wickets
Oman Cricket Academy Ground Turf 1, Al Amarat
Umpires: Parameswaran Balasubramanian (Oma) and Gopakumar Pillai (Oma)
Player of the match: Hiri Hiri (PNG)

- Oman won the toss and elected to bat.

== T20I series ==
=== 1st T20I ===
6 March 2024
11:00
Scorecard

Papua New Guinea; 136/6 (20 overs)	v	Oman; 137/7 (19.3 overs)
Assad Vala 40 (39); Zeeshan Maqsood 2/29 (4 overs)		Kashyap Prajapati 57* (49); Chad Soper 3/26 (3.3 overs)

Oman won by 3 wickets
Oman Cricket Academy Ground Turf 1, Al Amarat
Umpires: Rahul Asher (Oma) and Zaman Quoraishi (Oma)
Player of the match: Zeeshan Maqsood (Oma)

- Oman won the toss and elected to field.
- Khalid Kail (Oma) made his T20I debut.

=== 2nd T20I ===
7 March 2024
11:00
Scorecard

Oman; 145/7 (20 overs)	v	Papua New Guinea; 148/2 (19.2 overs)
Khalid Kail 55 (43); Alei Nao 3/15 (4 overs)		Sese Bau 65* (57); Bilal Khan 1/19 (4 overs)

Papua New Guinea won by 8 wickets
Oman Cricket Academy Ground Turf 1, Al Amarat
Umpires: Rahul Asher (Oma) and Gopakumar Pillai (Oma)
Player of the match: Sese Bau (PNG)

- Papua New Guinea won the toss and elected to field.

=== 3rd T20I ===
8 March 2024
11:00
Scorecard

Papua New Guinea; 127/6 (20 overs)	v	Oman; 128/6 (19 overs)
Hiri Hiri 53* (49); Aqib Ilyas 2/20 (4 overs)		Khalid Kail 32* (37); Kabua Morea 2/26 (4 overs)

Oman won by 4 wickets
Oman Cricket Academy Ground Turf 1, Al Amarat
Umpires: Rahul Asher (Oma) and Parameswaran Balasubramanian (Oma)
Player of the match: Khalid Kail (Oma)

- Oman won the toss and elected to field.
