= 2023 ACC Emerging Teams Asia Cup =

Cricket tournament

- Dates: 13 – 23 July 2023
- Administrator: Asian Cricket Council
- Cricket format: List A
- Tournament format(s): Group round-robin and knockout
- Host: Sri Lanka
- Champions: Pakistan A (2nd title)
- Runners-up: India A
- Participants: 8
- Matches: 15
- Player of the series: (India) Nishant Sindhu
- Most runs: (Sri Lanka) Avishka Fernando (255)
- Most wickets: (India) Nishant Sindhu (11)

The 2023 ACC Emerging Teams Asia Cup was the fifth edition of the ACC Emerging Teams Asia Cup. It took place from 13 to 23 July 2023 in Sri Lanka.

The tournament featured a total of eight teams, which included five 'A' teams from the full members of the Asian Cricket Council; and the top three teams from the 2023 ACC Men's Premier Cup. The 'A' teams from UAE, Oman, and the Nepal national cricket team also participated. Pakistan A won the tournament, defeating India A by 128 runs in the final.

== Teams ==
In January 2023, the Asian Cricket Council (ACC) announced the pathway structure and calendar for 2023 and 2024, where they confirmed the dates and format of the tournament. They later announced the fixtures of the tournament on the first week of July.

Teams
- Afghanistan A
- Bangladesh A
- India A
- Nepal
- Oman A
- Pakistan A
- Sri Lanka A
- United Arab Emirates A

== Squads ==
| Afghanistan A | Bangladesh A | India A | Pakistan A |
|---|---|---|---|
| Shahidullah Kamal (c); Ikram Alikhil (wk); Ishaq Rahimi (wk); Riaz Hassan; Ihsanullah Janat; Noor Ali Zadran; Zubaid Akbari; Bahir Shah; Allah Noor; Sharafuddin Ashraf; Izharulhaq Naveed; Wafadar Momand; Mohammad Ibrahim; Mohammad Saleem; Zia-ur-Rehman; Bilal Sami | Saif Hassan (c); Zakir Hasan (vc, wk); Parvez Hossain Emon (wk); Soumya Sarkar; Mahedi Hasan; Rakibul Hasan; Mrittunjoy Chowdhury; Tanzim Hasan Sakib; Ripon Mondol; Musfik Hasan; Akbar Ali (wk); Naim Sheikh; Mahmudul Hasan Joy; Shahadat Hossain; Tanzid Hasan Tamim | Yash Dhull (c); Abhishek Sharma (vc); Sai Sudharsan; Nikin Jose; Pradosh Ranjan Paul; Riyan Parag; Nishant Sindhu; Prabhsimran Singh (wk); Dhruv Jurel (wk); Manav Suthar; Yuvrajsinh Dodiya; Harshit Rana; Akash Singh; Nitish Kumar Reddy; Rajvardhan Hangargekar | Mohammad Haris (c, wk); Omair Yousuf (vc); Amad Butt; Arshad Iqbal; Haseebullah Khan; Kamran Ghulam; Mehran Mumtaz; Mubasir Khan; Mohammad Wasim Jnr; Qasim Akram; Sahibzada Farhan; Saim Ayub; Shahnawaz Dahani; Sufiyan Muqeem; Tayyab Tahir |
| Sri Lanka A | Nepal | Oman A | United Arab Emirates A |
| Dunith Wellalage (c); Minod Bhanuka (wk); Sahan Arachchige; Ashen Bandara; Lasith Croospulle; Avishka Fernando; Binura Fernando; Dushan Hemantha; Chamika Karunaratne; Janith Liyanage; Pramod Madushan; Lahiru Samarakoon; Pasindu Sooriyabandara; Lahiru Udara; Isitha Wijesundera | Rohit Paudel (c); Arjun Saud(wk); Kushal Bhurtel; Gulsan Jha; Sompal Kami; Pratish GC; Dev Khanal; Sundeep Jora; Kushal Malla; Lalit Rajbanshi; Bhim Sharki; Pawan Sarraf; ~~Aarif Sheikh~~; Aasif Sheikh (wk); Surya Tamang; Kishor Mahato; Mousom Dhakal | Aqib Ilyas (c); Wasim Ali; Muhammed Bilal; Fayyaz Butt; Ayaan khan; Shoaib Khan; Suraj Kumar; Kaleemullah; Jay Odedra; Shubo Pal; Kashyap Prajapati; Rafiullah; Abdul Rauf; Jatinder Singh; Samay Shrivastava | Ali Naseer (c); Ethan D'Souza; Jash Giyanani; Jonathan Figy; Mohammad Faraazuddin; Muhammad Jawadullah; Matiullah Khan; Nilansh Keswani; Fahad Nawaz; Aryansh Sharma; Adhitya Shetty; Sanchit Sharma; Lovepreet Singh; Ansh Tandon; Ashwanth Valthapa |

Prior to the start of the tournament, Nepal's Aarif Sheikh was ruled out of the tournament and was replaced by Pawan Sarraf.

== Group stage ==
Fixtures of the tournament was announced by ACC on 6 July 2023.

=== Group A ===
==== Points table ====
| Pos | Team | Pld | W | L | NR | Pts | NRR |
|---|---|---|---|---|---|---|---|
| 1 | Sri Lanka A | 3 | 2 | 1 | 0 | 4 | 1.693 |
| 2 | Bangladesh A | 3 | 2 | 1 | 0 | 4 | 1.263 |
| 3 | Afghanistan A | 3 | 2 | 1 | 0 | 4 | 0.416 |
| 4 | Oman A | 3 | 0 | 3 | 0 | 0 | −3.243 |

Source: ESPNcricinfo

Advanced to the semi-finals

==== Fixtures ====
13 July 2023
10:00
Scorecard

| Sri Lanka A 349/8 (50 overs) | v | Bangladesh A 301 (48.3 overs) |
| Avishka Fernando 133 (124); Ripon Mondol 3/71 (10 overs) | | Saif Hassan 53 (46); Dushan Hemantha 3/54 (10 overs) |

Sri Lanka A won by 48 runs
Singhalese Sports Club Cricket Ground, Colombo
Umpires: K. N. Ananthapadmanabhan (Ind) and Buddhi Pradhan (Nep)
Player of the match: Avishka Fernando (Sri Lanka A)

- Bangladesh A won the toss and elected to field.

13 July 2023
10:00
Scorecard

| Afghanistan A 267/8 (49 overs) | v | Oman A 195 (40.3 overs) |
| Zubaid Akbari 79 (84); Kaleemullah 2/41 (10 overs) | | Ayaan Khan 47 (48); Mohammad Ibrahim 3/22 (8 overs) |

Afghanistan A won by 72 runs
Colombo Cricket Club Ground, Colombo
Umpires: Faisal Afridi (Pak) and Lyndon Hannibal (SL)
Player of the match: Zubaid Akbari (Afghanistan A)

- Afghanistan A won the toss and elected to bat.
- The match was reduced to 49 overs per side due to wet outfield.
- Rafiullah and Shubo Pal (Oman A) both made their List A debuts.

15 July 2023
10:00
Scorecard

| Oman A 126 (46 overs) | v | Bangladesh A 130/2 (16.3 overs) |
| Ayaan Khan 26 (47); Tanzim Hasan Sakib 4/18 (9 overs) | | Tanzid Hasan 68 (49); Aqib Ilyas 2/17 (2.3 overs) |

Bangladesh A won by 8 wickets
Singhalese Sports Club Cricket Ground, Colombo
Umpires: Faisal Afridi (Pak) and Gamini Dissanayake (SL)
Player of the match: Tanzim Hasan Sakib (Bangladesh A)

- Bangladesh A won the toss and elected to field.
- Muhammed Bilal (Oman A) made his List A debut.

15 July 2023
10:00
Scorecard

| Afghanistan A 252/9 (50 overs) | v | Sri Lanka A 241 (38.5 overs) |
| Riaz Hassan 82 (104); Chamika Karunaratne 3/56 (8 overs) | | Minod Bhanuka 119 (103); Mohammad Ibrahim 4/52 (8 overs) |

Afghanistan A won by 11 runs
Colombo Cricket Club Ground, Colombo
Umpires: Rahul Asher (Oma) and Buddhi Pradhan (Nep)
Player of the match: Minod Bhanuka (Sri Lanka A)

- Sri Lanka A won the toss and elected to field.

18 July 2023
10:00
Scorecard

| Bangladesh A 308/7 (50 overs) | v | Afghanistan A 287/8 (50 overs) |
| Mahmudul Hasan Joy 100 (114); Mohammad Saleem 4/65 (10 overs) | | Riaz Hassan 78 (105); Tanzim Hasan Sakib 3/67 (10 overs) |

Bangladesh A won by 21 runs.
P.Sara oval, Colombo
Umpires: Faisal Afridi (Pak) and Rahul Asher (Oma)
Player of the match: Mahmudul Hasan Joy (Bangladesh A)

- Bangladesh A won the toss and elected to bat.

18 July 2023
14:00 (D/N)
Scorecard

| Sri Lanka A 259/8 (50 overs) | v | Oman A 42 (17.1 overs) |
| Pasindu Sooriyabandara 60 (75); Aqib Ilyas 4/58 (10 overs) | | Kashyap Prajapati 18 (25); Chamika Karunaratne 3/3 (2 overs) |

Sri Lanka A won by 217 runs
R. Premadasa Stadium, Colombo
Umpires: Farooq Khan (Afg) and Buddhi Pradhan (Nep)
Player of the match: Pasindu Sooriyabandara (Sri Lanka A)

- Oman A won the toss and elected to field.
- Samay Shrivastava (Oman A) made his List A debut.
- Afghanistan A was eliminated as a result of this match.

=== Group B ===
==== Points table ====
| Pos | Team | Pld | W | L | T | NR | Pts | NRR |
|---|---|---|---|---|---|---|---|---|
| 1 | India A | 3 | 3 | 0 | 0 | 0 | 6 | 2.928 |
| 2 | Pakistan A | 3 | 2 | 1 | 0 | 0 | 4 | 1.471 |
| 3 | Nepal | 3 | 1 | 2 | 0 | 0 | 2 | −0.751 |
| 4 | United Arab Emirates A | 3 | 0 | 3 | 0 | 0 | 0 | −3.456 |

Source: ESPNcricinfo

Advanced to the semi-finals

==== Fixtures ====
14 July 2023
10:00
Scorecard

| United Arab Emirates A 175/9 (50 overs) | v | India A 179/2 (26.3 overs) |
| Ashwanth Valthapa 46 (107); Harshit Rana 4/41 (9 overs) | | Yash Dhull 108* (84); Ali Naseer 1/14 (4 overs) |

India A won by 8 wickets
Singhalese Sports Club Cricket Ground, Colombo
Umpires: Rahul Asher (Oma) and Morshed Ali Khan (Ban)
Player of the match: Yash Dhull (India A)

- India A won the toss and elected to field.
- Dhruv Jurel, Manav Suthar (India A) and Mohammed Faraazuddin and Jash Giyanani (United Arab Emirates A) all made their List A debuts.
- Yash Dhull (India A) scored his first century in List A.

14 July 2023
10:00
Scorecard

| Nepal; 179 (37 overs) | v | Pakistan A 181/6 (32.5 overs) |
| Sompal Kami 75 (101); Shahnawaz Dahani 5/38 (10 overs) | | Tayyab Tahir 51 (67); Lalit Rajbanshi 3/50 (8.5 overs) |

Pakistan A won by 4 wickets
Colombo Cricket Club Ground, Colombo
Umpires: Gamini Dissanayake (SL) and Aasif Iqbal (UAE)
Player of the match: Shahnawaz Dahani (Pakistan A)

- Nepal won the toss and elected to bat.

17 July 2023
10:00
Scorecard

| Pakistan A 309 (49.2 overs) | v | United Arab Emirates A 125 (29.5 overs) |
| Kamran Ghulam 63 (53); Jash Giyanani 4/50 (10 overs) | | Aryansh Sharma 37 (34); Qasim Akram 6/26 (10 overs) |

Pakistan A won by 184 runs
P.Sara oval, Colombo
Umpires: K. N. Ananthapadmanabhan (Ind) and Morshed Ali Khan (Ban)
Player of the match: Qasim Akram (Pakistan A)

- United Arab Emirates A won the toss and elected to field.
- Sufiyan Muqeem (Pakistan A) and Nilansh Keswani (United Arab Emirates A) both made their List A debuts.
- Qasim Akram (Pakistan A) took his first five-wicket haul in List A.

17 July 2023
14:00 (D/N)
Scorecard

| Nepal; 167 (39.2 overs) | v | India A 172/1 (22.1 overs) |
| Rohit Paudel 65 (85); Nishant Sindhu 4/14 (3.2 overs) | | Abhishek Sharma 87 (69); Rohit Paudel 1/25 (4 overs) |

India A won by 9 wickets
R. Premadasa Stadium, Colombo
Umpires: Lyndon Hannibal (SL) and Aasif Iqbal (UAE)
Player of the match: Abhishek Sharma (India A)

- Nepal won the toss and elected to bat.

19 July 2023
10:00
Scorecard

| United Arab Emirates A 157 (44 overs) | v | Nepal; 159/7 (23 overs) |
| Lovepreet Singh 52 (82); Kushal Bhurtel 6/40 (10 overs) | | Kushal Bhurtel 71 (43); Mohammed Faraazuddin 5/36 (6 overs) |

Nepal won by 3 wickets
P.Sara oval, Colombo
Umpires: K. N. Ananthapadmanabhan (Ind) and Morshed Ali Khan (Ban)
Player of the match: Kushal Bhurtel (Nep)

- United Arab Emirates A won the toss and elected to bat.
- Mousom Dhakal (Nep) made his List A debut.
- Kushal Bhurtel (Nep) took his first five-wicket haul in List A.
- Mohammed Faraazuddin (United Arab Emirates A) took his first five-wicket haul in List A.

19 July 2023
14:00 (D/N)
Scorecard

| Pakistan A 205 (48 overs) | v | India A 210/2 (36.4 overs) |
| Qasim Akram 48 (63); Rajvardhan Hangargekar 5/42 (8 overs) | | Sai Sudharsan 104* (110); Mubasir Khan 1/45 (9 overs) |

India A won by 8 wickets
R. Premadasa Stadium, Colombo
Umpires: Lyndon Hannibal (SL) and Buddhi Pradhan (Nep)
Player of the match: Sai Sudharsan (India A)

- Pakistan A won the toss and elected to bat.

== Knockout stage ==
=== Bracket ===
Semi-finals
A1 | Sri Lanka A | 262 (45.4)
B2 | Pakistan A | 322 (50)
B1 | India A | 211 (49.1)
A2 | Bangladesh A | 160 (34.2)

Final
B2 | Pakistan A | 352/8 (50)
B1 | India A | 224 (40)

ACC

=== Semi-finals ===
==== 1st Semi-final ====
21 July 2023
10:00
Scorecard

| Pakistan A 322 (50 overs) | v | Sri Lanka A 262 (45.4 overs) |
| Omair Yousuf 88 (79); Pramod Madushan 2/56 (10 overs) | | Avishka Fernando 97 (85); Arshad Iqbal 5/37 (7.4 overs) |

Pakistan A won by 60 runs
P.Sara oval, Colombo
Umpires: K. N. Ananthapadmanabhan (Ind) and Buddhi Pradhan (Nep)
Player of the match: Arshad Iqbal (Pakistan A)

- Pakistan A won the toss and elected to bat.

==== 2nd Semi-final ====
21 July 2023
14:00 (D/N)
Scorecard

| India A 211 (49.1 overs) | v | Bangladesh A 160 (34.2 overs) |
| Yash Dhull 66 (85); Rakibul Hasan 2/36 (10 overs) | | Tanzid Hasan 51 (56); Nishant Sindhu 5/20 (8 overs) |

India A won by 51 runs
R. Premadasa Stadium, Colombo
Umpires: Rahul Asher (Oma) and Lyndon Hannibal (SL)
Player of the match: Yash Dhull (India A)

- Bangladesh A won the toss and elected to field.
- Yuvrajsinh Dodiya (India A) made his List A debut.
- Nishant Sindhu (India A) took his first five-wicket haul in List A.

=== Final ===
23 July 2023
14:00 (D/N)
Scorecard

| Pakistan A 352/8 (50 overs) | v | India A 224 (40 overs) |
| Tayyab Tahir 108 (71); Riyan Parag 2/24 (4 overs) | | Abhishek Sharma 61 (51); Sufiyan Muqeem 3/66 (10 overs) |

Pakistan A won by 128 runs
R. Premadasa Stadium, Colombo
Umpires: Lyndon Hannibal (SL) and Buddhi Pradhan (Nep)
Player of the match: Tayyab Tahir (Pakistan A)

- India A won the toss and elected to field.

== Broadcasting ==
Star Sports Network broadcast in Indian Subcontinent. Live Streaming in India on Fancode.

| Location | Television broadcaster(s) | Streaming |
|---|---|---|
| India; Nepal; Sri Lanka; Bangladesh | Cable/satellite (pay): Star Sports (Indian TV network) | Fancode (India only) |
| Oman; Nepal; Afghanistan; Pakistan; UAE | | Asian Cricket Council Official YouTube Channel |

== See also ==
- 2023 ACC Women's T20 Emerging Teams Asia Cup
