= Namibian cricket team in Oman in 2024 =

International cricket tour

Namibia men's cricket team in Oman in 2024
	Oman	Namibia
- Dates: 1 – 7 April 2024
Captains	Zeeshan Maqsood (Note: Aqib Ilyas captained Oman in the third and fourth T20Is.)	Gerhard Erasmus

Twenty20 International series
- Results: Namibia won the 5-match series 3–2
Most runs	Naseem Khushi (149)	Jean-Pierre Kotze (160)
Most wickets	Fayyaz Butt (7)	Gerhard Erasmus (8)

The Namibia men's cricket team toured Oman in April 2024 to play five Twenty20 International (T20I) matches. The series formed part of both teams' preparation for the 2024 ICC Men's T20 World Cup, as well as Oman's preparation for the 2024 ACC Men's Premier Cup tournament.

Namibia won the low-scoring first T20I by 4 wickets. Oman won the next two matches to take a lead in the series, before Namibia eventually won the series 3–2.

== Squads ==
Oman	Namibia
Zeeshan Maqsood (c); Shakeel Ahmed; Pratik Athavale (wk); Fayyaz Butt; Sandeep Goud; Aqib Ilyas; Khalid Kail; Kaleemullah; Ayaan Khan; Bilal Khan; Mehran Khan; Shoaib Khan; Naseem Khushi (wk); Mohammad Nadeem; Kashyap Prajapati; Rafiullah; Samay Shrivastav; Jatinder Singh	Gerhard Erasmus (c, wk); Jack Brassell; Jan Frylinck; Zane Green (wk); Jean-Pierre Kotze; Malan Kruger; Dylan Leicher; Tangeni Lungameni; Bernard Scholtz; Ben Shikongo; Simon Shikongo; Ruben Trumpelmann; Gerhard Janse van Rensburg; David Wiese

== T20I series ==
=== 1st T20I ===
1 April 2024
14:30
Scorecard

Oman; 109/9 (20 overs)	v	Namibia; 114/6 (18.4 overs)
Kashyap Prajapati 33 (29); Tangeni Lungameni 3/13 (4 overs)		Zane Green 26 (29); Fayyaz Butt 3/21 (4 overs)

Namibia won by 4 wickets
Oman Cricket Academy Ground Turf 1, Al Amarat
Umpires: Rahul Asher (Oma) and Vinod Babu (Oma)
Player of the match: Tangeni Lungameni (Nam)

- Namibia won the toss and elected to field.

=== 2nd T20I ===
2 April 2024
14:30
Scorecard

Oman; 137/7 (20 overs)	v	Namibia; 131/9 (20 overs)
Pratik Athavale 38 (26); Gerhard Erasmus 3/7 (3 overs)		Gerhard Erasmus 58 (56); Mehran Khan 3/17 (4 overs)

Oman won by 6 runs
Oman Cricket Academy Ground Turf 1, Al Amarat
Umpires: Rahul Asher (Oma) and Harikrishna Pillai (Oma)
Player of the match: Gerhard Erasmus (Nam)

- Oman won the toss and elected to bat.

=== 3rd T20I ===
4 April 2024
14:30
Scorecard

Namibia; 101/8 (20 overs)	v	Oman; 104/2 (11.1 overs)
Ruben Trumpelmann 26 (20); Aqib Ilyas 2/13 (4 overs)		Naseem Khushi 66 (40); Bernard Scholtz 1/9 (2 overs)

Oman won by 8 wickets
Oman Cricket Academy Ground Turf 1, Al Amarat
Umpires: Vinod Babu (Oma) and Harikrishna Pillai (Oma)
Player of the match: Naseem Khushi (Oma)

- Oman won the toss and elected to field.

=== 4th T20I ===
5 April 2024
14:30
Scorecard

Namibia; 164/4 (20 overs)	v	Oman; 140/9 (20 overs)
Jean-Pierre Kotze 78 (51); Samay Shrivastav 2/20 (3 overs)		Naseem Khushi 34 (14); David Wiese 3/26 (4 overs)

Namibia won by 24 runs
Oman Cricket Academy Ground Turf 1, Al Amarat
Umpires: Rahul Asher (Oma) and Harikrishna Pillai (Oma)
Player of the match: David Wiese (Nam)

- Oman won the toss and elected to field.

=== 5th T20I ===
7 April 2024
14:30
Scorecard

Namibia; 212/3 (20 overs)	v	Oman; 150 (18.3 overs)
Gerhard Erasmus 64* (29); Aqib Ilyas 2/21 (3 overs)		Aqib Ilyas 51 (29); Bernard Scholtz 4/20 (4 overs)

Namibia won by 62 runs
Oman Cricket Academy Ground Turf 1, Al Amarat
Umpires: Rahul Asher (Oma) and Vinod Babu (Oma)
Player of the match: Gerhard Erasmus (Nam)

- Namibia won the toss and elected to bat.
