= 2022 United States Tri-Nation Series (June) =

Cricket tournament

- Part of 2019–2023 ICC Cricket World Cup League 2
- Date: 8–15 June 2022
- Location: United States
- Player of the series: (Nepal) Karan KC
Teams
Nepal	Oman	United States
Captains
Sandeep Lamichhane	Zeeshan Maqsood	Monank Patel
Most runs
Aasif Sheikh (141)	Zeeshan Maqsood (199)	Monank Patel (225)
Most wickets
Karan KC (13)	Zeeshan Maqsood (8)	Ali Khan (10)

The 2022 United States Tri-Nation Series was the 13th round of the 2019–2023 ICC Cricket World Cup League 2 cricket tournament that took place in the United States in June 2022. It was a tri-nation series between Nepal, Oman and the United States cricket teams, with the matches played as One Day International (ODI) fixtures. The ICC Cricket World Cup League 2 forms part of the qualification pathway to the 2023 Cricket World Cup. In April 2022, USA Cricket confirmed all the fixtures for the series, with all the matches taking place at the Moosa Stadium in Pearland.

The third ODI match of the series, between the United States and Nepal, finished as a tie.

== Squads ==
Nepal	Oman	United States
Sandeep Lamichhane (c); Rohit Paudel (vc); Mohammad Aadil Alam; Dipendra Singh Airee; Binod Bhandari; Sushan Bhari; Kushal Bhurtel; Sagar Dhakal; Sunil Dhamala; Sompal Kami; Karan KC; Subash Khakurel; Dev Khanal; Kishore Mahato; Aarif Sheikh; Aasif Sheikh; Bikram Sob	Zeeshan Maqsood (c); Khawar Ali; Fayyaz Butt; Nestor Dhamba; Sandeep Goud; Kaleemullah; Ayaan Khan; Bilal Khan; Shoaib Khan; Naseem Khushi (wk); Suraj Kumar (wk); Mohammad Nadeem; Kashyap Prajapati; Jatinder Singh	Monank Patel (c); Aaron Jones (vc); Rahul Jariwala; Nosthush Kenjige; Ali Khan; ~~Jaskaran Malhotra~~; Sushant Modani; Yasir Mohammad; Saiteja Mukkamalla; Saurabh Netravalkar; Nisarg Patel; Gajanand Singh; Cameron Stevenson; Steven Taylor; Rusty Theron

Jaskaran Malhotra was ruled out of the USA's squad after suffering a fracture in his hand, with Saiteja Mukkamalla named as his replacement. Subash Khakurel was added to the Nepal squad after Kushal Bhurtel and Aasif Sheikh both suffered injuries that left them doubtful for their opening game of the series.

== Fixtures ==
=== 1st ODI ===
8 June 2022
10:30
Scorecard

United States; 323/8 (50 overs)	v	Oman; 209 (43.3 overs)
Monank Patel 130 (101); Khawar Ali 3/46 (10 overs)		Ayaan Khan 59 (60); Ali Khan 5/20 (8.3 overs)

United States won by 114 runs
Moosa Stadium, Pearland
Umpires: Vijaya Mallela (USA) and Leslie Reifer (WI)
Player of the match: Monank Patel (USA)

- Oman won the toss and elected to field.
- Yasir Mohammad (USA) made his ODI debut.
- Ali Khan (USA) took his first five-wicket haul in ODIs.

=== 2nd ODI ===
9 June 2022
10:30
Scorecard

Oman; 211/8 (50 overs)	v	Nepal; 198 (49.4 overs)
Zeeshan Maqsood 104* (126); Karan KC 5/38 (10 overs)		Aarif Sheikh 66 (79); Zeeshan Maqsood 3/37 (10 overs)

Oman won by 13 runs
Moosa Stadium, Pearland
Umpires: Sameer Bandekar (USA) and Jermaine Lindo (USA)
Player of the match: Zeeshan Maqsood (Oma)

- Oman won the toss and elected to bat.
- Sunil Dhamala (Nep) made his ODI debut.
- Karan KC (Nep) took his first five-wicket haul in ODIs.

=== 3rd ODI ===
11 June 2022
10:30
Scorecard

Nepal; 274 (49.2 overs)	v	United States; 274/6 (50 overs)
Rohit Paudel 62 (72); Rusty Theron 4/56 (9.2 overs)		Steven Taylor 114 (123); Mohammad Aadil Alam 3/45 (9 overs)

Match tied
Moosa Stadium, Pearland
Umpires: Vijaya Mallela (USA) and Leslie Reifer (WI)
Player of the match: Steven Taylor (USA)

- Nepal won the toss and elected to bat.
- Mohammad Aadil Alam (Nep) made his ODI debut.
- Steven Taylor (USA) scored his first century in ODIs.

=== 4th ODI ===
12 June 2022
10:30
Scorecard

Oman; 280/4 (50 overs)	v	United States; 267/9 (50 overs)
Kashyap Prajapati 103 (115); Nosthush Kenjige 1/41 (10 overs)		Aaron Jones 97 (112); Zeeshan Maqsood 4/39 (10 overs)

Oman won by 13 runs
Moosa Stadium, Pearland
Umpires: Sameer Bandekar (USA) and Leslie Reifer (WI)
Player of the match: Kashyap Prajapati (Oma)

- Oman won the toss and elected to bat.
- Kashyap Prajapati (Oma) scored his first century in ODIs.

=== 5th ODI ===
14 June 2022
10:30
Scorecard

Oman; 163 (46.5 overs)	v	Nepal; 167/3 (33.1 overs)
Zeeshan Maqsood 52 (100); Karan KC 5/33 (9 overs)		Aasif Sheikh 62 (86); Fayyaz Butt 2/33 (7 overs)

Nepal won by 7 wickets
Moosa Stadium, Pearland
Umpires: Jermaine Lindo (USA) and Vijaya Mallela (USA)
Player of the match: Karan KC (Nep)

- Oman won the toss and elected to bat.

=== 6th ODI ===
15 June 2022
10:30
Scorecard

United States; 245/7 (50 overs)	v	Nepal; 206 (47.4 overs)
Gajanand Singh 58 (60); Karan KC 3/67 (9 overs)		Aarif Sheikh 63 (76); Ali Khan 3/32 (8.4 overs)

United States won by 39 runs
Moosa Stadium, Pearland
Umpires: Sameer Bandekar (USA) and Leslie Reifer (WI)
Player of the match: Gajanand Singh (USA)

- Nepal won the toss and elected to field.
