= Bukkapatnam Siddharth =

Indian cricketer (born 1990)

Personal information
- Full name: Bukkapatnam Siddharth Prasad
- Born: 3 October 1990 (age 36); Jamshedpur, India
- Batting: Right-handed
- Bowling: Right-arm offbreak
- Role: Batsman

International information
- National side: Oman
- ODI debut (cap 35): 11 November 2024 v Netherlands
- Last ODI: 16 February 2025 v Namibia
- T20I debut (cap 38): 3 October 2024 v Canada
- Last T20I: 13 November 2024 v Netherlands

Domestic team information
- Years: Team
- 2016: Andhra
- Source: ESPNcricinfo, 29 November 2016

Bukkapatnam Siddharth Prasad (born 3 October 1990) is an Indian-born Omani cricketer who plays for Oman. He is a right-handed batsman and right-arm offbreak bowler. He made his first-class debut for Andhra on 29 November 2016. He made his Twenty20 International debut against Canada on 3 October 2024.

== Career ==
He made his first-class debut for Andhra in the 2016-17 Ranji Trophy on 29 November 2016. He made his List A debut for Oman against Afghanistan A on 15 October 2023. He made his T20 debut for Oman against Afghanistan A on 21 October 2024.

He made his Twenty20 International (T20I) debut on his birthday, for Oman against Canada on 3 October 2024 in the 2024 Canada Tri-Nation Series. He made his One Day International (ODI) debut against Netherlands on 11 November 2024 in the Cricket World Cup League 2.
