= 2022 United States Tri-Nation Series =

2022 United States Tri-Nation Series can refer to:

- 2022 United States Tri-Nation Series (round 12), a cricket tournament between Scotland, the UAE and the United States in May and June 2022
- 2022 United States Tri-Nation Series (round 13), a cricket tournament between Nepal, Oman and the United States in June 2022
