= Yuvrajsinh Dodiya =

Indian cricketer (born 2000)

Personal information
- Born: 3 October 2000 (age 25); Junagadh, Gujarat, India
- Batting: Right-handed
- Bowling: Right-arm off-spin
- Role: Bowler

Domestic team information
- Years: Team
- 2022–: Saurashtra
- Source: Cricinfo, 7 July 2023

Yuvrajsinh Dodiya (born 13 October 2000) is an Indian cricketer who plays for Saurashtra in domestic cricket.

He made his first-class debut against Mumbai in the 2022-23 Ranji Trophy on 27 December 2022. In July 2023, he was named in India A squad for 2023 ACC Emerging Teams Asia Cup.

He made his List A debut for India A against Bangladesh A, on 21 July 2023, in the 2023 ACC Emerging Teams Asia Cup.
