= Mohammad Sanuth =

Indian cricketer (born 1989)

Sanuth Ebrahim
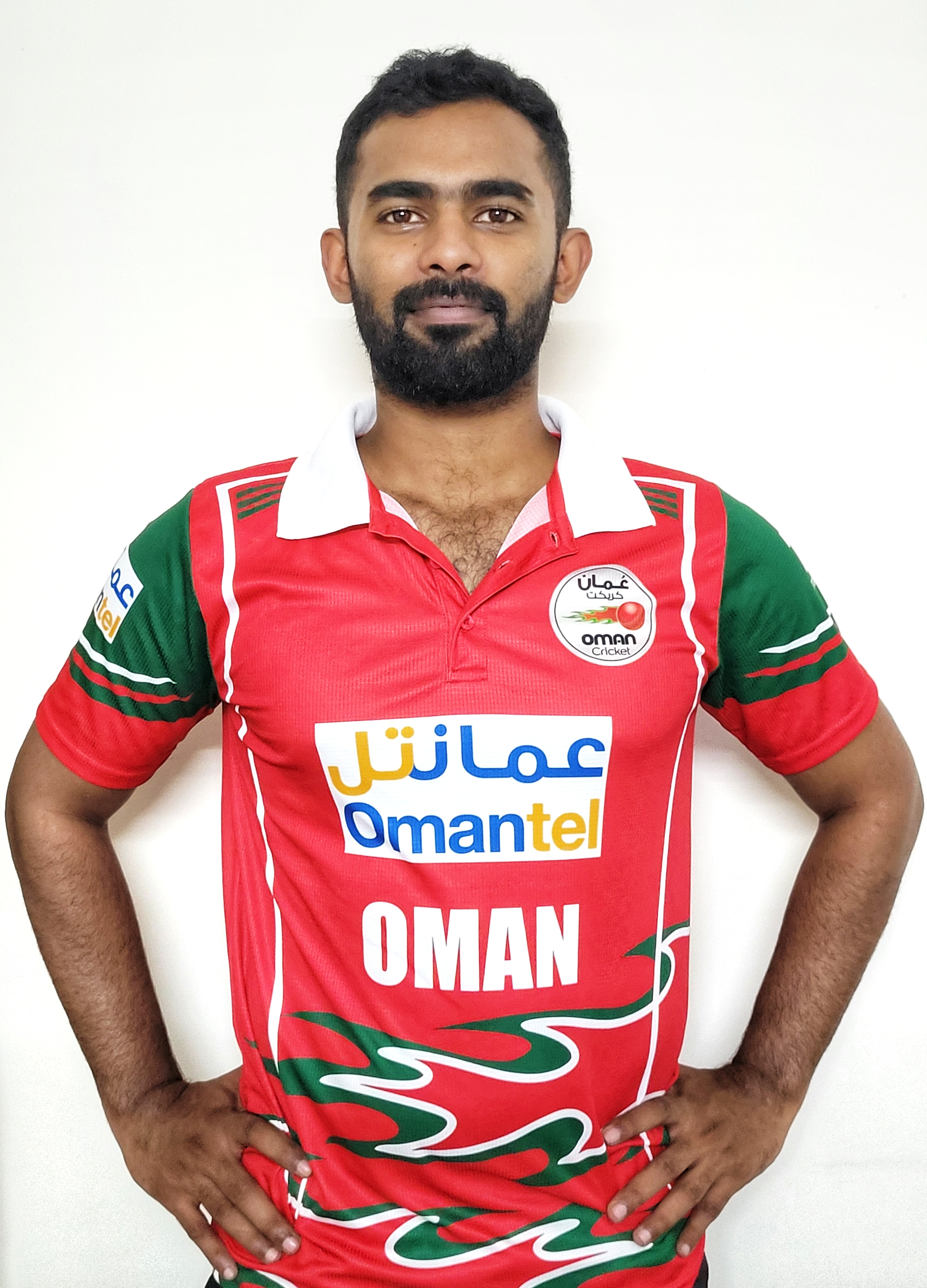

Personal information
- Born: 25 July 1989 (age 37); Thiruvananthapuram, Kerala, India

International information
- National side: Oman
- ODI debut (cap 15): 5 January 2020 v UAE
- Last ODI: 9 February 2020 v Nepal
- Only T20I (cap 27): 23 February 2020 v Bahrain

Domestic team information
- Years: Team
- 2008-11: Kerala
- Source: ESPNcricinfo, 24 February 2020

Sanuth Ebrahim also known as Mohammad Ebrahim Sanuth (born 25 July 1989) is an Indian-born cricketer who plays for the Oman cricket team.

== Career ==
He made his first-class debut on 16 November 2008, for Kerala in the 2008–09 Ranji Trophy. He last played for Kerala in 2011. In November 2019, he was named in Oman's squad for the 2019 ACC Emerging Teams Asia Cup in Bangladesh. The following month, he was named in Oman's One Day International (ODI) squad for the 2020 Oman Tri-Nation Series. He made his ODI debut against the United Arab Emirates, on 5 January 2020.

In February 2020, he was named in the Oman's Twenty20 International (T20I) squad for the 2020 ACC Western Region T20 qualifier tournament. He made his T20I debut for Oman, against Bahrain, on 23 February 2020.
