= Pratik Athavale =

Indian-born cricketer

Personal information
- Full name: Pratik Shrikant Athavale
- Born: 20 April 1997 (age 29); Nashik district, Maharashtra
- Batting: Right-handed
- Role: Batsman, Wicket-Keeper

International information
- National side: Oman
- ODI debut (cap 26): 16 July 2024 v Scotland
- Last ODI: 26 September 2024 v Canada
- T20I debut (cap 35): 30 October 2023 v Malaysia
- Last T20I: 2 October 2024 v Nepal

Career statistics
Competition	ODI	T20I	LA
Matches	7	21	9
Runs scored	103	364	158
Batting average	14.71	22.75	17.55
100s/50s	0/0	0/2	0/1
Top score	34	54	51
Catches/stumpings	6/0	13/7	7/0
- Source: Cricinfo, 17 September 2026

Pratik Shrikant Athavale (born 20 April 1997) is an Indian-born cricketer. He is a right-handed batsman and wicket keeper. He made his T20 International debut against Malaysia on 30 October 2023 and played for Oman at the 2024 Men's T20 World Cup. He made his One Day International on 16 July 2024 against Scotland.

== Career ==
Opening the batting, he hit an unbeaten 50 to help Oman qualify for the 2024 Cricket World Cup with a 10 wicket win over Bahrain in March 2024.

He played as wicket keeper as Oman reached the semi-finals of the ACC Men’s Premier T20I Cup in April 2024. He opened the innings in the final against Nepal as Oman won the competition.

In May 2024, he was subsequently selected to represent Oman at the 2024 Men's T20 World Cup in the United States and West Indies. It marked his debut global tournament for his country. He made his World Cup debut in Oman's second match of the tournament against Australia. His performances at the tournament included top-scoring with a 40-ball innings of 54 against Scotland in Antigua and Barbuda on 10 June.
