= Khalid Kail =

Pakistani-born cricketer

Personal information
- Full name: Khalid Kail
- Born: 13 October 1996 (age 30); Abbottabad, Pakistan
- Batting: Right-handed
- Role: Batsman

International information
- National side: Oman
- ODI debut (cap 27): 16 July 2024 v Scotland
- Last ODI: 18 July 2024 v Namibia
- T20I debut (cap 36): 6 March 2024 v Papua New Guinea
- Last T20I: 3 June 2024 v Namibia

Career statistics
Competition	T20I	LA	T20
Matches	13	4	15
Runs scored	228	45	228
Batting average	32.57	22.50	32.57
100s/50s	0/2	0/0	0/2
Top score	55	25*	55
Catches/stumpings	1/-	2/-	1/-
- Source: Cricinfo, 16 July 2024

Khalid Kail (born 13 October 1996) is a Pakistani-born cricketer. He is a right-handed batsman. He played for Oman at the 2024 ICC Men's T20 World Cup.

== Career ==
He plays domestic cricket for Al Turki NMC and in March 2021 scored 146 not out to help his side to an important win on the final day of the season that clinched the runners-up spot on net run rate in the Premier Division 50-over League. That year, he was named Best Batsman in the league end of season awards.

He made his international debut for Oman in a T20 International series against Papua New Guinea in March 2024. In April 2024, he hit five sixes in an unbeaten half century from 23 balls in a T20 International against the UAE.

In May 2024, he was selected to represent Oman at the 2024 World Cup in the United States and West Indies for his first global tournament. He played in their opening game on 3 June 2024 against Namibia at the Kensington Oval, top-scoring in Oman's innings with 34 runs.
