= Suraj Kumar =

Indian-born cricketer (born 1988)

Personal information
- Born: 29 November 1988 (age 37); Jalandhar, Punjab, India
- Batting: Right-handed
- Role: Wicketkeeper-batsman

International information
- National side: Oman
- ODI debut (cap 10): 27 April 2019 v Namibia
- Last ODI: 12 June 2022 v USA
- T20I debut (cap 26): 5 October 2019 v Hong Kong
- Last T20I: 21 October 2021 v Scotland

Career statistics
Competition	ODI	T20I	LA	T20
Matches	20	17	28	17
Runs scored	328	109	524	109
Batting average	25.23	12.11	27.57	12.22
100s/50s	0/2	0/0	0/5	0/0
Top score	62*	42*	70	42*
Catches/stumpings	16/2	7/2	26/4	7/2
- Source: Cricinfo, 12 June 2022

Suraj Kumar (born 29 November 1988) is an Indian-born cricketer who plays as a wicketkeeper-batsman for the Oman national cricket team.

== Early life ==
Suraj was born in Jalandhar district in the Indian state of Punjab, to a Nepalese immigrant family. His parents were originally from Baglung, Nepal. He moved to Oman as a teenager to work for a company, and started his cricket career there.

== Career ==
In October 2018, he was named in Oman's squad for the 2018 ICC World Cricket League Division Three tournament in Oman. He played in Oman's opening fixture of the tournament, against Kenya on 9 November 2018. In December 2018, he was named in Oman's team for the 2018 ACC Emerging Teams Asia Cup.

He was a member of Oman's team for the 2019 ICC World Cricket League Division Two tournament in Namibia, and made his List A debut against the United States in the same tournament on 20 April 2019. Oman finished in the top four places in the tournament, therefore gaining One Day International (ODI) status. Kumar made his ODI debut for Oman on 27 April 2019, against Namibia, in the tournament's final.

In September 2019, he was named in Oman's squads for the 2019–20 Oman Pentangular Series and the 2019 ICC T20 World Cup Qualifier tournament. He made his Twenty20 International (T20I) debut for Oman, against Hong Kong, on 5 October 2019. In November 2019, he was named in Oman's squad for the 2019 ACC Emerging Teams Asia Cup in Bangladesh. In September 2021, he was named in Oman's squad for the 2021 ICC Men's T20 World Cup.

In July 2023, Kumar played in a World Cup Qualifying match against the West Indies and was the top-scorer of the match.
