= Rafiullah (cricketer) =

Omani cricketer

Personal information
- Born: 16 August 1996 (age 30); Peshawar, Pakistan
- Batting: Right-handed
- Bowling: Right-arm medium
- Role: All-rounder

International information
- National side: Oman
- T20I debut (cap 32): 14 November 2022 v Saudi Arabia
- Last T20I: 21 April 2024 v UAE

Career statistics
Competition	T20I	List A
Matches	27	2
Runs scored	281	5
Batting average	15.61	2.50
100s/50s	0/0	0/0
Top score	32	3
Balls bowled	288	36
Wickets	12	1
Bowling average	38.00	49.00
5 wickets in innings	0	0
10 wickets in match	0	0
Best bowling	4/25	1/29
Catches/stumpings	18/–	0/–
- Source: Cricinfo, 31 May 2024

Rafiullah (Arabic: رفيع الله; born 16 August 1996) is a Pakistan-born cricketer who plays for the Oman national cricket team. He is a right-handed batsman and right-arm medium pace bowler. He made his Twenty20 International debut on 14 November 2022 against Saudi Arabia.

== Career ==
Described as an all-rounder, he has played domestic cricket for Assarain, and the Oman Stallions in the Premier Division League and the Gulf T20I Cricket Championship.

In July 2023, he was called up to the Oman national cricket team for the Emerging Nations Asia Cup in Sri Lanka.

He was part of record seventh-wicket stand with Ayaan Khan which helped the Oman in the semi-finals of the ACC Men’s Premier T20I Cup in April 2024.

In May 2024, he was selected to represent Oman at the 2024 ICC Men's T20 World Cup tournament.
