= Naseem Khushi =

Pakistani-born cricketer (born 1982)

Personal information
- Full name: Muhammad Naseem Khushi
- Born: 11 August 1982 (age 44); Sialkot, Punjab, Pakistan
- Batting: Right-handed
- Role: Wicket-keeper

International information
- National side: Oman (2017–2023)
- ODI debut (cap 16): 5 January 2020 v UAE
- Last ODI: 14 June 2022 v Nepal
- T20I debut (cap 20): 15 January 2017 v Netherlands
- Last T20I: 5 November 2023 v Nepal

Career statistics
Competition	ODI	T20I
Matches	25	24
Runs scored	303	189
Batting average	16.83	13.50
100s/50s	0/0	0/0
Top score	42	29
Catches/stumpings	18/2	7/2
- Source: Cricinfo, 27 November 2022

Naseem Khushi (born 11 August 1982) is a Pakistani-born cricketer who plays for the Oman national cricket team as a wicket-keeper.

== Early life ==
Naseem Khushi was born on 11 August 1982 in Sialkot, Pakistan.

== Career ==
Khushi made his Twenty20 International (T20I) debut for Oman in the 2017 Desert T20 Challenge against the Netherlands on 15 January 2017.

In January 2018, he was named in Oman's squad for the 2018 ICC World Cricket League Division Two tournament. He made his List A debut for Oman on 15 February 2018. In August 2018, he was named in Oman's squad for the 2018 Asia Cup Qualifier tournament. In September 2019, he was named in Oman's squad for the 2019 ICC T20 World Cup Qualifier tournament. In November 2019, he was named in Oman's squad for the 2019 ACC Emerging Teams Asia Cup in Bangladesh. The following month, he was named in Oman's One Day International (ODI) squad for the 2020 Oman Tri-Nation Series. He made his ODI debut in Oman's five-wicket win against the United Arab Emirates, on 5 January 2020.

In September 2021, he was named in Oman's squad for the 2021 ICC Men's T20 World Cup. In May 2024, he was named in Oman's squad for the 2024 ICC Men's T20 World Cup tournament.
