= Shoaib Khan (cricketer, born 1992) =

Omani cricketer

Personal information
- Born: 6 December 1992 (age 33); Madhya Pradesh, India
- Role: Batsman

International information
- National side: Oman
- ODI debut (cap 20): 14 September 2021 v Nepal
- Last ODI: 29 April 2023 v United Arab Emirates
- T20I debut (cap 30): 11 February 2022 v Nepal
- Last T20I: 21 November 2022 v Canada

Career statistics
Competition	ODI	T20I
Matches	12	6
Runs scored	354	136
Batting average	32.18	22.66
100s/50s	1/3	0/1
Top score	105*	57
Balls bowled	48	–
Wickets	0	0
Bowling average	–	–
5 wickets in innings	–	–
10 wickets in match	–	–
Best bowling	–	–
Catches/stumpings	9/–	2/–
- Source: Cricinfo, 29 April 2023

Shoaib Khan (born 6 December 1992) is an Indian-born cricketer who plays for the Oman cricket team.

== Career ==
In September 2021, he was named in Oman's One Day International (ODI) squad for round six and round seven of the 2019–2023 ICC Cricket World Cup League 2. He made his ODI debut on 14 September 2021 against Nepal.

In February 2022, he was named in Oman's Twenty20 International (T20I) squad for the 2021–22 Oman Quadrangular Series. He made his T20I debut on 11 February 2022, against Nepal. In March 2022, in the fifth match of the 2022 United Arab Emirates Tri-Nation Series, Khan scored his first century in ODI cricket, with 105 not out.

In May 2024, he was subsequently selected to represent Oman at the 2024 ICC Men's T20 World Cup in the United States and West Indies. Khan played in the T20 World Cup matched against Australia on 6 June and England on 13 June.
