= Kashyap Prajapati =

Indian-born cricketer

Personal information
- Full name: Kashyapkumar Harishbhai Prajapati
- Born: 11 October 1995 (age 31); Kheda, Gujarat, India
- Batting: Right-handed
- Bowling: Right-arm offbreak
- Role: Top order batter

International information
- National side: Oman
- ODI debut (cap 23): 26 September 2021 v PNG
- Last ODI: 29 June 2023 v Zimbabwe
- T20I debut (cap 29): 17 October 2021 v PNG
- Last T20I: 5 November 2023 v Nepal

Career statistics
Competition	ODI	T20I
Matches	21	11
Runs scored	623	194
Batting average	31.15	24.25
100s/50s	2/4	0/2
Top score	103	74*
Catches/stumpings	7/–	6/–
- Source: ESPNcricinfo, 17 November 2023

Kashyap Prajapati (born 11 October 1995) is an Indian-born cricketer who plays for the Oman cricket team. In September 2021, he was named in Oman's One Day International (ODI) squad for round seven of the 2019–2023 ICC Cricket World Cup League 2. He made his ODI debut on 26 September 2021, against Papua New Guinea. He made his Twenty20 International (T20I) debut on 17 October 2021, also against Papua New Guinea, in the opening match of the 2021 ICC Men's T20 World Cup.

On 12 June 2022, in round 13 of the 2019–2023 ICC Cricket World Cup League 2 tournament, Prajapati scored his first century in ODI cricket, with 103 against the United States.

In May 2024, he was named in Oman's squad for the 2024 ICC Men's T20 World Cup tournament.
