= List of Oman Twenty20 International cricketers =

This is a list of Oman Twenty20 International cricketers. A Twenty20 International (T20I) is an international cricket match between two representative teams, each having ODI status, as determined by the International Cricket Council (ICC). A T20l is played under the rules of Twenty20 cricket. This list is arranged in the order in which each player won his first Twenty20 cap. Where more than one player won his first Twenty20 cap in the same match, they are listed alphabetically by surname.

Oman were first granted T20I status in July 2015, after making the top six teams at the 2015 World Twenty20 Qualifier. The team's debut in the format came in its last match of the tournament, the fifth-place play-off against Afghanistan. Oman lost the match, played at Castle Avenue, Dublin, by five wickets. Oman were guaranteed to maintain their T20I status until 2019. In April 2018, the ICC granted full T20I status to all its members, starting from 1 January 2019. Therefore, Oman will retain its T20I status.

== Key ==
General

- ‡ – Captain
- † – Wicket-keeper
- First – Year of debut
- Last – Year of latest game
- Mat – Number of matches played

Batting

- Runs – Runs scored in career
- HS – Highest score
- Avg – Runs scored per dismissal
- 50s – Number of half centuries
- 100 – Centuries scored
- * – Batsman remained not out

Bowling

- Wkt – Wickets taken in career
- BBI – Best bowling in an innings
- Ave – Average runs per wicket

Fielding

- Ca – Catches taken
- St – Stumpings affected

== List of players ==
Last updated 8 June 2026

Oman T20I cricketers
| General | | | | | Batting | | | | | Bowling | | | | Fielding | | Ref |
| No. | Name | First | Last | Mat | Runs | HS | Avg | 50 | 100 | Balls | Wkt | BBI | Ave | Ca | St | Ref |
|---|---|---|---|---|---|---|---|---|---|---|---|---|---|---|---|---|
| 1 | Aamir Kaleem | 2015 | 2026 | 58 | 779 | 72* | 17.70 | 3 | 0 | 755 | 49 | 5/15 | 19.40 | 22 | 0 | |
| 2 | Amir Ali | 2015 | 2016 | 10 | 97 | 32* | 19.40 | 0 | 0 | 54 | 1 | 1/6 | 67.00 | 1 | 0 | |
| 3 | Munis Ansari | 2015 | 2016 | 11 | 5 | 3* | – | 0 | 0 | 227 | 8 | 3/37 | 41.75 | 0 | 0 | |
| 4 | Jatinder Singh‡ | 2015 | 2026 | 76 | 1,635 | 73* | 23.69 | 9 | 0 | 13 | 0 | – | – | 23 | 0 | |
| 5 | Khawar Ali‡ | 2015 | 2022 | 41 | 626 | 72* | 19.56 | 2 | 0 | 716 | 46 | 4/11 | 17.17 | 15 | 0 | |
| 6 | Mehran Khan | 2015 | 2024 | 48 | 344 | 29 | 10.42 | 0 | 0 | 558 | 35 | 3/7 | 18.88 | 9 | 0 | |
| 7 | Mohammad Nadeem | 2015 | 2026 | 73 | 824 | 77* | 21.12 | 3 | 0 | 933 | 40 | 4/23 | 30.02 | 25 | 0 | |
| 8 | Rajesh Ranpura | 2015 | 2016 | 3 | 5 | 5* | – | 0 | 0 | 36 | 3 | 2/17 | 10.66 | 0 | 0 | |
| 9 | Sultan Ahmed‡† | 2015 | 2017 | 17 | 104 | 37* | 11.55 | 0 | 0 | – | – | – | – | 14 | 3 | |
| 10 | Zeeshan Maqsood‡ | 2015 | 2024 | 73 | 1,369 | 102* | 26.32 | 5 | 1 | 1,082 | 51 | 4/7 | 22.90 | 14 | 0 | |
| 11 | Zeeshan Siddiqui | 2015 | 2015 | 5 | 60 | 33* | 15.00 | 0 | 0 | – | – | – | – | 2 | 0 | |
| 12 | Adnan Ilyas | 2015 | 2016 | 12 | 258 | 54 | 23.45 | 1 | 0 | – | – | – | – | 5 | 0 | |
| 13 | Aqib Ilyas‡ | 2017 | 2024 | 56 | 1,330 | 90 | 27.70 | 10 | 0 | 738 | 47 | 4/10 | 15.85 | 19 | 0 | |
| 14 | Bilal Khan | 2015 | 2024 | 79 | 28 | 6* | 3.50 | 0 | 0 | 1,698 | 110 | 4/19 | 17.44 | 12 | 0 | |
| 15 | Ajay Lalcheta‡ | 2015 | 2019 | 17 | 101 | 20 | 12.62 | 0 | 0 | 309 | 8 | 1/13 | 46.75 | 5 | 0 | |
| 16 | Sufyan Mehmood | 2015 | 2026 | 30 | 268 | 40* | 16.75 | 0 | 0 | 519 | 25 | 3/26 | 29.04 | 9 | 0 | |
| 17 | Vaibhav Wategaonkar | 2016 | 2016 | 2 | 14 | 14 | 14.00 | 0 | 0 | – | – | – | – | 1 | 0 | |
| 18 | Kaleemullah | 2017 | 2024 | 42 | 114 | 15 | 8.14 | 0 | 0 | 773 | 33 | 3/23 | 27.93 | 6 | 0 | |
| 19 | Khurram Nawaz | 2017 | 2022 | 24 | 257 | 58 | 19.76 | 1 | 0 | – | – | – | – | 5 | 0 | |
| 20 | Naseem Khushi† | 2017 | 2024 | 51 | 696 | 69 | 19.33 | 3 | 0 | – | – | – | – | 19 | 5 | |
| 21 | Arun Poulose | 2017 | 2017 | 3 | 9 | 9 | 3.00 | 0 | 0 | – | – | – | – | 2 | 0 | |
| 22 | Fayyaz Butt | 2019 | 2024 | 47 | 148 | 25* | 13.45 | 0 | 0 | 904 | 51 | 3/16 | 22.70 | 9 | 0 | |
| 23 | Jay Odedra | 2019 | 2026 | 11 | 40 | 25* | 40.00 | 0 | 0 | 180 | 7 | 2/13 | 31.71 | 1 | 0 | |
| 24 | Sandeep Goud | 2019 | 2024 | 30 | 153 | 31* | 11.76 | 0 | 0 | 84 | 4 | 2/36 | 28.00 | 10 | 0 | |
| 25 | Wasim Ali | 2019 | 2026 | 17 | 247 | 38 | 19.00 | 0 | 0 | 150 | 4 | 2/20 | 42.50 | 5 | 0 | |
| 26 | Suraj Kumar† | 2019 | 2022 | 19 | 119 | 42* | 13.22 | 0 | 0 | – | – | – | – | 11 | 2 | |
| 27 | Mohammad Sanuth | 2020 | 2020 | 1 | 5 | 5 | 5.00 | 0 | 0 | – | – | – | – | 0 | 0 | |
| 28 | Ayaan Khan‡ | 2021 | 2024 | 42 | 607 | 53* | 18.96 | 1 | 0 | 336 | 8 | 2/16 | 55.37 | 24 | 0 | |
| 29 | Kashyap Prajapati | 2021 | 2024 | 47 | 843 | 74* | 20.56 | 6 | 0 | 8 | 0 | – | – | 22 | 0 | |
| 30 | Shoaib Khan | 2022 | 2024 | 28 | 361 | 57 | 18.05 | 1 | 0 | – | – | – | – | 11 | 0 | |
| 31 | Nestor Dhamba | 2022 | 2022 | 1 | 3 | 3 | 3.00 | 0 | 0 | 18 | 0 | – | – | 0 | 0 | |
| 32 | Rafiullah | 2022 | 2024 | 32 | 323 | 33 | 14.68 | 0 | 0 | 312 | 13 | 4/25 | 38.23 | 20 | 0 | |
| 33 | Samay Shrivastava | 2022 | 2025 | 20 | 48 | 22* | 24.00 | 0 | 0 | 324 | 16 | 5/18 | 26.93 | 3 | 0 | |
| 34 | Shakeel Ahmed | 2023 | 2026 | 47 | 266 | 45 | 14.00 | 0 | 0 | 954 | 38 | 3/15 | 27.97 | 5 | 0 | |
| 35 | Pratik Athavale† | 2023 | 2024 | 21 | 364 | 54 | 22.75 | 2 | 0 | – | – | – | – | 13 | 7 | |
| 36 | Khalid Kail | 2024 | 2024 | 21 | 294 | 55 | 21.00 | 2 | 0 | – | – | – | – | 1 | 0 | |
| 37 | Hammad Mirza‡† | 2024 | 2026 | 27 | 477 | 62* | 19.08 | 3 | 0 | – | – | – | – | 10 | 1 | |
| 38 | Bukkapatnam Siddharth | 2024 | 2025 | 3 | 5 | 5 | 1.66 | 0 | 0 | 19 | 0 | – | – | 1 | 0 | |
| 39 | Muzahir Raza | 2024 | 2025 | 6 | 14 | 8* | – | 0 | 0 | 114 | 8 | 3/42 | 20.50 | 0 | 0 | |
| 40 | Ashish Odedara | 2024 | 2026 | 8 | 45 | 15 | 5.62 | 0 | 0 | – | – | – | – | 1 | 0 | |
| 41 | Vinayak Shukla† | 2024 | 2026 | 23 | 447 | 52* | 26.29 | 2 | 0 | – | – | – | – | 8 | 2 | |
| 42 | Karan Sonavale | 2024 | 2026 | 6 | 70 | 20 | 11.66 | 1 | 0 | 9 | 0 | – | – | 2 | 0 | |
| 43 | Hassnain Shah | 2025 | 2025 | 4 | 1 | 1 | 0.33 | 0 | 0 | 72 | 2 | 1/17 | 54.50 | 3 | 0 | |
| 44 | Mujibur Ali | 2025 | 2025 | 3 | 26 | 12 | 8.66 | 0 | 0 | 6 | 0 | – | – | 1 | 0 | |
| 45 | Muhammed Imran | 2025 | 2025 | 2 | 1 | 1* | 1.00 | 0 | 0 | 33 | 4 | 3/23 | 10.50 | 0 | 0 | |
| 46 | Jiten Ramanandi | 2025 | 2026 | 15 | 86 | 19 | 8.60 | 0 | 0 | 244 | 17 | 3/22 | 19.29 | 1 | 0 | |
| 47 | Bilal Shah | 2025 | 2025 | 1 | 1 | 1* | – | 0 | 0 | 12 | 0 | – | – | 1 | 0 | |
| 48 | Shah Faisal | 2025 | 2026 | 14 | 34 | 9* | 8.50 | 0 | 0 | 300 | 15 | 3/34 | 24.46 | 2 | 0 | |
| 49 | Zikria Islam | 2025 | 2025 | 6 | 4 | 4* | 2.00 | 0 | 0 | 36 | 1 | 1/4 | 34.00 | 2 | 0 | |
| 50 | Aryan Bisht | 2025 | 2025 | 9 | 132 | 34 | 22.00 | 0 | 0 | 18 | 0 | – | – | 5 | 0 | |
| 51 | Nadeem Khan | 2025 | 2026 | 11 | 84 | 30* | 16.80 | 0 | 0 | 240 | 13 | 4/20 | 18.53 | 1 | 0 | |
| 52 | Hasnain Ul Wahab | 2025 | 2025 | 1 | 1 | 1 | 1.00 | 0 | 0 | – | – | – | – | 0 | 0 | |
| 53 | Narayan Saishiv | 2025 | 2025 | 1 | 31 | 31 | 31.00 | 0 | 0 | – | – | – | – | 0 | 0 | |
| 54 | Shafiq Jan | 2025 | 2026 | 2 | 0 | 0 | 0.00 | 0 | 0 | 36 | 2 | 2/28 | 29.00 | 1 | 0 | |
| 55 | Sufyan Yousaf† | 2025 | 2025 | 1 | 2 | 2 | 2.00 | 0 | 0 | – | – | – | – | 0 | 1 | |
| 56 | Abdul Jalil | 2026 | 2026 | 4 | 27 | 16 | 9.00 | 0 | 0 | – | – | – | – | 0 | 0 | |
| 57 | Ahmed Al Zadjali | 2026 | 2026 | 2 | 7 | 7 | 7.00 | 0 | 0 | 6 | 0 | – | – | 0 | 0 | |
| 58 | Issa Al Balushi | 2026 | 2026 | 4 | 16 | 10 | 8.00 | 0 | 0 | – | – | – | – | 0 | 0 | |
| 59 | Mohammed Al Balushi | 2026 | 2026 | 5 | 171 | 81 | 34.20 | 1 | 0 | 12 | 0 | – | – | 2 | 0 | |
| 60 | Muzaffar Shiralkar† | 2026 | 2026 | 5 | 42 | 36 | 8.40 | 0 | 0 | – | – | – | – | 2 | 0 | |
| 61 | Nawed Al Balushi | 2026 | 2026 | 5 | 12 | 10* | 6.00 | 0 | 0 | 60 | 6 | 4/22 | 17.66 | 2 | 0 | |
| 62 | Sameer Othman | 2026 | 2026 | 5 | 0 | 10* | 0.00 | 0 | 0 | 102 | 5 | 2/34 | 34.80 | 1 | 0 | |
| 63 | Shuaib Al Balushi | 2026 | 2026 | 5 | 97 | 40 | 19.40 | 0 | 0 | 66 | 3 | 1/13 | 32.00 | 1 | 0 | |
| 64 | Wasim Al Balushi | 2026 | 2026 | 5 | 16 | 9* | 5.33 | 0 | 0 | 36 | 1 | 1/12 | 99.00 | 1 | 0 | |
| 65 | Zubair Al Balushi | 2026 | 2026 | 5 | 92 | 40 | 18.40 | 0 | 0 | 60 | 0 | – | – | 2 | 0 | |
| 66 | Rashad Al Balushi | 2026 | 2026 | 3 | 0 | 0 | 0.00 | 0 | 0 | 2 | 0 | – | – | 2 | 0 | |
| 67 | Faris Al Balushi | 2026 | 2026 | 1 | 10 | 10* | – | 0 | 0 | 6 | 0 | – | – | 0 | 0 | |
| 68 | Munthir Al Balushi | 2026 | 2026 | 1 | 4 | 4 | 4.00 | 0 | 0 | – | – | – | – | 0 | 0 | |

== See also ==
- List of Oman ODI cricketers
