= Ayaan Khan =

Omani cricketer (born 1992)

Personal information
- Full name: Ayaan Mohammed Khan
- Born: 30 August 1992 (age 34); Bhopal, Madhya Pradesh, India
- Batting: Left-handed
- Role: Bowler
- Relatives: Aslam Sher Khan (cousin)

International information
- National side: Oman
- ODI debut (cap 18): 14 September 2021 v Nepal
- Last ODI: 29 April 2023 v United Arab Emirates
- T20I debut (cap 28): 17 October 2021 v PNG
- Last T20I: 5 November 2023 v Nepal

Career statistics
| Competition | ODI | T20I |
|---|---|---|
| Matches | 21 | 7 |
| Runs scored | 589 | 77 |
| Batting average | 32.72 | 12.83 |
| 100s/50s | 0/4 | 0/0 |
| Top score | 83 | 22 |
| Balls bowled | 664 | 60 |
| Wickets | 19 | 1 |
| Bowling average | 25.47 | 63.00 |
| 5 wickets in innings | 0 | 0 |
| 10 wickets in match | 0 | 0 |
| Best bowling | 4/36 | 1/29 |
| Catches/stumpings | 6/– | 4/– |
- Source: ESPNcricinfo, 29 April 2023

Ayaan Khan (born 30 August 1992) is an Indian-born cricketer who plays for the Oman cricket team.

== Career ==
He made his Twenty20 debut on 10 January 2016, for Madhya Pradesh in the 2015–16 Syed Mushtaq Ali Trophy tournament in India. While playing for the Muscat Cricket Team, Khan twice won Oman Cricket's player of the month award. In September 2021, Khan won the player of the match award for his performance in a one-day match against Mumbai. Later the same month, Khan was one of only two uncapped players to be named in Oman's squad for the 2021 ICC Men's T20 World Cup. He was also included in Oman's One Day International (ODI) squad for their tri-series in Oman. He made his ODI debut on 14 September 2021, for Oman against Nepal. He made his Twenty20 International (T20I) debut on 17 October 2021, against Papua New Guinea. On 3 July 2023, Khan scored his first ODI century, against the Netherlands in an ICC Cricket World Cup Qualifier.

In May 2024, he was named in Oman's squad for the 2024 ICC Men's T20 World Cup tournament. In 2024, Khan played in the World Cup games against Australia on 5 June, Scotland on 9 June, scoring 41, and England on 13 June.

During the 2024 Oman Canada tour, Khan played in the ODI game on 26 September against Canada and in the T20I game on 2 October against Nepal.
