= Oman national cricket team =

Men's sports team representing Oman

Oman
- Association: Oman Cricket

Personnel
- Captain: Vinayak Shukla
- Coach: Sulakshan Kulkarni

International Cricket Council
- ICC status: Affiliate (2000); Associate Member with ODI status (2014)
- ICC region: Asia
ICC Rankings	Current	Best-ever
ODI	16th	13th (1 May 2020)
T20I	20th	14th (20 Oct 2019)

One Day Internationals
- First ODI: v. Namibia at Wanderers Cricket Ground, Windhoek; 27 April 2019
- Last ODI: v. United Arab Emirates at ICC Academy Ground, Dubai; 4 November 2026
ODIs	Played	Won/Lost
Total	82	37/41 (2 ties, 2 no result)
This year	17	4/13 (0 ties, 0 no results)
- World Cup Qualifier appearances: 3 (first in 2005)
- Best result: 6th (2023)

T20 Internationals
- First T20I: v. Afghanistan at Castle Avenue, Dublin; 25 July 2015
- Last T20I: v. Hong Kong at Kōrogi Sports Park, Nisshin; 25 September 2026
T20Is	Played	Won/Lost
Total	120	54/63 (2 ties, 1 no result)
This year	10	2/8 (0 ties, 0 no results)
- T20 World Cup appearances: 4 (first in 2016)
- Best result: Group stage (2016, 2021, 2024)
- T20 World Cup Qualifier appearances: 5 (Note: For the 2024 and 2026 Men's T20 World Cups, the final round of qualification in Asia was the ICC Asia Regional Final.) (first in 2012)
- Best result: Champions (2023)
ODI & T20I kit
- As of 4 November 2026

The Oman men's national cricket team represents the country of Oman in international matches and is governed by Oman Cricket, which became an affiliate member of the International Cricket Council (ICC) in 2000, and gained associate status in 2014. The national side has played matches at the Twenty20 International level. On 24 April 2019, Oman achieved One-Day International status for the first time until 2023, after they beat tournament hosts Namibia by four wickets in 2019 ICC World Cricket League Division Two.

Oman's first competitive matches came during the 2002 ACC Trophy, and the side has since participated in many Asian Cricket Council tournaments, finishing as runners-up in the 2004 ACC Trophy and twice winning the ACC Twenty20 Cup. Oman has participated in ICC World Cup Qualifier without qualifying for the final tournament, placing ninth at the 2005 ICC Trophy and eleventh at the 2009 World Cup Qualifier. In July 2015, with their win against Namibia in the 2015 ICC World Twenty20 Qualifier, Oman gained Twenty20 International status and qualified for 2016 ICC World Twenty20 in India, its first major international tournament.

In April 2018, the ICC decided to grant full Twenty20 International (T20I) status to all its members. Therefore, all Twenty20 matches played between Oman and other ICC Members after 1 January 2019 have the T20I status.

Most cricket in Oman is played by expatriate Indians and Pakistanis (and their descendants), rather than by native Omanis – in 2010, only 100 of the 780 players (around 13 per cent) in the national league were Arabs.

== History ==
=== Early years and ICC Membership ===
Oman became an affiliate member of the ICC in 2000. Their senior international debut came at the 2002 ACC Trophy where they failed to progress beyond the first round, with their only win coming against Qatar. A huge improvement was shown in the 2004 tournament when they reached the final, where they lost against the United Arab Emirates. This qualified them for the 2005 ICC Trophy, the final qualification stage for the 2007 World Cup. It also qualified them for the Asia Cup in 2006. Later in 2004, they won the Middle East Cup after a tied game against Bahrain. They won the tournament as they beat Bahrain in the group stage. In the 2014 ACC Premier League in Malaysia they reached 4th place with three wins.

=== 2005 ICC Trophy and aftermath ===
In 2005, Oman became the first affiliate member of the ICC to compete in the ICC Trophy. Despite being the mystery men of the tournament, they lost all their group games, but then won their play-off games against Uganda and the USA, the latter when they successfully chased down a mammoth target of 345, featuring an unbroken 127-run partnership for the eighth wicket. This gave them ninth place out of the twelve teams in the competition, enough to earn a place in Division Two of the ICC World Cricket League in 2007.

2006 saw a drop in form for Oman, as they were eliminated in the first round of the ACC Trophy, with their only win coming against the Maldives. As mentioned above, they were originally scheduled to participate in the Asia Cup in 2006, playing their first ODIs against Pakistan and India. However, this tournament was postponed until 2008, and the ACC decided to use the 2006 ACC Trophy as a qualification tournament, meaning that Oman's place was taken by Hong Kong.

=== 2007–2013 ===
In October/November 2007, Oman took part in the inaugural ACC Twenty20 Cup held in Kuwait, where they played in Group A against; Afghanistan, Malaysia, Nepal and Qatar. Oman finished in the top two of their group and qualified for the semi-final stage. Oman beat Kuwait in their semi-final, then shared the tournament after the final match against Afghanistan was tied.

In November 2007, Oman travelled to Namibia to take part in Division Two of the ICC World Cricket League. They played Denmark, the hosts and the UAE in addition to the two qualifiers from Division Three; Uganda and Argentina. Although Oman won all their group matches, they lost to the UAE in the final. On the basis of their top four finish in this tournament, Oman qualified for the ICC World Cup Qualifier in 2009, the final tournament in qualification for the 2011 World Cup.

In January 2009, Oman participated in the ACC Cup, Challenge tournament in Chiang Mai, Thailand. They came first with ease, defeating the Maldives and Bhutan in the Semi finals and finals respectively. The fourth favourites to win the cup were hosts, Thailand who ended up in fourth place.

In April 2009, Oman travelled to South Africa to participate in the ICC World Cup Qualifier, the final tournament in qualification for the 2011 World Cup. During the tournament Oman finished last in their group and in the 11th place playoff they beat Denmark by 5 wickets.

In the 2009 ACC Twenty20 Cup, Oman were drawn in Group B. In the group stages of the competition it won all five of its games, finishing top of the group and qualifying for the semi-finals. In the semi-finals it lost to the United Arab Emirates, therefore missing out on a chance to win back-to-back titles. In the third place playoff, it defeated Kuwait. This victory enabled Oman to claim the final qualifying spot for the cricket tournament at the 2010 Asian Games. They played in 2011 ICC World Cricket League Division Three, where they came 3rd to remain in 2013 ICC World Cricket League Division Three.

=== 2014 onwards: Associate Membership and ODI and T20I status ===
At the ICC Annual Conference, held in Melbourne, Australia, in June 2014, the Oman Cricket Board was upgraded from an affiliate member of the ICC to an associate member. That announcement came during the 2014 WCL Division Four, where Oman placed fifth to be relegated to the 2016 Division Five event. Despite the team's poor performance in the 50-over format, Oman went on to win its next major international tournament, the 2015 ACC Twenty20 Cup, thus qualifying for 2015 World Twenty20 Qualifier in Ireland and Scotland.

By defeating Namibia in a sudden-death match at the World Twenty20 Qualifier, Oman reached the top six teams at the tournament, thus qualifying for the 2016 World Twenty20 and gaining Twenty20 International status until at least 2019. The team made its T20I debut in the fifth-place play-off against Afghanistan, and later in the year played bilateral T20I series against Afghanistan, Hong Kong, and United Arab Emirates.

25 July
10:00
Scorecard

Oman; 127/9 (20 overs)	v	Afghanistan; 130/5 (18.5 overs)
Khawar Ali 21 (26); Dawlat Zadran 2/21 (4 overs)		Najibullah Zadran 44 (34); Rajesh Ranpura 2/17 (4 overs)

Afghanistan won by 5 wickets
Clontarf Cricket Club Ground, Dublin
Umpires: Gregory Brathwaite (WI) and Anil Chaudhary (Ind)
Player of the match: Najibullah Zadran (Afg)

- Afghanistan won the toss and elected to field.
- Oman's first T20I match.
- Aamir Kaleem, Aamer Ali, Munis Ansari, Jatinder Singh, Khawar Ali, Mehran Khan, Mohammad Nadeem, Rajesh Ranpura, Sultan Ahmed, Zeeshan Maqsood and Zeeshan Siddiqui (all Oman) made their T20I debuts.

In 2016 Oman appeared at the 2016 World Twenty20 in India where they recorded an upset victory over Ireland.

9 March
19:30 (D/N)
Scorecard

Ireland; 154/5 (20 overs)	v	Oman; 157/8 (19.4 overs)
Gary Wilson 38 (34); Munis Ansari 3/37 (4 overs)		Zeeshan Maqsood 38 (33); Andy McBrine 2/15 (3 overs)

Oman won by 2 wickets
Himachal Pradesh Cricket Association Stadium, Dharamshala
Umpires: Chris Gaffaney (NZ) and Nigel Llong (Eng)
Player of the match: Amir Ali (Oman)

- Ireland won the toss and elected to bat.
- This was Oman's first victory in an ICC World T20 tournament.

They also appeared at the 2016 Asia Cup Qualifier.

In January 2017 Oman took part in the 2017 Desert T20 Challenge. They reached the semi-finals of the tournament by beating Hong Kong in the group stages, before being defeated by Afghanistan.

In April 2019, Oman gained ODI status for the first time, until at least 2022.

27 April 2019
09:30
Scorecard

Namibia; 226/7 (50 overs)	v	Oman; 81 (29 overs)
Karl Birkenstock 61 (108); Fayyaz Butt 2/28 (6 overs)		Suraj Kumar 27 (61); Jan Frylinck 5/13 (8 overs)

Namibia won by 145 runs
Wanderers Cricket Ground, Windhoek
Umpires: David Odhiambo (Ken) and Claire Polosak (Aus)
Player of the match: Jan Frylinck (Nam)

- Namibia won the toss and elected to bat.
- Stephan Baard, Karl Birkenstock, Gerhard Erasmus, Jan Frylinck, Zane Green, Jean-Pierre Kotze, Bernard Scholtz, JJ Smit, Christi Viljoen, Craig Williams, Pikky Ya France (Nam), Aqib Ilyas, Bilal Khan, Fayyaz Butt, Jatinder Singh, Kaleemullah, Khawar Ali, Khurram Nawaz, Mohammad Nadeem, Sandeep Goud, Suraj Kumar and Zeeshan Maqsood (Oma) and all made their ODI debuts.
- Claire Polosak (Aus) became the first female to umpire in a men's ODI.
- First ever ODI match for Oman.

On 19 June 2023, Oman played their first-ever ODI match against a test playing nation. Oman faced Ireland in 4th match of the 2023 Cricket World Cup Qualifier. They restricted Ireland to a score of 281/7 in 50 overs, and they chased down this target in 48.1 overs thanks to Kashyap Prajapati's 72 (74). This marked Oman's first ODI victory against a full member nation.

19 June 2023
09:00
Scorecard

Ireland; 281/7 (50 overs)	v	Oman; 285/5 (48.1 overs)
George Dockrell 91* (89); Bilal Khan 2/64 (10 overs)		Kashyap Prajapati 72 (74); Josh Little 2/47 (10 overs)

Oman won by 5 wickets
Bulawayo Athletic Club, Bulawayo
Umpires: Iknow Chabi (Zim) and Aleem Dar (Pak)
Player of the match: Zeeshan Maqsood (Oma)

- Oman won the toss and elected to field.
- First ever ODI win for Oman against a test-playing nation.

== International grounds ==
Locations of all stadiums which have hosted international cricket matches within Oman

== Current squad ==
This lists all players who were in the most recent ODI or T20I squads.
Updated as on 21 February 2026

Name	Age	Batting style	Bowling style	Forms	Notes
Batters
Jatinder Singh	37	Right-handed	Right-arm off break	ODI & T20I	Captain
Ashish Odedara	35	Right-handed		ODI & T20I	
Karan Sonavale	31	Right-handed	Right-arm off break	T20I	
Khalid Kail	30	Right-handed		ODI & T20I	
All-rounders
Aamir Kaleem	44	Left-handed	Slow left-arm orthodox	ODI & T20I	
Bilal Shah	28	Right-handed	Right-arm medium	T20I	
Wasim Ali	27	Left-handed	Slow left-arm orthodox	ODI & T20I	
Aryan Bisht	22	Right-handed	Right-arm medium	ODI & T20I	
Mohammad Nadeem	44	Right-handed	Right-arm medium-fast	ODI & T20I	
Sufyan Mehmood	35	Right-handed	Right-arm medium	ODI & T20I	
Rafiullah	30	Right-handed	Right-arm medium-fast	ODI & T20I	
Nadeem Khan	25	Left-handed	Slow left-arm orthodox	ODI & T20I	
Muzahir Raza	24	Right-handed	Right-arm medium	ODI & T20I	
Wicket-keepers
Hammad Mirza	28	Right-handed	Right-arm off break	ODI & T20I	
Vinayak Shukla	32	Right-handed		ODI & T20I	
Spin Bowlers
Jay Odedra	37	Right-handed	Right-arm off break	ODI & T20I	
Shakeel Ahmed	38	Left-handed	Slow left-arm orthodox	ODI & T20I	
Samay Shrivastava	35	Right-handed	Right-arm Leg break	ODI & T20I	
Pace Bowlers
Hasnain Shah	27	Right-handed	Right-arm medium-fast	ODI & T20I	
Jiten Ramanandi	32	Left-handed	Left-arm medium	ODI & T20I	
Shah Faisal	29	Left-handed	Left-arm medium-fast	T20I	

== Coaching staff ==
Position	Name
Head coach	Duleep Mendis
Batting coach	Khawar Ali
Bowling coach	Mohammad Sanuth
Fielding coach	Khurram Nawaz
Physiotherapist	Elliott Diamond
Strength and conditioning coach	Munis Ansari
Analyst	Zeeshan Siddiqui

== Tournament history ==
Legend

- Champions
- Runners-up
- Third place/Semi-finals
- Hosts
- Q Qualified/Advanced to next stage
- DNQ Did not qualify
- ▲ Promoted
- Remained in the same division
- ▼ Relegated

=== Cricket World Cup ===
Cricket World Cup record								Qualification record				
Year	Round	Position	Pld	W	L	T	NR	Pld	W	L	T	NR
(England) 1975	Not invited							No qualifiers held				
(England) 1979	Not an ICC member							Not an ICC member				
(England) (Wales) 1983	Not an ICC member							Not an ICC member				
(India) (Pakistan) 1987	Not an ICC member							Not an ICC member				
(Australia) (New Zealand) 1992	Not an ICC member							Not an ICC member				
(India) (Pakistan) (Sri Lanka) 1996	Not an ICC member							Not an ICC member				
(England) (Wales) (Scotland) (Republic of Ireland) (Netherlands) 1999	Not an ICC member							Not an ICC member				
(South Africa) (Zimbabwe) (Kenya) 2003	Did not enter							Did not enter				
(Cricket West Indies) 2007	Did not qualify							13	7	6	0	0
(India) (Sri Lanka) (Bangladesh) 2011	Did not qualify							7	2	5	0	0
(Australia) (New Zealand) 2015	Did not qualify							12	7	5	0	0
(England) (Wales) 2019	Did not qualify							30	18	11	0	1
(India) 2023	Did not qualify							45	23	20	1	1
(South Africa) (Zimbabwe) (Namibia) 2027	To be determined							24*	13	11	1	3
Total	—N/a	0/13	–	–	–	–	–	131	70	58	2	5

=== Cricket World Cup Qualifier ===
Cricket World Cup Qualifier record
Year	Round	Position	Pld	W	L	T	NR	Qual.
(Sri Lanka) 1979	Not an ICC member							
(England) 1982	Not an ICC member							
(England) 1986	Not an ICC member							
(Netherlands) 1990	Not an ICC member							
(Kenya) 1994	Not an ICC member							
(Malaysia) 1997	Not an ICC member							
(Canada) 2001	Not eligible; ICC affiliate member							
(Ireland) 2005	Play-offs	9/12	7	2	5	0	0	DNQ
(South Africa) 2009	Play-offs	11/12	7	2	5	0	0	DNQ
(New Zealand) 2014	Did not qualify							
(Zimbabwe) 2018	Did not qualify							
(Zimbabwe) 2023	Super Six	6/10	9	2	7	0	0	DNQ
2027	To be determined							
Total	0 Titles	3/13	23	6	17	0	0	—N/a

=== Men's T20 World Cup ===
Men's T20 World Cup record								Qualification record				
Year	Round	Position	Pld	W	L	T	NR	Pld	W	L	T	NR
(South Africa) 2007	Not eligible							Not eligible				
(England) 2009	Not eligible							Not eligible				
(Cricket West Indies) 2010	Not eligible							Not eligible				
(Sri Lanka) 2012	Did not qualify							14	5	9	0	0
(Bangladesh) 2014	Did not qualify							4	1	3	0	0
(India) 2016	First round	14/16	3	1	1	0	1	13	8	4	0	1
(United Arab Emirates) (Oman) 2021	First round	13/16	3	1	2	0	0	9	5	4	0	0
(Australia) 2022	Did not qualify							5	2	3	0	0
(United States) (Cricket West Indies) 2024	Group Stage	20/20	4	0	3	1	0	5	5	0	0	0
(India) (Sri Lanka) 2026	Group Stage	20/20	4	0	4	0	0	6	5	1	0	0
(Australia) (New Zealand) 2028	To be determined							To be determined				
Total	0 Titles	4/10	14	2	10	1	1	56	31	24	0	1

=== T20 World Cup Qualifier ===
Men's T20 World Cup Qualifier record
Year	Round	Position	Pld	W	L	T	NR	Qual.
(Ireland) 2008	Not eligible							
(United Arab Emirates) 2010	Not eligible							
(United Arab Emirates) 2012	Play-offs	15/16	8	1	7	0	0	DNQ
(United Arab Emirates) 2013	Did not qualify							
(Ireland) (Scotland) 2015	Play-offs	6/14	8	4	3	0	1	Q
(United Arab Emirates) 2019	Play-offs	9/14	9	5	4	0	0	Q
(Oman) 2022 (A)	Fourth place	4/8	5	2	3	0	0	DNQ
(To be determined) 2028	Qualified							
Total	0 Titles	4/8	30	12	17	0	1	—N/a

=== Asia Cup ===
Asia Cup record
Year	Round	Position	Pld	W	L	T	NR
(United Arab Emirates) 1984	Not eligible; not an ACC member						
(Sri Lanka) 1986	Not eligible; not an ACC member						
(Bangladesh) 1988	Not eligible; not an ACC member						
(India) 1990	Not eligible; not an ACC member						
(United Arab Emirates) 1995	Not eligible; not an ACC member						
(Sri Lanka) 1997	Not eligible; not an ACC member						
(Bangladesh) 2000	Not eligible; not an ACC member						
(Sri Lanka) 2004	Did not enter						
(Pakistan) 2008	Did not qualify						
(Sri Lanka) 2010	No qualification						
(Bangladesh) 2012	No qualification						
(Bangladesh) 2014	No qualification						
(Bangladesh) 2016	Did not qualify						
(United Arab Emirates) 2018	Did not qualify						
(United Arab Emirates) 2022	Did not qualify						
(Pakistan) (Sri Lanka) 2023	Did not qualify						
(United Arab Emirates) 2025	Group Stage	8/8	3	0	3	0	0
Total	0 Titles	1/17	3	0	3	0	0

=== Asian Games ===
Asian Games record
Year	Round	Position	Pld	W	L	T	NR
(China) 2010	Did not participate						
(South Korea) 2014	Did not participate						
(China) 2022	Did not participate						
(Japan) 2026	Group Stage	9/10	2	0	1	0	1
Total	1/4	0 Titles	2	0	1	0	1

=== Other global tournaments ===
CWC League 2 (ODI)	World Cricket League (LA/OD/ODI)
2019–23: Runners-up (Q); 2024–26: In progress	2007 (Division Two) : Runners-up (▼); 2011 (Division Three) : 3rd place; 2013 (Division Three) : 5th place (▼); 2014 (Division Four) : 5th place (▼); 2016 (Division Five) : Runners-up (▲); 2016 (Division Four) : Runners-up (▲); 2017 (Division Three) : Winners (▲); 2018 (Division Two) : 5th place (▼); 2018 (Division Three) : Winners (▲); 2019 (Division Two) : Runners-up

=== Other regional tournaments ===
T20WC Asia/Asia-EAP Regional Final (T20I)	ACC Premier Cup/Asia Cup Qualifier (OD/T20I)	ACC Trophy (OD)
2019: Advanced directly; 2021: Advanced directly; 2023: Winners (Q); 2025: Runners-up (Q)	2016 : 3rd place (DNQ); 2018 : 3rd place (DNQ); 2022 : Did not qualify; 2023 : 3rd place (DNQ); 2024 : Runners-up (Q); 2026 : Qualified	1996 to 2000: Not eligible; 2002: Group stage; 2004: 2nd place; 2006: 11th place; 2009 (Challenge): Winners; 2010 (Elite): 5th place; 2012 (Elite): 6th place
ACC Twenty20 Cup (T20)	ACC Premier League (OD)	Gulf Championship (T20I)
2007: Winners – tied with Afghanistan; 2009: 3rd place; 2011: 3rd place; 2013: Group stage; 2015: Winners	2014: 4th place	2023: Winners; 2024: 4th place

== Records and statistics ==
International match summary — Oman

Last updated 4 November 2026

Playing record
Format	M	W	L	T	NR	Inaugural match
One-Day Internationals	82	37	41	2	2	27 April 2019
Twenty20 Internationals	120	54	63	2	1	25 July 2015

=== One-Day Internationals ===
- Highest team total: 318/9 v. Zimbabwe on 29 June 2023 at Queens Sports Club, Bulawayo.
- Highest individual score: 118*, Jatinder Singh v. Papua New Guinea on 12 April 2022 at Dubai International Cricket Stadium, Dubai.
- Best bowling figures in an innings: 5/15, Khawar Ali v. Papua New Guinea on 1 October 2021 at Oman Cricket Academy Ground Turf 1, Muscat.

Most ODI runs for Oman

Player	Runs	Average	Career span
Jatinder Singh	2,362	31.49	2019–2026
Zeeshan Maqsood	1,273	30.30	2019–2024
Aqib Ilyas	1,234	44.07	2019–2024
Ayaan Khan	1,072	29.77	2021–2024
Kashyap Prajapati	1,048	29.11	2021–2024

Most ODI wickets for Oman

Player	Wickets	Average	Career span
Bilal Khan	101	20.97	2019–2024
Shakeel Ahmed	62	16.41	2024–2026
Zeeshan Maqsood	58	27.15	2019–2024
Khawar Ali	42	30.11	2019–2022
Kaleemullah	42	35.28	2019-2024

ODI record versus other nations

Records complete to ODI #5059. Last updated 4 November 2026.

Opponent	M	W	L	T	NR	First match	First win
v. Full members
Ireland	1	1	0	0	0	19 June 2023	19 June 2023
Sri Lanka	1	0	1	0	0	23 June 2023	
West Indies	1	0	1	0	0	5 July 2023	
Zimbabwe	1	0	1	0	0	29 June 2023	
v. Associate Members
Canada	6	3	3	0	0	20 September 2024	19 May 2025
Namibia	13	5	8	0	0	27 April 2019	27 November 2021
Nepal	13	6	7	0	0	5 February 2020	5 February 2020
Netherlands	5	2	3	0	0	3 July 2023	5 November 2024
Papua New Guinea	6	6	0	0	0	14 August 2019	14 August 2019
Scotland	10	2	6	0	2	15 August 2019	15 August 2019
United Arab Emirates	15	6	8	1	0	5 January 2020	5 January 2020
United States	10	6	3	1	0	6 February 2020	6 February 2020

=== Twenty20 Internationals ===
- Highest team total: 220/5 v. Bahrain on 19 November 2022 at Oman Cricket Academy Ground Turf 1, Muscat.
- Highest individual score: 102*, Zeeshan Maqsood v. Bahrain on 19 November 2022 at Oman Cricket Academy Ground Turf 1, Muscat.
- Best bowling figures in an innings: 5/15, Aamir Kaleem v. Nepal on 10 October 2019 at Oman Cricket Academy Ground Turf 1, Muscat.

Most T20I runs for Oman

Player	Runs	Average	Career span
Jatinder Singh	1,635	23.69	2015–2026
Zeeshan Maqsood	1,369	26.32	2015–2024
Aqib Ilyas	1,330	27.70	2015–2024
Kashyap Prajapati	843	20.56	2021–2024
Mohammed Nadeem	824	21.12	2015–2026

Most T20I wickets for Oman

Player	Wickets	Average	Career span
Bilal Khan	110	17.74	2015–2024
Fayyaz Butt	51	22.70	2019–2024
Zeeshan Maqsood	51	22.90	2015–2024
Aamir Kaleem	49	19.40	2015–2026
Aqib Ilyas	47	15.85	2015–2024

T20I record versus other nations

Records complete to T20I #4144. Last updated 25 September 2026.

Opponent	M	W	L	T	NR	First match	First win
v. Full Members
Afghanistan	5	0	5	0	0	25 July 2015	
Australia	2	0	2	0	0	5 June 2024	
Bangladesh	2	0	2	0	0	13 March 2016	
England	1	0	1	0	0	13 June 2024	
India	1	0	1	0	0	19 September 2025	
Ireland	7	2	5	0	0	9 March 2016	9 March 2016
Pakistan	1	0	1	0	0	12 September 2025	
Sri Lanka	1	0	1	0	0	12 February 2026	
Zimbabwe	1	0	1	0	0	9 February 2026	
v. Associate Members
Bahrain	8	6	2	0	0	23 February 2020	23 February 2020
Cambodia	1	1	0	0	0	14 April 2024	14 April 2024
Canada	7	3	4	0	0	25 October 2019	25 October 2019
Hong Kong	11	8	3	0	0	21 November 2015	21 November 2015
Japan	1	0	1	0	0	17 October 2025	17 October 2025
Jersey	1	0	1	0	0	27 October 2019	
Kuwait	5	4	1	0	0	22 September 2023	22 September 2023
Malaysia	2	1	1	0	0	30 October 2023	30 October 2023
Maldives	1	1	0	0	0	25 February 2020	25 February 2020
Namibia	7	2	4	1	0	29 October 2019	2 April 2024
Nepal	10	2	7	1	0	10 October 2019	10 October 2019
Netherlands	7	2	4	0	1	11 March 2016	9 October 2019
Nigeria	1	1	0	0	0	23 October 2019	23 October 2019
Papua New Guinea	5	4	1	0	0	17 October 2021	17 October 2021
Philippines	1	1	0	0	0	21 February 2022	21 February 2022
Qatar	4	3	1	0	0	24 February 2020	17 September 2023
Samoa	1	1	0	0	0	8 October 2025	8 October 2025
Saudi Arabia	4	3	1	0	0	14 November 2022	14 November 2022
Singapore	2	2	0	0	0	31 October 2023	31 October 2023
Scotland	5	0	5	0	0	19 January 2017	
United Arab Emirates	12	6	6	0	0	22 November 2015	18 October 2019
United States	3	0	3	0	0	20 February 2025	

== Controversies ==
=== Prize money controversy ===
Following Oman's participation in the 2024 ICC Men's T20 World Cup, the team finished in the 13th–20th position, earning US$225,000 in prize money from the ICC. According to ICC regulations, the prize money was to be distributed to the players within 21 days. However, as of mid-2025, the players have not received their share of the prize money. Several players, including Kashyap Prajapati and Fayyaz Butt, publicly raised concerns and subsequently lost their contracts, had their visas revoked, and were forced to leave Oman. The ICC has confirmed that the funds were paid to Oman Cricket but has stated that it has limited authority to enforce the payments to players. The incident has drawn attention to ongoing governance and transparency issues in associate cricket nations.

== See also ==
- Cricket in Oman
- List of Oman ODI cricketers
- List of Oman Twenty20 International cricketers
