= Oman at the Men's T20 World Cup =

Tournament Performance

The Oman national cricket team is one of the associate members of the International Cricket Council (ICC). They qualified for their first T20 World Cup in 2016 after finishing sixth in the 2015 qualifier, during which they defeated Ireland to get their first ever victory in the tournament. They have managed to qualify for two editions since then, in 2021 and 2024.

Oman have been unsuccessful in making it past the first stage of the tournament in all the three editions. They have an overall win–loss record of 2–7 from 10 matches.

== T20 World Cup record ==
| Men's T20 World Cup record | | | | | | | | | | | Qualification record (Note: WCL Division One served as the qualifier for the 2007 edition. For subsequent events, only the final qualification event is considered.) | | | | |
| Year | Round | Position | Pld | W | L | T+W | T+L | NR | Ab (Note: Abandoned matches are not counted in the official records.) | Captain | Pld | W | L | T | NR |
|---|---|---|---|---|---|---|---|---|---|---|---|---|---|---|---|
| (South Africa) 2007 | Did not enter | | | | | | | | | | Did not enter | | | | |
| (England) 2009 | Did not enter | | | | | | | | | | Did not enter | | | | |
| (Cricket West Indies) 2010 | Did not enter | | | | | | | | | | Did not enter | | | | |
| (Sri Lanka) 2012 | Did not qualify | | | | | | | | | | 14 | 5 | 9 | 0 | 0 |
| (Bangladesh) 2014 | Did not qualify | | | | | | | | | | 4 | 1 | 3 | 0 | 0 |
| (India) 2016 | First round | 13/16 | 3 | 1 | 1 | 0 | 0 | 1 | 0 | Sultan Ahmed | 13 | 8 | 4 | 0 | 1 |
| (United Arab Emirates) (Oman) 2021 | First round | 13/16 | 3 | 1 | 2 | 0 | 0 | 0 | 0 | Zeeshan Maqsood | 9 | 5 | 4 | 0 | 0 |
| (Australia) 2022 | Did not qualify | | | | | | | | | | 5 | 2 | 3 | 0 | 0 |
| (United States) (Cricket West Indies) 2024 | Group stage | 20/20 | 4 | 0 | 3 | 0 | 1 | 0 | 0 | Aqib Ilyas | 5 | 5 | 0 | 0 | 0 |
| (India) (Sri Lanka) 2026 | Group stage | 20/20 | 4 | 0 | 4 | 0 | 0 | 0 | 0 | Jatinder Singh | 6 | 5 | 1 | 0 | 0 |
| Total | 0 Titles | 4/10 | 14 | 2 | 11 | 0 | 1 | 1 | 0 | —N/a | 56 | 31 | 24 | 0 | 1 |

=== Record by opponents ===
| Opponent | M | W | L | T+W | T+L | NR | Ab | Win % | First played |
|---|---|---|---|---|---|---|---|---|---|
| Australia | 1 | 0 | 1 | 0 | 0 | 0 | 0 | 0.00 | 2024 |
| Bangladesh | 2 | 0 | 2 | 0 | 0 | 0 | 0 | 0.00 | 2016 |
| England | 1 | 0 | 1 | 0 | 0 | 0 | 0 | 0.00 | 2024 |
| Ireland | 2 | 1 | 1 | 0 | 0 | 0 | 0 | 50.00 | 2016 |
| Namibia | 1 | 0 | 0 | 0 | 1 | 0 | 0 | 0.00 | 2024 |
| Netherlands | 1 | 0 | 0 | 0 | 0 | 1 | 0 | — | 2016 |
| Papua New Guinea | 1 | 1 | 0 | 0 | 0 | 0 | 0 | 100 | 2021 |
| Scotland | 2 | 0 | 2 | 0 | 0 | 0 | 0 | 0.00 | 2021 |
| Sri Lanka | 1 | 0 | 1 | 0 | 0 | 0 | 0 | 0.00 | 2026 |
| Zimbabwe | 1 | 0 | 1 | 0 | 0 | 0 | 0 | 0.00 | 2026 |
| Total | 13 | 2 | 9 | 0 | 1 | 1 | 0 | 15.38 | — |
Source: Last Updated: 14 February 2026

== Tournament results ==
=== 2016 World Cup ===
Squad and kit

- Sultan Ahmed (c, wk)
- Zeeshan Maqsood (vc)
- Aamer Ali
- Ajay Lalcheta
- Arun Poulose
- Adnan Ilyas
- Jatinder Singh
- Khawar Ali
- Mehran Khan
- Munis Ansari
- Sufyan Mehmood
- Vaibhav Wategaonkar
- Bilal Khan
- Mohammad Nadeem
- Aamir Kaleem
- Rajeshkumar Ranpura
- Yousuf Mahmood
- Zeeshan Siddiqui

2016 kit

Results

| First round (Group A) | | | | Super 10 | | Semifinal | Final | Overall Result |
| Opposition Result | Opposition Result | Opposition Result | Rank | Opposition Result | Rank | Opposition Result | Opposition Result | Overall Result |
|---|---|---|---|---|---|---|---|---|
| Ireland; W by 2 wickets | Netherlands; No result | Bangladesh; L by 54 runs (DLS) | 3 | Did not advance | | | | First round |
Source: ESPNcricinfo

Scorecards

First round (Group A)

9 March
19:30 (D/N)
Scorecard

| Ireland; 154/5 (20 overs) | v | Oman; 157/8 (19.4 overs) |
| Gary Wilson 38 (34); Munis Ansari 3/37 (4 overs) | | Zeeshan Maqsood 38 (33); Andy McBrine 2/15 (3 overs) |

Oman won by 2 wickets
Himachal Pradesh Cricket Association Stadium, Dharamshala
Umpires: Chris Gaffaney (NZ) and Nigel Llong (Eng)
Player of the match: Amir Ali (Oma)

- Ireland won the toss and elected to bat.
- This was Oman's first victory in an ICC T20 World Cup.

11 March
15:00 (D/N)
Scorecard

| Netherlands | v | Oman |

No result
Himachal Pradesh Cricket Association Stadium, Dharamshala
Umpires: Chris Gaffaney (NZ) and Sundaram Ravi (Ind)

- Oman won the toss and elected to field.
- No play was possible due to rain.

13 March
19:30 (D/N)
Scorecard

| Bangladesh; 180/2 (20 overs) | v | Oman; 65/9 (12 overs) |
| Tamim Iqbal 103* (63); Khawar Ali 1/24 (3 overs) | | Jatinder Singh 25 (20); Shakib Al Hasan 4/15 (3 overs) |

Bangladesh won by 54 runs (DLS method)
Himachal Pradesh Cricket Association Stadium, Dharamshala
Umpires: Chris Gaffaney (NZ) and Rod Tucker (Aus)
Player of the match: Tamim Iqbal (Ban)

- Oman won the toss and elected to field.
- Rain reduced Oman's innings to 12 overs with a target of 120 runs.
- Oman were eliminated as a result of this match .

=== 2021 World Cup ===
Squad and kit

- Zeeshan Maqsood (c)
- Aqib Ilyas (vc)
- Jatinder Singh
- Khawar Ali
- Mohammad Nadeem
- Suraj Kumar (wk)
- Nestor Dhamba
- Kaleemullah
- Naseem Khushi (wk)
- Sufyan Mehmood
- Khurram Nawaz
- Ayaan Khan
- Sandeep Goud
- Bilal Khan
- Fayyaz Butt

2021 kit

Results

| First round (Group B) | | | | Super 10 | | Semifinal | Final | Overall Result |
| Opposition Result | Opposition Result | Opposition Result | Rank | Opposition Result | Rank | Opposition Result | Opposition Result | Overall Result |
|---|---|---|---|---|---|---|---|---|
| Papua New Guinea; W by 10 wickets | Bangladesh; L by 26 runs | Scotland; L by 8 wickets | 3 | Did not advance | | | | First round |
Source: ESPNcricinfo

Scorecards

First round (Group B)

17 October 2021
14:00
Scorecard

| Papua New Guinea; 129/9 (20 overs) | v | Oman; 131/0 (13.4 overs) |
| Assad Vala 56 (43); Zeeshan Maqsood 4/20 (4 overs) | | Jatinder Singh 73* (42) |

Oman won by 10 wickets
Oman Cricket Academy Ground Turf 1, Muscat
Umpires: Kumar Dharmasena (SL) and Chris Gaffaney (NZ)
Player of the match: Zeeshan Maqsood (Oma)

- Oman won the toss and elected to field.

19 October 2021
18:00 (N)
Scorecard

| Bangladesh; 153 (20 overs) | v | Oman; 127/9 (20 overs) |
| Mohammad Naim 64 (50); Bilal Khan 3/18 (4 overs) | | Jatinder Singh 40 (33); Mustafizur Rahman 4/36 (4 overs) |

Bangladesh won by 26 runs
Oman Cricket Academy Ground Turf 1, Muscat
Umpires: Chris Gaffaney (NZ) and Ahsan Raza (Pak)
Player of the match: Shakib Al Hasan (Ban)

- Bangladesh won the toss and elected to bat.

21 October 2021
18:00 (N)
Scorecard

| Oman; 122 (20 overs) | v | Scotland; 123/2 (17 overs) |
| Aqib Ilyas 37 (35); Josh Davey 3/25 (4 overs) | | Kyle Coetzer 41 (28); Fayyaz Butt 1/26 (3 overs) |

Scotland won by 8 wickets
Oman Cricket Academy Ground Turf 1, Muscat
Umpires: Chris Gaffaney (NZ) and Ahsan Raza (Pak)
Player of the match: Josh Davey (Sco)

- Oman won the toss and elected to bat.

=== 2024 World Cup ===
Squad and kit

- Aqib Ilyas (c)
- Zeeshan Maqsood
- Kashyap Prajapati
- Pratik Athavale
- Ayaan Khan
- Shoaib Khan
- Mohammad Nadeem
- Naseem Khushi (wk)
- Mehran Khan
- Bilal Khan
- Rafiullah
- Kaleemullah
- Fayyaz Butt
- Shakeel Ahmed
- Khalid Kail

2024 kit

Results

| Group stage (Group B) | | | | | Super 8 | | Semifinal | Final | Overall Result |
| Opposition Result | Opposition Result | Opposition Result | Opposition Result | Rank | Opposition Result | Rank | Opposition Result | Opposition Result | Overall Result |
|---|---|---|---|---|---|---|---|---|---|
| Namibia; Tied (L the S\O) | Australia; L by 39 runs | Scotland; L by 7 wickets | England; L by 8 wickets | 4 | Did not advance | | | | Group stage |
Source: ESPNcricinfo

Scorecards

Group stage (Group B)

2 June 2024
20:30 UTC−4 (N)
Scorecard

| Oman; 109 (19.4 overs) | v | Namibia; 109/6 (20 overs) |
| Khalid Kail 34 (39); Ruben Trumpelmann 4/21 (4 overs) | | Jan Frylinck 45 (48); Mehran Khan 3/7 (3 overs) |

Match tied (Namibia won the Super Over)
Kensington Oval, Bridgetown
Umpires: Jayaraman Madanagopal (Ind) and Joel Wilson (WI)
Player of the match: David Wiese (Nam)

- Namibia won the toss and elected to field.
- Super Over: Namibia 21/0, Oman 10/1

5 June 2024
20:30 UTC−4 (N)
Scorecard

| Australia; 164/5 (20 overs) | v | Oman; 125/9 (20 overs) |
| Marcus Stoinis 67* (36); Mehran Khan 2/38 (4 overs) | | Ayaan Khan 36 (30); Marcus Stoinis 3/19 (3 overs) |

Australia won by 39 runs
Kensington Oval, Bridgetown
Umpires: Joel Wilson (WI) and Asif Yaqoob (Pak)
Player of the match: Marcus Stoinis (Aus)

- Oman won the toss and elected to field.

9 June 2024
13:00 UTC−4
Scorecard

| Oman; 150/7 (20 overs) | v | Scotland; 153/3 (13.1 overs) |
| Pratik Athavale 54 (40); Safyaan Sharif 2/40 (4 overs) | | Brandon McMullen 61* (31); Bilal Khan 1/12 (2.1 overs) |

Scotland won by 7 wickets
Sir Vivian Richards Stadium, North Sound
Umpires: Chris Brown (NZ) and Allahudien Paleker (SA)
Player of the match: Brandon McMullen (Sco)

- Oman won the toss and elected to bat.
- Oman were eliminated as a result of this match.

13 June 2024
15:00 UTC−4
Scorecard

| Oman; 47 (13.2 overs) | v | England; 50/2 (3.1 overs) |
| Shoaib Khan 11 (23); Adil Rashid 4/11 (4 overs) | | Jos Buttler 24* (8); Kaleemullah 1/10 (1 over) |

England won by 8 wickets
Sir Vivian Richards Stadium, North Sound
Umpires: Langton Rusere (Zim) and Asif Yaqoob (Pak)
Player of the match: Adil Rashid (Eng)

- England won the toss and elected to field.

=== 2026 World Cup ===
Squad and kit

- Jatinder Singh (c)
- Vinayak Shukla (vc, wk)
- Shakeel Ahmed
- Wasim Ali
- Shah Faisal
- Shafiq Jan
- Aamir Kaleem
- Nadeem Khan
- Sufyan Mehmood
- Hammad Mirza (wk)
- Mohammad Nadeem
- Ashish Odedara
- Jay Odedra
- Jiten Ramanandi
- Karan Sonavale
- Note: Hassnain Shah was replaced by Aamir Kaleem due to injury.

2026 kit

Results

| Group stage (Group B) | | | | | Super 8 | | Semifinal | Final | Overall Result |
| Opposition Result | Opposition Result | Opposition Result | Opposition Result | Rank | Opposition Result | Rank | Opposition Result | Opposition Result | Overall Result |
|---|---|---|---|---|---|---|---|---|---|
| Zimbabwe; L by 8 wickets | Sri Lanka; L by 105 runs | Ireland; L by 96 runs | Australia; L by 9 wickets | 5 | Did not advance | | | | Group stage |
Source: ESPNcricinfo

Scorecards

Group stage (Group B)

Match 8
9 February 2026
15:00 UTC+5:30 (D/N)
Scorecard

| Oman; 103 (19.5 overs) | v | Zimbabwe; 106/2 (13.3 overs) |
| Vinayak Shukla 28 (21); Blessing Muzarabani 3/16 (4 overs) | | Brian Bennett 48* (36); Sufyan Mehmood 2/12 (3 overs) |

Zimbabwe won by 8 wickets
Sinhalese Sports Club Cricket Ground, Colombo
Umpires: Wayne Knights (NZ) and Asif Yaqoob (Pak)
Player of the match: Blessing Muzarabani (Zim)

- Zimbabwe won the toss and elected to field.
- This was the first time Oman and Zimbabwe faced each other in T20Is.

Match 16
12 February 2026
11:00 UTC+5:30
Scorecard

| Sri Lanka; 225/5 (20 overs) | v | Oman; 120/9 (20 overs) |
| Kusal Mendis 61 (45); Jiten Ramanandi 2/41 (4 overs) | | Mohammad Nadeem 53* (56); Maheesh Theekshana 2/11 (4 overs) |

Sri Lanka won by 105 runs
Pallekele International Cricket Stadium, Kandy
Umpires: Richard Kettleborough (Eng) and Wayne Knights (NZ)
Player of the match: Pavan Rathnayake (SL)

- Oman won the toss and elected to field.
- This was the first time Oman and Sri Lanka faced each other in T20Is.
- Dasun Shanaka scored the fastest half-century (19 balls) in T20Is for Sri Lanka and equalled with Rohit Sharma for the fastest half-century by a captain in the T20 World Cup.
- Mohammad Nadeem (Oma) became the oldest player (43 years and 161 days) to score a half-century in a Men's T20 World Cup.

Match 22
14 February 2026
11:00 UTC+5:30
Scorecard

| Ireland; 235/5 (20 overs) | v | Oman; 139 (18 overs) |
| Lorcan Tucker 94* (51); Shakeel Ahmed 3/33 (4 overs) | | Aamir Kaleem 50 (29); Josh Little 3/16 (4 overs) |

Ireland won by 96 runs
Sinhalese Sports Club Cricket Ground, Colombo
Umpires: Richard Kettleborough (Eng) and Raveendra Wimalasiri (SL)
Player of the match: Lorcan Tucker (Ire)

- Oman won the toss and elected to field.
- Aamir Kaleem (Oma) became the oldest player (44 years and 86 days) to score a half-century in a Men's T20 World Cup, surpassing Mohammad Nadeem.
- Oman were eliminated as a result of this match.

Match 40
20 February 2026
19:00 UTC+5:30 (N)
Scorecard

| Oman; 104 (16.2 overs) | v | Australia; 108/1 (9.4 overs) |
| Wasim Ali 32 (33); Adam Zampa 4/21 (3.2 overs) | | Mitchell Marsh 64* (33); Shakeel Ahmed 1/29 (4 overs) |

Australia won by 9 wickets
Pallekele International Cricket Stadium, Kandy
Umpires: Kumar Dharmasena (SL) and Chris Gaffaney (NZ)
Player of the match: Adam Zampa (Aus)

- Australia won the toss and elected to field.
- Glenn Maxwell (Aus) took his 50th wicket in T20Is. This was also the last T20I for Maxwell before his retirement from international cricket.

== Records and statistics ==
=== Team records ===
Highest innings totals

| Score | Opponent | Venue | Season |
|---|---|---|---|
| 157/8 (19.4 overs) | Ireland | Dharamsala | 2016 |
| 150/7 (20 overs) | Scotland | North Sound | 2024 |
| 131/0 (13.4 overs) | Papua New Guinea | Al Amarat | 2021 |
| 127/9 (20 overs) | Bangladesh | Al Amarat | 2021 |
| 125/9 (20 overs) | Australia | Bridgetown | 2024 |
Last updated: 13 June 2024

=== Most appearances ===
This list consists players with most number of matches at the T20 World Cup.

| Matches | Player | Period |
|---|---|---|
| 10 | Bilal Khan | 2016-2024 |
| 10 | Zeeshan Maqsood | 2016-2024 |
| 7 | Aqib Ilyas | 2021-2024 |
| 7 | Mehran Khan | 2016-2024 |
| 6 | Ayaan Khan | 2021-2024 |
| 6 | Kaleemullah | 2021-2024 |
| 6 | Kashyap Prajapati | 2021-2024 |
Last updated: 13 June 2024

=== Batting statistics ===
Most runs

| Runs | Player | Mat | Inn | HS | Avg | 100s | 50s | Period |
|---|---|---|---|---|---|---|---|---|
| 162 | Jatinder Singh | 5 | 5 | 73* | 40.50 | —N/a | 1 | 2016–2021 |
| 135 | Aqib Ilyas | 7 | 7 | 50* | 22.50 | —N/a | 1 | 2021–2024 |
| 111 | Zeeshan Maqsood | 10 | 8 | 38 | 13.87 | —N/a | —N/a | 2016–2024 |
| 102 | Ayaan Khan | 6 | 5 | 41* | 25.50 | —N/a | —N/a | 2021–2024 |
| 59 | Pratik Athavale | 3 | 3 | 54 | 25.50 | —N/a | 1 | 2024–2024 |
Last updated: 13 June 2024

Highest partnerships

| Runs | Players | Opposition | Venue | Season |
|---|---|---|---|---|
| 131* (1st wicket) | Jatinder Singh (73*) & Aqib Ilyas (50*) | v Papua New Guinea | Al Amarat | 2021 |
| 69 (1st wicket) | Zeeshan Maqsood (33) & Khawar Ali (34) | v Ireland | Dharamsala | 2016 |
| 47 (6th wicket) | Jatinder Singh (16) & Amir Ali (26) | v Ireland | Dharamsala | 2016 |
| 43 (5th wicket) | Ayaan Khan (22) & Pratik Athavale (19) | v Scotland | North Sound | 2024 |
| 38 (2nd wicket) | Mohammad Nadeem (9) & Aqib Ilyas (28) | v Scotland | Al Amarat | 2021 |
Last updated: 13 June 2024

=== Bowling statistics ===
Most wickets

| Wickets | Player | Matches | Avg. | Econ. | BBI | 4W | 5W | Period |
|---|---|---|---|---|---|---|---|---|
| 9 | Bilal Khan | 10 | 22.88 | 6.60 | 3/18 | 0 | 0 | 2016–2024 |
| 6 | Mehran Khan | 7 | 12.00 | 8.00 | 3/7 | 0 | 0 | 2016–2024 |
| 6 | Kaleemullah | 6 | 19.33 | 7.73 | 2/19 | 0 | 0 | 2021–2024 |
| 5 | Zeeshan Maqsood | 10 | 20.40 | 7.28 | 4/20 | 1 | 0 | 2016–2024 |
| 4 | Fayyaz Butt | 3 | 15.00 | 8.37 | 3/30 | 0 | 0 | 2021–2024 |
Last updated: 13 June 2024
