= 2022 Papua New Guinea Tri-Nation Series (April) =

Cricket tournament

- Part of 2019–2023 ICC Cricket World Cup League 2
- Date: 9–16 April 2022
- Location: United Arab Emirates
Teams
Oman	Papua New Guinea	Scotland
Captains
Zeeshan Maqsood (Note: Khawar Ali captained Oman in the third ODI of the series.)	Assad Vala	Kyle Coetzer
Most runs
Jatinder Singh (259)	Charles Amini (148)	Richie Berrington (270)
Most wickets
Bilal Khan (13)	Norman Vanua (5)	Gavin Main (9)

The 2022 Papua New Guinea Tri-Nation Series was the 11th round of the 2019–2023 ICC Cricket World Cup League 2 cricket tournament, which was played in the United Arab Emirates in April 2022. Originally scheduled to take place in Papua New Guinea, it was moved to the UAE due to travel restrictions. It was a tri-nation series between Oman, Papua New Guinea and the Scotland cricket teams, with the matches played as One Day International (ODI) fixtures. The ICC Cricket World Cup League 2 formed part of the qualification pathway for the 2023 Cricket World Cup.

Originally, the matches were due to be played in Papua New Guinea in April 2021. However, on 12 February 2021, the series was postponed due to the COVID-19 pandemic.

== Squads ==
Oman	Papua New Guinea	Scotland
Zeeshan Maqsood (c); Khawar Ali; Fayyaz Butt; Nestor Dhamba; Sandeep Goud; Kaleemullah; Ayaan Khan; Bilal Khan; Shoaib Khan; Naseem Khushi (wk); Suraj Kumar (wk); Mohammad Nadeem; Kashyap Prajapati; Jatinder Singh	Assad Vala (c); Charles Amini; Simon Atai (wk); Dogodo Bau (wk); Sese Bau; Riley Hekure; Hiri Hiri; Semo Kamea; Jason Kila; Kabua Morea; Alei Nao; Nosaina Pokana; Lega Siaka; Chad Soper; Tony Ura; Norman Vanua	Kyle Coetzer (c); Richie Berrington; Dylan Budge; Matthew Cross (wk); Alasdair Evans; Michael Leask; Gavin Main; Calum MacLeod; Christopher McBride; George Munsey; Adrian Neill; Safyaan Sharif; Hamza Tahir; Mark Watt

Finlay McCreath was also named in Scotland's squad as a travelling reserve player.

== Fixtures ==
=== 1st ODI ===
9 April 2022
15:00 (D/N)
Scorecard

Scotland; 284/3 (50 overs)	v	Papua New Guinea; 122 (35.5 overs)
Richie Berrington 114* (127); Chad Soper 1/40 (10 overs)		Sese Bau 29 (57); Gavin Main 4/26 (5.5 overs)

Scotland won by 162 runs
Dubai International Cricket Stadium, Dubai
Umpires: Akbar Ali (UAE) and Buddhi Pradhan (Nep)
Player of the match: Richie Berrington (Sco)

- Papua New Guinea won the toss and elected to field.

=== 2nd ODI ===
10 April 2022
15:00 (D/N)
Scorecard

Scotland; 215 (49.4 overs)	v	Oman; 211 (49.4 overs)
George Munsey 62 (74); Fayyaz Butt 3/48 (9 overs)		Ayaan Khan 68 (72); Adrian Neill 3/32 (9.4 overs)

Scotland won by 4 runs
Dubai International Cricket Stadium, Dubai
Umpires: Akbar Ali (UAE) and Rashid Riaz (Pak)
Player of the match: Adrian Neill (Sco)

- Scotland won the toss and elected to bat.

=== 3rd ODI ===
12 April 2022
15:00 (D/N)
Scorecard

Papua New Guinea; 224/9 (50 overs)	v	Oman; 227/3 (44.1 overs)
Charles Amini 59 (77); Bilal Khan 3/39 (10 overs)		Jatinder Singh 118* (116); Semo Kamea 2/36 (8 overs)

Oman won by 7 wickets
Dubai International Cricket Stadium, Dubai
Umpires: Buddhi Pradhan (Nep) and Rashid Riaz (Pak)
Player of the match: Jatinder Singh (Oma)

- Papua New Guinea won the toss and elected to bat.

=== 4th ODI ===
13 April 2022
15:00 (D/N)
Scorecard

Scotland; 287/5 (50 overs)	v	Papua New Guinea; 164 (36.2 overs)
Kyle Coetzer 74 (101); Chad Soper 2/60 (10 overs)		Tony Ura 47 (49); Gavin Main 5/52 (9.2 overs)

Scotland won by 123 runs
Dubai International Cricket Stadium, Dubai
Umpires: Akbar Ali (UAE) and Buddhi Pradhan (Nep)
Player of the match: Gavin Main (Sco)

- Scotland won the toss and elected to bat.
- Michael Leask (Sco) scored the fastest 50 by an Associate member player in ODIs (18 balls).
- Gavin Main (Sco) took his first five-wicket haul in ODIs.

=== 5th ODI ===
15 April 2022
14:00 (D/N)
Scorecard

Oman; 225/7 (50 overs)	v	Scotland; 226/8 (49.5 overs)
Kashyap Prajapati 81 (106); Michael Leask 3/35 (10 overs)		Richie Berrington 73 (110); Kaleemullah 3/45 (10 overs)

Scotland won by 2 wickets
Dubai International Cricket Stadium, Dubai
Umpires: Akbar Ali (UAE) and Rashid Riaz (Pak)
Player of the match: Mark Watt (Sco)

- Oman won the toss and elected to bat.
- Christopher McBride (Sco) made his ODI debut.
- Mark Watt played in his 100th international match for Scotland.

=== 6th ODI ===
16 April 2022
14:00 (D/N)
Scorecard

Oman; 277/8 (50 overs)	v	Papua New Guinea; 192 (44.3 overs)
Jatinder Singh 79 (77); Norman Vanua 3/50 (8 overs)		Charles Amini 60 (92); Bilal Khan 5/54 (10 overs)

Oman won by 85 runs
Dubai International Cricket Stadium, Dubai
Umpires: Buddhi Pradhan (Nep) and Rashid Riaz (Pak)
Player of the match: Bilal Khan (Oma)

- Oman won the toss and elected to bat.
