= 2019 Scotland Tri-Nation Series =

International cricket tournament

- Part of 2019–2023 ICC Cricket World Cup League 2
- Date: 14–21 August 2019
- Location: Scotland
Teams
Oman	Papua New Guinea	Scotland
Captains
Zeeshan Maqsood	Assad Vala	Kyle Coetzer
Most runs
Aqib Ilyas (210)	Tony Ura (134)	Kyle Coetzer (214)
Most wickets
Khawar Ali (9)	Nosaina Pokana (6); Assad Vala (6)	Hamza Tahir (10)

The 2019 Scotland Tri-Nation Series was the first round of the 2019–2023 ICC Cricket World Cup League 2 cricket tournament and took place in Scotland in August 2019. It was a tri-nation series among Oman, Papua New Guinea and the Scotland cricket teams, with the matches played as One Day International (ODI) fixtures. The ICC Cricket World Cup League 2 formed part of the qualification pathway to the 2023 Cricket World Cup. After the series, Scotland were at the top of the points table, after finishing ahead of Oman on net run rate, with both teams level on points.

The opening match of the tournament saw Oman beat Papua New Guinea by four wickets to record their first win in an ODI cricket match. Oman also won the next game of the series, beating hosts Scotland by eight wickets. Scotland won the next match by three wickets, against Papua New Guinea, with their captain Kyle Coetzer making 96 runs in the run chase. In the fourth match, Scotland beat Oman by 85 runs, with Hamza Tahir taking his first five-wicket haul for the hosts in ODI cricket. The fifth match, between Scotland and Papua New Guinea, was used to help raise funds for a local cancer charity. Scotland went on to win the match by 38 runs to record their third win of the series. In the final match, Oman beat Papua New Guinea by four wickets, leaving Papua New Guinea without a win in the series.

== Squads ==
Oman	Papua New Guinea	Scotland
Zeeshan Maqsood (c); Jatinder Singh (vc); Khawar Ali; Fayyaz Butt; Sandeep Goud; Aqib Ilyas; Aamir Kaleem; Kaleemullah; Bilal Khan; Suraj Kumar (wk); Ajay Lalcheta; Mohammad Nadeem; Khurram Nawaz; Jay Odedra	Assad Vala (c); Charles Amini (vc); Simon Atai; Sese Bau; Kiplin Doriga (wk); Riley Hekure; Hiri Hiri; Nosaina Pokana; Damien Ravu; Lega Siaka; Chad Soper; Gaudi Toka; Tony Ura; Norman Vanua	Kyle Coetzer (c); Richie Berrington; Matthew Cross (wk); Alasdair Evans; Michael Leask; Calum MacLeod; Gavin Main; George Munsey; Adrian Neill; Safyaan Sharif; Tom Sole; Hamza Tahir; Craig Wallace (wk); Mark Watt

== Fixtures ==
=== 1st ODI ===
14 August 2019
11:00
Scorecard

Papua New Guinea; 229/8 (50 overs)	v	Oman; 234/6 (49.1 overs)
Tony Ura 54 (63); Zeeshan Maqsood 3/35 (10 overs)		Sandeep Goud 67* (72); Charles Amini 2/49 (10 overs)

Oman won by 4 wickets
Mannofield Park, Aberdeen
Umpires: Alex Dowdalls (Sco) and David McLean (Sco)
Player of the match: Sandeep Goud (Oma)

- Oman won the toss and elected to field.
- Jay Odedra (Oma) and Gaudi Toka (PNG) both made their ODI debuts.

=== 2nd ODI ===
15 August 2019
11:00
Scorecard

Scotland; 168 (44.4 overs)	v	Oman; 169/2 (45.1 overs)
Kyle Coetzer 56 (72); Khawar Ali 4/23 (9 overs)		Khawar Ali 79* (140); Adrian Neill 1/24 (9.1 overs)

Oman won by 8 wickets
Mannofield Park, Aberdeen
Umpires: Roland Black (Ire) and David McLean (Sco)
Player of the match: Khawar Ali (Oma)

- Scotland won the toss and elected to bat.
- Adrian Neill (Sco) and Aamir Kaleem (Oma) both made their ODI debuts.

=== 3rd ODI ===
17 August 2019
11:00
Scorecard

Papua New Guinea; 205/9 (50 overs)	v	Scotland; 207/7 (48.5 overs)
Tony Ura 46 (47); Hamza Tahir 4/37 (10 overs)		Kyle Coetzer 96 (123); Nosaina Pokana 3/25 (7.5 overs)

Scotland won by 3 wickets
Mannofield Park, Aberdeen
Umpires: Roland Black (Ire) and Allan Haggo (Sco)
Player of the match: Kyle Coetzer (Sco)

- Scotland won the toss and elected to field.
- Gavin Main and Hamza Tahir (Sco) both made their ODI debuts.

=== 4th ODI ===
18 August 2019
11:00
Scorecard

Scotland; 223/7 (50 overs)	v	Oman; 138 (38.2 overs)
Richie Berrington 68 (87); Ajay Lalcheta 2/35 (9 overs)		Aqib Ilyas 45 (58); Hamza Tahir 5/38 (9.2 overs)

Scotland won by 85 runs
Mannofield Park, Aberdeen
Umpires: Roland Black (Ire) and Allan Haggo (Sco)
Player of the match: Hamza Tahir (Sco)

- Oman won the toss and elected to field.
- Ajay Lalcheta (Oma) made his ODI debut.
- Calum MacLeod (Sco) scored his 2,000th run in ODIs.
- Hamza Tahir (Sco) took his first five-wicket haul in ODIs.

=== 5th ODI ===
20 August 2019
11:00
Scorecard

Scotland; 242/7 (50 overs)	v	Papua New Guinea; 204/9 (50 overs)
Richie Berrington 81 (64); Assad Vala 2/39 (9 overs)		Assad Vala 48 (90); Mark Watt 2/43 (10 overs)

Scotland won by 38 runs
Mannofield Park, Aberdeen
Umpires: Roland Black (Ire) and Alex Dowdalls (Sco)
Player of the match: Richie Berrington (Sco)

- Papua New Guinea won the toss and elected to field.
- Alex Dowdalls (Sco) umpired in his 250th international match.

=== 6th ODI ===
21 August 2019
11:00
Scorecard

Papua New Guinea; 206/9 (50 overs)	v	Oman; 207/6 (47.4 overs)
Tony Ura 34 (39); Jay Odedra 4/34 (10 overs)		Aqib Ilyas 63 (76); Charles Amini 3/39 (10 overs)

Oman won by 4 wickets
Mannofield Park, Aberdeen
Umpires: Alex Dowdalls (Sco) and David McLean (Sco)
Player of the match: Aqib Ilyas (Oma)

- Oman won the toss and elected to field.
