= 2021–22 Oman Quadrangular Series =

International cricket tournament

- Dates: 11 – 14 February 2022
- Administrator: Oman Cricket
- Cricket format: Twenty20 International
- Host: Oman
- Champions: United Arab Emirates
- Participants: 4
- Matches: 6
- Most runs: (Nepal) Dipendra Singh Airee (142)
- Most wickets: (Ireland) Craig Young (6)

The 2021–22 Oman Quadrangular Series was a Twenty20 International (T20I) cricket tournament that took place in Oman in February 2022. The participating teams were the hosts Oman along with Ireland, Nepal and the United Arab Emirates. The series provided all four teams with preparation for the T20 World Cup Global Qualifier Group A, which began on 18 February 2022.

The opening match of the series, which was scheduled to be between Ireland and the UAE, was rescheduled after Ireland's luggage did not arrive on time. A man-of-the-match performance from Dipendra Singh Airee sealed victory for Nepal over Oman in a thrilling run chase in the surviving day one fixture. The UAE and Ireland each picked up comfortable wins on the second day of the competition, against Nepal and Oman, respectively. The UAE defeated Ireland in the rearranged fixture on day three, their third T20I win in a row against the Irish, to go into the final day at the top of the table. Oman ended the UAE's winning streak on the final day thanks to a five-wicket haul from Aamir Kaleem and a rapid 84 for Muhammad Waseem, to ensure that the champions would be decided in the final game of the tournament. The final match, between Ireland and Nepal, could have seen either side win the tournament, but Ireland's 16-run victory in a low-scoring affair was not enough to replace the UAE at the top of the standings.

== Squads ==
Ireland	Nepal	Oman	United Arab Emirates
Andrew Balbirnie (c); Paul Stirling (vc); Mark Adair; Curtis Campher; Gareth Delany; George Dockrell; Shane Getkate; Josh Little; Andy McBrine; Barry McCarthy; Simi Singh; Harry Tector; Lorcan Tucker (wk); Craig Young	Sandeep Lamichhane (c); Dipendra Singh Airee; Kamal Singh Airee; Pradeep Airee; Shahab Alam; Lokesh Bam; Kushal Bhurtel; Abinash Bohara; Sagar Dhakal; Karan KC; Gyanendra Malla; Kushal Malla; Jitendra Mukhiya; Aarif Sheikh; Aasif Sheikh (wk); Sharad Vesawkar; Bibek Yadav	Zeeshan Maqsood (c); Khawar Ali (vc); Fayyaz Butt; Nestor Dhamba; Sandeep Goud; Aamir Kaleem; Kaleemullah; Ayaan Khan; Bilal Khan; Shoaib Khan; Naseem Khushi (wk); Mohammad Nadeem; Khurram Nawaz; Kashyap Prajapati; Jatinder Singh	Ahmed Raza (c); Vriitya Aravind (wk); Mohammad Boota (wk); Kashif Daud; Zawar Farid; Basil Hameed; Zahoor Khan; Karthik Meiyappan; Rohan Mustafa; Akif Raja; Alishan Sharafu; Junaid Siddique; Chirag Suri; Muhammad Usman; Muhammad Waseem

Ireland also named Neil Rock and Ben White as travelling reserves. Sandeep Lamichhane captained Nepal for the first time in T20Is.

== Points table ==
Pos	Team	Pld	W	L	NR	Pts	NRR
1	United Arab Emirates	3	2	1	0	4	0.547
2	Ireland	3	2	1	0	4	0.457
3	Oman	3	1	2	0	2	−0.438
4	Nepal	3	1	2	0	2	−0.592

Source: ESPN Cricinfo

== Fixtures ==
11 February 2022
14:00
Scorecard

Oman; 135/6 (20 overs)	v	Nepal; 137/4 (19.3 overs)
Zeeshan Maqsood 43* (41); Abinash Bohara 3/26 (4 overs)		Dipendra Singh Airee 73* (53); Kaleemullah 2/24 (4 overs)

Nepal won by 6 wickets
Oman Cricket Academy Ground Turf 1, Muscat
Umpires: Akbar Ali (UAE) and Rahul Asher (Oma)
Player of the match: Dipendra Singh Airee (Nep)

- Nepal won the toss and elected to field.
- Shoaib Khan (Oma), Sagar Dhakal and Bibek Yadav (Nep) all made their T20I debuts.

12 February 2022
10:00
Scorecard

United Arab Emirates; 192/3 (20 overs)	v	Nepal; 167/5 (20 overs)
Chirag Suri 84* (53); Aarif Sheikh 1/17 (2 overs)		Dipendra Singh Airee 41 (33); Rohan Mustafa 2/26 (4 overs)

United Arab Emirates won by 25 runs
Oman Cricket Academy Ground Turf 1, Muscat
Umpires: Rahul Asher (Oma) and Vinod Babu (Oma)
Player of the match: Chirag Suri (UAE)

- Nepal won the toss and elected to field.
- Lokesh Bam (Nep) made his T20I debut.

12 February 2022
14:00
Scorecard

Oman; 137 (19.2 overs)	v	Ireland; 140/1 (17.1 overs)
Shoaib Khan 57 (38); Simi Singh 3/9 (4 overs)		Andrew Balbirnie 75* (49); Khawar Ali 1/33 (4 overs)

Ireland won by 9 wickets
Oman Cricket Academy Ground Turf 1, Muscat
Umpires: Rahul Asher (Oma) and Vinod Babu (Oma)
Player of the match: Andrew Balbirnie (Ire)

- Ireland won the toss and elected to field.

13 February 2022
10:00
Scorecard

United Arab Emirates; 178/5 (20 overs)	v	Ireland; 165/7 (20 overs)
Rohan Mustafa 54 (43); Craig Young 4/28 (4 overs)		Andrew Balbirnie 42 (27); Karthik Meiyappan 2/23 (3 overs)

United Arab Emirates won by 13 runs
Oman Cricket Academy Ground Turf 1, Muscat
Umpires: Akbar Ali (UAE) and Rahul Asher (Oma)
Player of the match: Rohan Mustafa (UAE)

- Ireland won the toss and elected to field.

14 February 2022
10:00
Scorecard

United Arab Emirates; 164/8 (20 overs)	v	Oman; 165/3 (19.3 overs)
Muhammad Waseem 84 (44); Aamir Kaleem 5/29 (4 overs)		Kashyap Prajapati 69* (53); Kashif Daud 1/13 (2 overs)

Oman won by 7 wickets
Oman Cricket Academy Ground Turf 1, Muscat
Umpires: Akbar Ali (UAE) and Vinod Babu (Oma)
Player of the match: Aamir Kaleem (Oma)

- Oman won the toss and elected to field.

14 February 2022
14:00
Scorecard

Ireland; 127 (20 overs)	v	Nepal; 111/9 (20 overs)
George Dockrell 28 (22); Dipendra Singh Airee 4/21 (4 overs)		Dipendra Singh Airee 28 (30); Andy McBrine 2/13 (4 overs)

Ireland won by 16 runs
Oman Cricket Academy Ground Turf 1, Muscat
Umpires: Akbar Ali (UAE) and Vinod Babu (Oma)
Player of the match: Dipendra Singh Airee (Nep)

- Nepal won the toss and elected to field.
- Andy McBrine played in his 100th international match for Ireland.
