= 2021 Oman Tri-Nation Series (round 7) =

Cricket tournament

- Part of 2019–2023 ICC Cricket World Cup League 2
- Date: 25 September–2 October 2021
- Location: Oman
Teams
Oman	Papua New Guinea	Scotland
Captains
Zeeshan Maqsood	Assad Vala	Kyle Coetzer
Most runs
Aqib Ilyas (123)	Assad Vala (147)	Kyle Coetzer (169)
Most wickets
Zeeshan Maqsood (7)	Kabua Morea (9)	Alasdair Evans (5)

The 2021 Oman Tri-Nation Series was the 7th round of the 2019–2023 ICC Cricket World Cup League 2 cricket tournament that took place in Oman in September and October 2021. It was a tri-nation series between Oman, Papua New Guinea and the Scotland cricket teams, with the matches played as One Day International (ODI) fixtures. The ICC Cricket World Cup League 2 formed part of the qualification pathway to the 2023 Cricket World Cup. Originally, the series was scheduled to take place in November and December 2022, but was brought forward to September 2021 by Oman Cricket. In August 2021, the International Cricket Council (ICC) announced the full schedule of the series.

Scotland won their first three matches, with Oman winning two of their fixtures, and Papua New Guinea remaining winless in the Cricket World Cup League 2 tournament. The sixth and final match of the series, between Oman and Scotland, was abandoned mid-way through Scotland's innings due to heavy rain caused by Cyclone Shaheen.

== Squads ==
Oman	Papua New Guinea	Scotland
Zeeshan Maqsood (c); Aqib Ilyas (vc); Khawar Ali; Nestor Dhamba; Sandeep Goud; Kaleemullah; Ayaan Khan; Bilal Khan; Shoaib Khan; Naseem Khushi; Suraj Kumar; Pruthvikumar Macchi; Sufyan Mehmood; Mohammad Nadeem; Kashyap Prajapati; Jatinder Singh	Assad Vala (c); Charles Amini; Simon Atai; Sese Bau; Kiplin Doriga; Jack Gardner; Hiri Hiri; Jason Kila; Nosaina Pokana; Damien Ravu; Lega Siaka; Chad Soper; Gaudi Toka; Tony Ura; Kabua Morea; Norman Vanua	Kyle Coetzer (c); Richie Berrington (vc); Dylan Budge; Matthew Cross (wk); Alasdair Evans; Michael Leask; Gavin Main; Calum MacLeod; George Munsey; Safyaan Sharif; Chris Sole; Hamza Tahir; Craig Wallace (wk); Mark Watt

== Fixtures ==
=== 1st ODI ===
25 September 2021
09:30
Scorecard

Papua New Guinea; 197 (47.4 overs)	v	Scotland; 198/4 (43 overs)
Chad Soper 46* (59); Gavin Main 3/33 (8 overs)		Matthew Cross 70 (75); Chad Soper 2/20 (10 overs)

Scotland won by 6 wickets
Oman Cricket Academy Ground Turf 2, Muscat
Umpires: Rahul Asher (Oma) and Harikrishna Pillai (Oma)
Player of the match: Matthew Cross (Sco)

- Scotland won the toss and elected to field.

=== 2nd ODI ===
26 September 2021
09:30
Scorecard

Oman; 250/7 (50 overs)	v	Papua New Guinea; 140 (42.2 overs)
Suraj Kumar 62* (70); Kabua Morea 2/50 (10 overs)		Jason Kila 36 (50); Zeeshan Maqsood 4/28 (10 overs)

Oman won by 110 runs
Oman Cricket Academy Ground Turf 2, Muscat
Umpires: Vinod Babu (Oma) and Ahmed Shah Pakteen (Afg)
Player of the match: Zeeshan Maqsood (Oma)

- Papua New Guinea won the toss and elected to field.
- Kashyap Prajapati (Oma) made his ODI debut.

=== 3rd ODI ===
28 September 2021
09:30
Scorecard

Scotland; 273/6 (50 overs)	v	Oman; 255/9 (50 overs)
Richie Berrington 97 (87); Kaleemullah 1/35 (8 overs)		Jatinder Singh 64 (65); Chris Sole 3/79 (9 overs)

Scotland won by 18 runs
Oman Cricket Academy Ground Turf 2, Muscat
Umpires: Ahmed Shah Pakteen (Afg) and Harikrishna Pillai (Oma)
Player of the match: Richie Berrington (Sco)

- Scotland won the toss and elected to bat.

=== 4th ODI ===
29 September 2021
14:30 (D/N)
Scorecard

Papua New Guinea; 226/8 (50 overs)	v	Scotland; 228/6 (48.5 overs)
Norman Vanua 57 (52); Michael Leask 3/19 (10 overs)		Kyle Coetzer 81 (103); Kabua Morea 2/40 (10 overs)

Scotland won by 4 wickets
Oman Cricket Academy Ground Turf 1, Muscat
Umpires: Rahul Asher (Oma) and Vinod Babu (Oma)
Player of the match: Michael Leask (Sco)

- Papua New Guinea won the toss and elected to bat.

=== 5th ODI ===
1 October 2021
14:30 (D/N)
Scorecard

Papua New Guinea; 150 (43.2 overs)	v	Oman; 151/7 (35.5 overs)
Assad Vala 62 (78); Khawar Ali 5/15 (8 overs)		Aqib Ilyas 56 (77); Kabua Morea 5/28 (9 overs)

Oman won by 3 wickets
Oman Cricket Academy Ground Turf 1, Muscat
Umpires: Rahul Asher (Oma) and Ahmed Shah Pakteen (Afg)
Player of the match: Khawar Ali (Oma)

- Papua New Guinea won the toss and elected to bat.
- Khawar Ali (Oma) took his first five-wicket haul in ODIs.
- Kabua Morea (PNG) took his first five-wicket haul in ODIs.

=== 6th ODI ===
2 October 2021
14:30 (D/N)
Scorecard

Scotland; 100/3 (23.2 overs)	v	Oman
George Munsey 58* (55); Bilal Khan 2/19 (5 overs)

No result
Oman Cricket Academy Ground Turf 1, Muscat
Umpires: Ahmed Shah Pakteen (Afg) and Harikrishna Pillai (Oma)

- Scotland won the toss and elected to bat.
- No further play was possible due to rain.
