= 2022 United Arab Emirates Tri-Nation Series (round 9) =

Cricket tournament

- Part of 2019–2023 ICC Cricket World Cup League 2
- Date: 5–14 March 2022
- Location: United Arab Emirates
Teams
Namibia	Oman	United Arab Emirates
Captains
Gerhard Erasmus	Zeeshan Maqsood (Note: Khawar Ali captained Oman in the second ODI of the series.)	Ahmed Raza
Most runs
Shoaib Khan (269)	Gerhard Erasmus (271)	Vriitya Aravind (207)
Most wickets
Bilal Khan (17)	Jan Frylinck (8)	Zahoor Khan (11)

The 2022 United Arab Emirates Tri-Nation Series was the 9th round of the 2019–2023 ICC Cricket World Cup League 2 cricket tournament that took place in the United Arab Emirates in March 2022. Originally scheduled to take place in December 2021, it was moved to March 2022 due to fixtures impacted by the COVID-19 pandemic being rearranged.

The tri-nation series was contested by Namibia, Oman and the United Arab Emirates, with the matches played as One Day International (ODI) fixtures. The ICC Cricket World Cup League 2 formed part of the qualification pathway to the 2023 Cricket World Cup. The series also included an additional ODI match, between Namibia and Oman. The match was originally scheduled to be played in round four in January 2020, but was cancelled following the death of Qaboos bin Said, the sultan of Oman.

== Squads ==
Namibia	Oman	United Arab Emirates
Gerhard Erasmus (c); JJ Smit (vc); Stephan Baard; Karl Birkenstock; Jan Frylinck; Zane Green (wk); Jan Nicol Loftie-Eaton (wk); Lo-handre Louwrens (wk); Tangeni Lungameni; Bernard Scholtz; Ruben Trumpelmann; Michael van Lingen; David Wiese; Craig Williams; Pikky Ya France	Zeeshan Maqsood (c); Khawar Ali (vc); Wasim Ali; Fayyaz Butt; Nestor Dhamba; Sandeep Goud; Kaleemullah; Ayaan Khan; Bilal Khan; Shoaib Khan; Naseem Khushi (wk); Suraj Kumar (wk); Mohammad Nadeem; Kashyap Prajapati; Jatinder Singh	Ahmed Raza (c); Vriitya Aravind (wk); Rahul Bhatia; Kashif Daud; Basil Hameed; Asif Khan; Zahoor Khan; Karthik Meiyappan; Rohan Mustafa; Akif Raja; Chundangapoyil Rizwan; Junaid Siddique; Chirag Suri; Muhammad Waseem

== Fixtures ==
=== 1st ODI ===
5 March 2022
09:30
Scorecard

Oman; 225/7 (50 overs)	v	United Arab Emirates; 213 (48.5 overs)
Shoaib Khan 61 (89); Zahoor Khan 3/55 (10 overs)		Vriitya Aravind 44 (65); Bilal Khan 5/31 (9.5 overs)

Oman won by 12 runs
ICC Academy Ground, Dubai
Umpires: Adrian Holdstock (SA) and Shiju Sam (UAE)
Player of the match: Bilal Khan (Oma)

- United Arab Emirates won the toss and elected to field.
- Asif Khan (UAE) made his ODI debut.
- Bilal Khan (Oma) took his first five-wicket haul in ODIs.

=== 2nd ODI ===
6 March 2022
09:30
Scorecard

Namibia; 226 (49.5 overs)	v	Oman; 116 (42.1 overs)
Gerhard Erasmus 121* (120); Bilal Khan 4/42 (10 overs)		Khawar Ali 43 (99); Tangeni Lungameni 2/14 (8 overs)

Namibia won by 110 runs
ICC Academy Ground, Dubai
Umpires: Akbar Ali (UAE) and Shiju Sam (UAE)
Player of the match: Gerhard Erasmus (Nam)

- Namibia won the toss and elected to bat.
- Tangeni Lungameni (Nam) made his ODI debut.
- David Wiese also made his ODI debut for Namibia after previously playing six ODIs for South Africa, becoming the 15th cricketer to represent two international teams in ODIs.
- Gerhard Erasmus (Nam) scored his first century in ODIs.

=== 3rd ODI ===
8 March 2022
09:30
Scorecard

Namibia; 206/8 (50 overs)	v	United Arab Emirates; 207/7 (47.1 overs)
David Wiese 67 (84); Zahoor Khan 3/44 (10 overs)		Kashif Daud 76* (86); JJ Smit 4/36 (10 overs)

United Arab Emirates won by 3 wickets
ICC Academy Ground, Dubai
Umpires: Akbar Ali (UAE) and Adrian Holdstock (SA)
Player of the match: Kashif Daud (UAE)

- United Arab Emirates won the toss and elected to field.

=== 4th ODI ===
9 March 2022
09:30
Scorecard

Oman; 221/7 (50 overs)	v	United Arab Emirates; 213 (48.3 overs)
Khawar Ali 63 (78); Zahoor Khan 4/51 (10 overs)		Chirag Suri 63 (87); Fayyaz Butt 3/28 (9.3 overs)

Oman won by 8 runs
ICC Academy Ground, Dubai
Umpires: Adrian Holdstock (SA) and Shiju Sam (UAE)
Player of the match: Khawar Ali (Oma)

- Oman won the toss and elected to bat.

=== 5th ODI ===
11 March 2022
09:30
Scorecard

Namibia; 275/8 (50 overs)	v	Oman; 276/3 (46.1 overs)
Gerhard Erasmus 76 (99); Bilal Khan 5/60 (10 overs)		Shoaib Khan 105* (75); Bernard Scholtz 2/49 (9 overs)

Oman won by 7 wickets
Sharjah Cricket Stadium, Sharjah
Umpires: Akbar Ali (UAE) and Shiju Sam (UAE)
Player of the match: Shoaib Khan (Oma)

- Namibia won the toss and elected to bat.
- Shoaib Khan (Oma) scored his first century in ODIs.

=== 6th ODI ===
12 March 2022
09:30
Scorecard

United Arab Emirates; 348/3 (50 overs)	v	Namibia; 305/9 (50 overs)
Vriitya Aravind 115* (76); Tangeni Lungameni 1/34 (4 overs)		Craig Williams 79 (84); Ahmed Raza 3/60 (10 overs)

United Arab Emirates won by 43 runs
Sharjah Cricket Stadium, Sharjah
Umpires: Akbar Ali (UAE) and Adrian Holdstock (SA)
Player of the match: Vriitya Aravind (UAE)

- Namibia won the toss and elected to field.
- Vriitya Aravind (UAE) scored his first century in ODIs.

=== 7th ODI ===
14 March 2022
09:30
Scorecard

Oman; 265/5 (50 overs)	v	Namibia; 266/5 (47.3 overs)
Shoaib Khan 86 (103); Jan Frylinck 3/36 (10 overs)		Jan Nicol Loftie-Eaton 63 (71); Bilal Khan 2/30 (9 overs)

Namibia won by 5 wickets
Dubai International Cricket Stadium, Dubai
Umpires: Adrian Holdstock (SA) and Shiju Sam (UAE)
Player of the match: Jan Nicol Loftie-Eaton (Nam)

- Oman won the toss and elected to bat.
- Lo-handre Louwrens (Nam) and Wasim Ali (Oma) both made their ODI debuts.
