= 2018–19 Oman Quadrangular Series =

Cricket tournament

- Dates: 9 – 22 February 2019
- Administrator: Oman Cricket
- Cricket format: Twenty20 International
- Host: Oman
- Champions: Scotland
- Participants: 4
- Matches: 6
- Most runs: (Netherlands) Tobias Visee (193)
- Most wickets: (Scotland) Mark Watt (7)

The 2018–19 Oman Quadrangular Series was a Twenty20 International (T20I) cricket tournament, that was held in Oman in February 2019. The series was played among Ireland, Scotland, the Netherlands and hosts Oman. The Ireland team became the first Full Member side to tour the country. All the matches were played at the Al Emarat Cricket Stadium in Muscat.

Ahead of the final day of matches, the Netherlands had won both of their fixtures, therefore with a win against Ireland in their final match, they would win the series. However, the Netherlands lost the game against Ireland by one wicket, with Stuart Poynter hitting a six off the last ball to win the match. Despite the win, Ireland finished behind the Netherlands in the table on net run rate. The Netherlands would win the series if Scotland failed to defeat Oman in the final match. However, Scotland went on to beat the hosts by seven wickets, to finish top of the points table on net run rate, winning the tournament.

As well as the T20I tournament, Ireland played two 20-over warm-up matches against the Oman Development XI side, losing both fixtures. Scotland also played three 50-over List A matches against Oman. In the first List A match, Scotland bowled Oman out for 24 runs, Oman's lowest List A total, and the fourth-lowest of all time. Scotland won the three-match series 2–1.

== Squads ==
Ireland	Netherlands	Oman	Scotland
Paul Stirling (c); Andrew Balbirnie; Peter Chase; George Dockrell; Shane Getkate; Josh Little; Andy McBrine; Kevin O'Brien; Stuart Poynter; Boyd Rankin; Simi Singh; Harry Tector; Stuart Thompson; Lorcan Tucker	Pieter Seelaar (c); Wesley Barresi; Ben Cooper; Ryan ten Doeschate; Scott Edwards; Timm van der Gugten; Fred Klaassen; Paul van Meekeren; Stephan Myburgh; Max O'Dowd; Shane Snater; Roelof van der Merwe; Tobias Visee; Sikander Zulfiqar	Ajay Lalcheta (c); Khawar Ali (vc); Wasim Ali; Fayyaz Butt; Aamir Kaleem; Kaleemullah; Bilal Khan; Mehran Khan; Naseem Khushi (wk); Sufyan Mehmood; Mohammad Nadeem; Khurram Nawaz; Jay Odedra; Jatinder Singh	Kyle Coetzer (c); Richie Berrington; Matthew Cross; Alasdair Evans; Chris Greaves; Michael Leask; Calum MacLeod; George Munsey; Adrian Neill; Safyaan Sharif; Ruaidhri Smith; Hamza Tahir; Craig Wallace; Mark Watt

== Warm-up matches ==
=== 1st T20 match: Oman Development XI vs Ireland ===
9 February 2019
09:15
Scorecard

Ireland; 112/8 (20 overs)	v	Oman Development XI; 116/6 (15.2 overs)
George Dockrell 26* (22); Badal Singh 2/16 (4 overs)		Suraj Kumar 56* (41); Josh Little 2/14 (3 overs)

Oman Development XI won by 4 wickets
Oman Cricket Academy Ground Turf 1, Muscat
Umpires: Vinod Babu (Oma) and Afzalkhan Pathan (Oma)

- Oman Development XI won the toss and elected to field.

=== 2nd T20 match: Oman Development XI vs Ireland ===
10 February 2019
09:15
Scorecard

Ireland; 170/6 (20 overs)	v	Oman Development XI; 171/8 (19.4 overs)
Paul Stirling 78 (48); Sufyan Mehmood 3/30 (4 overs)		Sandeep Goud 55* (29); Shane Getkate 2/30 (4 overs)

Oman Development XI won by 2 wickets
Oman Cricket Academy Ground Turf 1, Muscat
Umpires: Samir Parker (Oma) and Mujahid Surve (Oma)

- Oman Development XI won the toss and elected to field.

== Points table ==
Pos	Team	Pld	W	L	T	NR	Pts	NRR
1	Scotland	3	2	1	0	0	4	0.877
2	Netherlands	3	2	1	0	0	4	0.207
3	Ireland	3	2	1	0	0	4	0.033
4	Oman (H)	3	0	3	0	0	0	−1.100

(H) Host

== Fixtures ==
=== 1st T20I ===
13 February 2019
09:15
Scorecard

Scotland; 153/7 (20 overs)	v	Netherlands; 154/3 (19.5 overs)
Calum MacLeod 53 (45); Timm van der Gugten 2/35 (4 overs)		Tobias Visee 71 (43); Safyaan Sharif 1/28 (4 overs)

Netherlands won by 7 wickets
Oman Cricket Academy Ground Turf 1, Muscat
Umpires: Rahul Asher (Oma) and Ahsan Raza (Pak)
Player of the match: Tobias Visee (Ned)

- Netherlands won the toss and elected to field.
- Ruaidhri Smith (Sco) made his T20I debut.

=== 2nd T20I ===
13 February 2019
13:45
Scorecard

Ireland; 159/5 (20 overs)	v	Oman; 144/9 (20 overs)
Paul Stirling 71 (51); Fayyaz Butt 2/19 (4 overs)		Fayyaz Butt 25* (18); Simi Singh 3/15 (3 overs)

Ireland won by 15 runs
Oman Cricket Academy Ground Turf 1, Muscat
Umpires: Rahul Asher (Oma) and Ahsan Raza (Pak)
Player of the match: Paul Stirling (Ire)

- Oman won the toss and elected to field.
- Fayyaz Butt, Jay Odedra (Oma) and Shane Getkate (Ire) all made their T20I debuts.
- Shane Getkate became Ireland's 700th international cap.
- Paul Stirling captained Ireland for the first time in T20Is.
- Ajay Lalcheta captained Oman for the first time in T20Is.

=== 3rd T20I ===
15 February 2019
09:15
Scorecard

Oman; 166/4 (20 overs)	v	Netherlands; 167/2 (18.5 overs)
Jatinder Singh 63 (51); Roelof van der Merwe 2/14 (4 overs)		Ben Cooper 50* (34); Sandeep Goud 2/36 (4 overs)

Netherlands won by 8 wickets
Oman Cricket Academy Ground Turf 1, Muscat
Umpires: Rahul Asher (Oma) and Ahsan Raza (Pak)
Player of the match: Roelof van der Merwe (Ned)

- Netherlands won the toss and elected to field.
- Sandeep Goud (Oma) made his T20I debut.

=== 4th T20I ===
15 February 2019
13:45
Scorecard

Ireland; 180/7 (20 overs)	v	Scotland; 181/4 (18.3 overs)
Kevin O'Brien 65 (38); Mark Watt 3/26 (4 overs)		Kyle Coetzer 74 (38); Shane Getkate 2/15 (2 overs)

Scotland won by 6 wickets
Oman Cricket Academy Ground Turf 1, Muscat
Umpires: Rahul Asher (Oma) and Ahsan Raza (Pak)
Player of the match: Kyle Coetzer (Sco)

- Scotland won the toss and elected to field.
- Paul Stirling and Kevin O'Brien's opening partnership of 115 runs was the highest for any wicket for Ireland in T20Is.

=== 5th T20I ===
17 February 2019
09:15
Scorecard

Netherlands; 182/9 (20 overs)	v	Ireland; 183/9 (20 overs)
Tobias Visee 78 (36); Stuart Thompson 4/18 (3 overs)		Andrew Balbirnie 83 (50); Paul van Meekeren 4/38 (4 overs)

Ireland won by 1 wicket
Oman Cricket Academy Ground Turf 1, Muscat
Umpires: Rahul Asher (Oma) and Ahsan Raza (Pak)
Player of the match: Andrew Balbirnie (Ire)

- Ireland won the toss and elected to field.

=== 6th T20I ===
17 February 2019
13:45
Scorecard

Oman; 111 (19.3 overs)	v	Scotland; 115/3 (15.2 overs)
Sandeep Goud 31* (19); Mark Watt 3/20 (4 overs)		Richie Berrington 47* (29); Mohammad Nadeem 2/25 (4 overs)

Scotland won by 7 wickets
Oman Cricket Academy Ground Turf 1, Muscat
Umpires: Rahul Asher (Oma) and Ahsan Raza (Pak)
Player of the match: Adrian Neill (Sco)

- Scotland won the toss and elected to field.
- Wasim Ali (Oma) and Adrian Neill (Sco) both made their T20I debuts.

== List A matches ==
Scottish cricket team in Oman in 2018–19
	Oman	Scotland
- Dates: 19 February – 22 February 2019
Captains	Ajay Lalcheta (Note: Khawar Ali captained Oman for the second and third List A matches.)	Kyle Coetzer

LA series
- Result: Scotland won the 3-match series 2–1
Most runs	Khurram Nawaz (95)	George Munsey (130)
Most wickets	Mohammad Nadeem (5)	Safyaan Sharif (6)

=== 1st List A match: Oman vs Scotland ===
19 February 2019
09:30
Scorecard

Oman; 24 (17.1 overs)	v	Scotland; 26/0 (3.2 overs)
Khawar Ali 15 (33); Adrian Neill 4/7 (4.1 overs)		Kyle Coetzer 16* (9)

Scotland won by 10 wickets
Oman Cricket Academy Ground Turf 1, Muscat
Umpires: Rahul Asher (Oma) and Ahsan Raza (Pak)

- Scotland won the toss and elected to field.
- Twinkal Bhandari, Moonamchery Michal, Khurram Nawaz, Sandeep Goud (Oma) and Adrian Neill (Sco) all made their List A debuts.

=== 2nd List A match: Oman vs Scotland ===
20 February 2019
09:30
Scorecard

Oman; 248/8 (50 overs)	v	Scotland; 155 (40 overs)
Khurram Nawaz 64 (45); Safyaan Sharif 3/60 (10 overs)		Richie Berrington 37 (56); Badal Singh 3/25 (10 overs)

Oman won by 93 runs
Oman Cricket Academy Ground Turf 1, Muscat
Umpires: Rahul Asher (Oma) and Ahsan Raza (Pak)

- Scotland won the toss and elected to field.
- Hamza Tahir (Sco) made his List A debut.

=== 3rd List A match: Oman vs Scotland ===
22 February 2019
09:30
Scorecard

Scotland; 303/5 (50 overs)	v	Oman; 288/8 (50 overs)
George Munsey 96 (43); Mohammad Nadeem 2/16 (4 overs)		Sandeep Goud 49 (63); Safyaan Sharif 3/65 (10 overs)

Scotland won by 15 runs
Oman Cricket Academy Ground Turf 1, Muscat
Umpires: Rahul Asher (Oma) and Ahsan Raza (Pak)

- Oman won the toss and elected to field.
