= 2020 Nepal Tri-Nation Series =

Cricket tournament

- Part of 2019–2023 ICC Cricket World Cup League 2
- Date: 5–12 February 2020
- Location: Nepal
Teams
Nepal	Oman	United States
Captains
Gyanendra Malla	Zeeshan Maqsood	Saurabh Netravalkar
Most runs
Binod Bhandari (120)	Aqib Ilyas (302)	Ian Holland (168)
Most wickets
Sushan Bhari (11)	Aqib Ilyas (10)	Saurabh Netravalkar (6); Rusty Theron (6)

The 2020 Nepal Tri-Nation Series was the fifth round of the 2019–2023 ICC Cricket World Cup League 2 cricket tournament and took place in Nepal in February 2020. It was a tri-nation series between Nepal, Oman and the United States cricket teams, with the matches played as One Day International (ODI) fixtures. The ICC Cricket World Cup League 2 formed part of the qualification pathway to the 2023 Cricket World Cup. The matches were the first ODIs to be played in Nepal. On 20 January 2020, the United States confirmed their squad for the series, with Steven Taylor stripped of his vice-captaincy role for disciplinary issues, but being retained in the squad.

Oman won their first three matches. In the last fixture of the series, the United States were bowled out for 35 runs, the joint-lowest total in an ODI match.

== Squads ==
Nepal	Oman	United States
Gyanendra Malla (c); Dipendra Singh Airee (vc); Kamal Singh Airee; Binod Bhandari; Sushan Bhari; Abinash Bohara; Karan KC; Paras Khadka; Subash Khakurel; Sandeep Lamichhane; Kushal Malla; Rohit Paudel; Lalit Rajbanshi; Aarif Sheikh; Sharad Vesawkar	Zeeshan Maqsood (c); Aqib Ilyas (vc); Khawar Ali; Fayyaz Butt; Sandeep Goud; Kaleemullah; Bilal Khan; Naseem Khushi; Suraj Kumar; Mohammad Nadeem; Jay Odedra; Mohammad Sanuth; Badal Singh; Jatinder Singh	Saurabh Netravalkar (c); Karima Gore; Ian Holland; Akshay Homraj; Elmore Hutchinson; Aaron Jones; Nosthush Kenjige; Xavier Marshall; Monank Patel; Nisarg Patel; Timil Patel; Cameron Stevenson; Steven Taylor; Rusty Theron

In the first match, Nepal's Sharad Vesawkar suffered an injury and was ruled out of the rest of the series, with Subash Khakurel replacing him.

== Fixtures ==
=== 1st ODI ===
5 February 2020
09:30
Scorecard

Oman; 197/9 (50 overs)	v	Nepal; 179 (46.5 overs)
Mohammad Nadeem 69* (96); Karan KC 4/47 (9 overs)		Sharad Vesawkar 55 (108); Zeeshan Maqsood 3/30 (10 overs)

Oman won by 18 runs
Tribhuvan University International Cricket Ground, Kirtipur
Umpires: Buddhi Pradhan (Nep) and Chettithody Shamshuddin (Ind)
Player of the match: Mohammad Nadeem (Oma)

- Nepal won the toss and elected to field.
- Sushan Bhari, Abinash Bohara (Nep) and Badal Singh (Oma) all made their ODI debuts.
- This was the first ODI match to be played at this ground.

=== 2nd ODI ===
6 February 2020
09:30
Scorecard

United States; 213 (50 overs)	v	Oman; 214/4 (49.3 overs)
Ian Holland 65 (78); Mohammad Nadeem 3/43 (8 overs)		Aqib Ilyas 72 (110); Steven Taylor 1/34 (6 overs)

Oman won by 6 wickets
Tribhuvan University International Cricket Ground, Kirtipur
Umpires: Buddhi Pradhan (Nep) and Durga Subedi (Nep)
Player of the match: Mohammad Nadeem (Oma)

- Oman won the toss and elected to field.

=== 3rd ODI ===
8 February 2020
09:30
Scorecard

Nepal; 190 (49.2 overs)	v	United States; 155 (44.1 overs)
Binod Bhandari 59 (79); Cameron Stevenson 3/30 (10 overs)		Ian Holland 75 (111); Karan KC 4/15 (7.1 overs)

Nepal won by 35 runs
Tribhuvan University International Cricket Ground, Kirtipur
Umpires: Buddhi Pradhan (Nep) and Chettithody Shamshuddin (Ind)
Player of the match: Karan KC (Nep)

- United States won the toss and elected to field.
- Kushal Malla (Nep) made his ODI debut, and at the age of 15 years and 340 days, became the youngest male cricketer to score an international half-century.

=== 4th ODI ===
9 February 2020
09:30
Scorecard

Nepal; 249/8 (50 overs)	v	Oman; 250/2 (47.2 overs)
Gyanendra Malla 56 (76); Aqib Ilyas 4/36 (10 overs)		Aqib Ilyas 109* (108); Kushal Malla 1/29 (9 overs)

Oman won by 8 wickets
Tribhuvan University International Cricket Ground, Kirtipur
Umpires: Chettithody Shamshuddin (Ind) and Durga Subedi (Nep)
Player of the match: Aqib Ilyas (Oma)

- Oman won the toss and elected to field.
- Kamal Singh Airee (Nep) made his ODI debut.
- Aqib Ilyas scored the first century for Oman in ODIs.

=== 5th ODI ===
11 February 2020
09:30
Scorecard

Oman; 276/6 (50 overs)	v	United States; 184 (39.1 overs)
Zeeshan Maqsood 109 (109); Saurabh Netravalkar 3/37 (10 overs)		Nisarg Patel 52 (36); Aqib Ilyas 3/14 (5 overs)

Oman won by 92 runs
Tribhuvan University International Cricket Ground, Kirtipur
Umpires: Buddhi Pradhan (Nep) and Durga Subedi (Nep)
Player of the match: Aqib Ilyas (Oma)

- United States won the toss and elected to field.
- Zeeshan Maqsood (Oma) scored his first century in ODIs.

=== 6th ODI ===
12 February 2020
09:30
Scorecard

United States; 35 (12 overs)	v	Nepal; 36/2 (5.2 overs)
Xavier Marshall 16 (22); Sandeep Lamichhane 6/16 (6 overs)		Paras Khadka 20* (12); Nosthush Kenjige 2/15 (2.2 overs)

Nepal won by 8 wickets
Tribhuvan University International Cricket Ground, Kirtipur
Umpires: Chettithody Shamshuddin (Ind) and Durga Subedi (Nep)
Player of the match: Sandeep Lamichhane (Nep)

- Nepal won the toss and elected to field.
- Sandeep Lamichhane (Nep) took his first five-wicket haul in ODIs.
- United States' score of 35 was the joint-lowest total in ODIs.
- This was also the shortest innings by a team in ODIs, in terms of the number of balls played in an innings (72). It was also the shortest match in ODIs, in terms of the number of balls faced (104).
