= 2020 Oman Tri-Nation Series =

Cricket tournament

- Part of 2019–2023 ICC Cricket World Cup League 2
- Date: 5–12 January 2020
- Location: Oman
Teams
Namibia	Oman	United Arab Emirates
Captains
Gerhard Erasmus	Zeeshan Maqsood	Ahmed Raza
Most runs
Craig Williams (158)	Aqib Ilyas (98)	Muhammad Usman (105)
Most wickets
JJ Smit (8)	Bilal Khan (7)	Ahmed Raza (7)

The 2020 Oman Tri-Nation Series was the fourth round of the 2019–2023 ICC Cricket World Cup League 2 cricket tournament and took place in Oman in January 2020. It was a tri-nation series between Oman, Namibia and the United Arab Emirates cricket teams, with the matches played as One Day International (ODI) fixtures. The ICC Cricket World Cup League 2 formed part of the qualification pathway to the 2023 Cricket World Cup.

After the first three ODIs, each team had won one match. The UAE then beat Namibia by eight wickets in the fourth match of the series.

Oman's match against the UAE on 11 January 2020 was cancelled following the death of Qaboos bin Said, the Sultan of Oman, who had died the previous day. The International Cricket Council (ICC) also confirmed that the final match of the series, between Oman and Namibia, would also not go ahead, with points not awarded for the two abandoned matches. The ICC looked at the possibility of playing the two matches at a later date, with the fixtures included in the 8th round of the tournament in November and December 2021.

== Squads ==
Namibia	Oman	United Arab Emirates
Gerhard Erasmus (c); Jan Frylinck (vc); Stephan Baard; Karl Birkenstock; Jan-Izak de Villiers; Zane Green (wk); Jean-Pierre Kotze; Jan Nicol Loftie-Eaton; Mauritius Ngupita; Ben Shikongo; Bernard Scholtz; JJ Smit; Craig Williams; Pikky Ya France	Zeeshan Maqsood (c); Khawar Ali; Fayyaz Butt; Sandeep Goud; Aqib Ilyas; Kaleemullah; Bilal Khan; Naseem Khushi; Suraj Kumar; Mohammad Nadeem; Jay Odedra; Mohammad Sanuth; Badal Singh; Jatinder Singh	Ahmed Raza (c); Waheed Ahmed; Vriitya Aravind (wk); Mohammad Ayaz; Darius D'Silva; Zawar Farid; Jonathan Figy; Basil Hameed; ~~Zahoor Khan~~; Karthik Meiyappan; Rohan Mustafa; Chundangapoyil Rizwan; Junaid Siddique; Chirag Suri; Muhammad Usman

Zahoor Khan withdrew from the UAE's squad following the death of his mother. Mohammad Ayaz was named as his replacement.

== Fixtures ==
=== 1st ODI ===
5 January 2020
10:00
Scorecard

United Arab Emirates; 170 (47.1 overs)	v	Oman; 171/5 (37.3 overs)
Muhammad Usman 68 (95); Zeeshan Maqsood 4/15 (6.1 overs)		Aqib Ilyas 80* (92); Junaid Siddique 2/32 (7 overs)

Oman won by 5 wickets
Al Amerat Cricket Stadium, Muscat
Umpires: Rahul Asher (Oma) and Lyndon Hannibal (SL)
Player of the match: Aqib Ilyas (Oma)

- Oman won the toss and elected to field.
- Naseem Khushi, Mohammad Sanuth (Oma) and Zawar Farid (UAE) all made their ODI debuts.

=== 2nd ODI ===
6 January 2020
10:00
Scorecard

United Arab Emirates; 222/9 (50 overs)	v	Namibia; 214/8 (50 overs)
Rohan Mustafa 59* (65); Bernard Scholtz 2/34 (10 overs)		Gerhard Erasmus 56 (74); Karthik Meiyappan 4/37 (9 overs)

United Arab Emirates won by 8 runs
Al Amerat Cricket Stadium, Muscat
Umpires: Rahul Asher (Oma) and Vinod Babu (Oma)
Player of the match: Rohan Mustafa (UAE)

- Namibia won the toss and elected to field,
- Ben Shikongo (Nam) made his ODI debut.

=== 3rd ODI ===
8 January 2020
10:00
Scorecard

Namibia; 324/7 (50 overs)	v	Oman; 272 (45 overs)
Craig Williams 129* (94); Bilal Khan 4/49 (10 overs)		Suraj Kumar 58 (59); JJ Smit 5/44 (8 overs)

Namibia won by 52 runs
Al Amerat Cricket Stadium, Muscat
Umpires: Lyndon Hannibal (SL) and Harikrishna Pillai (Oma)
Player of the match: Craig Williams (Nam)

- Namibia won the toss and elected to bat.
- Jan-Izak de Villiers (Nam) made his ODI debut.
- Craig Williams (Nam) scored his first century in ODIs.

=== 4th ODI ===
9 January 2020
10:00
Scorecard

Namibia; 94 (29 overs)	v	United Arab Emirates; 95/2 (19.3 overs)
JJ Smit 26 (45); Ahmed Raza 5/26 (8 overs)		Jonathan Figy 32* (37); Bernard Scholtz 1/11 (5 overs)

United Arab Emirates won by 8 wickets
Al Amerat Cricket Stadium, Muscat
Umpires: Rahul Asher (Oma) and Harikrishna Pillai (Oma)
Player of the match: Ahmed Raza (UAE)

- Namibia won the toss and elected to bat.
- Ahmed Raza (UAE) took his first five-wicket haul in ODIs.
- In terms of wickets, this was the United Arab Emirates' biggest win in ODIs.

=== 5th ODI ===
11 January 2020
10:00
Scorecard

Oman	v	United Arab Emirates

Match cancelled
Al Amerat Cricket Stadium, Muscat
Umpires: Vinod Babu (Oma) and Lyndon Hannibal (SL)

- The match was cancelled following the death of Qaboos bin Said.

=== 6th ODI ===
12 January 2020
10:00
Scorecard

Oman	v	Namibia

Match cancelled
Al Amerat Cricket Stadium, Muscat
Umpires: Rahul Asher (Oma) and Lyndon Hannibal (SL)

- The match was cancelled following the death of Qaboos bin Said.
