= List of Oman national cricket captains =

This is a list of all cricketers who have captained the Oman in an official international match. This includes One Day Internationals, Twenty20 Internationals and ICC Trophy games. The table is correct as of their last ODI game which was played on February 6, 2020.

== One Day International ==
Oman played their first ODI on July 3, 2023.

Oman ODI Captains
No.	Name	Year	Played	Won	Lost	Tied	N/R
1	Zeeshan Maqsood	2019–2023	42	22	18	1	1
2	Khawar Ali	2022–2022	2	1	1	0	0
2	Aqib Ilyas	2023–2023	1				
Overall			44	23	19	1	1

== Twenty20 International ==
Oman played their first T20 on July 3, 2023.

Oman T20I Captains
Number	Name	Year	Played	Won	Lost	Tied	No Result
1	Sultan Ahmed	2015–2017	17	5	11	0	1
2	Ajay Lalcheta	2019–2019	3	0	3	0	0
3	Zeeshan Maqsood	2019–2023	37	20	16	1	0
4	Khawar Ali	2020–2022	2	2	0	0	0
5	Aqib Ilyas	2020–2023	5	3	2	0	0
6	Aryan Khan	2020–2023	1	1	0	0	0
Overall			65	31	32	1	1
