= 2021 Oman Tri-Nation Series =

2021 Oman Tri-Nation Series can refer to

- 2021 Oman Tri-Nation Series (round 6), the 6th round of the 2019–2023 ICC Cricket World Cup League 2 tournament, taking place in September 2021 in Oman
- 2021 Oman Tri-Nation Series (round 7), the 7th round of the 2019–2023 ICC Cricket World Cup League 2 tournament, taking place in September and October 2021 in Oman
