= Mohammad Ayaz =

Emirati cricketer

Personal information
- Born: 13 October 1987 (age 39); Jhelum, Punjab, Pakistan
- Batting: Left-handed
- Bowling: Left-arm fast-medium
- Role: Bowler

International information
- National side: United Arab Emirates
- Only T20I (cap 53): 25 February 2020 v Saudi Arabia

Career statistics
| Competition | T20I | FC | LA |
|---|---|---|---|
| Matches | 1 | 13 | 2 |
| Runs scored | 0 | 52 | 1 |
| Batting average | 0.00 | 5.77 | - |
| 100s/50s | 0/0 | 0/0 | 0/0 |
| Top score | 0 | 11* | 1 |
| Balls bowled | 12 | 1761 | 102 |
| Wickets | 0 | 35 | 4 |
| Bowling average | – | 26.71 | 25.98 |
| 5 wickets in innings | – | 1 | 0 |
| 10 wickets in match | – | 0 | 0 |
| Best bowling | – | 5/64 | 4/34 |
| Catches/stumpings | 0/– | 4/– | 1/– |
- Source: Cricinfo, 24 May 2020

Mohammad Ayaz (born 13 October 1987) is a Pakistani-born cricketer who plays for the United Arab Emirates national cricket team. Ayaz is a left-handed batsman and left arm fast bowler.

== Career ==
He made his first-class debut for Rawalpindi on 21 October 2007 in the 2007–08 Quaid-e-Azam Trophy in Pakistan. By December 2011, he played in another thirteen first-class matches and two List A matches in Pakistan.

Since 2015, he has represented the United Arab Emirates. He played in a twenty-over match against an England XI side in November 2015, during England's tour of the UAE. In January 2020, he was added to the UAE's One Day International (ODI) squad for the 2020 Oman Tri-Nation Series. In February 2020, he was named in the UAE's Twenty20 International (T20I) squad for the 2020 ACC Western Region T20 qualifier tournament. He made his T20I debut for the UAE, against Saudi Arabia, on 25 February 2020.
