= Adeel Shafique =

Omani cricketer (born 1994)

Personal information
- Full name: Adeel Ahmad Shafique
- Born: 7 June 1994 (age 32); Nottingham, England
- Batting: Right-handed
- Role: Wicket-keeper

International information
- National side: Oman (2023-present)
- ODI debut (cap 25): 21 April 2023 v Nepal
- Last ODI: 29 April 2023 v UAE
- Source: Cricinfo, 28 May 2023

Adeel Ahmad Shafique (born 7 June 1994) is an English cricketer who now plays for the Oman national cricket team. On 9 April 2023, he was named in Oman's squad for the 2023 ACC Men's Premier Cup in Nepal. He made his One Day International (ODI) debut on 21 April 2023 against Nepal in the 7th match of the tournament.

On 24 May 2023 he was named in Oman's squad for the 2023 Cricket World Cup Qualifier in Zimbabwe.
