= Jiten Ramanandi =

Indian–born cricketer (born 1994)

Personal information
- Born: 15 September 1994 (age 32); Navsari, Gujarat, India
- Batting: Left-handed
- Bowling: Left-arm medium
- Role: Bowler

International information
- National side: Oman (2025-present)
- ODI debut (cap 39): 18 February 2025 v United States
- ODI shirt no.: 6
- T20I debut (cap 46): 21 February 2025 v United States
- Last T20I: 17 October 2025 v Japan
- T20I shirt no.: 6

Career statistics
Competition	ODI	T20I
Matches	1	11
Runs scored	2	81
Batting average	2.00	13.50
100s/50s	0/0	0/0
Top score	2	19
Balls bowled	0	198
Wickets	0	15
Bowling average	–	15.26
5 wickets in innings	0	0
10 wickets in match	0	0
Best bowling	–	3/22
Catches/stumpings	0/–	1/–
- Source: ESPNcricinfo, 31 December 2025

Jiten Ramanandi (born 15 September 1994) is an Indian-born cricketer who plays for the Oman national cricket team. He is a left-handed batsman and left-arm medium bowler. He made his debut for the Omani national side in February 2025.

== Early life ==
Ramanandi was born on 15 September 1994 in Gujarat, India. Coming from a small village in Navsari, he took up cricket in his childhood and also moved on to represent Baroda at Under-19 level.

During his cricketing days in India, he played alongside the likes of Hardik Pandya in inter-club tournaments in Gujarat.

== International career ==
Ramanandi moved to Oman in 2019 due to financial issues faced back home and started playing the game for a local private company.

He made his One Day International (ODI) debut for Oman in February 2025 against the United States at home during the ninth round of the 2024–2026 Cricket World Cup League 2. However, he did not get an opportunity to bowl in the match.

He made his Twenty20 International (T20I) debut in the subsequent T20I series against the United States on 21 February 2025. He scored 17 runs from the two matches that he played and was unable to take any wickets.

In September 2025, he was named in Oman's squad for the 2025 Asia Cup. In the two matches that he played in the tournament, he scalped 4 wickets and scored 25 runs.

In December 2025, Ramanandi was named in Oman's squad for the 2026 Men's T20 World Cup, which will mark his maiden appearance at an ICC event.
