= Pruthvikumar Machhi =

Omani cricketer (born 1995)

Personal information
- Full name: Pruthvikumar Damubhai Machhi
- Born: 21 January 1995 (age 31); Umargam, Gujarat, India
- Batting: Left-handed
- Bowling: Slow left-arm orthodox

International information
- National side: Oman
- ODI debut (cap 22): 20 September 2021 v United States
- Last ODI: 19 May 2025 v Canada
- Source: Cricinfo, 20 September 2021

Pruthvikumar Machhi (born 21 January 1995) is an Indian-born cricketer who plays for the Oman cricket team. In September 2021, he was named in Oman's One Day International (ODI) squad for round six and seven of the 2019–2023 ICC Cricket World Cup League 2. He made his ODI debut on 20 September 2021, for Oman against the United States.
