= Adrian Neill =

Scottish cricketer

Personal information
- Born: 22 March 1994 (age 32); Riversdale, South Africa
- Height: 6 ft 9 in (2.06 m)
- Batting: Right-handed
- Bowling: Right-arm medium
- Role: Bowler

International information
- National side: Scotland
- ODI debut (cap 68): 15 August 2019 v Oman
- Last ODI: 25 June 2023 v Oman
- T20I debut (cap 49): 17 February 2019 v Oman
- Last T20I: 31 October 2019 v Oman

Career statistics
Competition	ODI	T20I	LA	T20
Matches	9	5	11	5
Runs scored	29	–	29	–
Batting average	14.50	–	21.21	–
100s/50s	0/0	–/–	0/0	–/–
Top score	14*	–	14*	–
Balls bowled	431	120	504	120
Wickets	14	9	19	9
Bowling average	24.42	17.11	21.21	17.11
5 wickets in innings	0	0	0	0
10 wickets in match	0	0	0	0
Best bowling	3/32	3/21	4/7	3/21
Catches/stumpings	3/–	4/–	3/–	4/–
- Source: Cricinfo, 19 February 2024

Adrian Neill (born 22 March 1994) is a Scottish cricketer. In January 2019, he was named in Scotland's Twenty20 International (T20I) squad for the 2018–19 Oman Quadrangular Series in Oman. He made his T20I debut for Scotland against Oman on 17 February 2019. He took three wickets and was named the player of the match. He made his List A debut for Scotland against Oman on 19 February 2019, following the 2018–19 Oman Quadrangular Series.

Before his international debut, he had played for Gloucestershire's Second XI side. In June 2019, he was selected to represent Scotland A in their tour to Ireland to play the Ireland Wolves. The following month, he was selected to play for the Edinburgh Rocks in the inaugural edition of the Euro T20 Slam cricket tournament. However, the following month the tournament was cancelled.

In July 2019, he was named in Scotland's One Day International (ODI) squad for the 2019 Scotland Tri-Nation Series. He made his ODI debut for Scotland, against Oman, on 15 August 2019.

In September 2019, he was named in Scotland's squad for the 2019 ICC T20 World Cup Qualifier tournament in the United Arab Emirates.
