= Rahul Asher =

Omani cricket umpire

Personal information
- Born: 18 February 1979 (age 47); Calicut, Kerala, India

Umpiring information
- ODIs umpired: 20 (2020–2025)
- T20Is umpired: 64 (2019–2025)
- WT20Is umpired: 7 (2021–2022)
- Source: Cricinfo, 16 November 2022

Rahul Asher (born 18 February 1979) is an Indian-born cricket umpire based in Oman. In July 2017, Asher was selected to officiate in matches in the Under-19 Cricket World Cup qualification tournament in Singapore. He was one of the umpires in the 2018 ICC World Cricket League Division Three tournament in Oman. In April 2018, he was appointed to the Development Panel of ICC Umpires.

In January 2019, Asher umpired in his first Twenty20 International (T20I) match, featuring Qatar and Saudi Arabia, in the 2019 ACC Western Region T20 tournament. He was one of two umpires to join ICC officials for the 2018–19 Oman Quadrangular Series. In January 2020, he officiated in his first One Day International (ODI) match, in the opening fixture of the 2020 Oman Tri-Nation Series, between Oman and the United Arab Emirates.

Asher was one of the on-field umpires for the 2022 ICC Under-19 Cricket World Cup in the West Indies, where he stood in many matches including the quarterfinals between India-U19 and Bangladesh-U19.

== See also ==
- List of One Day International cricket umpires
- List of Twenty20 International cricket umpires
