= Badal Singh =

Omani cricketer (born 1987)

Personal information
- Full name: Badal Kumar Singh
- Born: 29 October 1987 (age 39); Cuncolim, Goa, India

International information
- National side: Oman
- ODI debut (cap 17): 5 February 2020 v Nepal
- Last ODI: 11 February 2020 v USA
- Source: ESPNcricinfo, 11 February 2020

Badal Singh (born 29 October 1987) is an Indian-born cricketer who plays for the Oman national cricket team. Singh made his List A debut for Goa on 10 February 2007 in the Ranji One-Day Trophy against Hyderabad.

== International career ==
In October 2018, he was named in Oman's squad for the 2018 ICC World Cricket League Division Three tournament in Oman. He played in Oman's final fixture of the tournament, against Uganda, on 18 November 2018. In March 2019, he was named in Oman's team for the 2019 ICC World Cricket League Division Two tournament in Namibia. In November 2019, he was named in Oman's squad for the 2019 ACC Emerging Teams Asia Cup in Bangladesh. The following month, he was named in Oman's One Day International (ODI) squad for the 2020 Oman Tri-Nation Series. He made his ODI debut against Nepal, on 5 February 2020 and he played in the ODI against USA on 11 February 2020.
