= Aamir Kaleem =

Omani cricketer

Personal information
- Full name: Syed Aamir Kaleem
- Born: 20 November 1981 (age 44); Karachi, Sindh, Pakistan
- Batting: Left-handed
- Bowling: Slow left-arm orthodox
- Role: All-rounder

International information
- National side: Oman (2010–present)
- ODI debut (cap 13): 15 August 2019 v Scotland
- Last ODI: 27 May 2025 v United States
- T20I debut (cap 1): 25 July 2015 v Afghanistan
- Last T20I: 20 February 2026 v Australia
- T20I shirt no.: 7

Career statistics
| Competition | ODI | T20I | T20 |
|---|---|---|---|
| Matches | 15 | 58 | 75 |
| Runs scored | 160 | 779 | 996 |
| Batting average | 12.30 | 17.70 | 17.78 |
| 100s/50s | 0/0 | 0/3 | 0/4 |
| Top score | 32 | 72* | 72* |
| Balls bowled | 680 | 755 | 1,007 |
| Wickets | 18 | 49 | 58 |
| Bowling average | 22.77 | 19.40 | 21.41 |
| 5 wickets in innings | 0 | 2 | 2 |
| 10 wickets in match | 0 | 0 | 0 |
| Best bowling | 4/24 | 5/15 | 5/15 |
| Catches/stumpings | 8/– | 22/– | 27/– |
- Source: ESPNCricinfo, 12 March 2026

Syed Aamir Kaleem (born 20 November 1981) is a cricketer who plays for the Oman national cricket team. Aamir made his debut for the Omani national side in April 2010, aged 28. He has regularly played for the team since then.

== Early career ==
Born in Karachi, Aamir, a left-handed batsman and left-arm orthodox spinner, played youth-level matches for several Karachi-based sides. Although he was 20 years old at the time, he played a single match for the Karachi Greens under-19s side in Pakistan's Grade-II Under-19 Tournament in September 2002. The following year, Aamir, now 21, played under-19 district matches for Karachi's Zone IV. He captained the side in one match, against Zone III, and scored 101 not out in a team total of 213, coming in third in the batting order. His Zone IV teammates in later matches included two future Pakistan Test players, Khurram Manzoor and Fawad Alam. Aamir played no senior-level matches in Pakistani domestic competitions, with his last under-19 match in the country coming in July 2003.

== Move to Oman ==
After emigrating to Oman, Aamir made his debut for the national side in the 2010 ACC Trophy Elite tournament, scoring 42 runs from three 50-over matches. He established himself in the side at the 2011 ACC Twenty20 Cup, where Oman placed finished third to qualify for the 2012 World Twenty20 Qualifier. At the ACC Twenty20 Cup, Aamir played exclusively as a bowler, and took 10 wickets at an average of 9.40. He was man of the match in two games, taking 3/18 in three overs against Malaysia, and 3/11 in three overs against Nepal, with the latter victory helping Oman to a two-run win in the third-place playoff.

At the 2012 World Twenty20 Qualifier, Aamir played all seven of Oman's group matches, as well as the 15th-place playoff against Denmark, which Oman won to record its only victory of the tournament. He scored 76 runs and took three wickets, in his (and Oman's) only Twenty20 matches to date. Aamir has since appeared for Oman in several other ACC and ICC tournaments. Notable performances have included 4/15 from eight overs against Italy in the 2013 World Cricket League Division Three tournament, as well two man-of-the-match performances in the 2014 ACC Premier League – 42 not out and 3/37 against Malaysia, and 4/36 against Nepal. After the 2013 WCL Division Three tournament, where Oman was relegated to 2014 Division Four, Aamir Kaleem, fellow Karachiite Aamer Ali, and Munis Ansari were described as the "silver lining on the tour which many would like to forget as a dark chapter in Oman cricket". As of 2013, Aamir Kaleem and Aamer Ali were employed and sponsored by the Passage to India restaurant in Muscat.

== International cricket ==
In 2015, Kaleem played for Oman at the 2015 ICC World Twenty20 Qualifier, with he and the team subsequently making their Twenty20 International debuts for Oman against Afghanistan in the fifth-place playoff.

In July 2019, he was named in Oman's One Day International (ODI) squad for the 2019 Scotland Tri-Nation Series. He made his ODI debut for Oman, against Scotland, on 15 August 2019. In September 2019, he was named in Oman's squad for the 2019 ICC T20 World Cup Qualifier tournament. Ahead of the tournament, the International Cricket Council (ICC) named him as the key player in Oman's squad. On 10 October 2019, in the final match of the 2019–20 Oman Pentangular Series, Kaleem became the first bowler for Oman to take a five-wicket haul in a T20I match. He took his five wickets for 15 runs, against Nepal.

In November 2019, he was named as captain of Oman's squad for the 2019 ACC Emerging Teams Asia Cup in Bangladesh. In February 2022, in Oman's match against the United Arab Emirates in the 2021–22 Oman Quadrangular Series, Kaleem took his second five-wicket haul in T20Is.

In December 2025, Kaleem was named in Oman's squad for the 2026 T20 World Cup. He was the oldest player to participate in 2026 World Cup.
