= List of Oman ODI cricketers =

A One Day International (ODI) is an international cricket match between two representative teams, each having ODI status, as determined by the International Cricket Council (ICC). An ODI differs from Test matches in that the number of overs per team is limited, and that each team has only one innings. Oman earned One Day International (ODI) in April 2019 as a result of their performance at the 2019 ICC World Cricket League Division Two (WCL2). Oman's first ODI match was the final of the WCL2 against Namibia on 27 April 2019.

The list is arranged in the order in which each player won his first ODI cap. Where more than one player won his first ODI cap in the same match, their surnames are listed alphabetically.

== Key ==
General

- ‡ – Captain
- † – Wicket-keeper
- First – Year of debut
- Last – Year of latest game
- Mat – Number of matches played

Batting

- Runs – Runs scored in career
- HS – Highest score
- Avg – Runs scored per dismissal
- * – Batsman remained not out

Bowling

- Balls – Balls bowled in career
- Wkt – Wickets taken in career
- BBI – Best bowling in an innings
- Ave – Average runs per wicket

Fielding

- Ca – Catches taken
- St – Stumpings taken

== Players ==
Statistics are correct as of 5 May 2026.

Oman ODI cricketers
| General | | | | | Batting | | | | | Bowling | | | | | Fielding | | Ref(s) |
| Cap | Name | First | Last | Mat | Runs | HS | Avg | 50 | 100 | Balls | Wkt | BBI | Ave | 5WI | Ca | St | Ref(s) |
|---|---|---|---|---|---|---|---|---|---|---|---|---|---|---|---|---|---|
| 1 | Aqib Ilyas‡ | 2019 | 2024 | 32 | 1,234 | 109* | 44.07 | 9 | 2 | 918 | 23 | 4/36 | 31.73 | 0 | 7 | 0 | |
| 2 | Bilal Khan | 2019 | 2024 | 49 | 30 | 9 | 3.00 | 0 | 0 | 2,510 | 101 | 5/31 | 20.97 | 4 | 4 | 0 | |
| 3 | Fayyaz Butt | 2019 | 2024 | 30 | 201 | 44 | 18.27 | 0 | 0 | 1,309 | 35 | 4/79 | 35.62 | 0 | 8 | 0 | |
| 4 | Jatinder Singh‡ | 2019 | 2026 | 68 | 1,991 | 130 | 30.63 | 10 | 5 | 48 | 1 | 1/11 | 41.00 | 0 | 22 | 0 | |
| 5 | Kaleemullah | 2019 | 2024 | 46 | 141 | 20 | 8.29 | 0 | 0 | 2,052 | 42 | 3/43 | 35.28 | 0 | 10 | 0 | |
| 6 | Khawar Ali‡ | 2019 | 2022 | 34 | 626 | 79* | 27.21 | 4 | 0 | 1,591 | 42 | 5/15 | 30.11 | 1 | 19 | 0 | |
| 7 | Khurram Nawaz | 2019 | 2019 | 3 | 26 | 17* | 26.00 | 0 | 0 | – | – | – | – | – | 1 | 0 | |
| 8 | Mohammad Nadeem | 2019 | 2025 | 42 | 862 | 76* | 41.04 | 6 | 0 | 876 | 21 | 3/43 | 38.57 | 0 | 9 | 0 | |
| 9 | Sandeep Goud | 2019 | 2024 | 39 | 584 | 67* | 25.39 | 3 | 0 | 96 | 0 | – | – | – | 19 | 0 | |
| 10 | Suraj Kumar† | 2019 | 2023 | 24 | 410 | 62* | 29.28 | 2 | 0 | – | – | – | – | – | 18 | 2 | |
| 11 | Zeeshan Maqsood‡ | 2019 | 2024 | 48 | 1,273 | 109 | 30.30 | 7 | 2 | 2,219 | 58 | 4/15 | 27.15 | 0 | 24 | 0 | |
| 12 | Jay Odedra | 2019 | 2026 | 22 | 31 | 20* | 5.16 | 0 | 0 | 852 | 22 | 4/34 | 25.81 | 0 | 5 | 0 | |
| 13 | Aamir Kaleem | 2019 | 2025 | 15 | 160 | 32 | 12.30 | 0 | 0 | 680 | 18 | 4/24 | 22.77 | 0 | 8 | 0 | |
| 14 | Ajay Lalcheta | 2019 | 2019 | 2 | 18 | 12 | 9.00 | 0 | 0 | 84 | 2 | 2/35 | 31.00 | 0 | 0 | 0 | |
| 15 | Mohammad Sanuth | 2020 | 2020 | 3 | 46 | 40 | 23.00 | 0 | 0 | 60 | 0 | – | – | – | 0 | 0 | |
| 16 | Naseem Khushi† | 2020 | 2023 | 32 | 395 | 69 | 17.17 | 1 | 0 | – | – | – | – | – | 22 | 3 | |
| 17 | Badal Singh | 2020 | 2020 | 2 | 5 | 5 | 5.00 | 0 | 0 | 60 | 0 | – | – | – | 2 | 0 | |
| 18 | Ayaan Khan | 2021 | 2024 | 41 | 1,072 | 105* | 29.77 | 5 | 1 | 1,252 | 29 | 4/36 | 34.37 | 0 | 13 | 0 | |
| 19 | Nestor Dhamba | 2021 | 2022 | 10 | 34 | 11 | 8.50 | 0 | 0 | 348 | 11 | 3/20 | 22.00 | 0 | 3 | 0 | |
| 20 | Shoaib Khan | 2021 | 2024 | 31 | 843 | 105* | 31.22 | 7 | 1 | 144 | 2 | 1/19 | 65.50 | 0 | 15 | 0 | |
| 21 | Sufyan Mehmood | 2021 | 2025 | 8 | 107 | 72 | 17.83 | 1 | 0 | 209 | 6 | 3/58 | 24.50 | 0 | 0 | 0 | |
| 22 | Pruthvikumar Machhi | 2021 | 2026 | 5 | 48 | 25 | 9.60 | 0 | 0 | – | – | – | – | – | 5 | 0 | |
| 23 | Kashyap Prajapati | 2021 | 2024 | 37 | 1,048 | 103 | 29.11 | 6 | 2 | 2 | 0 | – | – | 0 | 19 | 0 | |
| 24 | Wasim Ali | 2022 | 2026 | 13 | 175 | 62 | 17.50 | 0 | 0 | 111 | 5 | 1/7 | 27.20 | 0 | 7 | 0 | |
| 25 | Adeel Shafique | 2023 | 2023 | 2 | 13 | 13 | 13.00 | 0 | 0 | – | – | – | – | – | 2 | 2 | |
| 26 | Pratik Athavale | 2024 | 2024 | 7 | 103 | 34 | 14.71 | 0 | 0 | – | – | – | – | – | 6 | 0 | |
| 27 | Khalid Kail | 2024 | 2024 | 4 | 100 | 51 | 25.00 | 1 | 0 | – | – | – | – | – | 2 | 0 | |
| 28 | Mehran Khan | 2024 | 2024 | 4 | 66 | 37 | 16.50 | 0 | 0 | 54 | 0 | – | – | 0 | 0 | 0 | |
| 29 | Karan Sonavale | 2024 | 2024 | 3 | 5 | 3 | 1.66 | 0 | 0 | 15 | 2 | 1/1 | 1.50 | 0 | 0 | 0 | |
| 30 | Shakeel Ahmed | 2024 | 2026 | 22 | 169 | 29* | 15.36 | 0 | 0 | 1222 | 49 | 5/23 | 14.44 | 1 | 3 | 0 | |
| 31 | Hammad Mirza† | 2024 | 2026 | 18 | 643 | 112* | 40.18 | 4 | 1 | – | – | – | – | – | 19 | 2 | |
| 32 | Muzahir Raza | 2024 | 2024 | 4 | 10 | 10 | 10.00 | 0 | 0 | 96 | 2 | 1/13 | 22.50 | 0 | 4 | 2 | |
| 33 | Ashish Odedara | 2024 | 2026 | 10 | 243 | 54* | 27.00 | 1 | 0 | – | – | – | – | – | 2 | 0 | |
| 34 | Samay Shrivastava | 2024 | 2026 | 14 | 22 | 7 | 11.00 | 0 | 0 | 633 | 28 | 4/25 | 19.42 | 0 | 5 | 0 | |
| 35 | Bukkapatnam Siddharth | 2024 | 2026 | 6 | 8 | 4* | 2.00 | 0 | 0 | 263 | 6 | 2/23 | 30.33 | 0 | 5 | 0 | |
| 36 | Hashir Dafedar | 2025 | 2025 | 4 | 29 | 15 | 14.50 | 0 | 0 | – | – | – | – | – | 3 | 0 | |
| 37 | Hassnain Shah | 2025 | 2026 | 10 | 85 | 42 | 17.00 | 0 | 0 | 392 | 13 | 4/26 | 29.61 | 0 | 0 | 0 | |
| 38 | Vinayak Shukla† | 2025 | 2026 | 15 | 312 | 58* | 26.00 | 0 | 0 | – | – | – | – | – | 19 | 3 | |
| 39 | Jiten Ramanandi | 2025 | 2026 | 8 | 182 | 91* | 26.00 | 0 | 0 | 270 | 2 | 1/26 | 104.50 | 0 | 3 | 0 | |
| 40 | Muhammed Imran | 2025 | 2026 | 5 | 2 | 2* | 2.00 | 0 | 0 | 192 | 10 | 5/39 | 18.80 | 1 | 0 | 0 | |
| 41 | Mujibur Ali | 2025 | 2026 | 8 | 136 | 43 | 19.42 | 0 | 0 | 207 | 3 | 2/35 | 60.66 | 0 | 3 | 0 | |
| 42 | Aryan Bisht | 2025 | 2025 | 2 | 15 | 11* | 15.00 | 0 | 0 | 18 | 0 | – | – | 0 | 2 | 0 | |
| 43 | Shah Faisal | 2026 | 2026 | 2 | 7 | 7 | 7.00 | 0 | 0 | 120 | 3 | 3/62 | 41.00 | 0 | 0 | 0 | |
| 44 | Nadeem Khan | 2026 | 2026 | 3 | 17 | 12 | 5.66 | 0 | 0 | 174 | 8 | 3/41 | 17.25 | 0 | 1 | 0 | |
| 45 | Hasnain Ul Wahab | 2026 | 2026 | 1 | 29 | 29 | 29.00 | 0 | 0 | – | – | – | – | – | 2 | 0 | |

== See also ==
- List of Oman Twenty20 International cricketers
