= Mark Watt =

Scottish cricketer (born 1996)

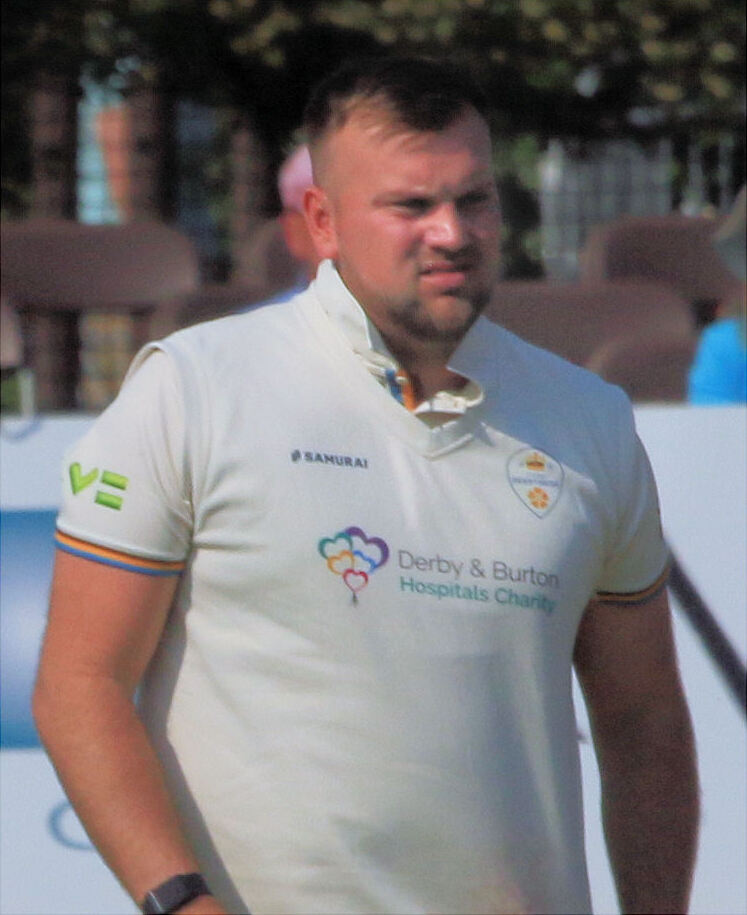
- Watt bowling for Derbyshire (2023)

Personal information
- Full name: Mark Robert James Watt
- Born: 29 July 1996 (age 30); Edinburgh, Scotland
- Batting: Left-handed
- Bowling: Slow left-arm orthodox
- Role: Bowler

International information
- National side: Scotland (2015–present)
- ODI debut (cap 61): 8 September 2016 v Hong Kong
- Last ODI: 13 August 2026 v Canada
- T20I debut (cap 40): 18 June 2015 v Ireland
- Last T20I: 18 April 2026 v Namibia

Domestic team information
- Years: Team
- 2018: Lancashire
- 2019, 2022–2023: Derbyshire
- 2026: Edinburgh Castle Rockers

Career statistics
Competition	ODI	T20I	FC	LA
Matches	92	83	12	123
Runs scored	932	321	257	1,110
Batting average	21.67	11.06	25.70	18.81
100s/50s	0/2	0/0	0/2	0/2
Top score	66	31*	81*	66
Balls bowled	4,732	1,747	2,238	6,141
Wickets	121	94	32	142
Bowling average	28.00	21.98	35.53	32.47
5 wickets in innings	1	1	1	1
10 wickets in match	0	0	0	0
Best bowling	5/33	5/27	5/83	5/33
Catches/stumpings	31/–	18/–	4/–	39/–
- Source: Cricinfo, 15 August 2026

Mark Robert James Watt (born 29 July 1996) is a Scottish cricketer.

== Early life ==
Watt attended the Trinity Academy in Edinburgh, and became a cricketer after a knee injury prevented him from playing football.

== Domestic and franchise career ==
Watt made his List A debut in the 2015–17 ICC World Cricket League Championship on 31 July 2015 against Nepal. He made his first-class debut in the 2015–17 ICC Intercontinental Cup on 9 August 2016 against the United Arab Emirates.

In July 2019, Watt was selected to play for the Edinburgh Rocks in the inaugural edition of the Euro T20 Slam cricket tournament. However, the following month the tournament was cancelled.

In March 2022, Watt was re-signed by Derbyshire County Cricket Club to play in the 2022 T20 Blast in England.

== International career ==
Watt made his Twenty20 International debut against Ireland on 18 June 2015. On 5 February 2016 he took his first five-wicket haul in a T20I match, picking up five wickets for 27 runs against the Netherlands in the UAE. He made his One Day International (ODI) debut against Hong Kong on 8 September 2016.

In September 2019, he was named in Scotland's squad for the 2019 ICC T20 World Cup Qualifier tournament in the United Arab Emirates. In May 2021, during the ODI series against the Netherlands, Watt took his 100th wicket in international cricket for Scotland. In September 2021, Watt was named in Scotland's provisional squad for the 2021 ICC Men's T20 World Cup.

In April 2022, in the 2022 Papua New Guinea Tri-Nation Series match against Oman, Watt played in his 100th international match for Scotland.

In May 2024, Watt was named in Scotland's squad for the 2024 ICC Men's T20 World Cup tournament.
