= Khurram Nawaz =

Pakistani-born cricketer (born 1986)

Personal information
- Full name: Khurram Nawaz Khan
- Born: 30 January 1986 (age 40); Rawalpindi, Punjab, Pakistan
- Batting: Right-handed
- Role: Middle order batter

International information
- National side: Oman (2017–2022)
- ODI debut (cap 7): 27 April 2019 v Namibia
- Last ODI: 18 August 2019 v Scotland
- T20I debut (cap 19): 15 January 2017 v Netherlands
- Last T20I: 22 February 2022 v Ireland
- Source: Cricinfo, 22 February 2022

Khurram Nawaz (born 30 January 1986) is a Pakistani-born cricketer who plays for the Oman national cricket team.

== Early life ==
Khurram Nawaz was born on 30 January 1986 in Rawalpindi, Pakistan.

== Career ==
Nawaz made his Twenty20 International (T20I) debut for Oman in the 2017 Desert T20 Challenge against the Netherlands on 15 January 2017. He made his List A debut for Oman against Scotland on 19 February 2019, following the 2018–19 Oman Quadrangular Series.

In March 2019, he was named in Oman's team for the 2019 ICC World Cricket League Division Two tournament in Namibia. Oman finished in the top four places in the tournament, therefore gaining One Day International (ODI) status. Nawaz made his ODI debut for Oman on 27 April 2019, against Namibia, in the tournament's final.

In September 2019, he was named in Oman's squad for the 2019 ICC T20 World Cup Qualifier tournament. In November 2019, he was named in Oman's squad for the 2019 ACC Emerging Teams Asia Cup in Bangladesh. In September 2021, he was named in Oman's squad for the 2021 ICC Men's T20 World Cup.
