= Nestor Dhamba =

Indian-born cricketer

Personal information
- Born: 19 February 1990 (age 36); Thane, Maharashtra, India
- Batting: Right-handed
- Bowling: Right-arm offbreak

International information
- National side: Oman
- ODI debut (cap 19): 14 September 2021 v Nepal
- Last ODI: 12 June 2022 v USA
- Only T20I (cap 31): 24 February 2022 v Nepal

Career statistics
Competition	ODI
Matches	9
Runs scored	34
Batting average	8.50
100s/50s	0/0
Top score	11
Balls bowled	300
Wickets	10
Bowling average	19.40
5 wickets in innings	0
10 wickets in match	0
Best bowling	3/20
Catches/stumpings	3/–
- Source: ESPNcricinfo, 12 June 2022

Nestor Dhamba (born 19 February 1990) is an Indian-born cricketer who plays for the Oman national cricket team. He played in their opening fixture of the 2017 ICC World Cricket League Division Three tournament, against the United States. In October 2018, he was named in Oman's squad for the 2018 ICC World Cricket League Division Three tournament.

In December 2018, he was named in Oman's team for the 2018 ACC Emerging Teams Asia Cup. In September 2021, he was named in Oman's squad for the 2021 ICC Men's T20 World Cup. He was one of two uncapped players to be named in Oman's squad. He was also named in Oman's One Day International (ODI) squad for their tri-series in Oman. He made his ODI debut on 14 September 2021, for Oman against Nepal.

In February 2022, he was named in Oman's Twenty20 International (T20I) squad for the 2021–22 Oman Quadrangular Series. He made his T20I debut on 24 February 2022, for Oman against Nepal in the 2022 ICC Men's T20 World Cup Global Qualifier A tournament.
