= Aqib Ilyas =

Pakistani cricketer (born 1992)

Personal information
- Full name: Aqib Ilyas Sulehri
- Born: 5 September 1992 (age 34); Sialkot, Pakistan
- Batting: Right-handed
- Bowling: Right-arm off spin
- Role: Top order batter
- Relatives: Adnan Ilyas (brother)

International information
- National side: Oman (2015-2024)
- ODI debut (cap 1): 27 April 2019 v Namibia
- Last ODI: 21 April 2023 v Nepal
- T20I debut (cap 13): 21 November 2015 v Hong Kong
- Last T20I: 5 November 2023 v Nepal

Domestic team information
- Years: Team
- 2024: Biratnagar Kings

Career statistics
Competition	ODI	T20I	LA	T20
Matches	15	25	28	25
Runs scored	744	501	1042	501
Batting average	62.00	25.05	41.68	25.05
100s/50s	2/5	0/3	2/6	0/3
Top score	109*	60	109*	60
Balls bowled	516	102	642	102
Wickets	19	2	21	2
Bowling average	17.15	58.50	20.42	58.50
5 wickets in innings	0	0	0	0
10 wickets in match	0	0	0	0
Best bowling	4/36	1/9	4/36	1/9
Catches/stumpings	5/–	7/–	11/–	7/–
- Source: ESPNcricinfo, 21 September 2023

Aqib Ilyas Sulehri (born 5 September 1992) is a Pakistani-born cricketer who has played for the Oman national cricket team since 2015. He is a right-handed top-order batsman and also bowls off-spin.

== Personal life ==
Ilyas was born on 5 September 1992 in Sialkot, Pakistan. He is the younger brother of Adnan Ilyas who also played international cricket for Oman.

His family moved to Oman when Ilyas was six months old. He grew up in Muscat. In 2010 he moved to Dubai to attend university, studying civil engineering. He was invited to train with the United Arab Emirates national cricket team, but opted to return to Oman after completing his degree.

In 2021, Ilyas found a tumour on his ankle bone. It was removed via surgery and confirmed as benign, but required a rehabilitation period of 18 months.

== Career ==
Ilyas made his Twenty20 International (T20I) debut for Oman against Hong Kong on 21 November 2015.

In January 2018, he was named in Oman's squad for the 2018 ICC World Cricket League Division Two tournament. He made his List A debut for Oman against Canada on 8 February 2018.

In August 2018, he was named in Oman's squad for the 2018 Asia Cup Qualifier tournament. He was the leading run-scorer for Oman in the tournament, with 186 runs in five matches. In October 2018, he was named in Oman's squad for the 2018 ICC World Cricket League Division Three tournament. He scored a century in Oman's match against the United States. In December 2018, he was named in Oman's team for the 2018 ACC Emerging Teams Asia Cup.

In March 2019, he was named in Oman's team for the 2019 ICC World Cricket League Division Two tournament in Namibia. Oman finished in the top four places in the tournament, therefore gaining One Day International (ODI) status. Ilyas made his ODI debut for Oman on 27 April 2019, against Namibia, in the tournament's final. He was the leading run-scorer for Oman in the tournament, with 168 runs in six matches.

In September 2019, he was named as the vice-captain of Oman's squad for the 2019 ICC T20 World Cup Qualifier tournament. Ahead of the tournament, the International Cricket Council (ICC) named him as the player to watch in Oman's squad. In November 2019, he was named as vice-captain of Oman's squad for the 2019 ACC Emerging Teams Asia Cup in Bangladesh.

On 9 February 2020, in the 2020 Nepal Tri-Nation Series match against Nepal, Ilyas scored an unbeaten 109 runs from 108 balls. It was the first century by a batsman for Oman in ODI cricket. Two days later, against the United States, Ilyas scored his second century in as many matches, with 105 runs.

In September 2021, he was named as the vice-captain of Oman's squad for the 2021 ICC Men's T20 World Cup.

In May 2024, Ilyas was named as the captain of Oman's squad for the 2024 ICC Men's T20 World Cup.
