= Fayyaz Butt =

Pakistani-born cricketer (born 1993)

Personal information
- Full name: Ahmad Fayyaz Butt
- Born: 17 August 1993 (age 33); Sialkot, Punjab, Pakistan
- Bowling: Right-arm medium-fast
- Role: Bowler

International information
- National side: Oman (2019–2023)
- ODI debut (cap 3): 27 April 2019 v Namibia
- Last ODI: 21 April 2023 v Nepal
- T20I debut (cap 22): 13 February 2019 v Ireland
- Last T20I: 16 November 2022 v Canada

Career statistics
Competition	ODI	T20I	LA	T20
Matches	12	22	26	22
Runs scored	52	83	144	83
Batting average	17.33	13.83	20.57	13.83
100s/50s	0/0	0/0	0/0	0/0
Top score	32*	25*	45	25*
Balls bowled	501	417	1,154	417
Wickets	13	20	36	20
Bowling average	33.15	25.45	27.27	25.45
5 wickets in innings	0	0	0	0
10 wickets in match	0	0	0	0
Best bowling	3/28	3/16	4/46	3/16
Catches/stumpings	3/–	5/–	5/–	5/–
- Source: Cricinfo, 27 April 2023

Fayyaz Butt (born 17 August 1993) is a Pakistani-born cricketer who plays for the Oman national cricket team.

== Early life ==
Fayyaz Butt was born on 17 August 1993 in Sialkot, Pakistan.

== Career ==
Butt made his List A debut for Oman in the 2018 ICC World Cricket League Division Two tournament on 8 February 2018. Prior to his List A debut, he was named in Pakistan's squad for the 2010 Under-19 Cricket World Cup.

In August 2018, he was named in Oman's squad for the 2018 Asia Cup Qualifier tournament, and in October 2018 for the 2018 ICC World Cricket League Division Three tournament.

In December 2018, he was named in Oman's team for the 2018 ACC Emerging Teams Asia Cup. In February 2019, he was named in Oman's Twenty20 International (T20I) squad for the 2018–19 Oman Quadrangular Series in Oman. He made his T20I debut for Oman against Ireland on 13 February 2019.

In March 2019, he was named in Oman's team for the 2019 ICC World Cricket League Division Two tournament in Namibia. Oman finished in the top four places in the tournament, therefore gaining One Day International (ODI) status. Butt made his ODI debut on 27 April 2019, against Namibia, in the tournament's final. He was the leading wicket-taker for Oman in the tournament, with 16 dismissals in six matches.

In September 2019, he was named in Oman's squad for the 2019 ICC T20 World Cup Qualifier tournament. In November 2019, he was named in Oman's squad for the 2019 ACC Emerging Teams Asia Cup in Bangladesh. In September 2021, he was named in Oman's squad for the 2021 ICC Men's T20 World Cup.

In May 2024, he was named in Oman's squad for the 2024 ICC Men's T20 World Cup tournament.
