= Zeeshan Maqsood =

Pakistani-born cricketer (born 1987)

Personal information
- Full name: Zeeshan Maqsood
- Born: 24 October 1987 (age 39); Chichawatni, Punjab, Pakistan
- Batting: Left-handed
- Bowling: Slow left-arm orthodox
- Role: Opening batsman

International information
- National side: Oman (2015–2024)
- ODI debut (cap 11): 27 April 2019 v Namibia
- Last ODI: 29 April 2023 v United Arab Emirates
- T20I debut (cap 10): 25 July 2015 v Afghanistan
- Last T20I: 3 June 2024 v Namibia

Domestic team information
- Years: Team
- 2017: Kabul Eagles

Career statistics
Competition	ODI	T20I	LA	T20
Matches	31	41	43	52
Runs scored	782	770	1,169	1,065
Batting average	28.96	27.50	32.47	28.78
100s/50s	1/4	1/3	2/6	0/5
Top score	109	102*	109	102*
Balls bowled	1,463	540	1,821	665
Wickets	40	26	51	36
Bowling average	25.12	23.88	24.29	21.61
5 wickets in innings	0	0	0	0
10 wickets in match	0	0	0	0
Best bowling	4/15	4/7	4/14	4/7
Catches/stumpings	15/–	10/–	21/–	11/–
- Source: Cricinfo, 29 April 2023

Zeeshan Maqsood (born 24 October 1987) is a Pakistani-born cricketer who plays for the Oman national cricket team and is a former captain of the national team. He has played for the team since 2012 and represented Oman at the 2016 and 2021 ICC Men's T20 World Cups. In January 2022, the International Cricket Council (ICC) named Maqsood as the ICC Men's Associate Cricketer of the Year.

== Personal life ==
Maqsood was born in Chichawatni, Punjab, Pakistan. He moved to Oman in his early teens. He became a cricketer with the help of Manzoor Elahi and Saleem Elahi. His ancestors lived in Hoshiarpur, Punjab, India, prior to partition.

== International career ==
Zeeshan debuted for Oman at the 2012 ACC Trophy Elite, scoring 199 runs on debut against Bhutan. He played in the 2014 ICC World Cricket League Division Four tournament. He made his Twenty20 International debut against Afghanistan in the 2015 ICC World Twenty20 Qualifier tournament on 25 July 2015. He was the leading run-scorer in the 2016 ICC World Cricket League Division Five, scoring a total of 350 runs during the tournament. He made his List A debut for Oman in their three-match series against the United Arab Emirates in October 2016.

In January 2018, he was named in Oman's squad for the 2018 ICC World Cricket League Division Two tournament.

=== Captain ===
In August 2018, Zeeshan was named the captain of Oman's squad for the 2018 Asia Cup Qualifier tournament. In October 2018, he was named as the captain of Oman's squad for the 2018 ICC World Cricket League Division Three tournament. In December 2018, he was named as the captain of Oman's team for the 2018 ACC Emerging Teams Asia Cup.

In March 2019, he was named as the captain of Oman's team for the 2019 ICC World Cricket League Division Two tournament in Namibia. Oman finished in the top four places in the tournament, therefore gaining One Day International (ODI) status. Maqsood made his ODI debut as captain of the Oman team on 27 April 2019, against Namibia, in the tournament's final.

In September 2019, he was named as the captain of Oman's squad for the 2019 ICC T20 World Cup Qualifier tournament. On 11 February 2020, against the United States, he scored his first century in ODI cricket, with 109 runs.

In September 2021, he was named as the captain of Oman's squad for the 2021 ICC Men's T20 World Cup.

In May 2024, Zeeshan was selected for Oman's team for the 2024 ICC Men's T20 World Cup, but his captaincy was transferred to Aqib Ilyas.
