= Sandeep Goud =

Indian-born cricketer (born 1991)

Personal information
- Full name: Sandeep Goud
- Born: 8 November 1991 (age 35); Hyderabad, Telangana, India
- Batting: Right-handed
- Bowling: Right arm medium
- Role: All-rounder

International information
- National side: Oman
- ODI debut (cap 9): 27 April 2019 v Namibia
- Last ODI: 29 April 2023 v United Arab Emirates
- T20I debut (cap 24): 15 February 2019 v Netherlands
- Last T20I: 21 November 2022 v Canada

Career statistics
Competition	ODI	T20I
Matches	31	22
Runs scored	476	111
Batting average	26.44	13.87
100s/50s	0/3	0/0
Top score	67*	31*
Balls bowled	96	48
Wickets	0	2
Bowling average	–	38.00
5 wickets in innings	–	0
10 wickets in match	–	0
Best bowling	–	2/36
Catches/stumpings	17/–	7/–
- Source: Cricinfo, 29 April 2023

Sandeep Goud (born 8 November 1991) is an Indian-born cricketer who plays for the Oman national cricket team. In February 2019, he was named in Oman's Twenty20 International (T20I) squad for the 2018–19 Oman Quadrangular Series in Oman. He made his T20I debut against the Netherlands on 15 February 2019. Five days prior to his T20I debut, he played in Oman's Development XI team, in a 20-over fixture against Ireland, top-scoring with 55 not out. He made his List A debut against Scotland on 19 February 2019, following the 2018–19 Oman Quadrangular Series.

In March 2019, he was named in Oman's team for the 2019 ICC World Cricket League Division Two tournament in Namibia. Oman finished in the top four places in the tournament, therefore gaining One Day International (ODI) status. Goud made his ODI debut for Oman on 27 April 2019, against Namibia, in the tournament's final.

In September 2019, he was named in Oman's squad for the 2019 ICC T20 World Cup Qualifier tournament. In November 2019, he was named in Oman's squad for the 2019 ACC Emerging Teams Asia Cup in Bangladesh. In September 2021, he was named in Oman's squad for the 2021 ICC Men's T20 World Cup.
