= Bilal Khan (cricketer) =

Pakistani cricketer (born 1987)

Personal information
- Born: 10 April 1987 (age 39); Peshawar, Khyber Pakhtunkhwa, Pakistan
- Batting: Left-handed
- Bowling: Left-arm fast-medium
- Role: Bowler

International information
- National side: Oman (2015–2023)
- ODI debut (cap 2): 27 April 2019 v Namibia
- Last ODI: 3 July 2023 v Netherlands
- T20I debut (cap 14): 21 November 2015 v Hong Kong
- Last T20I: 5 November 2023 v Nepal

Domestic team information
- Years: Team
- 2024: Chattogram Challengers

Career statistics
Competition	ODI	T20I
Matches	32	46
Runs scored	25	25
Batting average	4.16	4.16
100s/50s	0/0	0/0
Top score	9	6*
Balls bowled	1,673	973
Wickets	69	63
Bowling average	18.53	16.50
5 wickets in innings	3	0
10 wickets in match	0	0
Best bowling	5/31	4/19
Catches/stumpings	3/–	9/–
- Source: Cricinfo, 29 April 2023

Bilal Khan (born 10 April 1987) is a Pakistani-born cricketer who has played for the Oman national cricket team since 2015. He is a left-arm fast bowler. He represented Oman at the 2016 and 2021 ICC Men's T20 World Cups.

== Personal life ==
Khan was born in Peshawar, Pakistan. He moved to Oman in 2011 to work in Muscat.

== Domestic career ==
In Pakistan, Khan played first-class cricket for Peshawar from 2007 to 2009.

He represented Chattogram Challengers in 2024 Bangladesh Premier League where he took 15 wickets in just 13 matches, becoming one of the highest wicket takers in the tournament.

He was selected to play for Durbar Rajshahi in 2025 Bangladesh Premier League.

== Career ==
Khan qualified to play for Oman in 2015 after completing four years of residency. He made his Twenty20 International debut for Oman against Hong Kong on 21 November 2015. He was the top wicket-taker in the series, with seven dismissals.

In January 2018, he was named in Oman's squad for the 2018 ICC World Cricket League Division Two tournament. He made his List A debut for Oman against Canada on 8 February 2018.

In August 2018, he was named in Oman's squad for the 2018 Asia Cup Qualifier tournament. He was the leading wicket-taker for Oman in the tournament, with ten dismissals in five matches. He was a member of Oman's squad for the 2018 ICC World Cricket League Division Three tournament. Ahead of the tournament, he was named as the player to watch in Oman's squad. He finished the tournament as the leading wicket-taker, with twelve dismissals in five matches, and was named as the player of the series. In December 2018, he was named in Oman's team for the 2018 ACC Emerging Teams Asia Cup.

In March 2019, he was named in Oman's team for the 2019 ICC World Cricket League Division Two tournament in Namibia. Oman finished in the top four places in the tournament, therefore gaining One Day International (ODI) status. Khan made his ODI debut for Oman on 27 April 2019, against Namibia, in the tournament's final.

In September 2019, he was named in Oman's squad for the 2019 ICC T20 World Cup Qualifier tournament. He was the leading wicket-taker in the tournament, with eighteen dismissals in nine matches. In September 2021, he was named in Oman's squad for the 2021 ICC Men's T20 World Cup, with the International Cricket Council (ICC) later naming him as the key player in Oman's team.

In March 2022, in the opening match of the 2022 United Arab Emirates Tri-Nation Series, Khan took his first five-wicket haul in an ODI match, with 5/31 from 9.5 overs.

In May 2024, Bilal was named in Oman's squad for the 2024 ICC Men's T20 World Cup tournament.
