= Khawar Ali =

Pakistani-born cricketer (born 1985)

Personal information
- Full name: Khawar Ali
- Born: 20 December 1985 (age 40); Rawalpindi, Punjab, Pakistan
- Batting: Right-handed
- Bowling: Right-arm leg break
- Role: All-rounder

International information
- National side: Oman (2015-2022)
- ODI debut (cap 6): 27 April 2019 v Namibia
- Last ODI: 14 June 2022 v Nepal
- T20I debut (cap 5): 25 July 2015 v Afghanistan
- Last T20I: 22 February 2022 v Ireland

Career statistics
Competition	ODI	T20I	T20
Matches	30	41	44
Runs scored	581	626	671
Batting average	29.05	19.56	19.17
100s/50s	0/4	0/2	0/2
Top score	79*	72*	72*
Balls bowled	1,375	716	746
Wickets	35	46	47
Bowling average	30.91	17.17	17.57
5 wickets in innings	1	0	0
10 wickets in match	0	0	0
Best bowling	5/15	4/11	4/11
Catches/stumpings	16/–	15/–	15/–
- Source: Cricinfo, 14 June 2022

Khawar Ali (born 20 December 1985) is a Pakistani-born cricketer who plays for the Oman national cricket team as an all-rounder.

== Early life ==
Khawar Ali was born in Rawalpindi in the Punjab province of Pakistan.

== Career ==
He made his Twenty20 International debut for Oman against Afghanistan in the 2015 ICC World Twenty20 Qualifier tournament on 25 July 2015. He made his List A debut in Oman's three-match series against the United Arab Emirates in October 2016.

At the 2016 ICC World Cricket League Division Four tournament, he was named man of the series.

In 2018, he was part of Oman's squad for the 2018 ICC World Cricket League Division Two tournament. He was named their vice-captain for the 2018 Asia Cup Qualifier tournament as well as the 2018 ICC World Cricket League Division Three tournament. In December 2018, he was named in Oman's team for the 2018 ACC Emerging Teams Asia Cup.

In March 2019, he was named as the vice-captain of Oman's team for the 2019 ICC World Cricket League Division Two tournament in Namibia. Oman finished in the top four places in the tournament, therefore gaining One Day International (ODI) status. Ali made his ODI debut for Oman on 27 April 2019, against Namibia, in the tournament's final.

In September 2019, he was named in Oman's squad for the 2019 ICC T20 World Cup Qualifier tournament. On 9 October 2019, in the match against the Netherlands in the 2019–20 Oman Pentangular Series, he took a hat-trick. In September 2021, he was named in Oman's squad for the 2021 ICC Men's T20 World Cup. The following month, in round seven of the 2019–2023 ICC Cricket World Cup League 2 tournament, Ali took his first five-wicket haul in ODI cricket, with his 5 for 15 in the win against Papua New Guinea helping Oman strengthen its lead at the top of the points table with 26 points from 17 games.
