= Kaleemullah (cricketer) =

Pakistani-born cricketer (born 1990)

Personal information
- Born: 24 December 1990 (age 35); Gujranwala, Punjab, Pakistan
- Batting: Right-handed
- Bowling: Right-arm medium
- Role: Bowler

International information
- National side: Oman
- ODI debut (cap 5): 27 April 2019 v Namibia
- Last ODI: 29 April 2023 v United Arab Emirates
- T20I debut (cap 18): 15 January 2017 v Netherlands
- Last T20I: 21 November 2022 v Canada

Career statistics
Competition	ODI	T20I
Matches	30	18
Runs scored	107	64
Batting average	13.37	10.66
100s/50s	0/0	0/0
Top score	20	15
Balls bowled	1,338	343
Wickets	31	15
Bowling average	29.83	25.73
5 wickets in innings	0	0
10 wickets in match	0	0
Best bowling	3/43	2/5
Catches/stumpings	6/–	2/–
- Source: ESPNcricinfo, 29 April 2023

Kaleemullah (born 24 December 1990) is a Pakistani-born cricketer who plays for the Oman national cricket team.

== Early life ==
Kaleemullah was born on 24 December 1990 in Gujranwala, Pakistan.

== Career ==
Kaleemullah made his Twenty20 International (T20I) debut for Oman in the 2017 Desert T20 Challenge against the Netherlands on 15 January 2017. He was part of Oman's squad for the 2018 ICC World Cricket League Division Two tournament. He made his List A debut for Oman on 8 February 2018.

In August 2018, he was named in Oman's squad for the 2018 Asia Cup Qualifier tournament. In October 2018, he was named in Oman's squad for the 2018 ICC World Cricket League Division Three tournament. In December 2018, he was named in Oman's team for the 2018 ACC Emerging Teams Asia Cup.

In March 2019, he was named in Oman's team for the 2019 ICC World Cricket League Division Two tournament in Namibia. Oman finished in the top four places in the tournament, therefore gaining One Day International (ODI) status. Kaleemullah made his ODI debut on 27 April 2019, against Namibia, in the tournament's final.

In September 2019, he was named in Oman's squad for the 2019 ICC T20 World Cup Qualifier tournament. In November 2019, he was named in Oman's squad for the 2019 ACC Emerging Teams Asia Cup in Bangladesh. In September 2021, he was named in Oman's squad for the 2021 ICC Men's T20 World Cup.

In May 2024, he was named in Oman's squad for the 2024 ICC Men's T20 World Cup.
