= Mohammad Nadeem (Oman cricketer) =

Pakistani-born cricketer (born 1982)

Mohammad Nadeem Bhalli
Personal information
- Born: 4 September 1982 (age 44); Sialkot, Punjab, Pakistan
- Batting: Right-handed
- Bowling: Right-arm medium-fast
- Role: Bowler

International information
- National side: Oman (2014–present)
- ODI debut (cap 8): 27 April 2019 v Namibia
- Last ODI: 27 May 2025 v USA
- T20I debut (cap 6): 25 July 2015 v Afghanistan
- Last T20I: 23 February 2025 v USA

Career statistics
| Competition | ODI | T20I | LA | T20 |
|---|---|---|---|---|
| Matches | 42 | 61 | 60 | 70 |
| Runs scored | 862 | 641 | 1220 | 722 |
| Batting average | 41.04 | 20.03 | 34.85 | 19.00 |
| 100s/50s | 0/6 | 0/2 | 0/8 | 0/2 |
| Top score | 76* | 77 | 76* | 77 |
| Balls bowled | 876 | 549 | 1,082 | 957 |
| Wickets | 21 | 34 | 38 | 38 |
| Bowling average | 38.57 | 31.79 | 31.78 | 32.39 |
| 5 wickets in innings | 0 | 0 | 0 | 0 |
| 10 wickets in match | 0 | 0 | 0 | 0 |
| Best bowling | 3/43 | 4/23 | 4/47 | 4/23 |
| Catches/stumpings | 9/– | 24/– | 12/– | 25/– |
- Source: Cricinfo, 27 May 2025

Mohammad Nadeem (born 4 September 1982) is a Pakistani-born cricketer who has played for the Oman national cricket team since 2014.

== Early life ==
Nadeem was born on 4 September 1982 in Sialkot, Pakistan. He started playing cricket at the age of 10 at a ground close to his school in Sahowala.

== Career ==
=== Early appearances for Oman (2014–2016) ===
Nadeem played his first matches for Oman in the 2014 ACC Premier League. His international debut was against Nepal at Selangor Turf Club on 1 May 2014. He bowled four overs and conceded 21 runs and scored 12 runs with the bat in a two-wicket win for Oman. He played three matches in the tournament but did not take any wickets. Nadeem was then included in Oman's squad for the 2014 ICC World Cricket League Division Four, but he did not play a match during the tournament and he was subsequently included then withdrawn from their squad for the 2015 ACC Twenty20 Cup.

Nadeem returned to Oman's national team for the 2015 ICC World Twenty20 Qualifier. During the tournament, he made his Twenty20 debut against Canada, taking the wicket of Canadian captain Rizwan Cheema. Oman progressed to a fifth-place playoff match against Afghanistan, and as a result they earned Twenty20 International status for the first time. This meant that Nadeem was able to make his Twenty20 International debut on 25 July 2015.

During the 2015–16 cricket season, Oman's national team spent time in the United Arab Emirates playing matches against various international teams. Nadeem was in Oman's squad, but he was left out of the team for most of the matches. He did get to play his second Twenty20 International in the final match of the tour against Afghanistan again. After the tour Nadeem was included in Oman's squads for the 2016 Asia Cup and the 2016 ICC World Twenty20. He had a successful home season, helping Assarain to win Oman's T20 Premier Division, and was considered likely to play for Oman in the 2016 ICC World Cricket League Division Five, though he was not included in Oman's squad for the tournament.

=== Regular national squad member (2016–present) ===
Nadeem returned to Oman's squad for the team's one-day series against the United Arab Emirates in October 2016. He made his List A cricket debut in the second match of the series, scoring 42 runs and taking a wicket. After the series he played for Oman in the 2016 ICC World Cricket League Division Four in the United States. He was one of Oman's most successful bowlers for the series, taking seven wickets and bowling at an economy rate of 3.67 runs per over. After playing these games in the one-day format of cricket, Nadeem was also kept in Oman's team for the Twenty20 tournament the 2017 Desert T20 Challenge. He was Oman's best bowler in their loss to Netherlands with bowling figures of 2/24 from his 4 overs, but he was only able to take one more wicket for the tournament despite Oman progressing to the semi-finals.

He was a member of Oman's squad for the 2018 ICC World Cricket League Division Two tournament, and for the 2018 Asia Cup Qualifier tournament. In October 2018, he was named in Oman's squad for the 2018 ICC World Cricket League Division Three tournament and in December 2018 for the 2018 ACC Emerging Teams Asia Cup.

In March 2019, he was named in Oman's team for the 2019 ICC World Cricket League Division Two tournament in Namibia. He was named as one of the six players to watch during the tournament. Oman finished in the top four places in the tournament, therefore gaining One Day International (ODI) status. Nadeem made his ODI debut for Oman on 27 April 2019, against Namibia, in the tournament's final.

In November 2019, he was named in Oman's squad for the 2019 ACC Emerging Teams Asia Cup in Bangladesh. In September 2021, he was named in Oman's squad for the 2021 ICC Men's T20 World Cup. In May 2024, he was named in Oman's squad for the 2024 ICC Men's T20 World Cup tournament.

In December 2025, Nadeem was named in Oman's squad for the 2026 T20 World Cup.
