= Jatinder Singh =

Indian-born cricketer

Personal information
- Full name: Jatinder Singh
- Born: 5 March 1989 (age 37); Ludhiana, Punjab, India
- Nickname: Jati
- Batting: Right-handed
- Bowling: Right-arm off break
- Role: Batsman, occasional wicket-keeper

International information
- National side: Oman (2011–present)
- ODI debut (cap 4): 27 April 2019 v Namibia
- Last ODI: 27 May 2025 v United States
- T20I debut (cap 4): 25 July 2015 v Afghanistan
- Last T20I: 20 February 2026 v Australia

Career statistics
Competition	ODI	T20I	LA	T20
Matches	61	76	82	89
Runs scored	1,704	1,635	2,239	2,061
Batting average	29.37	23.69	28.70	25.76
100s/50s	4/9	0/9	5/12	0/7
Top score	118*	73*	131*	73*
Catches/stumpings	20/–	23/–	32/–	25/–
- Source: ESPNcricinfo, 17 March 2026

Jatinder Singh (born 5 March 1989) is an Indian-born cricketer who plays for the Oman national cricket team. He made his debut for the Omani national side at the 2011 World Cricket League Division Three tournament. He is a right-handed top-order batsman.

== Early life and education ==
Singh was born on 5 March 1989 in Ludhiana, Punjab, India. He is a member of the Ramgarhia carpenter caste within the Sikh community. His father, Gurmail Singh, immigrated to Oman in 1975 to work for the Royal Oman Police as a carpenter. He moved to Oman in 2003 with his mother Paramjeet Kaur and three siblings, attending the Indian School, Muscat.

Singh represented the Omani under-19 side in five matches at the 2007 ACC Under-19 Elite Cup. He served as Oman's wicket-keeper in the tournament, where, unusually, all five of his dismissals were stumpings. Three of those stumpings came in the same match, against the Hong Kong under-19s.

== Senior debut ==
Jatinder made his senior debut for Oman in January 2011, aged 20, playing two matches in the WCL Division Three tournament. Both of these were against Italy. He was dismissed for a golden duck on debut in the group stages, caught by Hayden Patrizi off of Vince Pennazza, and did not bat in the third-place playoff, which Oman won.

Jatinder played two further matches for Oman at the 2011 ACC Twenty20 Cup, where they finished third to qualify for the 2012 World Twenty20 Qualifier in the United Arab Emirates. At the World Twenty20 Qualifier, Oman lost all seven of their group matches to finish bottom of Group B, but defeated Denmark in the 15th-place playoff. Jatinder played in only four matches at the tournament – he was first included in the team for their second match, against Uganda, but made no further appearances until towards the tournament's end, playing in the final two group matches against Namibia and Ireland, and then in the 15th-place playoff. Jatinder opened the batting with Zeeshan Siddiqui in the final three matches, scoring consecutive half-centuries in the final two matches. Against Ireland, he recorded 56 not out in Oman's total of 116/6, the highest score of the game, and against Denmark, he again scored 56, featuring in a 113-run opening partnership with Zeeshan, who made 67 from 36 balls. Despite featuring in only half the team's matches, Jatinder finished the tournament with 136 runs at an average of 45.33, making him the team's leading run-getter and placing him sixth in the overall batting averages.

== Later career ==
Since the 2012 World Twenty20 Qualifier, Jatinder has featured regularly for Oman in ACC and ICC limited-overs tournaments, including the 2012 and 2014 ACC Premier League tournaments, the 2013 and 2015 ACC Twenty20 Cups, and the 2013 WCL Division Three and 2014 WCL Division Four tournaments. Against Jersey in the fifth-place playoff of the latter tournament, he scored 90 runs from 110 balls, for which he was named man of the match. At the 2015 ACC Twenty20 Cup, played in the UAE, Oman placed first to qualify for the 2015 World Twenty20 Qualifier. Jatinder was adjudged "Best Batsman" at the tournament, after innings of 45 against Saudi Arabia (from 31 balls, and including three sixes), 62 against Malaysia (from 41 balls, and including four sixes), and 70 against Singapore (from 37 balls).

Jatinder made his Twenty20 International debut for Oman in the fifth-place playoff of the 2015 World Twenty20 Qualifier, against Afghanistan. He made his List A debut in Oman's three-match series against the United Arab Emirates in October 2016.

In January 2018, he was named in Oman's squad for the 2018 World Cricket League Division Two tournament. In August 2018, he was named in Oman's squad for the 2018 Asia Cup Qualifier tournament. In October 2018, he was named in Oman's squad for the 2018 World Cricket League Division Three tournament. He was the leading run-scorer for Oman in the tournament, with 225 runs in five matches. In December 2018, he was named in Oman's team for the 2018 Emerging Teams Asia Cup.

In March 2019, he was named in Oman's team for the 2019 World Cricket League Division Two tournament in Namibia. Oman finished in the top four places in the tournament, therefore gaining One Day International (ODI) status. Singh made his ODI debut on 27 April 2019, against Namibia, in the tournament's final.

In September 2019, he was named in Oman's squad for the 2019 T20 World Cup Qualifier tournament. He was the leading run-scorer for Oman in the tournament, with 267 runs in nine matches. In November 2019, he was named in Oman's squad for the 2019 Emerging Teams Asia Cup in Bangladesh. In September 2021, he was named in Oman's squad for the 2021 T20 World Cup. In May 2024, he was named as a reserve player in Oman's squad for the 2024 T20 World Cup tournament.

In December 2025, he was named the skipper of Oman's squad for the 2026 T20 World Cup.
