= 2025 North American Cup =

Inaugural edition of the North American Cup

- Dates: 19 – 27 April 2025
- Administrator: ICC Americas
- Cricket format: Twenty20 International
- Tournament format(s): Round-robin and play-offs
- Host: Cayman Islands
- Champions: United States (1st title)
- Runners-up: Canada
- Participants: 5
- Matches: 13
- Player of the series: (United States) Monank Patel
- Most runs: (United States) Monank Patel (265)
- Most wickets: (United States) Yasir Mohammad (16)

The 2025 North American Cup was the inaugural edition of the North American Cup, a cricket tournament that was contested in the Cayman Islands from 19 to 27 April 2025. The five participating teams were the hosts Cayman Islands, along with Bahamas, Bermuda, Canada and the United States.

The tournament provided the teams with preparations for the 2025 Men's T20 World Cup Americas Regional Final (which did not feature the United States who had already qualified for the 2026 Men's T20 World Cup).

The United States beat Canada in the final by 6 wickets, to become the first champions of the North American Cup.

== Squads ==
Bahamas	Bermuda	Canada	Cayman Islands	United States
Marc Taylor (c); Festus Benn; Renford Davson; Eugene Duff; Sandeep Goud; Kevorn Hinds; Julio Jemison (wk); Ashok Nair; Ricardo Patten; Romaine Smith; Ryan Tappin; Dwight Wheatley	Terryn Fray (c) (Note: Sinclair Smith captained Bermuda in their last round-robin match and semi-final.); Onias Bascome; Derrick Brangman; Zeko Burgess; Alex Dore; Allan Douglas; Kevon Fubler; Jermal Proctor; Delray Rawlins; Dalin Richardson; Jarryd Richardson; Dominic Sabir; Marcus Scotland; Sinclair Smith (wk)	Navneet Dhaliwal (c); Dilpreet Bajwa; Mansab Gill; Akhil Kumar; Shreyas Movva (wk); Ali Nadeem; Saad Bin Zafar; Yuvraj Samra; Kaleem Sana; Shivam Sharma; Jaskaran Singh; Ravinderpal Singh; Sukhjinder Singh; Kanwarpal Tathgur (wk); Harsh Thaker	Conroy Wright (c); Ramon Sealy (vc); Jermaine Baker (wk); Jahmeal Buchanan; Davion Codner; Sacha de Alwis; Romeo Dunka; Romario Edwards; Sam Foster; Alistair Ifill; Karthik Jayaraj; Demar Johnson; Akshay Naidoo; Rickel Walker; Adrian Wright	Monank Patel (c, wk); Jessy Singh (vc); Ayan Desai; Shayan Jahangir (wk); Rahul Jariwala; Aaron Jones; Sanjay Krishnamurthi; Milind Kumar; Yasir Mohammad; Saiteja Mukkamalla; Aarin Nadkarni; Saurabh Netravalkar; Akhilesh Reddy; Ali Sheikh; Vatsal Vaghela

== Round-robin ==
=== Points table ===
Pos	Team	Pld	W	L	T	NR	Pts	NRR
1	Canada	4	4	0	0	0	8	3.291
2	United States	4	3	1	0	0	6	4.399
3	Bermuda	4	2	2	0	0	4	0.052
4	Cayman Islands (H)	4	1	3	0	0	2	−1.550
5	Bahamas	4	0	4	0	0	0	−6.131

Source: ESPNcricinfo
(H) Host

=== Fixtures ===
19 April 2025
10:00
Scorecard

United States; 186/6 (20 overs)	v	Cayman Islands; 107/7 (20 overs)
Monank Patel 76 (45); Conroy Wright 2/28 (4 overs)		Jermaine Baker 30 (20); Yasir Mohammad 4/20 (4 overs)

United States won by 79 runs
Jimmy Powell Oval, George Town
Umpires: Dexter Smith (Ber) and Muhunthan Thetchanamurthy (Can)
Player of the match: Monank Patel (USA)

- United States won the toss and elected to bat.
- Davion Codner, Romario Edwards (Cay) and Akhilesh Reddy (USA) all made their T20I debuts.

19 April 2025
14:30
Scorecard

Bermuda; 105/8 (20 overs)	v	Canada; 108/5 (18.1 overs)
Terryn Fray 52 (54); Kaleem Sana 4/17 (4 overs)		Harsh Thaker 36* (34); Jermal Proctor 1/11 (3 overs)

Canada won by 5 wickets
Jimmy Powell Oval, George Town
Umpires: Livingstone Bailey (Bah) and Aditya Gajjar (USA)
Player of the match: Kaleem Sana (Can)

- Bermuda won the toss and elected to bat.
- Ali Nadeem, Jaskaran Singh and Sukhjinder Singh (Can) all made their T20I debuts.

20 April 2025
10:00
Scorecard

United States; 217/4 (20 overs)	v	Bahamas; 68/9 (20 overs)
Monank Patel 104 (49); Romaine Smith 2/36 (4 overs)		Marc Taylor 19 (21); Vatsal Vaghela 3/12 (4 overs)

United States won by 149 runs
Jimmy Powell Oval, George Town
Umpires: Leon Watson (Cay) and Courtney Young (Cay)
Player of the match: Monank Patel (USA)

- United States won the toss and elected to bat.
- Ryan Tappin, Ricardo Patten (Bah), Rahul Jariwala and Aarin Nadkarni (USA) all made their T20I debuts.
- Monank Patel (USA) scored his first century in T20Is.

20 April 2025
14:30
Scorecard

Bermuda; 137/5 (20 overs)	v	Cayman Islands; 107/8 (20 overs)
Terryn Fray 38 (40); Romario Edwards 2/24 (4 overs)		Jermaine Baker 54 (51); Dominic Sabir 3/14 (3 overs)

Bermuda won by 30 runs
Jimmy Powell Oval, George Town
Umpires: Narendra Ekanayake (Bah) and Muhunthan Thetchanamurthy (Can)
Player of the match: Dominic Sabir (Ber)

- Bermuda won the toss and elected to bat.

21 April 2025
10:00
Scorecard

Bahamas; 41 (16.5 overs)	v	Canada; 46/0 (4 overs)
Antonio Harris 12 (11); Saad Bin Zafar 3/11 (4 overs)		Ali Nadeem 32* (16)

Canada won by 10 wickets
Jimmy Powell Oval, George Town
Umpires: Aditya Gajjar (USA) and Paul Manning (Cay)
Player of the match: Saad Bin Zafar (Can)

- Bahamas won the toss and elected to bat.

21 April 2025
14:30
Scorecard

Bermuda; 70 (16.3 overs)	v	United States; 71/0 (5.4 overs)
Delray Rawlins 18 (21); Ali Sheikh 5/15 (3 overs)		Saiteja Mukkamalla 50* (23)

United States won by 10 wickets
Jimmy Powell Oval, George Town
Umpires: Narendra Ekanayake (Bah) and Muhunthan Thetchanamurthy (Can)
Player of the match: Ali Sheikh (USA)

- Bermuda won the toss and elected to bat.
- Ali Sheikh (USA) took his first five-wicket haul in T20Is.

23 April 2025
10:00
Scorecard

Canada; 165/6 (20 overs)	v	Cayman Islands; 71 (17.1 overs)
Ali Nadeem 89 (58); Adrian Wright 1/24 (4 overs)		Ramon Sealy 17 (18); Shivam Sharma 4/14 (4 overs)

Canada won by 94 runs
Jimmy Powell Oval, George Town
Umpires: Aditya Gajjar (USA) and Dexter Smith (Ber)
Player of the match: Ali Nadeem (Can)

- Cayman Islands won the toss and elected to field.
- Mansab Gill and Shivam Sharma (Can) both made their T20I debuts.

23 April 2025
14:30
Scorecard

Bahamas; 51 (13.3 overs)	v	Bermuda; 55/0 (8.5 overs)
Festus Benn 32* (36); Dominic Sabir 3/8 (2.3 overs)		Alex Dore 33* (27)

Bermuda won by 10 wickets
Jimmy Powell Oval, George Town
Umpires: Paul Manning (Cay) and Leon Watson (Cay)
Player of the match: Dominic Sabir (Ber)

- Bahamas won the toss and elected to bat.
- Dalin Richardson and Marcus Scotland (Ber) both made their T20I debuts.

24 April 2025
10:00
Scorecard

Cayman Islands; 175/2 (20 overs)	v	Bahamas; 96/5 (20 overs)
Jermaine Baker 88* (61); Romaine Smith 2/31 (4 overs)		Sandeep Goud 29* (28); Alistair Ifill 4/8 (4 overs)

Cayman Islands won by 79 runs
Jimmy Powell Oval, George Town
Umpires: Aditya Gajjar (USA) and Dexter Smith (Ber)
Player of the match: Jermaine Baker (Cay)

- Cayman Islands won the toss and elected to bat.
- Karthik Jayaraj (Cay) made his T20I debut.

24 April 2025
14:30
Scorecard

Canada; 184/7 (20 overs)	v	United States; 167/8 (20 overs)
Navneet Dhaliwal 68 (41); Yasir Mohammad 3/39 (4 overs)		Milind Kumar 32 (27); Harsh Thaker 2/8 (2 overs)

Canada won by 17 runs
Jimmy Powell Oval, George Town
Umpires: Leon Watson (Cay) and Courtney Young (Cay)
Player of the match: Navneet Dhaliwal (Can)

- Canada won the toss and elected to bat.

== Play-offs ==
=== Semi-finals ===
26 April 2025
10:00
Scorecard

Cayman Islands; 122/8 (20 overs)	v	Canada; 125/0 (13.3 overs)
Ramon Sealy 47 (43); Kaleem Sana 4/27 (4 overs)		Navneet Dhaliwal 70* (42)

Canada won by 10 wickets
Jimmy Powell Oval, George Town
Umpires: Narendra Ekanayake (Bah) and Dexter Smith (Ber)
Player of the match: Kaleem Sana (Can)

- Cayman Islands won the toss and elected to bat.

26 April 2025
14:30
Scorecard

Bermuda; 114/7 (20 overs)	v	United States; 115/0 (14.2 overs)
Marcus Scotland 57* (57); Milind Kumar 2/6 (2 overs)		Saiteja Mukkamalla 72* (49)

United States won by 10 wickets
Jimmy Powell Oval, George Town
Umpires: Muhunthan Thetchanamurthy (Can) and Leon Watson (Cay)
Player of the match: Saiteja Mukkamalla (USA)

- Bermuda won the toss and elected to bat.

=== Final ===
27 April 2025
10:00
Scorecard

Canada; 168/9 (20 overs)	v	United States; 169/4 (19.1 overs)
Jaskaran Singh 60* (26); Jessy Singh 3/22 (4 overs)		Monank Patel 70 (44); Saad Bin Zafar 2/20 (4 overs)

United States won by 6 wickets
Jimmy Powell Oval, George Town
Umpires: Paul Manning (Cay) and Leon Watson (Cay)
Player of the match: Monank Patel (USA)

- Canada won the toss and elected to bat.

== Statistics ==
Most runs
Runs	Player	Team
265	Monank Patel	United States
207	Jermaine Baker	Cayman Islands
188	Ali Nadeem	Canada
187	Saiteja Mukkamalla	United States
185	Navneet Dhaliwal	Canada

- Source: CricInfo

Most wickets
Wickets	Player	Team
16	Yasir Mohammad	United States
15	Kaleem Sana	Canada
9	Saad Bin Zafar	Canada
9	Jaskaran Singh	Canada
6	Three players	

- Source: CricInfo
