= 2026 North American Cup =

2nd edition of the North American Cup

- Dates: 23 – 27 September 2026
- Administrator: ICC Americas
- Cricket format: Twenty20 International
- Tournament format(s): Double round-robin and play-offs
- Host: Cayman Islands
- Champions: Bermuda (1st title)
- Runners-up: Cayman Islands
- Participants: 3
- Matches: 8
- Player of the series: (Bermuda) Delray Rawlins
- Most runs: (Cayman Islands) Jermaine Baker (140)
- Most wickets: (Bermuda) Delray Rawlins (7) (Bermuda) Kwasi James (7)

The 2026 North American Cup, the second edition of the North American Cup, was a cricket tournament hosted by Cayman Islands from 20 to 27 September 2026. The tournament was being played with Twenty20 International (T20I) status and featured three teams, the hosts Cayman Islands, Bahamas and Bermuda. The first two games were abandoned due to heavy rain and the schedule was subsequently changed with the first match played on 23 September.

Bermuda won the tournament after defeating Cayman Islands in the final by 42 runs.

== Background ==
The tournament was initially scheduled to be played in April 2026, but was later moved to September due to conflicting international fixtures and logistical challenges. In August 2026, the revised schedule was announced with the tournament now set to feature just three teams with the United States and Canada not participating after featuring in the previous edition.

== Squads ==
| Bahamas | Bermuda | Cayman Islands |
|---|---|---|
| Turan Brown (c); Festus Benn; Keith Burrows; Everette Haven; Kervon Hinds; Gregory Irvin; Ricardo Patten; Shawn Fowler; Orville Howell; Mohamed Sarfudeen; Gregory Taylor; Marc Taylor; Damion Wint | Terryn Fray (c); Derrick Brangman (vc); Onias Bascome; Kevon Fubler; Kwasi James; Kamau Leverock; Isaiah O’Brien; Nzari Paynter; Jermal Proctor; Delray Rawlins; Dominic Sabir; Sinclair Smith (wk); Zeri Tomlinson (wk); Charles Trott | Ramon Sealy (c); Jermaine Baker (wk); Vick Dhaniram; Sachin Diwangana; Romeo Dunka; Romario Edwards; Sam Foster; Antwan Ifill; Demar Johnson; Alessandro Morris jnr; Bishal Kharty; Andre McCarthy; Malcolm Ramlogan; Adrian Wright |

== Round-robin ==
=== Points table ===
| Pos | Team | Pld | W | L | T | NR | Pts | NRR | Qualification |
|---|---|---|---|---|---|---|---|---|---|
| 1 | Cayman Islands (H) | 4 | 2 | 1 | 0 | 1 | 5 | 1.980 | Advanced to final |
| 2 | Bermuda | 4 | 1 | 1 | 0 | 2 | 4 | 0.444 | Advanced to qualifier |
| 3 | Bahamas | 4 | 0 | 1 | 0 | 3 | 3 | −6.550 | Advanced to qualifier |

Source: Cricinfo
(H) Host

=== Fixtures ===
23 September 2026
10:00
Scorecard

| Bermuda; 113 (19.2 overs) | v | Cayman Islands; 115/8 (18.3 overs) |
| Kamau Leverock 46 (36); Romeo Dunka 3/27 (3 overs) | | Andre McCarthy 28 (21); Delray Rawlins 4/15 (4 overs) |

Cayman Islands won by 2 wickets
Jimmy Powell Oval, George Town
Umpires: Narendra Ekanayake (Bah) and Zitroy Robertson (Cay)
Player of the match: Andre McCarthy (Cay)

- Bermuda won the toss and elected to bat.
- Sachin Diwangana, Bishal Kharty and Malcolm Ramlogan (Cay) all made their T20I debuts.
- Andre McCarthy played his first T20I for Cayman Islands after having previously played one T20I for West Indies, becoming the 27th cricketer to represent two international teams in men's T20Is.

23 September 2026
14:30
Scorecard

| Cayman Islands; 143/5 (20 overs) | v | Bermuda; 149/0 (16.4 overs) |
| Romeo Dunka 43* (27); Kevon Fubler 2/9 (2 overs) | | Dominic Sabir 73* (55) |

Bermuda won by 10 wickets
Jimmy Powell Oval, George Town
Umpires: Narendra Ekanayake (Bah) and Derrick Williams (Cay)
Player of the match: Delray Rawlins (Ber)

- Cayman Islands won the toss and elected to bat.
- Kwasi James (Ber) made his T20I debut.

24 September 2026
10:00
Scorecard

| Cayman Islands; 215/3 (20 overs) | v | Bahamas; 84 (18.3 overs) |
| Jermaine Baker 106* (60); Shawn Fowler 1/11 (2 overs) | | Marc Taylor 24 (16); Sachin Diwangana 2/4 (2 overs) |

Cayman Islands won by 131 runs
Jimmy Powell Oval, George Town
Umpires: Narendra Ekanayake (Bah) and Omar Willis (Cay)
Player of the match: Jermaine Baker (Cay)

- Bahamas won the toss and elected to field.
- Damion Wint (Bah) made his T20I debut.
- Jermaine Baker (Cay) scored his first century in T20Is.

24 September 2026
14:30
Scorecard

| Bahamas | v | Cayman Islands |

No result
Jimmy Powell Oval, George Town
Umpires: Zitroy Robertson (Cay) and Derrick Williams (Cay)

- Bahamas won the toss and elected to bat.
- No play was possible due to rain.
- Antwan Ifill, Alessandro Morris jnr (Cay) and Mohamed Sarfudeen (Bah) all made their T20I debuts.

25 September 2026
10:00
Scorecard

| Bahamas | v | Bermuda |

Match abandoned
Jimmy Powell Oval, George Town

- No toss.
- No play was possible due to rain.

25 September 2026
14:30
Scorecard

| Bahamas | v | Bermuda |

Match abandoned
Jimmy Powell Oval, George Town

- No toss.
- No play was possible due to rain.

== Knockout stage ==
=== Qualifier ===
26 September 2026
13:30
Scorecard

| Bahamas; 82 (18.5 overs) | v | Bermuda; 83/2 (6.1 overs) |
| Marc Taylor 62 (59); Kwasi James 4/26 (4 overs) | | Delray Rawlins 52 (17); Turan Brown 2/24 (2 overs) |

Bermuda won by 8 wickets
Jimmy Powell Oval, George Town
Umpires: Zitroy Robertson (Cay) and Omar Willis (Cay)
Player of the match: Delray Rawlins (Ber)

- Bahamas won the toss and elected to bat.

=== Final ===
27 September 2026
13:30
Scorecard

| Bermuda; 101/9 (15 overs) | v | Cayman Islands; 59 (15 overs) |
| Isaiah O’Brien 43 (22); Romario Edwards 3/6 (2 overs) | | Vick Dhaniram 14 (11); Kwasi James 3/17 (3 overs) |

Bermuda won by 42 runs
Jimmy Powell Oval, George Town
Umpires: Narendra Ekanayake (Bah) and Omar Willis (Cay)
Player of the match: Isaiah O’Brien (Ber)

- Cayman Islands won the toss and elected to field.
- The match was reduced to 15 overs per side due to rain.
