= International cricket in 2008 =

Cricket season

The International cricket in 2008 is defined as the season of international cricket between April and August 2008 in all cricket playing countries, as well as all international matches scheduled for the 2008 English Cricket Season. Matches between January and April are defined as belonging to the 2007–08 season, while matches between September and December will fall under the 2008–09 season.

== Season overview ==
International tours
Start date	Home team	Away team	Results [Matches]		
Start date	Home team	Away team	Test	ODI	T20I
8 April 2008	Pakistan	Bangladesh	—	5–0 [5]	1–0 [1]
15 May 2008	England	New Zealand	2–0 [3]	1–3 [5]	1–0 [1]
22 May 2008	West Indies	Australia	0–2 [3]	0–5 [5]	1–0 [1]
28 June 2008	Canada	Bermuda	—	1–2 [3]	—
10 July 2008	England	South Africa	1–2 [4]	4–0 [5]	0–0 [1]
23 July 2008	Sri Lanka	India	2–1 [3]	2–3 [5]	—
7 August 2008	Netherlands	Bermuda	—	1–0 [2]	—
12 August 2008	Ireland	Canada	—	0–0 [1]	—
18 August 2008	Scotland	England	—	0–0 [1]	—
24 August 2008	Ireland	Kenya	—	1–0 [3]	—
30 August 2008	Australia	Bangladesh	—	3–0 [3]	—
International tournaments
Start date	Tournament			Winners	
8 June 2008	(Bangladesh) Tri-Series			Pakistan	
24 June 2008	(Pakistan) Asia Cup			Sri Lanka	
1 July 2008	(Scotland) Associates Tri-Series			New Zealand	
18 August 2008	(Canada) Associates Tri-Series			West Indies	
Minor tours
Start date	Home team	Away team	Results [Matches]		
Start date	Home team	Away team	First-class		ODI
7 August 2008	Scotland	Kenya	0–0 [1]		0–0 [2]
Minor tournaments
Start date	Tournament			Winners	
23 May 2008	(Jersey) ICC World Cricket League Division Five			Afghanistan	
2 August 2008	(Republic of Ireland) ICC World Twenty20 Qualifier			Ireland; Netherlands	

== Pre-season rankings ==
ICC Test Championship 13 April 2008
Rank	Team	Matches	Points	Rating
1	Australia	33	4650	141
2	India	42	4242	111
3	South Africa	44	4789	109
4	England	44	4771	108
5	Sri Lanka	35	3709	106
6	Pakistan	33	3107	100
7	New Zealand	25	2277	84
8	West Indies	31	2380	83
9	Bangladesh	24	23	0

ICC ODI Championship 13 April 2008
Rank	Team	Matches	Points	Rating
1	Australia	49	5434	129
2	South Africa	47	5597	127
3	India	72	7230	113
4	New Zealand	38	4312	113
5	Pakistan	36	3943	110
6	England	40	4200	105
7	Sri Lanka	46	4810	105
8	West Indies	39	3880	99
9	Bangladesh	38	1798	47
10	Ireland	11	217	20
11	Zimbabwe	31	552	18
12	Kenya	6	0	0

== April ==
=== Bangladesh in Pakistan ===
No.	Date	Home captain	Away captain	Venue	Result
ODI series
ODI 2696	8 April	Shoaib Malik	Mohammad Ashraful	Gaddafi Stadium, Lahore	Pakistan by 152 runs (D/L)
ODI 2698	11 April	Shoaib Malik	Mohammad Ashraful	Iqbal Stadium, Faisalabad	Pakistan by 7 wickets (D/L)
ODI 2700	13 April	Shoaib Malik	Mohammad Ashraful	Gaddafi Stadium, Lahore	Pakistan by 23 runs
ODI 2702	16 April	Shoaib Malik	Mohammad Ashraful	Multan Cricket Stadium, Multan	Pakistan by 7 wickets
ODI 2703	19 April	Shoaib Malik	Mohammad Ashraful	National Stadium, Karachi	Pakistan by 150 runs
T20I
T20I 55	20 April	Shoaib Malik	Mohammad Ashraful	National Stadium, Karachi	Pakistan by 102 runs

== May ==
=== New Zealand in England ===
No.	Date	Home captain	Away captain	Venue	Result
Test series
Test 1874	15–19 May	Michael Vaughan	Daniel Vettori	Lord's, London	Match drawn
Test 1876	23–27 May	Michael Vaughan	Daniel Vettori	Old Trafford, Manchester	England by 6 wickets
Test 1878	5–9 June	Michael Vaughan	Daniel Vettori	Trent Bridge, Nottingham	England by an innings and 9 runs
T20I
T20I 56	13 June	Paul Collingwood	Daniel Vettori	Old Trafford, Manchester	England by 9 wickets
ODI series
ODI 2708	15 June	Paul Collingwood	Daniel Vettori	Riverside Ground, Chester-le-Street	England by 114 runs
ODI 2709	18 June	Paul Collingwood	Daniel Vettori	Edgbaston, Birmingham	Match abandoned
ODI 2710	21 June	Paul Collingwood	Daniel Vettori	Country Ground, Bristol	New Zealand by 22 runs
ODI 2714	25 June	Paul Collingwood	Daniel Vettori	The Oval, London	New Zealand by 1 wicket
ODI 2720	28 June	Kevin Pietersen	Daniel Vettori	Lord's, London	New Zealand by 51 runs

=== Australia in West Indies ===
No.	Date	Home captain	Away captain	Venue	Result
Test series
Test 1875	22–26 May	Ramnaresh Sarwan	Ricky Ponting	Sabina Park, Kingston, Jamaica	Australia by 95 runs
Test 1877	30 May – 3 June	Ramnaresh Sarwan	Ricky Ponting	Sir Vivian Richards Stadium, North Sound, Antigua	Match drawn
Test 1879	12–16 June	Chris Gayle	Ricky Ponting	Kensington Oval, Bridgetown, Barbados	Australia by 87 runs
T20I
T20I 57	21 June	Dwayne Bravo	Ricky Ponting	Kensington Oval, Bridgetown, Barbados	West Indies by 7 wickets
ODI series
ODI 2713	24 June	Chris Gayle	Ricky Ponting	Arnos Vale Ground, Kingstown, St Vincent	Australia by 84 runs
ODI 2719	27 June	Chris Gayle	Ricky Ponting	National Cricket Stadium, St. George's, Grenada, Grenada	Australia by 63 runs (D/L)
ODI 2724	29 June	Chris Gayle	Ricky Ponting	National Cricket Stadium, St. George's, Grenada, Grenada	Australia by 7 wickets
ODI 2734	4 July	Chris Gayle	Michael Clarke	Warner Park Stadium, Basseterre, St Kitts	Australia by 1 run
ODI 2736	6 July	Chris Gayle	Michael Clarke	Warner Park Stadium, Basseterre, St Kitts	Australia by 169 runs

=== World Cricket League Division 5 ===
The 2008 ICC World Cricket League Division Five took place in May 2008 in Jersey. 12 teams took part in the tournament, including Afghanistan, Bahamas, Botswana, Germany, Japan, Jersey, Mozambique, Nepal, Norway, Singapore, USA, Vanuatu.

==== Group stage ====
Group A
Team	Pld	W	L	T	NR	NRR	Pts
Nepal	5	4	0	0	1	+3.04	9
United States	5	4	0	0	1	+2.10	9
Germany	5	3	2	0	0	−0.67	6
Mozambique	5	1	3	0	1	−2.15	3
Norway	5	1	4	0	0	−0.54	2
Vanuatu	5	0	4	0	1	−3.52	1

Group B
Team	Pld	W	L	T	NR	NRR	Pts
Jersey	5	4	0	0	1	+2.46	9
Afghanistan	5	3	1	0	1	+1.63	7
Singapore	5	3	1	0	1	+0.24	7
Botswana	5	1	3	0	1	−0.75	3
Japan	5	0	3	1	1	−1.35	2
Bahamas	5	0	3	1	1	−2.65	2

Group stage
No.	Date	Group	Team 1	Captain 1	Team 2	Captain 2	Venue	Result
1st Match	23 May	A	United States	Steve Massiah	Mozambique	MS Younis	The Farmers Field, St Martin	United States by 9 wickets
2nd Match	23 May	A	Nepal	BK Das	Germany	Graham Sommer	Les Quennevais No. 1, St Brélade	Nepal by 7 wickets
3rd Match	23 May	A	Norway	Shahid Ahmed	Vanuatu	Patrick Haines	FB Fields, St Clement	Norway by 183 runs
4th Match	23 May	B	Afghanistan	Nowroz Mangal	Japan	Ko Irie	Victoria College Ground, St Helier	Afghanistan by 93 runs
5th Match	23 May	B	Jersey	Mathew Hague	Singapore	CR Kumarage	Grainville Cricket Ground, St Saviour	Jersey by 93 runs
6th Match	23 May	B	Bahamas	Narendra Ekanayake	Botswana	Tshepo Mhozya	Les Quennevais No. 2, St Brélade	Botswana by 70 runs
7th Match	24 May	A	United States	Steve Massiah	Norway	Shahid Ahmed	Victoria College Ground, St Helier	No result
8th Match	24 May	A	Nepal	BK Das	Mozambique	MS Younis	Grainville Cricket Ground, St Saviour	No result
9th Match	24 May	A	Germany	Graham Sommer	Vanuatu	Patrick Haines	The Farmers Field, St Martin	Germany by 6 wickets
10th Match	24 May	B	Afghanistan	Norooz Khan Mangal	Bahamas	N Ekanayake	Les Quennevais No. 1, St Brélade	No result
11th Match	24 May	B	Jersey	Mathew Hague	Japan	Ko Irie	Les Quennevais No. 2, St Brélade	No result
12th Match	24 May	B	Singapore	CR Kumarage	Botswana	Abdul Patel	FB Fields, St Clement	No result
Replay of 7th Match	25 May	A	United States	Steve Massiah	Norway	Shahid Ahmed	The Farmers Field, St Martin	United States by 10 wickets
Replay of 8th Match	25 May	A	Nepal	BK Das	Mozambique	MS Younis	Grainville Cricket Ground, St Saviour	Nepal by 219 runs
Replay of 10th Match	25 May	B	Afghanistan	Norooz Khan Mangal	Bahamas	N Ekanayake	Les Quennevais No. 1, St Brélade	Afghanistan by 5 wickets
Replay of 11th Match	25 May	B	Jersey	Mathew Hague	Japan	Ko Irie	Les Quennevais No. 2, St Brélade	Jersey by 8 wickets
Replay of 12th Match	25 May	B	Singapore	CR Kumarage	Botswana	Abdul Patel	FB Fields, St Clement	Singapore by 3 wickets
13th Match	26 May	A	United States	Steve Massiah	Vanuatu	Patrick Haines	Grainville Cricket Ground, St Saviour	United States by 7 wickets
14th Match	26 May	A	Nepal	BK Das	Norway	Shahid Ahmed	Farmers Cricket Club Ground, St Martin	Nepal by 108 runs
15th Match	26 May	A	Germany	Graham Sommer	Mozambique	MS Younis	Victoria College Ground, St Helier	Germany by 7 wickets
16th Match	26 May	B	Afghanistan	Nowroz Mangal	Botswana	ARM Patel	Les Quennevais No. 2, St Brélade	Afghanistan by 7 wickets
17th Match	26 May	B	Japan	Ko Irie	Singapore	CR Kumarage	Les Quennevais No. 1, St Brélade	Match abandoned
18th Match	26 May	B	Jersey	Mathew Hague	Bahamas	N Ekanayake	FB Fields, St Clement	Jersey by 128 runs
19th Match	27 May	A	United States	Steve Massiah	Germany	Graham Sommer	Grainville Cricket Ground, St Saviour	United States by 6 wickets
20th Match	27 May	A	Nepal	BK Das	Vanuatu	A Mansale	Victoria College Ground, St Helier	Nepal by 137 runs
21st Match	27 May	A	Norway	Shahid Ahmed	Mozambique	MS Younis	Les Quennevais No. 1, St Brélade	Mozambique by 3 wickets
22nd Match	27 May	B	Afghanistan	Nowroz Mangal	Singapore	CR Kumarage	FB Fields, St Clement	Singapore by 69 runs
23rd Match	27 May	B	Bahamas	N Ekanayake	Japan	Ko Irie	Les Quennevais No 2 Ground, St Brélade	Match Tied
24th Match	27 May	B	Jersey	Mathew Hague	Botswana	Tshepo Mhozya	Farmers Cricket Club Ground, St Martin	Jersey by 7 wickets
25th Match*	28 May	A	Germany	Graham Sommer	Norway	Shahid Ahmed	Les Quennevais No 2 Ground, St Brélade	Match abandoned
26th Match*	28 May	A	Mozambique	MS Younis	Vanuatu	A Mansale	FB Fields, St Clement	Match abandoned
27th Match*	28 May	A	Nepal	BK Das	United States	Steve Massiah	Les Quennevais, St Brélade	Match abandoned
28th Match*	28 May	B	Bahamas	N Ekanayake	Singapore	CR Kumarage	Victoria College Ground, St Helier	Match abandoned
29th Match*	28 May	B	Botswana	Tshepo Mhozya	Japan	Ko Irie	Farmers Cricket Club Ground, St Martin	Match abandoned
30th Match*	28 May	B	Jersey	Mathew Hague	Afghanistan	Nowroz Mangal	Grainville Cricket Ground, St Saviour	Match abandoned
Replay of 17th Match	29 May	B	Japan	Ko Irie	Singapore	CR Kumarage	Victoria College Ground, St Helier	Singapore by 52 runs (D/L)
Replay of 25th Match	29 May	A	Germany	Graham Sommer	Norway	Shahid Ahmed	Les Quennevais No 2 Ground, St Brélade	Germany by 6 wickets
Replay of 26th Match	29 May	A	Mozambique	MS Younis	Vanuatu	A Mansale	FB Fields, St Clement	No result
Replay of 27th Match	29 May	A	Nepal	BK Das	United States	Steve Massiah	Farmers Cricket Club Ground, St Martin	No result

*The ICC Event Technical Committee, as per 12.1.6 of the ICC World Cricket League Division 5 Playing Conditions, decided not to replay all of group B's abandoned games. The abandoned match between Japan and Singapore will be played on 29 May to ensure that all teams in Group ` are to be played on 29 May.

==== Playoffs ====
9th Place Playoffs
No.	Date	Team 1	Captain 1	Team 2	Captain 2	Venue	Result
9th Place Semifinal 1	30 May	Norway	Shahid Ahmed	Bahamas	Narendra Ekanayake	Farmers Cricket Club Ground, St Martin	Norway by 52 runs
9th Place Semifinal 2	30 May	Vanuatu	Patrick Haines	Japan	Ko Irie	Victoria College Ground, St Helier	Japan by 99 runs
9th Place Playoff	31 May	Japan	Ko Irie	Norway	Shahid Ahmed	Les Quennevais, St Brélade	Norway by 7 wickets
11th Place Playoff	31 May	Vanuatu	Patrick Haines	Bahamas	Narendra Ekanayake	Les Quennevais No 2 Ground, St Brélade	Bahamas 6 wickets

5th Place Playoffs
No.	Date	Team 1	Captain 1	Team 2	Captain 2	Venue	Result
5th Place Semifinal 1	30 May	Mozambique	Shoaib Younus	Singapore	Chaminda Ruwan Kumarage	Les Quennevais No 2 Ground, St Brélade	Singapore by 54 runs
5th Place Semifinal 2	30 May	Germany	Graham Sommer	Botswana	ARM Patel	Les Quennevais, St Brélade	Botswana by 9 runs
5th Place Playoff	31 May	Singapore	Chaminda Ruwan Kumarage	Botswana	ARM Patel	FB Fields, St Clement	Singapore by 15 runs
7th Place Playoff	31 May	Mozambique	Shoaib Younus	Germany	Graham Sommer	Victoria College Ground, St Helier	Germany by 2 wickets

1st Place Playoffs
No.	Date	Team 1	Captain 1	Team 2	Captain 2	Venue	Result
Semifinal 1	30 May	United States	Steve Massiah	Jersey	Mathew Hague	FB Fields, St Clement	Jersey by 84 runs
Semifinal 2	30 May	Nepal	Bonod Das	Afghanistan	Nowroz Mangal	Grainville Cricket Ground, St Saviour	Afghanistan by 37 runs
Final	31 May	Jersey	Mathew Hague	Afghanistan	Nowroz Mangal	Grainville, St Saviour	Afghanistan by 2 wickets
3rd Place Playoff	31 May	United States	Steve Massiah	Nepal	Binod Das	Farmers Cricket Club Ground, St Martin	Nepal by 96 runs

=== Final Placings ===
Pos	Team	Promotion/Relegation
1st	Afghanistan	Promoted to 2008 Division Four
2nd	Jersey	Promoted to 2008 Division Four
3rd	Nepal	Remain in 2010 Division Five
4th	United States	Remain in 2010 Division Five
5th	Singapore	Relegated to regional competitions
6th	Botswana	Relegated to regional competitions
7th	Germany	Relegated to regional competitions
8th	Mozambique	Relegated to regional competitions
9th	Norway	Relegated to regional competitions
10th	Japan	Relegated to regional competitions
11th	Bahamas	Relegated to regional competitions
12th	Vanuatu	Relegated to regional competitions

== June ==
=== 2008 Kitply Cup ===
Pos	Team	Pld	W	L	T	NR	Pts	NRR
1	India	2	2	0	0	0	10	2.373
2	Pakistan	2	1	1	0	0	5	−0.778
3	Bangladesh	2	0	2	0	0	0	−1.789

Group stage
No.	Date	Team 1	Captain 1	Team 2	Captain 2	Venue	Result
ODI 2704	8 June	Bangladesh	Mohammad Ashraful	Pakistan	Shoaib Malik	Shere Bangla National Stadium, Mirpur	Pakistan by 70 runs
ODI 2705	10 June	Pakistan	Shoaib Malik	India	Mahendra Singh Dhoni	Shere Bangla National Stadium, Mirpur	India by 140 runs
ODI 2706	12 June	Bangladesh	Mohammad Ashraful	India	Mahendra Singh Dhoni	Shere Bangla National Stadium, Mirpur	India by 7 wickets

Final
No.	Date	Team 1	Captain 1	Team 2	Captain 2	Venue	Result
ODI 2707	14 June	India	Mahendra Singh Dhoni	Pakistan	Shoaib Malik	Shere Bangla National Stadium, Mirpur	Pakistan by 25 runs

=== Asia Cup ===
The 2008 Asia Cup took place in June 2008 in Pakistan. Six teams took part in the tournament, including Bangladesh, India, Hong Kong, Pakistan, Sri Lanka and UAE.

==== Group stage ====
Group A
Pos	Team	Pld	W	L	T	NR	Pts	NRR
1	Sri Lanka	2	2	0	0	0	4	2.730
2	Bangladesh	2	1	1	0	0	2	−0.350
3	United Arab Emirates	2	0	2	0	0	0	−2.380

Source: ESPNCricinfo

Group B
Pos	Team	Pld	W	L	T	NR	Pts	NRR
1	India	2	2	0	0	0	4	3.154
2	Pakistan	2	1	1	0	0	2	1.161
3	Hong Kong	2	0	2	0	0	0	−4.110

Source: ESPNCricinfo

Group stage
No.	Date	Group	Team 1	Captain 1	Team 2	Captain 2	Venue	Result
1st Match	24 June	A	Bangladesh	Mohammad Ashraful	United Arab Emirates	Saqib Ali	Gaddafi Stadium, Lahore, Pakistan	Bangladesh by 96 runs
2nd Match	24 June	B	Pakistan	Shoaib Malik	Hong Kong	Tabarak Dar	National Stadium, Karachi, Pakistan	Pakistan by 155 runs
3rd Match	25 June	A	Bangladesh	Mohammad Ashraful	Sri Lanka	Mahela Jayawardene	Gaddafi Stadium, Lahore, Pakistan	Sri Lanka by 131 runs
4th Match	25 June	B	Hong Kong	Tabarak Dar	India	Mahendra Singh Dhoni	National Stadium, Karachi, Pakistan	India by 256 runs
5th Match	26 June	A	Sri Lanka	Mahela Jayawardene	United Arab Emirates	Saqib Ali	Gaddafi Stadium, Lahore, Pakistan	Sri Lanka by 142 runs
6th Match	26 June	B	India	Mahendra Singh Dhoni	Pakistan	Shoaib Malik	National Stadium, Karachi, Pakistan	India by 6 wickets

==== Super Fours ====
Pos	Team	Pld	W	L	T	NR	PCO	Pts	NRR
1	Sri Lanka	3	2	1	0	0	2	6	1.363
2	India	3	2	1	0	0	2	6	0.250
3	Pakistan	3	2	1	0	0	0	4	0.924
4	Bangladesh	3	0	3	0	0	0	0	−2.665

Source: ESPNCricinfo

Super Fours
No.	Date	Team 1	Captain 1	Team 2	Captain 2	Venue	Result
7th Match	28 June	Bangladesh	Mohammad Ashraful	India	Mahendra Singh Dhoni	National Stadium, Karachi, Pakistan	India by 7 wickets
8th Match	29 June	Pakistan	Shoaib Malik	Sri Lanka	Mahela Jayawardene	National Stadium, Karachi, Pakistan	Sri Lanka by 64 runs
9th Match	30 June	Bangladesh	Mohammad Ashraful	Sri Lanka	Mahela Jayawardene	National Stadium, Karachi, Pakistan	Sri Lanka by 158 runs
10th Match	2 July	Pakistan	Misbah-ul-Haq	India	Mahendra Singh Dhoni	National Stadium, Karachi, Pakistan	Pakistan by 8 wickets
11th Match	3 July	India	Mahendra Singh Dhoni	Sri Lanka	Mahela Jayawardene	National Stadium, Karachi, Pakistan	India by 6 wickets
12th Match	4 July	Bangladesh	Mohammad Ashraful	Pakistan	Shoaib Malik	National Stadium, Karachi, Pakistan	Pakistan by 10 wickets

==== Final ====
Final
No.	Date	Team 1	Captain 1	Team 2	Captain 2	Venue	Result
Final	6 July	India	Mahendra Singh Dhoni	Sri Lanka	Mahela Jayawardene	National Stadium, Karachi, Pakistan	Sri Lanka by 100 runs

=== Bermuda in Canada ===
No.	Date	Home captain	Away captain	Venue	Result
ODI series
ODI 2722	28 June	Zubin Surkari	Irving Romaine	Maple Leaf North-West Ground, King City	Bermuda by 3 wickets
ODI 2725	29 June	Qaiser Ali	Irving Romaine	Maple Leaf North-West Ground, King City	Bermuda by 11 runs (D/L)
ODI 2728	1 July	Qaiser Ali	Irving Romaine	Maple Leaf North-West Ground, King City	Canada by 77 runs

== July ==
=== Associates Tri-Series in Scotland ===
Group Stage
Pos	Team	Pld	W	L	T	NR	Pts
1	New Zealand	2	2	0	0	0	4
2	Scotland	2	1	1	0	0	2
3	Ireland	2	0	2	0	0	0

Source: Cricinfo

No.	Date	Team 1	Captain 1	Team 2	Captain 2	Venue	Result
Tri-Series
ODI 2727	1 July	New Zealand	Daniel Vettori	Ireland	Kyle McCallan	Mannofield Park, Aberdeen,	New Zealand by 290 runs
ODI 2729	2 July	Ireland	Kyle McCallan	Scotland	Ryan Watson	Mannofield Park, Aberdeen,	Scotland by 5 wickets
ODI 2731	3 July	New Zealand	Daniel Vettori	Scotland	Ryan Watson	Mannofield Park, Aberdeen,	New Zealand by 8 wickets

=== South Africa in England ===
No.	Date	Home captain	Away captain	Venue	Result
Test series
Test 1880	10–14 July	Michael Vaughan	Graeme Smith	Lord's, London	Match drawn
Test 1881	18–22 July	Michael Vaughan	Graeme Smith	Headingley, Leeds	South Africa by 10 wickets
Test 1883	30 July – 3 August	Michael Vaughan	Graeme Smith	Edgbaston, Birmingham	South Africa by 5 wickets
Test 1885	7–11 August	Kevin Pietersen	Graeme Smith	The Oval, London	England by 6 wickets
Twenty20 International
T20I 68a	20 August	Kevin Pietersen	Graeme Smith	Riverside Ground, Chester-le-Street	Match abandoned
ODI series
ODI 2748	22 August	Kevin Pietersen	Graeme Smith	Headingley, Leeds	England by 20 runs
ODI 2754	26 August	Kevin Pietersen	Graeme Smith	Trent Bridge, Nottingham	England by 10 wickets
ODI 2757	29 August	Kevin Pietersen	Jacques Kallis	The Oval, London	England by 126 runs
ODI 2759	31 August	Kevin Pietersen	Jacques Kallis	Lord's, London	England by 7 wickets (D/L)
ODI 2761	3 September	Kevin Pietersen	Jacques Kallis	Sophia Gardens, Cardiff	No result

=== India in Sri Lanka ===
No.	Date	Home captain	Away captain	Venue	Result
Test series
Test 1882	23–27 July	Mahela Jayawardene	Anil Kumble	Sinhalese Sports Club Ground, Colombo	Sri Lanka by an innings and 239 runs
Test 1884	31 July – 4 August	Mahela Jayawardene	Anil Kumble	Galle International Stadium, Galle	India by 170 runs
Test 1886	8–12 August	Mahela Jayawardene	Anil Kumble	R. Premadasa Stadium, Colombo	Sri Lanka by 8 wickets
ODI series
ODI 2742	18 August	Mahela Jayawardene	Mahendra Singh Dhoni	Rangiri Dambulla International Stadium, Dambulla	Sri Lanka by 8 wickets
ODI 2745	20 August	Mahela Jayawardene	Mahendra Singh Dhoni	Rangiri Dambulla International Stadium, Dambulla	India by 3 wickets
ODI 2750	24 August	Mahela Jayawardene	Mahendra Singh Dhoni	R. Premadasa Stadium, Colombo	India by 33 runs
ODI 2755	26 August	Mahela Jayawardene	Mahendra Singh Dhoni	R. Premadasa Stadium, Colombo	India by 46 runs
ODI 2756	29 August	Mahela Jayawardene	Mahendra Singh Dhoni	R. Premadasa Stadium, Colombo	Sri Lanka by 112 runs

== August ==
=== ICC World Twenty20 Qualifier ===
==== Group stage ====
Group A
Pos	Team	Pld	W	L	T	NR	Pts	NRR	Qualification
1	Ireland	2	2	0	0	0	4	0.205	Semi-finals
2	Scotland	2	1	1	0	0	2	0.313	Semi-finals
3	Bermuda	2	0	2	0	0	0	−0.610	5th Place playoff

Group B
Pos	Team	Pld	W	L	T	NR	Pts	NRR	Qualification
1	Netherlands	2	1	1	0	0	2	0.351	Semi-finals
2	Kenya	2	1	1	0	0	2	−0.126	Semi-finals
3	Canada	2	1	1	0	0	2	−0.185	5th Place playoff

Group stage
No.	Date	Group	Team 1	Captain 1	Team 2	Captain 2	Venue	Result
1st Match	2 August	B	Kenya	Steve Tikolo	Netherlands	Jeroen Smits	Civil Service Cricket Club, Belfast	Netherlands by 19 runs
2nd Match	2 August	A	Ireland	William Porterfield	Scotland	Ryan Watson	Civil Service Cricket Club, Belfast	Ireland by 4 wickets
3rd Match	2 August	B	Canada	Sanjayan Thuraisingam	Netherlands	Jeroen Smits	Civil Service Cricket Club, Belfast	Canada by 4 wickets
4th Match	3 August	A	Bermuda	Irving Romaine	Scotland	Ryan Watson	Civil Service Cricket Club, Belfast	Scotland by 8 wickets
5th Match	3 August	B	Canada	Sanjayan Thuraisingam	Kenya	Steve Tikolo	Civil Service Cricket Club, Belfast	Kenya by 4 wickets
6th Match	3 August	A	Bermuda	Irving Romaine	Ireland	William Porterfield	Civil Service Cricket Club, Belfast	Ireland by 4 runs (D/L)

==== Knockout stage ====
1st Place Playoffs
No.	Date	Team 1	Captain 1	Team 2	Captain 2	Venue	Result
Semifinal 1	4 August	Ireland	William Porterfield	Kenya	Steve Tikolo	Civil Service Cricket Club, Belfast	Ireland by 4 wickets
Semifinal 2	4 August	Scotland	Ryan Watson	Netherlands	Jeroen Smits	Civil Service Cricket Club, Belfast	Netherlands by 5 wickets
3rd Place Final	4 August	Kenya	Steve Tikolo	Scotland	Ryan Watson	Civil Service Cricket Club, Belfast	Scotland by 9 wickets
5th Place Final	5 August	Bermuda	Rodney Trott	Canada	Sanjayan Thuraisingam	Civil Service Cricket Club, Belfast	Canada by 8 wickets
1st Place Final	5 August	Ireland	William Porterfield	Netherlands	Jeroen Smits	Civil Service Cricket Club, Belfast	Match abandoned

=== Bermuda in the Netherlands ===
No.	Date	Home captain	Away captain	Venue	Result
ODI series
ODI 2739a	7 August	Jeroen Smits	Irving Romaine	VRA Ground, Amstelveen	Match abandoned
ODI 2740	8 August	Jeroen Smits	Irving Romaine	VRA Ground, Amstelveen	Netherlands by 6 wickets

=== Kenya in Scotland ===
No.	Date	Home captain	Away captain	Venue	Result
First Class
First Class	7–10 August	Ryan Watson	Steve Tikolo	Titwood, Glasgow	Match abandoned
ODI series
ODI 2741	12 August	Ryan Watson	Steve Tikolo	Cambusdoon New Ground, Ayr	No result
ODI 2741a	13 August	Ryan Watson	Steve Tikolo	Cambusdoon New Ground, Ayr	Match abandoned

=== Canada in Ireland ===
No.	Date	Home captain	Away captain	Venue	Result
ODI
ODI 2740a	12 August	Kyle McCallan	Sanjayan Thuraisingam	Clontarf Cricket Club Ground, Dublin	Match abandoned

=== Kenya in the Netherlands ===
No.	Date	Home captain	Away captain	Venue	Result
First Class
First Class	16–19 August	Peter Borren	Steve Tikolo	VRA Ground, Amstelveen	Kenya won by an innings and 6 runs
ODI series
ODI 2747	21 August	Jeroen Smits	Steve Tikolo	VRA Ground, Amstelveen	Netherlands won by 6 wickets

=== England in Scotland ===
No.	Date	Home captain	Away captain	Venue	Result
ODI
ODI 2743	18 August	Ryan Watson	Kevin Pietersen	Grange Cricket Club Ground, Edinburgh	No result

=== Associates Tri-Series in Canada ===
Pos	Team	Pld	W	L	NR	T	Pts	NRR
1	West Indies	2	2	0	0	0	4	+1.526
2	Canada	2	1	1	0	0	2	−0.240
3	Bermuda	2	0	2	0	0	0	−1.190

Group stage
No.	Date	Team 1	Captain 1	Team 2	Captain 2	Venue	Result
ODI 2744	18 August	Canada	Sunil Dhaniram	Bermuda	Irving Romaine	Maple Leaf North-West Ground, King City	Canada by 25 runs
ODI 2746	20 August	Bermuda	Irving Romaine	West Indies	Ramnaresh Sarwan	Maple Leaf North-West Ground, King City	West Indies by 6 wickets
ODI 2749	22 August	West Indies	Chris Gayle	Canada	Sunil Dhaniram	Maple Leaf North-West Ground, King City	West Indies by 49 runs

Final
No.	Date	Team 1	Captain 1	Team 2	Captain 2	Venue	Result
ODI 2752	24 August	Canada	Sunil Dhaniram	West Indies	Chris Gayle	Maple Leaf North-West Ground, King City	West Indies by 7 wickets

=== Kenya in Ireland ===
No.	Date	Home captain	Away captain	Venue	Result
ODI series
ODI 2751	24 August	William Porterfield	Steve Tikolo	Civil Service Cricket Club, Belfast	Ireland by 33 runs
ODI 2753	25 August	William Porterfield	Steve Tikolo	Civil Service Cricket Club, Belfast	No result
ODI 2755	27 August	William Porterfield	Steve Tikolo	Civil Service Cricket Club, Belfast	Match abandoned

=== New Zealand in Pakistan ===
The New Zealand national cricket team was due to tour Pakistan during the northern summer of 2008. They would have played three One Day Internationals against Pakistan. The tour was cancelled due to the political situation in the country.

=== Bangladesh in Australia ===
No.	Date	Home captain	Away captain	Venue	Result
ODI series
ODI 2758	30 August	Michael Clarke	Mohammad Ashraful	TIO Stadium, Darwin	Australia by 180 runs
ODI 2760	3 September	Michael Clarke	Mohammad Ashraful	TIO Stadium, Darwin	Australia by 8 wickets
ODI 2762	6 September	Michael Clarke	Mohammad Ashraful	TIO Stadium, Darwin	Australia by 73 runs
