= 2022 Desert Cup T20I Series =

International cricket tournament

2022 Desert Cup T20I series
- Dates: 14 – 21 November 2022
- Administrator: Oman Cricket
- Cricket format: Twenty20 International
- Tournament format(s): Double round-robin and final
- Host: Oman
- Champions: Canada
- Runners-up: Oman
- Participants: 4
- Matches: 14
- Player of the series: (Canada) Aaron Johnson
- Most runs: (Canada) Aaron Johnson (402)
- Most wickets: (Canada) Ammar Khalid (12)

The 2022 Desert Cup T20I Series was a Twenty20 International (T20I) cricket tournament that took place in Oman in November 2022. The participating teams were the hosts Oman along with Bahrain, Canada and Saudi Arabia. The tournament was played as a double round-robin, with the top two sides advancing to the final. The T20I tournament was followed by a three-match 50-over series between Oman and Canada, as the Canadians prepared for the final event of the 2019–2022 ICC Cricket World Cup Challenge League in Malaysia in December 2022.

Canada finished top of the round-robin, with five wins from six games. They were joined in the final by Oman after Bahrain lost to Saudi Arabia in the last match. Canada comfortably defeated Oman in the final by 8 wickets, thanks to a century opening partnership in their run chase. Saudi Arabia beat Bahrain in the third-place play-off.

== Squads ==
Bahrain	Canada	Oman	Saudi Arabia
Sarfaraz Ali (c); David Mathias (vc); Abdul Majid; Sohail Ahmed; Ahmer Bin Nisar (wk); Imran Anwar; Sikander Billah; Haider Butt; Rizwan Butt; Danish Jasnaik; Imran Khan; Sachin Kumar; Shahid Mahmood; Muhammad Safdar (wk); Umer Toor (wk); Sathaiya Veerapathiran	Saad Bin Zafar (c); Nikhil Dutta; Jeremy Gordon; Dillon Heyliger; Aaron Johnson; Armaan Kapoor; Ammar Khalid; Shreyas Movva (wk); Salman Nazar; Kaleem Sana; Pargat Singh; Ravinderpal Singh; Matthew Spoors; Harsh Thaker; Srimantha Wijeratne (wk)	Zeeshan Maqsood (c); Jatinder Singh (vc); Fayyaz Butt; Sandeep Goud; Kaleemullah; Ayaan Khan; Bilal Khan; Shoaib Khan; Naseem Khushi (wk); Suraj Kumar (wk); Rafiullah; Sufyan Mehmood; Mohammad Nadeem; Kashyap Prajapati; Samay Shrivastava	Abdul Waheed (c); Ishtiaq Ahmad; Atif-Ur-Rehman; Haseeb Ghafoor (wk); Faisal Khan; Saad Khan; Irshad Mubbashar; Usman Najeeb; Muhammad Saqib; Irfan Sarfaraz; Hisham Sheikh; Kashif Siddique; Imran Yousaf; Zain Ul Abidin

== T20I series ==
=== Round-robin ===
==== Points table ====
Pos	Team	Pld	W	L	NR	Pts	NRR
1	Canada	6	5	1	0	10	0.948
2	Oman	6	3	3	0	6	2.135
3	Bahrain	6	3	3	0	6	−1.044
4	Saudi Arabia	6	1	5	0	2	−2.125

Source: ESPNcricinfo

Advanced to the final
Advanced to the 3rd place play-off

==== Fixtures ====
14 November 2022
16:00 (D/N)
Scorecard

Saudi Arabia; 86/8 (20 overs)	v	Oman; 90/1 (10.1 overs)
Haseeb Ghafoor 34* (28); Bilal Khan 3/20 (4 overs)		Jatinder Singh 50* (28); Muhammad Saqib 1/15 (3 overs)

Oman won by 9 wickets
Oman Cricket Academy Ground Turf 1, Muscat
Umpires: Azad KR (Oma) and Mujahid Surve (Oma)
Player of the match: Bilal Khan (Oma)

- Saudi Arabia won the toss and elected to bat.
- Rafiullah, Samay Shrivastava (Oma), Haseeb Ghafoor, Saad Khan, Muhammad Saqib, Kashif Siddique, Irfan Sarfaraz and Atif-Ur-Rehman (Sau) all made their T20I debuts.

14 November 2022
20:00 (N)
Scorecard

Bahrain; 195/7 (20 overs)	v	Canada; 199/6 (19.2 overs)
Sohail Ahmed 80* (37); Ammar Khalid 3/38 (4 overs)		Aaron Johnson 51 (28); Rizwan Butt 3/29 (4 overs)

Canada won by 4 wickets
Oman Cricket Academy Ground Turf 1, Muscat
Umpires: Rahul Asher (Oma) and Vinod Babu (Oma)
Player of the match: Saad Bin Zafar (Can)

- Canada won the toss and elected to field.
- Sohail Ahmed, Ahmer Bin Nisar, Rizwan Butt (Bhr), Aaron Johnson, Ammar Khalid and Pargat Singh (Can) all made their T20I debuts.

15 November 2022
16:00 (D/N)
Scorecard

Canada; 194/5 (20 overs)	v	Saudi Arabia; 128/8 (20 overs)
Aaron Johnson 84 (52); Muhammad Saqib 2/37 (3 overs)		Haseeb Ghafoor 36 (33); Ravinderpal Singh 2/10 (1 over)

Canada won by 66 runs
Oman Cricket Academy Ground Turf 1, Muscat
Umpires: Harikrishna Pillai (Oma) and Anantha Rajamani (Oma)
Player of the match: Aaron Johnson (Can)

- Saudi Arabia won the toss and elected to field.
- Armaan Kapoor (Can), Irshad Mubbashar and Usman Najeeb (Sau) all made their T20I debuts.

15 November 2022
20:00 (N)
Scorecard

Oman; 134/8 (20 overs)	v	Bahrain; 139/4 (19.3 overs)
Rafiullah 27 (14); Imran Khan 4/16 (4 overs)		Sohail Ahmed 55* (39); Rafiullah 4/25 (4 overs)

Bahrain won by 6 wickets
Oman Cricket Academy Ground Turf 1, Muscat
Umpires: Rahul Asher (Oma) and Mujahid Surve (Oma)
Player of the match: Sohail Ahmed (Bhr)

- Bahrain won the toss and elected to field.
- Danish Jasnaik (Bhr) made his T20I debut.

16 November 2022
16:00 (D/N)
Scorecard

Bahrain; 170/4 (20 overs)	v	Saudi Arabia; 117/8 (20 overs)
Sohail Ahmed 78* (57); Imran Yousaf 2/41 (4 overs)		Kashif Siddique 27 (30); Rizwan Butt 2/13 (4 overs)

Bahrain won by 53 runs
Oman Cricket Academy Ground Turf 1, Muscat
Umpires: Anantha Rajamani (Oma) and Mujahid Surve (Oma)
Player of the match: Sohail Ahmed (Bhr)

- Saudi Arabia won the toss and elected to field.

16 November 2022
20:00 (N)
Scorecard

Canada; 191/2 (20 overs)	v	Oman; 190/6 (20 overs)
Aaron Johnson 109* (69); Zeeshan Maqsood 1/10 (4 overs)		Mohammad Nadeem 77* (41); Ammar Khalid 2/22 (4 overs)

Canada won by 1 run
Oman Cricket Academy Ground Turf 1, Muscat
Umpires: Rahul Asher (Oma) and Vinod Babu (Oma)
Player of the match: Aaron Johnson (Can)

- Oman won the toss and elected to field.
- Aaron Johnson (Can) scored his first century in T20Is.

17 November 2022
16:00 (D/N)
Scorecard

Saudi Arabia; 114/8 (20 overs)	v	Oman; 118/3 (12.4 overs)
Kashif Siddique 28 (26); Zeeshan Maqsood 2/10 (4 overs)		Shoaib Khan 36* (27); Muhammad Saqib 2/17 (2.4 overs)

Oman won by 7 wickets
Oman Cricket Academy Ground Turf 1, Muscat
Umpires: Vinod Babu (Oma) and Azad KR (Oma)
Player of the match: Zeeshan Maqsood (Oma)

- Oman won the toss and elected to field.

17 November 2022
20:00 (N)
Scorecard

Canada; 160/6 (20 overs)	v	Bahrain; 164/2 (19.1 overs)
Pargat Singh 61* (51); Rizwan Butt 3/25 (4 overs)		David Mathias 59* (57); Nikhil Dutta 1/25 (4 overs)

Bahrain won by 8 wickets
Oman Cricket Academy Ground Turf 1, Muscat
Umpires: Harikrishna Pillai (Oma) and Mujahid Surve (Oma)
Player of the match: Sarfaraz Ali (Bhr)

- Bahrain won the toss and elected to field.

19 November 2022
16:00 (D/N)
Scorecard

Canada; 171/6 (20 overs)	v	Saudi Arabia; 126/8 (20 overs)
Matthew Spoors 44 (44); Usman Najeeb 3/22 (4 overs)		Saad Khan 29 (21); Ammar Khalid 4/17 (3 overs)

Canada won by 45 runs
Oman Cricket Academy Ground Turf 1, Muscat
Umpires: Azad KR (Oma) and Anantha Rajamani (Oma)
Player of the match: Ammar Khalid (Can)

- Saudi Arabia won the toss and elected to field.

19 November 2022
20:00 (N)
Scorecard

Oman; 220/5 (20 overs)	v	Bahrain; 114 (16 overs)
Zeeshan Maqsood 102* (44); Sathaiya Veerapathiran 3/43 (4 overs)		David Mathias 39 (32); Samay Shrivastava 5/18 (4 overs)

Oman won by 106 runs
Oman Cricket Academy Ground Turf 1, Muscat
Umpires: Rahul Asher (Oma) and Harikrishna Pillai (Oma)
Player of the match: Zeeshan Maqsood (Oma)

- Bahrain won the toss and elected to field.

20 November 2022
16:00 (D/N)
Scorecard

Oman; 169/7 (20 overs)	v	Canada; 170/7 (19.5 overs)
Zeeshan Maqsood 54 (35); Ammar Khalid 3/22 (4 overs)		Aaron Johnson 89 (41); Kaleemullah 3/23 (3.5 overs)

Canada won by 3 wickets
Oman Cricket Academy Ground Turf 1, Muscat
Umpires: Azad KR (Oma) and Vinod Babu (Oma)
Player of the match: Aaron Johnson (Can)

- Canada won the toss and elected to field.

20 November 2022
20:00 (N)
Scorecard

Bahrain; 112/9 (20 overs)	v	Saudi Arabia; 115/1 (10.5 overs)
Haider Butt 41 (43); Atif-Ur-Rehman 3/19 (4 overs)		Faisal Khan 81* (32); Sathaiya Veerapathiran 1/31 (3.5 overs)

Saudi Arabia won by 9 wickets
Oman Cricket Academy Ground Turf 1, Muscat
Umpires: Harikrishna Pillai (Oma) and Anantha Rajamani (Oma)
Player of the match: Faisal Khan (Sau)

- Bahrain won the toss and elected to bat.

=== 3rd place play-off ===
21 November 2022
16:00 (D/N)
Scorecard

Saudi Arabia; 155/8 (20 overs)	v	Bahrain; 123/5 (20 overs)
Saad Khan 69 (54); Imran Anwar 4/24 (4 overs)		Ahmer Bin Nisar 55* (39); Hisham Sheikh 2/26 (4 overs)

Saudi Arabia won by 32 runs
Oman Cricket Academy Ground Turf 1, Muscat
Umpires: Azad KR (Oma) and Vinod Babu (Oma)
Player of the match: Saad Khan (Sau)

- Bahrain won the toss and elected to field.

=== Final ===
21 November 2022
20:00 (N)
Scorecard

Oman; 137 (20 overs)	v	Canada; 139/2 (14 overs)
Naseem Khushi 47* (23); Jeremy Gordon 3/36 (4 overs)		Aaron Johnson 68 (41); Bilal Khan 1/21 (3 overs)

Canada won by 8 wickets
Oman Cricket Academy Ground Turf 1, Muscat
Umpires: Rahul Asher (Oma) and Harikrishna Pillai (Oma)
Player of the match: Jeremy Gordon (Can)

- Canada won the toss and elected to field.

== 50-over series ==
=== 1st 50-over match ===
23 November 2022
09:30
Scorecard

Canada; 229/9 (50 overs)	v	Oman; 145 (40.2 overs)
Harsh Thaker 75 (94); Bilal Khan 3/46 (10 overs)		Sandeep Goud 31 (49); Nikhil Dutta 4/12 (5.2 overs)

Canada won by 84 runs
Oman Cricket Academy Ground Turf 1, Muscat
Umpires: Anantha Rajamani (Oma) and Mujahid Surve (Oma)
Player of the match: Nikhil Dutta (Can)

- Oman won the toss and elected to field.

=== 2nd 50-over match ===
25 November 2022
09:30
Scorecard

Canada; 97 (37 overs)	v	Oman; 101/2 (23.4 overs)
Harsh Thaker 22 (31); Ayaan Khan 2/4 (2 overs)		Jatinder Singh 46 (68); Ravinderpal Singh 1/12 (3 overs)

Oman won by 8 wickets
Oman Cricket Academy Ground Turf 1, Muscat
Umpires: Rahul Asher (Oma) and Vinod Babu (Oma)
Player of the match: Nestor Dhamba (Oma)

- Oman won the toss and elected to field.

=== 3rd 50-over match ===
26 November 2022
09:30
Scorecard

Oman; 166 (49 overs)	v	Canada; 167/1 (23 overs)
Ayaan Khan 28 (53); Saad Bin Zafar 4/28 (10 overs)		Pargat Singh 87* (69); Wasim Ali 1/44 (7 overs)

Canada won by 9 wickets
Oman Cricket Academy Ground Turf 1, Muscat
Umpires: Azad KR (Oma) and Harikrishna Pillai (Oma)
Player of the match: Pargat Singh (Can)

- Canada won the toss and elected to field.
