= North American Cup =

International cricket tournament in North America

- Administrator: ICC Americas
- Format: Twenty20 International
- First edition: 2025 Cayman Islands
- Latest edition: 2026 Cayman Islands
- Next edition: 2027 Bermuda
- Number of teams: 5
- Current champion: Bermuda (1st title)
- Most successful: Bermuda; United States (1 title each)

The North American Cup is an international limited-overs cricket tournament featuring national teams in North America. The inaugural edition was played in the Cayman Islands in April 2025 and involved five teams.

The first edition was won by the United States, who defeated Canada in the final by 6 wickets. Bermuda won the second edition, defeating Cayman Islands in the final by 42 runs.

== Tournament results ==
Year	Host(s)	Venue(s)	Final		
Year	Host(s)	Venue(s)	Winner	Margin	Runner-up
2025	Cayman Islands	Jimmy Powell Oval	United States	United States won by 6 wickets (scorecard)	Canada
2026	Cayman Islands	Jimmy Powell Oval	Bermuda	Bermuda won by 42 runs (scorecard)	Cayman Islands
2027	Bermuda	TBD			
2028	Bermuda	TBD			

== History ==
Legend

- C – Champions
- RU – Runners-up
- SF - Semifinals
- 3rd - 3rd place
- GS – Group stage
- Q – Qualified
- × – Did not participate
- — Hosts

Teams	(Cayman Islands) 2025	(Cayman Islands) 2026	(Bermuda) 2027	(Bermuda) 2028
Bahamas	GS	3rd		
Bermuda	SF	C	Q	Q
Canada	RU	×		
Cayman Islands	SF	RU		
United States	C	×		
