= International cricket in 1897 =

International cricket season

The 1897 international cricket season was from April 1897 to September 1897. Only a few first-class matches were held during the season, with no international tours taking place.

== Season overview ==
International tours
Start date	Home team	Away team	Results [Matches]			
Start date	Home team	Away team	Test	ODI	FC	LA
1 July 1897	Hampshire	Philadelphia	—	—	1–0 [1]	—
6 September 1897	Netherlands	Yorkshire	—	—	1–2 [3]	—
6 September 1897	Canada	United States	—	—	1–0 [1]	—
