= John Dornan =

John Dornan may refer to:

- John Dornan (cricketer)
- John Dornan (politician)
