= Christie Morris =

American cricketer

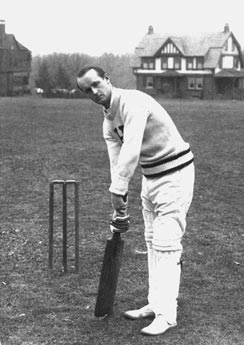
- Morris, circa 1900

Personal information
- Full name: Charles Christopher Morris
- Born: June 30, 1882
- Died: June 17, 1971 (aged 88)
- Batting: Right-handed
- Bowling: Leg-break and googly

Career statistics
Competition	First-class
Matches	36
Runs scored	1,253
Batting average	20.54
100s/50s	1/4
Top score	164
Catches/stumpings	22/0
- Source: CricketArchive, April 15, 2021

Charles Christopher "Christie" Morris (June 30, 1882 – June 17, 1971) was an American cricketer during the sport's brief North American "golden age". He was a right-handed batsman and a leg-break bowler.

== Early cricket ==
The first known time he played cricket was in 1896 for his school team. By 1899 he was gaining wide recognition for his talents, and played for a Philadelphia Colts team against the touring K S Ranjitsinhji's XI, although he met without success, scoring 1 and 0. In the summer of 1900, he played for the Haverford College cricket team on a tour of England before he'd even begun to attend classes. The following year, he first played for the USA national team in their match against Canada. He played for the USA five times in all.

== First-class cricket ==
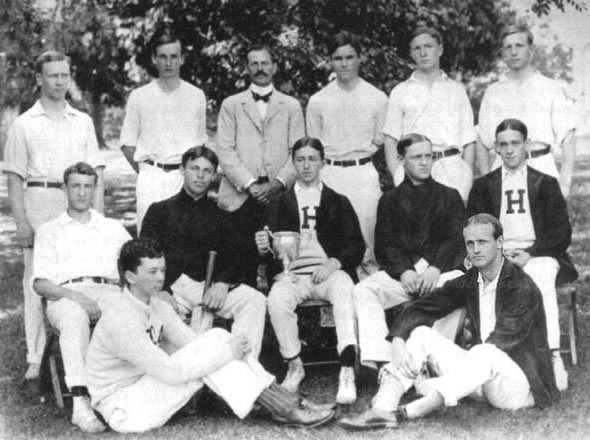
The Haverford College cricket team. Christie Morris is shown at the far right of the front row.

He was first selected for the Philadelphian cricket team in their home two match series against BJT Bosanquet's XI in 1901. He went on to play 36 first-class matches, all but one for Philadelphia. He toured England with the Philadelphians on two occasions, in 1903 and 1908. On the 1903 tour, he scored 164 against Nottinghamshire, his only first-class century. His final first class match was for a combined Canada/USA team against Australia in 1913.

== Later life ==
Morris was still playing regular cricket in 1933, and played for the Haverford alumni as late as 1951 when he was 69 years old. Christie Morris kept cricket alive in the 1930s in America. His close relationship with Norman Seagram, President of the Toronto Cricket Club encouraged tours between Canada and Haverford as well as Bermuda where Seagram had a summer home. In 1937 he worked with K.A. Auty of Chicago in organizing a Gymkhana of American sides that helped maintain the profile of the game in the United States. His alma mater Harverford College has a library named for him which features the largest collection of cricket literature and memorabilia in the western hemisphere. He died at home in June 1971 aged 88.
