= Harold Furness =

American cricketer

Personal information
- Full name: Harold Alan Furness
- Born: May 11, 1887; Pittsfield, Maine, U.S.
- Died: 27 October 1975 (aged 88); Haddonfield, New Jersey, U.S.

International information
- National side: United States

Domestic team information
- Years: Team
- 1912–1913: Gentlemen of Philadelphia

Career statistics
Competition	First-class
Matches	7
Runs scored	251
Batting average	20.91
100s/50s	1/–
Top score	106*
Balls bowled	60
Wickets	–
Bowling average	–
5 wickets in innings	–
10 wickets in match	–
Best bowling	–
Catches/stumpings	1/–
- Source: CricketArchive, January 22, 2011

Harold Alan Furness (May 11, 1887 – 27 October 1975) was an American cricketer. He played seven first-class matches between 1912 and 1913. Five of these were for the Philadelphia and the other two were for a combined Canada/USA team. All were played against Australia. He had a highest score of 106 not out in those seven games, his only first-class century.
