= Pittsfield, Maine =

- Town
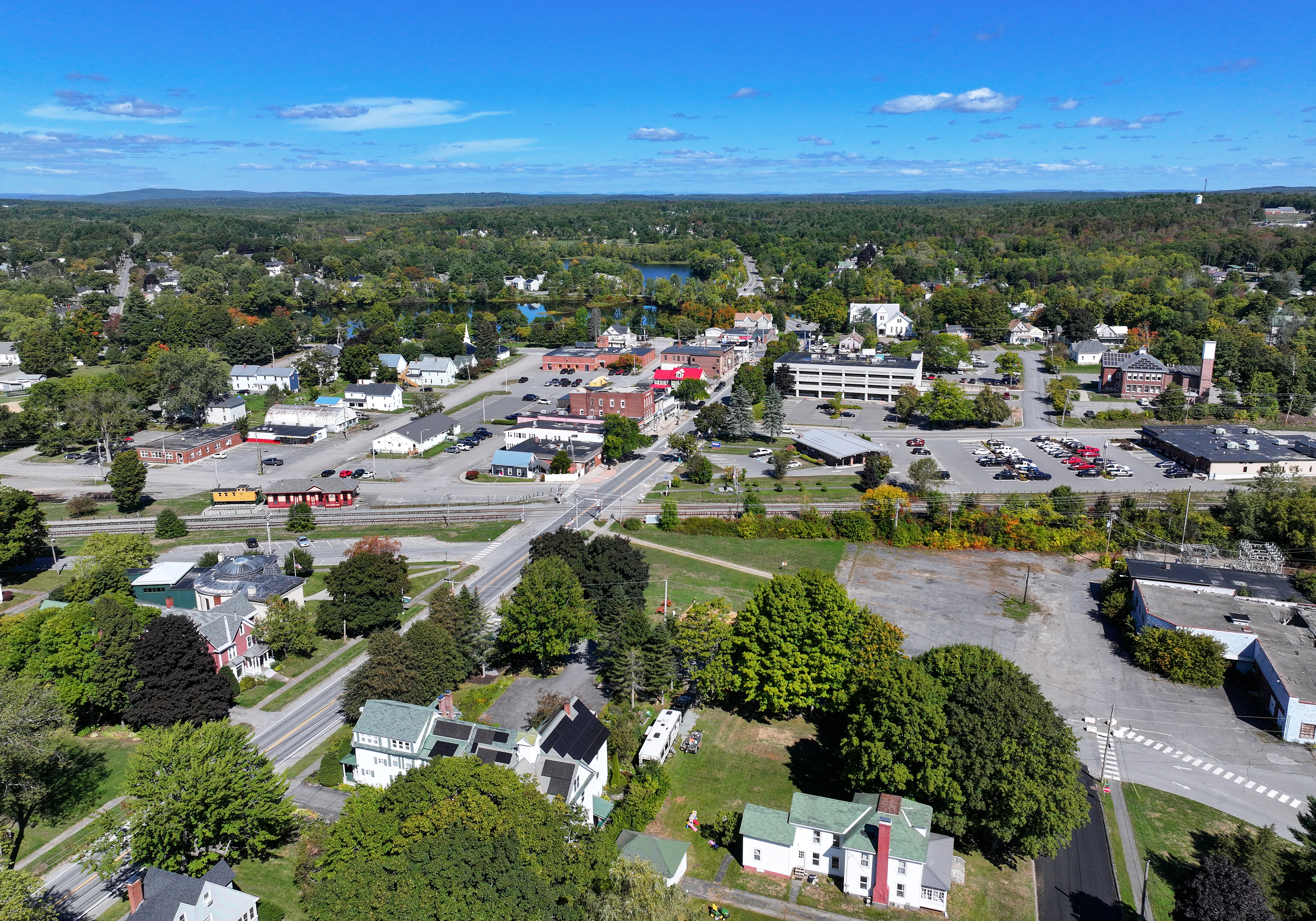
- Downtown Pittsfield

- Logo
- Motto: "A Good Place to Call Home"
- Interactive map of Pittsfield, Maine
- Coordinates: 44°44′58″N 69°26′20″W
- Country: United States
- State: Maine
- County: Somerset

Area
  - Total: 48.72 sq mi (126.18 km^{2})
  - Land: 48.18 sq mi (124.79 km^{2})
  - Water: 0.54 sq mi (1.40 km^{2})
- Elevation: 341 ft (104 m)

Population (2020)
  - Total: 3,908
  - Density: 81/sq mi (31.3/km^{2})
- Time zone: UTC-5 (Eastern (EST))
  - Summer (DST): UTC-4 (EDT)
- ZIP Code: 04967
- GNIS feature ID: 582676
- Website: www.pittsfieldmaine.gov

Pittsfield is a town in Somerset County, Maine, United States. The population was 3,908 at the 2020 census. It contains the census-designated place of the same name. Pittsfield is home to the Maine Central Institute, a semi-private boarding school, and the annual Central Maine Egg Festival.

== History ==
The area was part of the Kennebec Purchase. First called Plymouth Gore, it was settled in 1794 by Moses Martin and his family from Norridgewock. In 1815, the town was organized as the Plantation of Sebasticook, but was incorporated on June 18, 1819, as Warsaw after Warsaw, Poland. In 1824, the name was changed to Pittsfield after William Pitts of Boston, a large landowner after Maine's independence as there was a Pittsfield incorporated already in Massachusetts.

Pittsfield was noted for fine orchards, and became an agricultural trade center. Water power from the Sebasticook River attracted industry, and a gristmill and sawmill were built at the falls. Blacksmith shops and a carriage shop were established. In 1855, the Penobscot and Kennebec Railroad arrived, and Pittsfield developed into a small mill town. In 1869, the first woolen mill was established. The Riverside Woolen Company was the first mill in the state to sell cloth direct from loom to wearer. Fire destroyed the downtown in 1881, but it was soon rebuilt. Woodworking plants and a canning factory were established. The Waverly Woolen Mill was built in 1891–1892, together with 52 dwellings the company rented to workers. Pittsfield was also home to the Sebasticook and the Pioneer woolen mills.

In 1914, the Waverly and the Pioneer mills were sold to the American Woolen Company, which would close in 1934 during the Great Depression. The Pioneer Mill, the largest, remained in operation until after World War II, but as the New England textile business moved to Southern states. The Waverly mill was converted into a shoe factory in the 1940s, with the Pioneer mill converted to manufacture doorbells in the 1950s. Pittsfield was mentioned in the movie Dreamcatcher by Stephen King.

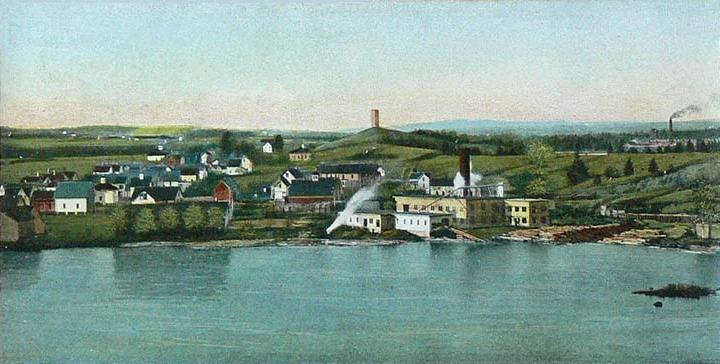
View of Pittsfield in 1905

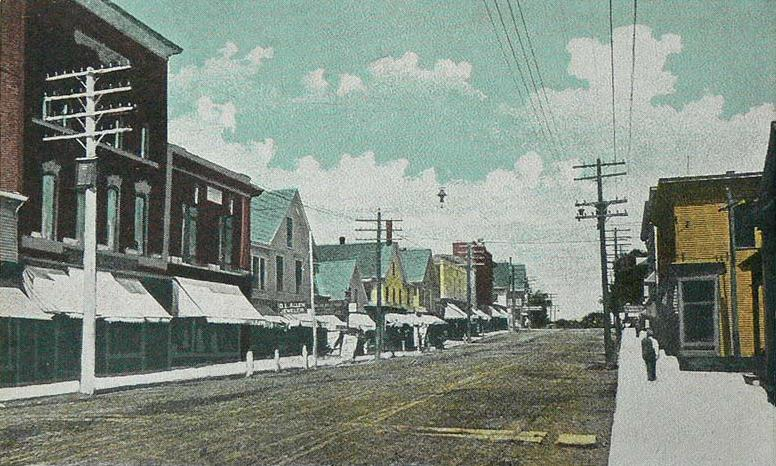
Perkin's and Vickery blocks c. 1908

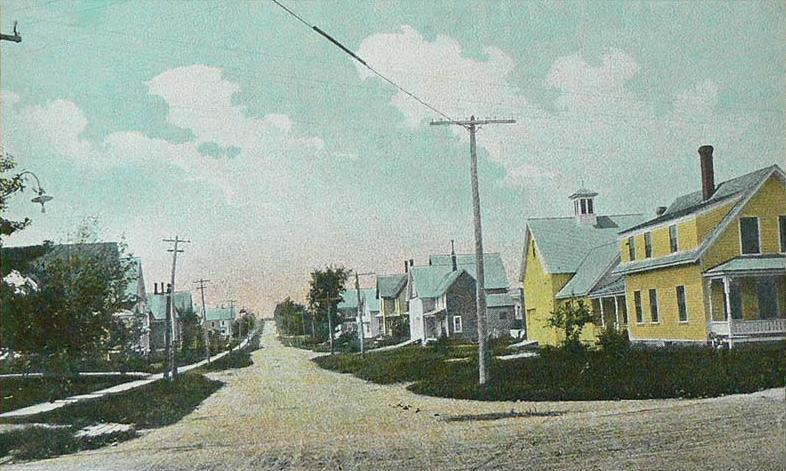
Somerset Avenue c. 1908

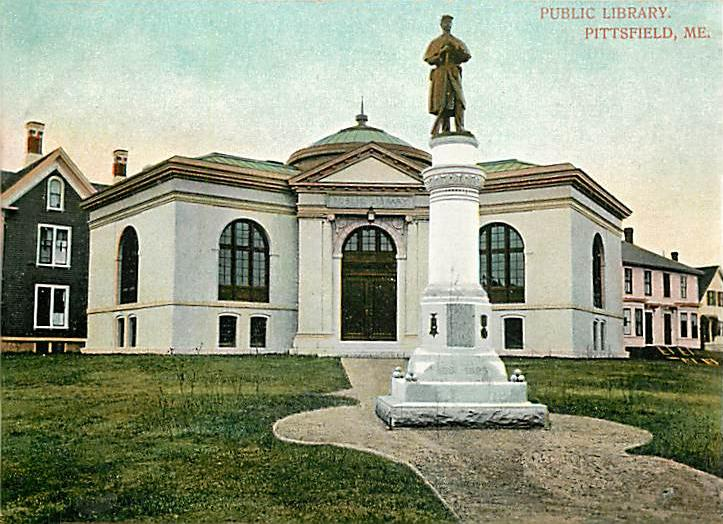
Public Library in 1906, a Carnegie library

== Geography ==
According to the United States Census Bureau, the town has a total area of 48.72 square miles (126.18 km^{2}), of which 48.18 square miles (124.79 km^{2}) is land and 0.54 square miles (1.40 km^{2}) is water. Pittsfield is drained by the Sebasticook River. The town is located at approximately latitude 44° 46' 57" North; longitude 69° 23' 2" West.

== Demographics ==
Historical population
Census	Pop.	Note	%±
1820	315		—
1830	610		93.7%
1840	951		55.9%
1850	1,166		22.6%
1860	1,495		28.2%
1870	1,813		21.3%
1880	1,909		5.3%
1890	2,503		31.1%
1900	2,891		15.5%
1910	2,891		0.0%
1920	2,700		−6.6%
1930	2,935		8.7%
1940	3,329		13.4%
1950	3,909		17.4%
1960	4,010		2.6%
1970	4,274		6.6%
1980	4,125		−3.5%
1990	4,190		1.6%
2000	4,214		0.6%
2010	4,215		0.0%
2020	3,908		−7.3%
U.S. Decennial Census

=== 2010 census ===
As of the census of 2010, there were 4,215 people, 1,639 households, and 1,095 families living in the town. The population density was 87.5 inhabitants per square mile (33.8/km^{2}). There were 1,828 housing units at an average density of 37.9 per square mile (14.6/km^{2}). The racial makeup of the town was 94.4% White, 0.7% African American, 0.2% Native American, 2.6% Asian, 0.1% Pacific Islander, 0.3% from other races, and 1.8% from two or more races. Hispanic or Latino of any race were 2.3% of the population.

There were 1,639 households, of which 32.1% had children under the age of 18 living with them, 48.9% were married couples living together, 12.4% had a female householder with no husband present, 5.6% had a male householder with no wife present, and 33.2% were non-families. 26.1% of all households were made up of individuals, and 11.5% had someone living alone who was 65 years of age or older. The average household size was 2.45 and the average family size was 2.92.

The median age in the town was 40.2 years. 24.2% of residents were under the age of 18; 9.1% were between the ages of 18 and 24; 23.8% were from 25 to 44; 28.1% were from 45 to 64; and 14.9% were 65 years of age or older. The gender makeup of the town was 48.0% male and 52.0% female.

=== 2000 census ===
As of the 2000 United States census, there were 4,214 people, 1,627 households, and 1,147 families living in the town. The population density was 87.5 inhabitants per square mile (33.8/km^{2}). There were 1,808 housing units at an average density of 37.5 per square mile (14.5/km^{2}). The racial makeup of the town was 96.27% White, 0.88% Black or African American, 0.40% Native American, 1.09% Asian, 0.12% Pacific Islander, 0.09% from other races, and 1.14% from two or more races. Hispanic or Latino of any race were 0.69% of the population.

There were 1,627 households, out of which 36.8% had children under the age of 18 living with them, 53.6% were married couples living together, 13.2% had a female householder with no husband present, and 29.5% were non-families. 24.3% of all households were made up of individuals, and 11.2% had someone living alone who was 65 years of age or older. The average household size was 2.50 and the average family size was 2.96.

In the town, the population was spread out, with 27.9% under the age of 18, 7.7% from 18 to 24, 28.6% from 25 to 44, 22.1% from 45 to 64, and 13.8% who were 65 years of age or older. The median age was 36 years. For every 100 females, there were 92.9 males. For every 100 females age 18 and over, there were 88.2 males.

The median income for a household in the town was $32,868, and the median income for a family was $40,612. Males had a median income of $31,673 versus $22,283 for females. The per capita income for the town was $16,065. About 10.0% of families and 12.6% of the population were below the poverty line, including 17.0% of those under age 18 and 7.6% of those age 65 or over.

== Notable people ==
- Harold Furness, cricketer
- Nathaniel Mervin Haskell, 62nd governor of Maine
- Mary Mayhew, lobbyist and politician
- Arthur Millett, silent movie actor
- Carl Milliken, 51st governor of Maine
- Llewellyn Powers, 44th governor of Maine
