= Aaron Johnson (cricketer) =

Jamaican-Canadian cricketer (born 1991)

Personal information
- Full name: Aaron Orlando Johnson
- Born: 16 March 1991 (age 35); Saint Catherine, Jamaica
- Batting: Right-handed
- Bowling: Right-arm off-spin
- Role: Batter

International information
- National side: Canada (2022–present)
- ODI debut (cap 86): 27 March 2023 v Jersey
- Last ODI: 26 September 2024 v Oman
- T20I debut (cap 63): 14 November 2022 v Bahrain
- Last T20I: 18 June 2025 v Bahamas
- T20I shirt no.: 45

Career statistics
Competition	ODI	T20I
Matches	20	31
Runs scored	442	910
Batting average	22.10	32.50
100s/50s	0/3	2/6
Top score	65	121*
Catches/stumpings	10/–	9/–
- Source: Cricinfo, 7 August 2025

Aaron Orlando Johnson is a former Jamaican-born cricketer who represented the Canada national cricket team. He made his international debut for Canada in 2022. He is a right-handed batsman.

== Early life and education ==
Johnson was born in Saint Catherine, Jamaica. He was educated at St. Catherine High School in Spanish Town. His family moved to Canada when he was in his late teens, settling in Fort McMurray, Alberta. Later, he attended Keyano College on a scholarship.

== Domestic and franchise career ==
Aaron Jones played for two seasons at Shepherds Bush Cricket Club, in the Middlesex League. Johnson represented British Columbia at the 2022 national twenty20 championships. For the 2023 Global T20 Canada tournament he was selected to play for the Brampton Wolves.

== International career ==
Aaron Johnson made his international debut for Canada in a 50-over series against Nepal in July 2022. He made his Twenty20 International debut against Bahrain in the 2022 Desert Cup T20I Series in Oman. Two matches later he recorded his maiden T20I century, scoring 109 not out from 69 balls against Oman. This also set a new record for the highest score by a Canadian batsman in T20I cricket.

On 27 March 2023, Johnson made his One Day International (ODI) debut against Jersey at the 2023 Cricket World Cup Qualifier in Zimbabwe.

On 3 October 2023, Canada played Panama in the T20 World Cup Americas Region Final. Johnson hit a destructive 121* (not out) for 59 balls, at a strike rate of 205.08, and with 6 4s and 11 6s. He was the Player of the Match as Canada won by 163 runs.

In May 2024, he was named in Canada's squad for the 2024 T20 World Cup tournament. In the 2024 World Cup, he made 23 runs off 16 balls the opener against the USA. He made14 runs off 13 balls against Ireland. He made an impressive 52 off 44 balls against Pakistan, high scoring for his team.

In September 2025, Johnson announced his retirement from international cricket. He played his last T20I against Cayman Islands in June 2025 and his last ODI against Oman in September 2024.
