= Willard Graham =

American cricketer (1881–1958)

Personal information
- Born: September 5, 1881; Philadelphia, Pennsylvania, U.S.
- Died: February 10, 1958 (aged 76–77); Laverock, Pennsylvania, U.S.
- Batting: Left-handed
- Bowling: Slow left-arm orthodox
- Relatives: Charles Mervyn Graham (brother)

Domestic team information
- Years: Team
- 1901–1913: Gentlemen of Philadelphia

Career statistics
Competition	First-class
Matches	7
Runs scored	108
Batting average	12.00
100s/50s	0/0
Top score	45
Balls bowled	336
Wickets	5
Bowling average	36.80
5 wickets in innings	0
10 wickets in match	0
Best bowling	4/82
Catches/stumpings	0/–
- Source: CricketArchive, January 23, 2011

Willard Graham (September 5, 1881 - February 10, 1958) was an American cricketer. He was a left-handed batsman and a left-arm spin bowler. He played seven first-class matches between 1901 and 1913. Six of these were for the Philadelphian cricket team, the other for a combined Canada/USA team against Australia in 1913, which was his final first-class match.
