= Henry Humphries =

Canadian cricketer

Personal information
- Full name: Henry Hurl Humphries
- Born: 8 September 1879; Warkworth, Ontario, Canada
- Died: 12 October 1964 (aged 85); Bath, Somerset, England
- Batting: Left-handed

Domestic team information
- Years: Team
- 1906: Somerset
- 1913: Canada and United States of America

Career statistics
Competition	First-class
Matches	2
Runs scored	56
Batting average	18.66
100s/50s	–/–
Top score	49
Balls bowled	48
Wickets	–
Bowling average	–
5 wickets in innings	–
10 wickets in match	–
Best bowling	–
Catches/stumpings	–/–
- Source: CricketArchive, 14 October 2011

Henry Hurl Humphries (8 September 1879 – 12 October 1964) was a Canadian cricketer.

He was a left-handed batsman who played one first-class match for Somerset against Sussex as part of the 1906 County Championship. He failed to score, bowl or take a catch in that match.

He later played a second first-class match for a combined Canada/USA team against Australia in Toronto in 1913, top-scoring in the first innings with 49 and bowling eight overs for 32 runs.
