= William Newhall =

American cricketer (1883–1950)

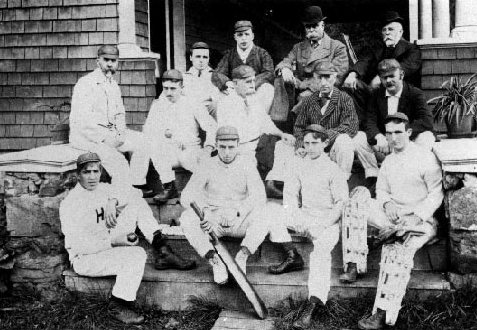
- An eleven member cricket team made up entirely of Newhall family members. William Newhall is in the front row holding the bat.

Personal information
- Full name: William Price Newhall
- Born: January 30, 1883; Philadelphia, Pennsylvania, U.S.
- Died: January 3, 1950 (aged 66); Mount Airy, Pennsylvania, U.S.
- Relatives: George Newhall (uncle); Charles Newhall (uncle); Daniel Newhall (uncle); Robert Newhall (father)

International information
- National side: United States

Domestic team information
- Years: Team
- 1908–1912: Gentlemen of Philadelphia

Career statistics
Competition	First-class
Matches	7
Runs scored	235
Batting average	19.58
100s/50s	–/1
Top score	57
Balls bowled	72
Wickets	2
Bowling average	31.50
5 wickets in innings	–
10 wickets in match	–
Best bowling	2/30
Catches/stumpings	4/–
- Source: CricketArchive, January 23, 2011

William Price Newhall (January 30, 1883 – January 3, 1950) was an American cricketer. He played seven first-class matches between 1908 and 1913. Six of these were for the Philadelphian cricket team and the other was for a combined Canada/USA team. Newhall comes from a cricketing family, as his father and four uncles all played first-class cricket, and several other members of the family also played at a lower level. On at least one occasion, they made up all the members of a team.

== See also ==
- Young America Cricket Club
