= Henry Pearce (cricketer) =

American cricketer (1886–1936)

Personal information
- Full name: Henry George Pearce
- Born: April 21, 1886; United States
- Died: March 27, 1936 (aged 49); Philadelphia, Pennsylvania, U.S.

Domestic team information
- Years: Team
- 1908/09–1913: Gentlemen of Philadelphia

Career statistics
Competition	First-class
Matches	6
Runs scored	43
Batting average	6.14
100s/50s	0/0
Top score	14*
Balls bowled	720
Wickets	22
Bowling average	21.68
5 wickets in innings	1
10 wickets in match	0
Best bowling	7/57
Catches/stumpings	0/–
- Source: CricketArchive, January 22, 2011

Henry George Pearce (April 21, 1886 – March 27, 1936) was an American cricketer. He was a fast bowler, who played cricket in Philadelphia during cricket's brief North American "golden age". He first played for the Philadelphian cricket team in first-class cricket on their three match tour of Jamaica in 1909. He returned to the side for the home two match series against Australia, and followed this up with a match for a combined Canada/USA team, also against Australia, which was to be his final first-class appearance. Across his seven first-class matches, he took 22 wickets at an average of 21.68 with a best of 7/57 against Australia.
