= Pargat Singh (cricketer) =

Canadian cricketer (born 1992)

Personal information
- Full name: Pargat Singh
- Born: 13 April 1992 (age 34); Rupnagar, Punjab, India
- Batting: Right-handed
- Bowling: Right-arm offbreak
- Role: All-rounder

International information
- National side: Canada (2022–present)
- ODI debut (cap 89): 27 March 2023 v Jersey
- Last ODI: 26 September 2024 v Oman
- T20I debut (cap 64): 14 November 2022 v Bahrain
- Last T20I: 11 June 2024 v Pakistan

Domestic team information
- Years: Team
- 2015–2017: Punjab

Career statistics
Competition	ODI	T20I
Matches	18	19
Runs scored	733	312
Batting average	43.11	18.35
100s/50s	1/6	0/2
Top score	102	82
Balls bowled	138	48
Wickets	5	2
Bowling average	20.80	42.50
5 wickets in innings	0	0
10 wickets in match	0	0
Best bowling	2/22	2/25
Catches/stumpings	5/0	7/0
- Source: Cricinfo, 31 October 2024

Pargat Singh (born 13 April 1992) is an Indian-born cricketer who plays for the Canada national cricket team. He made his first-class debut on 22 October 2015 in the 2015–16 Ranji Trophy.

== Early life and family ==
Pargat Singh was born on 13 April 1992 in Rupnagar, Punjab, India. He spent most of his early life in Jalandar.

Singh moved to Canada with his family in 2020.

== Career ==
Singh made his List A debut on 10 December 2015 in the 2015–16 Vijay Hazare Trophy. He made his Twenty20 debut on 2 January 2016 in the 2015–16 Syed Mushtaq Ali Trophy.

In November 2022, Singh was named in Canada's T20I squad for the 2022 Desert Cup T20I Series. He made his T20I debut on 14 November 2022, against Bahrain.

In March 2023, Singh was named in Canada's squad for the 2023 Cricket World Cup Qualifier Play-off. He made his One Day International (ODI) debut on 27 March 2023, for Canada, against Jersey in that tournament. He scored his maiden century in ODI cricket on 1 April 2023, against the United Arab Emirates.

In May 2024, Singh was named in Canada’s squad for the 2024 ICC Men's T20 World Cup tournament.
