= Dexter Smith =

Bermudian cricketer (born 1961)

Personal information
- Born: 22 May 1961 (age 65); Bermuda

International information
- National side: Bermuda

Domestic team information
- Years: Team
- 1998/99–1999/00: Bermuda

Umpiring information
- T20Is umpired: 4 (2025)

Career statistics
Competition	List A
Matches	6
Runs scored	87
Batting average	14.50
100s/50s	0/0
Top score	28
Catches/stumpings	1/–
- Source: CricketArchive, 13 October 2011

Dexter Smith (born 22 May 1961) is a Bermudian former cricketer. He was a left-handed batsman who played in six List A matches for Bermuda in the Red Stripe Bowl, also representing them in two ICC Trophy tournaments. Smith now lives in Surrey, England; currently playing for Worcester Park Cricket Club.

== See also ==
- List of Twenty20 International cricket umpires
