= John Dornan (cricketer) =

American cricketer (1880–1959)

Personal information
- Full name: John Pickens Dornan
- Born: August 11, 1880; Germantown, Pennsylvania, U.S.
- Died: December 23, 1959 (aged 79); United States
- Role: Occasional wicket-keeper

Career statistics
Competition	First-class
Matches	1
Runs scored	21
Batting average	10.50
100s/50s	0/0
Top score	19
Catches/stumpings	3/–
- Source: CricketArchive, January 22, 2011

John Pickens Dornan (August 11, 1880 – December 23, 1959) was an American cricketer. He played one first-class match for a combined Canadian/United States team, against Australia in Manheim, Pennsylvania in 1913, scoring 21 runs in the match.
