= Vinod Babu =

Cricket umpire

Personal information
- Born: 20 May 1968 (age 58)
- Role: Umpire

Umpiring information
- ODIs umpired: 15 (2020–2025)
- T20Is umpired: 40 (2019–2025)
- WT20Is umpired: 10 (2021–2022)
- Source: Cricinfo, 11 December 2025

Vinod Babu (born 20 May 1968) is an international cricket umpire based in Oman.

== Career ==
On 20 January 2019, Babu made his Twenty20 International (T20I) umpiring debut, in a match between Maldives and Kuwait in the 2019 ACC Western Region T20 tournament. On 10 February 2019, Babu was selected to be part of the four-member umpire team for the T20I Quadrangular Series hosted by Oman from 13 to 17 February 2019. Babu was joined by fellow senior local umpire Rahul Asher and two International Cricket Council (ICC) officials, Graeme Labrooy and Ahsan Raza. His first ODI match as an umpire, on 6 January 2020, was between Namibia and the United Arab Emirates during the 2020 Oman Tri-Nation Series.

In November 2024, Babu was an official for the Netherland's Oman tour consisting of two T20I's and one ODI.

As of December 2025, he had officiated in 15 ODIs, and 40 T20Is, including 10 women's T20I matches.

== See also ==
- List of One Day International cricket umpires
- List of Twenty20 International cricket umpires
