= David Mathias =

Indian cricketer (born 1991)

Personal information
- Full name: David Keelan Mathias
- Born: 20 March 1991 (age 35); Karnataka, India
- Batting: Right-handed
- Role: Bowler

International information
- National side: Bahrain
- T20I debut (cap 23): 18 February 2022 v Germany
- Last T20I: 21 November 2022 v Saudi Arabia
- Source: ESPNcricinfo, 27 November 2022

David Keelan Mathias (born 20 March 1991) is an Indian-born cricketer who represents the Bahrain national cricket team.

Mathias grew up in Bahrain where his father Richard Mathias was the director of youth cricket for the Bahrain Cricket Association. He attended Sacred Heart School in Isa Town and was also coached in the UAE by Pakistani cricketers Tauseef Ahmed and Shahzad Altaf. At the age of 12, he represented Bahrain at the 2004 ACC Under-17 Cup in India.

Mathias has represented Karnataka in Indian domestic cricket. He made his first-class debut on 22 October 2015 in the 2015–16 Ranji Trophy.

In February 2022, Mathias was named in Bahrain's Twenty20 International (T20I) squad for the 2022 ICC Men's T20 World Cup Global Qualifier A tournament. He made his T20I debut on 18 February 2022 against Germany.
