= Jimmy Powell Oval =

Cricket ground

- Interactive map of Jimmy Powell Oval

Ground information
- Location: West Bay, Grand Cayman
- Country: Cayman Islands
- Coordinates: 19°22′48″N 81°24′09″W
- Establishment: 2004

International information
- First men's T20I: 13 April 2022: Cayman Islands v Bahamas
- Last men's T20I: 15 March 2026: Cayman Islands v Argentina
- As of 15 March 2026; Source: Cricinfo

Jimmy Powell Oval is a cricket ground in West Bay, Grand Cayman, near the city of George Town.

The ground is named after Jimmy Powell (born 1940), a former president of the Cayman Islands Cricket Association. In April 2022, the ground was the venue for the first Twenty20 International (T20I) matches to be held in the Cayman Islands, when the Cayman Islands team hosted a series against Bahamas. These were the first official T20I matches to be played in the Cayman Islands since the International Cricket Council (ICC) granted full T20I status to all competitive matches between its members from 1 January 2019.

In September 2026, the ground was the selected venue for the North American Cup 2026.
