= Kevon Fubler =

Bermudian cricketer

Personal information
- Full name: Kevon Fubler
- Born: 29 March 1992 (age 34); Bermuda
- Batting: Left-handed
- Bowling: Left-arm medium-fast

International information
- National side: Bermuda

Career statistics
Competition	First-class
Matches	1
Runs scored	15
Batting average	15.00
100s/50s	–/–
Top score	15
Balls bowled	66
Wickets	3
Bowling average	9.00
5 wickets in innings	–
10 wickets in match	–
Best bowling	3/15
Catches/stumpings	–/–
- Source: Cricinfo, 1 April 2013

Kevon Fubler (born 29 March 1992) is a Bermudian cricketer. Fubler is a left-handed batsman who bowls left-arm medium-fast.

Fubler made a single first-class appearance for Bermuda in 2009 in the Intercontinental Shield against Uganda at the National Stadium, Hamilton. Bermuda won the toss and elected to bat first, making 91 all out in their first-innings, with Fubler ending the innings not out without scoring. In response, Uganda made 119 all out in their first-innings, with Fubler taking the wickets of Roger Mukasa, Benjamin Musoke and Fred Isabirye to finish with figures of 3/15 from eight overs. Bermuda then made 138 all out in their second-innings, with Fubler scoring 15 runs from 92 balls before he was dismissed by Davis Arinaitwe. He bowled three wicketless overs in Uganda's second-innings, which saw them reach their victory target with seven wickets to spare. This remains his only major appearance for Bermuda.

In June 2016, Fubler received a seven-year ban from the Bermuda Cricket Board for his abusive and intimidating behaviour towards an umpire which occurred after his LBW dismissal in a club match for Willow Cuts.
