= Canada national cricket team =

Cricket teams representing Canada

Canada
- Nickname: Maple Leafers
- Association: Cricket Canada

Personnel
- Captain: Hamza Tariq
- Coach: Tejinderpal Singh

International Cricket Council
- ICC status: Associate member with ODI status (1968)
- ICC region: Americas
ICC Rankings	Current	Best-ever
ODI	19th	11th (01-Jan-2007)
T20I	19th	18th (19-Sep-2023)

One Day Internationals
- First ODI: v Pakistan at Headingley Cricket Ground, Leeds; 9 June 1979
- Last ODI: v Nepal at Oman Cricket Academy Ground Turf 1, Al Amarat; 17 October 2026
ODIs	Played	Won/Lost
Total	118	31/82 (1 tie, 4 no results)
This year	11	3/7 (0 ties, 1 no result)
- World Cup appearances: 4 (first in 1979)
- Best result: First round (1979, 2003, 2007, 2011)
- World Cup Qualifier appearances: 10 (first in 1979)
- Best result: Runner-up (1979, 2009)

T20 Internationals
- First T20I: v Netherlands at Stormont Cricket Ground, Belfast; 2 August 2008
- Last T20I: v Afghanistan at M. A. Chidambaram Stadium, Chennai; 19 February 2026
T20Is	Played	Won/Lost
Total	90	48/38 (2 ties, 2 no results)
This year	4	0/4 (0 ties, 0 no results)
- T20 World Cup appearances: 2 (first in 2024)
- Best result: Group stage (2024, 2026)
- T20 World Cup Qualifier appearances: 6 (Note: For the 2024 and 2026 Men's T20 World Cups, the final round of qualification in Americas was the ICC Americas Regional Final.) (first in 2008)
- Best result: Champions (2023, 2025)
ODI kit
T20I kit
- As of 17 October 2026

The Canada men's national cricket team represents Canada in international cricket. The team is administered by Cricket Canada, which became an associate member of the International Cricket Council (ICC) in 1968.

With the United States, Canada was one of the two participants in the first ever international cricket match (between two national teams) played in New York City in 1844. The annual Canada–U.S. fixture is now known as the Auty Cup. Canada's first international match against a team other than the U.S. came in 1932, when Australia toured. As with the ICC associate members, the team's first major international tournament was the 1979 ICC Trophy in England, where they qualified for the 1979 World Cup after placing second to Sri Lanka. After that, Canada did not make another World Cup until 2003, although they remained one of the leading associate teams. From 2006 to 2013, Canada had both One Day International (ODI) and Twenty20 International status, competing in the 2007 and 2011 World Cups. However, since the introduction of the new World Cricket League divisional structure, the team has been less successful – they were placed amongst the bottom teams at the 2014 World Cup Qualifier and the 2015 WCL Division Two tournaments, and were consequently relegated to the 2017 Division Three event.

In April 2018, the ICC decided to grant full Twenty20 International (T20I) status to all its members. Therefore, all Twenty20 matches played between Canada and other ICC members since 1 January 2019 have had the T20I status. Canada regained ODI status by finishing above PNG in 2023 Cricket World Cup Qualifier Play-off, and will play the 2024–2026 Cricket World Cup League 2.

== History ==
=== Early days ===
It is generally thought that cricket was introduced to Canada by British soldiers after the Battle of the Plains of Abraham in 1759, although the earliest confirmed reference to cricket is of matches played on Saint Helen's Island, Quebec in 1785 on what later became the site of Expo 67.

The roots of modern Canadian cricket though come from the regions of Upper Canada, in particular Toronto, then known as York. During the early years of the nineteenth century, a schoolmaster by the name of George Anthony Barber encouraged the game there, and founded the Toronto Cricket Club in 1827. Barber instigated a game played between the Toronto Cricket Club and the cricket team of Upper Canada College in 1836, a game won by the college team. This game has been played annually ever since. As already mentioned, Canada played its first international against the U.S. in 1844 in New York at St George's Cricket Club, now the site of the New York University Medical Center.

24–26 September 1844
Scorecard

Canada	v	United States
82 (32 overs); David Winckworth, George Sharpe, Freeling 12; Samuel Wright 5		64; Robert Tinson 14; David Winckworth, Fred French 4
63; David Winckworth 14; Henry Groom 5		58; James Turner 14; George Sharpe 6

Canada won by 23 runs
St. George's Cricket Club, New York City
Attendance: 20,000
Umpires: J.H. Conolly, H. Russell, R. Waller

- United States of America won the toss and elected to field.
- Rain prevented any play occurring on Day 2. The match was extended into a third day.
- George Wheatcroft (batting for the USA) failed to arrive in time to take part in the match on the third day – Alfred Marsh fielded as the substitute for him.

=== Late 19th century ===
George Parr led an English team to Canada in 1859, which was the first ever international cricket tour. A product of the tour was a book by Fred Lillywhite entitled The English Cricketers' Trip to Canada and the United States, published the following year. On the tour, which also ventured into the United States, the team won all five official matches against a 22 of Lower Canada (by 8 wickets at Montreal, Quebec on 26 October – 27 September), a 22 of the United States (by an innings and 64 runs at Hoboken, New Jersey on 3–5 October), a different 22 of the United States (by 7 wickets at Philadelphia on 10–12 October), a 22 of Lower Canada (by 10 wickets at Hamilton, Ontario on 17–19 October) and a further 22 of the United States (by an innings and 68 runs at Rochester, New York on 21–25 October). There were also some exhibition matches and two excursions to view the Niagara Falls.

When Canada became a nation in 1867, cricket was so popular it was declared the national sport by John A. Macdonald, the first Prime Minister of Canada. The influence of baseball from the United States saw a decline in the popularity of cricket, despite tours from English and Australian teams. The third tour by an English team in 1872 featured none other than the famous W. G. Grace. The first Australian team to tour came in 1877, and they returned in 1893 beating Canada by an innings. Three games were played against Ireland between 1888 and 1890, with Ireland winning one, with the other two drawn. A tour of North America by the Australians in 1913 saw two first-class games (both won by the visitors) against a combined Canada–U.S. team. (Note: Combined Canada/U.S. players included: Henry Humphries (Canada); John Dornan (United States); Arthur Hoskings (United States); Willard Graham (United States); William Newhall (United States); Timothy Bevington (Canada); Henry Humphries (Canada); Harold Furness (United States); Robert Anderson (United States); Henry Pearce (United States); Christie Morris (United States)) The second of these, played at Rosedale, Toronto, was the first first-class match played in Canada.

=== 1887 England tour ===
The first official tour of the United Kingdom by a Canadian team took place in 1887: an unofficial tour in 1880 had been abandoned after Canadian captain Thomas Dale (playing under the alias Thomas Jordan) was arrested on charges of desertion and fraud during a match against Leicestershire.

The tour started with two matches against Ireland, against whom Canada drew one game and lost the other, followed by two matches against Scotland with the same result. The tour then ventured into the north east of England with a defeat against the Gentlemen of Northumberland and a draw against Durham.

The tour then continued with various matches against county sides and others, with wins coming against the Gentlemen of Derbyshire and the Gentlemen of Warwickshire. The Canadian team finished the tour with a win–loss record of 2/5 with the remaining twelve games all drawn.

=== 1950s ===
The Marylebone Cricket Club visited Canada in 1951, the highlight of which was the first first-class game played by the Canadian national team, played in Armour Heights, Toronto, which was won by the visiting side. This was followed in 1954 by a tour to England on which Canada played eighteen games, four of which were given first-class status, including one against Pakistan who were also touring England at the same time. The MCC again visited Canada in 1959 under Dennis Silk, and played a 3-day game against a Canada XI in Toronto which they won by 10 wickets. They were undefeated throughout the tour, winning most of their matches by wide margins, but had a closely fought draw against the Toronto Cricket Club. This was the decade when the Imperial Cricket Conference had plans to grant Canada Test status, but Canada themselves postponed the idea as they felt that the Canadian national team was not of sufficient standard, and that competing against full-members' sides needed some time as they wanted to improve their cricket even domestically. However, things did not go as planned and it would be fifty years before Canada next played a first-class match.

=== 1960s ===
The annual series of matches between Canada and the U.S. continued, alternating between the countries. In the 1963 match in Toronto, Ray Nascimento scored 176, then a record for the series.

=== 1970s ===
Canada drew a game against Ireland in 1973, and the following year again embarked on a tour of England. The tour was a much lower profile than the 1954 tour, with the games being against club sides, county second XIs, and minor counties. Canada had a 4/6 win–loss record on the tour, with a further six games being drawn. In 1979, Canada participated in the first ICC Trophy. They reached the final of the competition, which qualified them for the 1979 World Cup, where they played their first One Day Internationals.

9 June 1979
Scorecard

Canada; 139/9 (60 overs)	v	Pakistan; 140/2 (40.1 overs)

Pakistan won by 8 wickets
Headingley, Leeds, England
(First ever ODI match for Canada)

The World Cup was not a successful tournament for the Canadians though, and they failed to progress beyond the first round, losing all three games.

=== 1980s ===
Canada participated in the ICC Trophy again in 1982 and 1986. They could not repeat their success of 1979 though, and failed to progress beyond the first round on both occasions. Other internationals in the 1980s include a no result game against Ireland in 1981, and a 3 wicket loss to Barbados.

=== 1990s ===
The 1990s saw Canada progress up the international ladder, playing in three further ICC Trophy tournaments, their best being a seventh-place finish in 1997. They also began competing in West Indian domestic one-day cricket in 1996, and competed in the Commonwealth Games cricket tournament in 1998, though they did not progress beyond the first round.

=== 2000s ===
2000 saw Canada host the first ICC Americas Championship, a tournament which they won. The following year they embarked on a tour to Sri Lanka, but the highlight of 2001 was their hosting of the ICC Trophy. They finished third in the tournament, which qualified them for the 2003 World Cup. It was this ICC Trophy tournament that first saw the emergence of John Davison, who was to become one of Canada's most successful players.

Canada played various matches in the buildup to the World Cup, visiting Argentina in April 2002, finishing as runners up to longtime rivals the U.S. in the Americas Championship, swiftly followed by a fifth-place finish in the ICC 6 Nations Challenge in Namibia. The West Indian A team toured Canada later in the year, and Canada won the one-day series 2–1, and drew a two-day game. This was followed by Canada's best performance to date in West Indian domestic one-day cricket, winning two games in their first round group, just missing out on qualification for the semi-finals.

The World Cup itself was a tournament of contrasting fortunes for the Canadians. They started with their first ODI win, over Bangladesh. Two games later saw them dismissed for 36 against Sri Lanka, then the lowest score in One Day International history. The next game against the West Indies saw John Davison score the fastest ever World Cup century, although Canada lost that game, and did not progress past the first round.

11 February 2003
Scorecard

Canada; 180 (49.1 overs)	v	Bangladesh; 120 (28 overs)

Canada won by 60 runs
Sahara Stadium Kingsmead, Durban, South Africa

=== ODI Success (2004–2011) ===
2006 started badly for Canada, with a last place finish in the Six Nations Challenge in the United Arab Emirates after Canada lost all their games. They had improved significantly by the time of the ICC Americas Championship in Bermuda, which they won. Also in 2004, Canada participated in the first ICC Intercontinental Cup, finishing as runners up to Scotland. The highlight of this tournament was the game against the U.S. in Fort Lauderdale, Florida, when John Davison recorded the best match bowling figures since Jim Laker's 19 wickets against Australia in 1956.

In 2005, Canada again finished third in the ICC Trophy, which gained them official ODI status from 2006 until the 2009 ICC World Cup Qualifier, as well as qualifying them for the 2007 World Cup. Their performance in the Intercontinental Cup that year was not as good as in 2004 however, as they did not make it past the first round.

In 2006, Canada put in good performances in the four-day ICC Intercontinental Cup, beating Kenya by 25 runs and Bermuda by nine wickets, but their one-day form was a complete reversal, losing three times to Bermuda and Kenya, and a further loss to Zimbabwe.

In August, Canada took part in the first Division of the Americas Championship. They beat Argentina and longtime rivals the United States, but lost to the Cayman Islands and eventual winners Bermuda, and finished third, their worst performance so far in this tournament.

In June and July 2008, Canada hosted Bermuda for three ODIs and Intercontinental Cup matches against Bermuda and Scotland.

In August, Canada travelled to Ireland for the World Twenty20 Qualification Tournament. Canada did not qualify for the World Twenty20, finishing 5th ahead of Bermuda. The ODIs and an Intercontinental Cup match were hampered by rain.

In late summer of 2008, West Indies and Bermuda came to Canada to play in the Scotiabank One-Day Series against Canada. Canada defeated Bermuda, to face West Indies in the Final. West Indies captain Chris Gayle smashed his sixteenth ODI century and led his side to an easy seven-wicket victory against Canada in the finals of the Scotiabank ODI Series at King City.

During the Scotiabank Series the talents of Rizwan Cheema were discovered – he would become the star of the first Al-Barakah T20 Canada. The tournament involved Canada, Pakistan, Sri Lanka and Zimbabwe. Canada lost both and tied one match, however in the tie with Zimbabwe, Canada lost by points in a bowl-out. Sri Lanka were eventual winners, defeating Pakistan in the Final. The tournament was expected to be played annually for the following four years.

In late November 2008, Canada participated in the Americas Championship in Florida, United States. The United States, after years of disarray, pulled together and won the championship. Canada finished 3rd on Net Run Rate behind Bermuda, as their match was washed out by rain.

In April 2009 Canada participated in the 2009 ICC Cricket World Cup Qualification Tournament. Assembling the best Canadian team in many years, Canada rolled through the opening stages of the event and eventually finished second in the tournament. The impressive display earned Canada a berth in the 2011 ICC Cricket World Cup.

=== Fall from grace (2012–2021) ===
The ICC announced that the 2015 Cricket World Cup will only have 10 participating teams – this makes it difficult for the Associate Countries to qualify for the World Cup. Cricket Canada expressed its unhappiness with the reduced world cup

In January 2014, Canada lost ODI & T20I status and with no prospect of big-stage international cricket to come until next qualifier, owing to a poor performance at the World Cup Qualifier in New Zealand. In May of 2015, Canada played in the ICC Americas Region Division One Twenty20 tournament and won all six matches they played. Nikhil Dutta took the second most wickets in the tournament with 12 wickets and Ruvindu Gunasekera scored the second most runs with 196 runs. The big event for Canada to make a mark in the year 2015 was the ICC World Twenty20 Qualifier in Ireland and Scotland. Canada failed to win a single match and finished at the bottom of Group B.

In the first match, against Kenya in the picturesque Edinburgh, Canada put together 143 runs in 20 overs with the loss of 5 wickets. In response, Irfan Karim's 54-ball 74 led Kenya to a convincing seven-wicket win.

The second match for Canada was against Oman, and was played in Stirling, Scotland. This game was reduced to 13 overs a side, down from 20 due to inclement weather. Batting first, Canada's Nitish Kumar scored a 25-ball 52 with four fours and three sixes. In response, Zeeshan Maqsood's unbeaten 86 powered Oman to a seven-wicket win with 10 balls to spare.

Canada played their third match of the tournament at the same venue in Stirling, Scotland against United Arab Emirates. Canada, batting first, lost their first 2 wickets within the first 8 balls. It was followed by a solid partnership between Hiral Shah and Nitish Kumar who plundered 58 runs between them. However, UAE picked up several wickets to reduce Canada down to 109 for the loss of 9 wickets. Navneet Dhaliwal came in with an unbeaten 39 to raise the total to 132 runs at the end of 20 overs. In response, UAE lost their first wicket in the third over but good partnerships for the second (25 runs), third (40 runs) and fourth (19 runs) wickets kept them on track. The match seemed level when the target was whittled down to 33 runs required in three overs which came down to 25 runs required off 12 balls. But, Shakoor and Patil brought UAE home in the last over after plundering Cecil Parvez for 21 runs in his final over.

Canada shifted back to Edinburgh for their fourth match of the tournament against hosts Scotland. Canada had lost the coin-toss again in this match and the home team inserted Canada into batting first. They got off to a quick start, racing to 24 in 2.3 overs before Alasdair Evans dismissed Ruvindu Gunasekara. The other bowlers too did not allow any meaningful partnerships to develop between any of the Canadian batsmen, reducing them to 87 for the loss of 8 wickets by the 16th over. A 48-run, ninth-wicket partnership between Navneet Dhaliwal (34*) and No. 10 Junaid Siddiqui, who scored 28 off 16, took them past the triple-figure mark to help them finish on 135 for 8. In response, Scotland started off brightly – at a stunning rate of 10 runs per over until the sixth over – even as Satsimranjit Dhindsa got rid of Calum MacLeod for a 15-ball 29. The wicket didn't cost Scotland much as they went about with the same momentum despite losing Matthew Cross to Dhindsa as well, and cruised to a comfortable win with 32 balls to spare.

Canada played their fifth and final match of the tournament at the same venue in Edinburgh against Netherlands. They lost the toss again and were inserted to bat again. This time though, the batting showed resilience and the team put together a total of 172 for the loss of 8 wickets which came on the back of a half-century from Ruvindu Gunasekera (51) and late blitzes from team captain Rizwan Cheema and wicket-keeper batsman Hamza Tariq. In response, the Netherlands batsmen, particularly Steven Myburgh, Wesley Barresi and Michael Swart led an attacking display of powerful batting to record a solid win for their team with 15 balls to spare. Thus, ending a dismal 2015 ICC World Twenty20 Qualifier for the Canada national cricket team.

Following the dismal performance at the 2015 ICC World Twenty20 qualifier, some positive news followed for the Canada national cricket team players. Twenty-one players from Canada along with the United States, Bermuda and Suriname were shortlisted to play for an 'ICC Americas' regional team to take part in West Indies' Nagico Super50 tournament in January 2016. By the end of the process, Jeremy Gordon was the only Canada bowler to be included and Canadian Hamza Tariq was brought in as a specialist wicket keeper in the final 15 man ICC Americas squad declared to participate in West Indies' Nagico Super50 in January 2016.

In 2016, Canada played the U.S. in the Auty Cup and won the tournament by beating the U.S. in 2 out of 3 matches.

In 2017, Canada embarked on a tour of Zimbabwe, winning the warm-up match but losing 3 matches to Zimbabwe. Canada also played in the ICC World Cricket League Division Three Tournament, placing second overall by winning 3 out of 5 matches. In the 2017 Auty Cup, Canada lost to the United States, winning only 1 out of 3 matches.

In 2018, Canada played in the ICC World Cricket League Division Two tournament, placing third overall by winning 3 out of 5 matches. Canada competed in the ICC World Twenty20 Americas Sub Regional Qualifier A 2018, placing second overall and advancing to the 2019 T20 World Cup Americas Region Final. Canada placed last in the 2018 Super50 Cup, winning 1 out of 6 matches.

Canada placed 5th in the ICC World Cricket League Division Two 2019, winning 2 out of their 5 matches. After winning the Americas Region Qualifier Final, Canada also participated in the ICC Men's T20 World Cup Qualifier 2019, placing fifth and not qualifying for the 2021 T20 World Cup.

Due to the COVID-19 pandemic, the Canada National Team did not play matches from 2020 to late 2021. In November of 2021, Canada placed second in the ICC Men's T20 World Cup Americas Region Qualifier, advancing to the global qualifiers.

=== Rebuilding and success (2022-Present) ===
In the T20 Global Qualifier A, Canada placed fifth and did not advance to the 2022 T20 Global Tournament which led the return of the head coach Pubudu Dassanayake and his appointing of Saad Bin Zafar as full time captain. In July, Nepal took a tour of Canada, where the Canadian team won a match. In November, Canada competed in the Desert Cup T20I Series where they placed first and won 5 out of their 6 matches. Ammar Khalid took the most wickets in the tournament with 12 wickets, and Aaron Johnson made the most runs with 402 runs. Canada also went on a tour of Oman, where Canada won the 3-match series 2-1. The CWC League A 2019 tournament was continued in 2022 after delays due to the pandemic, where Canada won by winning 13 out of their 15 matches.

In the 2023 ICC Cricket World Cup Qualifier Play-Off, Canada placed fourth by winning 3 matches out of 5 and, as a result, regained One Day International (ODI) status after 9 years. Canada’s Jeremy Gordon placed third in Top Wicket Takers, taking 12 wickets in the course of the tournament. Canada advanced to the 2023-2027 ICC Cricket World Cup League 2.

Later that year, Canada won the ICC Men’s T20 World Cup Americas Region Final and subsequently secured a spot in the 2024 T20 World Cup by winning 4 out of 5 matches. Kaleem Sana was the top wicket taker of the tournament, taking 15 wickets and was named player of the match in the final game. Aaron Johnson and Navneet Dhaliwal placed second and third in top run scorers, getting 187 and 116 runs respectively.

In February, Canada played in the Hong Kong Tri Series and won two matches, placing second overall. Over the course of three games, Dillon Heyliger and Uday Bhagwan took 6 and 5 wickets respectively. Canada also toured Nepal in February, losing 3 ODI matches to Nepal.

In March, Canada won 4 matches against Scotland and the UAE in the ICC Men’s Cricket World Cup League 2. So far, Harsh Thaker is the top run scorer with 234 runs and Dillon Heyliger has taken the third most wickets with 9 wickets. With their winning streak, Canada ranks first in the league.

In April, Canada went on another tour in the United States, losing 4 matches to the American team. Aaron Johnson was the top run scorer of all the matches with 124 runs, and Saad Bin Zafar took the third most wickets with 5 wickets.

In a T20 World Cup Warm-Up Match, Canada beat Nepal by 63 runs. In the T20 World Cup in June, Canada played the United States, Pakistan, Ireland, and India teams in Group A in the 2024 T20 World Cup hosted by the West Indies and the United States where they won against Ireland, fell short against Pakistan and USA and one match against India was called off due to rain. Canada finished 13th in this tournament out of 20 teams.

== International grounds ==
Locations of all stadiums which have hosted an international cricket match within Canada

Ground	City	Province	Capacity	Matches hosted	Notes
Maple Leaf Cricket Club	King City	Ontario	7,000	ODIs, T20Is	Canada's primary international venue
Toronto Cricket Ground	Toronto	Ontario	4,875	ODIs	Historic ground, hosted Sahara Cup (1996–1998)

== Current squad ==
The following is a list of players who have played for Canada in the past year, and any players (in italics) who have been selected in the team's most recent ODI or T20I squad. Updated 13 November 2026

Name	Age	Batting style	Bowling style	Notes	Last ODI	Last T20I
Batters
Samit Gohel	36	Right-Handed	Slow left-arm orthodox		(Nepal) 2026	–
Nicholas Kirton	28	Left-Handed	Right-arm off break		(United Arab Emirates) 2026	(Afghanistan) 2026
Sheel Patel	22	Right-Handed	Slow left-arm orthodox		(Nepal) 2026	–
Pargat Singh	34	Right-handed	Right-arm off break		(Scotland) 2026	(Bermuda) 2025
Yuvraj Samra	20	Left-handed	Right-arm medium		(Nepal) 2026	(Afghanistan) 2026
Aaditya Varadarajan	35	Left-handed	Right-arm medium		(Nepal) 2026	–
All-rounders
Saad Bin Zafar	40	Left-handed	Slow left-arm orthodox		(Scotland) 2026	(Afghanistan) 2026
Warren Campbell	28	Right-handed	Slow left-arm orthodox		–	–
Akhil Kumar	24	Right-handed	Right-arm medium		(Nepal) 2026	(United States) 2025
Shivam Sharma	28	Right-handed	Right-arm Off break		(Oman) 2026	(New Zealand) 2026
Matthew Spoors	27	Right-handed	Right-arm wrist spin		(United Arab Emirates) 2026	(Oman) 2022
Harsh Thaker	29	Right-handed	Right-arm off break		(Nepal) 2026	(Afghanistan) 2026
Wicket-keepers
Toby Albert	25	Right-handed	Right-arm off break		–	–
Shreyas Movva	33	Right-handed	—N/a		(Nepal) 2026	(Afghanistan) 2026
Ali Nadeem	34	Right-handed	—N/a		(United States) 2026	(United States) 2025
Hamza Tariq	36	Right-handed	—N/a	Captain	(Nepal) 2026	(Bahrain) 2022
Spin Bowlers
Ansh Patel	24	Right-handed	Left-arm wrist spin		(Scotland) 2026	(Afghanistan) 2026
Sukhjinder Singh	32	Right-handed	Slow left-arm orthodox		(Nepal) 2026	(United States) 2025
Pace Bowlers
Dillon Heyliger	37	Right-handed	Right-arm medium		(United States) 2025	(Afghanistan) 2026
Kaleem Sana	32	Right-handed	Left-arm medium		(Nepal) 2026	(Afghanistan) 2026
Zahid Shirzad	26	Right-handed	Right-arm medium-fast		(Nepal) 2026	–

== Administration and support staff ==
Position	Name	Ref.
Head coach	Monty Desai	
Batting coach	Abdool Samad	
Bowling coach	Mukesh Narula	

== Sponsorship ==
In 2023, Canada Cricket formed a strategic partnership with Boundaries North to lead initiatives to build the sport’s presence in Canada and harvest its commercial potential. Boundaries North signed up TD Bank, Nissan, Coca-Cola, No-frills, Maxi and A&W Burgers to be the current sponsors of the Canada National Team.

Current Sponsorships
Official Bank Partner	TD Bank
Official Automotive Partner	Nissan
Official Drink Partner	Coca-Cola
Official Restaurant Partner	A&W Restaurants
Official Grocery Partners	No Frills & Maxi

=== Kit manufacturers ===
Period	Kit manufacturer
2009	Kukri Sports
2010	Ihsan Sports
2012-2014	Reebok
2015-2016	Admiral Sportswear
2017-2021	Bhaji Sports
2022-2023	Yashi Sports
2024–2025	O'Neills
2026-Present	T10 Sports

== Tournament history ==
Legend

- Champions
- Runners-up
- Third place/Semi-finals
- Hosts
- Q Qualified/Advanced to next stage
- DNQ Did not qualify
- ▲ Promoted
- Remained in the same division
- ▼ Relegated

=== Cricket World Cup ===
Cricket World Cup record								Qualification record				
Year	Round	Position	Pld	W	L	T	NR	Pld	W	L	T	NR
(England) 1975	Not invited							No qualifiers held				
(England) 1979	Group stage	8/8	3	0	3	0	0	6	4	2	0	0
(England) (Wales) 1983	Did not qualify							7	3	1	0	3
(India) (Pakistan) 1987	Did not qualify							8	5	3	0	0
(Australia) (New Zealand) 1992	Did not qualify							6	3	3	0	0
(India) (Pakistan) (Sri Lanka) 1996	Did not qualify							7	3	3	0	1
(England) (Wales) (Scotland) (Republic of Ireland) (Netherlands) 1999	Did not qualify							8	4	2	0	2
(South Africa) (Zimbabwe) (Kenya) 2003	Group stage	12/14	6	1	5	0	0	10	6	4	0	0
(Cricket West Indies) 2007	Group stage	14/16	3	0	3	0	0	12	10	2	0	0
(India) (Sri Lanka) (Bangladesh) 2011	Group stage	12/14	6	1	5	0	0	13	8	5	0	0
(Australia) (New Zealand) 2015	Did not qualify							26	5	19	0	2
(England) (Wales) 2019	Did not qualify							17	8	9	0	1
(India) 2023	Did not qualify							20	16	3	0	1
(South Africa) (Zimbabwe) (Namibia) 2027	To be determined							36*	12	19	0	5
Total	0 Titles	4/13	18	2	16	0	0	176	87	75	0	15

=== Cricket World Cup Qualifier ===
Cricket World Cup Qualifier record
Year	Round	Position	Pld	W	L	T	NR	Qual.
(Sri Lanka) 1979	Runners-up	2/15	6	4	2	0	0	Q
(England) 1982	Group stage	5/16	7	3	1	0	3	DNQ
(England) 1986	Group stage	6/12	8	5	3	0	0	DNQ
(Netherlands) 1990	Second round	7/17	6	3	3	0	0	DNQ
(Kenya) 1994	Second round	15/20	7	3	3	0	1	DNQ
(Malaysia) 1997	Plate round	7/22	8	4	2	0	2	DNQ
(Canada) 2001	3rd place play-off	3/24	10	6	4	0	0	Q
(Ireland) 2005	Semi-finals	3/12	7	5	2	0	0	Q
(South Africa) 2009	Runners-up	2/12	13	8	5	0	0	Q
(New Zealand) 2014	Play-offs	8/10	6	2	4	0	0	DNQ
(Zimbabwe) 2018	Did not qualify							
(Zimbabwe) 2023	Did not qualify							
(Namibia) (South Africa) 2027	To be determined							
Total	0 Titles	10/13	78	43	29	0	6	—N/a

=== CWC League 2 ===
Cricket World Cup League 2 record
Year	Round	Position	Pld	W	L	T	NR	P/R
2019–2023	Part of Challenge League							
2024–2026	League stage	7/8	36	12	19	0	5	TBD
Total	0 Titles	1/2	36	12	19	0	5	—N/a

=== CWC Challenge League ===
Cricket World Cup Challenge League record
Year	Round	League	Position	Pld	W	L	T	NR	P/R
2019–2022	A	Champions	1/6	15	13	1	0	1	▲
2024–2026	Part of League 2								
Total		1 Title	1/2	15	13	1	0	1	—N/a

=== Men's T20 World Cup ===
Men's T20 World Cup record								Qualification record				
Year	Round	Position	Pld	W	L	T	NR	Pld	W	L	T	NR
(South Africa) 2007	Did not qualify							5	2	3	0	0
(England) 2009	Did not qualify							3	2	1	0	0
(Cricket West Indies) 2010	Did not qualify							3	0	3	0	0
(Sri Lanka) 2012	Did not qualify							14	10	4	0	0
(Bangladesh) 2014	Did not qualify							8	2	6	0	0
(India) 2016	Did not qualify							12	6	5	0	1
(United Arab Emirates) (Oman) 2021	Did not qualify							12	8	3	0	1
(Australia) 2022	Did not qualify							11	8	3	0	0
(United States) (Cricket West Indies) 2024	Group Stage	13/20	4	1	2	0	1	6	4	1	0	1
(India) (Sri Lanka) 2026	Group Stage	18/20	4	0	4	0	0	6	6	0	0	0
(Australia) (New Zealand) 2028	To be determined							To be determined				
Total	0 Titles	2/10	8	1	6	0	1	80	48	29	0	3

=== T20 World Cup Global Qualifier ===
Men's T20 World Cup Global Qualifier record
Year	Round	Position	Pld	W	L	T	NR	Qual.
(Ireland) 2008	Play-offs	5/6	3	2	1	0	0	DNQ
(United Arab Emirates) 2010	Group stage	8/8	3	0	3	0	0	DNQ
(United Arab Emirates) 2012	Play-offs	6/16	9	5	4	0	0	DNQ
(United Arab Emirates) 2013	Play-offs	12/16	8	2	6	0	0	DNQ
(Ireland) (Scotland) 2015	Group stage	14/14	6	0	5	0	1	DNQ
(United Arab Emirates) 2019	Group stage	9/14	6	3	3	0	0	DNQ
(Oman) 2022 (A)	Play-offs	5/8	5	3	2	0	0	DNQ
(To be determined) 2028	Qualified							
Total	0 Titles	8/8	40	15	24	0	1	—N/a

=== T20 World Cup Americas Regional Final ===
T20 World Cup Americas Regional Final records
Year	Round	Position	Pld	W	L	T	NR	Qual.
(Bermuda) 2018	Champions	1/4	6	5	0	0	1	Q
(Antigua and Barbuda) 2021	Runners-up	2/7	6	5	1	0	0	Q
(Bermuda) 2023	Champions	1/4	6	4	1	0	1	Q
(Canada) 2025	Champions	1/4	6	6	0	0	0	Q
Total	4/4	4 Titles	24	20	2	0	2	—N/a

=== North American Cup ===
Year	Round	Position	Pld	W	L	T	NR	Ref
(Cayman Islands) 2025	Runners-up	2/5	6	5	1	0	0	
(Bermuda) 2026	Did not participate							
Total	0 Titles	1/2	6	5	1	0	0	—N/a

=== Commonwealth Games ===
Commonwealth Games record
Year	Round	Position	Pld	W	L	T	NR
(Malaysia) 1998	Group stage	15/16	3	0	3	0	0
Total	0 Titles	1/1	3	0	3	0	0

=== Other international tournaments ===
CWC Qualifier Play-off (ODI)	ICC Intercontinental Cup (FC)	World Cricket League (LA/ODI/50 overs)
2023: 4th place; 2026: Qualified	2004: Runners up; 2005: First round; 2006: Runners up; 2007–08: 7th place; 2009–10: 7th place; 2011–13: 6th place	2007 (Division One): 4th place; 2010 (Division One): 5th place; 2011–13 (Championship): 8th place (▼); 2015 Division Two: 6th place (▼); 2017 Division Three: 2nd place (▲); 2018 Division Two: 3rd place; 2019 Division Two: 5th place

=== Other regional tournaments ===
T20WC Americas Sub-regional Qualifiers (T20I)	ICC Americas Championship (List A)	Americas T20 Division One (T20)
2018: Runners-up (Q)	2000: Winners; 2002: Runners-up; 2004: Winners; 2006: 3rd place; 2008: 3rd place; 2009-10: Winners; 2011: Winners	2011: Winners; 2015: Winners

== Records ==
International Match Summary – Canada

Playing record
Format	M	W	L	T	NR	Inaugural match
One Day Internationals	118	31	82	1	4	9 June 1979
Twenty20 Internationals	90	48	38	2	2	2 August 2008

Last updated 17 October 2026.

=== One Day Internationals ===
- Highest team total: 312/4 v Ireland, 4 February 2007 at Jaffery Sports Club Ground, Nairobi.
- Highest individual score: 137*, Ashish Bagai v Scotland, 31 January 2007 at Ruaraka Sports Club Ground, Nairobi.
- Best individual bowling figures: 6/43, Jeremy Gordon v Papua New Guinea, 15 April 2023 at Windhoek, Windhoek.

Most ODI runs for Canada

Player	Runs	Average	Career span
Ashish Bagai	1964	37.76	2003–2013
Pargat Singh	1,045	33.70	2023–2026
Harsh Thaker	1,032	32.25	2023–2026
Sunil Dhaniram	915	24.72	2006–2010
John Davison	799	26.63	2003–2011

Most ODI wickets for Canada

Player	Wickets	Average	Career span
Kaleem Sana	55	23.74	2023–2026
Henry Osinde	45	30.86	2006–2013
Harvir Baidwan	44	30.63	2008–2014
Sunil Dhaniram	41	30.24	2006–2010
Dillon Heyliger	37	23.89	2023–2025

Highest individual innings in ODI

Player	Score	Opposition	Venue	Year
Ashish Bagai	137*	Scotland	Nairobi	31 January 2007
Abdool Samad	130	Bermuda	King City	1 July 2008
Ashish Bagai	122	Ireland	Nairobi	4 February 2007
Sandeep Jyoti	117	Scotland	Aberdeen	7 July 2009
Harsh Thaker	111*	United Arab Emirates	Dubai	5 March 2024

Best bowling figures in an innings in ODI

Player	Score	Opposition	Venue	Year
Jeremy Gordon	6/43	Papua New Guinea	Windhoek	5 April 2023
Austin Codrington	5/27	Bangladesh	Durban	11 February 2003
Dilon Heyliger	5/31	Nepal	King City	16 September 2024
Sunil Dhaniram	5/32	Bermuda	King City	29 June 2008
Khurram Chohan	5/68	Scotland	Christchurch	23 January 2014

ODI record versus other nations

Records complete to ODI 5035. Last updated 17 October 2026.

Opponent	M	W	L	T	NR	First Match	First win
v Test nations
Afghanistan	5	1	4	0	0	16 February 2010	18 February 2010
Australia	2	0	2	0	0	16 June 1979	
Bangladesh	2	1	1	0	0	11 February 2003	11 February 2003
England	2	0	2	0	0	13 June 1979	
Ireland	8	2	6	0	0	4 February 2007	4 February 2007
New Zealand	3	0	3	0	0	3 March 2003	
Pakistan	2	0	2	0	0	9 June 1979	
South Africa	1	0	1	0	0	27 February 2003	
Sri Lanka	2	0	2	0	0	19 February 2003	
West Indies	4	0	4	0	0	23 February 2003	
Zimbabwe	2	0	2	0	0	16 May 2006	
v Associate Members
Bermuda	11	6	5	0	0	17 May 2006	27 November 2006
Jersey	1	1	0	0	0	27 March 2023	27 March 2023
Kenya	15	5	9	0	1	15 February 2003	24 January 2007
Namibia	5	0	4	1	0	4 April 2023	
Nepal	7	3	4	0	0	8 February 2024	16 September 2024
Netherlands	14	1	10	0	3	26 November 2006	10 June 2026
Oman	6	3	3	0	0	20 September 2024	20 September 2024
Papua New Guinea	1	1	0	0	0	5 April 2023	5 April 2023
Scotland	14	4	10	0	0	18 January 2007	8 April 2009
United Arab Emirates	4	2	2	0	0	1 April 2023	28 February 2024
United States	7	1	6	0	0	29 March 2023	29 March 2023

=== Twenty20 Internationals ===
- Highest team total: 245/1 v. Panama, 14 November 2021 at Coolidge Cricket Ground, Antigua.
- Highest individual score: 121*, Aaron Johnson v. Panama, 3 October 2023 at Bermuda National Stadium, Hamilton.
- Best individual bowling figures: 5/16, Dillon Heyliger v. Argentina, 13 November 2021 at Coolidge Cricket Ground, Antigua.

Most T20I runs for Canada

Player	Runs	Average	Career span
Navneet Dhaliwal	1,197	32.35	2019–2025
Aaron Johnson	910	32.50	2022–2025
Nicholas Kirton	744	26.57	2019–2025
Harsh Thaker	706	24.34	2019–2025
Ravinderpal Singh	702	24.17	2019–2025

Most T20I wickets for Canada

Player	Wickets	Average	Career span
Saad Bin Zafar	76	18.84	2019–2026
Kaleem Sana	64	13.37	2022–2025
Dillon Heyliger	54	22.44	2019–2025
Harsh Thaker	39	19.82	2019–2025
Harvir Baidwan	27	15.22	2008–2013

T20I record versus other nations

Records complete to T20I #3726. Last updated 19 February 2026.

Opponent	M	W	L	T	NR	First Match	First win
v Test nations
Afghanistan	3	0	3	0	0	4 February 2010	
India	1	0	0	0	1	15 June 2024	
Ireland	5	3	2	0	0	3 February 2010	3 February 2010
New Zealand	1	0	1	0	0	17 February 2026	
Pakistan	2	0	2	0	0	10 October 2008	
South Africa	1	0	1	0	0	9 February 2026	
Sri Lanka	1	0	1	0	0	12 October 2008	
Zimbabwe	2	0	1	1	0	11 October 2008	
v Associate Members
Argentina	1	1	0	0	0	13 November 2021	13 November 2021
Bahamas	5	5	0	0	0	7 November 2021	7 November 2021
Bahrain	3	2	1	0	0	24 February 2022	24 February 2022
Belize	1	1	0	0	0	8 November 2021	8 November 2021
Bermuda	9	7	1	0	1	5 August 2008	5 August 2008
Cayman Islands	9	9	0	0	0	18 August 2019	18 August 2019
Germany	1	1	0	0	0	22 February 2022	22 February 2022
Hong Kong	1	0	1	0	0	24 October 2019	
Jersey	1	1	0	0	0	20 October 2019	20 October 2019
Kenya	5	1	4	0	0	3 August 2008	15 March 2013
Namibia	3	0	3	0	0	19 March 2025	
Nepal	3	2	1	0	0	21 February 2022	28 September 2024
Netherlands	5	2	3	0	0	2 August 2008	2 August 2008
Nigeria	1	1	0	0	0	21 October 2019	21 October 2019
Oman	7	4	3	0	0	25 October 2019	16 November 2022
Panama	2	2	0	0	0	14 November 2021	14 November 2021
Philippines	1	1	0	0	0	18 February 2022	18 February 2022
Saudi Arabia	2	2	0	0	0	15 November 2022	15 November 2022
Scotland	1	0	1	0	0	23 March 2012	
United Arab Emirates	2	0	2	0	0	27 October 2019	
United States	12	3	7	1	1	21 August 2019	21 August 2019

== Other records ==
=== ICC Trophy ===
- Highest team total: 356/5 v Papua New Guinea, 16 June 1986 at Walsall, England
- Highest individual score: 164 not out, Paul Prashad v Papua New Guinea, 16 June 1986 at Walsall, England
- Best innings bowling: 7/21, B Singh v Namibia, 14 February 1994 at Nairobi Club Ground, Kenya

=== Other cricket ===
- Batting
  - Ray Nascimento 176 runs – Canada vs United States at Toronto Cricket, Skating and Curling Club Ground Toronto, 1963
  - Ken Trestrail 175 runs – Canada vs Combined Services at Chatham, England, 1954
  - Qaiser Ali 174 runs – Canada vs Netherlands at Pretoria, South Africa, 2006
  - John Davison 165 runs – Canada vs Bermuda at King City, Ontario, 2006
  - Paul Prashad 164 runs not out – Canada vs Papua New Guinea at (ICC Trophy) England, 1986
  - John Davison 131 runs – Canada vs Namibia at Pretoria, South Africa, 2009
- Bowling
  - Joel Bradbury 9 wkts for 6 – Canada vs United States at Toronto, Ontario, 1854
  - Brian Christen 9 wkts for 38 – Canada vs United States at Toronto, Ontario, 1952
  - John Davison 9 wkts for 76 – Canada vs United States at Fort Lauderdale, Florida, 2004
  - Edward Ogden 9 wkts for 83 – Canada vs MCC at Lord's, England, 1887
  - Edward Ogden 8 wkts for 27 – Canada vs Warwickshire at Birmingham, England, 1887

== See also ==
- Cricket Canada
- Sports in Canada
- Canadian women's cricket team
- Scotiabank National T20 Championship
- Canadian national cricket captains
- List of Canadian first-class cricketers
- List of Canada ODI cricketers
- List of Canada Twenty20 International cricketers
