= Narendra Ekanayake =

Sri Lankan born Bahamian cricketer

Personal information
- Full name: Narendra Harshanaath Ekanayake
- Born: 8 November 1977 (age 49); Sri Lanka
- Batting: Left-handed
- Bowling: Slow left-arm orthodox

International information
- National side: Bahamas
- T20I debut (cap 21): 26 February 2023 v Bermuda
- Last T20I: 4 March 2023 v Bermuda

Umpiring information
- T20Is umpired: 3 (2025)

Career statistics
Competition	T20
Matches	2
Runs scored	9
Batting average	4.50
100s/50s	–/–
Top score	7
Balls bowled	48
Wickets	1
Bowling average	70.00
5 wickets in innings	–
10 wickets in match	–
Best bowling	1/36
Catches/stumpings	–/–
- Source: Cricinfo, 5 March 2023

Narendra Harshanaath Ekanayake (born 8 November 1977) is a Sri Lankan born Bahamian cricketer. Ekanayake is a left-handed batsman who bowls slow left-arm orthodox and who currently represents the Bahamas national cricket team. Ekanayak is the former captain of the Bahamas national cricket team.

Ekanayake made his debut for the Bahamas in the 2004 Americas Affiliates Championship against the Turks and Caicos Islands.

Ekanayake made his Twenty20 debut for the Bahamas against the Cayman Islands in the 1st round of the 2006 Stanford 20/20. He failed to take a wicket in the match. Ekanayake played his second and final Twenty20 match to date for the Bahamas in the 1st round of the 2008 Stanford 20/20 against Jamaica, where he took the wicket of Xavier Marshall.

Ekanayake represented the Bahamas in the 2008 ICC World Cricket League Division Five and in the 2010 ICC Americas Championship Division 2. Ekanayake will represent the Bahamas in the 2010 ICC Americas Championship Division 1.

Ekanayake made his T20I debut against Cayman Islandsin ICC Men's T20 World Cup Americas Qualifier tournament.

== See also ==
- List of Twenty20 International cricket umpires
