= 2024 Scotland Tri-Nation Series =

Third tri-nation series round in 2024-26 WCL2

- Part of 2024–2026 Cricket World Cup League 2
- Date: 16–26 July 2024
- Location: Scotland
Teams
Namibia	Oman	Scotland
Captains
Gerhard Erasmus	Aqib Ilyas	Richie Berrington
Most runs
Gerhard Erasmus (160)	Aqib Ilyas (130)	Richie Berrington (194)
Most wickets
Ben Shikongo (5)	Bilal Khan (6)	Charlie Cassell (7)

The 2024 Scotland Tri-Nation Series was the third round of the 2024–2026 Cricket World Cup League 2 cricket tournament, which was held in Scotland in July 2024. The tri-nation series was contested by the men's national teams of Scotland, Namibia and Oman. The matches were played as One Day International (ODI) fixtures.

Originally scheduled for May 2024, the series was rescheduled to July due to unprecedented poor weather resulting in a delay in the preparation of the playing pitches. A one-off Twenty20 International (T20I) match between Scotland and Oman was scheduled to be held following the League 2 series in May. The T20I match was confirmed to be cancelled in Cricket Scotland's announcement of the series postponement in April 2024.

== Squads ==
Namibia	Oman	Scotland
Gerhard Erasmus (c); Hanro Badenhorst; Jan Balt; Jack Brassell; Jan Frylinck; Zane Green (wk); Junior Kariata; Handre Klazinge; Jean-Pierre Kotze (wk); Malan Kruger; Lo-handre Louwrens (wk); Michael van Lingen; Tangeni Lungameni; Ben Shikongo; Bernard Scholtz; JJ Smit	Aqib Ilyas (c); Pratik Athavale (wk); Fayyaz Butt; Khalid Kail; Kaleemullah; Ayaan Khan; Bilal Khan; Mehran Khan; Shoaib Khan; Zeeshan Maqsood; Jay Odedra; Kashyap Prajapati; Rafiullah; Samay Shrivastava; Karan Sonavale	Richie Berrington (c); Matthew Cross (wk); Brad Currie; Charlie Cassell; Jasper Davidson; Michael English; Chris Greaves; Jack Jarvis; Michael Leask; Gavin Main; Brandon McMullen; George Munsey; Safyaan Sharif; ~~Chris Sole~~; Charlie Tear (wk); Mark Watt

Charlie Cassell was added to the Scotland squad on 15 July 2024 in place of Chris Sole, who was unavailable for personal reasons.

== Tour matches ==
Ahead of the series, Oman played two 50-over warm-up games against Scotland A at Forthill.

=== 1st 50-over match ===
11 July 2024
11:00
Scorecard

Scotland A 385 (47.2 overs)	v	Oman; 103 (30.2 overs)
Ollie Hairs 255 (130); Zeeshan Maqsood 3/26 (5.2 overs)		Zeeshan Maqsood 30 (45); Adrian Neill 3/19 (6 overs)

Scotland A won by 282 runs
Forthill, Dundee

- Scotland A won the toss and elected to bat.

=== 2nd 50-over match ===
12 July 2024
11:00
Scorecard

Oman; 106 (24.2 overs)	v	Scotland A 107/2 (18.2 overs)
Ayaan Khan 29 (32); Charlie Cassell 3/22 (6.2 overs)		Liam Naylor 57* (47); Bilal Khan 1/19 (3 overs)

Scotland A won by 8 wickets
Forthill, Dundee
Umpires: William Ferguson (Sco) and Ryan Milne (Sco)

- Oman won the toss and elected to bat.

== Fixtures ==
=== 1st ODI ===
16 July 2024
11:00
Scorecard

Oman; 123 (38 overs)	v	Scotland; 99/2 (12.2 overs)
Zeeshan Maqsood 40* (84); Jasper Davidson 4/23 (8 overs)		George Munsey 47 (34); Kaleemullah 2/40 (6 overs)

No result
Forthill, Dundee
Umpires: Ryan Milne (Sco) and Martin Saggers (Eng)

- Scotland won the toss and elected to field.
- No further play was possible due to rain.
- This was the first men's ODI to be played at the venue.
- Jasper Davidson (Sco), Pratik Athavale, Khalid Kail and Mehran Khan (Oma) all made their ODI debuts.

=== 2nd ODI ===
18 July 2024
11:00
Scorecard

Oman; 233/8 (50 overs)	v	Namibia; 234/4 (47.5 overs)
Khalid Kail 51 (66); Ben Shikongo 4/29 (9 overs)		Jan Frylinck 73 (81); Bilal Khan 2/40 (9 overs)

Namibia won by 6 wickets
Forthill, Dundee
Umpires: David McLean (Sco) and Ryan Milne (Sco)
Player of the match: Jan Frylinck (Nam)

- Namibia won the toss and elected to field.
- Junior Kariata (Nam) made his ODI debut.

=== 3rd ODI ===
20 July 2024
11:00
Scorecard

Scotland; 290/9 (50 overs)	v	Namibia; 235/9 (44 overs)
George Munsey 91 (62); Bernard Scholtz 3/23 (10 overs)		Gerhard Erasmus 63 (51); Michael Leask 4/40 (9 overs)

Scotland won by 47 runs (DLS method)
Forthill, Dundee
Umpires: David McLean (Sco) and Martin Saggers (Eng)

- Namibia won the toss and elected to field.
- No further play was possible due to rain.
- Richie Berrington (Sco) scored his 3,000th run in ODIs.
- Michael van Lingen (Nam) scored his 1,000th run in ODIs.

=== 4th ODI ===
22 July 2024
11:00
Scorecard

Oman; 91 (21.4 overs)	v	Scotland; 95/2 (17.2 overs)
Pratik Athavale 34 (56); Charlie Cassell 7/21 (5.4 overs)		Brandon McMullen 37* (43); Fayyaz Butt 1/11 (4 overs)

Scotland won by 8 wickets
Forthill, Dundee
Umpires: Iain McDonald (Sco) and Martin Saggers (Eng)
Player of the match: Charlie Cassell (Sco)

- Scotland won the toss and elected to field.
- Charlie Cassell (Sco) and Karan Sonavale (Oma) both made their ODI debuts.
- Charlie Cassell (Sco) took his first five-wicket haul in ODIs, and also registered the best figures by any bowler on debut in men's ODIs.

=== 5th ODI ===
24 July 2024
11:00
Scorecard

Namibia; 196/9 (50 overs)	v	Oman; 197/6 (49.1 overs)
Malan Kruger 73 (90); Bilal Khan 3/50 (10 overs)		Aqib Ilyas 68 (129); Jack Brassell 2/49 (10 overs)

Oman won by 4 wickets
Forthill, Dundee
Umpires: Iain McDonald (Sco) and David McLean (Sco)
Player of the match: Aqib Ilyas (Oma)

- Oman won the toss and elected to field.
- Bilal Khan (Oma) became the fastest pace bowler to take 100 wickets in men's ODIs, in terms of matches played (49).

=== 6th ODI ===
26 July 2024
11:00
Scorecard

Scotland; 301/6 (50 overs)	v	Namibia; 163 (40.1 overs)
Michael English 107 (122); Shaun Fouché 3/60 (10 overs)		Gerhard Erasmus 53 (73); Brad Currie 3/25 (9 overs)

Scotland won by 138 runs
Forthill, Dundee
Umpires: David McLean (Sco) and Martin Saggers (Eng)
Player of the match: Michael English (Sco)

- Namibia won the toss and elected to field.
- Michael English (Sco) made his ODI debut, and became the 17th cricketer to score a century on debut in men's ODIs.
