= Australian cricket team in Scotland in 2024 =

International cricket tour

	Scotland	Australia
- Dates: 4 – 7 September 2024
Captains	Richie Berrington	Mitchell Marsh

Twenty20 International series
- Results: Australia won the 3-match series 3–0
Most runs	Brandon McMullen (134)	Josh Inglis (130)
Most wickets	Brad Currie (5)	Sean Abbott (6); Cameron Green (6)

The Australia cricket team toured Scotland in September 2024 to play the Scotland national cricket team. The tour consisted of three Twenty20 International (T20I) matches. This was the first ever T20I bilateral series between the two sides. Australia last toured Scotland in 2013.

Australia swept the series 3–0.

== Squads ==
Scotland	Australia
Richie Berrington (c); Charlie Cassell; Matthew Cross (wk); Brad Currie; Jasper Davidson; Chris Greaves; Oli Hairs; Jack Jarvis; Michael Jones; Michael Leask; Brandon McMullen; George Munsey; Safyaan Sharif; Chris Sole; Charlie Tear (wk); Mark Watt; Brad Wheal	Mitchell Marsh (c); Sean Abbott; Xavier Bartlett; Cooper Connolly; Tim David; ~~Nathan Ellis~~; Jake Fraser-McGurk; Cameron Green; Aaron Hardie; ~~Josh Hazlewood~~; Travis Head; Josh Inglis (wk); ~~Spencer Johnson~~; Riley Meredith; Marcus Stoinis; Adam Zampa

On 15 August 2024, Spencer Johnson was ruled out of the series with a side-strain, Sean Abbott was named as his replacement. On 24 August 2024, Josh Hazlewood was ruled out of the series with a calf strain, Riley Meredith was named as his replacement. On 6 September 2024, Nathan Ellis was ruled out of the series due to hamstring injury.

== T20I series ==
=== 1st T20I ===
4 September 2024
14:00
Scorecard

Scotland; 154/9 (20 overs)	v	Australia; 156/3 (9.4 overs)
George Munsey 28 (16); Sean Abbott 3/39 (4 overs)		Travis Head 80 (25); Mark Watt 2/13 (2 overs)

Australia won by 7 wickets
The Grange Club, Edinburgh
Umpires: Iain McDonald (Sco) and David McLean (Sco)
Player of the match: Travis Head (Aus)

- Australia won the toss and elected to field.
- Charlie Cassell, Jasper Davidson (Sco) and Jake Fraser-McGurk (Aus) all made their T20I debuts.
- Australia broke the record held by South Africa (102) for most runs scored in the powerplay overs (113) in T20Is.

=== 2nd T20I ===
6 September 2024
14:00
Scorecard

Australia; 196/4 (20 overs)	v	Scotland; 126 (16.4 overs)
Josh Inglis 103 (49); Brad Currie 3/37 (4 overs)		Brandon McMullen 59 (42); Marcus Stoinis 4/23 (3.4 overs)

Australia won by 70 runs
The Grange Club, Edinburgh
Umpires: Iain McDonald (Sco) and Ryan Milne (Sco)
Player of the match: Josh Inglis (Aus)

- Scotland won the toss and elected to field.
- Josh Inglis' 43-ball century was the fastest by an Australian in T20Is.

=== 3rd T20I ===
7 September 2024
14:00
Scorecard

Scotland; 149/9 (20 overs)	v	Australia; 153/4 (16.1 overs)
Brandon McMullen 56 (39); Cameron Green 3/35 (4 overs)		Cameron Green 62* (39); Brad Currie 2/20 (3 overs)

Australia won by 6 wickets
The Grange Club, Edinburgh
Umpires: David McLean (Sco) and Ryan Milne (Sco)
Player of the match: Cameron Green (Aus)

- Australia won the toss and elected to field.
- Cooper Connolly (Aus) made his T20I debut.
- Travis Head (Aus) scored his 1,000th run in T20Is.
