= Scottish cricket team in Zimbabwe in 2025 =

International cricket tour

	Zimbabwe A	Scotland
- Dates: 24 – 28 April 2025
Captains	Roy Kaia	Matthew Cross

LA series
- Result: Scotland won the 3-match series 2–1
Most runs	Antum Naqvi (158)	Finlay McCreath (182)
Most wickets	Jasper Davidson (8)	Brad Evans (4)
- Player of the series: Finlay McCreath (Sco)

The Scotland national cricket team toured Zimbabwe in April 2025 to play three List A matches against the Zimbabwe A cricket team. In March 2025, Zimbabwe Cricket (ZC) confirmed the fixtures for the tour, with the matches taking place at Harare.

== Squads ==
Zimbabwe A	Scotland
Roy Kaia (c); Faraz Akram; Kian Blignaut; Brad Evans; Alex Falao; Luke Jongwe; Takudzwanashe Kaitano; Clive Madande (wk); Ernest Masuku; Timycen Maruma; Tadiwanashe Marumani (wk); Tony Munyonga; Dion Myers; Antum Naqvi; Brandon Senzere	Matthew Cross (c, wk); Richie Berrington; Charlie Cassell; Brad Currie; Jasper Davidson; Owen Gould; Chris Greaves; Jack Jarvis; Michael Leask; Christopher McBride; Finlay McCreath; Brandon McMullen; George Munsey; Safyaan Sharif; Mark Watt

== Tour matches ==
Before the List A series against Zimbabwe A, Scotland are playing two Twenty20 matches and one 50-overs match against the Zimbabwe Academy at the Takashinga Cricket Club ground.

=== T20 series ===
==== 1st T20 ====
19 April 2025
09:00
Scorecard

Zimbabwe Academy; 105/6 (19 overs)	v	Scotland; 106/3 (15 overs)
Ronak Patel 19 (26); Olly Davidson 2/11 (4 overs)		Matthew Cross 32* (37); Michael Blignaut 1/17 (2 overs)

Scotland won by 7 wickets
Takashinga Cricket Club, Harare
Umpires: Tafadzwa Musakwa (Zim) and David Shawane (Zim)
Player of the match: Brandon McMullen (Sco)

- Scotland won the toss and elected to field.
- The match was reduced to 19 overs per side due to rain.

==== 2nd T20 ====
19 April 2025
13:30
Scorecard

Scotland; 194/5 (20 overs)	v	Zimbabwe Academy; 127/9 (20 overs)
Matthew Cross 77 (47); Munashe Zata 2/56 (4 overs)		Lennox Chando 37 (37); Chris Greaves 2/17 (3 overs)

Scotland won by 67 runs
Takashinga Cricket Club, Harare
Umpires: David Shawane (Zim) and Oscar Tafirenyika (Zim)
Player of the match: Mark Watt (Sco)

- Scotland won the toss and elected to bat.

=== Only 50-over match ===
22 April 2025
09:00
Scorecard

Zimbabwe Academy; 141 (35 overs)	v	Scotland; 143/5 (26 overs)
Ryan Kamwemba 57 (88); Chris Greaves 4/22 (5 overs)		Finlay McCreath 35* (44); Brandon Senzere 4/41 (8 overs)

Scotland won by 5 wickets
Harare Sports Club, Harare
Umpires: Tafadzwa Musakwa (Zim) and Oscar Tafirenyika (Zim)

- Scotland won the toss and elected to field.

== List A series ==
=== 1st Unofficial ODI ===
24 April 2025
09:30
Scorecard

Zimbabwe A 240 (49 overs)	v	Scotland; 241/6 (43.2 overs)
Takudzwanashe Kaitano 72 (102); Michael Leask 3/33 (7 overs)		Finlay McCreath 100 (110); Roy Kaia 2/36 (9 overs)

Scotland won by 4 wickets
Harare Sports Club, Harare
Umpires: Iknow Chabi (Zim) and Langton Rusere (Zim)
Player of the match: Finlay McCreath (Sco)

- Scotland won the toss and elected to field.
- Brandon Senzere (Zimbabwe A) and Finlay McCreath (Sco) both made their List A debuts.
- Mark Watt (Sco) played his 100th List A match.
- Finlay McCreath (Sco) scored his maiden century in List A cricket.

=== 2nd Unofficial ODI ===
26 April 2025
09:30
Scorecard

Scotland; 347 (50 overs)	v	Zimbabwe A 340 (49 overs)
Brandon McMullen 115 (80); Brad Evans 4/67 (10 overs)		Antum Naqvi 158 (110); Jasper Davidson 7/75 (9 overs)

Scotland won by 7 runs
Harare Sports Club, Harare
Umpires: Forster Mutizwa (Zim) and Percival Sizara (Zim)
Player of the match: Jasper Davidson (Sco)

- Scotland won the toss and elected to bat.
- Kian Blignaut (Zimbabwe A) made his List A debut.
- Brandon McMullen (Sco) scored his 1,000th run in List A cricket.

=== 3rd Unofficial ODI ===
28 April 2025
09:30
Scorecard

Scotland; 85 (20.3 overs)	v	Zimbabwe A 86/2 (17.3 overs)
Michael Leask 29 (35); Ernest Masuku 7/35 (9 overs)		Takudzwanashe Kaitano 42 (53); Christopher McBride 1/8 (2 overs)

Zimbabwe A won by 8 wickets
Harare Sports Club, Harare
Umpires: Iknow Chabi (Zim) and Percival Sizara (Zim)
Player of the match: Ernest Masuku (Zimbabwe A)

- Zimbabwe A won the toss and elected to field.
- Kupakwashe Muradzi (Zimbabwe A) and Owen Gould (Sco) both made their List A debuts.
- Jack Jarvis (Sco) took his 50th wicket in List A cricket.
