= Finlay McCreath =

Scottish cricketer (born 1998)

Personal information
- Full name: Finlay David William McCreath
- Born: 16 October 1998 (age 28); Melrose, Scotland
- Batting: Right-handed
- Bowling: Right-arm medium-fast
- Role: Batter

International information
- National side: Scotland
- ODI debut (cap 85): 4 May 2025 v United Arab Emirates
- Last ODI: 13 August 2026 v Canada
- T20I debut (cap 63): 15 June 2025 v Netherlands
- Last T20I: 18 April 2026 v Namibia

Career statistics
Competition	ODI	T20I	LA	T20
Matches	20	7	22	8
Runs scored	561	94	743	94
Batting average	33.00	13.42	39.10	13.42
100s/50s	1/3	0/0	2/4	0/0
Top score	112	40	112	40
Catches/stumpings	11/–	5/–	13/–	6/–
- Source: Cricinfo, 25 September 2026

Finlay David William McCreath (born 16 October 1998) is a Scottish cricketer who has represented his country internationally.

== Career ==
McCreath represented Scotland at under 15, 17 and 19 levels. He made his debut for Scotland A in 2018 and a year later played four matches for Gloucestershire County Cricket Club second XI.

On 24 April 2025, McCreath made his List A debut for Scotland A against Zimbabwe A in the first of a three match series at the Harare Sports Club. Batting at number four, he scored 100 off 110 balls to help his team to a four-wicket win.

McCreath received his first call-up to the full Scotland set-up when he was named in the 15 player squad for the ICC Men's Cricket World Cup League 2 in the Netherlands in May 2025. He made his One Day International (ODI) debut in the opening match of the competition against the United Arab Emirates on 4 May 2025, scoring 35 in his maiden innings.

On 2 June 2025, McCreath made his first ODI half-century, scoring 55 against Nepal at Forthill. Four days later he top-scored for Scotland with 81 off 106 balls as they defeated the Netherlands at the same venue.

McCreath made his T20I debut for Scotland against the Netherlands at Titwood on 15 June 2025 and was named player of the match after scoring 40 off 28 balls in 39-run victory.

He was named in the Scotland squad for the 2025 Men's T20 World Cup Europe Regional Final.

McCreath was part of the Scotland squad for the 2026 Men's T20 World Cup. He was also selected in the Scottish squad for the Cricket World Cup League 2 tri-series in Nepal in May 2026, and top scored with 77 in their win over the United States.

Opening the batting, McCreath made his maiden ODI century against Canada at Forthill on 7 August 2026, scoring 112 off 140 balls including hitting two 6s and nine 4s.
