= List of cricket grounds in Scotland =

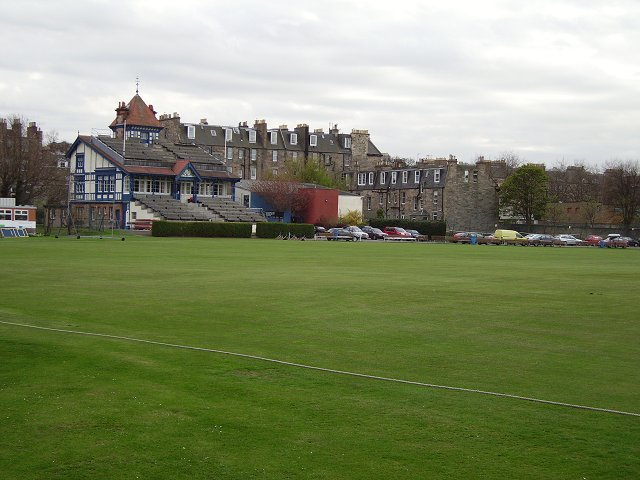
The Grange in Edinburgh has hosted eight One Day Internationals, 24 first-class matches and 65 List A matches

This is a list of cricket grounds in Scotland. Cricket reached Scotland in the 18th century, with the first recorded cricket match in Scotland taking place in Alloa in 1785. But it was another 80 years before Scotland played their first full match, against Surrey in 1865, which they won by 172 runs. Cricket continued to grow in Scotland, but never reached the participation and popularity levels that the game had in England. first-class matches and List A matches were played in Scotland during the 20th century; Scotland was a host venue for the 1999 Cricket World Cup, and One Day Internationals were played. Today Scotland still has One Day International status.

== List of grounds ==
The grounds included in this list have held at least one first-class or List A matches. Additionally, some of the List A matches have come in the form of One Day Internationals. A single ground has hosted a Women's One Day International.

† = Defunct venue

Official name (known as)	City or town	Capacity	Matches held	Ref
Boghall Cricket Club Ground	Linlithgow	Unknown	Three first-class matches and three List A matches	
Bothwell Castle Cricket Ground	Uddingston	Unknown	Two List A matches	
Cambusdoon†	Ayr	Unknown	Two first-class matches, one in 1958 and one in 1974. Now defunct as a cricket venue	
Cambusdoon New Ground	Ayr	Unknown	Nine One Day Internationals; three first-class matches	
Forthill		Dundee	Unknown	12 One Day Internationals; Six first-class matches
Hamilton Crescent	Glasgow	4,000	20 first-class matches and 10 List A matches	
Glenpark	Greenock	Unknown	Six first-class matches	
The Grange Club	Edinburgh	5,000	Eight One Day Internationals, 24 first-class matches and 65 List A matches	
Lochside Park	Forfar	Unknown	Six List A matches	
Langloan	Coatbridge	Unknown	Two first-class matches	
Mannofield Park	Aberdeen	6,000	Eight One Day Internationals, ten first-class matches and fourteen List A matches	
Mossilee	Galashiels	Unknown	One first-class match between Scotland and the touring Indians in 1911	
Myreside Cricket Ground	Edinburgh	Unknown	Two first-class matches and six List A matches	
New Williamfield	Stirling	Unknown	One Women's One Day International between Ireland and the Netherlands in 2010	
North Inch	Perth	Unknown	Six first-class matches and four List A matches	
Nunholm	Dumfries	Unknown	One first-class match between Scotland and Ireland in 1988	
Philiphaugh	Selkirk	Unknown	Two first-class matches, in 1963 and in 1971	
Shawholm†	Glasgow	Unknown	Three first-class matches	
Titwood	Glasgow	5,000	Four One Day Internationals, four first-class matches and sixteen List A matches	
Whitehaugh Oval	Paisley	Unknown	Six first-class matches	
