= List of centuries scored on One Day International cricket debut =

A cricketer scoring a century (100 runs or more) on their One Day International (ODIs) debut is regarded by critics as a significant achievement. As of September 2026, 20 players from 11 different international teams have accomplished this feat. Players representing nine of the twelve teams that have full member status have scored an ODI century on debut.

England's Dennis Amiss was the first debutant to score a century in ODIs; he scored 103 runs off 134 balls against Australia during the first match of the Prudential Trophy in 1972. (Note: In the second ODI ever played, Amiss became the first player to score a century in the format.) His total was surpassed by Desmond Haynes of West Indies when he made 148 against Australia in 1978. In a 1992 World Cup game against Sri Lanka, Andy Flower made 115 not out while making his first ODI appearance, representing Zimbabwe. It remains the only World Cup century by a debutant as of the 2023 tournament. In September 1995, Pakistan's Saleem Elahi set a record for becoming the youngest player to achieve the feat; aged 18, he was yet to play first-class cricket then. Between 1972 and 1995 only four players had scored a century on their ODI debut. However, since 2009, 16 players have achieved the feat. West Indian Amir Jangoo holds the record of fastest century by a batsman on ODI debut (79 balls). South African batters Matthew Breetzke and Jordan Hermann jointly hold the record of the highest individual score by a debutant, with Breetzke making 150 against New Zealand in 2025 and Hermann also scoring 150 against Namibia in 2026. Of the 20 occasions a cricketer has scored a century on ODI debut, their team has lost only 4 times. (Note: The match involving Martin Guptill (New Zealand) had no result.)

== Key ==
Key for the centuries table
Symbol	Meaning
Runs	Number of runs scored
*	Batsman remained not out
†	Batsman was awarded the man of the match title
S/R	Strike rate of the batsman (runs scored per 100 balls)
Inn.	Innings of the match in which the batsman scored his century
No result	The match had no result

== One Day International centuries on debut ==
One Day International centuries on debut
No.	Batsman	Runs	S/R	Inn.	For	Against	Venue	Date	Result
1	Dennis Amiss †	103	76.86	2	England	Australia	Old Trafford, Manchester, England	24 August 1972	Won
2	Desmond Haynes †	148	108.82	2	West Indies	Australia	Antigua Recreation Ground, St. John's, Antigua and Barbuda	22 February 1978	Won
3	Andy Flower †	115*	75.65	1	Zimbabwe	Sri Lanka	Pukekura Park, New Plymouth, New Zealand	23 February 1992	Lost
4	Saleem Elahi †	102*	76.69	2	Pakistan	Sri Lanka	Jinnah Stadium, Gujranwala, Pakistan	29 September 1995	Won
5	Martin Guptill	122*	90.37	1	New Zealand	West Indies	Eden Park, Auckland, New Zealand	10 January 2009	No result
6	Colin Ingram †	124	98.41	1	South Africa	Zimbabwe	Chevrolet Park, Bloemfontein, South Africa	15 October 2010	Won
7	Rob Nicol †	108*	82.44	2	New Zealand	Zimbabwe	Harare Sports Club, Harare, Zimbabwe	20 October 2011	Won
8	Phillip Hughes †	112	86.82	1	Australia	Sri Lanka	Melbourne Cricket Ground, Melbourne, Australia	11 January 2013	Won
9	Michael Lumb	106	90.59	2	England	West Indies	Sir Vivian Richards Stadium, North Sound, Antigua and Barbuda	28 February 2014	Lost
10	Mark Chapman †	124*	106.89	1	Hong Kong	UAE	ICC Academy Ground, Dubai, UAE	16 November 2015	Won
11	KL Rahul †	100*	86.95	2	India	Zimbabwe	Harare Sports Club, Harare, Zimbabwe	11 June 2016	Won
12	Temba Bavuma †	113	91.86	1	South Africa	Ireland	Willowmoore Park, Benoni, South Africa	25 September 2016	Won
13	Imam-ul-Haq †	100	80.00	2	Pakistan	Sri Lanka	Sheikh Zayed Cricket Stadium, Abu Dhabi, UAE	18 October 2017	Won
14	Reeza Hendricks †	102	114.60	1	South Africa	Sri Lanka	Pallekele International Cricket Stadium, Kandy, Sri Lanka	5 August 2018	Won
15	Abid Ali	112	94.11	2	Pakistan	Australia	Dubai Cricket Stadium, Dubai, UAE	29 March 2019	Lost
16	Rahmanullah Gurbaz †	127	100.00	1	Afghanistan	Ireland	Sheikh Zayed Cricket Stadium, Abu Dhabi, UAE	21 January 2021	Won
17	Michael English †	107	87.70	1	Scotland	Namibia	Forthill, Dundee, Scotland	26 July 2024	Won
18	Amir Jangoo †	104*	125.30	2	West Indies	Bangladesh	Warner Park, Basseterre, St Kitt's and Nevis	13 December 2024	Won
19	Matthew Breetzke	150	101.35	1	South Africa	New Zealand	Gaddafi Stadium, Lahore, Pakistan	10 February 2025	Lost
20	Jordan Hermann	150	119.04	1	South Africa	Namibia	Namibia Cricket Ground, Windhoek, Namibia	9 September 2026	Won

== Bibliography ==
- Pal, Suvam (2015). The HarperCollins Book of World Cup Trivia. HarperCollins Publishers India. ISBN 978-93-5177-164-7.
