= Travis Head =

Australian cricketer (born 1993)

- Head in 2026

Personal information
- Full name: Travis Michael Head
- Born: 29 December 1993 (age 32); Adelaide, South Australia
- Height: 179 cm (5 ft 10 in)
- Batting: Left-handed
- Bowling: Right-arm off break
- Role: Batter

International information
- National side: Australia (2016–present)
- Test debut (cap 454): 7 October 2018 v Pakistan
- Last Test: 27 October 2026 v South Africa
- ODI debut (cap 213): 13 June 2016 v West Indies
- Last ODI: 30 September 2026 v South Africa
- ODI shirt no.: 62
- T20I debut (cap 82): 26 January 2016 v India
- Last T20I: 20 February 2026 v Oman
- T20I shirt no.: 62

Domestic team information
- Years: Team
- 2011/12–present: South Australia
- 2012/13–present: Adelaide Strikers
- 2016–2017: Royal Challengers Bangalore
- 2016: Yorkshire
- 2018: Worcestershire
- 2021: Sussex
- 2024–present: Sunrisers Hyderabad
- 2024: Washington Freedom

Career statistics
Competition	Test	ODI	T20I	FC
Matches	70	85	53	185
Runs scored	4,863	3,273	1,335	12,606
Batting average	42.65	43.64	28.40	40.27
100s/50s	13/20	8/18	0/6	28/65
Top score	175	154*	91	223
Balls bowled	1,079	1,215	36	6,703
Wickets	16	28	1	70
Bowling average	41.93	41.50	56.00	60.72
5 wickets in innings	0	0	0	0
10 wickets in match	0	0	0	0
Best bowling	4/10	4/28	1/16	4/10
Catches/stumpings	38/–	20/–	9/–	90/–
Medal record
Men's cricket
Representing Australia
ICC Cricket World Cup
Winner	2023 India
ICC World Test Championship
Winner	2021–2023
Runner-up	2023–2025
U19 World Cup
Runner-up	2012 Australia
- Source: ESPNCricInfo, 1 November 2026

Travis Michael Head (born 29 December 1993) is an Australian international cricketer who represents the Australia national cricket team in all formats and is the current Test vice-captain. Known for his high strike rate, Head is a left-handed batter and part-time right arm off-spin bowler. He is contracted to South Australia at the state level and the Adelaide Strikers for the Big Bash League. Head has served as both a co vice-captain and vice-captain in Tests in multiple stints. Head captained Australia in T20Is and served as vice-captain in ODIs in 2024.

Head was a key member of the Australian team that won the 2023 World Test Championship final and 2023 Cricket World Cup final, having been adjudged Player of the Match in both those finals. He also became the second player ever to score a century when batting second in a World Cup final. He also became the first player to score centuries in two consecutive ICC tournament finals in a same calendar year.

== Early career and domestic cricket ==
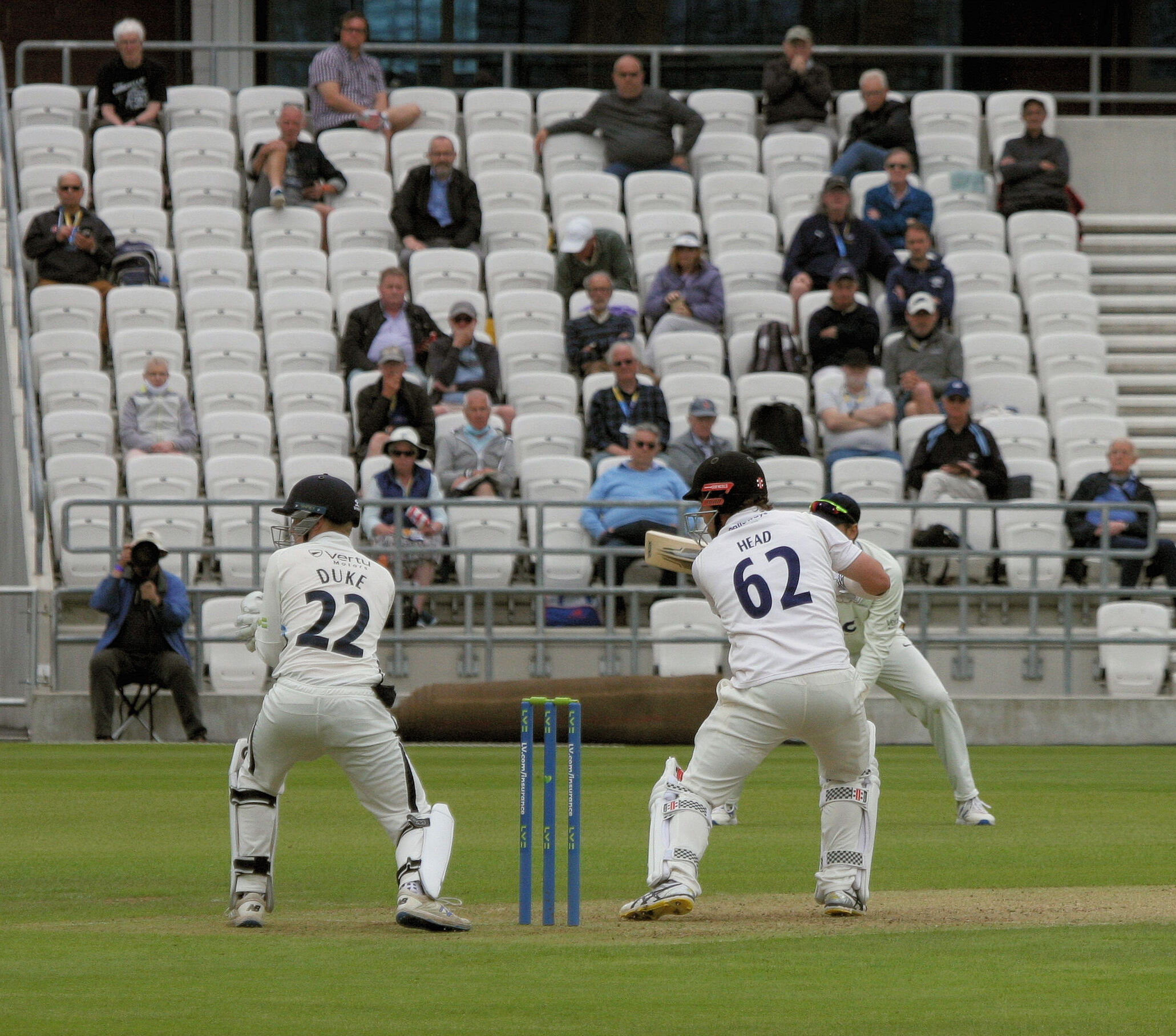
Head (shirt 62) batting for Sussex in 2021

Hailing from Craigmore in the northern suburbs of Adelaide, Head played at underage levels for the Craigmore Cricket Club and Trinity College, Head represented South Australia at both under-17 and under-19 level, making his debut in the National Under-19 Championships at the age of 17. After making his name playing grade cricket for Tea Tree Gully Cricket Club, Head made his first-class cricket debut for South Australia in the Sheffield Shield at the age of 18 in early 2012. He made a promising start to his career with three matches for South Australia, scoring his maiden half-century in his second match and falling short of scoring his maiden century in his third match with 90 runs against Tasmania. He was rewarded at the end of the season with a rookie contract with South Australia.

Head went on to play 18 under-19 One Day International (ODI) matches for the Australian national team, including at the 2012 Under-19 Cricket World Cup. He impressed with both bat and ball during the tournament, scoring 87 off 42 balls against Scotland and taking three wickets against Bangladesh in the quarter-final. He showed leadership qualities when he captained South Australia to victory in the 2012–13 National Under-19 Championships, being named Player of the Championship for the second consecutive year.

Head remained a regular selection for the 2012–13 season, usually batting in the middle order. He came close to scoring his maiden century with 95 against Western Australia. Though he was not dismissed, he ran out of batting partners and was stranded at the crease five runs short of the milestone. He subsequently played a single Twenty20 game for the Adelaide Strikers in the Big Bash League, replacing the injured Kieron Pollard in the team. Shortly after South Australia's Shield win against Victoria in January 2013, he was hit by a car outside a hotel in Adelaide, receiving injuries to his head and back, but he made a full recovery and was able to return for South Australia's next match. Head was one of six young Australian players to be part of the inaugural Ageas Bowl International Cricket Academy during the 2013 season, training at the ground's facilities.

In the early part of Head's career, he struggled to reach his maiden first-class century, instead finishing with scores in the nineties on multiple occasions. After his score of 90 in his debut season and his unbeaten 95 against Western Australia in 2012, he made it to the nineties three times in the 2013–14 Sheffield Shield season, against Western Australia twice more and once against Tasmania with scores of 92, 98 and 98 respectively. Despite this he was able to score a List A century for the National Performance Squad against South Africa A in July 2014.

In February 2015, Head was named to replace Johan Botha as the captain of South Australia, though Botha stayed with the team for the rest of the season to assist with the transition. At the age of 21 he was the youngest captain of the South Australian team in their 122-year first-class history. As captain his fortunes continued to improve in the 2015–16 season as he shone in all three formats of the game. At the beginning of the season he became the third Australian in history to score a double century in a List A match with 202 runs from 120 balls. In doing so he helped South Australia to chase down the large target of 351 with three overs to spare. He also finally scored his maiden first-class century, after 17 scores of 50 or more, in a Sheffield Shield match against Western Australia to lead South Australia to a thrilling one-wicket win. On New Year's Eve he scored his maiden Twenty20 century against the Sydney Sixers, the first century ever scored for the Strikers. With three overs left in the match, the Strikers needed 51 runs to win and Head needed 55 runs to score his century. Head then scored 56 runs in the final three overs to score his century and win the match with three balls to spare, hitting Sean Abbott for three consecutive sixes in the last over. His final score was 101 runs off 53 balls with 9 sixes and 4 fours.

Head started the 2017–18 Sheffield Shield season as one of many players in contention to take Australia's number 6 spot in the upcoming Ashes against England. In the first match of the season the Redbacks played against New South Wales, whose bowling attack made up the entire Australian bowling attack. Head did not impress selectors, only scoring totals of 8 and 0, but he bounced back with an impressive, measured half-century against Victoria and a century against Queensland. Regardless, he did not earn selection in Australia's Test team.

When Brad Hodge left the Adelaide Strikers, Head replaced him as the team's captain, adding it to his captaincy of South Australia and making him the captain of the state's highest-level team in all three formats of the game.

=== List A cricket (2021) ===
In October 2021, Head made his second double century (230 off 127 deliveries), against Queensland in Adelaide, becoming the third batsman to score more than one double century in List A cricket.

== International career (2016–present) ==
=== Limited-overs career ===
==== Early international career (2015–2016) ====
Head's domestic form was rewarded by national selectors when he was included in Australia's squad for a series of Twenty20 Internationals against India. He made his international debut during the series on Australia Day at his home ground, the Adelaide Oval. After the series he returned to the Sheffield Shield, scoring two more centuries, one against Western Australia to secure another one-wicket win and the other against Tasmania, scoring a career-best 192 to help give South Australia an innings victory in just two days. He led South Australia to their first Sheffield Shield final in 20 years and was named the Sheffield Shield Player of the Year, having scored 699 runs at an average of 38.83 before the final, which South Australia lost.

Head was brought into Australia's One Day International (ODI) squad for the first time for a tri-series in the West Indies. He made his ODI debut on 13 June 2016 against the West Indies. After the tournament he joined the IPL team Royal Challengers Bangalore before going to England to play County cricket for Yorkshire. In his fourth match for Yorkshire he broke the club's record for the highest List A batting partnership, putting on 274 runs for the third wicket with Jack Leaning. Head scored 175 off 139 balls in the innings while Leaning also scored a century. He had to leave Yorkshire early when he was brought to Sri Lanka to train with Australia's Test squad and play in their ODI squad. Though he was originally not included in the squad, the selectors decided that they needed to give younger players more experience in Asian conditions after they had lost the first two matches of the Test series.

==== Opening stint and Champions Trophy (2016–2017) ====
As Head was part of Australia's squad for their tour of South Africa, he was unable to captain the Redbacks in the Matador Cup. He continued to play for Australia consistently in the 2016–17 season, but he was unable to make any big scores. Batting in the middle order, he regularly scored above 30 runs, doing so nine times in fourteen innings before the end of 2016, but he was only able to score three half-centuries with a high score of 57 against New Zealand. For Australia's series against Pakistan in January 2017, Head was moved from the middle order to the top order, opening the batting. This resulted in Head scoring his maiden ODI century against Pakistan on Australia Day at Adelaide Oval. He opened with David Warner and the pair scored 284 runs for the first wicket, with Head scoring 128 himself. This stands as the highest partnership for any wicket for Australia and the second highest opening stand in ODIs. Despite his strong form in One Day Internationals and in domestic cricket, averaging over 60 in the 2016–17 Sheffield Shield season, Head was not included in Australia's Test squad for the 2017 Border-Gavaskar Trophy. Instead, Head continued to play for South Australia, who played in their second consecutive Sheffield Shield final. He scored a century but the Redbacks ultimately lost the match.

When limited overs opener Aaron Finch returned to form, Head was dropped back to the middle order, though he remained in the Australian team for the 2017 ICC Champions Trophy. Due to weather, neither of Australia's first two matches in the tournament were completed and Head did not get a chance to bat, but in Australia's only completed match, against hosts England, Head top scored for Australia with 71* in a losing effort. Head signed to play for Yorkshire again in the 2017 NatWest t20 Blast, but he pulled out of the tournament when he was named the captain of the Australia A team for the 2017 South Africa A Team Tri-Series. As a result of a pay dispute with Cricket Australia, the Australia A team pulled out of this tournament.

==== Limited-overs return (2022–present) ====
In January 2022, Head was included in the 16-man squad to face Sri Lanka in a five-match T20I series; he last played white ball cricket for Australia in 2018. In February, Cricket Australia announced that Head would miss the start of the series to play in the Sheffield Shield, and would join the squad in Melbourne. He did not feature in any of the matches.

In February 2022, Head was included in the white-ball squad for the Pakistan tour. In the first ODI, his first since November 2018, he made his second century (101 off 72 deliveries) opening the batting, took two wickets and was named player of the match. He made 89 in the second ODI, but was dismissed for a golden duck in the final match. He made his T20I return in the one-off match.

Head was selected in the ODI and Australia A squads for the tour of Sri Lanka in June–July 2022. In the second unofficial ODI against Sri Lanka A, Head top-scored with 110 in a losing cause. He was picked for the ODIs after injuries to several Australian players; he played in the second, third (where he top scored with 70 not out), and fourth matches, but was ruled out of the final match with a hamstring strain.

After missing the home series against Zimbabwe and New Zealand due to paternity leave, Head was included in the ODI squad to face England in November 2022, replacing the now-retired Aaron Finch as opener. In the final ODI in Melbourne, Head scored his third century (152) and was awarded the player of the match award. Head and David Warner put on 269 runs, becoming the second pair to make two 250-run partnerships in ODIs, and joint fastest to score 1000 partnership runs.

Head was selected for the ODI series in India in March 2023. In the second ODI in Visakhapatnam, opening the batting with Mitchell Marsh, he scored a rapid unbeaten half-century, and put on an unbeaten partnership of 121 in 11 overs, as Australia cruised to victory by 10 wickets.

Head was picked for the limited overs series against South Africa. In the third T20I, Head scored his first T20I half-century (91), and was awarded the player of the match award. Head fractured his left hand after being struck on his hand attempting a pull shot off Gerald Coetzee during the fourth ODI of the series, and was forced to retire hurt, and also ruled out of the final ODI.

==== 2023 Cricket World Cup ====
Head was named in the Australian squad for the 2023 Cricket World Cup, but did not play in the tournament until Australia's match against New Zealand on 28 October, as he continued to recover from his injury. He scored his fourth ODI century (109 off 67 balls) in his first World Cup match, and won the player of the match award. His all-round performance in the semi-final helped Australia beat South Africa by 3 wickets in a close encounter and helped Australia book a place in the final. He took 2 important wickets and scored 62 runs off 48 balls in the semi-final. He was declared player of the match.

In the final against India, he scored 137 runs and was the player of the match, as Australia won by six wickets to lift its sixth World Cup title after chasing down the target of 241. Head put on a record breaking partnership of 192 runs with Marnus Labuschagne for the fourth wicket during the final, which is also the highest ever partnership by a pair in a World Cup final run chase. He broke several World Cup batting records in the process. He also became the first and only player to score two centuries in men's ICC tournament finals (in fact Head scored centuries in 2023 WTC final and 2023 Cricket World Cup with both centuries coming in single calendar year). He also surpassed Viv Richards record tally of 180 runs to become the most prolific runscorer in across the semi-final and final in a men's World Cup tournament with a tally of 199 runs. He also took a stunning diving catch in the World Cup final to dismiss Indian skipper Rohit Sharma, which helped precipitate India's dramatic slowdown in their batting approach in the final, as the dismissal of Rohit broke the early momentum India had in the first half of the batting in the final. Head also became the fourth player after Mohinder Amarnath, Aravinda de Silva and Shane Warne to receive player of the match awards in both the semi-final and the final, in the same World Cup campaign.

==== 2024 ICC Men's T20 World Cup and T20 dominance ====
In May 2024, he was named in Australia's squad for the 2024 ICC Men's T20 World Cup tournament. Head was the third highest run scorer of the tournament, scoring 255 runs from seven innings with two half-centuries.

In June 2024, Head became the highest ranked T20I batter, according to the ICC player rankings. In the first of a three-match T20I series against Scotland, Head equalled the record for the fastest fifty (held by Marcus Stoinis) for Australia in T20Is (17 balls), making 80 off 25 balls. He put on a rapid 113-run partnership with Mitchell Marsh and earned the player of the match award. In the third match, he became the second fastest Australian to score 1000 T20I runs (35 innings).

In the first T20I against England Head made a rapid half-century, including 30 runs in an over bowled by Sam Curran, earning the player of the match award. Head captained Australia for the first time in T20Is, in the second match in Cardiff, in the absence of an unwell Mitchell Marsh. In the first ODI, Head took two wickets and scored his sixth ODI century, a career best unbeaten 154, earning him the player of the match award. In the final ODI, Head took career-best figures of 4/28, and then made a brisk 31 to keep Australia ahead of the DLS score and guide his team to victory. His all-round performance earned him the player of the match award and he also won the player of the series award, scoring 248 runs and taking six wickets.

==== 2026 ICC Men's T20 World Cup ====
In January 2026, he was named in Australia's squad for the 2026 ICC Men's T20 World Cup tournament. He captained Australia for the first two T20s in the absence of captain Mitchell Marsh and played all four matches in their group stage exit.

=== Test cricket (2018–present) ===
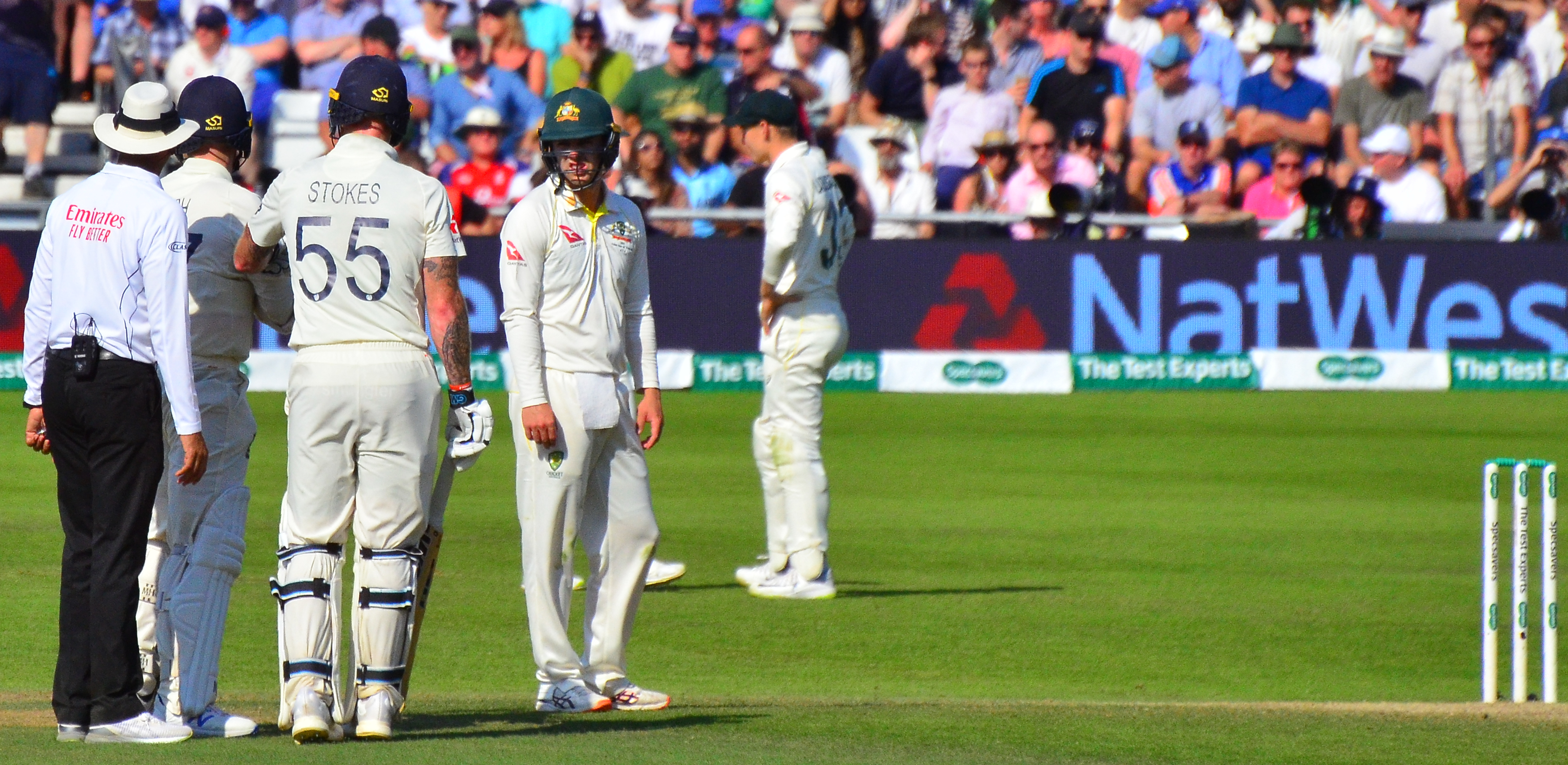
Head fielding during the third test of the 2019 Ashes.

In April 2018, Head was awarded a national contract by Cricket Australia for the 2018–19 season. In September 2018, he was named in Australia's Test squad for their series against Pakistan. He made his Test debut for Australia against Pakistan on 7 October 2018. He had his baggy green cap presented to him from Nathan Lyon.

In January 2019, Head was announced as Australia's new Test vice-captain, alongside Pat Cummins ahead of the series against Sri Lanka on 24 January. This was due to the unavailability of regular vice-captains, Mitchell Marsh who was omitted from the Test squad and Josh Hazlewood who was unavailable due to an injury. In the two-Test series, across three innings, Head scored 84, 161 (his maiden Test century), and 59 not out to raise his Test match batting average to 51.

In July 2019, Head was named in Australia's squad for the 2019 Ashes series in England. Head played in four Tests and scoring 191 runs at an average of 27.28, as Australia retained the Ashes with a 2-2 drawn series. In November 2019, Head played against Pakistan in Australia, although he only batted once in the series. In December 2019, he was named in Australia's squad for the Test Series against New Zealand. He scored 114 and was named player of the match in the second Test. On 16 July 2020, Head was named in a 26-man preliminary squad of players to begin training ahead of a possible limited-overs tour to England following the COVID-19 pandemic.

In November 2020, despite being named in a 17-man squad for the India's 2020-21 tour of Australia, Head was demoted as Australia's Test co vice-captain, with Pat Cummins to solely deputise Tim Paine. Head played in two Tests in the series, scoring an underwhelming 62 runs across three innings as Australia were defeated 2–1 by India.

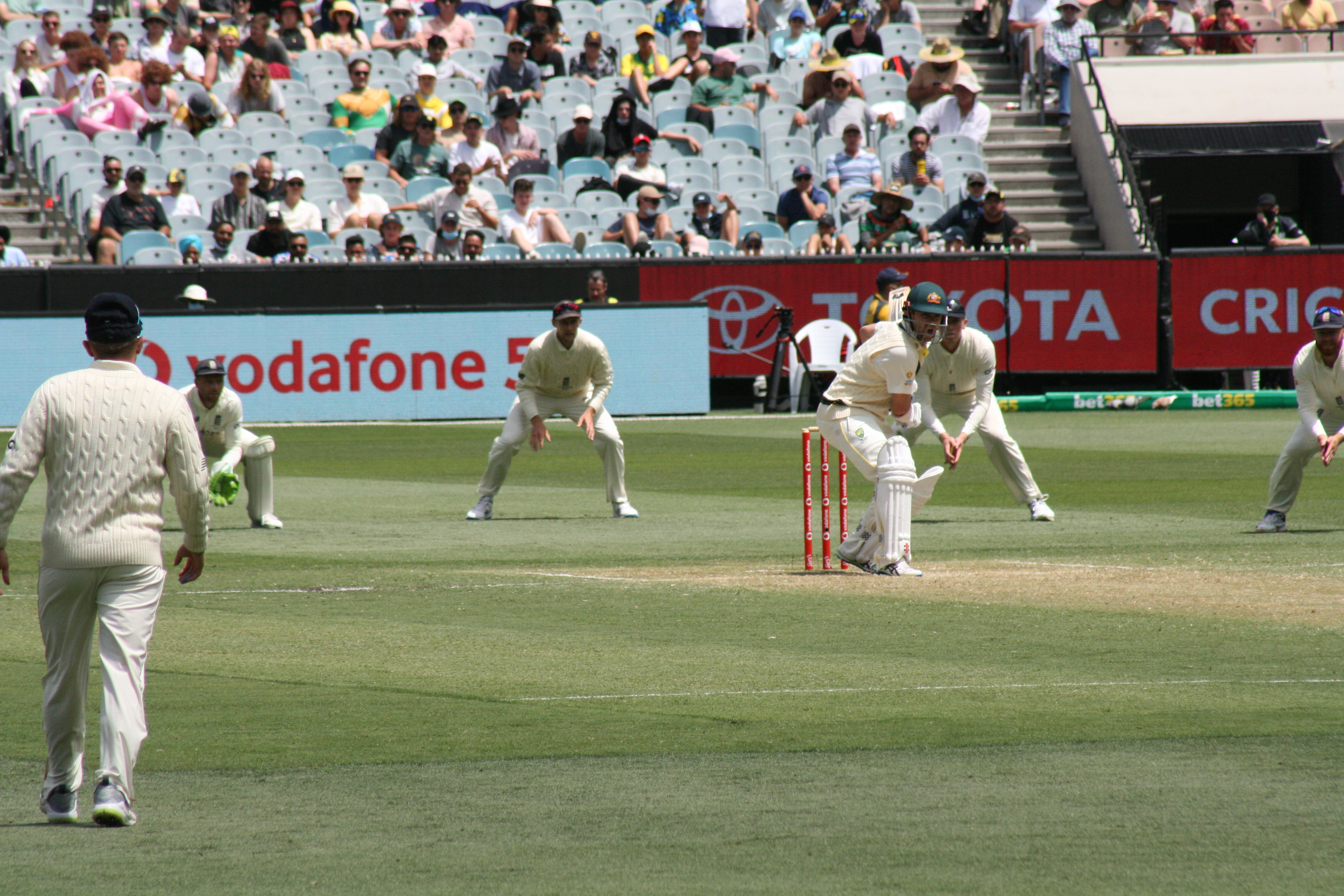
Head batting at the MCG during day 2 of the 2021 Boxing Day Test.

Head was included in the squad for the 2021–22 Ashes. In the first test at The Gabba, scored 152 to register his third Test century, and was named player of the match. During the first Test, Head was fined 15 per cent of his match fee and handed one demerit point by the ICC, after an audible obscenity was picked up by the stump microphone. Head was ruled out of the fourth test in Sydney after testing positive for COVID-19. He returned for the fifth test in Hobart, where he scored 101. He was named player of the match, and was also awarded the Compton–Miller Medal for player of the series, having scored 357 runs at an average of 59.50 for the series, as Australia defeated England 4–0.

In January 2022, Head was involved in a post-Ashes incident in Hobart. Following Australia's series victory, Tasmanian Police were called to a hotel at 6:00 am to disperse a noisy gathering on a terrace that included Head, Australian teammates and some England players and staff. Cricket Australia investigated the matter and concluded it without issuing any disciplinary sanctions.

In February 2022, Head was included in the 18-man squad to tour Pakistan in March, where he scored 68 runs at an average of 22.66, as Australia won the three-Test series 1–0. Head was included in the squad for the 2022 tour of Sri Lanka. In the first Test in Galle, he picked up career best figures of 4/10 – his first wickets in Tests – in the second innings, paving the way for a 10-wicket victory for Australia.

Head was included in the Australian squad for the series against the West Indies in 2022–23. In the first Test in Perth, he scored 99, putting on 196 runs for the fourth wicket with Steve Smith in the first innings. He took two wickets in the second innings, as Australia won by 164 runs. In the second Test in Adelaide, Head scored a career-best 175 in the first innings, putting on 297 runs for the fourth wicket with Marnus Labuschagne. He won the player of the match award. He was included in the Australian squad for the home series against South Africa in 2022–23. In the first Test, Head was the top scorer for Australia with 92 in the first innings, and he was named player of the match. He also completed 2000 runs in Tests. In the same week, Head moved to number four in the ICC rankings for Test batting.

Head was included in the 18-man squad for the 2022-23 Border-Gavaskar series. Head scored 235 runs during the series, at an average of 47.00, as Australia were defeated in the series 2–1. He was named in the squads for the 2023 ICC World Test Championship final and the 2023 Ashes. In the 2023 WTC final at The Oval, Head scored his first overseas Test century and sixth overall (163), putting on 285 runs with Steven Smith for the fifth wicket in the first innings. Australia won by 209 runs, and he was the player of the match. In June 2023, Head moved to number three in the ICC Test batting rankings. Following the conclusion of the third Ashes Test, Head moved to number two in the rankings. Head ended the Ashes series with 362 runs, including three half-centuries.

In January 2024, in the first Test against the West Indies in Adelaide, Head scored his seventh Test century (119), and won the player of the match award. He also completed 3000 runs in Tests.

During the 2024–25 Border-Gavaskar Trophy series against India, Head scored 448 runs at an average of 56, leading the series run-scoring for both teams. Head scored two centuries during the series, including 140 off 141 balls in the second Test at the Adelaide Oval. He then scored 152 in the third Test at the Gabba. During the series, Head was involved in two controversies that generated significant international media coverage. In the second Test, Head was involved in a heated on-field exchange with Indian fast bowler Mohammed Siraj. After Siraj bowled Head and delivered an aggressive send-off, Head reacted verbally, leading to a tense confrontation on the pitch. The ICC match referee found both players guilty of breaching the Code of Conduct and Head received an official reprimand and one demerit point for his retaliatory reaction. Later in the same series, during the Boxing Day Test at the Melbourne Cricket Ground, following his dismissal of Indian wicket-keeper Rishabh Pant, Head's wicket celebration sparked a social media response. The celebration, which was viewed as obscene by some observers, was later explained to be an internal joke within the Australian team. Australia went on to win the series 3–1.

2025/26 Ashes Series

During the 2025-26 Ashes, Head was the highest run-scorer in the series with 629 runs at an average of 62.90 across 10 innings. This included 3 centuries, the most of any batter as well.

While originally slated to bat at number five, Head opted to open the batting for Australia in the second innings of the first test after his teammate, Usman Khawaja suffered a back injury. Chasing 205, Head scored a 69-ball century, the second fastest Ashes century of all time.

Head's fast scoring opening the batting continued throughout the series. In Adelaide, Head brought up his second century whilst putting on a 162-run partnership with Alex Carey, the first pair of South Australian-born batsmen to put on a 100-run partnership since the 1890s.

In Sydney, Head scored 170 in the first innings. He became the 16th player in Ashes history to score more than 600 runs in a series. His strike rate of 87.59 was the most of any batsman with more than 600 runs in a series as well. Head has also scored the second most runs of any Australian opener in an Ashes series behind Mark Taylor.

== Indian Premier League ==
For the 2016 and 2017 Indian Premier League seasons, Head played for Royal Challengers Bangalore. Head played for Sunrisers Hyderabad in the 2024 season. He started the tournament with a 24-ball 62 against Mumbai Indians. On 15 April 2024, he scored a match-winning 102 from 41 balls against Royal Challengers Bengaluru. Throughout the tournament, he and Abhishek Sharma gave good starts to the team which made sure that they qualified for the final. He finished the tournament as the leading run-scorer for SRH with 567 runs.

Head was retained by the franchise for the 2025 and 2026 IPL.

=== 2026 IPL altercation and online abuse ===
During the 2026 Indian Premier League, Head was involved in a highly publicised on-field altercation with Royal Challengers Bengaluru player Virat Kohli on 22 May 2026. Following an exchange of verbal banter during a high-scoring run chase, the tension culminated during the customary post-match handshakes. Kohli notably refused to shake Head's extended hand and walked past him, an incident that drew widespread media attention and commentary.

In the days following the incident, Head and his family were subjected to online harassment. Supporters flooded the couple's social media accounts with derogatory comments, with his wife publicly comparing the intensity of the cyberbullying to the abuse they received after Australia defeated India in the 2023 Cricket World Cup final.

== Honours ==
=== Team ===
==== International ====
- World Test Championship: 2023
- Cricket World Cup: 2023

==== Domestic ====
- Sheffield Shield: 2023
- Big Bash League: 2017–18
- Major League Cricket: 2024

=== Individual ===
- Allan Border Medalist: 2025, 2026
- Australian Test Player of the Year: 2022
- Australian Domestic Player of the Year: 2022
- Australian Men's One Day International Player of the Year: 2025
- ICC Men's T20I Team of the Year: 2024
- ICC Men's ODI Team of the Year: 2022, 2023
- ICC Men's Test Team of the Year: 2023
- ICC Men's Player of the Month: November 2023
- Sheffield Shield Player of the Year: 2015–16

== Personal life ==
Head married Jessica Davies in April 2023. Their first child, a daughter, was born in September 2022. The couple's second child, a son, was born in November 2024.

Head is a supporter of the Port Adelaide Football Club in the Australian Football League.

== List of international centuries ==
As of October 2026, Head has scored 13 centuries (100 or more runs in a single innings) in Tests and 8 in ODIs. His highest Test score of 175 came against West Indies in December 2022. His highest ODI score of 154 not out came against England in September 2024.

Key
Symbol	Meaning
*	Remained not out
†	Man of the match
Match	Matches played
Pos.	Position in the batting order
Inn.	The innings of the match
Test	The number of the Test match played in that series
S/R	Strike rate during the innings
H/A/N	Venue was at home (Australia), away or neutral
Date	Date the match was held, or the starting date of match for Test matches
Lost	The match was lost by Australia
Won	The match was won by Australia
Drawn	The match was drawn

Test centuries
No.	Score	Against	Pos.	Inn.	Test	Venue	H/A/N	Date	Result	Ref
1	161	Sri Lanka	5	1	2/2	Manuka Oval, Canberra	Home	1 February 2019	Won	
2	114†	New Zealand	6	1	2/3	Melbourne Cricket Ground, Melbourne	Home	26 December 2019	Won	
3	152†	England	5	2	1/5	The Gabba, Brisbane	Home	8 December 2021	Won	
4	101†	England	5	1	5/5	Bellerive Oval, Hobart	Home	14 January 2022	Won	
5	175†	West Indies	5	1	2/2	Adelaide Oval, Adelaide	Home	8 December 2022	Won	
6	163†	India	5	1	1/1	The Oval, Kennington	Neutral	7 June 2023	Won	
7	119†	West Indies	5	2	1/2	Adelaide Oval, Adelaide	Home	17 January 2024	Won	
8	140†	India	5	2	2/5	Adelaide Oval, Adelaide	Home	6 December 2024	Won	
9	152†	India	5	1	3/5	The Gabba, Brisbane	Home	14 December 2024	Drawn	
10	123	England	1	4	1/5	Perth Stadium, Perth	Home	21 November 2025	Won	
11	170	England	1	3	3/5	Adelaide Oval, Adelaide	Home	19 December 2025	Won	
12	163†	England	1	2	5/5	Sydney Cricket Ground, Sydney	Home	4 January 2026	Won	
13	121	South Africa	2	3	2/3	St George's Park Cricket Ground, Gqeberha	Away	18 October 2026	Lost	

ODI centuries
No.	Score	Against	Pos.	Inn.	S/R	Venue	H/A/N	Date	Result	Ref
1	128	Pakistan	2	1	93.43	Adelaide Oval, Adelaide	Home	26 January 2017	Won	
2	101†	Pakistan	1	1	140.27	Gaddafi Stadium, Lahore	Away	29 March 2022	Won	
3	152†	England	1	1	116.92	Melbourne Cricket Ground, Melbourne	Home	22 November 2022	Won	
4	109†	New Zealand	2	1	162.68	HPCA Stadium, Dharamshala	Neutral	28 October 2023	Won	
5	137†	India	2	2	114.16	Narendra Modi Stadium, Ahmedabad	Away	19 November 2023	Won	
6	154* †	England	2	2	119.37	Trent Bridge, Nottingham	Away	19 September 2024	Won	
7	142 †	South Africa	1	1	137.86	Great Barrier Reef Arena, Mackay	Home	24 August 2025	Won	
8	112 †	Zimbabwe	1	1	133.33	Harare Sports Club, Harare	Away	18 September 2026	Won	
