= Michael English (cricketer) =

Scottish cricketer (born 1995)

Personal information
- Full name: Michael Miller English
- Born: 2 May 1995 (age 31); Paisley, Scotland
- Batting: Right-handed
- Bowling: Right-arm medium
- Role: Top order batter

International information
- National side: Scotland (2024–present)
- ODI debut (cap 84): 27 July 2024 v Namibia
- Last ODI: 13 August 2026 v Canada

Career statistics
Competition	ODI
Matches	6
Runs scored	230
Batting average	46.00
100s/50s	1/1
Top score	107
Catches/stumpings	2/–
- Source: CricketArchive, 15 August 2026

Michael Miller English (born 2 May 1995) is a Scottish cricketer who currently plays for Scotland. He plays as a top order right-handed batter. He made his international debut for Scotland in 2024.

== International career ==
On 7 July 2024, he earned his maiden call-up for the national team for the 2024 Scotland Tri-Nation Series, which formed part of the 2024–2026 Cricket World Cup League 2. English made his One Day International (ODI) debut against Namibia in the same series, on 26 July 2024. Opening the batting, he scored 107 off 122 balls. This made him the 17th batsman to score a century on their ODI debut.
