= 2023 World Test Championship final =

Cricket match

2023 ICC World Test Championship final
- Event: 2021–2023 ICC World Test Championship
Australia	India
(Australia)	(India)
469	296
&	&
270/8d	234
- Australia won by 209 runs
- Date: 7–11 June 2023
- Venue: The Oval, London
- Player of the match: Travis Head (Aus)
- Umpires: Chris Gaffaney (NZ); Richard Illingworth (Eng)

The final of the 2021–2023 ICC World Test Championship, a Test cricket match, was played from 7 to 11 June 2023 at The Oval, London, between Australia and India. Australia won the match by 209 runs to win the second edition of the ICC World Test Championship. This marked Australia's maiden win of the Championship. As winners, they received a cash prize of US$1.6 million, while the Indian team received a cash prize of US$800,000. The victory in the final established Australia as the first team to have won all ICC tournaments across all three cricket formats.

== Background ==
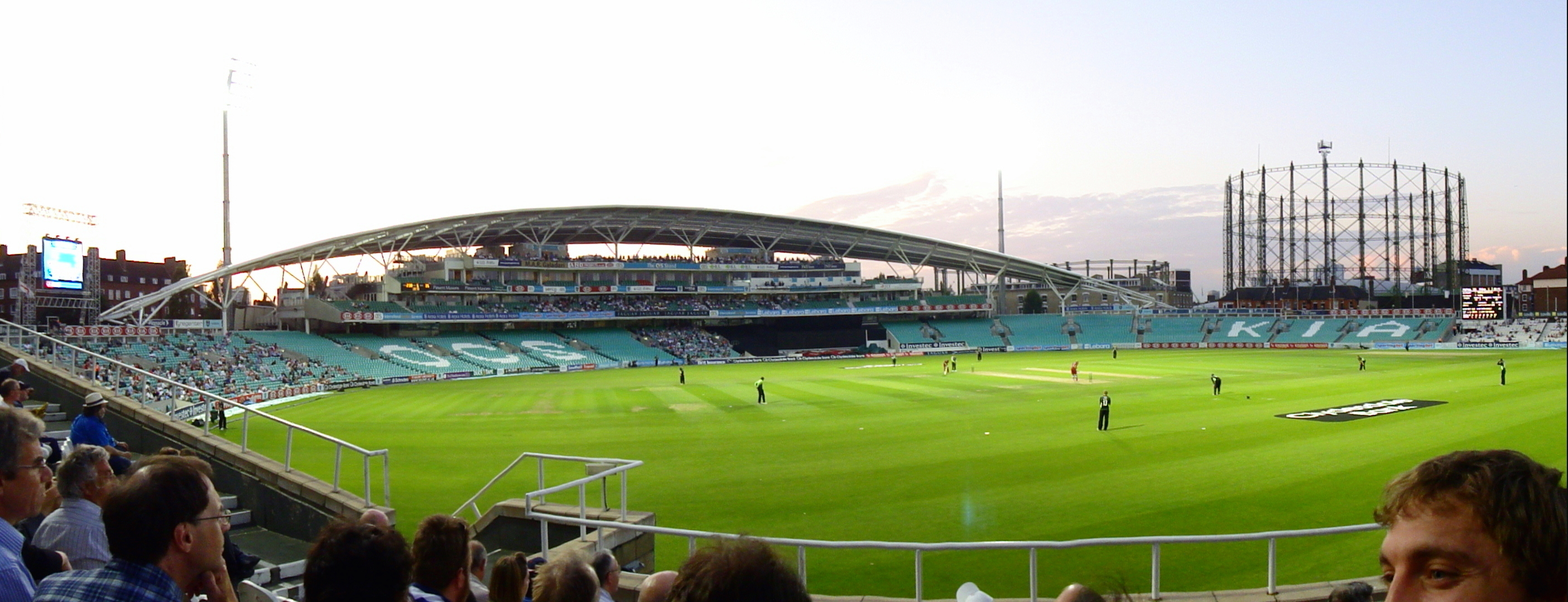
Panorama view of Kia Oval, London, The venue for Final

The World Test Championship league standings were determined based on percentage of matches won by each of the teams during the league stages of the tournament. Geoff Allardice, then acting chief executive of the ICC, explained that this adjustment was made to simplify the calculation process and create a more accurate representation of the teams' achievements. In September 2022, the ICC announced that The Oval in London would host the 2023 ICC World Test Championship Final, the second consecutive time the final was taking place in England. In February 2023, the ICC confirmed that the final would take place from 7 to 11 June 2023, with a reserve day on 12 June.

During the 2021–2023 ICC World Test Championship, both Australia and India emerged as the leading teams in terms of points. Going into the final India held the top position in the ICC Men's Test Team Rankings while Australia secured the second spot. Australia made their first-ever appearance in the WTC final, whereas India had previously suffered a defeat against New Zealand in the 2021 final. Their most recent test series, the 2022–23 Border-Gavaskar Trophy, was the last encounter between the two teams. On past performances, Australia had recorded only seven wins out of the 38 Test matches played at The Oval, while India had managed just two victories.

It is only the second instance of these two teams clashing in a final of a major ICC Event, the first being 20 years back in 2003 World Cup final at Johannesburg, South Africa where the Ricky Ponting-led mighty Australian team bamboozled a spirited Indian side led by Sourav Ganguly by a huge margin of 125 runs to successfully defend their title and win it for the third time.

Just weeks before the final, ICC made a change to the "soft signal rule", an umpire's input to the decision review system, stating that the rule would not be in effect starting from the World Test Championship final. On 7 June 2023, on the eve of the first day's play, ICC took measures to address potential disruptions from the intervention of Just Stop Oil protesters. Precautionary measures included preparation of a backup pitch for the final.

== Route to the final ==
=== League table ===
Pos.	Team	Matches				Ded.	Con.	Pts.	Pct.
Pos.	Team	P	W	L	D	Ded.	Con.	Pts.	Pct.
1	Australia	19	11	3	5	0	228	152	66.7
2	India	18	10	5	3	5	216	127	58.8
3	South Africa	15	8	6	1	0	180	100	55.6
4	England	22	10	8	4	12	264	124	47
5	Sri Lanka	12	5	6	1	0	144	64	44.44
6	New Zealand	13	4	6	3	0	156	60	38.46
7	Pakistan	14	4	6	4	0	168	64	38.1
8	West Indies	13	4	7	2	2	156	54	34.6
9	Bangladesh	12	1	10	1	0	144	16	11.1
Source: International Cricket Council, ESPNcricinfo; Last updated: 20 March 2023

=== Results ===
Australia		Round	India
Opponent	Result	League stage	Opponent	Result
England (H)	Australia 4 – 0 England	Series 1	England (A)	India 2 – 2 England
Pakistan (A)	Australia 1 – 0 Pakistan	Series 2	New Zealand (H)	India 1 – 0 New Zealand
Sri Lanka (A)	Australia 1 – 1 Sri Lanka	Series 3	South Africa (A)	India 1 – 2 South Africa
West Indies (H)	Australia 2 – 0 West Indies	Series 4	Sri Lanka (H)	India 2 – 0 Sri Lanka
South Africa (H)	Australia 2 – 0 South Africa	Series 5	Bangladesh (A)	India 2 – 0 Bangladesh
India (A)	Australia 1 – 2 India	Series 6	Australia (H)	India 2 – 1 Australia

== Squads ==
Australia	India
Pat Cummins (c); Steve Smith (vc); Scott Boland; Alex Carey (wk); Cameron Green; Marcus Harris; ~~Josh Hazlewood~~; Travis Head; Josh Inglis; Usman Khawaja; Marnus Labuschagne; Nathan Lyon; Todd Murphy; Michael Neser; Mitchell Starc; David Warner	Rohit Sharma (c); Ravichandran Ashwin; K. S. Bharat (wk); Shubman Gill; Ravindra Jadeja; Ishan Kishan (wk); Virat Kohli; Axar Patel; Cheteshwar Pujara; Ajinkya Rahane; ~~K. L. Rahul~~; Mohammed Shami; Mohammed Siraj; Shardul Thakur; Jaydev Unadkat; Umesh Yadav

=== Changes ===
- On 5 May 2023, K. L. Rahul was ruled out due to a thigh injury and on 8 May 2023, Ishan Kishan was announced as his replacement.
- On 4 June 2023, Josh Hazlewood was ruled out due to an Achilles and side issue, with Michael Neser was named as his replacement.

== Match ==
=== Match officials ===
On 29 May 2023, the ICC announced the match officials for the final.

- On-field umpires: Chris Gaffaney (NZ) and Richard Illingworth (Eng)
- Third umpire: Richard Kettleborough (Eng)
- Reserve umpire: Kumar Dharmasena (SL)
- Match referee: Richie Richardson (WI)

=== Match details and scorecard ===
7–11 June 2023
Scorecard

Australia	v	India
469 (121.3 overs); Travis Head 163 (174); Mohammed Siraj 4/108 (28.3 overs)		296 (69.4 overs); Ajinkya Rahane 89 (129); Pat Cummins 3/84 (20 overs)
270/8d (84.3 overs); Alex Carey 66* (105); Ravindra Jadeja 3/58 (23 overs)		234 (63.3 overs); Virat Kohli 49 (78); Nathan Lyon 4/41 (15.3 overs)

Australia won by 209 runs
The Oval, London
Umpires: Chris Gaffaney (NZ) and Richard Illingworth (Eng)
Player of the match: Travis Head (Aus)

- India won the toss and elected to field.
- Rohit Sharma (Ind) and Pat Cummins (Aus) both played their 50th Test.
- Mohammed Siraj (Ind) took his 50th wicket in Tests.
- Ajinkya Rahane (Ind) scored his 5000th run in Test cricket.
- Cheteshwar Pujara and Mohammed Shami (Ind) both played in their last Test.
- With this victory, Australia became the first team to win all major ICC titles.

=== Summary ===
==== Day 1 ====
Australian opener David Warner made a steady start for his team, while his partner Usman Khawaja fell for a duck to Mohammad Siraj's delivery. By the lunch break, Australia had reached a score of 73/2. Shortly after lunch, Marnus Labuschagne was dismissed by Mohammed Shami. Travis Head, batting at number five, adopted an aggressive approach and scored runs quickly, surpassing the fifty-run mark before tea. At that stage, Australia's total stood at 170/3. Following tea, Head and Steve Smith formed a valuable partnership, reaching the milestone of a hundred runs together. Smith also completed his fifty during the course of their partnership. In the 66th over, Head achieved the significant feat of scoring a century, marking his first century outside of Australia. By the end of the day's play, the partnership between Smith and Head had reached 251 runs, with Australia finishing strongly at 327/3. Head's individual score stood at 146, while Smith remained unbeaten on 95.

==== Day 2 ====
On the second day of the match, Smith also reached the milestone of scoring a century for the thirty-first time in Test cricket. However, the Indian pacers soon started taking wickets. Travis Head was dismissed by Siraj, followed by a quick succession of wickets with Cameron Green and Smith both falling, the latter being bowled by Shardul Thakur. By lunchtime, Australia's score stood at 422/7. After the break, the wickets continued to tumble at one end while Alex Carey showed resilience with a knock of 48 before being adjudged lbw to Ravindra Jadeja. At a total of 469, the last tailender and captain Pat Cummins departed after being caught by Ajinkya Rahane at the covers.

It was then time for the Indian openers, Shubman Gill and captain Rohit Sharma, to take the field. However, Sharma was dismissed by opposition skipper Cummins, and shortly after, Gill made a judgment error and was bowled. As tea approached, India found themselves at 30/2, with Virat Kohli and Cheteshwar Pujara at the crease. In the last session of the day, India continued to lose wickets, with Kohli and Pujara being dismissed by Mitchell Starc and Cameron Green, respectively. Jadeja increased the scoring rate for the team before being caught by Smith off the bowling of Nathan Lyon. As the day concluded, India were on 151/5, with Rahane on 29, accompanied by wicketkeeper-batsman K. S. Bharat.

==== Day 3 ====
At the beginning of the third day, Bharat fell swiftly to Scott Boland's bowling, while Thakur survived a dropped catch in the slips. Rahane eventually reached the fifty with a six, albeit being given another lifeline when Warner dropped him. Cummins appeared to have Thakur dismissed lbw, but the decision was overturned due to a no-ball, similar to what happened with Rahane the previous day. Approaching the lunch break, India's score reached 260/6. Shortly after lunch, Rahane's innings came to an end as he was caught by Green while on 89. Thakur managed to complete his fifty, but his dismissal triggered a collapse in India's score, concluding at 296 and trailing by 173 runs.

Australia's second innings commenced with an early setback, as Warner was caught behind off Siraj's bowling. By tea, Australia had reached 23/1. However, in the post-tea session, Khawaja also fell victim to a catch behind off Umesh Yadav's delivery. Labuschagne and Smith then formed a fifty partnership, but their progress was halted when Smith's aggressive shot was caught off Jadeja's bowling. Head, who had displayed exceptional form in the previous innings, entered the crease but soon fell prey to a caught and bowled off Jadeja's delivery, two balls after Yadav's fumble resulted in an unintended six. Australia concluded the day at 123/4, holding a lead of 296 runs.

==== Day 4 ====
On the fourth day's commencement, Labuschagne was caught in the slip cordon by Pujara. Green and Carey displayed determined batting, forging a partnership that approached the fifty-run mark until Green's dismissal, wherein the ball dislodged the bails in an unconventional manner. By lunchtime, Australia's score stood at 201/6. As play resumed, Carey reached his half-century after previously missing out, while Starc exhibited quick scoring at the other end. By the 79th over, Australia's lead exceeded 400 runs. Following Starc's departure on 41, Cummins was soon caught, prompting the declaration of the innings.

With a target of 444 runs, India faced the task of chasing down what would have been a record-breaking chase in Test cricket. The openers adopted an aggressive approach, scoring at a run-a-ball rate, until a contentious slip catch was claimed by Green off the bat of Gill. Before tea, India had reached 41/1 in 7 overs of their innings. Upon resumption, Pujara and Sharma constructed a fifty-run partnership, but Sharma fell victim to an lbw decision while attempting a lap-sweep off Lyon's bowling. Soon after, Pujara also departed. However, Kohli and Rahane formed a seventy-run partnership, with Kohli on 44* and Rahane on 20*. As on the final day, India had to chase down a target of 280 runs.

==== Day 5 ====
On the final day of the game, the momentum shifted in favour of Australia as Kohli, batting at 49, edged a delivery that was caught by Smith, diving to his right to collect it two-handed. Two balls later, Jadeja fell victim to Boland's delivery, departing the field without adding any runs to the scoreboard. For India, the wickets continued to tumble, and they were eventually bowled out for a total of 234 runs. With this result, Australia emerged victorious in the 2021–2023 ICC World Test Championship, securing a 209-run win. Travis Head, who made significant contributions, received player of the match award. This achievement established Australia as the first and, thus far, the only team to have won all ICC tournaments.

Scorecard Source:

Australia 1st innings

Australia batting
Player	Status	Runs	Balls	4s	6s	Strike rate
David Warner	c †Bharat b Thakur	43	60	8	0	71.66
Usman Khawaja	c †Bharat b Siraj	0	10	0	0	0.00
Marnus Labuschagne	b Shami	26	62	3	0	41.93
Steve Smith	b Thakur	121	268	19	0	45.14
Travis Head	c †Bharat b Siraj	163	174	25	1	93.67
Cameron Green	c Gill b Shami	6	7	1	0	85.71
Alex Carey	lbw b Jadeja	48	69	7	1	69.56
Mitchell Starc	run out (sub [Patel])	5	20	0	0	25.00
Pat Cummins	c Rahane b Siraj	9	34	0	0	26.47
Nathan Lyon	b Siraj	9	25	1	0	36.00
Scott Boland	not out	1	7	0	0	14.28
Extras	(b 13, lb 10, nb 7, w 8)	38				
Total	(10 wickets; 121.3 overs)	469		64	2	

Fall of wickets: 1–2 (Khawaja, 3.4 ov), 2–71 (Warner, 21.4 ov), 3–76 (Labuschagne, 24.1 ov), 4–361 (Head, 91.1 ov), 5–376 (Green, 94.2 ov), 6–387 (Smith, 98.1 ov), 7–402 (Starc, 103.5 ov), 8–453 (Carey, 114.4 ov), 9–468 (Lyon, 119.5 ov), 10–469 (Cummins, 121.3 ov)

India bowling
Bowler	Overs	Maidens	Runs	Wickets	Econ	Wides	NBs
Mohammed Shami	29	4	122	2	4.20	1	2
Mohammed Siraj	28.3	4	108	4	3.78	3	1
Umesh Yadav	23	5	77	0	3.34	0	0
Shardul Thakur	23	4	83	2	3.60	0	4
Ravindra Jadeja	18	2	56	1	3.11	0	0

India 1st innings

India batting
Player	Status	Runs	Balls	4s	6s	Strike rate
Rohit Sharma	lbw b Cummins	15	26	2	0	57.69
Shubman Gill	b Boland	13	15	2	0	86.66
Cheteshwar Pujara	b Green	14	25	2	0	56.00
Virat Kohli	c Smith b Starc	14	31	2	0	45.16
Ajinkya Rahane	c Green b Cummins	89	129	11	1	68.99
Ravindra Jadeja	c Smith b Lyon	48	51	7	1	94.11
K. S. Bharat	b Boland	5	15	0	0	33.33
Shardul Thakur	c †Carey b Green	51	109	6	0	46.78
Umesh Yadav	b Cummins	5	11	1	0	45.45
Mohammed Shami	c †Carey b Starc	13	11	2	0	118.18
Mohammed Siraj	not out	0	3	0	0	0.00
Extras	(b 10, lb 10, nb 8, w 1)	29				
Total	(10 wickets; 69.4 overs)	296		35	2	

Fall of wickets: 1–30 (Rohit, 5.6 ov), 2–30 (Gill, 6.4 ov), 3–50 (Pujara, 13.5 ov), 4–71 (Kohli, 18.2 ov), 5–142 (Jadeja, 34.3 ov), 6–152 (Bharat, 38.2 ov), 7–261 (Rahane, 61.6 ov), 8–271 (Yadav, 65.5 ov), 9–294 (Thakur, 68.3 ov), 10–296 (Shami, 69.4 ov)

Australia bowling
Bowler	Overs	Maidens	Runs	Wickets	Econ	Wides	NBs
Mitchell Starc	13.4	0	71	2	5.19	0	0
Pat Cummins	20	2	83	3	4.15	0	6
Scott Boland	20	6	59	2	2.95	0	0
Cameron Green	12	1	44	2	3.66	1	2
Nathan Lyon	4	0	19	1	4.75	0	0

Australia 2nd innings

Australia batting
Player	Status	Runs	Balls	4s	6s	Strike rate
Usman Khawaja	c †Bharat b Yadav	13	39	2	0	33.33
David Warner	c †Bharat b Siraj	1	8	0	0	12.50
Marnus Labuschagne	c Pujara b Yadav	41	126	4	0	32.53
Steve Smith	c Thakur b Jadeja	34	47	3	0	72.34
Travis Head	c & b Jadeja	18	27	0	2	66.66
Cameron Green	b Jadeja	25	95	4	0	26.31
Alex Carey	not out	66	105	8	0	62.85
Mitchell Starc	c Kohli b Shami	41	57	7	0	71.92
Pat Cummins	c sub (Patel) b Shami	5	5	1	0	100.00
Extras	(b 9, lb 9, nb 2, w 6)	26				
Total	(8 wickets; 84.3 overs)	270/8d		29	2	

Fall of wickets: 1–2 (Warner, 3.3 ov), 2–24 (Khawaja, 14.1 ov), 3–86 (Smith, 30.1 ov), 4–111 (Head, 36.3 ov), 5–124 (Labuschagne, 46.4 ov), 6–167 (Green, 62.6 ov), 7–260 (Starc, 82.6 ov), 8–270 (Cummins, 84.3 ov)

India bowling
Bowler	Overs	Maidens	Runs	Wickets	Econ	Wides	NBs
Mohammed Shami	16.3	6	39	2	2.36	1	1
Mohammed Siraj	20	2	80	1	4.00	1	1
Shardul Thakur	8	1	21	0	2.62	0	0
Umesh Yadav	17	1	54	2	3.17	0	0
Ravindra Jadeja	23	4	58	3	2.52	0	0

India 2nd innings

India batting
Player	Status	Runs	Balls	4s	6s	Strike rate
Rohit Sharma	lbw b Lyon	43	60	7	1	71.66
Shubman Gill	c Green b Boland	18	19	2	0	94.73
Cheteshwar Pujara	c †Carey b Cummins	27	47	5	0	57.44
Virat Kohli	c Smith b Boland	49	78	7	0	62.82
Ajinkya Rahane	c †Carey b Starc	46	108	7	0	42.59
Ravindra Jadeja	c †Carey b Boland	0	2	0	0	0.00
K. S. Bharat	c & b Lyon	23	41	2	0	56.09
Shardul Thakur	lbw b Lyon	0	5	0	0	0.00
Umesh Yadav	c †Carey b Starc	1	12	0	0	8.33
Mohammed Shami	not out	13	8	3	0	162.50
Mohammed Siraj	c Boland b Lyon	1	6	0	0	16.66
Extras	(lb 2, nb 5, w 6)	13				
Total	(10 wickets; 63.3 overs)	234		33	1	

Fall of wickets: 1–41 (Gill, 7.1 ov), 2–92 (Rohit, 19.5 ov), 3–93 (Pujara, 20.4 ov), 4–179 (Kohli, 46.3 ov), 5–179 (Jadeja, 46.5 ov), 6–212 (Rahane, 56.2 ov), 7–213 (Thakur, 57.4 ov), 8–220 (Yadav, 60.2 ov), 9–224 (Bharat, 61.5 ov), 10–234 (Siraj, 63.3 ov)

Australia bowling
Bowler	Overs	Maidens	Runs	Wickets	Econ	Wides	NBs
Pat Cummins	13	1	55	1	4.23	1	4
Scott Boland	16	2	46	3	2.87	0	0
Mitchell Starc	14	1	77	2	5.50	0	1
Cameron Green	5	0	13	0	2.60	1	0
Nathan Lyon	15.3	2	41	4	2.64	0	0

== Broadcasting ==
List of broadcasters
Country	Television broadcaster(s)	Radio	Digital streaming
Afghanistan	Ariana Television; Ariana News		Ariana Television; Ariana News
Australia	Seven Network	SEN	7plus
Bangladesh	GTV; T Sports		Rabbithole, Toffee
United Kingdom; Ireland	Sky Sports	BBC	Sky Go; NOW
All Caribbean islands	Sportsmax		Sportsmax App
USA and Canada	Willow		Willow TV
India	Star Sports	All India Radio	Disney+ Hotstar
New Zealand	Sky Sports	NZME Radio	Sky Go; Sky Sports Now
MENA	CricLife; Starzplay		
Sri Lanka	Maharaja TV; TV One		
Sub Saharan Africa	Supersport		DSTV App
Pacific Islands	Digicel; TVWan Sports 2 TVWan Sports 3		
Rest of the World			ICC.tv

The ICC also named the following panel of commentators for the final:

- Harsha Bhogle
- Sunil Gavaskar
- Matthew Hayden
- Nasser Hussain
- Dinesh Karthik
- Justin Langer
- Alison Mitchell
- Ricky Ponting
- Kumar Sangakkara
- Ravi Shastri
