= Langloan Cricket Ground =

Cricket ground in Coatbridge, Scotland

Coordinates: 55°51′32.34″N 04°02′51.91″W

- Interactive map of Langloan Cricket Ground

Ground information
- Location: Coatbridge, Scotland
- Country: Scotland
- Establishment: 1860 (first recorded match)

Team information
Scotland	(1980–1985)
- As of 19 October 2011; Source: Ground profile

Langloan Cricket Ground is a cricket ground in Coatbridge, Scotland. The first recorded match held on the ground came in 1860 when Colonel Buchanan's Scotland Team played Ireland. The ground held its first first-class match when Scotland played Ireland in 1980. The ground held a further first-class match in 1985 when Scotland played the touring Zimbabweans.

The ground is still in use today by Drumpellier Cricket Club.
