= Australian cricket team in Scotland in 2013 =

	Australia	Scotland
- Dates: 3 September 2013
Captains	Michael Clarke	Preston Mommsen

One Day International series

The Australia cricket team visited Scotland on 3 September 2013 for a one-match One Day International series against the Scotland cricket team at Grange Cricket Club Ground, Raeburn Place, Edinburgh. The match served as a warm-up for Australia ahead of their five-match ODI series against England later in the month. Australia won the match by 200 runs.

== Squads ==
Australia	Scotland
Michael Clarke (c); George Bailey; James Faulkner; Fawad Ahmed; Aaron Finch; Mitchell Johnson; Clint McKay; Shaun Marsh; Adam Voges; Matthew Wade (wk); Shane Watson	Preston Mommsen (c); Richie Berrington; Freddie Coleman; Gordon Drummond; Hamish Gardiner; Gordon Goudie; Majid Haq; Matt Machan; Calum MacLeod; David Murphy (wk); Iain Wardlaw

== ODI series ==
=== Only ODI ===
3 September 2013
10:45
Scorecard

Australia; 362/3 (50 overs)	v	Scotland; 162 (43.5 overs)
Shaun Marsh 151 (151); Iain Wardlaw 2/69 (10 overs)		Matt Machan 39 (54); Mitchell Johnson 4/36 (9.5 overs)

Australia won by 200 runs
Grange Cricket Club Ground, Edinburgh
Umpires: Ian Ramage (Sco) and Sundaram Ravi (Ind)

- Scotland won the toss and elected to field.
- Fawad Ahmed (Aus) and Hamish Gardiner (Sco) made their ODI debuts.
