= Forthill =

Cricket ground in Dundee, Scotland

Forthill Cricket Ground
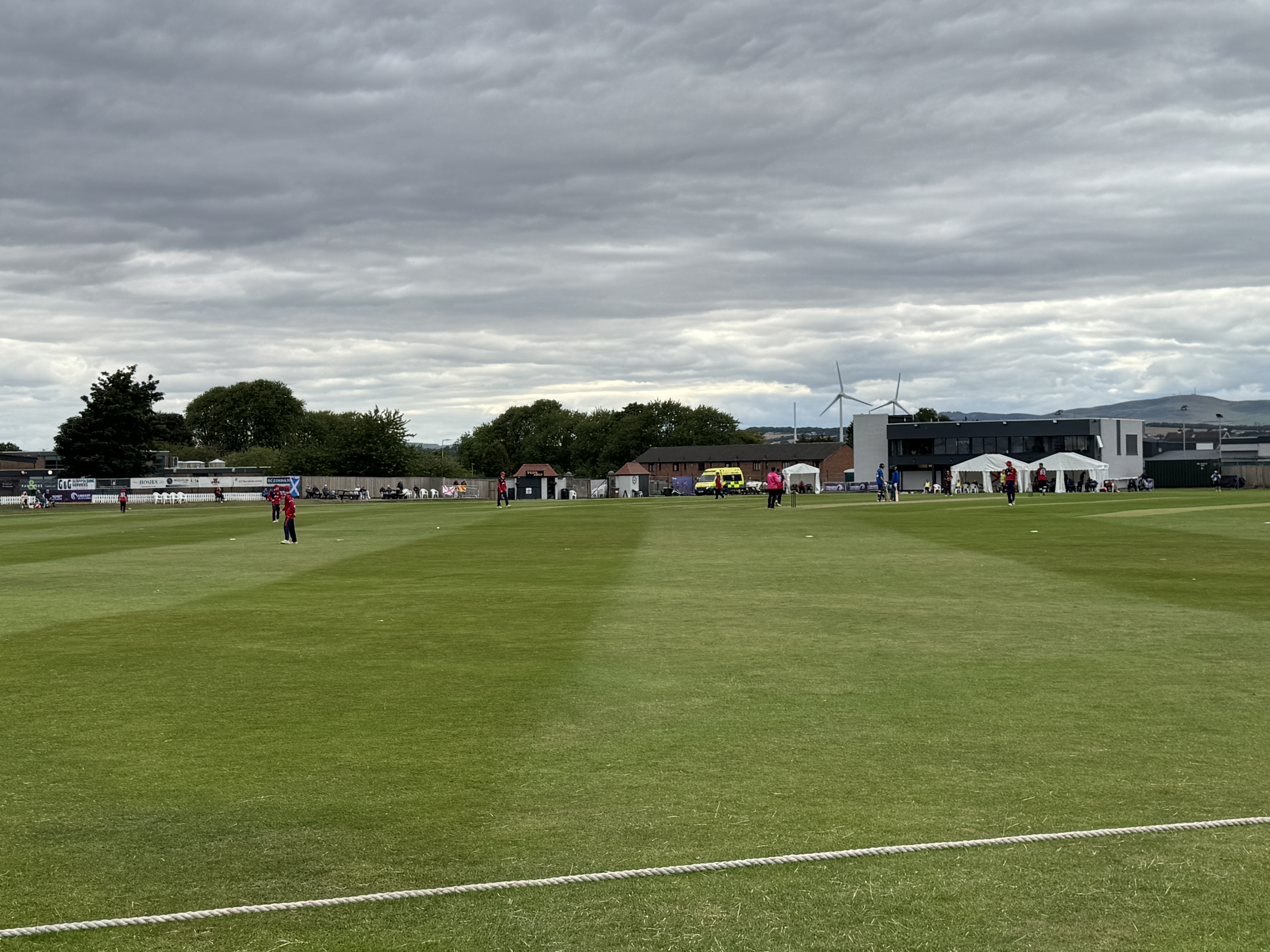
- Interactive map of Forthill Cricket Ground

Ground information
- Location: Fintry Place, Dundee
- Country: Scotland
- Coordinates: 56.475°N 2.870°W
- Establishment: 1880
- Owner: Forthill Community Sports Club
- Operator: Forfarshire Cricket Club

International information
- First men's ODI: 16 July 2024: Scotland v Oman
- Last men's ODI: 12 June 2025: Scotland v Netherlands
- First women's T20I: 31 August 2019: Scotland v United States
- Last women's T20I: 7 September 2019: Bangladesh v Thailand

Team information
Forfarshire	(1880 – present)
Scotland	(1913 – 1999; 2019 – present)
Panmure RFC (Rugby)	(1888 – 1953; 1968 – present)
Broughty (Football)	(1882 – 1892)
- As of 9 June 2025; Source: Ground profile

Forthill Cricket Ground is a cricket ground in Broughty Ferry, Dundee, Scotland. It is the home of Forfarshire Cricket Club and hosts matches for the Scotland national cricket team. It has been used for cricket since 1880, when the newly-formed Forfarshire played their first match against Glenalmond College there. Scotland first used the ground in 1913 when they played Northamptonshire.

The ground staged six first-class matches between 1924 and 1999. The first was in 1924 when Scotland played Ireland. The touring Indians played Scotland in a first-class match there in 1932. Almost twenty years elapsed before first-class cricket returned to Forthill, with Scotland playing Worcestershire in 1951. The ground later played host to the touring New Zealanders in 1978 and Ireland in 1992, before hosting its final first-class match when Scotland played the South Africa Academy. During the twentieth century the ground also hosted several other touring teams in non-first-class matches.

== History ==
Forthill held its and Forfarshire's inaugural match on 22 May 1880, when Forfarshire played Glenalmond College.

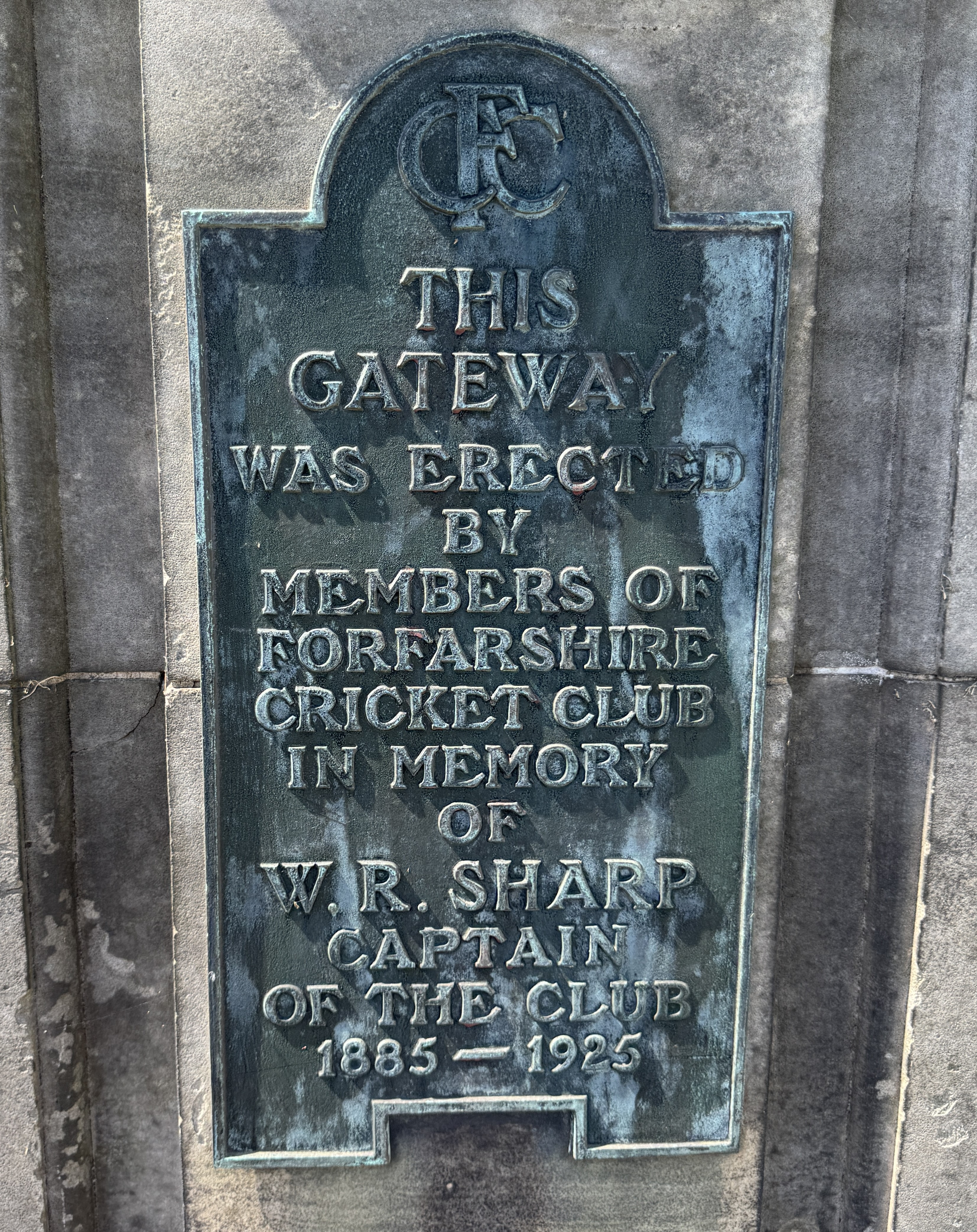
Plaque dedicating the gates at Forthill to Forfarshire's late captain, W. R. Sharp

In 1926 a new stone gateway was erected in honour of Forfarshire's first Scotland-capped player and club captain of 40 years, W. R. Sharp, who had died suddenly the previous year. The gateway is still dedicated to his memory.

== Domestic cricket ==
Between 1902 and 1995, Forthill hosted Forfarshire's Scottish County Championship home games. During the early years of the championship, derby matches with Perthshire were watched by more than 20,000 people.

Since the amalgamation of the county game with the regional leagues in 1996, the ground has also been Forfarshire's home for both Scottish National Cricket League (SNCL) games and the most recent iteration of the club's participation in Scottish domestic cricket, the Eastern Premier League.

== International matches ==
Forthill hosted its first international on the 1st August 1913. Scotland stopped using the ground in 1999. In 2024 Forthill once again hosted matches for the national side, this time the One Day International (ODI) Tri-Nation Series for the 2024–2026 Cricket World Cup League 2. During this tournament, then-Forfarshire player Charlie Cassell took seven wickets from 21 balls on his first cap for Scotland against Oman, the best figures in ODI for a debut.

In 2025 the ground hosted the same tournament as well as qualifiers for the 2026 Under-19 Cricket World Cup, including the match in which Scotland's team qualified.

== Transport connections ==
Service	Station/Stop	Lines/Routes served	Distance
Moffat & Williamson	Fintry Place	78A, 78C	208 yards (190 m)
Xplore Dundee	Fintry Place	5, 5A	208 yards (190 m)
Xplore Dundee	Post Office	5, 5A	0.62 miles (1.00 km)
Stagecoach	Post Office	73, 74	0.62 miles (1.00 km)
Moffat & Williamson	Post Office	78A, 78C	0.62 miles (1.00 km)
Ember	Baldovie Road	E10	1 mile (1.6 km)
National Rail	Broughty Ferry	Dundee–Aberdeen line (ScotRail)	0.75 miles (1.21 km)

== See also ==
- List of cricket grounds in Scotland
