= Moffat & Williamson =

Bus operator in East Scotland

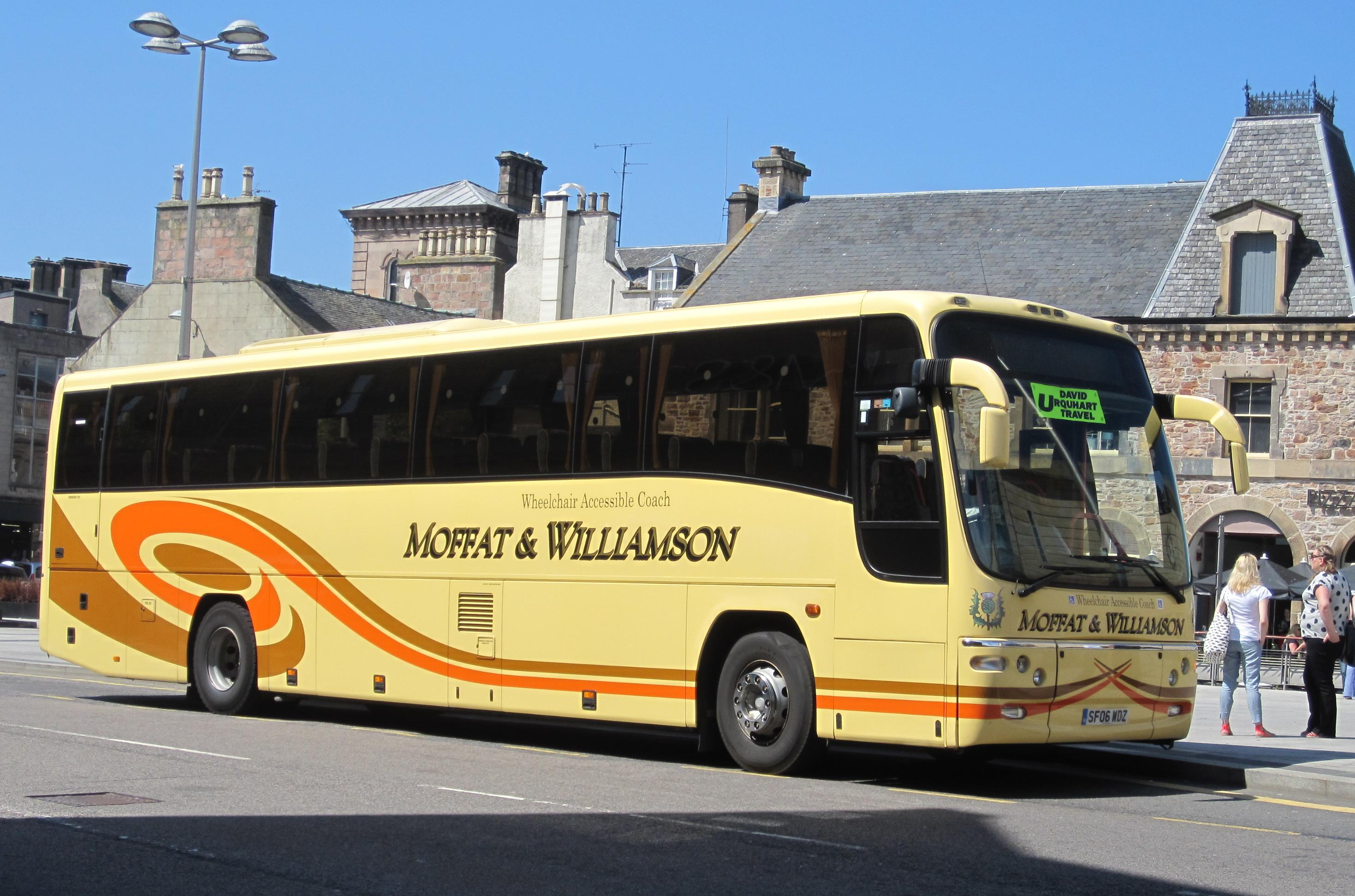
- Moffat & Williamson coach in Inverness
- Parent: Stagecoach Group
- Founded: 1945
- Headquarters: Newport-on-Tay, Scotland, UK
- Service area: Fife; Tayside
- Service type: Bus and coach
- Depots: 2
- Fleet: 74 (August 2025)
- Managing Director: George Devine
- Website: https://moffat-williamson.co.uk/

Moffat & Williamson is a bus and coach operator providing services to Fife and parts of Tayside, predominantly Dundee. It is headquartered in Newport-on-Tay.

== History ==
The company was founded in 1945 as two separate bus companies; they amalgamated in 1978. Its current managing director is George Devine who has been in the post since 2012.
