= Jasper Davidson =

Scottish cricketer

Personal information
- Full name: Jasper John Davidson
- Born: 15 March 2002 (age 24); Edinburgh, Scotland
- Batting: Right-handed
- Bowling: Right-arm fast
- Role: Bowler
- Relatives: Oliver Davidson (brother)

International information
- National side: Scotland
- ODI debut (cap 82): 16 July 2024 v Oman
- Last ODI: 9 August 2026 v UAE
- T20I debut (cap 61): 4 September 2024 v Australia
- Last T20I: 18 April 2026 v Namibia

Domestic team information
- Years: Team
- 2026: Rotterdam Dockers

Career statistics
Competition	ODI	T20I	FC	LA
Matches	10	6	1	12
Runs scored	47	7	41	53
Batting average	–	–	–	53.00
100s/50s	0/0	0/0	0/0	0/0
Top score	24*	4*	41*	24*
Balls bowled	474	126	150	570
Wickets	14	9	4	22
Bowling average	34.28	18.66	19.75	26.68
5 wickets in innings	0	0	0	1
10 wickets in match	0	0	0	0
Best bowling	4/23	3/51	2/35	7/75
Catches/stumpings	3/–	1/–	1/–	3/–
- Source: ESPNcricinfo, 15 August 2026

Jasper John Davidson (born 15 March 2002) is a Scottish cricketer.

== Career ==
While a student at Bromsgrove School, Davidson represented Scotland national under-19s at the ICC Under-19 World Cup European qualification tournament in July 2019, where he finished the tournament as the top all-rounder, scoring 217 runs at an average of 54.50 and taking seven wickets. He went on to represent Scotland at the 2020 Under-19 Cricket World Cup in January 2020.

In July 2022, Davidson made his debut for Herefordshire in the National Counties Cricket Championship.

He made his One Day International debut on 16 July 2024 against Oman at Forthill, as part of the 2024–2026 Cricket World Cup League 2. In August 2024, he was named in Scotland's T20I squad for the series against Australia. He made his Twenty20 International debut against Australia at The Grange Club, on 4 September 2024.

In October 2025, Davidson was named as part of the Marylebone Cricket Club's overseas tour of Zimbabwe, where he made his first-class debut against Zimbabwe A.

In January 2026, Davidson was named as a travelling reserve in Scotland's squad for the 2026 ICC Men's T20 World Cup tournament, alongside his brother Oliver.
