= Charlie Cassell =

Scottish cricketer

Personal information
- Full name: Charles Alexander Allenby Cassell
- Born: 25 October 1998 (age 28); Aberdeen, Scotland
- Batting: Right-handed
- Bowling: Right-arm medium
- Role: Bowler

International information
- National side: Scotland (2024–present)
- ODI debut (cap 83): 22 July 2024 v Oman
- Last ODI: 12 June 2025 v Netherlands
- T20I debut (cap 60): 4 September 2024 v Australia
- Last T20I: 18 June 2025 v Netherlands

Domestic team information
- Years: Team
- 2024: Somerset (squad no. 25)

Career statistics
Competition	ODI	T20I	LA	T20
Matches	6	2	11	2
Runs scored	4	3	4	3
Batting average	4.00	3.00	2.00	3.00
100s/50s	0/0	0/0	0/0	0/0
Top score	4	2*	4	2*
Balls bowled	274	30	424	30
Wickets	11	2	14	2
Bowling average	24.36	32.50	29.57	32.50
5 wickets in innings	1	0	1	0
10 wickets in match	0	0	0	0
Best bowling	7/21	2/46	7/21	2/46
Catches/stumpings	1/–	3/–	2/–	3/–
- Source: Cricinfo, 26 June 2025

Charles Alexander Allenby Cassell (born 25 October 1998) is a Scottish cricketer who currently plays for Heriot's Cricket Club. He plays as a right-arm fast bowler. He made his international debut for Scotland in 2024.

== Domestic career ==
In June 2024, he was signed by Forfarshire for the 2024 season.

In July 2024, Cassell was signed by Somerset for their One Day Cup campaign.

== International career ==
On 15 July 2024, he was added to the Scotland's squad as a replacement of Chris Sole, for the 2024 Scotland Tri-Nation Series, which was formed part of 2024–2026 Cricket World Cup League 2. Cassell made his One Day International (ODI) debut against Oman in the same series, on 22 July 2024, and achieving best figures of 7/21 on debut.
