= List of North West Warriors List A players =

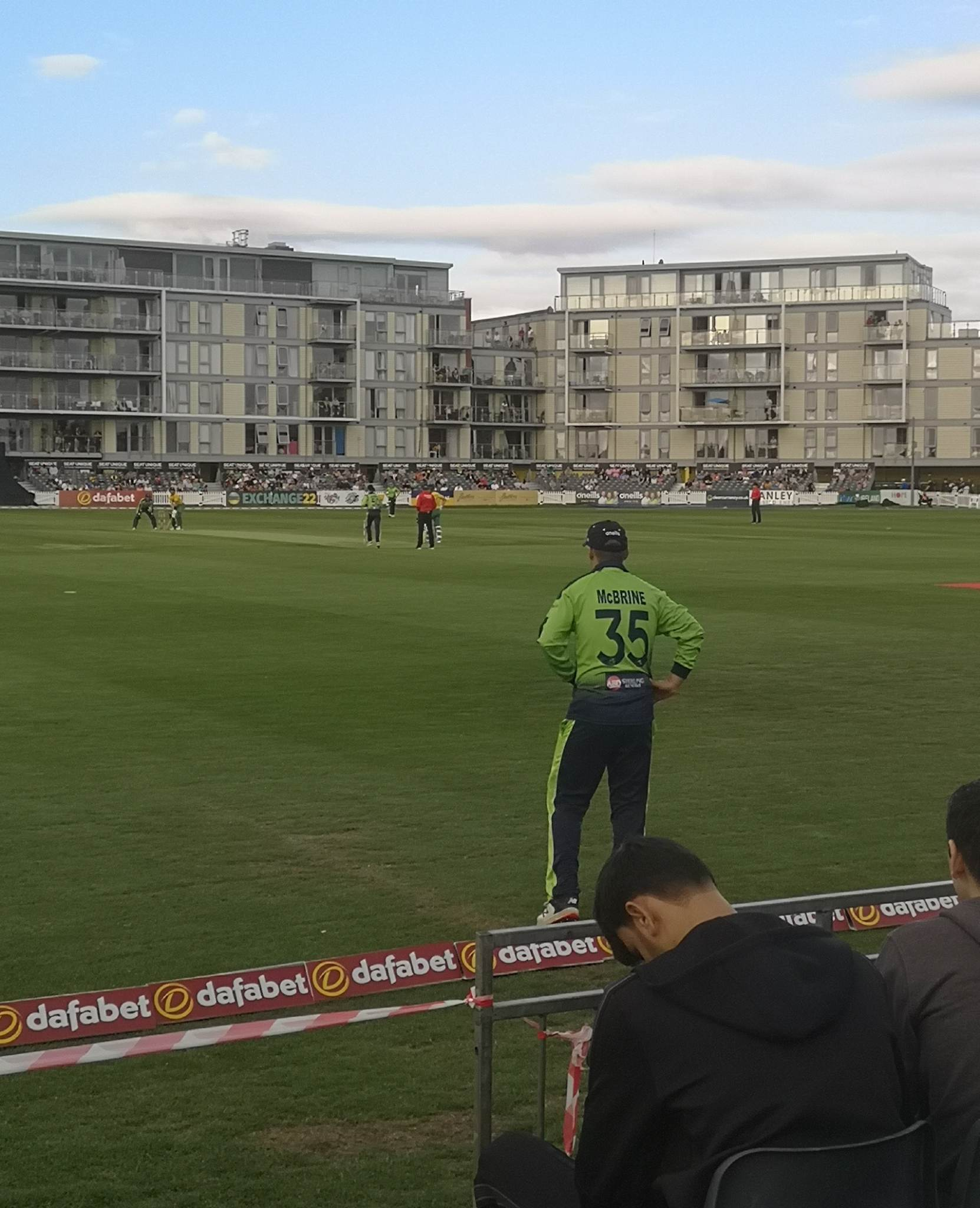
Andy McBrine (pictured) has the most runs (849) and has taken the joint most wickets (40) for North West Warriors in List A cricket.

North West Warriors was formed in 2013 and became a List A team in 2017. They played their inaugural List A match in the 2017 Inter-Provincial Cup against Leinster Lightning. In total, 56 players have appeared in List A cricket for North West Warriors.

Andy McBrine is North West Warriors leading run-scorer in List A cricket, aggregating 1,128 runs. Sam Topping is one of four North West Warriors player to score a century in the format, and holds the highest score in the format, with 120 scored in 2025 against Northern Knights. For players to have made five or more appearances, Andrew Balbirnie has the teams best batting average: 70.00. Among the bowlers, McBrine and Craig Young have jointly taken the most wickets for North West Warriors with 40. Scott MacBeth has the best bowling figures in an innings: he claimed six wickets against Munster Reds in a 2024 match, while conceding 22 runs.

Players are initially listed in order of appearance; where players made their debut in the same match, they are initially listed by batting order.

== Key ==
General

- † – Wicket-keeper
- First – Year of List A debut for North West Warriors
- Last – Year of latest List A match for North West Warriors
- Mat – Number of List A appearances for North West Warriors

Batting

- Runs – Runs scored in career
- HS – Highest score
- Avg – Runs scored per dismissal
- * – Batsman remained not out

Bowling

- Balls – Balls bowled in career
- Wkt – Wickets taken in career
- BBI – Best bowling in an innings
- Ave – Average runs per wicket

Fielding

- Ca – Catches taken
- St – Stumpings effected
All statistics correct as of the end of the Irish 2026 cricket season.

== List of List A cricketers ==
North West Warriors List A players
No.	Name	Nationality	First	Last	Mat	Runs	HS	Avg	Balls	Wkt	BBI	Ave	Ca	St	Ref(s)
No.	Name	Nationality	First	Last	Mat	Batting			Bowling				Fielding		Ref(s)
1	David Rankin	Ireland	2017	2019	12	207	84	18.81	0	–	–	–	5	0	
2	Stuart Thompson	Ireland	2017	2021	16	309	59	22.07	447	14	4/55	28.42	9	0	
3	Irosh Samarasooriya	Sri Lanka	2017	2017	2	77	77	77.00	0	–	–	–	0	0	
4	Niall O'Brien †	Ireland	2017	2018	5	139	57*	69.50	0	–	–	–	11	1	
5	Andy McBrine	Ireland	2017	2026	41	1,128	117	31.33	1,813	40	3/32	31.92	12	0	
6	Gary McClintock	Ireland	2017	2017	1	10	10	10.00	6	0	–	–	1	0	
7	Steve Vijay Lazars	Ireland	2017	2017	4	2	2	0.66	150	5	2/44	24.00	2	0	
8	Rickie-Lee Dougherty †	Ireland	2017	2017	4	46	24	23.00	0	–	–	–	2	1	
9	Johnny Thompson	Ireland	2017	2017	3	85	51	42.50	132	2	2/46	59.50	1	0	
10	Andrew Britton	Ireland	2017	2019	5	62	36*	15.50	198	7	5/23	19.57	2	0	
11	Craig Young	Ireland	2017	2026	31	135	27	8.43	1,309	40	4/50	28.70	7	0	
12	Imran Butt	Pakistan	2017	2017	2	7	7	7.00	0	–	–	–	0	0	
13	Aaron Gillespie	Ireland	2017	2019	9	90	54	12.85	12	2	2/14	7.00	2	0	
14	David Scanlon	Ireland	2017	2019	8	15	11	3.75	277	8	4/60	32.87	1	0	
15	Ross Allen	Ireland	2017	2021	12	37	9	6.16	241	11	3/9	18.63	3	0	
16	David Barr	Ireland	2017	2019	7	102	31	14.57	0	–	–	–	1	0	
17	William McClintock	Ireland	2017	2023	15	199	72*	22.11	0	–	–	–	3	0	
18	William Porterfield	Ireland	2018	2021	15	609	110*	43.50	0	–	–	–	3	0	
19	Graham Kennedy	Ireland	2018	2022	19	323	64	21.53	633	13	3/48	39.84	8	0	
20	Ryan MacBeth	Ireland	2018	2026	23	105	29*	17.50	942	31	4/33	26.19	1	0	
21	Andrew Austin †	Ireland	2019	2019	2	46	23	23.00	0	–	–	–	0	0	
22	Boyd Rankin	Ireland	2019	2021	4	0	0	0.00	132	2	1/33	80.00	1	0	
23	Marcus Poskitt	Ireland	2019	2019	2	23	13	11.50	0	–	–	–	0	0	
23	Graham Hume	Ireland	2019	2024	24	409	79*	34.08	1,008	27	4/18	24.51	9	0	
23	Brendon Louw †	South Africa	2019	2019	2	20	20	10.00	0	–	–	–	0	0	
24	Adam McDaid	Ireland	2019	2019	1	6	6	6.00	0	–	–	–	1	0	
25	Gregory McFaul	Ireland	2019	2019	1	0	0*	–	24	2	2/39	19.50	0	0	
26	Will Smale †	Wales	2019	2020	3	100	48	33.33	0	–	–	–	2	0	
27	Nathan McGuire	Ireland	2020	2023	10	143	53*	20.42	12	0	–	–	4	0	
28	Varun Chopra	Ireland	2020	2021	3	3	3*	–	54	1	1/23	69.00	0	0	
29	Conor Olphert	Ireland	2020	2022	6	10	7	10.00	267	9	3/83	26.77	1	0	
30	Stephen Doheny †	Ireland	2021	2024	19	575	97	30.26	0	–	–	–	18	2	
31	Shane Getkate	Ireland	2021	2024	15	395	81	35.90	147	1	1/73	166.00	5	0	
32	Kyle Magee	Ireland	2021	2021	1	4	4	4.00	0	–	–	–	0	0	
33	Scott MacBeth	Ireland	2022	2026	25	427	75	18.56	537	23	6/22	22.69	9	0	
34	Jared Wilson	Ireland	2022	2026	21	381	64	27.21	434	9	2/53	46.33	10	0	
35	Aniruddha Chore †	India	2023	2023	3	85	36	28.33	0	–	–	–	5	0	
36	Michael Erlank	South Africa	2023	2023	2	37	28	18.50	102	7	4/46	9.57	0	0	
37	Cameron Melly	Ireland	2023	2025	17	276	44	21.23	0	–	–	–	7	0	
38	Trent McKeegan	Ireland	2023	2026	8	17	15	8.50	289	8	3/33	49.00	1	0	
39	Harry Zimmermann	Ireland	2023	2024	4	13	6	6.50	136	7	4/36	16.42	1	0	
40	Cian Robertson	Ireland	2023	2023	2	5	5	5.00	120	1	1/36	65.00	1	0	
41	Liam Doherty	Ireland	2023	2024	6	91	34	15.16	36	0	–	–	4	0	
42	Carson McCullough	Ireland	2023	2023	2	18	14	9.00	48	1	1/64	64.00	0	0	
43	Gavin Roulston	Ireland	2024	2026	16	289	64	19.26	66	0	–	–	2	0	
44	Kian Hilton	Ireland	2024	2024	5	24	14	4.80	0	–	–	–	1	0	
45	Marcello Piedt	South Africa	2024	2024	3	108	59	36.00	108	2	2/43	60.00	0	0	
46	David O'Sullivan	Australia	2024	2025	6	16	15	8.00	217	8	2/27	25.12	2	0	
47	Sam Topping †	Ireland	2025	2025	5	304	120	60.80	0	–	–	–	6	1	
48	Andrew Balbirnie	Ireland	2025	2026	9	490	101	70.00	0	–	–	–	7	0	
49	Jake Egan	Ireland	2025	2026	10	288	85	28.80	0	–	–	–	3	0	
50	Josh Wilson	Ireland	2025	2025	3	2	2*	—	120	1	1/62	131.00	0	0	
51	Robbie Millar	Ireland	2025	2025	3	–	–	–	84	5	3/69	20.80	2	0	
52	Billy Dougherty †	Ireland	2025	2025	1	–	–	–	0	–	–	–	0	0	
53	Ben Calitz †	Ireland	2026	2026	5	179	54	44.75	0	–	–	–	4	1	
54	Gareth Delany	Ireland	2026	2026	5	57	28	14.25	126	0	–	–	3	0	
55	Liam McCarthy	Ireland	2026	2026	5	52	33	17.33	244	6	2/52	57.16	3	0	
56	Hassan Shahid	Ireland	2026	2026	2	5	5	2.50	0	–	–	–	0	0	
57	Luke Marillier	Zimbabwe	2026	2026	1	9	9	9.00	0	–	–	–	0	0	

== See also ==
- List of North West Warriors first-class players
- List of North West Warriors Twenty20 players
- List of Irish first-class cricketers
