= List of North West Warriors Twenty20 players =

North West Warriors was formed in 2013 and became a Twenty20 team in 2017. They played their inaugural Twenty20 in the 2017 Inter-Provincial Trophy against Northern Knights. In total, 57 players have appeared in Twenty20 cricket for North West Warriors.

Andy McBrine is North West Warriors' leading run-scorer in Twenty20 cricket, aggregating 725 runs. Andrew Balbirnie has the highest score in the format for North West Warriors, with 102 not out scored in 2026 against Leinster Lightning. For players who have made five or more appearances, Sam Topping have the teams best batting average: 37.00. Among the bowlers, McBrine has taken more wickets than any other with 55. Craig Young has the best bowling figures in an innings: he claimed five wickets against Northern Knights in a 2017 match, while conceding 15 runs.

Players are initially listed in order of appearance; where players made their debut in the same match, they are initially listed by batting order.

== Key ==
General

- † – Wicket-keeper
- First – Year of Twenty20 debut for North West Warriors
- Last – Year of latest Twenty20 match for North West Warriors
- Mat – Number of Twenty20 appearances for North West Warriors

Batting

- Runs – Runs scored in career
- HS – Highest score
- Avg – Runs scored per dismissal
- * – Batsman remained not out

Bowling

- Balls – Balls bowled in career
- Wkt – Wickets taken in career
- BBI – Best bowling in an innings
- Ave – Average runs per wicket

Fielding

- Ca – Catches taken
- St – Stumpings effected
All statistics correct as of the end of the Irish 2026 cricket season.

== List of Twenty20 cricketers ==
North West Warriors Twenty20 players
No.	Name	Nationality	First	Last	Mat	Runs	HS	Avg	Balls	Wkt	BBI	Ave	Ca	St	Ref(s)
No.	Name	Nationality	First	Last	Mat	Batting			Bowling				Fielding		Ref(s)
1	Stuart Thompson	Ireland	2017	2020	15	221	43	15.78	256	12	2/20	29.08	11	0	
2	David Rankin †	Ireland	2017	2020	15	265	67	17.66	0	–	–	–	5	1	
3	Irosh Samarasooriya	Sri Lanka	2017	2017	2	9	5	4.50	6	0	–	–	1	0	
4	William McClintock	Ireland	2017	2026	24	257	54	14.27	24	0	–	–	6	0	
5	Andy McBrine	Ireland	2017	2026	56	725	52*	21.96	966	55	3/7	20.18	23	0	
6	Johnny Thompson	Ireland	2017	2017	4	86	39	28.66	60	4	2/19	19.00	2	0	
7	Rickie-Lee Dougherty †	Ireland	2017	2018	8	46	24*	23.00	0	–	–	–	11	1	
8	Steve Vijay Lazars	Ireland	2017	2017	4	28	15	28.00	66	4	2/27	15.50	0	0	
9	Andrew Britton	Ireland	2017	2018	7	2	2*	1.00	145	6	2/24	13.71	0	0	
10	Jonathan Robinson	Ireland	2017	2017	3	6	6	6.00	30	1	1/20	34.00	0	0	
11	Craig Young	Ireland	2017	2026	35	63	17*	5.72	675	52	5/15	18.88	11	0	
12	Imran Butt	Pakistan	2017	2017	1	0	0	0.00	0	–	–	–	1	0	
13	Aaron Gillespie	Ireland	2017	2023	13	199	80*	18.09	0	–	–	–	2	0	
14	Graham Kennedy	Ireland	2017	2022	27	207	38*	14.78	366	23	3/15	20.47	11	0	
15	David Scanlon	Ireland	2017	2018	6	–	–	–	90	7	3/19	19.00	2	0	
16	Ross Allen	Ireland	2017	2021	18	27	12*	13.50	127	5	3/19	28.40	8	0	
17	David Barr	Ireland	2017	2017	1	41	41	41.00	0	–	–	–	1	0	
18	Aaron Heywood	Ireland	2017	2017	1	–	–	–	12	0	–	–	0	0	
19	William Porterfield	Ireland	2018	2021	17	459	61*	30.60	0	–	–	–	5	0	
20	Rishi Chopra	Ireland	2018	2018	3	17	9	8.50	6	0	–	–	1	0	
21	Marcus Poskitt †	Ireland	2018	2018	2	–	–	–	0	–	–	–	1	1	
22	Varun Chopra	Ireland	2018	2020	4	0	0	0.00	12	0	–	–	0	0	
23	Adam McDaid	Ireland	2019	2019	1	6	6	6.00	0	–	–	–	1	0	
24	Kyle Magee	Ireland	2019	2021	2	5	3	2.50	0	–	–	–	2	0	
25	Boyd Rankin	Ireland	2019	2020	2	1	1	1.00	36	2	2/18	21.50	0	0	
26	Nathan McGuire	Ireland	2020	2022	16	193	71	12.86	8	0	–	–	7	0	
27	Will Smale †	Wales	2020	2020	3	7	6	2.33	0	–	–	–	3	0	
28	Graham Hume	Ireland	2020	2025	36	369	52	16.77	748	46	3/18	20.73	8	0	
29	Ryan Hunter	Ireland	2020	2020	1	37	37	37.00	0	–	–	–	0	0	
30	Stephen Doheny †	Ireland	2021	2024	29	723	84	27.80	0	–	–	–	15	3	
31	Shane Getkate	Ireland	2021	2024	26	361	55	18.05	150	6	2/22	41.50	16	0	
32	Jared Wilson	Ireland	2021	2026	38	539	72*	18.58	279	14	4/15	33.21	9	0	
33	Ryan MacBeth	Ireland	2021	2026	35	64	24	10.66	564	24	2/11	34.87	6	0	
34	Conor Olphert	Ireland	2021	2024	8	8	8	8.00	146	11	3/27	18.09	1	0	
35	Trent McKeegan	Ireland	2022	2026	16	2	2*	1.00	236	21	4/24	15.14	3	0	
36	Dharm Singh	Ireland	2022	2022	2	3	3	1.50	0	–	–	–	0	0	
37	Scott MacBeth	Ireland	2022	2026	34	512	40*	20.48	240	13	3/17	29.07	20	0	
38	Cameron Melly	Ireland	2023	2025	21	217	40	16.69	0	–	–	–	9	0	
39	Cian Robertson	Ireland	2023	2023	6	10	5*	10.00	130	10	4/20	11.60	1	0	
40	Harry Zimmermann	Ireland	2023	2023	6	16	12*	—	66	2	1/16	56.00	1	0	
41	Liam Doherty	Ireland	2023	2024	10	87	33	10.87	12	1	1/27	27.00	1	0	
42	Kian Hilton †	Ireland	2024	2024	7	66	25	11.00	0	–	–	–	1	0	
43	Gavin Roulston	Ireland	2024	2026	14	215	57	19.54	0	–	–	–	2	0	
44	Marcello Piedt	South Africa	2024	2024	3	13	8	13.00	24	2	2/20	25.00	1	0	
45	David O'Sullivan	Australia	2024	2025	10	55	26*	13.75	156	8	2/32	32.75	5	0	
46	Sam Topping †	Ireland	2025	2025	11	370	83	37.00	0	–	–	–	7	3	
47	Andrew Balbirnie	Ireland	2025	2026	16	488	102*	32.53	0	–	–	–	8	0	
48	Jake Egan	Ireland	2025	2026	14	372	87*	33.81	0	–	–	–	9	0	
49	Josh Wilson	Ireland	2025	2025	9	5	5	1.66	96	2	1/27	87.00	0	0	
50	Robbie Millar	Ireland	2025	2025	10	12	4*	3.00	132	13	3/17	14.15	2	0	
51	Isaac Bird	Ireland	2025	2025	1	1	1	1.00	12	1	1/17	17.00	0	0	
52	Liam McCarthy	Ireland	2026	2026	5	12	11*	12.00	106	8	2/31	22.50	2	0	
53	Melvin Deveraj	Ireland	2026	2026	3	4	4	4.00	42	1	1/43	94.00	2	0	
54	Gareth Delany	Ireland	2026	2026	4	170	56	56.66	78	7	3/29	17.57	3	0	
55	Ben Calitz †	Ireland	2026	2026	3	38	17	12.66	0	–	–	–	4	0	
56	Hassan Shahid	Ireland	2026	2026	2	9	6*	9.00	0	–	–	–	0	0	
57	Alastair Doherty	Ireland	2026	2026	1	–	–	–	0	–	–	–	0	0	

== See also ==
- List of North West Warriors first-class players
- List of North West Warriors List A players
