= List of North West Warriors first-class players =

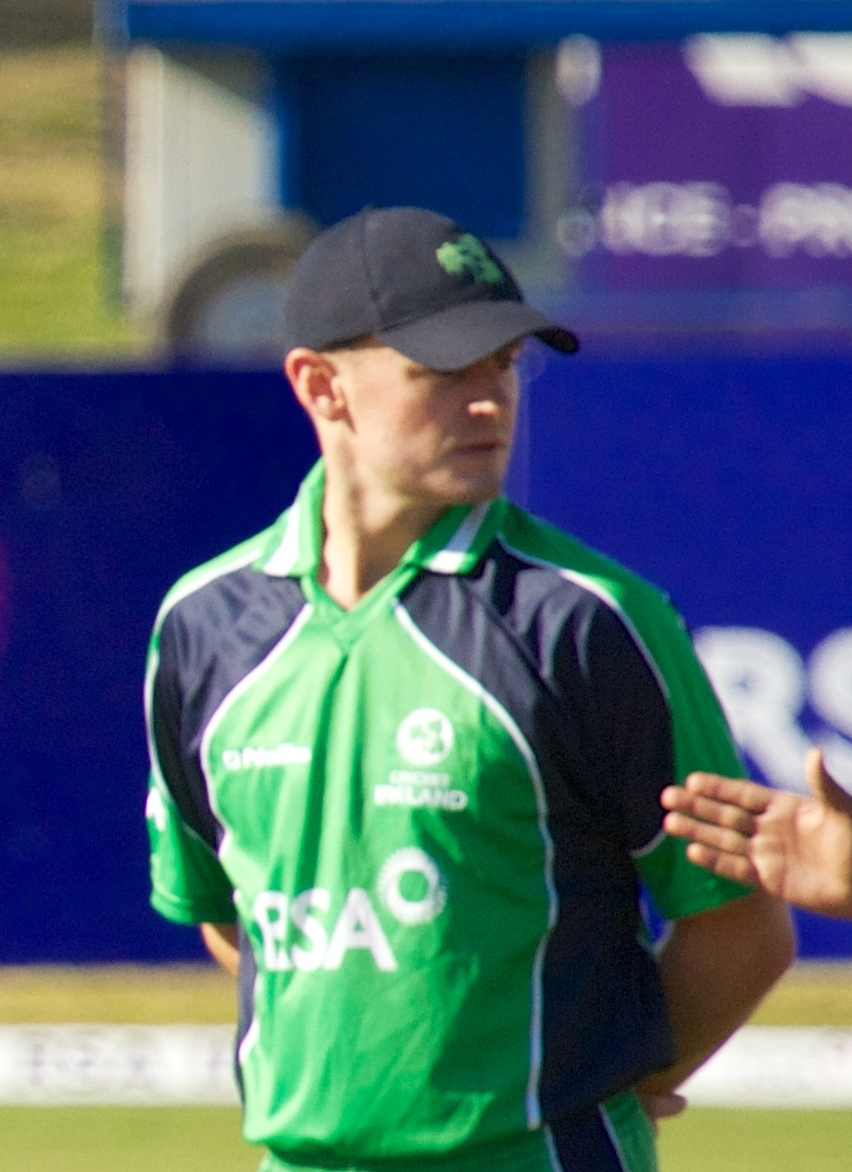
William Porterfield (pictured) has the highest first-class score for North West Warriors with 207.

North West Warriors was formed in 2013 and became a first-class team in 2017. They played their inaugural first-class match in the 2017 Inter-Provincial Championship against Northern Knights. North West Warriors have won the Interprovincial Championship once, in 2018. In total, 25 players have appeared in first-class cricket for North West Warriors, with two players having played in all 11 first-class fixtures played by North West Warriors.

William Porterfield is North West Warriors leading run-scorer in first-class cricket, aggregating 581 runs. Three batsmen have scored a century for North West Warriors in the format: Niall O'Brien, Porterfield and Stuart Thompson. Porterfield's score of 207, scored in 2018 against Leinster Lightning is the highest score by a North West Warriors batsman, and Porterfield also has the teams best batting average: 72.62. Among the bowlers, Craig Young has taken more wickets than any other, claiming 37 – six wickets more than that of the second most prolific bowler, David Scanlon. Scanlon also has the best bowling figures in an innings: he claimed five wickets against Northern Knights in a 2017 match, while conceding 29 runs. O'Brien has kept wicket in six of North West Warriors 11 first-class matches, taking 14 catches.

Players are initially listed in order of appearance; where players made their debut in the same match, they are initially listed by batting order.

== Key ==
General

- † – Wicket-keeper
- First – Year of first-class debut for North West Warriors
- Last – Year of latest first-class match for North West Warriors
- Mat – Number of first-class appearances for North West Warriors

Batting

- Runs – Runs scored in career
- HS – Highest score
- Avg – Runs scored per dismissal
- * – Batsman remained not out

Bowling

- Balls – Balls bowled in career
- Wkt – Wickets taken in career
- BBI – Best bowling in an innings
- Ave – Average runs per wicket

Fielding

- Ca – Catches taken
- St – Stumpings effected
All statistics correct as of the end of the Irish 2019 cricket season.

== List of first-class cricketers ==
North West Warriors first-class players
No.	Name	Nationality	First	Last	Mat	Runs	HS	Avg	Balls	Wkt	BBI	Ave	Ca	St	Ref(s)
No.	Name	Nationality	First	Last	Mat	Batting			Bowling				Fielding		Ref(s)
1	Imran Butt	Pakistan	2017	2017	2	66	23	22.00	36	0	–	–	1	0	
2	David Rankin †	Ireland	2017	2019	11	315	86	21.00	0	–	–	–	12	0	
3	Irosh Samarasooriya	Sri Lanka	2017	2017	2	40	20*	13.33	0	–	–	–	2	0	
4	Stuart Thompson	Ireland	2017	2019	9	390	148	30.00	942	18	3/32	29.44	3	0	
5	Niall McDonnell	Ireland	2017	2017	1	30	30	30.00	0	–	–	–	2	0	
6	Andy McBrine	Ireland	2017	2019	11	290	77	20.71	1,103	12	4/35	35.25	12	0	
7	Aaron Gillespie	Ireland	2017	2019	9	250	57	20.83	60	2	2/12	13.50	5	0	
8	Rickie-Lee Dougherty †	Ireland	2017	2017	1	1	1	1.00	0	–	–	–	6	0	
9	Ross Allen	Ireland	2017	2019	10	289	81	22.23	294	3	1/9	49.33	3	0	
10	Craig Young	Ireland	2017	2019	10	80	23	11.42	1,294	37	5/37	18.29	1	0	
11	David Scanlon	Ireland	2017	2019	10	118	62*	19.66	1,040	31	5/29	21.77	2	0	
12	Andrew Austin †	Ireland	2017	2017	2	0	0	0.00	0	–	–	–	1	0	
13	Niall O'Brien †	Ireland	2017	2018	6	489	165	48.90	0	–	–	–	14	0	
14	Johnny Thompson	Ireland	2017	2017	3	38	25	7.60	222	4	3/61	34.75	1	0	
15	Steve Vijay Lazars	Ireland	2017	2017	2	96	62	32.00	120	3	3/54	25.33	1	0	
16	David Barr	Ireland	2017	2018	6	138	42*	15.33	0	–	–	–	2	0	
17	Reece Kelly	Ireland	2017	2017	1	27	22*	27.00	25	–	–	–	0	0	
18	Ryan MacBeth	Ireland	2017	2019	2	14	14	14.00	66	1	1/24	26.00	0	0	
19	William Porterfield	Ireland	2018	2019	7	581	207	72.62	0	–	–	–	10	0	
20	Boyd Rankin	Ireland	2018	2019	2	21	21	10.50	246	5	2/42	26.80	2	0	
21	Graham Kennedy	Ireland	2018	2019	6	154	73*	25.66	352	9	3/36	18.00	2	0	
22	Brendon Louw †	South Africa	2019	2019	2	23	23	23.00	0	–	–	–	1	0	
23	Kyle Magee	Ireland	2019	2019	1	26	26	26.00	0	–	–	–	0	0	
24	Graham Hume	Ireland	2019	2019	3	74	54*	37.00	160	3	3/34	21.33	1	0	
25	Will Smale †	Wales	2019	2019	1	0	0	0.00	0	–	–	–	5	0	

== See also ==
- List of North West Warriors List A players
- List of North West Warriors Twenty20 players
- List of Irish first-class cricketers
