= 2019 Inter-Provincial Cup =

Cricket tournament

- Dates: 23 April – 26 August 2019
- Administrator: Cricket Ireland
- Cricket format: List A
- Tournament format: Round-robin
- Champions: Leinster Lightning (6th title)
- Participants: 3
- Matches: 9
- Most runs: Andy Balbirnie (350)
- Most wickets: Harry Tector (10); Shane Getkate (10)

The 2019 Inter-Provincial Cup was the seventh edition of the Inter-Provincial Cup, a List A cricket competition for teams from Ireland. It was the third edition of the competition to be played with List A status. Leinster Lightning were the defending champions.

Unlike previous editions of the tournament, an extra round of matches took place outside of the normal domestic calendar, with matches played at the La Manga Club Ground, Spain, in April 2019. The tournament was originally scheduled to start on 22 April 2019, but was postponed by 24 hours due to heavy rain. However, the opening fixture was abandoned without a ball being bowled due to a wet outfield.

Leinster Lightning retained their title, after their match on 22 August 2019 against the North West Warriors was abandoned due to rain.

== Points table ==
The following teams competed:

Team	Pld	W	L	T	NR	Pts
Leinster Lightning	6	3	1	0	2	18
Northern Knights	6	3	3	0	0	14
North West Warriors	6	1	3	0	2	8

== Fixtures ==
=== 1st match ===
23 April 2019
Scorecard

Leinster Lightning	v	North West Warriors

Match abandoned
La Manga Club Ground, Spain
Umpires: Paul Reynolds and Roland Black

- No toss.
- No play was possible due to a wet outfield.
- Points: Leinster Lightning 2, North West Warriors 2.

=== 2nd match ===
24 April 2019
Scorecard

Northern Knights; 265/6 (36 overs)	v	North West Warriors; 147 (29.1 overs)
Marc Ellison 87 (91); Stuart Thompson 4/55 (8 overs)		Andrew Britton 36* (33); Harry Tector 5/36 (6.1 overs)

Northern Knights won by 117 runs (DLS method)
La Manga Club Ground, Spain
Umpires: Roland Black and Alan Neill

- North West Warriors won the toss and elected to field.
- The match was reduced to 36 overs per side due to a wet outfield.
- Andrew Austin (North West Warriors) made his List A debut.
- Points: Northern Knights 5, North West Warriors 0.

=== 3rd match ===
25 April 2019
Scorecard

Northern Knights; 290/8 (50 overs)	v	Leinster Lightning; 294/4 (46.5 overs)
Marc Ellison 85 (112); George Dockrell 3/42 (10 overs)		Andy Balbirnie 125 (126); Graeme McCarter 2/33 (10 overs)

Leinster Lightning won by 6 wickets
La Manga Club Ground, Spain
Umpires: Paul Reynolds and Alan Neill

- Northern Knights won the toss and elected to bat.
- Points: Leinster Lightning 4, Northern Knights 0.

=== 4th match ===
23 May 2019
Scorecard

Leinster Lightning; 271/5 (50 overs)	v	North West Warriors; 193 (48 overs)
Jack Tector 110 (141); Graham Hume 3/48 (10 overs)		David Rankin 55 (67); George Dockrell 4/41 (8 overs)

Leinster Lightning won by 78 runs
Bready Cricket Club Ground, Bready
Umpires: Michael Foster and Roland Black

- Leinster Lightning won the toss and elected to bat.
- Marcus Poskitt (North West Warriors) and Fionn Hand (Leinster Lightning) both made their List A debuts.
- Points: Leinster Lightning 5, North West Warriors 0.
- Jack Tector (Leinster Lightning) scored his first century in List A cricket.

=== 5th match ===
27 May 2019
Scorecard

North West Warriors; 188 (50 overs)	v	Northern Knights; 107/8 (20 overs)
Aaron Gillespie 54 (97); Shane Getkate 4/28 (7 overs)		Gary Wilson 40 (34); Aaron Gillespie 2/14 (2 overs)

North West Warriors won by 3 runs (DLS method)
Stormont, Belfast
Umpires: Jareth McCready and Alan Neill

- North West Warriors won the toss and elected to bat.
- Northern Knights were set a revised target of 111 runs from 20 overs due to rain.
- Adam McDaid and Gregory McFaul (North West Warriors) both made their List A debuts.
- Points: North West Warriors 4, Northern Knights 0.

=== 6th match ===
27 June 2019
Scorecard

Leinster Lightning; 114 (35.3 overs)	v	Northern Knights; 115/3 (21.5 overs)
Simi Singh 44 (65); Jacob Mulder 3/5 (2.3 overs)		Harry Tector 35* (42); Peter Chase 2/36 (7 overs)

Northern Knights won by 7 wickets
Pembroke Cricket Club, Dublin
Umpires: Philip Thompson and Alan Neill

- Leinster Lightning won the toss and elected to bat.
- Points: Northern Knights 5, Leinster Lightning 0.

=== 7th match ===
20 August 2019
Scorecard

Northern Knights; 176 (42.2 overs)	v	Leinster Lightning; 179/3 (32.4 overs)
Mark Adair 40 (39); Tyrone Kane 6/42 (8.2 overs)		Andy Balbirnie 90 (94); Mark Adair 2/41 (8.4 overs)

Leinster Lightning won by 7 wickets
Stormont, Belfast
Umpires: Mark Hawthorne and Deighton Butler

- Leinster Lightning won the toss and elected to field.
- Josh Manley and Matthew Foster (Northern Knights) both made their List A debuts.
- Points: Leinster Lightning 5, Northern Knights 0.

=== 8th match ===
22 August 2019
Scorecard

Leinster Lightning	v	North West Warriors

Match abandoned
Merrion Cricket Club Ground, Dublin
Umpires: Deighton Butler and Mary Waldron

- No toss.
- No play was possible due to a wet outfield.
- Points: Leinster Lightning 2, North West Warriors 2.

=== 9th match ===
26 August 2019
Scorecard

Northern Knights; 245/8 (50 overs)	v	North West Warriors; 243 (49.5 overs)
Ruhan Pretorius 96 (124); Graham Kennedy 3/48 (10 overs)		Stuart Thompson 59 (59); Shane Getkate 3/52 (8.5 overs)

Northern Knights won by 2 runs
Woodvale Road, Eglinton
Umpires: Roland Black and Deighton Butler

- Northern Knights won the toss and elected to bat.
- Will Smale (North West Warriors) made his List A debut.
- Points: Northern Knights 4, North West Warriors 0.
