= List of Leinster Lightning List A players =

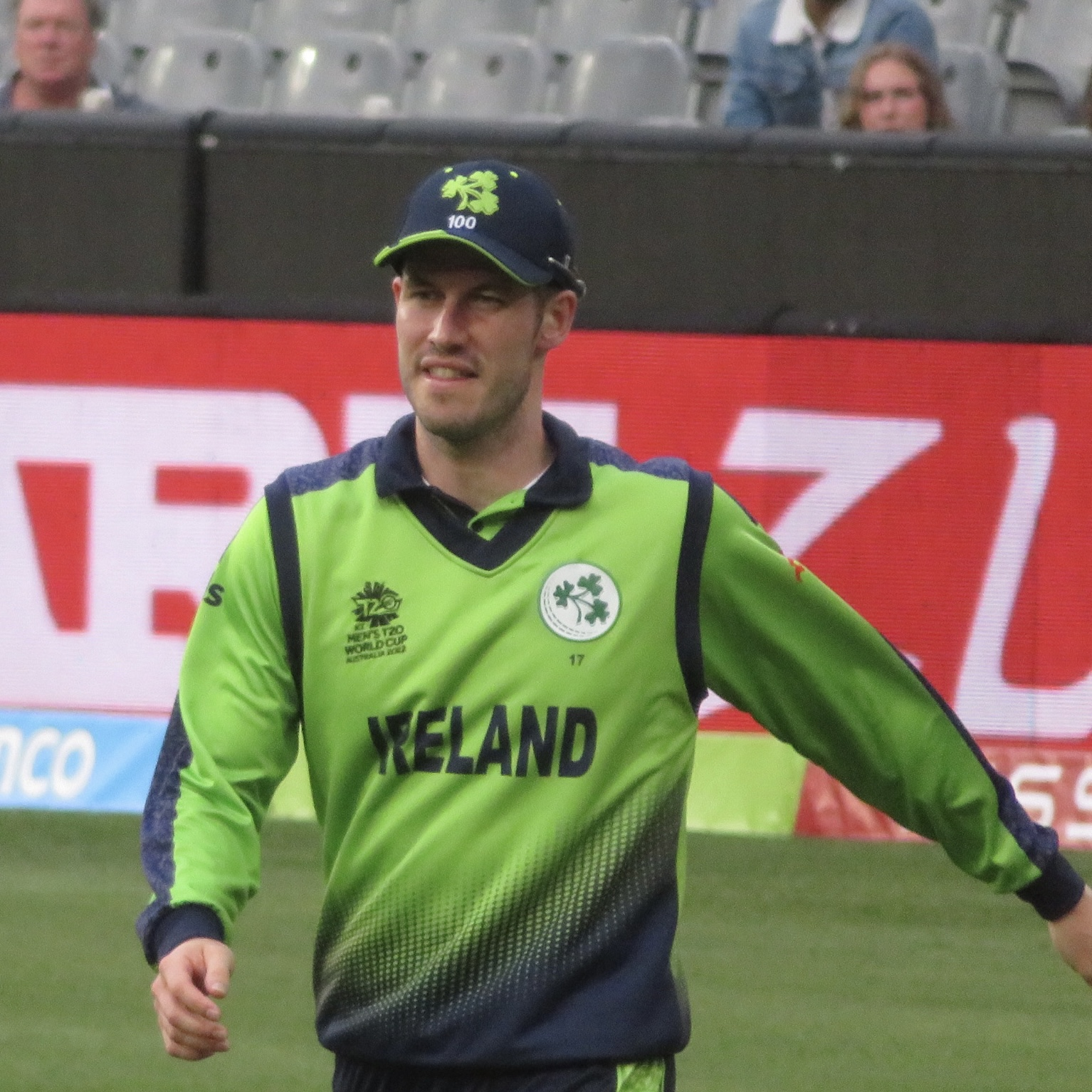
George Dockrell (pictured) has scored the second most runs (1,183) and taken the most wickets (56) for Leinster Lightning in List A cricket.

Leinster Lightning was formed in 2013 and became a List A team in 2017. They played their inaugural List A match in the 2017 Inter-Provincial Cup against North West Warriors. Leinster Lightning have won the Interprovincial Cup eleven times, eight with List A status. In total, 54 players have appeared in List A cricket for Leinster Lightning.

Lorcan Tucker is Leinster Lightning's leading run-scorer in List A cricket, aggregating 1,268 runs. Twelve batsmen have scored a century for Leinster Lightning in the format: Ed Joyce, Simi Singh, Andrew Balbirnie, Jack Tector, Lorcan Tucker, Christopher De Freitas, Harry Tector, Barry McCarthy, Seamus Lynch, George Dockrell, Stephen Doheny and Tim Tector. De Freitas' score of 143 not out is the highest score by a Leinster Lightning batsman, while Joyce has the teams best batting average: 62.66. Among the bowlers, Dockrell has taken more wickets than any other, claiming 56 – ten wickets more than that of the second most prolific bowler Gavin Hoey. Hoey has the best bowling figures in an innings: he claimed six wickets, while conceding 26 runs. Lorcan Tucker has kept wicket in 40 of Leinster Lightning's 48 List A matches, taking 61 catches and effecting 9 stumpings.

Players are initially listed in order of appearance; where players made their debut in the same match, they are initially listed by batting order.

== Key ==
General

- † – Wicket-keeper
- First – Year of List A debut for Leinster Lightning
- Last – Year of latest List A match for Leinster Lightning
- Mat – Number of List A appearances for Leinster Lightning

Batting

- Runs – Runs scored in career
- HS – Highest score
- Avg – Runs scored per dismissal
- * – Batsman remained not out

Bowling

- Balls – Balls bowled in career
- Wkt – Wickets taken in career
- BBI – Best bowling in an innings
- Ave – Average runs per wicket

Fielding

- Ca – Catches taken
- St – Stumpings effected
All statistics correct as of the end of the Irish 2026 cricket season.

== List of List A cricketers ==
Leinster Lightning List A players
No.	Name	Nationality	First	Last	Mat	Runs	HS	Avg	Balls	Wkt	BBI	Ave	Ca	St	Ref(s)
No.	Name	Nationality	First	Last	Mat	Batting			Bowling				Fielding		Ref(s)
1	Ed Joyce	Ireland	2017	2017	3	188	116	62.66	0	–	–	–	4	0	
2	Sean Terry	Ireland	2017	2018	4	68	32	22.66	0	–	–	–	2	0	
3	John Anderson	Ireland	2017	2018	8	191	75	27.28	90	1	1/8	55.00	2	0	
4	Andrew Balbirnie	Ireland	2017	2024	23	963	126	53.50	12	0	–	–	14	0	
5	Kevin O'Brien	Ireland	2017	2021	20	468	75	31.20	217	8	3/34	17.50	8	0	
6	Simi Singh	Ireland	2017	2023	31	637	121*	30.33	1,222	34	4/39	26.23	10	0	
7	Eddie Richardson	Ireland	2017	2018	5	16	7	5.33	162	1	1/36	115.00	0	0	
8	Tyrone Kane	Ireland	2017	2020	13	143	57	17.87	410	13	6/42	23.30	2	0	
9	George Dockrell	Ireland	2017	2026	45	1,183	101*	59.15	1,486	56	5/21	21.33	26	0	
10	Jamie Grassi †	Italy	2017	2021	6	158	82	31.60	0	–	–	–	1	0	
11	Peter Chase	Ireland	2017	2021	22	8	3*	2.66	910	25	3/37	30.16	2	0	
11	Jack Tector	Ireland	2017	2023	21	479	110	23.95	0	–	–	–	5	0	
12	Lorcan Tucker †	Ireland	2017	2026	43	1,268	133	40.90	0	–	–	–	61	9	
13	Bobby Gamble	England	2017	2017	1	0	0*	–	0	–	–	–	0	0	
14	Max Sorensen	Ireland	2017	2018	2	0	0	0.00	54	3	3/49	16.33	1	0	
15	David Delany	Ireland	2017	2026	18	279	76	31.00	505	14	2/46	38.14	1	0	
16	Josh Little	Ireland	2018	2022	16	48	22	16.00	631	19	3/32	23.78	3	0	
17	Stephen Doheny	Ireland	2018	2026	14	572	128	52.00	0	–	–	–	3	0	
18	Barry McCarthy	Ireland	2019	2025	22	369	110	36.90	974	35	6/39	19.74	5	0	
19	Fionn Hand	Ireland	2019	2024	11	130	40*	21.66	462	16	4/59	30.43	0	0	
21	Curtis Campher	Ireland	2020	2026	8	142	59*	35.50	312	13	4/46	20.38	3	0	
22	Greg Ford	South Africa	2020	2023	9	102	43	17.00	0	–	–	–	1	0	
23	Rory Anders	Ireland	2020	2022	2	–	–	–	48	0	–	–	0	0	
24	Jonathan Garth	Ireland	2021	2021	2	–	–	–	12	1	1/14	14.00	1	0	
25	David O'Halloran	Ireland	2021	2021	4	2	2*	–	233	8	4/44	19.75	0	0	
26	Tim Tector	Ireland	2021	2026	28	631	122	23.37	12	1	1/3	16.00	10	0	
27	Harry Tector	Ireland	2022	2026	20	570	120	40.71	282	7	3/26	29.57	9	0	
28	Jack Carty	Ireland	2022	2022	3	23	23	23.00	48	0	–	–	3	0	
29	Mitchell Thompson	Ireland	2022	2022	1	–	–	–	0	–	–	–	0	0	
30	Muzamil Sherzad	Ireland	2022	2022	1	–	–	–	18	0	–	–	0	0	
31	Theo Dempsey	Ireland	2022	2022	1	–	–	–	27	0	–	–	0	0	
32	Mikey O'Reilly	Ireland	2022	2024	6	2	1*	2.00	136	4	2/41	35.00	0	0	
33	Gavin Hoey	Ireland	2022	2026	27	341	40	26.23	1,177	46	6/26	24.13	8	0	
34	Cormac McLoughlin-Gavin	Ireland	2022	2023	3	72	67	24.00	0	–	–	–	1	0	
35	Amish Sidhu	India	2022	2024	4	10	9	3.33	120	5	2/24	23.00	0	0	
36	Adam Rosslee	South Africa	2023	2023	2	3	2	1.50	0	–	–	–	1	0	
37	Mark Donegan †	Ireland	2023	2023	3	109	87	36.33	0	–	–	–	6	1	
38	Reuben Wilson	Ireland	2023	2025	11	44	21	14.66	430	21	5/42	17.23	5	0	
39	Samuel Harbinson	Ireland	2023	2024	9	140	48*	28.00	158	3	2/25	42.66	3	0	
40	Christopher De Freitas	Portugal	2023	2026	20	721	143*	45.06	0	–	–	–	14	0	
41	Seamus Lynch †	Ireland	2023	2025	9	187	107	31.16	0	–	–	–	11	1	
42	Sean McNicholl	Ireland	2023	2023	1	0	0*	—	36	1	1/4	20.00	1	0	
43	Swapnil Modgill	India	2024	2024	3	38	18	19.00	0	–	–	–	0	0	
44	Philippe le Roux	Ireland	2024	2024	1	0	0	0.00	0	–	–	–	1	0	
45	Dylan Lues	South Africa	2024	2024	3	14	14*	—	60	0	–	–	1	0	
46	Jack Lalor	Ireland	2024	2024	1	–	–	–	6	0	–	–	0	0	
47	Monil Patel	India	2024	2024	1	10	10	10.00	0	–	–	–	0	0	
48	John McNally	Ireland	2024	2024	2	10	10	10.00	36	3	2/20	15.33	1	0	
49	Melvin Deveraj	Ireland	2024	2025	4	4	2*	4.00	126	6	3/30	21.16	1	0	
50	Sam Willemse	Ireland	2024	2024	1	–	–	–	24	1	1/28	28.00	0	0	
51	Jai Moondra	Ireland	2025	2026	9	17	5*	8.50	425	14	3/42	30.57	1	0	
52	Nasir Totakhil	Afghanistan	2025	2025	3	21	21	21.00	102	3	2/15	24.33	1	0	
53	Matt Hollard	Ireland	2025	2025	3	11	11	11.00	110	7	5/62	15.57	0	0	
54	Byron McDonough	Ireland	2026	2026	5	–	–	–	251	8	4/50	31.25	0	0	

== See also ==
- List of Leinster Lightning first-class players
- List of Leinster Lightning Twenty20 players
