= List of Leinster Lightning Twenty20 players =

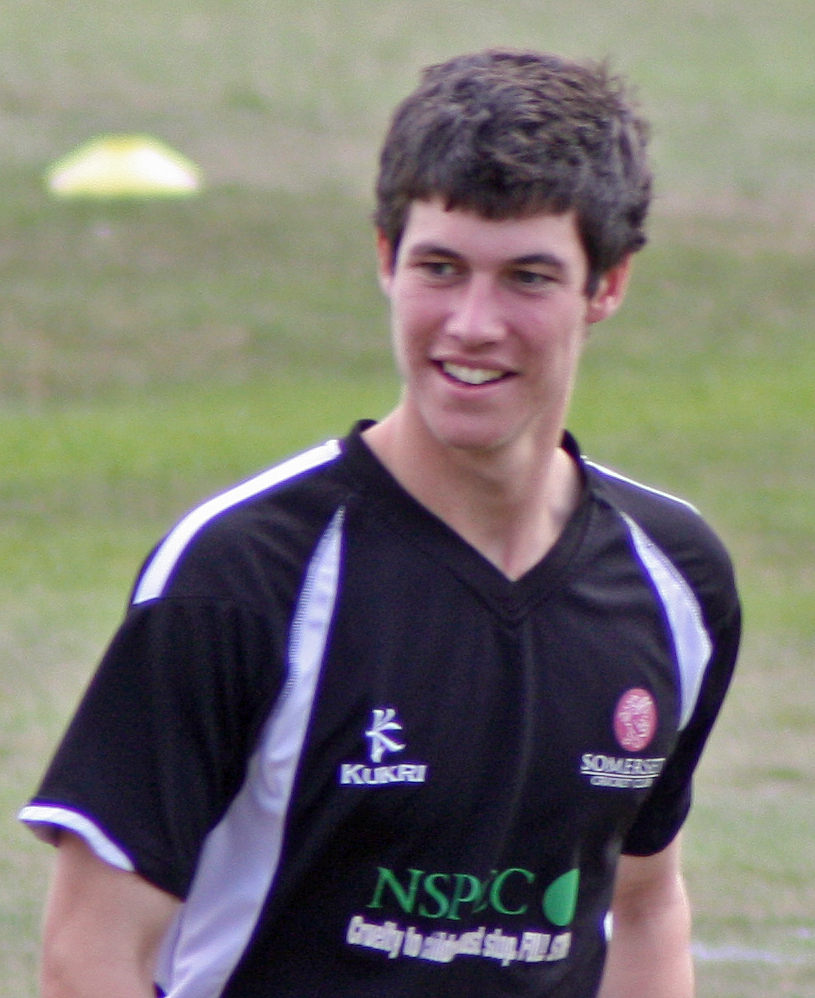
George Dockrell (pictured) has taken the most wickets for Leinster Lightning in Twenty20 cricket, with 50.

Leinster Lightning was formed in 2013 and became a Twenty20 team in 2017. They played their first Twenty20 match in the 2017 Inter-Provincial Trophy against North West Warriors. In total, 62 players have appeared in Twenty20 cricket for Leinster Lightning.

Players are initially listed in order of appearance; where players made their debut in the same match, they are initially listed by batting order.

== Key ==
General

- † – Wicket-keeper
- First – Year of Twenty20 debut for Leinster Lightning
- Last – Year of latest Twenty20 match for Leinster Lightning
- Mat – Number of Twenty20 appearances for Leinster Lightning

Batting

- Runs – Runs scored in career
- HS – Highest score
- Avg – Runs scored per dismissal
- * – Batsman remained not out

Bowling

- Balls – Balls bowled in career
- Wkt – Wickets taken in career
- BBI – Best bowling in an innings
- Ave – Average runs per wicket

Fielding

- Ca – Catches taken
- St – Stumpings effected
All statistics correct as of the end of the Irish 2026 cricket season.

== List of Twenty20 cricketers ==
Leinster Lightning Twenty20 players
No.	Name	Nationality	First	Last	Mat	Runs	HS	Avg	Balls	Wkt	BBI	Ave	Ca	St	Ref(s)
No.	Name	Nationality	First	Last	Mat	Batting			Bowling				Fielding		Ref(s)
1	Andrew Balbirnie	Ireland	2017	2024	31	968	81*	35.85	0	–	–	–	13	0	
2	Gareth Delany	Ireland	2017	2020	13	316	77	24.30	108	8	3/8	11.37	2	0	
3	Simi Singh	Ireland	2017	2023	33	765	109	27.32	643	46	4/18	15.84	12	0	
4	Kevin O'Brien	Ireland	2017	2021	20	335	82	17.63	84	5	2/14	19.60	8	0	
5	John Anderson	Ireland	2017	2018	12	183	76*	20.33	0	–	–	–	2	0	
6	Lorcan Tucker †	Ireland	2017	2026	54	1,021	77	27.59	0	–	–	–	38	14	
7	Max Sorensen	Ireland	2017	2017	6	141	98*	47.00	0	–	–	–	3	0	
8	George Dockrell	Ireland	2017	2026	52	760	69*	27.14	783	50	3/13	18.94	31	0	
9	Eddie Richardson	Ireland	2017	2018	10	39	18	7.80	179	14	4/25	15.07	3	0	
10	Bobby Gamble	England	2017	2017	4	6	5	6.00	66	4	2/20	23.75	1	0	
11	Peter Chase	Ireland	2017	2020	16	12	9*	12.00	303	20	4/11	16.80	8	0	
12	Tom Stanton	Ireland	2017	2018	3	–	–	–	60	4	2/30	18.50	2	0	
13	Andrew Sheridan	Ireland	2017	2018	4	17	17*	–	36	1	1/26	73.00	1	0	
14	Tyrone Kane	Ireland	2017	2020	15	113	26	16.14	234	23	5/22	11.78	5	0	
16	Sean Terry	Ireland	2017	2018	5	18	33*	21.00	0	–	–	–	3	0	
17	Stephen Doheny	Ireland	2017	2026	10	111	42	13.87	0	–	–	–	2	0	
18	Josh Little	Ireland	2017	2026	20	74	27*	37.00	422	26	3/8	18.34	12	0	
19	Joe Carroll	Australia	2018	2023	4	3	3	3.00	54	4	2/10	21.00	1	0	
20	Fionn Hand	Ireland	2018	2026	20	76	25*	19.00	366	21	3/22	24.85	13	0	
21	Matt Ford	South Africa	2019	2019	2	43	34*	43.00	0	–	–	–	1	0	
22	Rory Anders	Ireland	2019	2021	9	21	10	5.25	60	3	2/10	28.66	4	0	
23	Curtis Campher	Ireland	2020	2026	5	28	12*	14.00	78	2	1/20	63.00	2	0	
24	Greg Ford	South Africa	2020	2023	12	96	31	24.00	0	–	–	–	1	0	
25	James Newland	England	2020	2020	2	–	–	–	12	1	1/4	16.00	0	0	
26	Jonathan Garth	Ireland	2021	2021	4	15	10*	7.50	6	0	–	–	1	0	
27	Barry McCarthy	Ireland	2021	2025	29	122	27	11.09	627	47	5/3	17.06	11	0	
28	David O'Halloran	Ireland	2021	2021	7	9	6*	–	114	7	2/20	23.57	3	0	
29	Jamie Grassi	Italy	2021	2021	5	28	16*	9.33	0	–	–	–	3	0	
30	Tim Tector	Ireland	2021	2026	41	1,197	101	38.61	0	–	–	–	24	0	
31	Gavin Hoey	Ireland	2021	2026	34	147	39	10.50	693	44	4/25	20.02	11	0	
32	Jack Tector	Ireland	2021	2021	1	6	6	6.00	0	–	–	–	0	0	
33	Theo Lawson	Ireland	2021	2021	1	6	6	6.00	0	–	–	–	0	0	
34	Harry Tector	Ireland	2022	2026	28	696	59*	40.94	168	8	3/25	22.37	14	0	
35	Mikey O'Reilly	Ireland	2022	2023	9	2	1*	2.00	114	3	1/13	58.00	2	0	
36	Seamus Lynch †	Ireland	2022	2026	26	177	28*	14.75	0	–	–	–	7	1	
37	Adam Rosslee	South Africa	2023	2023	3	71	45	23.66	0	–	–	–	0	0	
38	Mark Donegan †	Ireland	2023	2023	5	80	58	16.00	0	–	–	–	1	0	
39	Samuel Harbinson	Ireland	2023	2024	14	146	45*	18.25	199	10	3/24	29.00	4	0	
40	Amish Sidhu	India	2023	2024	8	11	8	5.50	90	6	2/28	18.33	4	0	
41	Reuben Wilson	Ireland	2023	2025	13	0	0*	—	217	12	3/14	30.00	5	0	
42	Riley Mudford	Ireland	2023	2023	2	65	55	32.50	0	–	–	–	0	0	
43	David Delany	Ireland	2023	2026	14	39	24	19.50	210	11	4/19	25.18	4	0	
44	John McNally	Ireland	2024	2024	3	33	17*	—	46	2	1/9	19.50	0	0	
45	Oliver Riley	Ireland	2024	2024	2	–	–	–	30	0	–	–	1	0	
46	Swapnil Modgill	India	2024	2024	3	16	11	8.00	0	–	–	–	0	0	
47	Christopher De Freitas	Portugal	2024	2026	19	500	78	33.33	0	–	–	–	12	0	
48	Nicolas Stapleton	Ireland	2024	2024	1	–	–	–	18	0	–	–	1	0	
49	Dylan Lues	South Africa	2024	2025	4	25	16*	25.00	54	4	3/24	18.25	0	0	
50	Jack Lalor	Ireland	2024	2024	1	–	–	–	0	–	–	–	0	0	
51	Monil Patel	India	2024	2024	1	47	47	47.00	0	–	–	–	0	0	
52	Jai Moondra	Ireland	2024	2026	6	13	7	6.50	116	13	3/17	12.15	2	0	
53	Melvin Deveraj	Ireland	2024	2025	9	8	8	8.00	148	7	3/21	29.85	2	0	
54	Macdara Cosgrave	Ireland	2025	2025	1	29	29	29.00	0	–	–	–	0	0	
55	Younas Ahmadzai	Afghanistan	2025	2025	1	1	1	1.00	0	–	–	–	0	0	
56	Jordan Hollard	Ireland	2025	2025	1	18	18	18.00	12	0	–	–	2	0	
57	Abidullah Taniwal	Afghanistan	2025	2025	1	40	40	40.00	0	–	–	–	0	0	
58	Daniel Murray	Ireland	2025	2025	1	9	9	9.00	6	0	–	–	0	0	
59	Matt Hollard	Ireland	2025	2026	12	29	18	14.50	192	16	3/35	19.93	3	0	
60	Jeremy Martins	Portugal	2026	2026	2	13	13	13.00	0	–	–	–	1	0	
61	Ben White	Ireland	2026	2026	2	–	–	–	12	0	–	–	0	0	
62	Byron McDonough	Ireland	2026	2026	2	14	14*	—	37	1	1/33	71.00	0	0	

== See also ==
- List of Leinster Lightning first-class players
- List of Leinster Lightning List A players
