= 2018 Under-19 Cricket World Cup squads =

List of cricketers

The following squads were selected for the 2018 Under-19 Cricket World Cup. Any players born on or after 1 September 1998 were eligible to be selected for the competition. Bold indicates that a player went onto play senior international cricket.

== Group A ==
=== Kenya ===
Kenya's squad was announced on 15 December 2017:

Player	Date of Birth	Batting	Bowling style
**Sachin Bhudia** (c)	24 September 1998 (aged 19)	Right	Right-arm medium
Maxwel Ager	25 April 1999 (aged 18)	Left	Left-arm medium
Abhishekh Chidambaran	4 November 1999 (aged 18)	Right	Right-arm leg spin
Aveet Desai (wk)	23 January 2000 (aged 17)	Left	–
Jay Doshi	–	–	–
**Aman Gandhi**	5 May 2000 (aged 17)	Right	Right-arm off spin
Ankit Hirani (wk)	18 December 1999 (aged 18)	Right	Right-arm off spin
Jasraj Kundi	6 July 1999 (aged 18)	Right	Right-arm medium
Jayant Mepani	11 April 1999 (aged 18)	Left	Left-arm orthodox
Dennis Musyoka	10 May 1999 (aged 18)	Right	Right-arm off spin
Gerard Muthui	7 October 1999 (aged 18)	Right	Right-arm off spin
Thomas Ochieng	24 September 1998 (aged 19)	Right	Right-arm off spin
**Sukhdeep Singh**	11 February 2001 (aged 16)	Right	Right-arm off spin
Sidhart Vasudev	–	–	–
Rene Were	–	–	–

=== New Zealand ===
New Zealand's squad was announced on 12 December 2017:

Player	Date of Birth	Batting	Bowling style
Kaylum Boshier (c)	9 April 1999 (aged 18)	Right	Right-arm medium
**Finn Allen** (wk)	22 April 1999 (aged 18)	Right	–
Jakob Bhula	12 December 1999 (aged 18)	Right	Right-arm off spin
Max Chu	21 March 2000 (aged 17)	Left	–
Katene Clarke	21 September 1999 (aged 18)	Right	Right-arm medium-fast
**Matthew Fisher**	10 November 1999 (aged 18)	Right	Right-arm medium-fast
Luke Georgeson	14 April 1999 (aged 18)	Left	Right-arm medium-fast
Ben Lockrose	24 March 2000 (aged 17)	Right	Left-arm orthodox
Callum McLachlan (wk)	17 May 1999 (aged 18)	Right	–
Felix Murray	29 October 1998 (aged 19)	Left	Left-arm orthodox
Sandeep Patel	30 October 1998 (aged 19)	Right	Right-arm medium-fast
Dale Phillips	15 October 1998 (aged 19)	Right	Right-arm fast-medium
**Rachin Ravindra**	18 November 1999 (aged 18)	Left	Left-arm orthodox
Connor Sullivan	15 November 1998 (aged 19)	Right	Left-arm medium-fast
Todd Watson	5 December 1998 (aged 19)	Right	Right-arm medium-fast

=== South Africa ===
South Africa's squad was announced on 11 December 2017:

Player	Date of Birth	Batting	Bowling style
**Raynard van Tonder** (c)	26 September 1998 (aged 19)	Right	–
**Matthew Breetzke** (wk)	3 November 1998 (aged 19)	Right	–
**Gerald Coetzee**	2 October 2000 (aged 17)	Right	Right-arm fast
Jade de Klerk	24 February 1999 (aged 18)	Right	Left-arm orthodox
Jean du Plessis	24 November 1998 (aged 19)	Right	Right-arm medium
Fraser Jones	14 June 2000 (aged 17)	Right	Right-arm fast
Wandile Makwetu (wk)	7 January 1999 (aged 19)	Right	–
Akhona Mnyaka	22 June 1999 (aged 18)	Right	Left-arm fast
Andile Mokgakane	25 December 1999 (aged 18)	Right	Right-arm medium
Kgaudisa Molefe	9 February 2000 (aged 17)	Right	Left-arm orthodox
Jason Niemand	30 November 1998 (aged 19)	Right	Right-arm off spin
Thando Ntini	7 July 2000 (aged 17)	Left	Right-arm fast
Jiveshan Pillay	18 January 1999 (aged 18)	Left	–
Hermann Rolfes	17 August 1999 (aged 18)	Right	Right-arm medium
Kenan Smith	9 March 1999 (aged 18)	Right	Right-arm off spin

=== West Indies ===
West Indies' squad was announced on 24 November 2017:

Player	Date of Birth	Batting	Bowling style
Emmanuel Stewart (c)	23 August 1999 (aged 18)	Right	–
Kirstan Kallicharan (vc)	29 December 1999 (aged 18)	Right	Right-arm off spin
Ronaldo Alimohamed	3 October 1998 (aged 19)	Right	Right-arm fast-medium
**Alick Athanaze**	7 December 1998 (aged 19)	Left	Right-arm off spin
Brad Barnes	–	–	–
Cephas Cooper	11 July 1999 (aged 18)	Right	Right-arm off spin
Jarion Hoyte	–	–	–
Kimani Melius	–	–	–
Ashmead Nedd	–	–	–
Kian Pemberton	–	–	–
Raymond Perez	–	–	–
Joshua Persaud (wk)	29 February 2000 (aged 17)	Right	–
Jeavor Royal	2 December 1998 (aged 19)	Right	Left-arm orthodox
Keagan Simmons	26 March 1999 (aged 18)	Left	–
Bhaskar Yadram	18 September 1999 (aged 18)	Right	Right-arm medium-fast/Right-arm off spin
Nyeem Young	22 September 2000 (aged 17)	Right	Right-arm medium

During the group stage fixtures, Raymond Perez was injured, ruled out of the tournament and replaced by Brad Barnes. Joshua Persaud left the squad midway through the tournament, following the death of his mother.

== Group B ==
=== Australia ===
Australia's squad was announced on 15 December 2017:

Player	Date of Birth	Batting	Bowling style
Jason Sangha (c)	8 September 1999 (aged 18)	Right	Right-arm leg spin
**Will Sutherland (vc)**	27 October 1999 (aged 18)	Right	Right-arm fast-medium
**Xavier Bartlett**	17 December 1998 (aged 19)	Right	Right-arm fast-medium
Max Bryant	10 March 1999 (aged 18)	Right	Right-arm medium
Jack Edwards	19 April 2000 (aged 17)	Right	Right-arm medium-fast
Zak Evans	26 March 2000 (aged 17)	Right	Right-arm medium-fast
Jarrod Freeman	15 July 2000 (aged 17)	Right	Right-arm off spin
**Aaron Hardie**	7 January 1999 (aged 19)	Right	Right-arm medium-fast
Ryan Hadley	17 November 1998 (aged 19)	Right	Right-arm medium-fast
Baxter Holt (wk)	21 October 1999 (aged 18)	Right	–
**Nathan McSweeney**	8 March 1999 (aged 18)	Right	Right-arm off spin
Jonathan Merlo	15 December 1998 (aged 19)	Right	Right-arm medium-fast
Lloyd Pope	1 December 1999 (aged 18)	Right	Right-arm leg spin
Jason Ralston	3 April 1999 (aged 18)	Right	Right-arm medium-fast
Patrick Rowe	28 January 2001 (aged 16)	Right	–
Param Uppal	25 October 1998 (aged 19)	Right	Right-arm off spin
Austin Waugh	11 November 1999 (aged 18)	Right	Right-arm medium

During the tournament, Aaron Hardie replaced Jason Ralston in Australia's squad, who was injured. However, ahead of the final, Hardie suffered an injury and was replaced by Patrick Rowe.

=== India ===
India's squad was announced on 3 December 2017:

Player	Date of Birth	Batting	Bowling style
**Prithvi Shaw** (c)	9 November 1999 (aged 18)	Right	Right-arm off spin
**Shubman Gill** (vc)	8 September 1999 (aged 18)	Right	Right-arm off spin
Harvik Desai (wk)	4 October 1999 (aged 18)	Right	Right-arm fast medium
Aryan Juyal (wk)	11 November 2001 (aged 16)	Right	–
Manjot Kalra	15 January 1999 (aged 18)	Left	Right-arm medium
**Shivam Mavi**	26 November 1998 (aged 19)	Right	Right-arm fast-medium
Kamlesh Nagarkoti	28 December 1999 (aged 18)	Right	Right-arm fast
**Riyan Parag**	10 November 2001 (aged 16)	Right	Right-arm leg spin
Ishan Porel	5 September 1998 (aged 19)	Right	Right-arm medium
Himanshu Rana	1 October 1998 (aged 19)	Right	Right-arm medium
Anukul Roy	30 November 1998 (aged 19)	Left	Left-arm orthodox
**Abhishek Sharma**	4 September 2000 (aged 17)	Left	Left-arm orthodox
**Arshdeep Singh**	5 February 1999 (aged 18)	Left	Left-arm medium-fast
Sunil	16 October 1999 (aged 18)	Right	Left-arm orthodox
Aditya Thakare	8 November 1998 (aged 19)	Right	Right-arm medium
Pankaj Yadav	7 October 2002 (aged 15)	Right	Right-arm leg spin

After the tournament started, Aditya Thakare was added to the squad as cover for Ishan Porel, who suffered an injury.

=== Papua New Guinea ===
Papua New Guinea's squad was announced on 28 December 2017:

Player	Date of Birth	Batting	Bowling style
Vagi Karaho (c)	22 April 1999 (aged 18)	Right	Right-arm medium
James Tau (vc)	–	–	Left-arm medium
Daure Aiga	–	–	–
Boge Arua	–	–	Right-arm medium
Sinaka Arua	18 September 1998 (aged 19)	Right	Right-arm medium
Simon Atai (wk)	19 September 1999 (aged 19)	Left	–
Eisa Eka	–	–	–
Semo Kamea	21 August 2001 (aged 16)	–	Left-arm medium
Igo Mahuru	–	–	–
Leke Morea	–	–	–
Toa Nou	–	–	–
Nou Rarua	–	–	–
Ovia Sam	–	Right	–
Kevau Tau	–	Right	–
Heagi Toua	–	Right	–

=== Zimbabwe ===
Zimbabwe's squad was announced on 17 November 2017:

Player	Date of Birth	Batting	Bowling style
Liam Roche (c)	14 September 1999 (aged 18)	Right	Right-arm off spin
Kiran	23 June 1999 (aged 18)	Right	Right-arm fast
Jonathan Connolly	1 March 2000 (aged 17)	Right	Right-arm medium
Gregory Dollar (wk)	29 May 2000 (aged 17)	Right	–
Alistair Frost	24 April 1999 (aged 18)	Right	Right-arm medium
Taun Harrison	8 April 1999 (aged 18)	Left	Right-arm off spin
**Wesley Madhevere**	4 September 2000 (aged 17)	Right	Right-arm off spin
Tanunurwa Makoni	28 November 1999 (aged 18)	Right	Right-arm medium
Donald Mlambo	17 April 1999 (aged 18)	Right	–
Dion Myers	21 March 2002 (aged 15)	Right	Right-arm medium
Tinashe Nenhunzi	21 October 1999 (aged 18)	Right	Right-arm leg spin
Nkosilathi Nungu	12 February 2001 (aged 16)	Right	Right-arm medium
Kieran Robinson	8 July 1999 (aged 18)	Right	Right-arm medium-fast
Jayden Schadendorf	11 September 1998 (aged 19)	Right	Right-arm medium
**Milton Shumba**	19 October 2000 (aged 17)	Left	Left-arm orthodox

== Group C ==
=== Bangladesh ===
Bangladesh's squad was announced on 6 December 2017:

Player	Date of Birth	Batting	Bowling style
**Saif Hassan** (c)	30 October 1998 (aged 19)	Right	Unknown
Pinak Ghosh	20 January 1999 (aged 18)	Left	–
Robiul Haque	28 October 1999 (aged 18)	Right	Right-arm off spin
**Nayeem Hasan**	2 December 2000 (aged 17)	Right	Right-arm off spin
**Afif Hossain**	22 September 1999 (aged 18)	Left	Right-arm off spin
Shakil Hossain (wk)	22 April 2000 (aged 17)	Right	–
Roni Hossen	10 July 2000 (aged 17)	Right	Right-arm medium-fast
**Towhid Hridoy**	4 December 2000 (aged 17)	Right	Right-arm off spin
**Aminul Islam**	6 November 1999 (aged 18)	Right	Right-arm leg spin
Mahidul Islam (wk)	4 May 1999 (aged 18)	Right	–
**Hasan Mahmud**	12 October 1999 (aged 18)	Right	Right-arm medium
**Mohammad Naim**	22 August 1999 (aged 18)	Left	–
Qazi Onik	18 March 1999 (aged 18)	Left	Left-arm medium-fast
Mohammad Rakib	8 December 1998 (aged 19)	Right	Right-arm leg spin
Tipu Sultan	12 September 1998 (aged 19)	Left	Left-arm orthodox

=== Canada ===
Canada's squad was announced on 11 December 2017:

Player	Date of Birth	Batting	Bowling style
Arslan Khan (c)	16 April 1999 (aged 18)	Right	Right-arm leg spin
Akash Gill (vc)	18 October 1999 (aged 18)	Left	Right-arm medium
Ashton Deosammy	18 September 2000 (aged 17)	Right	Right-arm off spin
Arshdeep Dhaliwal	–	–	–
Faisal Jamkhandi	7 October 1999 (aged 18)	Right	Right-arm medium
Rishiv Joshi	4 November 2000 (aged 17)	Left	Left-arm medium-fast
Emanuel Khokhar	3 September 1998 (aged 19)	Right	Right-arm fast-medium
Kavian Naress	8 August 2000 (aged 17)	Right	Right-arm leg spin
Aran Pathmanathan	20 September 1999 (aged 18)	Right	Left-arm orthodox
Tiaan Pretorius	22 December 2000 (aged 17)	Right	Right-arm off spin
Krishen Samuel	14 March 1999 (aged 18)	Right	–
Randhir Sandhu	–	–	–
Pranav Sharma	18 April 1999 (aged 18)	Right	–
Rommel Shazad	9 December 1999 (aged 18)	Right	Right-arm off spin
Kevin Singh	–	–	–

=== England ===
England's squad was announced on 11 December 2017:

Player	Date of Birth	Batting	Bowling style
**Harry Brook** (c)	22 February 1999 (aged 18)	Right	Right-arm medium
Ethan Bamber	17 December 1998 (aged 19)	Right	Right-arm medium-fast
Liam Banks	3 June 1999 (aged 18)	Right	Right-arm off spin
**Tom Banton**	11 November 1998 (aged 19)	Right	–
Jack Davies (wk)	30 March 2000 (aged 17)	Right	–
Adam Finch	28 May 2000 (aged 17)	Right	Right-arm medium
Luke Hollman	16 September 2000 (aged 17)	Left	Right-arm leg spin
**Will Jacks** (vc)	21 November 1998 (aged 19)	Right	Right-arm off spin
~~Tom Lammonby~~	2 June 2000 (aged 17)	Left	Left-arm medium-fast
Dillon Pennington	26 February 1999 (aged 18)	Right	Right-arm fast-medium
Savin Perera	3 May 1999 (aged 18)	Left	Right-arm off spin
Prem Sisodiya	21 September 1998 (aged 19)	Right	Left-arm orthodox
Tom Scriven	18 November 1998 (aged 19)	Right	Right-arm medium-fast
Finlay Trenouth	22 September 1998 (aged 19)	Right	–
Roman Walker	6 August 2000 (aged 17)	Right	Right-arm fast-medium
Euan Woods	30 September 1998 (aged 19)	Left	Right-arm off spin

Prior to the tournament, Tom Lammonby was ruled out of England's squad and was replaced by Euan Woods.

=== Namibia ===
Namibia's squad was announced on 21 November 2017:

Player	Date of Birth	Batting	Bowling style
Lo-handre Louwrens (c)	24 April 1999 (aged 18)	Right	–
Henry Brink	29 March 2001 (aged 16)	Right	–
Petrus Burger	3 November 1999 (aged 18)	Right	Right-arm leg spin
Jan-Izak de Villiers	6 May 2001 (aged 16)	Right	Right-arm medium
Shaun Fouché	14 February 2000 (aged 17)	Right	Unknown
Jurgen Linde	11 February 1999 (aged 18)	Left	Left-arm medium
Nicol Loftie-Eaton	15 March 2000 (aged 17)	Left	Right-arm fast
Gerhard Lottering	19 May 2000 (aged 17)	Right	Right-arm fast
Erich van Mollendorf	4 June 2000 (aged 17)	Right	–
Dewald Nell	–	–	–
Mauritius Ngupita	13 December 2000 (aged 17)	Right	Right-arm off spin
Ben Shikongo	8 May 2000 (aged 17)	–	Right-arm fast-medium
Floris Steenkamp	–	–	–
Ramon Wilmot	17 September 2002 (aged 15)	Right	Right-arm leg spin
Eben van Wyk	19 March 1999 (aged 18)	Right	Right-arm medium

== Group D ==
=== Afghanistan ===
Afghanistan's squad was announced on 7 December 2017:

Player	Date of Birth	Batting	Bowling style
**Naveen-ul-Haq** (c)	23 September 1999 (aged 18)	Right	Right-arm medium-fast
**Qais Ahmad**	15 August 2000 (aged 17)	Right	Right-arm leg spin
**Ikram Alikhil** (wk)	29 September 2000 (aged 17)	Left	–
**Rahmanullah Gurbaz** (wk)	28 November 2001 (aged 16)	Right	–
**Ibrahim Zadran**	12 December 2001 (aged 16)	Right	Right-arm medium-fast
**Zahir Khan**	20 December 1998 (aged 19)	Left	Left-arm wrist spin
**Azmatullah Omarzai**	24 March 2000 (aged 17)	Right	Right-arm medium-fast
**Darwish Rasooli**	12 December 1999 (aged 18)	Right	Right-arm off spin
Bahir Shah	21 February 2000 (aged 17)	Right	Right-arm off spin
Tariq Stanikzai	13 December 1999 (aged 18)	Left	Left-arm orthodox
Nisar Wahdat	22 June 1999 (aged 18)	Right	Right-arm off spin
**Wafadar Momand**	1 February 2000 (aged 17)	Right	Right-arm medium
Waqarullah Ishaq	2 December 1999 (aged 18)	Right	Left-arm medium
**Mujeeb Ur Rahman**	28 March 2001 (aged 16)	Right	Right-arm off spin
Yousuf Zazai	25 December 1998 (aged 19)	Right	Right-arm medium-fast

=== Ireland ===
Ireland's squad was announced on 8 December 2017:

Player	Date of Birth	Batting	Bowling style
**Harry Tector** (c)	6 December 1999 (aged 18)	Right	Right-arm off spin
Ian Anders	–	Right	Right-arm medium
Aaron Cawley	15 October 1999 (aged 18)	Right	Right-arm fast-medium
Varun Chopra	1 February 2000 (aged 17)	Right	Right-arm leg spin
Mark Donegan (wk)	–	Left	–
Jonathan Garth	19 December 2000 (aged 17)	Right	Right-arm leg spin
Jamie Grassi	9 October 1998 (aged 19)	Right	–
Reece Kelly	–	Right	Right-arm medium
Graham Kennedy	24 August 1999 (aged 18)	Left	Left-arm medium
**Josh Little**	1 November 1999 (aged 18)	Right	Left-arm fast-medium
Sam Murphy	–	Left	–
Max Neville	29 April 2000 (aged 17)	Right	Right-arm fast-medium
**Neil Rock**	24 September 2000 (aged 17)	Left	–
Morgan Topping	–	Right	Right-arm off spin
Andrew Vincent	–	Right	–

=== Pakistan ===
Pakistan's squad was announced on 5 December 2017:

Player	Date of Birth	Batting	Bowling style
Hassan Khan (c)	16 October 1998 (aged 19)	Right	Left-arm orthodox
**Shaheen Afridi**	6 April 2000 (aged 17)	Left	Left-arm fast
Mohammad Ali Khan	6 September 1998 (aged 19)	Right	Unknown
Ammad Alam	3 October 1998 (aged 19)	Right	–
Muhammad Zaid	24 December 1999 (aged 18)	Right	Right-arm medium-fast
**Arshad Iqbal**	26 December 2000 (aged 17)	Right	Right-arm medium-fast
Muhammad Mohsin Khan	2 August 2000 (aged 17)	Left	–
**Muhammad Musa**	28 August 2000 (aged 17)	Right	Right-arm medium-fast
Saad Khan	16 November 1999 (aged 18)	Left	Left-arm orthodox
Rohail Nazir (wk)	10 October 2001 (aged 16)	Right	–
Munir Riaz	2 November 2001 (aged 16)	Right	Right-arm medium-fast
Suleman Shafqat	–	Right	Right-arm leg spin
Imran Shah	16 June 1999 (aged 18)	Left	–
Mohammad Taha	5 October 2000 (aged 17)	Left	Left-arm orthodox
Ali Zaryab	27 December 1998 (aged 19)	Left	Right-arm off spin

=== Sri Lanka ===
Sri Lanka's squad was announced on 11 December 2017:

Player	Date of Birth	Batting	Bowling style
**Kamindu Mendis** (c)	30 September 1998 (aged 19)	Left	Right-arm off spin/Left-arm orthodox
Jehan Daniel (vc)	13 April 1999 (aged 18)	Right	Right-arm medium-fast
Krishan Sanjula (wk)	30 September 1998 (aged 19)	Right	–
**Ashen Bandara**	23 November 1998 (aged 19)	Right	Right-arm leg spin
Hasitha Boyagoda	21 December 1998 (aged 19)	Right	Right-arm off spin
Haren Buddila	2 June 1999 (aged 18)	Right	Left-arm orthodox
Nipun Dananjaya	28 September 2000 (aged 17)	Left	Right-arm off spin
**Nuwanidu Fernando**	13 October 1999 (aged 18)	Right	Right-arm off spin
Santhush Gunathilake	14 September 1999 (aged 18)	Right	–
**Praveen Jayawickrama**	30 September 1998 (aged 19)	Right	Left-arm orthodox
Dhananjaya Lakshan	5 October 1998 (aged 19)	Left	Right
**Nishan Madushka** (wk)	10 September 1999 (aged 18)	Right	–
Nipun Malinga	27 February 2000 (aged 17)	Right	Right-arm fast-medium
Kalana Perera	28 July 2000 (aged 17)	Right	Left-arm orthodox
Thilan Prashan	20 November 1998 (aged 19)	Left	Right-arm medium-fast
Thisharu Rashmika	10 October 1998 (aged 19)	Left	Left-arm fast-medium

During the group stage fixtures, Kalana Perera was injured, ruled out of the tournament and replaced by Thilan Prasan.
