= List of Leinster Lightning first-class players =

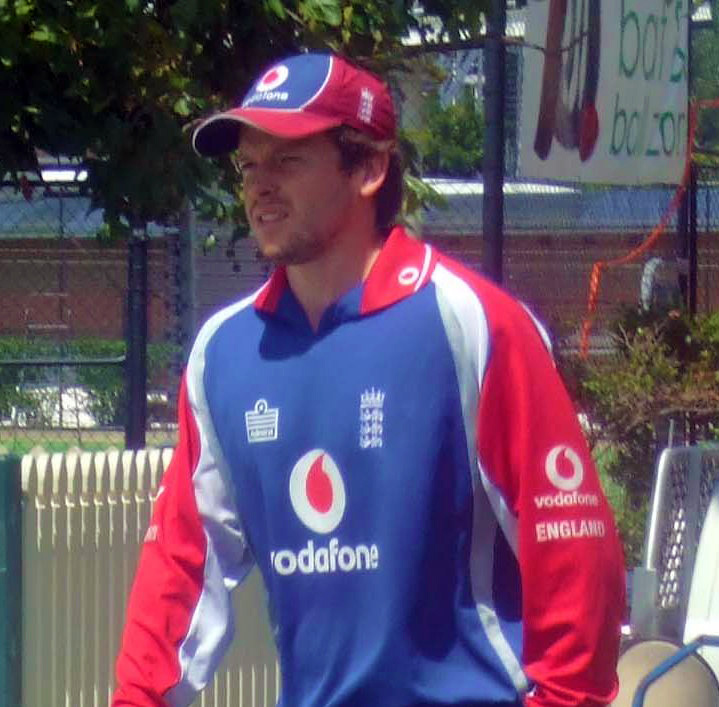
Ed Joyce (pictured) has the highest first-class score for Leinster Lightning with 167 not out.

Leinster Lightning was formed in 2013 and became a first-class team in 2017. They played their inaugural first-class match in the 2017 Inter-Provincial Championship against Northern Knights. Leinster Lightning have won the Interprovincial Championship five times, and once with first-class status. In total, 21 players have appeared in first-class cricket for Leinster Lightning, with five players having played in 11 out of 12 first-class fixtures played by Leinster Lightning.

Jack Tector is Leinster Lightning's leading run-scorer in first-class cricket, aggregating 527 runs. Four batsmen have scored a century for Leinster Lightning in the format: Ed Joyce, John Anderson, Andrew Balbirnie and Simi Singh. Joyce's score of 167 not out, scored in 2017 against Northern Knights is the highest score by a Leinster Lightning batsman, and Joyce also has the teams best batting average: 63.50. Among the bowlers, George Dockrell has taken more wickets than any other, claiming 36 – eight wickets more than that of the second most prolific bowler, Peter Chase. Dockrell also has the best bowling figures in an innings: he claimed six wickets against Northern Knights in a 2017 match, while conceding 29 runs. Lorcan Tucker has kept wicket in 11 out of 12 of Leinster Lightning's first-class matches, taking 24 catches and effecting 4 stumpings. Balbirnie has claimed the highest number of catches among fielders, taking 11.

Players are initially listed in order of appearance; where players made their debut in the same match, they are initially listed by batting order.

== Key ==
General

- † – Wicket-keeper
- First – Year of first-class debut for Leinster Lightning
- Last – Year of latest first-class match for Leinster Lightning
- Mat – Number of first-class appearances for Leinster Lightning

Batting

- Runs – Runs scored in career
- HS – Highest score
- Avg – Runs scored per dismissal
- * – Batsman remained not out

Bowling

- Balls – Balls bowled in career
- Wkt – Wickets taken in career
- BBI – Best bowling in an innings
- Ave – Average runs per wicket

Fielding

- Ca – Catches taken
- St – Stumpings effected
All statistics correct as of the end of the Irish 2019 cricket season.

== List of first-class cricketers ==
Leinster Lightning first-class players
No.	Name	Nationality	First	Last	Mat	Runs	HS	Avg	Balls	Wkt	BBI	Ave	Ca	St	Ref(s)
No.	Name	Nationality	First	Last	Mat	Batting			Bowling				Fielding		Ref(s)
1	Ed Joyce	Ireland	2017	2018	5	381	167*	63.50	0	–	–	–	6	0	
2	Jack Tector	Ireland	2017	2019	11	527	87	40.53	0	–	–	–	6	0	
3	John Anderson	Ireland	2017	2018	8	317	123*	35.33	90	1	1/8	55.00	10	0	
4	Andrew Balbirnie	Ireland	2017	2019	11	491	114*	49.10	411	11	4/23	12.45	11	0	
5	Simi Singh	Ireland	2017	2019	10	403	100*	36.63	1,551	25	5/38	22.88	5	0	
6	Lorcan Tucker †	Ireland	2017	2019	11	220	56	20.00	0	–	–	–	24	4	
7	Eddie Richardson	Ireland	2017	2018	5	166	81	33.20	516	10	4/88	26.50	4	0	
8	Gareth Delany	Ireland	2017	2019	3	35	15*	11.66	294	4	3/48	36.00	1	0	
9	Kevin O'Brien	Ireland	2017	2019	7	156	74	26.00	466	9	2/32	22.55	4	0	
10	Peter Chase	Ireland	2017	2019	11	57	24	14.25	1,359	28	5/24	31.03	1	0	
11	Max Neville	Ireland	2017	2017	2	2	1*	2.00	198	2	2/22	59.50	0	0	
12	George Dockrell	Ireland	2017	2019	11	304	92	27.63	1,899	36	6/29	22.94	5	0	
13	Sean Terry	Ireland	2017	2018	5	138	73	19.71	0	–	–	–	3	0	
14	Tyrone Kane	Ireland	2017	2019	9	214	75	30.57	1,098	15	3/45	33.53	2	0	
15	David Delany	Ireland	2017	2018	2	1	1*	1.00	284	5	4/31	35.60	0	0	
16	Stephen Doheny	Ireland	2018	2019	5	86	50	17.20	18	1	1/4	4.00	3	0	
17	Josh Little	Ireland	2018	2019	4	34	27	17.00	249	5	3/95	32.00	1	0	
18	Cormac McLoughlin-Gavin	Ireland	2019	2019	4	121	86	30.25	0	–	–	–	2	0	
19	Fionn Hand	Ireland	2019	2019	1	–	–	–	42	0	–	–	0	0	
20	Barry McCarthy	Ireland	2019	2019	3	52	44	26.00	366	8	5/51	21.12	1	0	
21	Patrick Tice †	Ireland	2019	2019	1	–	–	–	0	–	–	–	2	0	

== See also ==
- List of Leinster Lightning List A players
- List of Leinster Lightning Twenty20 players
- List of Irish first-class cricketers
