= 2019 Inter-Provincial Trophy =

Cricket tournament

- Dates: 22 June 2019 – 18 August 2019
- Administrator: Cricket Ireland
- Cricket format: Twenty20
- Tournament format: Round-robin
- Champions: Northern Knights (1st title)
- Participants: 4
- Matches: 12
- Most runs: Greg Thompson (102)
- Most wickets: Shane Getkate (11)

The 2019 Inter-Provincial Trophy was the seventh edition of the Inter-Provincial Trophy, a Twenty20 cricket competition played in Ireland. It was held from 22 June to 18 August 2019. It was the third edition of the competition to be played with full Twenty20 status. The competition was split into two halves, each branded as a T20 Festival. The first half was played in June, and the second half was played in August. Leinster Lightning were the defending champions.

Following the conclusion of the June festival, Northern Knights had won all three of their matches, however, two matches were abandoned due to rain. All of the matches in the August festival were abandoned due to rain, with no play taking place across all three days. As a result, the Northern Knights won the tournament.

== Points table ==
The following teams competed:

| Team | Pld | W | L | T | NR | Pts | NRR |
|---|---|---|---|---|---|---|---|
| Northern Knights | 6 | 3 | 0 | 0 | 3 | 19 | +2.459 |
| Leinster Lightning | 6 | 1 | 1 | 0 | 4 | 12 | –0.182 |
| North West Warriors | 6 | 0 | 1 | 0 | 5 | 10 | –4.035 |
| Munster Reds | 6 | 0 | 2 | 0 | 4 | 8 | –0.850 |

== Fixtures ==
=== June festival ===
The following fixtures for the June festival were confirmed by Cricket Ireland:

22 June 2019
Scorecard

| North West Warriors; 78 (19.2 overs) | v | Northern Knights; 82/3 (10.2 overs) |
| Adam McDaid 17* (26); Shane Getkate 5/8 (3.2 overs) | | James McCollum 42* (31); Boyd Rankin 2/18 (3 overs) |

Northern Knights won by 7 wickets
Pembroke Cricket Club, Dublin
Umpires: Steve Wood and Alan Neill

- North West Warriors won the toss and elected to bat.
- Adam McDaid and Kyle Magee (North West Warriors) both made their T20 debuts.
- Points: Northern Knights 5, North West Warriors 0.

22 June 2019
Scorecard

| Munster Reds; 181/7 (20 overs) | v | Leinster Lightning; 183/7 (20 overs) |
| Cormac Hassett 49 (43); Peter Chase 2/32 (3 overs) | | Kevin O'Brien 56 (32); Jeremy Benton 3/23 (4 overs) |

Leinster Lightning won by 3 wickets
Pembroke Cricket Club, Dublin
Umpires: Steve Wood and Alan Neill

- Munster Reds won the toss and elected to bat.
- Jonathan Garth (Munster Reds) made his T20 debut.
- Points: Leinster Lightning 4, Munster Reds 0.

23 June 2019
Scorecard

| Northern Knights; 167/6 (20 overs) | v | Munster Reds; 135 (19.4 overs) |
| Shane Getkate 49 (38); Max Sorensen 3/47 (4 overs) | | Stephen Doheny 35 (30); Mark Adair 4/22 (4 overs) |

Northern Knights won by 32 runs
Pembroke Cricket Club, Dublin
Umpires: Azam Baig and Alan Neill

- Northern Knights won the toss and elected to bat.
- Points: Northern Knights 4, Munster Reds 0.

23 June 2019
Scorecard

| Leinster Lightning | v | North West Warriors |

Match abandoned
Pembroke Cricket Club, Dublin
Umpires: Azam Baig and Alan Neill

- No toss.
- No play was possible due to rain.
- Points: Leinster Lightning 2, North West Warriors 2.

24 June 2019
Scorecard

| Munster Reds | v | North West Warriors |

Match abandoned
Pembroke Cricket Club, Dublin
Umpires: Alan Neill and Mary Waldron

- No toss.
- No play was possible due to rain.
- Points: Munster Reds 2, North West Warriors 2.

24 June 2019
Scorecard

| Northern Knights; 138/5 (13 overs) | v | Leinster Lightning; 130/9 (13 overs) |
| Greg Thompson 65* (31); Tyrone Kane 2/21 (2 overs) | | Andy Balbirnie 44 (20); James Cameron-Dow 3/12 (2 overs) |

Northern Knights won by 8 runs
Pembroke Cricket Club, Dublin
Umpires: Alan Neill and Mary Waldron

- Northern Knights won the toss and elected to bat.
- The match was reduced to 13 overs per side due to a wet outfield.
- Points: Northern Knights 4, Leinster Lightning 0.

=== August festival ===
The following fixtures for the August festival were confirmed by Cricket Ireland:

16 August 2019
Scorecard

| Northern Knights | v | Leinster Lightning |

Match abandoned
Bready Cricket Club Ground, Bready
Umpires: Jareth McCready and Mark Hawthorne

- No toss.
- No play was possible due to a wet outfield.
- Points: Leinster Lightning 2, Northern Knights 2.

16 August 2019
Scorecard

| North West Warriors | v | Munster Reds |

Match abandoned
Bready Cricket Club Ground, Bready
Umpires: Jareth McCready and Mark Hawthorne

- No toss.
- No play was possible due to rain.
- Points: Munster Reds 2, North West Warriors 2.

17 August 2019
Scorecard

| Munster Reds | v | Northern Knights |

Match abandoned
Bready Cricket Club Ground, Bready
Umpires: Michael Foster and Mark Hawthorne

- No toss.
- No play was possible due to rain.
- Points: Munster Reds 2, Northern Knights 2.

17 August 2019
Scorecard

| North West Warriors | v | Leinster Lightning |

Match abandoned
Bready Cricket Club Ground, Bready
Umpires: Michael Foster and Mark Hawthorne

- No toss.
- No play was possible due to rain.
- Points: Leinster Lightning 2, North West Warriors 2.

18 August 2019
Scorecard

| Leinster Lightning | v | Munster Reds |

Match abandoned
Bready Cricket Club Ground, Bready
Umpires: Gary Blair and Mark Hawthorne

- No toss.
- No play was possible due to rain.
- Points: Leinster Lightning 2, Munster Reds 2.

18 August 2019
Scorecard

| North West Warriors | v | Northern Knights |

Match abandoned
Bready Cricket Club Ground, Bready
Umpires: Mark Hawthorne and Deighton Butler

- No toss.
- No play was possible due to rain.
- Points: Northern Knights 2, North West Warriors 2.
