= 2018 Inter-Provincial Cup =

Cricket tournament

- Dates: 28 May 2018 – 9 September 2018
- Administrator: Cricket Ireland
- Cricket format: List A
- Tournament format: Round-robin
- Champions: Leinster Lightning
- Participants: 3
- Matches: 6
- Most runs: George Dockrell (231)
- Most wickets: George Dockrell (10)

The 2018 Inter-Provincial Cup was the sixth edition of the Inter-Provincial Cup, a List A cricket competition played in Ireland. It was held from 28 May to 9 September 2018. It is the second edition of the competition to be played with List A status. Leinster Lightning were the defending champions.

In the second match of the tournament, between Leinster Lightning and Northern Knights, Simi Singh and George Dockrell of Leinster Lightning set a new record partnership in List A cricket for the seventh wicket, with 215 runs.

Leinster Lightning retained their title, after beating North West Warriors by 58 runs in the final match of the tournament.

== Points table ==
The following teams competed:

Team	Pld	W	L	T	NR	Pts
Leinster Lightning	4	3	0	0	1	15
North West Warriors	4	1	2	0	1	6
Northern Knights	4	1	3	0	0	5

== Fixtures ==
As with the first-class competition, the Inter-Provincial Championship, the competition format is a home and away round robin.

=== 1st match ===
28 May 2018
Scorecard

Northern Knights (H); 226 (47.1 overs)	v	North West Warriors; 227/2 (46.3 overs)
Harry Tector 84 (111); David Scanlon 4/60 (8.1 overs)		William Porterfield 110* (145); Gary Kidd 1/38 (7 overs)

North West Warriors won by 8 wickets
Stormont, Belfast
Umpires: Graeme McCrea and Philip Thompson

- Northern Knights won the toss and elected to bat.
- Alistair Shields, Harry Tector, Neil Rock, James Cameron-Dow (Northern Knights) and Graham Kennedy (North West Warriors) all made their List A debuts.
- Points: North West Warriors 4, Northern Knights 0.

=== 2nd match ===
4 June 2018
Scorecard

Leinster Lightning (H); 277/6 (50 overs)	v	Northern Knights; 224 (42.3 overs)
Simi Singh 121* (108); Shane Getkate 4/47 (10 overs)		Neil Rock 47 (42); George Dockrell 5/21 (10 overs)

Leinster Lightning won by 53 runs
The Vineyard, Dublin
Umpires: Sum Wijesundera and H Bingham

- Northern Knights won the toss and elected to field.
- Marc Ellison (Northern Knights) made his List A debut.
- Points: Leinster Lightning 4, Northern Knights 0.

=== 3rd match ===
19 June 2018
Scorecard

North West Warriors (H); 137/6 (40 overs)	v	Leinster Lightning
Niall O'Brien 57* (79); George Dockrell 3/30 (8 overs)

No result
Woodvale Road, Eglinton
Umpires: Steve Wood and Graeme McCrea

- Leinster Lightning won the toss and elected to field.
- Josh Little and Stephen Doheny (Leinster Lightning) both made their List A debuts.
- Points: North West Warriors 2, Leinster Lightning 2.

=== 4th match ===
1 July 2018
Scorecard

Northern Knights (H); 235/9 (50 overs)	v	Leinster Lightning; 239/7 (48.3 overs)
Harry Tector 68* (78); Simi Singh 3/49 (10 overs)		George Dockrell 94* (100); Andre Malan 3/51 (10 overs)

Leinster won by 3 wickets
Stormont, Belfast
Umpires: Michael Foster and Sum Wijesundera

- Northern Knights won the toss and elected to bat.
- Points: Leinster Lightning 4, Northern Knights 0.

=== 5th match ===
16 July 2018
Scorecard

North West Warriors (H); 139 (38 overs)	v	Northern Knights; 141/8 (38.5 overs)
Niall O'Brien 54* (91); Mark Adair 3/16 (8 overs)		Christopher Dougherty 46 (79); Andy McBrine 3/37 (10 overs)

Northern Knights won by 2 wickets
Woodvale Road, Eglinton
Umpires: Michael Foster and George Brolly

- North West Warriors won the toss and elected to bat.
- Ryan MacBeth (North West Warriors) and Stephen Bunting (Northern Knights) both made their List A debuts.
- Points: Northern Knights 5, North West Warriors 0.

=== 6th match ===
9 September 2018
Scorecard

Leinster Lightning (H); 253/8 (50 overs)	v	North West Warriors; 195 (42.1 overs)
Gareth Delany 67 (109); Andrew Britton 5/23 (10 overs)		William Porterfield 71 (87); Kevin O'Brien 3/34 (5.1 overs)

Leinster Lightning won by 58 runs
Observatory Lane, Dublin
Umpires: Scott Richardson and Roland Black

- Leinster Lightning won the toss and elected to bat.
- Points: Leinster Lightning 5, North West Warriors 0.
