= Alistair Shields =

Irish cricketer (born 1994)

Personal information
- Full name: Alistair Ivan Shields
- Born: 24 January 1994 (age 32); Newtownards, Northern Ireland
- Batting: Right-handed
- Bowling: Right-arm medium

Domestic team information
- Years: Team
- 2018–present: Northern Knights
- Only List A: 28 May 2018 Northern v North West
- Twenty20 debut: 18 May 2018 Northern v North West

Career statistics
Competition	LA	T20
Matches	1	4
Runs scored	8	87
Batting average	8.00	21.75
100s/50s	0/0	0/0
Top score	8	40
Catches/stumpings	0/–	1/–
- Source: Cricinfo, 28 August 2018

Alistair Ivan Shields (born 24 January 1994) is an Irish cricketer. He made his Twenty20 debut for Northern Knights in the 2018 Inter-Provincial Trophy on 18 May 2018. Prior to his Twenty20 debut, he was named in Ireland's squad for the 2012 Under-19 Cricket World Cup. He made his List A debut for Northern Knights in the 2018 Inter-Provincial Cup on 28 May 2018.
