= Jamie Magowan =

Irish cricketer

Personal information
- Full name: Jamie Magowan
- Role: Wicket-keeper

Domestic team information
- Years: Team
- 2016–present: Northern Knights
- First-class debut: 1 August 2017 Northern v North West
- Twenty20 debut: 23 June 2017 Northern v Leinster

Career statistics
Competition	FC	T20
Matches	2	3
Runs scored	31	1
Batting average	31.00	–
100s/50s	0/0	0/0
Top score	30	1*
Catches/stumpings	3/0	2/1
- Source: Cricinfo, 7 September 2017

Jamie Magowan is an Irish cricketer. He made his Twenty20 cricket debut for Northern Knights in the 2017 Inter-Provincial Trophy on 23 June 2017. He made his first-class debut for Northern Knights in the 2017 Inter-Provincial Championship on 1 August 2017.
