= Gregory McFaul =

Irish cricketer (born 2000)

Personal information
- Full name: Gregory McFaul
- Born: 3 November 2000 (age 26); Derry, Northern Ireland
- Batting: Unknown
- Bowling: Right-arm medium-fast

Domestic team information
- Years: Team
- 2019: North West Warriors

Career statistics
Competition	List A
Matches	1
Runs scored	0
Batting average	–
100s/50s	–/–
Top score	0*
Balls bowled	24
Wickets	2
Bowling average	18.50
5 wickets in innings	–
10 wickets in match	–
Best bowling	2/39
Catches/stumpings	–/–
- Source: Cricinfo, 27 May 2019

Gregory McFaul (born 3 November 2000) is an Irish cricketer. He made his List A one-day debut for North West Warriors against Northern Knights in the 2019 Inter-Provincial Cup at Belfast.
