= Stephen Bunting (cricketer) =

Irish cricketer (born 1984)

Personal information
- Born: 27 December 1984 (age 41)
- Source: Cricinfo, 16 July 2018

Stephen Bunting (born 27 December 1984) is an Irish cricketer. He made his List A debut for Northern Knights in the 2018 Inter-Provincial Cup on 16 July 2018.
