= Oliver Metcalfe =

Northern Irish cricketer

Personal information
- Full name: Oliver Guy Metcalfe
- Born: 12 July 2001 (age 25); Belfast, Northern Ireland
- Batting: Right-handed

Domestic team information
- Years: Team
- 2024–: Munster Reds

Career statistics
Competition	List A
Matches	5
Runs scored	114
Batting average	28.50
100s/50s	0/1
Top score	53
Catches/stumpings	8/0
- Source: Cricinfo, 29 August 2024

Oliver Guy Metcalfe (born 12 July 2001) is a cricketer from Northern Ireland who represents Munster Reds and Ireland A.

Metcalfe played youth cricket for Instonians, and was selected for Ireland at under-19 level. He studied Business Management at Durham University, where he competed for Durham UCCE.

Metcalfe made his List A debut for Munster Reds against Leinster on 15 May 2024.
