= 2017 Inter-Provincial Championship =

Cricket tournament

- Dates: 30 May 2017 – 7 September 2017
- Administrator: Cricket Ireland
- Cricket format: First-class
- Tournament format: Round-robin
- Champions: Leinster Lightning (5th title)
- Participants: 3
- Matches: 6
- Most runs: James Shannon (446)
- Most wickets: George Dockrell (22)

The 2017 Inter-Provincial Championship was the fifth edition of the Inter-Provincial Championship, a first-class cricket competition played in Ireland. It was held from 30 May to 7 September 2017. It was the first edition of the competition to be played with first-class status, following the outcome of a meeting by the International Cricket Council (ICC) in October 2016. Leinster Lightning won the tournament, their fifth-consecutive, and completed a domestic clean-sweep in the process.

== Points table ==
Team	Pld	W	L	D	Pts
Leinster Lightning	4	2	0	2	68
North West Warriors	4	0	1	3	33
Northern Knights	4	0	1	3	31

Champions

== Fixtures ==
=== 1st match ===
30 May–1 June 2017
Scorecard

Northern Knights	v	North West Warriors (H)
130 (37.5 overs); James Shannon 71 (106); Craig Young 5/37 (13 overs)		167 (64.5 overs); Andy McBrine 30 (66); Nathan Smith 4/34 (18 overs)
161 (55 overs); Robert McKinley 43* (73); David Scanlon 5/29 (12 overs)		48/2 (15 overs); Imran Butt 23 (36); Gary Kidd 1/1 (2 overs)

Match drawn
Woodvale Road, Eglinton
Umpires: Roland Black and Jareth McCready

- North West Warriors won the toss and elected to field.
- No play was possible on day 3 due to rain.
- Ross Allen, Rickie-Lee Dougherty, Aaron Gillespie, Niall McDonnell, David Rankin, David Scanlon (North West Warriors); Adam Dennison, Christopher Dougherty, Shane Getkate, Nathan Smith, Lee Nelson and Nikolai Smith (Northern Knights) all made their first-class debuts.
- Points: North West Warriors 11, Northern Knights 10.

=== 2nd match ===
5–7 June 2017
Scorecard

Northern Knights (H)	v	Leinster Lightning
233 (85.4 overs); James McCollum 119* (235); Eddie Richardson 4/33 (18 overs)		288 (95 overs); Jack Tector 75 (196); Gary Kidd 3/70 (25 overs)
328/6d (96 overs); James Shannon 140* (161); Andrew Balbirnie 3/40 (24 overs)

Match drawn
Civil Service Cricket Club Ground, Stormont
Umpires: Michael Foster and Paul Reynolds

- Leinster Lightning won the toss and elected to field.
- Gareth Delany, Max Neville, Eddie Richardson, Simi Singh, Jack Tector, Lorcan Tucker (Leinster Lightning) and John Matchett (Northern Knights) all made their first-class debuts.
- Points: Leinster Lightning 10, Northern Knights 9.

=== 3rd match ===
20–22 June 2017
Scorecard

North West Warriors	v	Leinster Lightning (H)
235 (87.2 overs); Andy McBrine 67 (125); Simi Singh 3/59 (22.2 overs)		365/9d (101.3 overs); Ed Joyce 156 (209); Craig Young 3/70 (24.3 overs)
296 (108.4 overs); Niall O'Brien 87 (192); George Dockrell 6/67 (40.4 overs)		123/3 (16 overs); Jack Tector 48* (40); Stuart Thompson 2/17 (3 overs)

Match drawn
Oak Hill Cricket Club Ground, Wicklow
Umpires: Graeme McCrea and Paul Reynolds

- North West Warriors won the toss and elected to bat.
- Andrew Austin, Steve Vijay Lazars and Johnny Thompson (North West Warriors) all made their first-class debuts.
- Points: Leinster Lightning 11, North West Warriors 8.

=== 4th match ===
1–3 August 2017
Scorecard

North West Warriors	v	Northern Knights (H)
208/9d (68.2 overs); Ross Allen 81 (179); Gary Kidd 3/36 (9 overs)		0/0d (0 overs)
84/1d (28 overs); David Barr 42* (89); Gary Kidd 1/19 (7 overs)		264/8 (79 overs); James Shannon 59 (84); Steve Vijay Lazars 3/54 (13 overs)

Match drawn
The Green, Comber
Umpires: Mark Hawthorne and Philip Thompson

- North West Warriors won the toss and elected to bat.
- No play was possible on day 2 due to rain.
- David Barr (North West Warriors); Jamie Magowan and Jacob Mulder (Northern Knights) all made their first-class debuts.
- Points: Northern Knights 10, North West Warriors 8.

=== 5th match ===
30 August–1 September 2017
Scorecard

North West Warriors (H)	v	Leinster Lightning
122 (54.2 overs); Ross Allen 37 (102); George Dockrell 4/38 (22 overs)		274 (81 overs); Kevin O'Brien 74 (87); Johnny Thompson 3/61 (14 overs)
148 (50.1 overs); Aaron Gillespie 51 (99); Andrew Balbirnie 4/23 (10.1 overs)

Leinster Lightning won by an innings and 4 runs
Bready Cricket Club Ground, Bready
Umpires: Roland Black and Paul Reynolds

- Leinster Lightning won the toss and elected to field.
- Reece Kelly, Ryan MacBeth (North West Warriors) and Tyrone Kane (Leinster Lightning) all made their first-class debuts.
- Points: Leinster Lightning 23, North West Warriors 4.

=== 6th match ===
5–7 September 2017
Scorecard

Northern Knights	v	Leinster Lightning (H)
195 (55.2 overs); James Shannon 86 (109); David Delany 4/31 (12.2 overs)		383/8d (88.3 overs); Ed Joyce 167* (246); Shane Getkate 4/62 (15 overs)
176 (63.2 overs); James Shannon 60 (155); George Dockrell 6/29 (21.2 overs)

Leinster won by an innings and 12 runs
Clontarf Cricket Club, Clontarf
Umpires: Bala Kailash and Alan Neill

- Leinster Lightning won the toss and elected to field.
- David Delany (Leinster Lightning) made his first-class debut.
- Points: Leinster Lightning 24, Northern Knights 4.
