= English cricket team in Ireland in 2025 =

International cricket tour

	Ireland	England
- Dates: 17 – 21 September 2025
Captains	Paul Stirling	Jacob Bethell

Twenty20 International series
- Results: England won the 3-match series 2–0
Most runs	Harry Tector (89)	Phil Salt (118)
Most wickets	Graham Hume (2); Matthew Humphreys (2)	Adil Rashid (4)
- Player of the series: Phil Salt (Eng)

The England cricket team toured Ireland in September 2025 to play the Ireland cricket team. The tour consisted of three Twenty20 International (T20I) matches. In August 2024, the Cricket Ireland (CI) confirmed the fixtures for the tour, as a part of the 2025 home international season. All the matches were played at The Village in Dublin. England last toured Ireland in 2019.

== Squads ==
Ireland	England
Paul Stirling (c); Ross Adair; Ben Calitz (wk); Curtis Campher; Gareth Delany; George Dockrell; Graham Hume; Matthew Humphreys; Barry McCarthy; Jordan Neill; Harry Tector; Lorcan Tucker (wk); Ben White; Craig Young	Jacob Bethell (c); Rehan Ahmed; Sonny Baker; Tom Banton (wk); Jos Buttler (wk); Jordan Cox (wk); Sam Curran; Scott Currie; Liam Dawson; Tom Hartley; Will Jacks; ~~Saqib Mahmood~~; Jamie Overton; ~~Matthew Potts~~; Adil Rashid; Phil Salt (wk); Luke Wood

On 3 September, Jordan Cox was added into the squad. On 5 September, Matthew Potts was released from the T20I series, and Sam Curran was added to the squad. On 14 September, Saqib Mahmood was rule out of the series due to a knee injury, and was replaced by Scott Currie who had previously played for Scotland. After the second T20I was abandoned due to rain, Currie was released from the squad so that he could play for Hampshire in the One Day Cup final at Trent Bridge.

== T20I series ==
=== 1st T20I ===
17 September 2025
13:30
Scorecard

Ireland; 196/3 (20 overs)	v	England; 197/6 (17.4 overs)
Harry Tector 61* (36); Adil Rashid 1/36 (4 overs)		Phil Salt 89 (46); Graham Hume 2/36 (2 overs)

England won by 4 wickets
Malahide Cricket Ground, Dublin
Umpires: Mark Hawthorne (Ire) and Jonathan Kennedy (Ire)
Player of the match: Phil Salt (Eng)

- England won the toss and elected to field.
- Jacob Bethell captained England for the first time in T20Is.
- Gareth Delany (Ire) played his 100th international match.
- Lorcan Tucker (Ire) scored his 3,000th run in international cricket.
- Harry Tector and Lorcan Tucker's 123 run partnership became Ireland's highest for the 3rd wicket in T20Is, breaking the record of 82 between Tector and Gareth Delany against Oman in 2022.

=== 2nd T20I ===
19 September 2025
13:30
Scorecard

Ireland	v	England

Match abandoned
Malahide Cricket Ground, Dublin
Umpires: Jonathan Kennedy (Ire) and Aidan Seaver (Ire)

- No toss.
- No play was possible due to rain.

=== 3rd T20I ===
21 September 2025
13:30
Scorecard

Ireland; 154/8 (20 overs)	v	England; 155/4 (17.1 overs)
Gareth Delany 48* (29); Adil Rashid 3/29 (4 overs)		Jordan Cox 55 (35); Craig Young 1/21 (2.1 overs)

England won by 6 wickets
Malahide Cricket Ground, Dublin
Umpires: Mark Hawthorne (Ire) and Aidan Seaver (Ire)
Player of the match: Adil Rashid (Eng)

- England won the toss and elected to field.
- Ben Calitz (Ire) and Sonny Baker (Eng) both made their T20I debuts.
