= Reece Kelly =

Irish cricketer

Personal information
- Full name: Reece Kelly
- Batting: Right-handed
- Bowling: Right-arm medium
- Role: All-rounder

Domestic team information
- Years: Team
- 2017–present: North West Warriors
- Only First-class: 30 August 2017; North West v Leinster

Career statistics
Competition	First-class
Matches	1
Runs scored	27
Batting average	27.00
100s/50s	0/0
Top score	22*
Balls bowled	25
Wickets	0
Bowling average	–
5 wickets in innings	–
10 wickets in match	–
Best bowling	–
Catches/stumpings	0/–
- Source: Cricinfo, 7 February 2018

Reece Kelly is an Irish cricketer. He made his first-class debut for the North West Warriors in the 2017 Inter-Provincial Championship on 30 August 2017. In December 2017, he was named in Ireland's squad for the 2018 Under-19 Cricket World Cup.
