= Andrew Austin (cricketer) =

Irish cricketer (born 1997)

Personal information
- Full name: Andrew Austin
- Born: 3 September 1997 (age 29); Ireland
- Batting: Left-handed
- Role: Batsman, wicket-keeper

Domestic team information
- Years: Team
- 2016–present: North West Warriors
- First-class debut: 20 June 2017 North West v Leinster

Career statistics
Competition	First-class
Matches	2
Runs scored	0
Batting average	0.00
100s/50s	0/0
Top score	0
Catches/stumpings	1/0
- Source: ESPNcricinfo, 9 August 2017

Andrew Austin (born 3 September 1997) is an Irish cricketer. He made his first-class debut for North West Warriors in the 2017 Inter-Provincial Championship on 20 June 2017. Prior to his first-class debut, he was part of Ireland's squad for the 2016 Under-19 Cricket World Cup. He made his List A debut for North West Warriors in the 2019 Inter-Provincial Cup on 24 April 2019.
