= David O'Sullivan (cricketer, born 1997) =

English cricketer

Personal information
- Born: 11 June 1997 (age 29); Sydney, New South Wales, Australia
- Batting: Right-handed
- Bowling: Right-arm fast-medium

Domestic team information
- Years: Team
- 2017: Cardiff MCCU
- 2024–2025: North West Warriors

Career statistics
Competition	FC	LA	T20
Matches	1	6	10
Runs scored	2	16	55
Batting average	2.00	8.00	13.75
100s/50s	0/0	0/0	0/0
Top score	2	15	26*
Balls bowled	156	217	156
Wickets	4	8	8
Bowling average	23.00	25.12	32.75
5 wickets in innings	0	0	0
10 wickets in match	0	0	0
Best bowling	3/29	2/27	2/32
Catches/stumpings	0/–	2/–	5/–
- Source: Cricinfo, 1 February 2026

David O'Sullivan (born 11 June 1997) is an Australian former first-class cricketer.

Sullivan was born at Sydney in June 1997 and was educated in England at Merchant Taylors' School, Northwood. From there he went up to Cardiff Metropolitan University, where he made a single appearance in first-class cricket for Cardiff MCCU against Hampshire at Southampton in 2017. Batting once in the match, O'Sullivan was dismissed for 2 runs in the Cardiff MCCU first innings by Fidel Edwards, while with his right-arm fast-medium bowling he took 3 wickets in Hampshire's first innings and one wicket in their second, taking match figures of 4 for 92.
