= Adam McDaid =

Irish cricketer

Personal information
- Full name: Adam McDaid
- Source: Cricinfo, 27 May 2019

Adam McDaid is an Irish cricketer. He made his List A debut for North West Warriors in the 2019 Inter-Provincial Cup on 27 May 2019. He made his Twenty20 debut for North West Warriors in the 2019 Inter-Provincial Trophy on 22 June 2019.
