= Marcus Poskitt =

Irish cricketer (born 2000)

Personal information
- Full name: Marcus Poskitt
- Born: 28 November 2000 (age 25)
- Source: Cricinfo, 6 July 2018

Marcus Poskitt (born 28 November 2000) is an Irish cricketer. He made his Twenty20 debut for North West Warriors in the 2018 Inter-Provincial Trophy on 6 July 2018. He made his List A debut for North West Warriors in the 2019 Inter-Provincial Cup on 23 May 2019.
