= Bready =

Village in County Tyrone, Northern Ireland

Coordinates: 54°54′55″N 7°25′11″W

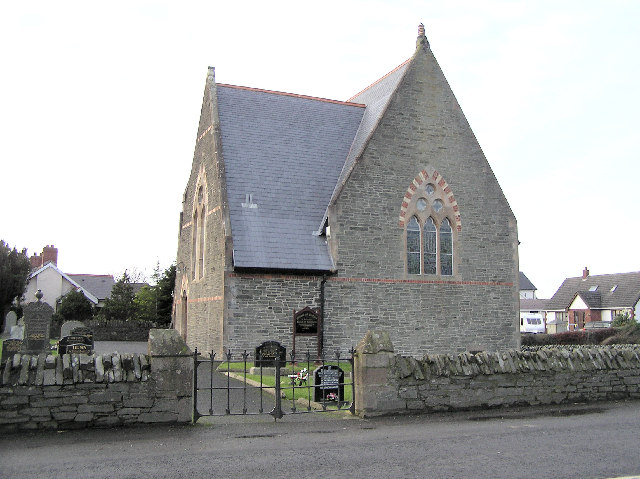
St John's (Church of Ireland) Church, Dunnalong, Bready

Bready (from Irish An Bhréadaigh) is a small village in County Tyrone, Northern Ireland. In the 2001 Census, it had a population of 93 people. It lies within the Strabane District Council area. It is roughly 10 kilometres (6 mi) south-west of Derry.

== Churches ==
- St John's (Church of Ireland) Church, Dunnalong, built in 1865 and with a steeply pitched roof, is a Grade B1 listed building situated on the main Derry to Strabane road in Bready.
- Bready Reformed Presbyterian Church

== Sport ==
Bready Cricket Club is located at Bready Cricket Club Ground, 3.5km north-east of Bready in the village of Magheramason, and is the home of the North West of Ireland Cricket Union, formerly the County Derry Cricket Union, and the North West Warriors. The ground is one of four venues to have hosted international matches for the Ireland cricket team.

Bready Cricket Club first entered junior league and cup competitions in the North-West of Ireland in 1938. To mark the opening of a new pavilion in 1987, a Viv Richards XI played an Ian Botham XI at Bready. In 1996, the club won the North West Senior Cup.

In May 2015, the International Cricket Council cleared the ground to host international white-ball cricket. The ground hosted its first internationals when Ireland played Scotland in four Twenty20 International matches in June 2015, with Scotland winning the series 2-0, and hosted its first One-Day International in July 2019, in which Ireland beat Zimbabwe. It hosted its first women's international in September 2016, with Ireland beating Bangladesh.
