= Ben Calitz =

Canadian-Irish cricketer (born 2002)

Benjamin Calitz
Personal information
- Full name: Benjamin Fredeman Calitz
- Born: 6 July 2002 (age 24); Vancouver, British Columbia, Canada
- Batting: Left-handed
- Bowling: Right-arm slow
- Role: Wicket-keeper-batter

International information
- National side: Ireland
- ODI debut (cap 75): 7 August 2026 v Afghanistan
- Last ODI: 12 August 2026 v Afghanistan
- T20I debut (cap 62): 21 September 2025 v England
- Last T20I: 28 June 2026 v India

Domestic team information
- Years: Team
- 2024: Munster Reds
- 2024–2025: Northern Knights
- 2026–present: North West Warriors
- 2026: Dublin Guardians

Career statistics
Competition	ODI	T20I	FC	LA
Matches	3	11	2	19
Runs scored	47	174	67	592
Batting average	15.66	19.33	22.33	37.00
100s/50s	0/0	0/0	0/0	1/3
Top score	27	37	39*	104*
Catches/stumpings	0/–	8/–	6/0	11/1
- Source: ESPNcricinfo, 25 September 2026

Benjamin Fredeman Calitz (born 6 July 2002) is a Canadian-born Irish cricketer. Calitz played youth cricket in Canada, representing the country in the 2020 Under-19 Cricket World Cup, but moved to Ireland in 2022 and became eligible to play for the Irish team in 2025. He made his Twenty20 International debut for Ireland in September 2025 and was named in Ireland's squad for the 2026 Men's T20 World Cup.

== Early life and career ==
Calitz was born in Vancouver where his South African father, also named Ben, worked as a rugby coach. While growing up, he also spent time living in both South Africa and Namibia. Calitz played for Canada's under-19 cricket team, and was in their squad for the 2020 Under-19 Cricket World Cup.

Calitz had his first international contract in Ireland as an eighteen-year-old, and after a conversation with Irish international cricketer Mark Adair decided to move to Ireland and seek to play for the Irish team after the three-year qualification period. Beginning in 2022 he played club cricket and then at inter-provincial level played first for the Munster Reds and later for the Northern Knights.

Calitz made his Twenty20 debut for the Knights in the 2024 Inter-Provincial Trophy on 8 May 2024, and then made his List A debut in the 2024 Inter-Provincial Cup the next day.

== Playing for Ireland ==
Calitz became eligible to play cricket for the Irish cricket team on 1 April 2025, and he was selected to play for the Ireland Wolves, Ireland's second-tier team, in their tour of the United Arab Emirates that same month. He made his first-class debut on this tour against Afghanistan A on 7 April 2025. The morning after playing another match against the Afghanistan team, Calitz was suffering from side pain and went to a hospital in Abu Dhabi, where he had an appendectomy. The recovery from the surgery meant he missed the beginning of the 2025 Irish domestic season.

In September 2025, just five months after becoming eligible to play for Ireland, Calitz earned his maiden call-up for their first-ever T20I series against England. He made his Twenty20 International debut in the third match of the series on 21 September, scoring 22 runs.

Having played only two Twenty20 Internationals for Ireland, Calitz was included in their squad for the 2026 Men's T20 World Cup.
