= Monil Patel =

Indian cricketer (born 1990)

Personal information
- Born: 5 May 1990 (age 36); Enfield, London
- Source: ESPNcricinfo, 25 October 2015

Monil Patel (born 5 May 1990) is an Indian cricketer who plays for Baroda. He made his first-class debut on 22 October 2015 in the 2015–16 Ranji Trophy.
