= Kyle Magee =

Irish cricketer (born 2001)

Personal information
- Full name: Kyle Winston Magee
- Born: 22 November 2001 (age 24); Derry, Northern Ireland
- Source: Cricinfo, 28 May 2019

Kyle Magee (born 22 November 2001) is an Irish cricketer. He made his first-class debut for North West Warriors in the 2019 Inter-Provincial Championship on 28 May 2019. He made his Twenty20 debut for North West Warriors in the 2019 Inter-Provincial Trophy on 22 June 2019. In February 2021, Magee was part of the intake for the Cricket Ireland Academy. He made his List A debut on 15 June 2021, for North West Warriors in the 2021 Inter-Provincial Cup.
