= Steve Vijay Lazars =

Indian cricketer (born 1983)

Personal information
- Full name: Steve Vijay Lazars
- Born: 14 February 1983 (age 43); Mysore, India
- Batting: Left-handed
- Bowling: Left-arm medium
- Role: All-rounder

Domestic team information
- Years: Team
- 2017–present: North West Warriors
- FC debut: 20 June 2017 North West v Leinster
- LA debut: 1 May 2017 North West v Leinster

Career statistics
Competition	FC	LA	T20
Matches	2	4	4
Runs scored	96	2	28
Batting average	32.00	0.66	28.00
100s/50s	0/1	0/0	0/0
Top score	62	2	15
Balls bowled	120	150	66
Wickets	3	5	4
Bowling average	25.33	24.00	15.50
5 wickets in innings	0	0	0
10 wickets in match	0	0	0
Best bowling	3/54	2/44	2/27
Catches/stumpings	1/–	2/–	0/–
- Source: ESPNcricinfo, 9 August 2017

Steve Vijay Lazars (born 14 February 1983) is an Indian-born cricketer. He made his List A debut for North West Warriors in the 2017 Inter-Provincial Cup on 1 May 2017. He made his Twenty20 cricket debut for North West Warriors in the 2017 Inter-Provincial Trophy on 26 May 2017. He made his first-class debut for North West Warriors in the 2017 Inter-Provincial Championship on 20 June 2017.
