= Andrew Britton (cricketer) =

Irish cricketer

Personal information
- Full name: Samuel Andrew Britton
- Born: 10 February 1988 (age 38); Donemana, Co Tyrone, Northern Ireland
- Batting: Right-handed
- Bowling: Right-arm fast

International information
- National side: Ireland
- Only ODI (cap 30): 12 July 2009 v Kenya

Domestic team information
- Years: Team
- 2013–2019: North West Warriors

Career statistics
Competition	ODI	FC	LA	T20
Matches	1	1	6	7
Runs scored	–	0	62	2
Batting average	–	0.00	15.50	1.00
100s/50s	–	0/0	0/0	0/0
Top score	–	0	36*	2*
Balls bowled	36	81	234	145
Wickets	0	0	7	6
Bowling average	–	–	24.85	22.00
5 wickets in innings	–	–	1	0
10 wickets in match	–	–	0	0
Best bowling	–	–	5/23	2/24
Catches/stumpings	0/–	2/–	2/–	0/–
- Source: CricketArchive, 24 April 2023

Samuel Andrew Britton (born 10 February 1988) is a Northern Irish cricketer. He is a right-arm fast bowler and has played a single One Day International for Ireland.

== Career ==
=== Youth internationals ===
Andrew Britton has represented Ireland's under-15 and under-19 teams. As of August 2009, Britton had played six Youth One Day Internationals, all part of the 2008 U-19 World Cup which took place in February–March 2008. He took 9 wickets in the tournament at an average of 18.66; Britton was Ireland U-19's leading wicket-taker for the tournament, although 20th overall. His best bowling figures of 4 wickets for 14 runs (4/14) came against Zimbabwe U-19s in the 13th place play-off, which was Ireland's final match of the tournament.

=== Senior recognition ===
At club level, Britton plays for Brigade in Ireland's North West Cricket Union.

In June 2009, Britton was called into the full Ireland squad for the first time. Ireland coach Phil Simmons commented that "Andy Britton deserves his chance as he's done well over the past 18 months". The squad was for Ireland's opening match of the 2009–10 ICC Intercontinental Cup against Kenya, in which Ireland were seeking their fourth consecutive title, and three subsequent One Day Internationals. Although Britton did not make his first-class debut on the occasion, he did make his One Day International debut against Kenya on 12 July 2009, aged 21. Opening the bowling with Boyd Rankin, Britton did not take a wicket and conceded 37 runs from 6 overs.

He made his Twenty20 cricket debut for North West Warriors in the 2017 Inter-Provincial Trophy on 26 May 2017.
