= David Barr (Irish cricketer) =

Irish cricketer (born 1993)

Personal information
- Born: 8 November 1993 (age 33)

Domestic team information
- Years: Team
- 2014–present: North West Warriors
- First-class debut: 1 August 2017 North West v Northern
- List A debut: 2 July 2017 North West v Leinster

Career statistics
Competition	FC	LA	T20
Matches	6	4	1
Runs scored	138	71	41
Batting average	15.33	17.75	41.00
100s/50s	0/0	0/0	0/0
Top score	42*	28	41
Catches/stumpings	2/–	1/–	1/–
- Source: Cricinfo, 28 August 2018

David Barr (born 8 November 1993) is an Irish cricketer. He made his List A debut for North West Warriors in the 2017 Inter-Provincial Cup on 2 July 2017. He made his first-class debut for North West Warriors in the 2017 Inter-Provincial Championship on 1 August 2017. He made his Twenty20 debut for North West Warriors in the 2017 Inter-Provincial Trophy on 11 August 2017.
