= Max Neville =

Irish cricketer (born 2000)

Personal information
- Full name: Maximilian Neville
- Born: 29 April 2000 (age 26); Dublin, Ireland
- Batting: Right-handed
- Bowling: Right-arm fast
- Role: Bowler

Domestic team information
- Years: Team
- 2017–present: Munster Reds
- 2017–present: Leinster Lightning
- First-class debut: 5 June 2017 Leinster v Northern
- Twenty20 debut: 26 May 2017 Munster v Northern

Career statistics
Competition	FC	T20
Matches	2	4
Runs scored	2	3
Batting average	2.00	1.50
100s/50s	0/0	0/0
Top score	1*	2
Balls bowled	198	84
Wickets	2	4
Bowling average	59.50	30.25
5 wickets in innings	0	0
10 wickets in match	0	n/a
Best bowling	2/22	2/22
Catches/stumpings	0/–	0/–
- Source: ESPNcricinfo, 22 July 2017

Maximilian Neville (born 29 April 2000) is an Irish cricketer. He made his Twenty20 cricket debut for Munster Reds in the 2017 Inter-Provincial Trophy on 26 May 2017. He made his first-class debut for Leinster Lightning in the 2017 Inter-Provincial Championship on 5 June 2017.

In December 2017, he was named in Ireland's squad for the 2018 Under-19 Cricket World Cup.
