= Bobby Gamble =

English-born Irish cricketer (born 1995)

Personal information
- Full name: Robert Neil Gamble
- Born: 25 January 1995 (age 31); Nottingham, Nottinghamshire, England
- Batting: Right-handed
- Bowling: Right-arm medium-fast
- Role: Bowler

Domestic team information
- Years: Team
- 2015–2017: Loughborough MCCU
- 2017: Leinster Lightning
- FC debut: 2 April 2015 Loughborough MCCU v Hampshire
- Only LA: 4 June 2017 Leinster v Northern

Career statistics
Competition	FC	LA	T20
Matches	6	1	4
Runs scored	51	0	6
Batting average	8.50	–	6.00
100s/50s	0/0	0/0	0/0
Top score	32	0*	5
Balls bowled	1,038	–	66
Wickets	9	–	4
Bowling average	76.00	–	23.75
5 wickets in innings	0	–	0
10 wickets in match	0	–	0
Best bowling	2/16	–	2/20
Catches/stumpings	2/–	0/–	1/–
- Source: CricketArchive, 23 June 2017

Robert Neil Gamble (born 25 January 1995) is an English-born first-class cricketer who represented Loughborough MCC University, Leinster Lightning, Ireland 'A', Somerset County Cricket Club and Fremantle District Cricket Club (Western Australia). He plays club cricket for YMCA Cricket Club in Dublin, having previously played for Plumtree Cricket Club in Nottinghamshire. He made his First Class debut for Loughborough MCCU v Hampshire at the Rose Bowl on 2 April 2015, and his Twenty20 debut for Leinster Lightning in the 2017 Inter-Provincial Trophy on 26 May 2017. He made his List A debut for Leinster Lightning in the 2017 Inter-Provincial Cup on 4 June 2017.
