= Jack Tector =

Irish cricketer

Personal information
- Full name: Jack Bill Tector
- Born: 2 September 1996 (age 30); Dublin, Ireland
- Batting: Right-handed
- Bowling: Right-arm off break
- Role: Batsman
- Relatives: Harry Tector (brother); Tim Tector (brother); Alice Tector (sister)

Domestic team information
- Years: Team
- 2015–2023: Leinster Lightning
- 2017–2020: Munster Reds
- First-class debut: 5 June 2017 Leinster v Northern
- List A debut: 4 June 2017 Leinster v Northern

Career statistics
| Competition | FC | LA | T20 |
|---|---|---|---|
| Matches | 12 | 28 | 13 |
| Runs scored | 554 | 584 | 271 |
| Batting average | 36.93 | 21.62 | 20.84 |
| 100s/50s | 0/5 | 1/4 | 0/2 |
| Top score | 87 | 110 | 59 |
| Catches/stumpings | 6/– | 6/– | 0/– |
- Source: ESPNcricinfo, 7 December 2025

Jack Bill Tector (born 2 September 1996) is an Irish cricketer. He made his Twenty20 cricket debut for Munster Reds in the 2017 Inter-Provincial Trophy on 26 May 2017. Prior to his Twenty20 debut, he was the captain of Ireland's squad for the 2016 Under-19 Cricket World Cup.

He made his List A debut for Leinster Lightning in the 2017 Inter-Provincial Cup on 4 June 2017. He made his first-class debut for Leinster Lightning in the 2017 Inter-Provincial Championship on 5 June 2017. In April 2019, he was one of five cricketers to be awarded with an Emerging Player Contract by Cricket Ireland, ahead of the 2019 domestic season. In May 2019, during the 2019 Inter-Provincial Cup, Tector scored his first century in List A cricket.

In June 2019, he was named in the Ireland Wolves squad for their home series against the Scotland A cricket team.
