= Aaron Gillespie (cricketer) =

Irish cricketer (born 1997)

Personal information
- Full name: Aaron Paul Gillespie
- Born: 13 March 1997 (age 29)
- Batting: Right-handed
- Bowling: Right-arm medium

Domestic team information
- Years: Team
- 2015–present: North West Warriors
- FC debut: 30 May 2017 North West v Northern
- LA debut: 29 May 2017 North West v Northern

Career statistics
Competition	FC	LA	T20
Matches	9	8	10
Runs scored	250	89	165
Batting average	19.23	14.83	20.62
100s/50s	0/2	0/1	0/1
Top score	57	54	80*
Balls bowled	60	12	–
Wickets	2	2	–
Bowling average	13.50	7.00	–
5 wickets in innings	0	0	–
10 wickets in match	0	0	–
Best bowling	2/12	2/14	–
Catches/stumpings	6/–	2/–	1/–
- Source: Cricinfo, 27 July 2019

Aaron Gillespie (born 13 March 1997) is an Irish cricketer. He made his List A debut for North West Warriors in the 2017 Inter-Provincial Cup on 29 May 2017. Prior to his List A debut, he was part of Ireland's squad for the 2016 Under-19 Cricket World Cup. He made his first-class debut for North West Warriors in the 2017 Inter-Provincial Championship on 30 May 2017. He made his Twenty20 debut for North West Warriors in the 2017 Inter-Provincial Trophy on 16 June 2017.
