= David Rankin (cricketer) =

Irish cricketer (born 1987)

Personal information
- Full name: David Andrew Rankin
- Born: 2 August 1987 (age 39); Derry, Northern Ireland
- Batting: Right-handed
- Bowling: Right-arm off break
- Role: Batsman
- Relatives: WB Rankin (brother)

International information
- National side: Ireland (2015–2016)
- T20I debut (cap 33): 18 June 2015 v Scotland
- Last T20I: 5 September 2016 v Hong Kong

Domestic team information
- Years: Team
- 2013–present: North West Warriors

Career statistics
| Competition | T20I | FC | LA | T20 |
|---|---|---|---|---|
| Matches | 2 | 11 | 12 | 17 |
| Runs scored | 49 | 315 | 207 | 314 |
| Batting average | 24.50 | 21.00 | 18.81 | 18.47 |
| 100s/50s | 0/0 | 0/2 | 0/2 | 0/2 |
| Top score | 34 | 86 | 84 | 67 |
| Catches/stumpings | 0/– | 12/– | 5/– | 5/1 |
- Source: CricInfo, 22 May 2021

David Andrew Rankin (born 2 August 1987) is an Irish cricketer from Northern Ireland. He made his Twenty20 International (T20I) debut for Ireland against Scotland on 18 June 2015. He is the brother of Boyd Rankin.

He made his List A debut for North West Warriors in the 2017 Inter-Provincial Cup on 1 May 2017. He made his first-class debut for North West Warriors in the 2017 Inter-Provincial Championship on 30 May 2017. He was the leading run-scorer for North West Warriors in the 2018 Inter-Provincial Trophy tournament, with 159 runs in six matches.
