= David Scanlon =

Irish cricketer (born 1984)

Personal information
- Full name: David Scanlon
- Born: 7 April 1984 (age 42); Derry, Northern Ireland
- Batting: Right-handed
- Bowling: Right-arm medium
- Role: Bowler

Domestic team information
- Years: Team
- 2017–present: North West Warriors
- FC debut: 30 May 2017 North West v Northern
- LA debut: 29 May 2017 North West v Northern

Career statistics
Competition	FC	LA	T20
Matches	10	8	6
Runs scored	119	15	–
Batting average	19.66	3.75	–
100s/50s	0/1	0/0	–
Top score	62*	11	–
Balls bowled	1,040	277	90
Wickets	31	8	7
Bowling average	21.77	32.87	19.00
5 wickets in innings	1	0	0
10 wickets in match	0	0	0
Best bowling	5/29	4/60	3/19
Catches/stumpings	2/–	1/–	2/–
- Source: Cricinfo, 28 May 2026

David Scanlon (born 7 August 1984) is an Irish cricketer.

A right-arm medium-pace bowler, Scanlon made his List A debut for North West Warriors in the 2017 Inter-Provincial Cup on 29 May 2017. He made his first-class and Twenty20 debut also for North West Warriors in the 2017 Inter-Provincial Championship on 30 May 2017, and in the 2017 Inter-Provincial Trophy on 23 June 2017, respectively.

He was the leading wicket-taker in the 2018 Inter-Provincial Championship, with 19 dismissals in four matches. He took his best first-class bowling figures of 5 for 29 in his debut match in 2017.
