= Graham Kennedy (cricketer) =

Irish cricketer

Personal information
- Born: 24 August 1999 (age 27); Derry, Northern Ireland
- Batting: Left-handed
- Bowling: Slow left-arm orthodox

Domestic team information
- Years: Team
- 2016–present: North West Warriors
- First-class debut: 20 June 2018 North West v Leinster
- List A debut: 28 May 2018 North West v Northern

Career statistics
Competition	FC	LA	T20
Matches	6	24	26
Runs scored	154	377	199
Batting average	25.66	20.94	16.58
100s/50s	0/2	0/2	0/0
Top score	73*	64	38*
Balls bowled	352	855	324
Wickets	9	17	21
Bowling average	18.00	41.35	18.19
5 wickets in innings	0	0	0
10 wickets in match	0	0	0
Best bowling	3/36	3/48	3/15
Catches/stumpings	2/–	10/–	9/–
- Source: Cricinfo, 5 June 2022

Graham Kennedy (born 24 August 1999) is an Irish cricketer. He made his Twenty20 cricket debut for North West Warriors in the 2017 Inter-Provincial Trophy on 23 June 2017. He made his List A debut for North West Warriors in the 2018 Inter-Provincial Cup on 28 May 2018.

In December 2017, he was named in Ireland's squad for the 2018 Under-19 Cricket World Cup.

He made his first-class debut for North West Warriors in the 2018 Inter-Provincial Championship on 20 June 2018. In June 2019, he was named in the Ireland Wolves squad for their home series against the Scotland A cricket team.

In August 2021, Kennedy was named in Ireland's One Day International (ODI) squad for their series against Zimbabwe. The following month, Kennedy was named in Ireland's provisional squad for the 2021 ICC Men's T20 World Cup.
