= Boyd Rankin =

Irish cricketer

Personal information
- Full name: William Boyd Rankin
- Born: 5 July 1984 (age 42); Derry, County Londonderry, Northern Ireland
- Height: 2.04 m (6 ft 8 in)
- Batting: Left-handed
- Bowling: Right-arm fast-medium
- Role: Bowler
- Relatives: David Rankin (brother)

International information
- National sides: Ireland (2007–2012, 2015–2020); England (2013–2014)
- Test debut (cap 8/661): 3 January 2014; England v Australia
- Last Test: 24 July 2019; Ireland v England
- ODI debut (cap 16/230): 31 January 2007; Ireland v Bermuda
- Last ODI: 9 January 2020; Ireland v West Indies
- T20I debut (cap 14/64): 8 June 2009; Ireland v Bangladesh
- Last T20I: 8 March 2020; Ireland v Afghanistan

Domestic team information
- Years: Team
- 2006–2007, 2019: Derbyshire
- 2008–2018: Warwickshire
- 2018–2021: North West Warriors

Career statistics
Competition	Test	ODI	T20I	FC
Matches	3	75	50	108
Runs scored	43	100	64	704
Batting average	8.60	7.69	9.14	9.14
100s/50s	0/0	0/0	0/0	0/1
Top score	17	18*	16*	56*
Balls bowled	443	3,702	1,058	15,592
Wickets	8	106	55	352
Bowling average	38.00	27.87	22.16	26.46
5 wickets in innings	0	0	0	9
10 wickets in match	0	0	0	0
Best bowling	2/5	4/15	3/16	6/55
Catches/stumpings	0/–	17/–	16/–	29/–
- Source: ESPNCricInfo, 23 April 2020
- Rankin's voice recorded April 2015

William Boyd Rankin (born 5 July 1984) is a Northern Irish former cricketer who played international cricket for Ireland, and briefly also played for England. He is a right-arm medium-fast bowler. He is the brother of fellow cricketer David Rankin.

Born in Derry, Rankin is a tall bowler who stands at 6 ft 8 inches and has a distinctive bouncing action in his bowling. Rankin revealed in an interview that his action is modelled on bowlers like Curtly Ambrose and Glenn McGrath who "hit the deck from just back of a length outside off stump". He studied agriculture at Harper Adams University College in Shropshire, during which time he worked on his batting technique.

In August 2012, Rankin announced that he would cease playing for Ireland, with the hope of one day playing for the English team. He debuted for England against New Zealand in a T20 match on 25 June 2013, and later played one Test for England during the 2013-14 Ashes series in Australia.

With few prospects of a return to the England team, Rankin confirmed in December 2015 that he would commit to playing for Ireland in the upcoming 2016 ICC World Twenty20. He has subsequently represented Ireland in both 20 and 50-over formats. He was one of the eleven cricketers to play in Ireland's first ever Test match, against Pakistan, in May 2018.

In December 2018, he was one of nineteen players to be awarded a central contract by Cricket Ireland for the 2019 season. In January 2020, he was again awarded a central contract from Cricket Ireland, the first year in which all contracts were awarded on a full-time basis.

On 21 May 2021, Rankin announced his retirement from international and inter-provincial cricket.

== Domestic career ==
=== Middlesex ===
His performances in for Ireland's U-19s and the Ireland A team to attracted the attention of county scouts and prompted several offers of trials. In an interview, Rankin stated that he chose to join Middlesex "because of the Irish connection, with Ed Joyce and (Eoin) Morgan there, I wanted to be some place where I knew a few faces". During his two-season stint at Middlesex, from 2004 to 2005, Rankin played several times for the second XI but failed to break into the first team.

=== Derbyshire ===
In an effort to experience more first team cricket, he signed a deal with Derbyshire for the 2006 season, encouraged by Mike Hendrick, Derbyshire's bowling coach. Although Rankin played a first team match and a Pro40 match in which he took a wicket with his first over, his season was prematurely cut short by a side strain.

Derbyshire renewed his contract for the 2007 English season, though his opportunities were limited due mainly to injury. He played just three first-class matches taking 10 wickets at an average of 29.20 with best figures of 4/41 which was against his old county, Middlesex; in that match he finished with his best first-class match figures of 8/121. He also played five one day matches taking 4 wickets at an average of 50.50 with best figures of 2/56.

=== Warwickshire ===
At the end of the 2007 season, Rankin turned down a new contract with Derbyshire in favour of a two-year contract with Warwickshire. Rankin explained his choice as a difficult one, but the opportunity of working with Allan Donald was too good to miss. He was contracted to play in the controversial Indian Cricket League for the Kolkata Tigers; fellow Irishman, Niall O'Brien also participated in the tournament.

Rankin jeopardised his season when in April 2008 he injured himself during fielding practice before a County Championship match against Worcestershire. He dived to stop a ball and landed awkwardly on his shoulder, suffering a SLAP tear to his right shoulder. He underwent an operation and was expected to be on the sidelines for about six months. After just four months, Rankin was back playing cricket. In August 2008, he made his debut for Warwickshire in a first-class match against Essex. He finished with figures of 4/80 in a drawn match as Warwickshire only bowled once. He finished the season with 12 first-class wickets for Warwickshire in five matches at an average of 30.16, and did not play any one-day matches for Warwickshire. Speaking in October 2008 about his first season with Warwickshire and being coached by Allan Donald, Rankin said "He [Donald] doesn't seek to make many technical changes during the season – that's more for the winter. It's more about the mental side of the game, how to work a batsman over, how to think more about the game, how to work batsmen out and take more wickets".

At the end of the 2008 season, Warwickshire secured promotion from the Second Division of the County Championship to the First. In 2009 Rankin impressed Ashley Giles, Warwickshire's director of cricket, with his bowling. Giles commented that "[Rankin]'s got great attributes – he's tall, he can bowl fast, the ball bounces from nowhere ... We've just got to keep him fit". Having generally come on as first or second change bowler for Warwickshire in 2008, at the start of the 2009 season Rankin was entrusted with the new ball and opened the bowling with Chris Woakes.

=== T20 career ===
In July 2019, he was selected to play for the Belfast Titans in the inaugural edition of the Euro T20 Slam cricket tournament. However, the following month the tournament was cancelled. In August 2019, he joined Derbyshire Falcons for the 2019 t20 Blast.

== International career ==
=== Ireland (2007–2012) ===
Rankin has represented Ireland at every age group from U-13 upwards, and by the age of 15 he was playing first team cricket for Bready, his local club. He played three youth One Day Internationals (ODI) for Ireland, finishing with two wickets at an average of 52.00. Performances for the Ireland A team prompted Rankin's inclusion in the World Cup Squad, although in the World Cricket League he made little impact in Ireland's unsuccessful campaign as he played only one match and was unavailable with a stomach bug for much of the time. Rankin took 4/56 against the UAE to help Ireland make the Intercontinental Cup Final of 2007, which Ireland later won although Rankin did not play because of county commitments.

Rankin had a successful World Cup in the Caribbean, and finished as Ireland's leading wicket taker of the tournament, with 12 wickets in his 9 matches at an average of 27 at a strike rate of 29.67. In Ireland's second game of the 2007 ICC World Cup, Rankin took 3/32 to bowl Pakistan out for 132 and win the match, causing a major upset. Ireland's victory against Pakistan ensured they progressed to the next round. A stress fracture of the fibula forced Rankin to miss ODIs against India and South Africa in 2007 which Ireland lost.

In August 2008, Rankin made his first appearance for Ireland since the 2007 World Cup. He played in the first two ODIs in the three match series against Kenya before returning to Warwickshire. In the first match Rankin took 2/26 as Ireland won by 33 runs, however he did not bowl in the second match which was rained off after Ireland had batted for eight overs. In October 2008, Rankin playing in the Intercontinental Cup against Namibia; finished with match figures of 7/72, with 5/39 in the second innings as Ireland secured an eight run win. In the match he recorded his maiden first-class five-wicket haul. In the tournament final against Namibia, Ireland won by nine wickets and Rankin finished with match figures of 6/107.

Rankin was part of the Ireland squad that took part in the tri-series against Kenya and Zimbabwe in October 2008. Ireland did not qualify for the final of the tournament because they had a lower run-rate than Kenya; Rankin played in both of Ireland's ODI and took two wickets at an average of 41.50. In April 2009, Rankin was part of the Ireland squad which won the 2009 ICC World Cup Qualifier. Rankin finished the tournament as Ireland's leading wicket-taker, with 15 wickets from 9 matches at an average of 20.40, and was the equal sixth highest wicket-taker for the 2009 tournament.

Although Rankin didn't play in the 2009 ICC World Twenty20 Qualifier in August 2008 in which Ireland shared the title with the Netherlands, he was selected for the 2009 ICC World Twenty20. He made his Twenty20 International debut on 8 June 2009. In Ireland's six-wicket victory over Bangladesh in Ireland's opening match of the tournament, he took 1/36 from his four overs with Naeem Islam as his maiden wicket. The match was also Rankin's first competitive Twenty20 match. Rankin was one of seven Ireland players to be nominated for the 2009 Associate and Affiliate Player of the Year (there were fourteen nominees in all), although he did not make the 4-man short-list.

In January 2010, Rankin sustained a stress fracture to his right foot which forced him to miss Ireland's tour of Sri Lanka. He recovered from injury in time to be selected in Ireland's 15-man squad for the 2011 World Cup. On 16 August, Rankin represented the England Lions against Sri Lanka A. A side made up of some of the best players from Associate and Affiliate teams was put together to face England in Dubai in January 2012. The three-day match was part of England's preparation for a series against Pakistan later that month. Rankin was one of four Ireland players included in the 12-man squad.

=== England (2013–2014) ===
In August 2012, Rankin announced that he would cease playing for Ireland, with the hope of one day playing for the English team. He debuted for England against New Zealand in a T20 match on 25 June 2013. His first appearance for England in a 50-over game was against his former team of Ireland at Malahide on 3 June 2013. After performing impressively in several short-format games, Rankin was selected for England's test squad touring Australia in 2013–2014. He made his test debut on 3 January 2014 against Australia in the fifth Test of the 2013–14 Ashes series. His first wicket was in the second innings, when Peter Siddle nicked a ball to Jonny Bairstow. Subsequent opportunities, however, proved elusive and Rankin confirmed at the end of 2015 that he would once again make himself available for the Irish national team.

=== Ireland (2015–2020) ===
In February 2016 Rankin returned to the Ireland T20 team for a two-match series against the United Arab Emirates. The following month he played in all three matches of Ireland's unsuccessful attempt to qualify for the World T20 tournament in Bangladesh. In June 2016 Rankin was welcomed back to Ireland's ODI team for two matches against Sri Lanka.

In May 2018, he was named in a fourteen-man squad and also was included in playing XI for Ireland's first ever Test match, which was played against Pakistan and thus become the 15th cricketer in history to play test cricket for two countries. He made his Test debut for Ireland, against Pakistan, on 11 May 2018. Rankin took Ireland's first wicket in Tests, dismissing Pakistan's Azhar Ali, who was caught by William Porterfield at second slip.

In January 2019, he was named in Ireland's squad for their one-off Test against Afghanistan in India. In May 2019, in Ireland's last match of their ODI tri-series, Rankin took his 200th wicket in international cricket. A few days later, in the opening match against Afghanistan, Rankin took his 100th wicket in ODIs.

In July 2019, Rankin was named in Ireland's Test squad for their one-off match against England at Lord's. He got two wickets bagging the wickets of Sam Curran caught by James McCollum and Stuart Broad caught by Gary Wilson as England slumped to 85 all out on the first day of the test match. As a result of playing for Ireland in the match, he became the first cricketer since Nawab of Pataudi in 1946 to play for and against England in a Test match.

In September 2019, he was named in Ireland's squad for the 2019 ICC T20 World Cup Qualifier tournament in the United Arab Emirates. In January 2020, in the first ODI match against the West Indies, Rankin played in his 150th international match for Ireland. On 10 July 2020, Rankin was named in Ireland's 21-man squad to travel to England to start training behind closed doors for the ODI series against the England cricket team.

=== Retirement ===
On 21 May 2021, Rankin announced his retirement from all forms of cricket.

== See also ==
- List of cricketers who have played for more than one international team
