= North West Warriors =

Provincial cricket team on the island of Ireland

Personnel
- Captain: Andy McBrine
- Coach: Boyd Rankin
- Owner: North West of Ireland Cricket Union

Team information
- Founded: 2013
- Home ground: Bready Cricket Club Ground
- Capacity: 3,000

History
- Inter-Provincial Championship wins: 1
- Interprovincial One-Day Trophy wins: 0
- Interprovincial Twenty20 Cup wins: 1

North West Warriors is one of four provincial cricket teams in Ireland. Along with the Leinster Lightning, Northern Knights and Munster Reds, it makes up the Inter-Provincial Championship, Inter-Provincial Cup & Inter-Provincial Trophy.

The team is located in the west of Ulster province containing areas of the Republic of Ireland and Northern Ireland. The team managed by North West of Ireland Cricket Union.

== History ==
In 2013, Cricket Ireland formed the three-day Inter-Provincial Championship, featuring teams from Leinster, the NCU and the North West. The North West team is known as the North West Warriors. On 8 April, they announced Bobby Rao as their coach.

Up to and including the 2016 Inter-Provincial Championship, the matches were not given first-class status. However, at an International Cricket Council meeting in October 2016, first-class status was awarded to all future matches.

== Honours ==
Inter-Provincial Championship (first-class) - 1 title

2018 Inter-Provincial Championship: Champions

Inter-Provincial Cup - (50 over)

Best result

2017 Inter-Provincial Cup: Runners-up

Inter-Provincial Trophy (T20) - 1 title

2014 Inter-Provincial Trophy: Champions

== Players ==
=== Current squad ===
- ‡ denotes players with international caps.
- * denotes players qualified to play for Ireland on residency or dual nationality.

Name	Nationality	Birth date	Batting style	Bowling style	Club	Notes
Batters
Andrew Balbirnie ‡	Ireland	28 December 1990 (age 35)	Right-handed	Right-arm off break	Pembroke	Ireland central contract
Jake Egan *	Australia	20 June 2003 (age 23)	Right-handed	Right-arm off break	C.I.Y.M.S.	
Gavin Roulston	Ireland	16 June 2006 (age 20)	Left-handed	Right-arm off break	Brigade	
All-rounders
Gareth Delany ‡	Ireland	28 April 1997 (age 29)	Right-handed	Right-arm leg break	Leinster	Ireland central contract
Alastair Doherty	Ireland	—	—	—	Fox Lodge	
Samuel Haslett	Ireland	23 October 2007 (age 18)	Right-handed	Right-arm leg break	Bonds Glen	
Scott MacBeth	Ireland	1 October 2004 (age 21)	Right-handed	Right-arm off break	Brigade	
Jared Wilson	Ireland	25 December 1999 (age 26)	Right-handed	Right arm medium	Newbuildings	
Wicket-keepers
Ben Calitz ‡	Ireland	6 July 2002 (age 23)	Left-handed	Right-arm slow	Lisburn	Ireland central contract
Billy Dougherty	Ireland	—	—	—	Donemana	
Freddie Ogilby	Ireland	10 August 2007 (age 18)	Right-handed	—	Bready	
Bowlers
Ryan MacBeth	Ireland	15 November 1997 (age 28)	Right-handed	Right-arm medium-fast	Brigade	
Andy McBrine ‡	Ireland	30 April 1993 (age 33)	Left-handed	Right-arm off break	Donemana	Captain; Ireland central contract
Liam McCarthy ‡	Ireland	2 January 2002 (age 24)	Left-handed	Right-arm medium-fast	Railway Union	Ireland central contract
Trent McKeegan	Ireland	11 March 2000 (age 26)	Right-handed	Right-arm medium	Brigade	
Robbie Millar	Ireland	11 January 2003 (age 23)	Right-handed	Right-arm off break	Eglinton	
Josh Wilson	Ireland	2 October 2003 (age 22)	Left-handed	Right-arm medium	Newbuildings	
Craig Young ‡	Ireland	4 April 1990 (age 36)	Right-handed	Right arm fast-medium	North Down	Ireland central contract

=== Current and former players ===
- List of North West Warriors cricketers
