= 2024 Inter-Provincial Trophy =

Cricket tournament

- Dates: 1 May – 10 September 2024
- Administrator: Cricket Ireland
- Cricket format: Twenty20
- Tournament format: Double round-robin
- Host: Ireland
- Champions: Leinster Lightning (8th title)
- Runners-up: Northern Knights
- Participants: 4
- Matches: 18
- Most runs: 267 Tim Tector (Leinster Lightning)
- Most wickets: 13 Matthew Foster (Northern Knights)

The 2024 Inter-Provincial Trophy was the twelfth edition of the Inter-Provincial Trophy, a Twenty20 cricket competition in Ireland. It was the eighth edition of the competition played with full Twenty20 status. The tournament began on 1 May 2024 and the last match was held on 10 September 2024. Four provincial teams are taking part in the tournament. In April 2024, Cricket Ireland confirmed the fixtures for the competition. Leinster Lightning are the defending champions.

== Squads ==
Leinster Lightning	Munster Reds	North West Warriors	Northern Knights
George Dockrell (c); Andrew Balbirnie; Chris DeFreitas; David Delany; Fionn Hand; Sam Harbinson; Gavin Hoey; Philippe Le Roux; Josh Little; Seamus Lynch; Barry McCarthy; Byron McDonagh; Mikey O'Reilly; Olly Riley; Adam Rosslee; Amish Sidhu; Harry Tector; Tim Tector; Lorcan Tucker; Reuben Wilson	PJ Moor (c); Curtis Campher; Gareth Delany; Matt Ford; Alistair Frost; Mike Frost; Ryan Hunter; Ryan Joyce; Tyrone Kane; Zubair Khan; Brandon Kruger; Josh Manley; Liam McCarthy; John McNally; Sean McNicholl; Jordan Neill; Matthew Weldon; Ben White	Andy McBrine (c); Liam Doherty; Stephen Doheny; Shane Getkate; Graham Hume; Ryan Macbeth; Scott Macbeth; William McClintock; Trent McKeegan; Cameron Melley; Robbie Millar; Conor Olphert; Gavin Roulston; Jared Wilson; Craig Young; Harry Zimmermann	Mark Adair (c); Ross Adair; Benjamin Calitz; Cade Carmichael; Jake Egan; Matthew Foster; Matthew Humphreys; Tyron Koen; Thomas Mayes; James McCollum; Ruhan Pretorius; Cian Robertson; Neil Rock; Paul Stirling; Morgan Topping; Sam Topping; Theo van Woerkom

== Points table ==
Pos	Team	Pld	W	L	T	NR	Pts	NRR
1	Leinster Lightning (C)	9	7	1	0	1	34	2.025
2	Northern Knights	9	5	3	0	1	25	1.410
3	North West Warriors	9	2	6	0	1	11	−2.057
4	Munster Reds	9	2	6	0	1	11	−2.137

Source: ESPNcricinfo Cricket Ireland
(C) Champions

== Fixtures ==
Match 1
1 May 2024
11:00
Scorecard

Munster Reds; 134/9 (20 overs)	v	Leinster Lightning; 138/4 (15 overs)
Gareth Delany 44 (27); Barry McCarthy 5/3 (4 overs)		Tim Tector 54* (41); Josh Manley 2/24 (3 overs)

Leinster Lightning won by 6 wickets
Sydney Parade, Dublin
Umpires: Jonathan Kennedy (Ire) and Waseem Mohammed (Eng)
Player of the match: Barry McCarthy (Leinster Lightning)

- Leinster Lightning won the toss and elected to field.
- Jordan Neill and John McNally (Munster Reds) both made their T20 debut.
- Barry McCarthy (Leinster Lightning) took his first five-wicket haul in T20s.
- Points: Leinster Lightning 5, Munster Reds 0.

Match 2
1 May 2024
15:30
Scorecard

North West Warriors; 119 (19.2 overs)	v	Northern Knights; 120/3 (14.1 overs)
Scott McBeth 37 (23); Thomas Mayes 4/28 (3.2 overs)		Paul Stirling 59 (43); Trent Mckeegan 1/18 (3 overs)

Northern Knights won by 7 wickets
Sydney Parade, Dublin
Umpires: Jonathan Kennedy (Ire) and Waseem Mohammed (Eng)
Player of the match: Paul Stirling (Northern Knights)

- Northern Knights won the toss and elected field.
- Jake Egan (Northern Knights) and Kian Hilton (North West Warriors) both made their T20 debut.
- Points: Northern Knights 5, North West Warriors 0.

Match 3
2 May 2024
11:00
Scorecard

Northern Knights; 224/5 (20 overs)	v	Munster Reds; 125 (18.5 overs)
Paul Stirling 76 (49); Ben White 1/24 (4 overs)		John McNally 48 (32); Thomas Mayes 3/34 (3.5 overs)

Northern Knights won by 99 runs
Sydney Parade, Dublin
Umpires: Mark Hawthorne and Aidan Seaver
Player of the match: Mark Adair (Northern Knights)

- Munster Reds won the toss and elected to field.
- Points: Northern Knights 5, Munster Reds 0.

Match 4
2 May 2024
15:30
Scorecard

North West Warriors; 148/6 (20 overs)	v	Leinster Lightning; 149/2 (12.5 overs)
Jared Wilson 39 (17); George Dockrell 3/21 (4 overs)		Andrew Balbirnie 81* (44); Graham Hume 1/29 (2.5 overs)

Leinster Lightning won by 8 wickets
Sydney Parade, Dublin
Umpires: Mark Hawthorne and Aidan Seaver
Player of the match: Andrew Balbirnie (Leinster Lightning)

- North West Warriors won the toss and elected to bat.
- Oliver Riley (Leinster Lightning) made his T20 debut.
- Points: Leinster Lightning 5, North West Warriors 0.

Match 5
3 May 2024
11:00
Scorecard

Munster Reds; 57/3 (5 overs)	v	North West Warriors; 37/7 (5 overs)
Curtis Campher 20 (7); Graham Hume 1/15 (2 overs)		Stephen Doheny 16 (9); Curtis Campher 4/15 (2 overs)

Munster Reds won by 20 runs
Sydney Parade, Dublin
Umpires: Roland Black (Ire) and Waseem Mohammed (Eng)
Player of the match: Curtis Campher (Munster Reds)

- North West Warriors won the toss and elected to field.
- The match was reduced to 5 overs per side due to rain.
- Points: Munster Reds 4, North West Warriors 0.

Match 6
3 May 2024
15:30
Scorecard

Northern Knights; 191/9 (20 overs)	v	Leinster Lightning; 192/5 (17.1 overs)
Cade Carmichael 74* (44); Barry McCarthy 3/43 (4 overs)		Tim Tector 69 (36); Thomas Mayes 3/38 (4 overs)

Leinster Lightning won by 5 wickets
Sydney Parade, Dublin
Umpires: Roland Black (Ire) and Waseem Mohammed (Eng)
Player of the match: Tim Tector (Leinster Lightning)

- Leinster Lightning won the toss and elected to field.
- Points: Leinster Lightning 4, Northern Knights 0.

Match 7
8 May 2024
15:30
Scorecard

Northern Knights; 149/5 (20 overs)	v	North West Warriors; 152/5 (19.5 overs)
James McCollum 61* (58); Shane Getkate 2/22 (4 overs)		Jared Wilson 27 (23); Matthew Humphreys 2/26 (4 overs)

North West Warriors won by 5 wickets
Stormont, Belfast
Umpires: George Brolly and Jareth McCready
Player of the match: Cameron Melly (North West Warriors)

- North West Warriors won the toss and elected to field.
- Ben Calitz (Northern Knights) and Gavin Roulston (North West Warriors) both made their T20 debut.
- Points: North West Warriors 4, Northern Knights 0.

Match 8
15 May 2024
15:30
Scorecard

Munster Reds; 159/8 (20 overs)	v	Leinster Lightning; 164/4 (18.3 overs)
Ben Calitz 54* (41); Dylan Lues 3/24 (3 overs)		Tim Tector 65 (43); Josh Manley 3/34 (3.3 overs)

Leinster Lightning won by 6 wickets
Sydney Parade, Dublin
Umpires: Roland Black and Jonathan Kennedy
Player of the match: Tim Tector (Leinster Lightning)

- Munster Reds won the toss and elected to bat.
- Christopher De Freitas, Dylan Lues, Swapnil Modgil, Nicolas Stapleton (Leinster Lightning), Zubair Khan and Oliver Metcalfe (Munster Reds) all made their T20 debut.
- Points: Leinster Lightning 4, Munster Reds 0.

Match 9
21 May 2024
15:30
Scorecard

North West Warriors	v	Leinster Lightning

No result
Bready Cricket Club Ground, Magheramason
Umpires: George Brolly and Roland Black

- Leinster Lightning won the toss and elected to field.
- No play was possible due to rain.
- Jack Lalor (Leinster Lightning) made his T20 debut.
- Points: Leinster Lightning 2, North West Warriors 2.

Match 10
28 May 2024
15:30
Scorecard

Northern Knights; 128/7 (20 overs)	v	Munster Reds
Jake Egan 74 (48); Nicolaj Laegsgaard 3/16 (4 overs)

No result
Stormont, Belfast
Umpires: Jonathan Kennedy and Aidan Seaver

- Munster Reds won the toss and elected to field.
- No further play was possible due to rain.
- Harry Dyer and Jack Dickson (Munster Reds) both made their T20 debut.
- Points: Munster Reds 2, Northern Knights 2.

Match 11
4 June 2024
11:00
Scorecard

North West Warriors; 136/5 (17.2 overs)	v	Munster Reds; 39/4 (5 overs)
Gavin Roulston 50 (47); Carson McCullough 4/25 (4 overs)		Alistair Frost 15 (11); Andy McBrine 2/12 (2 overs)

North West Warriors won by 13 runs (DLS method)
Oak Hill Cricket Club Ground, County Wicklow
Umpires: Azam Baig and Jonathan Kennedy
Player of the match: Gavin Roulston (North West Warriors)

- Munster Reds won the toss and elected to field.
- Munster Reds were set a revised target of 53 runs from 5 overs.
- Sean McNicholl (Munster Reds) made his T20 debut.
- Points: North West Warriors 5, Munster Reds 0.

Match 12
4 June 2024
15:30
Scorecard

Leinster Lightning; 142/9 (20 overs)	v	Northern Knights; 141/8 (20 overs)
Monil Patel 47 (41); Cian Robertson 3/16 (4 overs)		Ruhan Pretorius 58 (46); Fionn Hand 3/22 (3 overs)

Leinster Lightning won by 1 runs
Stormont, Belfast
Umpires: Roland Black and Mark Hawthorne
Player of the match: Fionn Hand (Leinster Lightning)

- Leinster Lightning won the toss and elected to bat.
- Sam Topping (Northern Knights) made his T20 debut.
- Points: Leinster Lightning 4, Northern Knights 0.

Match 13
7 August 2024
15:30
Scorecard

Leinster Lightning; 196/8 (20 overs)	v	Munster Reds; 121 (20 overs)
George Dockrell 41 (25); Michael Frost 2/10 (2 overs)		Brandon Kruger 33 (29); Samuel Harbinson 3/24 (4 overs)

Leinster Lightning won by 75 runs
Richard Beamish Cricket Grounds, Mardyke
Umpires: Azam Baig and Jonathan Kennedy
Player of the match: Gavin Hoey (Leinster Lightning)

- Munster Reds won the toss and elected to field.
- Peter Francis (Munster Reds) made his T20 debut.
- Points: Leinster Lightning 5, Munster Reds 0.

Match 14
14 August 2024
15:30
Scorecard

North West Warriors; 204/6 (20 overs)	v	Northern Knights; 208/5 (19 overs)
Stephen Doheny 84 (50); Cian Robertson 2/25 (4 overs)		Ross Adair 116 (52); Graham Hume 3/51 (4 overs)

Northern Knights won by 5 wickets
Woodvale Road, Eglinton
Umpires: Jonathan Kennedy and Gareth Morrison
Player of the match: Ross Adair (Northern Knights)

- Northern Knights won the toss and elected to field.
- Points: Northern Knights 4, North West Warriors 0.

Match 15
21 August 2024
15:30
Scorecard

Munster Reds; 152 (20 overs)	v	Northern Knights; 158/2 (14.4 overs)
Mark Andrianatos 48 (38); Cade Carmichael 3/19 (2 overs)		Ross Adair 64 (33); Curtis Campher 1/19 (2 overs)

Northern Knights won by 8 wickets
Richard Beamish Cricket Grounds, Mardyke
Umpires: Warren McCully and Gareth Morrison
Player of the match: Ross Adair (Northern Knights)

- Northern Knights won the toss and elected to field.
- Points: Northern Knights 5, Munster Reds 0.

Match 16
28 August 2024
15:30
Scorecard

North West Warriors; 83 (18.4 overs)	v	Leinster Lightning; 86/1 (8 overs)
Cameron Melly 17 (21); Gavin Hoey 3/14 (4 overs)		Lorcan Tucker 60* (26); Ryan MacBeth 1/8 (2 overs)

Leinster Lightning won by 9 wickets
Sydney Parade, Dublin
Umpires: Roland Black and Aidan Seaver
Player of the match: Lorcan Tucker (Leinster Lightning)

- North West Warriors won the toss and elected to bat.
- Jai Moondra (Leinster Lightning) and David O'Sullivan (North West Warriors) both made their T20 debuts.
- Points: Leinster Lightning 5, North West Warriors 0.

Match 17
4 September 2024
15:30
Scorecard

North West Warriors; 131/6 (20 overs)	v	Munster Reds; 137/4 (18.5 overs)
Stephen Doheny 38 (34); Matthew Weldon 2/16 (4 overs)		Curtis Campher 50 (27); Graham Hume 1/22 (3.5 overs)

Munster Reds won by 6 wickets
Bready Cricket Club Ground, Magheramason
Umpires: George Brolly and Mark Hawthorne

- North West Warriors won the toss and elected to bat.
- Matthew Weldon (Munster Reds) made his T20 debut.
- Points: Munster Reds 4, North West Warriors 0

Match 18
10 September 2024
15:30
Scorecard

Northern Knights; 187/4 (20 overs)	v	Leinster Lightning; 156 (18.5 overs)
Jake Egan 58 (32); Melvin Deveraj 2/18 (4 overs)		Christopher De Freitas 40 (29); Matthew Foster 4/33 (3.5 overs)

Northern Knights won by 31 runs
Oak Hill Cricket Club Ground, County Wicklow
Umpires: Jareth McCready and Aidan Seaver
Player of the match: Jake Egan (Northern Knights)

- Northern Knights won the toss and elected to bat.
- Aditya Adey, Matthew Halliday (Northern Knights) and Melvin Deveraj (Leinster Lightning) made their T20 debut.
- Points: Northern Knights 4, Leinster Lightning 0
