= 2021 Inter-Provincial Trophy =

Cricket tournament

- Dates: 18 June – 19 September 2021
- Administrator: Cricket Ireland
- Cricket format: Twenty20
- Tournament format: Round-robin
- Champions: North West Warriors (2nd title)
- Participants: 4
- Matches: 18
- Most runs: Matt Ford (220)
- Most wickets: Ben White (17)

The 2021 Inter-Provincial Trophy was the ninth edition of the Inter-Provincial Trophy, a Twenty20 cricket competition that was played in Ireland in 2021. It was the fifth edition of the competition to be played with full Twenty20 status. The tournament was played as a series of three-day festivals between four teams. On 25 March 2021, Cricket Ireland confirmed the fixtures for the tournament. On 9 April 2021, Cricket Ireland announced the revised fixtures for the tournament, with the number of matches increased from 12 to 18. Leinster Lightning were the defending champions.

After the first round of matches, North West Warriors were leading the competition with two wins from their three games. Defending champions Leinster Lightning suffered two defeats from their three matches. It was the first time that Leinster Lightning had lost back-to-back matches in the Inter-Provincial competition. In the second round of matches, Leinster Lightning won two of their three matches, putting them in second place behind North West Warriors. In the third and final round of matches, the first three games were all abandoned due to the weather. In the last match of the tournament, North West Warriors beat Leinster Lightning by eight wickets to win their second title.

== Points table ==
Team	Pld	W	L	T	NR	Pts
North West Warriors	9	5	3	0	1	25
Northern Knights	9	4	3	0	2	21
Leinster Lightning	9	3	4	0	2	18
Munster Reds	9	3	5	0	1	15

== Fixtures ==
=== Round one ===
18 June 2021
Scorecard

Munster Reds; 148/7 (20 overs)	v	Leinster Lightning; 149/3 (15.1 overs)
Murray Commins 51 (34); David O'Halloran 2/20 (4 overs)		George Dockrell 48* (30); Fionn Hand 1/22 (1 over)

Leinster Lightning won by 7 wickets
Sydney Parade, Dublin
Umpires: Mark Hawthorne and Paul Reynolds
Player of the match: Simi Singh (Leinster Lightning)

- Leinster Lightning won the toss and elected to field.
- David O'Halloran (Leinster Lightning), Mike Frost and Seamus Lynch (Munster Reds) all made their T20 debuts.
- Points: Leinster Lightning 5, Munster Reds 0.

18 June 2021
Scorecard

Northern Knights; 135/9 (20 overs)	v	North West Warriors; 138/3 (11.1 overs)
James McCollum 48 (37); Graham Kennedy 2/21 (3 overs)		Stephen Doheny 54 (27); Ben White 2/38 (3 overs)

North West Warriors won by 7 wickets
Sydney Parade, Dublin
Umpires: Mark Hawthorne and Paul Reynolds
Player of the match: Stephen Doheny (North West Warriors)

- North West Warriors won the toss and elected to field.
- Luke Georgeson (Northern Knights) and Jared Wilson (North West Warriors) both made their T20 debuts.
- Points: North West Warriors 5, Northern Knights 0.

19 June 2021
Scorecard

Northern Knights; 174/7 (20 overs)	v	Leinster Lightning; 152/8 (20 overs)
Luke Georgeson 31 (18); Josh Little 3/26 (4 overs)		Andrew Balbirnie 42 (33); Ben White 3/27 (4 overs)

Northern Knights won by 22 runs
Sydney Parade, Dublin
Umpires: Alan Neill and Roland Black
Player of the match: Ross Adair (Northern Knights)

- Leinster Lightning won the toss and elected to field.
- Points: Northern Knights 4, Leinster Lightning 0.

19 June 2021
Scorecard

North West Warriors; 146/9 (20 overs)	v	Munster Reds; 147/4 (17.1 overs)
Andy McBrine 41 (30); Josh Manley 3/34 (4 overs)		Murray Commins 44 (32); Craig Young 2/34 (4 overs)

Munster Reds won by 6 wickets
Sydney Parade, Dublin
Umpires: Alan Neill and Roland Black
Player of the match: Matt Ford (Munster Reds)

- North West Warriors won the toss and elected to bat.
- Points: Munster Reds 4, North West Warriors 0.

20 June 2021
Scorecard

Leinster Lightning; 182/7 (20 overs)	v	North West Warriors; 183/9 (19.5 overs)
Lorcan Tucker 51 (27); Ross Allen 3/19 (3 overs)		William Porterfield 52 (23); Simi Singh 3/31 (4 overs)

North West Warriors won by 1 wicket
Sydney Parade, Dublin
Umpires: Alan Neill and Paul Reynolds
Player of the match: Craig Young (North West Warriors)

- North West Warriors won the toss and elected to field.
- Points: North West Warriors 4, Leinster Lightning 0.

20 June 2021
Scorecard

Munster Reds; 137/9 (20 overs)	v	Northern Knights; 139/5 (18.3 overs)
Peter Moor 49 (24); Ben White 5/13 (4 overs)		Luke Georgeson 51 (41); Aaron Cawley 2/15 (3 overs)

Northern Knights won by 5 wickets
Sydney Parade, Dublin
Umpires: Alan Neill and Paul Reynolds
Player of the match: Ben White (Northern Knights)

- Munster Reds won the toss and elected to bat.
- Mitchell Thompson (Munster Reds) and Carl Robinson (Northern Knights) both made their T20 debuts.
- Ben White (Northern Knights) took his first five-wicket haul in T20 cricket.
- Points: Northern Knights 4, Munster Reds 0.

=== Round two ===
25 June 2021
Scorecard

North West Warriors; 160/6 (20 overs)	v	Northern Knights; 159/8 (20 overs)
William McClintock 54 (32); Luke Georgeson 2/30 (3 overs)		Neil Rock 45 (30); Graham Kennedy 1/3 (1 over)

North West Warriors won by 1 run
Bready Cricket Club Ground, Magheramason
Umpires: Mark Hawthorne and Roland Black
Player of the match: William McClintock (North West Warriors)

- Northern Knights won the toss and elected to field.
- Ryan MacBeth (North West Warriors) made his T20 debut.
- Points: North West Warriors 4, Northern Knights 0.

25 June 2021
Scorecard

Leinster Lightning; 133/9 (20 overs)	v	Munster Reds; 137/3 (18 overs)
Simi Singh 61 (38); Mike Frost 2/14 (4 overs)		Peter Moor 95* (58); Barry McCarthy 2/25 (3 overs)

Munster Reds won by 7 wickets
Bready Cricket Club Ground, Magheramason
Umpires: Mark Hawthorne and Roland Black
Player of the match: Peter Moor (Munster Reds)

- Munster Reds won the toss and elected to field.
- Alistair Frost (Munster Reds) made his T20 debut.
- Points: Munster Reds 4, Leinster Lightning 0.

26 June 2021
Scorecard

Munster Reds; 120/7 (20 overs)	v	North West Warriors; 122/3 (14.4 overs)
Peter Moor 37 (40); Graham Kennedy 3/19 (4 overs)		William Porterfield 61* (43); Mike Frost 2/28 (4 overs)

North West Warriors won by 7 wickets
Bready Cricket Club Ground, Magheramason
Umpires: Alan Neill and Paul Reynolds
Player of the match: William Porterfield (North West Warriors)

- North West Warriors won the toss and elected to field.
- Points: North West Warriors 5, Munster Reds 0.

26 June 2021
Scorecard

Leinster Lightning; 167 (20 overs)	v	Northern Knights; 97 (16.3 overs)
Simi Singh 57 (47); Ruhan Pretorius 2/29 (4 overs)		Neil Rock 30 (23); Josh Little 3/8 (3 overs)

Leinster Lightning won by 70 runs
Bready Cricket Club Ground, Magheramason
Umpires: Alan Neill and Paul Reynolds
Player of the match: Josh Little (Leinster Lightning)

- Northern Knights won the toss and elected to field.
- Gavin Hoey (Leinster Lightning) made his T20 debut.
- Points: Leinster Lightning 5, Northern Knights 0.

27 June 2021
Scorecard

Leinster Lightning; 127/8 (20 overs)	v	North West Warriors; 111/9 (20 overs)
George Dockrell 55* (44); Andy McBrine 3/19 (4 overs)		William McClintock 35 (35); Barry McCarthy 3/20 (4 overs)

Leinster Lightning won by 16 runs
Bready Cricket Club Ground, Magheramason
Umpires: Alan Neill and Roland Black
Player of the match: Gavin Hoey (Leinster Lightning)

- North West Warriors won the toss and elected to field.
- Points: Leinster Lightning 4, North West Warriors 0.

27 June 2021
Scorecard

Northern Knights; 221/6 (20 overs)	v	Munster Reds; 198/5 (20 overs)
Jeremy Lawlor 81 (42); Matt Ford 2/31 (4 overs)		Matt Ford 57 (40); Mark Adair 2/34 (4 overs)

Northern Knights won by 23 runs
Bready Cricket Club Ground, Magheramason
Umpires: Alan Neill and Roland Black
Player of the match: Jeremy Lawlor (Northern Knights)

- Munster Reds won the toss and elected to field.
- Points: Northern Knights 4, Munster Reds 0.

=== Round three ===
17 September 2021
Scorecard

Northern Knights	v	North West Warriors

Match abandoned
The Green, Comber
Umpires: Alan Neill and Roland Black

- No toss.
- No play was possible due to rain.
- Points: Northern Knights 2, North West Warriors 2.

17 September 2021
Scorecard

Leinster Lightning	v	Munster Reds

Match abandoned
The Green, Comber
Umpires: Alan Neill and Roland Black

- No toss.
- No play was possible due to rain.
- Points: Leinster Lightning 2, Munster Reds 2.

18 September 2021
Scorecard

Northern Knights	v	Leinster Lightning

Match abandoned
The Green, Comber
Umpires: Alan Neill and Roland Black

- No toss.
- No play was possible due to a wet outfield.
- Points: Northern Knights 2, Leinster Lightning 2.

18 September 2021
Scorecard

North West Warriors; 151/6 (20 overs)	v	Munster Reds; 154/4 (15.1 overs)
Graham Hume 52 (24); Matt Ford 2/25 (4 overs)		Matt Ford 63* (37); Conor Olphert 2/26 (4 overs)

Munster Reds won by 6 wickets
The Green, Comber
Umpires: Alan Neill and Roland Black
Player of the match: Matt Ford (Munster Reds)

- Munster Reds won the toss and elected to field.
- Conor Olphert (North West Warriors) made his T20 debut.
- Points: Munster Reds 5, North West Warriors 0.

19 September 2021
Scorecard

Munster Reds; 72/5 (10 overs)	v	Northern Knights; 74/1 (7.4 overs)
Matt Ford 21 (14); Ben White 2/3 (2 overs)		Ross Adair 54* (27); Mike Frost 1/13 (2 overs)

Northern Knights won by 9 wickets
The Green, Comber
Umpires: Aidan Seaver and Roland Black
Player of the match: Ross Adair (Northern Knights)

- Northern Knights won the toss and elected to field.
- The match was reduced to 10 overs per side due to a wet outfield.
- Cian Robertson, Morgan Topping, Thomas Mayes (Northern Knights) and Liam McCarthy (Munster Reds) all made their T20 debuts.
- Points: Northern Knights 5, Munster Reds 0.

19 September 2021
Scorecard

Leinster Lightning; 113/9 (20 overs)	v	North West Warriors; 119/2 (13.5 overs)
Gavin Hoey 37 (28); Conor Olphert 3/27 (4 overs)		William Porterfield 39* (34); David O'Halloran 1/13 (2 overs)

North West Warriors won by 8 wickets
The Green, Comber
Umpires: Aidan Seaver and Roland Black
Player of the match: Conor Olphert (North West Warriors)

- North West Warriors won the toss and elected to field.
- Robbie Millar (North West Warriors) and Theo Lawson (Leinster Lightning) both made their T20 debuts.
- Points: North West Warriors 5, Leinster Lightning 0.
