= Inter-Provincial Trophy =

T20 cricket tournament in Ireland

- Tournament logo
- Administrator: Cricket Ireland
- Format: Twenty20
- First edition: 2013
- Latest edition: 2026
- Next edition: 2027
- Tournament format: Triple round-robin
- Number of teams: 3 (2013–16, 2026); 4 (2017-2025)
- Host: Ireland
- Current champion: Leinster Lightning (10th title)
- Most successful: Leinster Lightning (10 titles)
- 2026

The Inter-Provincial Trophy is a Twenty20 cricket tournament between the provinces of Ireland.

The tournament was first held by three provinces in 2013, across venues in both Northern Ireland and the Republic of Ireland.

Leinster Lightning are the current reigning champions and the most successful team in the competition's history, winning ten titles.

== History ==
=== Background ===
The Ireland cricket team have had huge success recently on the international level which has boosted the popularity of the game in the country. They had earned the reputation of a giant killer after upsetting teams like Pakistan and Bangladesh (2007 Cricket World Cup), and England (2011 Cricket World Cup). Their good performances in major international tournaments meant that Cricket Ireland openly started bidding for Test match status to the International Cricket Council. Nevertheless, one of the main stumbling road blocks for Ireland from getting to play the pinnacle of the game was a lack of a first-class cricket infrastructure at home, among other things. As early as August 2011, Cricket Ireland announced plans of a domestic first-class tournament.

In January 2012, Cricket Ireland announced the ambitious 'Vision 2020' plan which announced the establishment of a first-class structure by 2015 and achievement of Test status by 2020. It also began work on a cricket academy to find talented players across the country and improving grass-roots cricket in the country. For the first time professional contacts, with central, A, B, and C were established. Plans for Test status were established partly to stem the flow of their star cricketers moving away to England in hope of playing Test cricket such as Ed Joyce, Eoin Morgan and Boyd Rankin.

According to Richard Holdsworth in an interview with Setanta Sports, CI were pleased with the strategic progress that had been made as of November 2012. In December 2012, Ireland got a $1.5m boost as increased funding from the ICC to establish elite domestic competitions in the country.

Initially the tournament did not hold List-A T20 status, however this was granted by the ICC starting for the 2017 season. A fourth province, Munster Reds was added in 2017 but was removed in 2026.

== Format ==
The tournament is held as a double round-robin format with each team playing each other twice, once at its home ground and the other leg away.

== Teams ==
According to Richard Holsworth's interview to Setanta Sports, three teams would initially participate in the tournament, Leinster, Northern and North West, representing the three historically strongest provincial unions in Irish cricket, as Munster and Connacht Unions were considered still quite far away from fielding a competitive team for provincial tournaments.

They were also given a separate limited overs brands or names familiar to supporters of the systems in England and Australia, Leinster Lightning, Northern Knights and North West Warriors. Munster were added for the 2017 season, choosing to play under the name Munster Reds but was removed in 2026.

Team	First season	Last season	Titles
Leinster Lightning	2013	2026	10
Northern Knights	2013	2026	2
North West Warriors	2013	2026	2
Munster Reds	2017	2025	0

== Competition placings ==
=== 2013 to present ===
Results of each season are here:

Season	Winner	Second	Third	Fourth
2013	Leinster Lightning	Northern Knights	North West Warriors	DNP
2014	North West Warriors	Leinster Lightning	Northern Knights	DNP
2015	Leinster Lightning	North West Warriors	Northern Knights	DNP
2016	Leinster Lightning	North West Warriors	Northern Knights	DNP
2017	Leinster Lightning	North West Warriors	Northern Knights	Munster Reds
2018	Leinster Lightning	Northern Knights	North West Warriors	Munster Reds
2019	Northern Knights	Leinster Lightning	North West Warriors	Munster Reds
2020	Leinster Lightning	Northern Knights	Munster Reds	North West Warriors
2021	North West Warriors	Northern Knights	Leinster Lightning	Munster Reds
2022	Leinster Lightning	Munster Reds	North West Warriors	Northern Knights
2023	Northern Knights	North West Warriors	Munster Reds	Leinster Lightning
2024	Leinster Lightning	Northern Knights	North West Warriors	Munster Reds
2025	Leinster Lightning	Northern Knights	Munster Reds	North West Warriors
2026	Leinster Lightning	North West Warriors	Northern Knights	DNP

== All-time records ==
(Correct to 6 March 2024)

=== Team records ===
==== Highest innings totals ====
Score	Team	Opps	Venue	Date	Sc
260/3	Leinster Lightning	North West Warriors	Sydney Parade	28 Jul 2022	
247//4	Leinster Lightning	Munster Reds	Anglesea Road	16 Jun 2017	
236/3	Northern Knights	Leinster Lightning	Mardyke	6 Jun 2023	
228/4	Northern Knights	Munster Reds	Sydney Parade	28 Jul 2022	
221/6	Northern Knights	Munster Reds	Bready	27 Jun 2021	

==== Lowest completed innings totals ====
Score	Team	Opps	Venue	Date	Sc
76 ao	Munster Reds	Leinster Lightning	Sydney Parade	20 Aug 2020	
78 ao	North West Warriors	Leinster Lightning	Sydney Parade	21 Jun 2013	
78 ao	North West Warriors	Northern Knights	Sydney Parade	22 Jun 2019	
78 ao	North West Warriors	Northern Knights	Sydney Parade	1 Aug 2023	
80 ao	Munster Reds	Leinster Lightning	Sydney Parade	18 May 2018	

=== Individual records – batting ===
==== Most career runs ====
Runs	Innings	Average	SR	Player	Team(s)
854	32	28.47	123.95	Stephen Doheny	LL, MR, NWW
829	33	26.74	132.43	Simi Singh	Leinster Lightning
799	27	30.73	140.92	Andy Balbirnie	Leinster Lightning
706	42	18.58	121.10	Shane Getkate	NK, NWW
661	44	20.03	117.41	Andy McBrine	North West Warriors

==== Highest individual scores ====
Score	Player	For	Opps	Venue	Date
111	Ross Adair	Northern Knights	North West Warriors	Sydney Parade	27 Jul 2022
110*	John Mooney	Leinster Lightning	North West Warriors	Woodvale Road	25 Jun 2015
109	Simi Singh	Leinster Lightning	Munster Reds	Anglesea Road	16 Jun 2017
102	Murray Commins	Munster Reds	Leinster Lightning	Sydney Parade	27 Jul 2022
98*	Max Sorensen	Leinster Lightning	Munster Reds	Anglesea Road	16 Jun 2017

=== Individual records – bowling ===
==== Most career wickets ====
Wickets	Matches	Average	Econ	Player	Team
61	36	16.44	7.95	Craig Young	North West Warriors
50	42	13.40	6.99	Tyrone Kane	LL, MR
49	48	21.47	6.90	Andy McBrine	North West Warriors
46	37	16.54	6.97	Simi Singh	Leinster Lightning
36	25	15.92	6.69	Eddie Richardson	LL, MR

==== Best bowling in an innings ====
Bowling	Player	Team	Opps	Venue	Date
5/8	Shane Getkate	Northern Knights	North West Warriors	Sydney Parade	22 Jun 2019
5/13	Ben White	Northern Knights	Munster Reds	Sydney Parade	20 Jun 2021
5/13	Matthew Humphreys	Northern Knights	North West Warriors	Sydney Parade	1 Aug 2023
5/15	Craig Young	North West Warriors	Northern Knights	New Strabane Park	16 Jun 2017
5/15	Tyrone Kane	Leinster Lightning	North West Warriors	Anglesea Road	22 May 2015

=== Partnership records ===
==== Highest partnerships ====
Wicket	Runs	Player 1	Player 2	Team	Opps	Venue	Date
3rd	162	Murray Commins	Tyrone Kane	Munster Reds	Leinster Lightning	Sydney Parade	27 Jul 2022
2nd	133	Stephen Doheny	Nathan McGuire	North West Warriors	Northern Knights	Sydney Parade	27 Jul 2022
2nd	132	Simi Singh	Andy Balbirnie	Leinster Lightning	Northern Knights	Sydney Parade	6 Jul 2018
3rd	128	Simi Singh	Max Sorensen	Leinster Lightning	Munster Reds	Anglesea Road	16 Jun 2017
2nd	126	James McCollum	John Matchett	Northern Knights	Munster Reds	Sydney Parade	28 Jul 2022

==== Highest partnerships for each wicket ====
Wicket	Runs	Player 1	Player 2	Team	Opps	Venue	Date
1st	119	Stuart Thompson	David Rankin	North West Warriors	North West Warriors	Bready	6 Jul 2014
2nd	133	Stephen Doheny	Nathan McGuire	North West Warriors	Northern Knights	Sydney Parade	27 Jul 2022
3rd	162	Murray Commins	Tyrone Kane	Munster Reds	Leinster Lightning	Sydney Parade	27 Jul 2022
4th	122*	John Anderson	George Dockrell	Leinster Lightning	North West Warriors	Sydney Parade	7 Jul 2018
5th	97	Andrew McBrine	Aaron Gillespie	North West Warriors	Munster Reds	Sydney Parade	6 Jul 2018
6th	90	Graeme McCarter	Stuart Thompson	North West Warriors	Leinster Lightning	Anglesea Road	22 May 2015
7th	52*	Graham Hume	Ross Allen	North West Warriors	Northern Knights	Bready	20 Aug 2020
8th	38*	Rusty Theron	Jacob Mulder	Northern Knights	Leinster Lightning	Comber	22 Jul 2016
9th	53	Gavin Hoey	Josh Little	Leinster Lightning	North West Warriors	Comber	19 Sep 2021
10th	40	Ryan MacBeth	Scott MacBeth	North West Warriors	Leinster Lightning	Sydney Parade	28 Jul 2022

== See also ==
- Cricket in Ireland
- History of cricket
- Inter-Provincial Championship
- Inter-Provincial Cup
