= 2022 Inter-Provincial Cup =

Cricket tournament

- Dates: 3 May – 4 July 2022
- Administrator: Cricket Ireland
- Cricket format: List A
- Tournament format: Double round-robin
- Champions: Munster Reds (1st title)
- Participants: 4
- Matches: 12

The 2022 Inter-Provincial Cup is the tenth edition of the Inter-Provincial Cup, a List A cricket competition that is taking place in Ireland during 2022. It is the sixth edition of the competition to be played with List A status. On 4 March 2022, Cricket Ireland confirmed the fixtures for the tournament.

Leinster Lightning were the defending champions, having won the tournament for an eighth time in 2021. In the opening match, Leinster Lightning began their title defence with a seven wicket win against North West Warriors, with George Dockrell taking a five-wicket haul. In their next match, Leinster Lightning made 304/6 against Munster Reds, but lost by five wickets after Peter Moor scored 152 runs, the highest individual score in the Inter-Provincial Cup. Munster Reds also made the highest successful run chase in an Inter-Provincial Cup match.

Munster Reds won their first senior title following the abandonment of the final slate of matches.

== Points table ==
| Team | Pld | W | L | T | NR | Pts |
|---|---|---|---|---|---|---|
| Munster Reds | 6 | 3 | 1 | 0 | 2 | 16 |
| North West Warriors | 6 | 2 | 2 | 0 | 2 | 14 |
| Leinster Lightning | 6 | 2 | 1 | 0 | 3 | 14 |
| Northern Knights | 6 | 1 | 4 | 0 | 1 | 6 |

== Fixtures ==
3 May 2022
Scorecard

| North West Warriors; 185 (49.5 overs) | v | Leinster Lightning; 186/3 (43.5 overs) |
| William Porterfield 44 (93); George Dockrell 5/24 (10 overs) | | Harry Tector 76* (88); Graham Hume 2/20 (10 overs) |

Leinster Lightning won by 7 wickets
Sydney Parade, Dublin
Umpires: Jareth McCready and Paul Reynolds
Player of the match: George Dockrell (Leinster Lightning)

- Leinster Lightning won the toss and elected to field.
- Muzamil Sherzad (Leinster Lightning), Scott MacBeth and Jared Wilson (North West Warriors) all made their List A debuts.
- Points: Leinster Lightning 4, North West Warriors 0.

5 May 2022
Scorecard

| Northern Knights; 248/9 (50 overs) | v | Munster Reds; 249/7 (48 overs) |
| James McCollum 53 (82); Mike Frost 2/27 (10 overs) | | Matt Ford 71* (71); Ruhan Pretorius 3/30 (7 overs) |

Munster Reds won by 3 wickets
Stormont, Belfast
Umpires: Mark Hawthorne and Paul Reynolds
Player of the match: Matt Ford (Munster Reds)

- Munster Reds won the toss and elected to field.
- Max Burton, Matthew Humphreys (Northern Knights) and Liam McCarthy (Munster Red) all made their List A debuts.
- Points: Munster Reds 4, Northern Knights 0.

10 May 2022
Scorecard

| Leinster Lightning; 304/6 (50 overs) | v | Munster Reds; 305/5 (46.3 overs) |
| Harry Tector 92 (107); Curtis Campher 2/70 (10 overs) | | Peter Moor 152 (122); Barry McCarthy 2/38 (10 overs) |

Munster Reds won by 5 wickets
Sydney Parade, Dublin
Umpires: Mark Hawthorne and Paul Reynolds
Player of the match: Peter Moor (Munster Reds)

- Munster Reds won the toss and elected to field.
- Theo Dempsey, Gavin Hoey and Mikey O'Reilly (Leinster Lightning) all made their List A debuts.
- Points: Munster Reds 4, Leinster Lightning 0.

12 May 2022
Scorecard

| Northern Knights; 123 (45 overs) | v | North West Warriors; 61/5 (23.2 overs) |
| Aniruddha Chore 48 (85); Graham Hume 4/18 (10 overs) | | Andy McBrine 15 (42); Ruhan Pretorius 3/21 (10 overs) |

Northern Knights won by 12 runs (DLS method)
Bready Cricket Club Ground, Magheramason
Umpires: Mark Hawthorne and Jareth McCready
Player of the match: Ruhan Pretorius (Northern Knights)

- North West Warriors won the toss and elected to field.
- North West Warriors were set a revised target of 74 runs from 23.2 overs due to rain.
- Points: Northern Knights 4, North West Warriors 0.

17 May 2022
Scorecard

| Leinster Lightning; 59/2 (16 overs) | v | Northern Knights |
| Andrew Balbirnie 26 (43); Matthew Humphreys 1/14 (4 overs) |

No result
Stormont, Belfast
Umpires: Mark Hawthorne and Roland Black

- Northern Knights won the toss and elected to field.
- No further play was possible due to rain.
- Points: Leinster Lightning 2, Northern Knights 2.

19 May 2022
Scorecard

| North West Warriors; 235 (49.1 overs) | v | Munster Reds; 90 (32.3 overs) |
| Andy McBrine 100 (121); Mike Frost 5/42 (10 overs) | | Murray Commins 24 (51); Andy McBrine 2/11 (7 overs) |

North West Warriors won by 145 runs
The Mardyke, Cork
Umpires: Aidan Seaver and Paul Reynolds
Player of the match: Andy McBrine (North West Warriors)

- Munster Reds won the toss and elected to field.
- Andy McBrine (North West Warriors) scored his first century in List A cricket.
- Mike Frost (Munster Reds) took his first five-wicket haul in List A cricket.
- Points: North West Warriors 5, Munster Reds 0.

23 May 2022
Scorecard

| North West Warriors | v | Leinster Lightning |

Match abandoned
Woodvale Road, Eglinton
Umpires: Mark Hawthorne and Roland Black

- No toss.
- No play was possible due to rain.
- Points: North West Warriors 2, Leinster Lightning 2.

24 May 2022
Scorecard

| Munster Reds; 265/7 (49 overs) | v | Northern Knights; 246 (45.2 overs) |
| Kevin O'Brien 66 (75); Josh Manley 3/56 (10 overs) | | Mark Adair 108 (78); Mike Frost 3/57 (9 overs) |

Munster Reds won by 19 runs (DLS method)
The Mardyke, Cork
Umpires: Azam Baig and Paul Reynolds
Player of the match: Mark Adair (Northern Knights)

- Munster Reds won the toss and elected to bat.
- Northern Knights were set a revised target of 266 runs from 49 overs due to rain.
- Adam Hickey (Munster Reds) made his List A debut.
- Mark Adair (Northern Knights) scored his first century in List A cricket.
- Points: Munster Reds 4, Northern Knights 0.

2 June 2022
Scorecard

| North West Warriors; 304/4 (50 overs) | v | Northern Knights; 241 (46.1 overs) |
| Andy McBrine 117 (130); Thomas Mayes 1/44 (9 overs) | | Aniruddha Chore 65 (85); Conor Olphert 3/83 (10 overs) |

North West Warriors won by 63 runs
Stormont, Belfast
Umpires: Mark Hawthorne and Roland Black
Player of the match: Andy McBrine (North West Warriors)

- Northern Knights won the toss and elected to field.
- Thomas Mayes (Northern Knights) made his List A debut.
- Points: North West Warriors 5, Northern Knights 0.

7 June 2022
Scorecard

| Leinster Lightning; 135 (37.1 overs) | v | Munster Reds; 55/3 (13.2 overs) |
| Simi Singh 38 (50); Liam McCarthy 3/23 (6 overs) | | Tyrone Kane 24 (25); Barry McCarthy 2/34 (7 overs) |

No result
The Mardyke, Cork
Umpires: Aidan Seaver and Mark Hawthorne

- Munster Reds won the toss and elected to field.
- No further play was possible due to rain.
- Cormac Hassett (Munster Reds) made his List A debut.
- Points: Leinster Lightning 2, Munster Reds 2.

1 July 2022
Scorecard

| North West Warriors | v | Munster Reds |

Match abandoned
Woodvale Road, Eglinton
Umpires: Mark Hawthorne and Roland Black

- No toss.
- No play was possible due to rain.
- Series: Munster Reds won the 2022 Inter-Provincial Cup.
- Points: North West Warrios 2, Munster Reds 2

4 July 2022
Scorecard

| Leinster Lightning; 315/9 (50 overs) | v | Northern Knights; 261 all out (42.5 overs) |
| Barry McCarthy 110 (59); Matthew Humphreys 3/43 (10 overs) | | Neil Rock 81 (58); George Dockrell 5/49 (6.5 overs) |

Leinster Lightning won by 54 runs
Sydney Parade, Dublin
Umpires: Jareth McCready and Mark Hawthorne
Player of the match: Barry McCarthy (Leinster Lightning)

- Northern Knights won the toss and elected to field.
- Cian Robertson and Cade Carmichael (Northern Knights) both made their List A debuts.
- Points: Leinster Lightning 4, Northern Knights 0
