= 2021 Inter-Provincial Cup =

Cricket tournament

- Dates: 1 May – 30 June 2021
- Administrator: Cricket Ireland
- Cricket format: List A
- Tournament format: Double round-robin
- Champions: Leinster Lightning (8th title)
- Participants: 4
- Matches: 12
- Most runs: George Dockrell (364)
- Most wickets: Barry McCarthy (17)

The 2021 Inter-Provincial Cup was the ninth edition of the Inter-Provincial Cup, a List A cricket competition that took place in Ireland during 2021. It was the fifth edition of the competition to be played with List A status. The number of teams was increased from three to four, with Munster Reds playing in the tournament for the first time. On 25 March 2021, Cricket Ireland confirmed the fixtures for the tournament. On 9 April 2021, Cricket Ireland announced the revised fixtures for the tournament.

Leinster Lightning were the defending champions. Leinster Lightning retained their title, winning four of their six matches.

== Points table ==
Team	Pld	W	L	T	NR	Pts
Leinster Lightning	6	4	1	0	1	20
North West Warriors	6	3	2	0	1	15
Northern Knights	6	1	3	0	2	8
Munster Reds	6	1	3	0	2	8

== Fixtures ==
1 May 2021
Scorecard

North West Warriors; 204 (48.5 overs)	v	Leinster Lightning; 207/4 (47.3 overs)
Graham Hume 44* (54); Barry McCarthy 4/32 (9.5 overs)		Jamie Grassi 82 (131); Graham Hume 2/39 (10 overs)

Leinster Lightning won by 6 wickets
Sydney Parade, Dublin
Umpires: Alan Neill and Aiden Seaver

- Leinster Lightning won the toss and elected to field.
- David O'Halloran and Tim Tector (Leinster Lightning) both made their List A debuts.
- Points: Leinster Lightning 4, North West Warriors 0.

4 May 2021
Scorecard

Leinster Lightning; 251/6 (50 overs)	v	Northern Knights; 163 (38.1 overs)
George Dockrell 100* (84); Graeme McCarter 2/27 (10 overs)		Luke Georgeson 46 (76); Peter Chase 3/37 (7.1 overs)

Leinster Lightning won by 70 runs (DLS method)
Sydney Parade, Dublin
Umpires: Mark Hawthorne and Paul Reynolds
Player of the match: George Dockrell (Leinster Lightning)

- Northern Knights won the toss and elected to field.
- Northern Knights were set a revised target of 234 runs from 42 overs due to rain.
- George Dockrell (Leinster Lightning) scored his first century in List A cricket.
- Points: Leinster Lightning 5, Northern Knights 0.

6 May 2021
Scorecard

Munster Reds; 219 (41.5 overs)	v	North West Warriors; 220/5 (38.3 overs)
Murray Commins 61 (74); Ross Allen 3/40 (7 overs)		Stuart Thompson 42 (42); Josh Manley 1/23 (6 overs)

North West Warriors won by 5 wickets
Woodvale Road, Eglinton
Umpires: Alan Neill and Roland Black
Player of the match: Andy McBrine (North West Warriors)

- North West Warriors won the toss and elected to field.
- The match was reduced to 43 overs per side due to rain.
- Aaron Cawley, Seamus Lynch, Cormac McLoughlin-Gavin and Amish Sidhu (Munster Reds) all made their List A debuts.
- Points: North West Warriors 4, Munster Reds 0.

16 May 2021
Scorecard

Leinster Lightning; 243/7 (50 overs)	v	Northern Knights; 244/5 (43.5 overs)
Andrew Balbirnie 126 (151); Luke Georgeson 3/44 (8 overs)		Jeremy Lawlor 80* (112); Barry McCarthy 3/64 (10 overs)

Northern Knights won by 5 wickets
The Green, Comber
Umpires: Alan Neill and Roland Black
Player of the match: Paul Stirling (Northern Knights)

- Northern Knights won the toss and elected to field.
- Points: Northern Knights 4, Leinster Lightning 0.

18 May 2021
Scorecard

North West Warriors; 298/7 (50 overs)	v	Northern Knights; 236 (48.1 overs)
William Porterfield 73 (97); Mark Adair 2/33 (10 overs)		Jeremy Lawlor 95 (117); Craig Young 4/55 (10 overs)

North West Warriors won by 62 runs
Stormont, Belfast
Umpires: Jareth McCready and Roland Black
Player of the match: William McClintock (North West Warriors)

- Northern Knights won the toss and elected to field.
- John Matchett (Northern Knights) made his List A debut.
- Points: North West Warriors 5, Northern Knights 0.

20 May 2021
Scorecard

Munster Reds; 147/6 (23 overs)	v	Leinster Lightning; 69/1 (9.5 overs)
Matt Ford 45* (35); Barry McCarthy 2/18 (5 overs)		Kevin O'Brien 38* (30); Josh Manley 1/20 (3 overs)

No result
Sydney Parade, Dublin
Umpires: Aidan Seaver and Paul Reynolds

- Leinster Lightning won the toss and elected to field.
- The match was reduced to 23 overs per side due to rain.
- Rain during Leinster Lightning's innings prevented any further play.
- Matt Ford (Munster Reds) made his List A debut.
- Points: Leinster Lightning 2, Munster Reds 2.

21 May 2021
Scorecard

North West Warriors	v	Northern Knights

Match abandoned
Bready Cricket Club Ground, Magheramason
Umpires: Alan Neill and Roland Black

- No toss.
- No play was possible due to rain.
- Points: North West Warriors 2, Northern Knights 2.

22 May 2021
Scorecard

Leinster Lightning; 271 (48.3 overs)	v	Munster Reds; 178 (42.3 overs)
George Dockrell 88 (86); Tyrone Kane 4/46 (8.3 overs)		Murray Commins 50 (92); Barry McCarthy 6/39 (9.3 overs)

Leinster Lightning won by 93 runs
Sydney Parade, Dublin
Umpires: Azam Baig and Mark Hawthorne
Player of the match: Barry McCarthy (Leinster Lightning)

- Munster Reds won the toss and elected to field.
- Jack Carty (Munster Reds) made his List A debut.
- Points: Leinster Lightning 5, Munster Reds 0.

25 May 2021
Scorecard

North West Warriors; 231 (49.3 overs)	v	Leinster Lightning; 235/6 (48.5 overs)
Andy McBrine 72 (112); David O'Halloran 4/45 (7 overs)		Andrew Balbirnie 85* (110); Craig Young 2/43 (10 overs)

Leinster Lightning won by 4 wickets
Woodvale Road, Eglinton
Umpires: Mark Hawthorne and Paul Reynolds
Player of the match: Andrew Balbirnie (Leinster Lightning)

- Leinster Lightning won the toss and elected to field
- Points: Leinster Lightning 4, North West Warriors 0.

27 May 2021
Scorecard

Northern Knights; 276 (49.5 overs)	v	Munster Reds; 87/2 (17 overs)
Luke Georgeson 63 (89); Josh Manley 4/43 (9.5 overs)		Peter Moor 35 (45); Matthew Foster 1/18 (4 overs)

No result
Sydney Parade, Dublin
Umpires: Mark Hawthorne and Paul Reynolds

- Munster Reds won the toss and elected to field.
- Rain during Munster Reds' innings prevented any further play.
- Points: Munster Reds 2, Northern Knights 2.

15 June 2021
Scorecard

Munster Reds; 289/6 (50 overs)	v	North West Warriors; 292/6 (47.1 overs)
Murray Commins 79 (99); Craig Young 3/48 (10 overs)		William Porterfield 110 (123); Fionn Hand 2/48 (10 overs)

North West Warriors won by 4 wickets
The Mardyke, Cork
Umpires: Alan Neill and Roland Black
Player of the match: William Porterfield (North West Warriors)

- North West Warriors won the toss and elected to field.
- Kyle Magee (North West Warriors) made his List A debut.
- Points: North West Warriors 4, Munster Reds 0.

30 June 2021
Scorecard

Munster Reds; 309/4 (50 overs)	v	Northern Knights; 300/8 (50 overs)
Murray Commins 125 (130); Ruhan Pretorius 1/38 (8 overs)		Luke Georgeson 128 (118); Josh Manley 3/51 (10 overs)

Munster Reds won by 9 runs
Stormont, Belfast
Umpires: Mark Hawthorne and Roland Black
Player of the match: Murray Commins (Munster Reds)

- Munster Reds won the toss and elected to bat.
- Ross Adair (Northern Knights), Alistair Frost and Mitchell Thompson (Munster Reds) all made their List A debuts.
- Points: Munster Reds 4, Northern Knights 0.
