= Ireland at the Men's T20 World Cup =

Ireland national team performance at T20 World Cup

The Ireland cricket team is one of the full members of the International Cricket Council (ICC), it represents all of Ireland (Republic of Ireland and Northern Ireland). The team is administered by Cricket Ireland. They became associate members in 1993, and were granted full member status in 2017. They qualified for their first T20 World Cup in 2009, after winning the 2008 qualifier, they have qualified for every edition of the tournament since then. In eight editions that they have played, they have a win–loss record of 7–18 from 30 matches.

== T20 World Cup record ==
Men's T20 World Cup record										Qualification record (Note: WCL Division One served as the qualifier for the 2007 edition.)				
Year	Round	Position	Pld	W	L	T	NR	Ab (Note: Abandoned matches are not counted in the official records.)	Cap.	Pld	W	L	T	NR
(South Africa) 2007	Did not qualify									5	1	4	0	0
(England) 2009	Super 8	8/12	5	1	4	0	0	0	William Porterfield	4	3	0	0	1
(Cricket West Indies) 2010	Group stage	9/12	2	0	1	0	1	0	William Porterfield	7	4	3	0	0
(Sri Lanka) 2012	Group stage	9/12	2	0	1	0	1	0	William Porterfield	8	7	1	0	0
(Bangladesh) 2014	First round	13/16	3	2	1	0	0	0	William Porterfield	9	8	0	0	1
(India) 2016	First round	15/16	3	0	2	0	1	0	William Porterfield	8	4	3	0	1
(United Arab Emirates) (Oman) 2021	First round	14/16	3	1	2	0	0	0	Andrew Balbirnie	8	5	3	0	0
(Australia) 2022	Super 12	11/16	8	3	4	0	0	1	Andrew Balbirnie	5	3	2	0	0
(United States) (Cricket West Indies) 2024	Group stage	18/20	4	0	3	0	0	1	Paul Stirling	6	4	1	0	1
(India) (Sri Lanka) 2026	Group stage	13/20	4	1	2	0	0	1	Paul Stirling (Note: Stirling was named captain in the original squad but was replaced by Lorcan Tucker after sustaining an injury during the team's second match.)	Qualified via T20I rankings (11th place)				
(Australia) (New Zealand) 2028	Qualified									Qualified via T20I rankings (12th place)				
(England) (Ireland) (Scotland) 2030	Qualified as hosts									Qualified as hosts				
Total	0 Titles	11/12	34	8	20	0	3	3	—N/a	55	38	13	0	4

=== Record by opponents ===
Positive Record Neutral Record Negative Record

Opponent	M	W	L	T+W	T+L	NR	Ab	Win %	First played
Afghanistan	1	0	0	0	0	0	1	—	2022
Australia	3	0	3	0	0	0	0	0.00	2012
Bangladesh	2	1	0	0	0	1	0	100	2009
Canada	1	0	1	0	0	0	0	0.00	2024
England	2	1	0	0	0	1	0	100	2010
India	2	0	2	0	0	0	0	0.00	2009
Namibia	1	0	1	0	0	0	0	0.00	2021
Netherlands	3	1	2	0	0	0	0	33.33	2014
New Zealand	2	0	2	0	0	0	0	0.00	2009
Oman	2	1	1	0	0	0	0	50.00	2016
Pakistan	2	0	2	0	0	0	0	0.00	2009
Scotland	1	1	0	0	0	0	0	100	2022
Sri Lanka	4	0	4	0	0	0	0	0.00	2009
United Arab Emirates	1	1	0	0	0	0	0	100	2014
United States	1	0	0	0	0	0	1	—	2024
West Indies	3	1	1	0	0	1	0	50.00	2010
Zimbabwe	3	1	1	0	0	0	1	50.00	2014
Total	34	8	20	0	0	3	3	28.57	—
Source: Last Updated: 17 February 2026

== Tournament results ==
=== 2009 World Cup ===
Squad

- William Porterfield (c)
- Andre Botha
- Jeremy Bray
- Peter Connell
- Alex Cusack
- Trent Johnston
- Kyle McCallan
- John Mooney
- Kevin O'Brien
- Niall O'Brien (wk)
- Boyd Rankin
- Paul Stirling
- Regan West
- Andrew White
- Gary Wilson (wk)

Results

Event	Group stage (Group A)			Super 8s (Group F)				Semifinal	Final	Overall Result
Event	Opposition Result	Opposition Result	Rank	Opposition Result	Opposition Result	Opposition Result	Rank	Opposition Result	Opposition Result	Overall Result
2009	Bangladesh; Won by 6 wickets	India; Lost by 8 wickets	2	New Zealand; Lost by 83 runs	Sri Lanka; Lost by 9 runs	Pakistan; Lost by 39 runs	4	Did not advance		Super 8s
Source: Cricinfo

Scorecards

Group stage (Group A)

8 June 2009
13:30
Scorecard

Bangladesh; 137/8 (20 overs)	v	Ireland; 138/4 (18.2 overs)
Mashrafe Mortaza 33* (16); Trent Johnston 3/20 (4 overs)		Niall O'Brien 40 (25); Mashrafe Mortaza 2/30 (4 overs)

Ireland won by 6 wickets
Trent Bridge, Nottingham
Umpires: Nigel Llong (Eng) and Simon Taufel (Aus)
Player of the match: Niall O'Brien (Ire)

- Ireland won the toss and elected to field.
- Ireland qualified for the Super 8s as a result of match.

10 June 2009
17:30 (D/N)
Scorecard

Ireland; 112/8 (18 overs)	v	India; 113/2 (15.3 overs)
Andrew White 29 (25); Zaheer Khan 4/19 (3 overs)		Rohit Sharma 52* (45); Regan West 1/23 (4 overs)

India won by 8 wickets
Trent Bridge, Nottingham
Umpires: Ian Gould (Eng) and Nigel Llong (Eng)
Player of the match: Zaheer Khan (Ind)

- India won the toss and elected to field.
- Rain prior to the match delayed the start and shortened the game to 18 overs a side.

Super 8s (Group F)

11 June 2009
13:30
Scorecard

New Zealand; 198/5 (20 overs)	v	Ireland; 115 (16.4 overs)
Aaron Redmond 63 (30); Kyle McCallan 2/33 (4 overs)		Andre Botha 28 (17); Nathan McCullum 3/15 (3 overs)

New Zealand won by 83 runs
Trent Bridge, Nottingham
Umpires: Asoka de Silva (SL) and Marais Erasmus (SA)
Player of the match: Aaron Redmond (NZ)

- Ireland won the toss and elected to field.

14 June 2009
13:30
Scorecard

Sri Lanka; 144/9 (20 overs)	v	Ireland; 135/7 (20 overs)
Mahela Jayawardene 78 (53); Alex Cusack 4/18 (3 overs)		John Mooney 31* (21); Lasith Malinga 2/19 (4 overs)

Sri Lanka won by 9 runs
Lord's, London
Umpires: Marais Erasmus (SA) and Tony Hill (NZ)
Player of the match: Mahela Jayawardene (SL)

- Sri Lanka won the toss and elected to bat.
- Ireland were eliminated as a result of this match.

15 June 2009
13:30
Scorecard

Pakistan; 159/5 (20 overs)	v	Ireland; 120/9 (20 overs)
Kamran Akmal 57 (51); Kyle McCallan 2/26 (4 overs)		William Porterfield 40 (36); Saeed Ajmal 4/19 (4 overs)

Pakistan won by 39 runs
The Oval, London
Umpires: Rudi Koertzen (SA) and Rod Tucker (Aus)
Player of the match: Kamran Akmal (Pak)

- Pakistan won the toss and elected to bat.

=== 2010 World Cup ===
Squad and kit

- William Porterfield (c)
- Andre Botha
- Peter Connell
- Alex Cusack
- George Dockrell
- Trent Johnston
- Nigel Jones
- Gary Kidd
- John Mooney
- Kevin O'Brien
- Niall O'Brien (wk)
- Boyd Rankin
- Paul Stirling
- Andrew White
- Gary Wilson (wk)

2010 kit

Results

Event	Group stage (Group D)			Super 8s		Semifinal	Final	Overall Result
Event	Opposition Result	Opposition Result	Rank	Opposition Result	Rank	Opposition Result	Opposition Result	Overall Result
2010	West Indies; Lost by 70 runs	England; No result	3	Did not advance				Group stage
Source: Cricinfo

Scorecards

Group stage (Group D)

30 April
17:00 (D/N)
Scorecard

West Indies; 138/9 (20 overs)	v	Ireland; 68 (16.4 overs)
Darren Sammy 30 (17); George Dockrell 3/16 (4 overs)		Gary Wilson 17 (34); Darren Sammy 3/8 (3.4 overs)

West Indies won by 70 runs
Providence Stadium, Guyana
Umpires: Asad Rauf (Pak) and Billy Bowden (NZ)
Player of the match: Darren Sammy (WI)

- West Indies won the toss and elected to bat.

4 May
13:30
Scorecard

England; 120/8 (20 overs)	v	Ireland; 14/1 (3.3 overs)
Eoin Morgan 45 (37); Kevin O'Brien 2/22 (3 overs)		Niall O'Brien 9* (5); Ryan Sidebottom 1/9 (1.3 overs)

No result
Providence Stadium, Guyana
Umpires: Billy Bowden (NZ) and Tony Hill (NZ)

- Ireland won the toss and elected to field.
- Rain reduced Ireland's innings to 3.3 overs, causing the match to be abandoned.

=== 2012 World Cup ===
Squad and kit

- William Porterfield (c)
- Kevin O'Brien (vc)
- Alex Cusack
- George Dockrell
- Trent Johnston
- Nigel Jones
- Ed Joyce
- Tim Murtagh
- Niall O'Brien (wk)
- Boyd Rankin
- Max Sorensen
- Paul Stirling
- Stuart Thompson
- Andrew White
- Gary Wilson (wk)

2012 kit

Results

Event	Group stage (Group B)			Super 8s		Semifinal	Final	Overall Result
Event	Opposition Result	Opposition Result	Rank	Opposition Result	Rank	Opposition Result	Opposition Result	Overall Result
2012	Australia; Lost by 7 wickets	West Indies; No result	3	Did not advance				Group stage
Source: Cricinfo

Scorecards

Group stage (Group B)

19 September
15:30 (D/N)
Scorecard

Ireland; 123/7 (20 overs)	v	Australia; 125/3 (15.1 overs)
Kevin O'Brien 35 (29); Shane Watson 3/26 (4 overs)		Shane Watson 51 (30); Kevin O'Brien 1/18 (3 overs)

Australia won by 7 wickets
R. Premadasa Stadium, Colombo
Umpires: Aleem Dar (Pak) and Kumar Dharmasena (SL)
Player of the match: Shane Watson (Aus)

- Ireland won the toss and elected to bat

24 September
19:30 (D/N)
Scorecard

Ireland; 129/6 (19 overs)	v	West Indies
Niall O'Brien 25 (21); Chris Gayle 2/21 (3 overs)

No result
R. Premadasa Stadium, Colombo
Umpires: Asad Rauf (Pak) and Kumar Dharmasena (SL)

- West Indies won the toss and elected to field
- The match was reduced to 19 overs per side due to rain
- Match abandoned before West Indies could start their innings
- Ireland were eliminated by virtue of a superior Net run rate and Ireland were eliminated

=== 2014 World Cup ===
Squad and kit

- William Porterfield (c)
- Kevin O'Brien (vc)
- Alex Cusack
- George Dockrell
- Ed Joyce
- Andrew McBrine
- Tim Murtagh
- Niall O'Brien (wk)
- Andrew Poynter
- Max Sorensen
- James Shannon
- Paul Stirling
- Stuart Thompson
- Gary Wilson (wk)
- Craig Young

2014 kit

Results

Event	First stage (Group B)				Super 10		Semifinal	Final	Overall Result
Event	Opposition Result	Opposition Result	Opposition Result	Rank	Opposition Result	Rank	Opposition Result	Opposition Result	Overall Result
2014	Zimbabwe; Won by 3 wickets	United Arab Emirates; Won by 21 runs (DLS)	Netherlands; Lost by 6 wickets	3	Did not advance				First stage
Source: Cricinfo

Scorecards

First round (Group B)

17 March 2014
Scorecard

Zimbabwe; 163/5 (20 overs)	v	Ireland; 164/7 (20 overs)
Brendan Taylor 59 (46); George Dockrell 2/18 (4 overs)		Paul Stirling 60 (34); Tinashe Panyangara 4/37 (4 overs)

Ireland won by 3 wickets
Sylhet International Cricket Stadium, Sylhet

19 March 2014
Scorecard

United Arab Emirates; 123/6 (20 overs)	v	Ireland; 103/3 (14.2 overs)
Shaiman Anwar 30 (28); Paul Stirling 2/12 (3 overs)		Ed Joyce 43 (38); Sharif Asadullah 2/21 (3 overs)

Ireland won by 21 runs (D/L method)
Sylhet International Cricket Stadium, Sylhet

21 March 2014
Scorecard

Ireland; 189/4 (20 overs)	v	Netherlands; 193/4 (13.5 overs)
Andrew Poynter 57 (38); Ahsan Malik 2/26 (4 overs)		Stephan Myburgh 63 (23); Kevin O'Brien 2/29 (3 overs)

Netherlands won by 6 wickets
Sylhet International Cricket Stadium, Sylhet

=== 2016 World Cup ===
Squad and kit

- William Porterfield (c)
- Andrew Balbirnie (vc)
- George Dockrell
- Andy McBrine
- Tim Murtagh
- Kevin O'Brien
- Niall O'Brien (wk)
- Andrew Poynter
- Stuart Poynter (wk)
- Boyd Rankin
- Max Sorensen
- Paul Stirling
- Stuart Thompson
- Gary Wilson (wk)
- Craig Young

2016 kit

Results

Event	First round (Group A)				Super 10		Semifinal	Final	Overall Result
Event	Opposition Result	Opposition Result	Opposition Result	Rank	Opposition Result	Rank	Opposition Result	Opposition Result	Overall Result
2016	Oman; Lost by 2 wickets	Bangladesh; No result	Netherlands; Lost by 12 runs	4	Did not advance				First round
Source: Cricinfo

Scorecards

First round (Group A)

9 March 2016
19:30 (D/N)
Scorecard

Ireland; 154/5 (20 overs)	v	Oman; 157/8 (19.4 overs)
Gary Wilson 38 (34); Munis Ansari 3/37 (4 overs)		Zeeshan Maqsood 38 (33); Andy McBrine 2/15 (3 overs)

Oman won by 2 wickets
Himachal Pradesh Cricket Association Stadium, Dharamshala
Umpires: Chris Gaffaney (NZ) and Nigel Llong (Eng)
Player of the match: Amir Ali (Oma)

- Ireland won the toss and elected to bat.

11 March 2016
19:30 (D/N)
Scorecard

Bangladesh; 94/2 (8 overs)	v	Ireland
Tamim Iqbal 47 (26); George Dockrell 1/18 (2 overs)

No result
Himachal Pradesh Cricket Association Stadium, Dharamshala
Umpires: Nigel Llong (Eng) and Rod Tucker (Aus)

- Ireland won the toss and elected to field.
- The match was reduced to 12 overs per side due to rain.
- Rain stopped play in Bangladesh's innings and no further play was possible.
- Ireland were eliminated as a result of this match.

13 March 2016
15:00 (D/N)
Scorecard

Netherlands; 59/5 (6 overs)	v	Ireland; 47/7 (6 overs)
Stephan Myburgh 27 (18); George Dockrell 3/7 (2 overs)		Paul Stirling 15 (7); Paul van Meekeren 4/11 (2 overs)

Netherlands won by 12 runs
Himachal Pradesh Cricket Association Stadium, Dharamshala
Umpires: Nigel Llong (Eng) and Sundaram Ravi (Ind)
Player of the match: Paul van Meekeren (Ned)

- Ireland won the toss and elected to field.
- The match was reduced to six overs per side due to rain.

=== 2021 World Cup ===
Squad and kit

- Andrew Balbirnie (c)
- Mark Adair
- Curtis Campher
- Gareth Delany
- George Dockrell
- Josh Little
- Andy McBrine
- Kevin O'Brien
- Neil Rock (wk)
- Simi Singh
- Paul Stirling
- Harry Tector
- Lorcan Tucker (wk)
- Ben White

Reserve players:

- Shane Getkate
- Graham Kennedy
- Barry McCarthy

2021 kit

Results

Event	First round (Group A)				Super 12		Semifinal	Final	Overall Result
Event	Opposition Result	Opposition Result	Opposition Result	Rank	Opposition Result	Rank	Opposition Result	Opposition Result	Overall Result
2021	Netherlands; Won by 7 wickets	Sri Lanka; Lost by 70 runs	Namibia; Lost by 8 wickets	3	Did not advance				First round
Source: Cricinfo

Scorecards

First round (Group A)

18 October 2021
14:00
Scorecard

Netherlands; 106 (20 overs)	v	Ireland; 107/3 (15.1 overs)
Max O'Dowd 51 (47); Curtis Campher 4/26 (4 overs)		Gareth Delany 44 (29); Pieter Seelaar 1/14 (2.1 overs)

Ireland won by 7 wickets
Sheikh Zayed Cricket Stadium, Abu Dhabi
Umpires: Marais Erasmus (SA) and Rod Tucker (Aus)
Player of the match: Curtis Campher (Ire)

- Netherlands won the toss and elected to bat.
- Curtis Campher became the first bowler for Ireland to take a hat-trick in T20Is.
- Curtis Campher also became the third bowler to take four wickets in four balls in T20Is.

20 October 2021
18:00 (N)
Scorecard

Sri Lanka; 171/7 (20 overs)	v	Ireland; 101 (18.3 overs)
Wanindu Hasaranga 71 (47); Josh Little 4/23 (4 overs)		Andrew Balbirnie 41 (39); Maheesh Theekshana 3/17 (4 overs)

Sri Lanka won by 70 runs
Sheikh Zayed Cricket Stadium, Abu Dhabi
Umpires: Nitin Menon (Ind) and Paul Wilson (Aus)
Player of the match: Wanindu Hasaranga (SL)

- Ireland won the toss and elected to field.

22 October 2021
14:00
Scorecard

Ireland; 125/8 (20 overs)	v	Namibia; 126/2 (18.3 overs)
Paul Stirling 38 (24); Jan Frylinck 3/21 (4 overs)		Gerhard Erasmus 53* (49); Curtis Campher 2/14 (3 overs)

Namibia won by 8 wickets
Sharjah Cricket Stadium, Sharjah
Umpires: Chris Brown (NZ) and Aleem Dar (Pak)
Player of the match: David Wiese (Nam)

- Ireland won the toss and elected to bat.

=== 2022 World Cup ===
Squad and kit

- Andrew Balbirnie (c)
- Paul Stirling (vc)
- Mark Adair
- Curtis Campher
- Gareth Delany
- George Dockrell
- Stephen Doheny
- Fionn Hand
- Graham Hume
- Josh Little
- Barry McCarthy
- Conor Olphert
- Simi Singh
- Harry Tector
- Lorcan Tucker (wk)

2022 kit

Results

Event	First round (Group A)				Super 12 (Group 1)						Semifinal	Final	Overall Result
Event	Opposition Result	Opposition Result	Opposition Result	Rank	Opposition Result	Opposition Result	Opposition Result	Opposition Result	Opposition Result	Rank	Opposition Result	Opposition Result	Overall Result
2022	Zimbabwe; Lost by 31 runs	Scotland; Won by 6 wickets	West Indies; Won by 9 wickets	3	Sri Lanka; Lost by 9 wickets	England; Won by 5 runs (DLS)	Afghanistan; Match abandoned	Australia; Lost by 42 runs	New Zealand; Lost by 35 runs	5	Did not advance		Super 10
Source: Cricinfo

Scorecards

First round (Group A)

17 October 2022
19:00 (N)
Scorecard

Zimbabwe; 174/7 (20 overs)	v	Ireland; 143/9 (20 overs)
Sikandar Raza 82 (48); Josh Little 3/24 (4 overs)		Curtis Campher 27 (22); Blessing Muzarabani 3/23 (4 overs)

Zimbabwe won by 31 runs
Bellerive Oval, Hobart
Umpires: Chris Brown (NZ) and Kumar Dharmasena (SL)
Player of the match: Sikandar Raza (Zim)

- Ireland won the toss and elected to field.

19 October 2022
15:00
Scorecard

Scotland; 176/5 (20 overs)	v	Ireland; 180/4 (19 overs)
Michael Jones 86 (55); Curtis Campher 2/9 (2 overs)		Curtis Campher 72* (32); Michael Leask 1/16 (2 overs)

Ireland won by 6 wickets
Bellerive Oval, Hobart
Umpires: Chris Brown (NZ) and Kumar Dharmasena (SL)
Player of the match: Curtis Campher (Ire)

- Scotland won the toss and elected to bat.

21 October 2022
15:00
Scorecard

West Indies; 146/5 (20 overs)	v	Ireland; 150/1 (17.3 overs)
Brandon King 62* (48); Gareth Delany 3/16 (4 overs)		Paul Stirling 66* (48); Akeal Hosein 1/38 (4 overs)

Ireland won by 9 wickets
Bellerive Oval, Hobart
Umpires: Chris Gaffaney (NZ) and Ahsan Raza (Pak)
Player of the match: Gareth Delany (Ire)

- West Indies won the toss and elected to bat.
- Ireland qualified for the Super 12 as a result of this match.

Super 12 (Group 1)

23 October 2022
15:00
Scorecard

Ireland; 128/8 (20 overs)	v	Sri Lanka; 133/1 (15 overs)
Harry Tector 45 (42); Maheesh Theekshana 2/19 (4 overs)		Kusal Mendis 68* (43); Gareth Delany 1/28 (4 overs)

Sri Lanka won by 9 wickets
Bellerive Oval, Hobart
Umpires: Chris Gaffaney (NZ) and Ahsan Raza (Pak)
Player of the match: Kusal Mendis (SL)

- Ireland won the toss and elected to bat.

26 October 2022
15:00
Scorecard

Ireland; 157 (19.2 overs)	v	England; 105/5 (14.3 overs)
Andrew Balbirnie 62 (47); Liam Livingstone 3/17 (3 overs)		Dawid Malan 35 (37); Josh Little 2/16 (3 overs)

Ireland won by 5 runs (DLS method)
Melbourne Cricket Ground, Melbourne
Umpires: Adrian Holdstock (SA) and Paul Reiffel (Aus)
Player of the match: Andrew Balbirnie (Ire)

- England won the toss and elected to field.
- Rain prevented any further play.
- England were 5 runs behind the DLS par score of 110 runs from 14.3 overs.

28 October 2022
15:00
Scorecard

Afghanistan	v	Ireland

Match abandoned
Melbourne Cricket Ground, Melbourne
Umpires: Aleem Dar (Pak) and Adrian Holdstock (SA)

- No toss.
- No play was possible due to rain.

31 October 2022
18:00 (N)
Scorecard

Australia; 179/5 (20 overs)	v	Ireland; 137 (18.1 overs)
Aaron Finch 63 (44); Barry McCarthy 3/29 (4 overs)		Lorcan Tucker 71* (48); Glenn Maxwell 2/14 (2.1 overs)

Australia won by 42 runs
The Gabba, Brisbane
Umpires: Chris Gaffaney (NZ) and Nitin Menon (Ind)
Player of the match: Aaron Finch (Aus)

- Ireland won the toss and elected to field.

4 November 2022
14:30
Scorecard

New Zealand; 185/6 (20 overs)	v	Ireland; 150/9 (20 overs)
Kane Williamson 61 (35); Josh Little 3/22 (4 overs)		Paul Stirling 37 (27); Lockie Ferguson 3/22 (4 overs)

New Zealand won by 35 runs
Adelaide Oval, Adelaide
Umpires: Kumar Dharmasena (SL) and Richard Illingworth (Eng)
Player of the match: Kane Williamson (NZ)

- Ireland won the toss and elected to field.
- Josh Little (Ire) took his first hat-trick in T20Is.
- Ireland were eliminated as a result of this match.

=== 2024 World Cup ===
Squad and kit

- Paul Stirling (c)
- Ross Adair
- Andrew Balbirnie
- Harry Tector
- Neil Rock (wk)
- Lorcan Tucker (wk)
- Curtis Campher
- Gareth Delany
- George Dockrell
- Mark Adair
- Graham Hume
- Josh Little
- Barry McCarthy
- Craig Young
- Ben White

2024 kit

Results

Group stage (Group A)					Super 8		Semifinal	Final	Overall Result
Opposition Result	Opposition Result	Opposition Result	Opposition Result	Rank	Opposition Result	Rank	Opposition Result	Opposition Result	Overall Result
India; Lost by 8 wickets	Canada; Lost by 12 runs	United States; Match abandoned	Pakistan; Lost by 3 wickets	5	Did not advance				Group stage
Source: Cricinfo

Scorecards

Group stage (Group A)

5 June 2024
10:30 UTC−4
Scorecard

Ireland; 96 (16 overs)	v	India; 97/2 (12.2 overs)
Gareth Delany 26 (14); Hardik Pandya 3/27 (4 overs)		Rohit Sharma 52* (37); Ben White 1/6 (1 over)

India won by 8 wickets
Nassau County International Cricket Stadium, East Meadow
Umpires: Chris Gaffaney (NZ) and Alex Wharf (Eng)
Player of the match: Jasprit Bumrah (Ind)

- India won the toss and elected to field.

7 June 2024
10:30 UTC−4
Scorecard

Canada; 137/7 (20 overs)	v	Ireland; 125/7 (20 overs)
Nicholas Kirton 49 (35); Barry McCarthy 2/24 (4 overs)		Mark Adair 34 (24); Jeremy Gordon 2/16 (4 overs)

Canada won by 12 runs
Nassau County International Cricket Stadium, East Meadow
Umpires: Richard Kettleborough (Eng) and Sam Nogajski (Aus)
Player of the match: Nicholas Kirton (Can)

- Ireland won the toss and elected to field.

14 June 2024
10:30 UTC−4
Scorecard

United States	v	Ireland

Match abandoned
Central Broward Park, Lauderhill
Umpires: Sharfuddoula (Ban) and Rod Tucker (Aus)

- No toss.
- No play was possible because of rain.
- Ireland was eliminated as a result of this match.

16 June 2024
10:30 UTC−4
Scorecard

Ireland; 106/9 (20 overs)	v	Pakistan; 111/7 (18.5 overs)
Gareth Delany 31 (19); Imad Wasim 3/8 (4 overs)		Babar Azam 32* (34); Barry McCarthy 3/15 (4 overs)

Pakistan won by 3 wickets
Central Broward Park, Lauderhill
Umpires: Chris Gaffaney (NZ) and Rod Tucker (Aus)
Player of the match: Shaheen Afridi (Pak)

- Pakistan won the toss and elected to field.

=== 2026 World Cup ===
Squad and kit

- Paul Stirling (c)
- Lorcan Tucker (vc, wk)
- Tim Tector
- Matthew Humphreys
- Harry Tector
- Ross Adair
- Mark Adair
- Graham Hume
- Craig Young
- George Dockrell
- Barry McCarthy
- Gareth Delany
- Ben Calitz
- Josh Little
- Curtis Campher
- Ben White

2026 kit

Results

Group stage (Group B)					Super 8		Semifinal	Final	Overall Result
Opposition Result	Opposition Result	Opposition Result	Opposition Result	Rank	Opposition Result	Rank	Opposition Result	Opposition Result	Overall Result
Sri Lanka; Lost by 20 runs	Australia; Lost by 67 runs	Oman; Won by 96 runs	Zimbabwe; Match abandoned	4	Did not advance				Group stage
Source: Cricinfo

Scorecards

Group stage (Group B)

Match 6
8 February 2026
19:00 UTC+5:30 (N)
Scorecard

Sri Lanka; 163/6 (20 overs)	v	Ireland; 143 (19.5 overs)
Kusal Mendis 56* (43); George Dockrell 2/17 (4 overs)		Harry Tector 40 (34); Maheesh Theekshana 3/23 (4 overs)

Sri Lanka won by 20 runs
R. Premadasa Stadium, Colombo
Attendance: 23,429
Umpires: Ahsan Raza (Pak) and Asif Yaqoob (Pak)
Player of the match: Kamindu Mendis (SL)

- Ireland won the toss and elected to field.

Match 14
11 February 2026
15:00 UTC+5:30 (D/N)
Scorecard

Australia; 182/6 (20 overs)	v	Ireland; 115 (16.5 overs)
Marcus Stoinis 45 (29); Mark Adair 2/44 (4 overs)		George Dockrell 41 (29); Nathan Ellis 4/12 (3.5 overs)

Australia won by 67 runs
R. Premadasa Stadium, Colombo
Umpires: Chris Gaffaney (NZ) and Richard Illingworth (Eng)
Player of the match: Nathan Ellis (Aus)

- Australia won the toss and elected to bat.

Match 22
14 February 2026
11:00 UTC+5:30
Scorecard

Ireland; 235/5 (20 overs)	v	Oman; 139 (18 overs)
Lorcan Tucker 94* (51); Shakeel Ahmed 3/33 (4 overs)		Aamir Kaleem 50 (29); Joshua Little 3/16 (4 overs)

Ireland won by 96 runs
Sinhalese Sports Club Cricket Ground, Colombo
Umpires: Richard Kettleborough (Eng) and Raveendra Wimalasiri (SL)
Player of the match: Lorcan Tucker (Ire)

- Oman won the toss and elected to field.
- Aamir Kaleem (Oma) became the oldest player (44 years and 86 days) to score a half-century in a Men's T20 World Cup, surpassing Mohammad Nadeem.
- Oman were eliminated as a result of this match.

Match 32
17 February 2026
15:00 UTC+5:30 (D/N)
Scorecard

Ireland	v	Zimbabwe

Match abandoned
Pallekele International Cricket Stadium, Kandy
Umpires: Ahsan Raza (Pak) and Asif Yaqoob (Pak)

- No toss.
- No play was possible due to rain.
- Zimbabwe qualified for the Super 8 while Australia and Ireland were eliminated as a result of this match.

== See also ==
- Ireland at the Cricket World Cup
- ICC Men's T20 World Cup
