= Indian cricket team in Ireland in 2022 =

International cricket tour

India cricket team in Ireland in 2022
	Ireland	India
- Dates: 26 – 28 June 2022
Captains	Andrew Balbirnie	Hardik Pandya

Twenty20 International series
- Results: India won the 2-match series 2–0
Most runs	Harry Tector (103)	Deepak Hooda (151)
Most wickets	Craig Young (4)	Bhuvneshwar Kumar (2)
- Player of the series: Deepak Hooda (Ind)

The India cricket team toured Ireland in June 2022 to play two Twenty20 International (T20I) matches. On 1 March 2022, Cricket Ireland announced the schedule. On 15 June 2022, Ireland named their squad for the two-match series. Later the same day, India also confirmed their squad for the matches, with Hardik Pandya named as their captain.

The first T20I was delayed by more than two hours due to rain, before the match was reduced to twelve overs per side. Each side fielded a debutant, with Conor Olphert making his international debut for Ireland, and Umran Malik playing his first match for India. Batting first, Ireland made 108/4 from their twelve overs, with Harry Tector making an unbeaten 64 runs. In reply, India chased down the target in 9.2 overs, to win the match by seven wickets.

In the second T20I, India scored 225/7, with Deepak Hooda scoring his first century in a T20I match. In reply, Ireland fell just four runs short of the target, as they made 221/5, with India winning the match and taking the series 2–0. Deepak Hooda was named the player of the series for his century and his 47 not out in the first match. After the match, Ireland's captain Andrew Balbirnie said that "it's not every day you get that close against a team like India", but was "bitterly disappointed" in losing the match by such a narrow margin.

== Squads ==
T20Is
Ireland	India
Andrew Balbirnie (c); Mark Adair; Curtis Campher; Gareth Delany; George Dockrell; Stephen Doheny; Josh Little; Andy McBrine; Barry McCarthy; Conor Olphert; Paul Stirling; Harry Tector; Lorcan Tucker; Craig Young	Hardik Pandya (c); Bhuvneshwar Kumar (vc); Ravi Bishnoi; Yuzvendra Chahal; Ruturaj Gaikwad; Deepak Hooda; Venkatesh Iyer; Dinesh Karthik (wk); Avesh Khan; Ishan Kishan; Umran Malik; Axar Patel; Harshal Patel; Sanju Samson; Arshdeep Singh; Rahul Tripathi; Suryakumar Yadav

== T20I series ==
=== 1st T20I ===
26 June 2022
16:30
Scorecard

Ireland; 108/4 (12 overs)	v	India; 111/3 (9.2 overs)
Harry Tector 64* (33); Yuzvendra Chahal 1/11 (3 overs)		Deepak Hooda 47* (29); Craig Young 2/18 (2 overs)

India won by 7 wickets
Malahide Cricket Ground, Dublin
Umpires: Mark Hawthorne (Ire) and Paul Reynolds (Ire)
Player of the match: Yuzvendra Chahal (Ind)

- India won the toss and elected to field.
- The match was reduced to 12 overs per side due to rain.
- Conor Olphert (Ire) and Umran Malik (Ind) both made their T20I debuts.
- Hardik Pandya captained India for the first time in T20Is.

=== 2nd T20I ===
28 June 2022
16:30
Scorecard

India; 225/7 (20 overs)	v	Ireland; 221/5 (20 overs)
Deepak Hooda 104 (57); Mark Adair 3/42 (4 overs)		Andrew Balbirnie 60 (37); Ravi Bishnoi 1/41 (4 overs)

India won by 4 runs
Malahide Cricket Ground, Dublin
Umpires: Roland Black (Ire) and Jareth McCready (Ire)
Player of the match: Deepak Hooda (Ind)

- India won the toss and elected to bat.
- Deepak Hooda (Ind) scored his first century in T20Is.
- Sanju Samson and Deepak Hooda set a new record for the highest partnership for the second wicket in T20Is and the highest partnership for any wicket for India in T20Is with 176 runs.
