= Mikey O'Reilly =

Irish cricketer

Personal information
- Full name: Michael Brendan O'Reilly
- Born: 2 July 2002 (age 24); Dublin, Leinster, Ireland
- Batting: Right-handed
- Bowling: Left-arm medium

Domestic team information
- Years: Team
- 2023–present: Leinster Lightning

Career statistics
Competition	List A	Twenty20
Matches	5	9
Runs scored	2	2
Batting average	2.00	2.00
100s/50s	–/–	–/–
Top score	1*	1*
Balls bowled	112	114
Wickets	4	3
Bowling average	25.75	58.00
5 wickets in innings	–	–
10 wickets in match	–	–
Best bowling	2/41	1/13
Catches/stumpings	–/–	2/–
- Source: Cricinfo, 23 September 2023

Michael Brendan O'Reilly (born 2 July 2002) is an Irish cricketer.

A member of the YMCA Cricket Club, O'Reilly was assigned by Cricket Ireland to the Munster Reds for 2022 season, but was given permission to move on loan to Leinster Lightning for the remainder of that season following injuries to Peter Chase, David O'Halloran and Barry McCarthy. He made his debut for Leinster Lightning in a List A one-day match against Munster Reds at Dublin in the 2022 Inter-Provincial Cup, with O'Reilly taking the wickets of Murray Commins and Curtis Campher. He made a further one-day appearance in the competition against the same opponents at Cork. In the same season, O'Reilly made his Twenty20 debut in the Inter-Provincial Trophy at Comber, with him making six appearances across the tournament. He was retained by Leinster Lightning for the 2023 season, making three one-day and Twenty20 appearances apiece.
