= Max Burton =

Irish cricketer (born 2001)

Personal information
- Full name: Max Burton
- Born: 13 April 2001 (age 25); Belfast, Northern Ireland
- Batting: Right-handed
- Role: Wicket-keeper

Domestic team information
- Years: Team
- 2022–present: Northern Knights

Career statistics
Competition	List A	Twenty20
Matches	1	3
Runs scored	16	41
Batting average	16.00	13.66
100s/50s	–/–	–/–
Top score	16	22
Catches/stumpings	2/–	2/–
- Source: Cricinfo, 29 May 2022

Max Burton (born 13 April 2001) is an Irish cricketer.

Burton was born at Belfast in April 2001. He was educated at the Belfast Royal Academy, where he played for the academy cricket team. Burton was a member of the North West Warriors squad for the 2019 Inter-Provincial Trophy at Pembroke, but Burton withdrew from the squad. Although he was not named in the core Northern Knights squad for the 2022 season, Burton was added to the Northern Knights squad for their 2022 Inter-Provincial Cup match against the Munster Reds at Belfast following injuries to Neil Rock, John Matchett and Graeme McCarter, coupled with the withdrawal of Luke Georgeson from the Northern Knights squad. Burton subsequently made his List A one-day debut in the match, and later in the season he made his Twenty20 debut against the North West Warriors in the 2022 Inter-Provincial Trophy festival at Comber.
