= 2020 Inter-Provincial Cup =

Cricket tournament

- Dates: 10 – 28 September 2020
- Administrator: Cricket Ireland
- Cricket format: List A
- Tournament format: Round-robin
- Champions: Leinster Lightning (7th title)
- Participants: 3
- Matches: 6
- Most runs: Stephen Doheny (142)
- Most wickets: Simi Singh (10)

The 2020 Inter-Provincial Cup was the eighth edition of the Inter-Provincial Cup, a List A cricket competition that was played in Ireland during September 2020. It was the fourth edition of the competition to be played with List A status. Leinster Lightning were the defending champions.

The first two scheduled matches of the tournament, both between North West Warriors and Northern Knights, were abandoned without a ball being bowled due to the weather. The next match saw Leinster Lightning beat Northern Knights by 91 runs, giving them a bonus point to lead the competition at the mid-way point. In the fourth fixture, Leinster Lightning beat North West Warriors by 62 runs, in a rain-affected match. The win, which included a bonus point, was enough to give Leinster an unassailable lead in the tournament, and their seventh consecutive title. Leinster Lightning went on to win their remaining two matches, finishing the tournament undefeated.

== Background ==
The tournament was originally scheduled to take place from 8 May to 29 July 2020. However, on 26 March 2020, Cricket Ireland confirmed that domestic competitions would be pushed back to 28 May 2020 at the earliest, due to the COVID-19 pandemic. Government restrictions prevented any cricket, including training, from starting before June 2020. The Irish government announced a provisional date of 20 July 2020 for a possible restart of sporting fixtures in the country. Plans of a possible start of domestic cricket in Ireland, with matches taking place during August and September, were looked at in July 2020. On 22 July 2020, Cricket Ireland confirmed the revised fixtures for the tournament. On 15 August 2020, all the teams confirmed their squads for the tournament.

== Points table ==
Team	Pld	W	L	T	NR	Pts
Leinster Lightning	4	4	0	0	0	18
Northern Knights	4	0	2	0	2	4
North West Warriors	4	0	2	0	2	4

== Fixtures ==
10 September 2020
Scorecard

North West Warriors	v	Northern Knights

Match abandoned
Shaw's Bridge, Belfast
Umpires: Mark Hawthorne and Alan Neill

- No toss.
- No play was possible due to rain.
- Points: North West Warriors 2, Northern Knights 2.

15 September 2020
Scorecard

Northern Knights	v	North West Warriors

Match abandoned
Bready Cricket Club Ground, Bready
Umpires: Mark Hawthorne and Roland Black

- No toss.
- No play was possible due to rain.
- Points: Northern Knights 2, North West Warriors 2.

17 September 2020
Scorecard

Leinster Lightning; 306/7 (50 overs)	v	Northern Knights; 215 (42.5 overs)
Stephen Doheny 79 (103); Graeme McCarter 2/53 (10 overs)		Shane Getkate 73 (73); Simi Singh 4/42 (8.5 overs)

Leinster Lightning won by 91 runs
Malahide Cricket Club Ground, Malahide
Umpires: Roland Black and Alan Neill

- Northern Knights won the toss and elected to field.
- Greg Ford (Leinster Lightning) and James Hunter (Northern Knights) both made their List A debuts.
- Points: Leinster Lightning 5, Northern Knights 0.

22 September 2020
Scorecard

North West Warriors; 205/8 (50 overs)	v	Leinster Lightning; 136/1 (26.5 overs)
Graham Kennedy 46 (52); Curtis Campher 4/46 (10 overs)		Jack Tector 76* (80); Andy McBrine 1/24 (4.5 overs)

Leinster Lightning won by 62 runs (DLS method)
Bready Cricket Club Ground, Bready
Umpires: Mark Hawthorne and Roland Black

- Leinster Lightning won the toss and elected to field.
- Rain during Leinster Lightning's innings prevented any further play.
- Varun Chopra (North West Warriors) and Rory Anders (Leinster Lightning) both made their List A debuts.
- Points: Leinster Lightning 5, North West Warriors 0.

26 September 2020
Scorecard

Northern Knights; 240/9 (50 overs)	v	Leinster Lightning; 243/7 (43.1 overs)
James McCollum 60 (77); Josh Little 2/35 (10 overs); George Dockrell 2/35 (10 overs)		Lorcan Tucker 83 (84); Mark Adair 2/46 (9.1 overs)

Leinster Lightning won by 3 wickets
Malahide Cricket Club Ground, Malahide
Umpires: Paul Reynolds and Alan Neill

- Leinster Lightning won the toss and elected to field.
- Carl Robinson (Northern Knights) made his List A debut.
- Points: Leinster Lightning 4, Northern Knights 0.

28 September 2020
Scorecard

North West Warriors; 132/8 (32 overs)	v	Leinster Lightning; 133/7 (26.2 overs)
Stuart Thompson 36 (39); Simi Singh 3/27 (7 overs)		Curtis Campher 59* (67); Craig Young 2/30 (4 overs)

Leinster Lightning won by 3 wickets (DLS method)
Malahide Cricket Club Ground, Malahide
Umpires: Mark Hawthorne and Paul Reynolds

- North West Warriors won the toss and elected to bat.
- The match was reduced to 32 overs per side due to rain.
- Conor Olphert (North West Warriors) made his List A debut.
- Points: Leinster Lightning 4, North West Warriors 0.
