= Mitchell Thompson =

Irish cricketer

Personal information
- Full name: Mitchell Robert Thompson
- Born: 12 November 2001 (age 25); Dublin, Ireland
- Batting: Right-handed
- Bowling: Right-arm leg break

Domestic team information
- Years: Team
- 2021: Munster Reds
- 2022: Leinster Lightning

Career statistics
Competition	LA	T20
Matches	2	3
Runs scored	–	14
Batting average	–	14.00
100s/50s	–/–	0/0
Top score	–	12*
Balls bowled	36	30
Wickets	0	1
Bowling average	–	48.00
5 wickets in innings	–	0
10 wickets in match	–	0
Best bowling	–	1/16
Catches/stumpings	0/–	0/–
- Source: Cricinfo, 5 June 2022

Mitchell Robert Thompson (born 12 November 2001) is an Irish cricketer. In June 2019, Thompson was selected to play for the Ireland under-19 cricket team in the 2020 Under-19 Cricket World Cup qualification tournament. In Ireland's final match, against France, Thompson took a five-wicket haul, finishing with figures of 5/17 from 9.4 overs. He finished as the leading wicket-taker for Ireland, with thirteen dismissals.

In February 2021, Thompson was named as one of the players to join the Cricket Ireland Academy ahead of the 2021 season. Thompson, who had previously played cricket in Australia and South Africa, made his Twenty20 debut on 20 June 2021, for Munster Reds in the 2021 Inter-Provincial Trophy. He made his List A debut on 30 June 2021, for Munster Reds in the 2021 Inter-Provincial Cup.
