= Trent McKeegan =

Irish cricketer

Personal information
- Full name: Trent Cecil Alan McKeegan
- Born: 11 March 2000 (age 26); Derry, Northern Ireland
- Batting: Right-handed
- Bowling: Right-arm medium-fast

Domestic team information
- Years: Team
- 2022–present: North West Warriors

Career statistics
Competition	List A	Twenty20
Matches	2	8
Runs scored	15	0
Batting average	15.00	0.00
100s/50s	–/–	–/–
Top score	15	0
Balls bowled	145	119
Wickets	0	11
Bowling average	–	14.54
5 wickets in innings	–	–
10 wickets in match	–	–
Best bowling	–	4/24
Catches/stumpings	–/–	1/–
- Source: Cricinfo, 23 September 2023

Trent McKeegan (born 11 March 2000) is an Irish cricketer.

A member of Newbuildings Cricket Club, McKeegan played age group cricket for the North West Cricket Union in 2017. In 2020, he raised £5,000 for Altnagelvin Hospital in Derry in memory of his grandfather, Alan Wallace, who was an umpire in the North-West of Ireland, by running 75 miles in three days. McKeegan is employed by the Pharmacy Department at the hospital. McKeegan was called up to the North West Warriors squad for their opening matches in the 2022 Inter-Provincial Cup, but did not feature in the starting eleven. His debut for the North West Warriors came in a Twenty20 match against the Northern Knights in the 2022 Inter-Provincial Trophy festival at Comber, with McKeegan taking the wicket of Max Burton in the match. He played in all three of the Warriors fixtures in the festival, but went wicketless in his next two matches.
