= Cormac McLoughlin-Gavin =

Irish cricketer (born 1994)

Personal information
- Full name: Cormac McLoughlin-Gavin
- Born: 30 April 1994 (age 32)
- Batting: Right handed
- Bowling: Right arm offbreak
- Source: Cricinfo, 18 June 2019

Cormac McLoughlin-Gavin (born 30 April 1994) is an Irish cricketer. He made his first-class debut for Leinster Lightning in the 2019 Inter-Provincial Championship on 18 June 2019. He made his Twenty20 debut for Munster Reds in the 2020 Inter-Provincial Trophy on 20 August 2020. He made his List A debut on 6 May 2021, for Munster Reds in the 2021 Inter-Provincial Cup.
