= Greg Ford (cricketer) =

Irish cricketer (born 1992)

Personal information
- Born: 9 May 1992 (age 34); Pietermaritzburg, Natal, South Africa
- Batting: Right-handed
- Bowling: Right-arm leg break
- Relatives: Graham Ford (father); Matt Ford (brother)

Domestic team information
- Years: Team
- 2020, 2022: Leinster Lightning
- 2021: Munster Reds

Career statistics
Competition	List A	Twenty20
Matches	11	12
Runs scored	88	122
Batting average	12.57	30.50
100s/50s	0/0	0/0
Top score	43	26
Catches/stumpings	3/–	3/–
- Source: Cricinfo, 5 June 2022

Greg Ford (born 9 May 1992) is an Irish cricketer, and the son of Graham Ford, the head coach of the Ireland cricket team. He made his List A debut on 17 September 2020, for Leinster Lightning in the 2020 Inter-Provincial Cup. He made his Twenty20 debut on 27 August 2020, for Leinster Lightning in the 2020 Inter-Provincial Trophy. Ford captains Balbriggan Cricket Club in north Dublin. Leading the team to promotion from the Championship in 2021, to winning the Premier league in 2022. This was the first time Balbriggan CC played in Ireland's top league. Ford's brother, Matt, also plays cricket for Munster Reds.
