= Aaron Cawley =

Irish cricketer (born 1999)

Personal information
- Full name: Aaron Cawley
- Born: 15 October 1999 (age 27); Horse and Jockey, Munster, Ireland
- Batting: Right-handed
- Bowling: Right-arm fast-medium
- Role: Bowler

Domestic team information
- Years: Team
- 2017–2021: Munster Reds
- List A debut: 6 May 2021 Munster Reds v North West Warriors
- Twenty20 debut: 26 May 2017 Munster Reds v Northern Knights

Career statistics
Competition	List A	Twenty20
Matches	5	12
Runs scored	3	42
Batting average	3.00	14.00
100s/50s	–/–	–/–
Top score	3	19
Balls bowled	222	198
Wickets	7	8
Bowling average	30.42	34.12
5 wickets in innings	–	–
10 wickets in match	–	–
Best bowling	3/60	2/15
Catches/stumpings	1/–	3/–
- Source: Cricinfo, 2 February 2022

Aaron Cawley (born 15 October 1999) is an Irish cricketer. He made his Twenty20 cricket debut for Munster Reds in the 2017 Inter-Provincial Trophy on 26 May 2017.

In December 2017, he was named in Ireland's squad for the 2018 Under-19 Cricket World Cup. In February 2021, Cawley was part of the intake for the Cricket Ireland Academy. He made his List A debut on 6 May 2021, for Munster Reds in the 2021 Inter-Provincial Cup.
