= Olpherts =

Olpherts or Olphert is a surname. Notable people with the surname include:

- David Olphert (born 1969), Irish cricketer
- Derrell Olpherts (born 1992), English rugby player
- William Olpherts (1832–1902), British Indian Army officer, recipient of the Victoria Cross

== See also ==
- Olphert Stanfield (1869–1952), Irish footballer
