= James Hunter (cricketer) =

Irish cricketer (born 2002)

Personal information
- Born: 1 November 2002 (age 24)
- Source: Cricinfo, 17 September 2020

James Hunter (born 1 November 2002) is an Irish cricketer. He made his List A debut for the Northern Knights in the 2020 Inter-Provincial Cup on 17 September 2020. Prior to his List A debut, Hunter played for the Ireland under-19 cricket team.
