= David O'Halloran (cricketer) =

Irish cricketer (born 2000)

Personal information
- Full name: David Joseph O'Halloran
- Born: 27 October 2000 (age 26); Dublin, Leinster, Ireland
- Batting: Right-handed
- Bowling: Right-arm medium-fast

Domestic team information
- Years: Team
- 2021: Leinster Lightning

Career statistics
Competition	List A
Matches	6
Runs scored	2
Batting average	–
100s/50s	0/0
Top score	2*
Balls bowled	233
Wickets	8
Bowling average	19.75
5 wickets in innings	0
10 wickets in match	0
Best bowling	4/44
Catches/stumpings	0/–
- Source: Cricinfo, 24 May 2021

David Joseph O'Halloran (born 27 October 2000) is an Irish cricketer. In February 2021, O'Halloran was named as part of the new intake for the Cricket Ireland Academy ahead of the 2021 season. He made his List A debut on 1 May 2021, for Leinster Lightning in the 2021 Inter-Provincial Cup. Later the same month, he was named as one of four additional players for Ireland's One Day International (ODI) series against the Netherlands. He made his Twenty20 debut on 18 June 2021, for Leinster Lightning in the 2021 Inter-Provincial Trophy.
