= Aniruddha Chore =

Indian cricketer

Personal information
- Full name: Aniruddha Purushottam Chore
- Born: 10 October 1991 (age 35); Nagpur, Maharashtra, India
- Batting: Right-handed
- Role: Wicket-keeper

Domestic team information
- Years: Team
- 2011/12–2014/15: Vidarbha
- 2022: Northern Knights

Career statistics
Competition	First-class	List A
Matches	10	5
Runs scored	296	152
Batting average	19.73	38.00
100s/50s	1/0	0/1
Top score	157	65
Catches/stumpings	19/3	1/0
- Source: ESPNcricinfo, 3 June 2022

Aniruddha Chore (born 10 October 1991) is an Indian cricketer who plays as a wicket-keeper. After playing for Vidarbha from 2011/12 to 2014/15 in India, Chore went on to play for Northern Knights for the 2022 season in Ireland.

== Career ==
In October 2011, Chore scored an unbeaten 253 runs in the Col C K Nayudu Trophy, the highest individual score for Vidarbha at any level. Chore made his first-class debut on 3 November 2011, for Vidarbha in the 2011–12 Ranji Trophy. Later the same month, in his third first-class match, Chore scored his maiden century, with 157 runs against Services. After playing in ten first-class matches, Chore moved to Oman in 2018 for more opportunities. Chore went to Oman with two other cricketers, with the aim to play for the national team within three years, and to play in ICC tournaments. In 2020, Chore was named the best player in the Oman One-Day Premier League.

In January 2021, Chore signed for North Down Cricket Club in Northern Ireland. Prior to moving to Northern Ireland, Chore had played for the Oman A cricket team. In July 2021, Chore scored 121 not out for North Down against Lisburn Cricket Club. By August 2021, Chore had scored 478 runs without being dismissed, leading him to gain comparisons to Don Bradman, and being called the "signing of the season".

In February 2022, Chore was named the Club Male Player of the Year at the ITW Irish Cricket Awards. On 12 May 2022, Chore played in first List A match for Northern Knights, where he top-scored for the team in the fixture against North West Warriors in the fourth match of the 2022 Inter-Provincial Cup.
