= Nathan McGuire =

Irish cricketer (born 2003)

Personal information
- Full name: Nathan Jack McGuire
- Born: 25 February 2003 (age 23); Rush, County Dublin, Ireland
- Bowling: Right-arm off spin
- Role: Batsman

Domestic team information
- Years: Team
- 2020–2023: North West Warriors
- LA debut: 7 June 2019 Ireland A v Scotland A
- T20 debut: 9 June 2019 Ireland A v Scotland A

Career statistics
Competition	List A	Twenty20
Matches	9	15
Runs scored	169	149
Batting average	24.14	10.64
100s/50s	0/1	0/0
Top score	53*	34
Balls bowled	12	20
Wickets	0	0
Bowling average	–	–
5 wickets in innings	–	–
10 wickets in match	–	–
Best bowling	–	–
Catches/stumpings	2/–	6/–
- Source: Cricinfo, 4 May 2022

Nathan McGuire (born 25 February 2003) is an Irish cricketer. In June 2019, he was added to the Ireland Wolves' squad for their series against Scotland A in Ireland. He made his List A debut for the Ireland Wolves against Scotland A on 7 June 2019. He made his Twenty20 debut for the Ireland Wolves against Scotland A on 9 June 2019.

In February 2021, McGuire was part of the intake for the Cricket Ireland Academy. In December 2021, he was named in Ireland's team for the 2022 ICC Under-19 Cricket World Cup in the West Indies.
