= Amish Sidhu =

Indian cricketer (born 1996)

Personal information
- Born: 5 October 1996 (age 30); Jaitu, Punjab, India
- Source: ESPNcricinfo, 27 June 2021

Amish Sidhu (born 15 October 1996) is an Indian cricketer who plays domestic cricket in Ireland for Phoenix. He made his List A debut on 6 May 2021, for Munster Reds in the 2021 Inter-Provincial Cup.
