= Theo Lawson =

Irish cricketer (born 1988)

Personal information
- Full name: Theophilus Samuel Lawson
- Born: 24 September 1988 (age 37)
- Source: Cricinfo, 19 September 2021

Theo Lawson (born 24 September 1988) is an Irish cricketer. In September 2021, he was named in Leinster Lightning's squad for the final round of matches in the 2021 Inter-Provincial Trophy. On 19 September 2021, he made his Twenty20 debut for Leinster Lightning, on the last day of the tournament. Prior to his Twenty20 debut, Lawson was part of Ireland's squad for the 2008 Under-19 Cricket World Cup.
