= Alistair Frost =

Zimbabwean cricketer (born 1999)

Personal information
- Full name: Alistair Ryan Frost
- Born: 24 April 1999 (age 27); Harare, Zimbabwe
- Batting: Right-handed
- Bowling: Right-arm medium-fast
- Role: Bowler

Domestic team information
- Years: Team
- 2021–2024: Munster Reds
- 2022/23–2023/24: Southern Rocks
- 2024/25–2025/26: Mountaineers

Career statistics
Competition	FC	LA	T20
Matches	21	26	33
Runs scored	1,139	632	495
Batting average	35.59	31.60	24.75
100s/50s	1/6	0/5	0/3
Top score	209*	64	83
Balls bowled	380	265	174
Wickets	5	7	9
Bowling average	52.40	35.71	27.11
5 wickets in innings	0	0	0
10 wickets in match	0	0	0
Best bowling	3/26	2/20	2/15
Catches/stumpings	7/–	10/–	8/–
- Source: Cricinfo, 5 April 2026

Alistair Ryan Frost (born 24 April 1999) is a Zimbabwean cricketer. In November 2017, Frost was named to Zimbabwe's squad for the 2018 Under-19 Cricket World Cup. After the tournament he moved to Ireland, where he made his Twenty20 debut on 25 June 2021, for Munster Reds in the 2021 Inter-Provincial Trophy. He made his List A debut on 30 June 2021, for Munster Reds in the 2021 Inter-Provincial Cup. He was named in an Ireland Academy squads to play England U-19s and the Free Foresters. He made his first-class debut on 10 February 2023, for Southern Rocks in the 2022–23 Logan Cup.
