= Michael Frost (cricketer) =

Zimbabwean cricketer (born 2001)

Mike Frost
Personal information
- Full name: Michael Frost
- Born: 29 May 2001 (age 25)
- Batting: Right-handed
- Bowling: Slow left-arm orthodox
- Role: Bowler

Domestic team information
- Years: Team
- 2021–2025: Munster Reds
- 2024/25–2025/26: Mountaineers

Career statistics
Competition	FC	LA	T20
Matches	6	30	31
Runs scored	128	176	21
Batting average	21.33	19.55	7.00
100s/50s	0/1	0/0	0/0
Top score	70	45*	8
Balls bowled	1,063	1,367	535
Wickets	22	47	19
Bowling average	29.77	22.21	36.15
5 wickets in innings	0	2	0
10 wickets in match	0	0	0
Best bowling	4/89	6/12	3/20
Catches/stumpings	3/–	12/–	10/–
- Source: Cricinfo, 5 April 2026

Michael Frost (born 29 May 2001) is a Zimbabwean cricketer who holds an Irish passport. In February 2020, he was added to the Ireland Wolves team for their tour to Namibia. He made his List A debut on 27 February 2020, for Ireland Wolves against Namibia, during their tour to South Africa. In June 2021, Frost was selected to play for Munster Reds in the 2021 Inter-Provincial Trophy. He made his Twenty20 debut on 18 June 2021, for Munster Reds in the 2021 Inter-Provincial Trophy.

In May 2022, in the 2022 Inter-Provincial Cup, Frost took his first five-wicket haul in List A cricket, with 5/42 against North West Warriors.
