= Seamus Lynch (cricketer) =

Irish cricketer

Personal information
- Full name: Seamus M. Lynch
- Born: August 10, 2002 (age 24); Dublin, Leinster, Ireland
- Batting: Right-handed
- Role: Batter

Domestic team information
- Years: Team
- 2021: Munster Reds
- 2022–: Leinster Lightning

Career statistics
Competition	List A	Twenty20
Matches	15	32
Runs scored	286	200
Batting average	28.60	12.50
100s/50s	1/0	0/0
Top score	107	28*
Catches/stumpings	13/1	8/1
- Source: Cricinfo, 1 August 2026

Seamus M. Lynch (born 10 August 2002) is an Irish cricketer.

He has played for Munster Reds and Leinster Lightning in Irish inter-provincial cricket, as well as representing Ireland U-17s

== Domestic career ==
Born in Dublin, Lynch is a product of Terenure Cricket Club.

He was called up to the Ireland Under-17 team in 2018 and was added to the Cricket Ireland Academy.

In the restructuring of Irish domestic cricket prior to the 2021 season, Lynch was assigned to the Cork based Munster Reds squad. He made his debut for the Reds in a List A one-day match against North West Warriors at Eglinton, with his Twenty20 debut coming later in the season against Leinster Lightning at Dublin in the first Interprovincial T20 festival of the season.

He moved to Leinster Lightning for the 2022 season but played only a single T20 match.

In June 2023, Lynch was recalled to the Leinster Lightning squad as cover for a number of absentees. In a match against Northern Knights on 5 September, Lynch struck a maiden List A century as he smashed 107 off of just 63 balls.
