= David Olphert =

Irish cricketer

Personal information
- Full name: David Mark Olphert
- Born: 10 January 1969 (age 57); Derry, Northern Ireland
- Batting: Right-handed
- Bowling: Left-arm medium
- Relatives: Conor Olphert (son)

Domestic team information
- Years: Team
- 1998: Ireland

Career statistics
Competition	First-class
Matches	1
Runs scored	1
Batting average	0.50
100s/50s	0/0
Top score	0
Balls bowled	24
Wickets	0
Bowling average	–
5 wickets in innings	–
10 wickets in match	–
Best bowling	–
Catches/stumpings	0/–
- Source: Cricinfo, 21 October 2018

David Mark Olphert (born 10 January 1969) is a former Irish first-class cricketer.

Olphert was born at Derry and was educated at Strabane High School. A useful batting all-rounder at club level, he played one first-class cricket match for Ireland against Australia A at Dublin in 1998. In a heavy Irish defeat, Olphert bowled four overs for 28 runs, without taking a wicket in the Australian's first-innings; batting twice in the match, he was dismissed in Ireland's first-innings without scoring by Adam Dale, while in their second-innings he was dismissed by Brendon Julian after making a single run. He was not selected again for Ireland after this match. Outside of cricket, he works as a plumber.
