= Varun Chopra (Irish cricketer) =

Irish cricketer (born 2000)

Personal information
- Full name: Varun C Chopra
- Born: 1 February 2000 (age 26); Ireland
- Source: Cricinfo, 7 July 2018

Varun Chopra (born 1 February 2000) is an Irish cricketer. He made his Twenty20 debut for North West Warriors in the 2018 Inter-Provincial Trophy on 7 July 2018. Prior to his Twenty20 debut, he was part of Ireland's squads for the 2016 Under-19 Cricket World Cup and the 2018 Under-19 Cricket World Cup. He made his List A debut for North West Warriors in the 2020 Inter-Provincial Cup on 22 September 2020.
