= Matt Ford (cricketer) =

Irish cricketer (born 1994)

Personal information
- Full name: Mathew Ford
- Born: 10 April 1994 (age 32); Pietermaritzburg, Natal, South Africa
- Batting: Right-handed
- Bowling: Right-arm leg break
- Role: Batting all-round
- Relatives: Graham Ford (father); Greg Ford (brother)

Domestic team information
- Years: Team
- 2019: Leinster Lightning
- 2021–2022: Munster Reds

Career statistics
Competition	List A	Twenty20
Matches	9	15
Runs scored	208	280
Batting average	69.33	40.00
100s/50s	0/2	0/2
Top score	71*	63*
Balls bowled	126	114
Wickets	1	7
Bowling average	122.00	16.42
5 wickets in innings	0	0
10 wickets in match	0	0
Best bowling	1/15	2/10
Catches/stumpings	4/–	4/–
- Source: Cricinfo, 5 June 2022

Mathew Ford (born 10 April 1994) is an Irish cricketer, and the son of Graham Ford, the former head coach of the Ireland cricket team. He made his List A debut on 20 May 2021, for Munster Reds in the 2021 Inter-Provincial Cup. He made his Twenty20 debut on 21 June 2019, for Leinster Lightning against Middlesex. Ford's brother, Greg, also plays cricket for Munster Reds.

Ford was the leading run-scorer in the 2021 Inter-Provincial Trophy, with 220 runs in eight matches.
