= Ben White (cricketer) =

Irish cricketer

Personal information
- Full name: Benjamin Charlie White
- Born: 29 August 1998 (age 28); Dublin, Ireland
- Batting: Right-handed
- Bowling: Right-arm leg break

International information
- National side: Ireland (2021–2025)
- Test debut (cap 24): 4 April 2023 v Bangladesh
- Last Test: 24 April 2023 v Sri Lanka
- ODI debut (cap 67): 19 June 2023 v Oman
- Last ODI: 21 June 2023 v Scotland
- T20I debut (cap 49): 24 July 2021 v South Africa
- Last T20I: 2 December 2025 v Bangladesh

Domestic team information
- Years: Team
- 2021–2022: Northern Knights
- 2023–2025: Munster Reds
- 2026: Leinster Lightning

Career statistics
Competition	Test	ODI	T20I	FC
Matches	3	2	38	3
Runs scored	1	–	27	1
Batting average	0.50	–	13.50	0.50
100s/50s	0/0	–/–	0/0	0/0
Top score	1	–	7*	1
Balls bowled	459	108	720	459
Wickets	4	1	36	4
Bowling average	109.00	118.00	27.38	109.00
5 wickets in innings	0	0	0	0
10 wickets in match	0	0	0	0
Best bowling	2/71	1/59	4/20	2/71
Catches/stumpings	0/–	0/–	6/–	0/–
- Source: Cricinfo, 7 December 2025

Benjamin Charlie White (born 29 August 1998) is a former Irish cricketer. In January 2016, White was named as part of Ireland's squad for the 2016 Under-19 Cricket World Cup. White made his international debut for the Ireland cricket team in July 2021.

== Biography ==
In February 2021, White was named in the Ireland Wolves' squad for their tour to Bangladesh. It was his first call-up to the squad, with White saying that he was "over the moon" to get selected for the tour. Later the same month, White was also part of the intake for the Cricket Ireland Academy. White made his List A debut on 5 March 2021, for Ireland Wolves against the Bangladesh Emerging team. However, the match was abandoned after 30 overs when Ruhan Pretorius tested positive for COVID-19. On 16 March 2021, White also made his Twenty20 during the tour of Bangladesh, in the one-off Unofficial T20I match at the end of the series. Following the tour of Bangladesh, White was awarded with a retainer contract, after he impressed the selectors.

In May 2021, White was selected for the Ireland Wolves squad for three List A matches in Ireland against Netherlands A. Later the same month, White was added to Ireland's One Day International (ODI) squad for their away series against the Netherlands. In June 2021, during the 2021 Inter-Provincial Trophy, White took his first five-wicket haul in T20 cricket.

In June 2021, White was named in Ireland's Twenty20 International (T20I) squad for their series against South Africa. White made his T20I debut on 24 July 2021, for Ireland against South Africa. In September 2021, White was named in Ireland's provisional squad for the 2021 ICC Men's T20 World Cup. White was also the leading wicket-taker in the 2021 Inter-Provincial Trophy, with seventeen dismissals in seven matches.

In November 2021, White was named in Ireland's One Day International (ODI) squads for their tours to United States and the West Indies. Despite having not played first-class cricket, White was named in Ireland's Test squad for their tours of Bangladesh in March 2023 and Sri Lanka in April 2023. He was also named in the T20I and ODI squads for the tours. He made his Test debut against Bangladesh, on 4 April 2023. He made his ODI debut against Nepal in 2023 Cricket World Cup Qualifier, on 19 June 2023.

In May 2024, he was named in Ireland's squad for the 2024 ICC Men's T20 World Cup tournament.
