= John Matchett =

Irish cricketer (born 1997)

Personal information
- Full name: John Matchett
- Born: 22 July 1997 (age 29); Belfast, Northern Ireland

Domestic team information
- Years: Team
- 2017–present: Northern Knights
- First-class debut: 5 June 2017 Northern v Leinster
- Only Twenty20: 11 August 2017 Northern v North West

Career statistics
Competition	FC	T20
Matches	3	1
Runs scored	51	18
Batting average	8.50	18.00
100s/50s	0/0	0/0
Top score	27	18
Balls bowled	12	12
Wickets	0	0
Bowling average	–	–
5 wickets in innings	–	–
10 wickets in match	–	n/a
Best bowling	–	–
Catches/stumpings	3/–	0/–
- Source: Cricinfo, 15 July 2018

John Matchett (born 22 July 1997) is an Irish cricketer. He made his first-class debut for Northern Knights in the 2017 Inter-Provincial Championship on 5 June 2017. He made his Twenty20 debut for Northern Knights in the 2017 Inter-Provincial Trophy on 11 August 2017. He made his List A debut on 18 May 2021, for Northern Knights in the 2021 Inter-Provincial Cup.
