= Conor Olphert =

Irish cricketer (born 1995)

Personal information
- Born: 28 December 1995 (age 30); Derry, Northern Ireland
- Batting: Right-handed
- Bowling: Right-arm medium
- Role: Bowler
- Relatives: David Olphert (father)

International information
- National side: Ireland
- T20I debut (cap 53): 26 June 2022 v India
- Last T20I: 28 June 2022 v India

Domestic team information
- Years: Team
- 2020–2022: North West Warriors

Career statistics
Competition	T20I	LA	T20
Matches	2	6	8
Runs scored	–	10	8
Batting average	–	10.00	8.00
100s/50s	–/–	0/0	0/0
Top score	–	7	8
Balls bowled	30	267	168
Wickets	0	9	11
Bowling average	–	26.77	21.18
5 wickets in innings	–	0	0
10 wickets in match	–	0	0
Best bowling	–	3/83	3/27
Catches/stumpings	0/–	1/–	1/–
- Source: Cricinfo, 15 July 2022

Conor Olphert (born 28 December 1995) is an Irish cricketer from Northern Ireland. He made his List A debut on 28 September 2020, for North West Warriors in the 2020 Inter-Provincial Cup. On 11 January 2021, Olphert was added to Ireland's squad as a net bowler for their matches against the United Arab Emirates and Afghanistan. In February 2021, Olphert was part of the intake for the Cricket Ireland Academy. He made his Twenty20 debut on 18 September 2021, for North West Warriors in the 2021 Inter-Provincial Trophy. In May 2022, Cricket Ireland awarded Olphert a nine-month contract.

== International career ==
In June 2022, Olphert was named in Ireland's Twenty20 International (T20I) squad for their two-match series against India. He made his T20I debut on 26 June 2022, for Ireland against India. In May 2023, Olphert was named in Ireland's Test squads for their tour of England in June 2023.
