= Ryan MacBeth (cricketer) =

Irish cricketer (born 1997)

Personal information
- Full name: Ryan MacBeth
- Born: 15 November 1997 (age 28); Letterkenny, Ireland
- Batting: Right-handed
- Bowling: Right-arm medium

Domestic team information
- Years: Team
- 2018–present: North West Warriors
- First-class debut: 30 August 2017; North West v Leinster
- List A debut: 16 July 2018; North West v Northern

Career statistics
| Competition | FC | LA | T20 |
|---|---|---|---|
| Matches | 2 | 5 | 8 |
| Runs scored | 14 | 34 | 0 |
| Batting average | 14.00 | 17.00 | 0.00 |
| 100s/50s | 0/0 | 0/0 | 0/0 |
| Top score | 14 | 29* | 0 |
| Balls bowled | 66 | 144 | 144 |
| Wickets | 1 | 6 | 6 |
| Bowling average | 26.00 | 12.50 | 28.33 |
| 5 wickets in innings | 0 | 0 | 0 |
| 10 wickets in match | 0 | 0 | 0 |
| Best bowling | 1/24 | 3/29 | 2/18 |
| Catches/stumpings | 0/– | 0/– | 1/– |
- Source: Cricinfo, 5 June 2022

Ryan MacBeth (born 15 November 1997) is an Irish cricketer. He made his first-class debut for North West Warriors in the 2017 Inter-Provincial Championship on 30 August 2017. He made his List A debut for North West Warriors in the 2018 Inter-Provincial Cup on 16 July 2018. He made his Twenty20 debut on 25 June 2021, for North West Warriors in the 2021 Inter-Provincial Trophy.
