= Barry McCarthy =

Irish cricketer (born 1992)

Personal information
- Full name: Barry John McCarthy
- Born: 13 September 1992 (age 34); Dublin, Ireland
- Batting: Right-handed
- Bowling: Right-arm fast-medium
- Role: Bowler
- Relatives: Louise McCarthy (sister)

International information
- National side: Ireland (2016–present)
- Test debut (cap 27): 28 February 2024 v Afghanistan
- Last Test: 11 November 2025 v Bangladesh
- ODI debut (cap 49): 16 June 2016 v Sri Lanka
- Last ODI: 25 May 2025 v West Indies
- T20I debut (cap 41): 10 March 2017 v Afghanistan
- Last T20I: 14 February 2026 v Oman

Domestic team information
- Years: Team
- 2016–2018: Durham (squad no. 60)
- 2019–present: Leinster Lightning

Career statistics
Competition	Test	ODI	T20I	FC
Matches	4	48	69	28
Runs scored	73	220	301	603
Batting average	12.16	9.16	12.04	18.84
100s/50s	0/0	0/0	0/1	0/1
Top score	31	41	51*	51*
Balls bowled	645	2,405	1,481	4,191
Wickets	16	81	73	86
Bowling average	20.00	29.20	29.28	28.56
5 wickets in innings	0	1	0	3
10 wickets in match	0	0	0	0
Best bowling	4/75	5/46	4/30	6/63
Catches/stumpings	1/–	15/–	17/–	11/–
- Source: Cricinfo, 19 February 2026

Barry John McCarthy (born 13 September 1992) is an Irish cricketer. He made his first-class debut in 2015, and plays for the Ireland cricket team, and previously the English side Durham. Primarily a right-arm medium pace bowler, he also bats right handed.

In January 2020, he was one of nineteen players to be awarded a central contract from Cricket Ireland, the first year in which all contracts were awarded on a full-time basis.

His sister, Louise McCarthy is an international cricketer for Ireland Women.

== Career ==
He made his Twenty20 debut on 20 May 2016 for Durham against Worcestershire Rapids in the 2016 NatWest t20 Blast.

In June 2016 he was named in Ireland's squad for their One Day International (ODI) series against Sri Lanka, having previously represented Ireland U19s in five matches. He made his ODI debut for Ireland on 16 June 2016. He made his Twenty20 International (T20I) debut for Ireland against Afghanistan on 10 March 2017 and took 4 wickets. However, his performance in only his 2nd T20I with bowling figures were the most expensive bowling figures in a T20I.

Following the conclusion of the 2018 Cricket World Cup Qualifier tournament, the International Cricket Council (ICC) named McCarthy as the rising star of Ireland's squad. In November 2018, McCarthy left Durham to focus on his international career with Ireland. In December 2018, he was one of nineteen players to be awarded a central contract by Cricket Ireland for the 2019 season.

In January 2019, he was named in Ireland's squad for their one-off Test against Afghanistan in India, but he did not play. In May 2019, in the opening match of the 2019 Ireland Tri-Nation Series against the West Indies, McCarthy took his 50th wicket in ODI cricket.

In October 2019, he was added to Ireland's squad ahead of the playoff matches in the 2019 ICC T20 World Cup Qualifier tournament in the United Arab Emirates, replacing David Delany, who was ruled out due to an injury. On 10 July 2020, McCarthy was named in Ireland's 21-man squad to travel to England to start training behind closed doors for the ODI series against the England cricket team. In September 2021, McCarthy was named in Ireland's provisional squad for the 2021 ICC Men's T20 World Cup. McCarthy was named in Ireland's Test squad for their tours of Bangladesh in March 2023 and Sri Lanka in April 2023. He was also named in the T20I and ODI squads for the Bangladesh tour.

In 2023 McCarthy registered his maiden T20I half-century with a score of 51* off 33 balls against India in a rain-affected T20I encounter at Malahide.

He would make his Test debut in Ireland's historic maiden Test victory against Afghanistan in February 2024. Hashmatullah Shahidi was his first Test victim, caught behind by Lorcan Tucker. He went on to take four wickets in the match as Ireland won by 6 wickets.

In the first match of the 2024 Interprovincial Trophy season McCarthy set a new record for best bowling in the competition with figures of 5/3 for Leinster Lightning against Munster Reds, also breaking his career best bowling figures. In May 2024, he was named in Ireland's squad for the 2024 ICC Men's T20 World Cup tournament.
