= Paul Reynolds (umpire) =

English cricket umpire (1973–2023)

Personal information
- Born: 23 May 1973; Crawley, West Sussex, England
- Died: 17 October 2023 (aged 50)

Umpiring information
- ODIs umpired: 8 (2018–2023)
- T20Is umpired: 12 (2018–2023)
- WODIs umpired: 5 (2016–2023)
- WT20Is umpired: 13 (2016–2022)
- Source: Cricinfo, 12 May 2023

Paul Reynolds (23 May 1973 – 17 October 2023) was an English cricket umpire representing Ireland. In November 2016, he was named the Official of the Year at the Cricket Ireland Awards. In June 2018, he was appointed to the International Panel of Umpires and Referees.

Reynolds stood in his first Twenty20 International (T20I), between Ireland and Afghanistan, on 22 August 2018. His One Day International (ODI) umpiring debut match was also between Ireland and Afghanistan, on 29 August 2018.

In April 2019, he was one of four umpires to be awarded a full-time season contract by Cricket Ireland, the first time that Cricket Ireland had offered such contracts to umpires.

== Death ==
Reynolds died on 17 October 2023, at the age of 50 following prolonged illness.

== See also ==
- List of One Day International cricket umpires
- List of Twenty20 International cricket umpires
