= Cricket Ireland Academy =

The Shapoorji Pallonji National Academy or National Cricket Academy is a cricket academy and training centre based at the Malahide Cricket Club Ground in Malahide, Dublin, Ireland. The centre was sponsored by the Shapoorji Pallonji Group.

The NCA was officially opened in 2013 with 10 years deal with Indian business conglomerate Shapoorji Pallonji Group which is owned by the Pallonji Mistry family who Irish citizens to promote cricket in Ireland. It was designed to be a finishing school for leading young male and female players who are identified as having the potential to represent the Ireland cricket team. The initial intake comprised 22 Irish players from the ages of 15 upwards. Peter Johnston took over the Cricket Ireland Academy in 2016 as Academy and Performance Manager, taking over from Craig Hogan who had successfully started the program.

The Academy expanded to having an Emerging and Senior Men's Academy along with a Women's Academy. It ran a comprehensive holistic training program with a comprehensive playing program and the establishment of the Ireland Wolves cricket team which initially was strongly linked to Academy players. The covid pandemic saw the Academy go online for two Winters and following that it failed to return in its previous form due to lack funding, while it did manage to continue a playing program up until and including 2024.

Ireland Men's and Women's U19 Teams became the new focus of the Academy, competing successfully at World Cups since 2018 under a new focus.

The success of the Ireland Cricket Academy can be seen through the development of some of the cricketers in a variety of formats, Harry Tector, Lorcan Tucker and Josh Little. Those players were home grown talent, developed without the benefits of County Cricket which was more accessible to previous developing talent.

== Current recruits ==
=== Men's ===
- Mark Adair
- Rory Anders
- Peter Chase
- Rishi Chopra
- Varun Chopra
- Scott Campbell
- Jack Carson
- Sonny Cott
- Colin Currie
- David Delany
- Adam Dennison
- Peter Eakin
- Jamie Grassi
- Ryan Hunter
- Josh Little
- Tyrone Kane
- Gary McClintock
- Will McClintock
- James McCollum
- Harry Tector
- Jack Tector
- Morgan Topping
- Lorcan Tucker
- Fiachra Tucker
- Ben White

=== Women's ===
- Kim Garth
- Fiona Gill
- Gaby Lewis
- Lucy O'Reilly
- Elena Tice

== Coaching staff ==
- Head coach: Peter Johnston
