= The Green, Comber =

Cricket ground in Northern Ireland

Coordinates: 54°33′11.23″N 5°44′55.87″W

The Green
- Location: Comber, Northern Ireland
- Establishment: 1857
- Capacity: 2000
- End names
- Pavilion End; Mount Alexander End
- As of 24 December 2019; Source: Cricinfo

The Green is a cricket ground in Comber, Northern Ireland and the home of North Down Cricket Club. The ground was established in 1857 and had capacity of 2000 in early days. The two ends are Pavilion End and Mount Alexander End. In 1995, the ground hosted its first List A match when Ireland played Kent in the 1995 Benson & Hedges Cup. In 2005, the ground hosted three further List A matches in the 2005 ICC Trophy, which saw matches between Ireland and Uganda, Bermuda and Uganda, and Namibia and Oman.
