= Mark Hawthorne (umpire) =

Northern Irish cricket umpire

Personal information
- Born: 16 September 1962 (age 64); Belfast, Northern Ireland

Umpiring information
- ODIs umpired: 33 (2011–2021)
- T20Is umpired: 28 (2012–2025)
- WODIs umpired: 9 (2013–2024)
- WT20Is umpired: 10 (2019–2025)
- Source: Cricinfo, 15 August 2022

Mark Hawthorne (born 16 September 1962) is a Northern Irish cricket umpire. He stood in his first One Day International (ODI), between Ireland and Pakistan, on 28 May 2011. His Twenty20 International (T20I) umpiring debut was in a fixture between the Netherlands and Canada in the 2012 ICC World Twenty20 Qualifier, on 13 March 2012.

He was among the on-field umpires for the 2018 Under-19 Cricket World Cup. In February 2019, he was selected as part of an umpire exchange programme with Cricket West Indies to stand in matches in the Caribbean. The same month, he was one of the two on-field umpires in the match between Trinidad and Tobago and the Windward Islands in the 2018–19 Regional Four Day Competition fixture at Windsor Park in Roseau.

In April 2019, he was one of four umpires to be awarded a full-time season contract by Cricket Ireland, the first time that Cricket Ireland offered such contracts to umpires.

Hawthorne ended his international umpiring career after the third T20I of England's tour of Ireland in 2025.

== See also ==
- List of One Day International cricket umpires
- List of Twenty20 International cricket umpires
