= Graham Hume =

South African-Irish cricketer

Personal information
- Full name: Graham Ian Hume
- Born: 23 November 1990 (age 35); Johannesburg, Gauteng, South Africa
- Batting: Left-handed
- Bowling: Right-arm fast-medium
- Role: Bowler

International information
- National side: Ireland
- Test debut (cap 20): 4 April 2023 v Bangladesh
- Last Test: 24 April 2023 v Sri Lanka
- ODI debut (cap 63): 15 July 2022 v New Zealand
- Last ODI: 18 February 2025 v Zimbabwe
- T20I debut (cap 55): 12 August 2022 v Afghanistan
- Last T20I: 17 September 2025 v England

Domestic team information
- Years: Team
- 2009/10–2012/13: Gauteng
- 2013/14–2018/19: KwaZulu-Natal Inland
- 2014/15: Dolphins
- 2019–2025: North West Warriors

Career statistics
Competition	Test	ODI	T20I	FC
Matches	3	21	10	103
Runs scored	36	79	38	1,835
Batting average	7.20	15.80	19.00	18.16
100s/50s	0/0	0/0	0/0	1/5
Top score	14	21	20*	105
Balls bowled	300	964	188	13,163
Wickets	2	28	11	317
Bowling average	104.50	30.64	27.45	18.64
5 wickets in innings	0	0	0	14
10 wickets in match	0	0	0	0
Best bowling	1/85	4/34	3/17	7/23
Catches/stumpings	0/–	3/–	1/–	55/–
- Source: Cricinfo, 7 December 2025

Graham Ian Hume (born 23 November 1990) is a South African born cricketer who plays for the Ireland cricket team. He made his international debut for Ireland in July 2022.

== Career ==
He was included in the KwaZulu-Natal Inland squad for the 2016 Africa T20 Cup. He was the leading wicket-taker in the 2017–18 Sunfoil 3-Day Cup for KwaZulu-Natal Inland, with 40 dismissals in ten matches.

In May 2019, he played for the North West Warriors in the 2019 Inter-Provincial Cup in Ireland. In February 2021, Hume was named in the Ireland Wolves' squad for their tour to Bangladesh. In May 2022, Cricket Ireland awarded Hume with a nine-month contract.

In June 2022, Hume was named in Ireland's One Day International (ODI) squad for their series against New Zealand. He made his ODI debut on 15 July 2022, for Ireland against New Zealand. In July 2022, Hume was added to Ireland's Twenty20 International (T20I) squad for their two-match series against South Africa in Bristol. Later the same month, Hand was also named in Ireland's T20I squads for their home series against Afghanistan.

== International career ==
Hume made his T20I debut on 12 August 2022, against Afghanistan. He made his ODI debut against Zimbabwe on 21 January 2023. Hume was named in Ireland's Test squad for their tours of Bangladesh in March 2023 and Sri Lanka in April 2023. He was also named in the T20I and ODI squads for the tours. He made his Test debut for Ireland against Bangladesh, on 4 April 2023.

In May 2024, he was named in Ireland's squad for the 2024 ICC Men's T20 World Cup tournament.
