= George Dockrell =

Irish cricketer

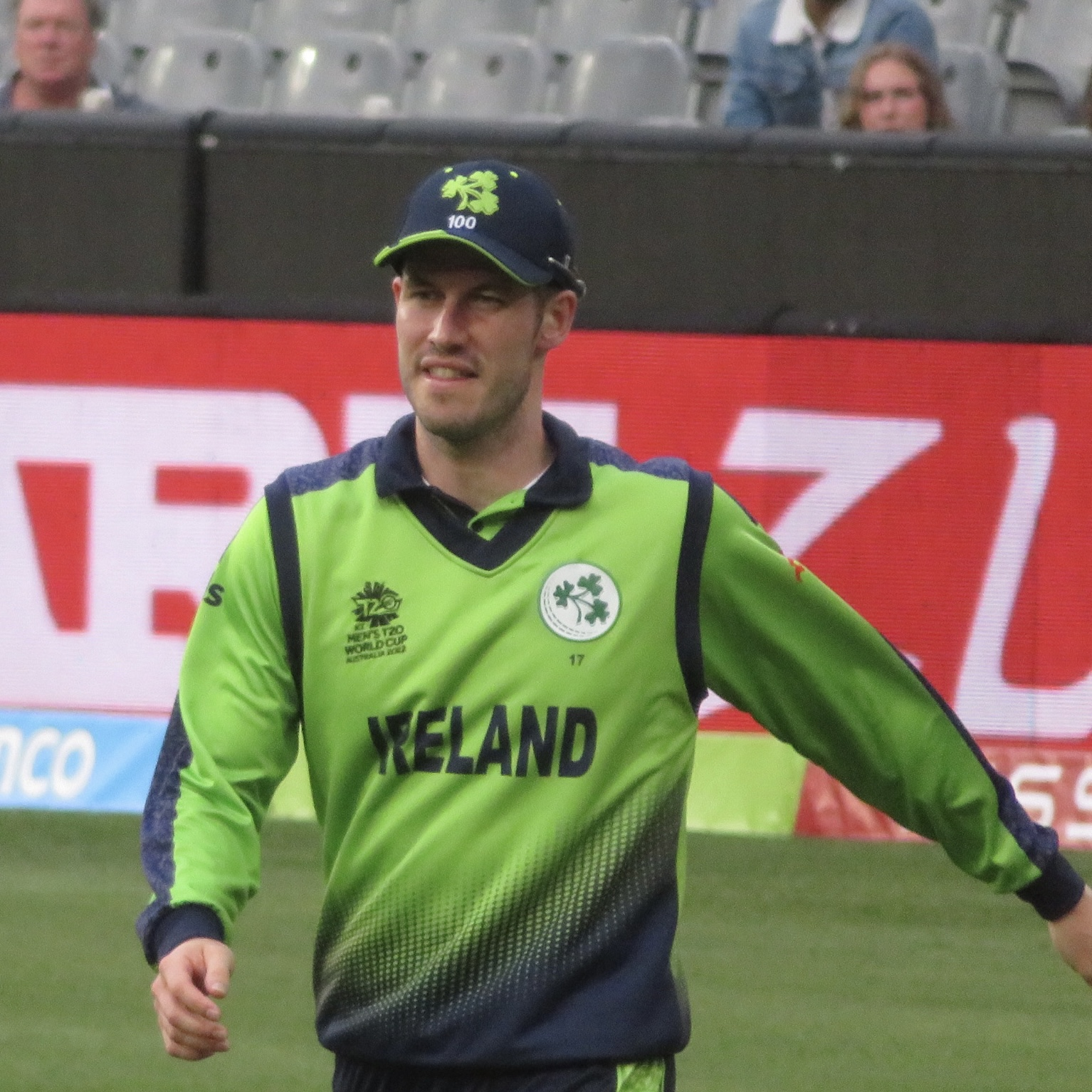
- Dockrell in 2022

Personal information
- Full name: George Henry Dockrell
- Born: 22 July 1992 (age 34); Dublin, Ireland
- Batting: Right-handed
- Bowling: Slow left-arm orthodox
- Role: All-rounder

International information
- National side: Ireland (2010-present)
- Test debut (cap 13): 15 March 2019 v Afghanistan
- Last Test: 16 April 2023 v Sri Lanka
- ODI debut (cap 31): 15 April 2010 v West Indies
- Last ODI: 1 November 2026 v Namibia
- ODI shirt no.: 50
- T20I debut (cap 17): 1 February 2010 v Afghanistan
- Last T20I: 28 June 2026 v India
- T20I shirt no.: 50

Domestic team information
- Years: Team
- 2011–2015: Somerset
- 2015: → Sussex (loan)
- 2014–present: Leinster Lightning
- 2024: Lancashire
- 2026: Dublin Guardians

Career statistics
Competition	Test	ODI	T20I	FC
Matches	2	139	159	63
Runs scored	98	1,610	1,426	1,128
Batting average	24.50	23.00	20.37	19.44
100s/50s	0/0	0/6	0/2	0/4
Top score	39	91*	58*	92
Balls bowled	369	4,943	1,730	11,836
Wickets	3	113	91	187
Bowling average	77.66	35.80	22.10	30.51
5 wickets in innings	0	0	0	8
10 wickets in match	0	0	0	0
Best bowling	2/63	4/24	4/20	6/27
Catches/stumpings	0/–	53/–	77/–	28/–
- Source: ESPNcricinfo, 1 November 2026

George Henry Dockrell (born 22 July 1992) is an Irish cricketer, who plays international cricket for Ireland, having learned his cricket at Leinster Cricket Club, Dublin. Known as an all-rounder, Dockrell is a right-handed batsman and slow left-arm orthodox bowler. He was a member of the class of 2010 in Gonzaga College, Dublin. In December 2018, he was one of nineteen players to be awarded a central contract by Cricket Ireland for the 2019 season. In January 2020, he was one of nineteen players to be awarded a central contract by Cricket Ireland, the first year in which all contracts were awarded on a full-time basis.

== Early career ==
Dockrell has represented Ireland from U-13 level upwards. In 2009, Dockrell was part of the 2010 U-19 Cricket World Cup Qualifier winning squad. Victory in this tournament allowed Ireland to take part in the 2010 U-19 Cricket World Cup, where Dockrell made his Youth One Day International debut against South Africa U-19s. Dockrell played a further three Youth One Day Internationals in the tournament.

Dockrell made his debut for Ireland A in 2008. The same year he was invited to coaching sessions with Somerset County Cricket Club.

== Domestic and T20 career ==
Somerset County Cricket Club were interested in Dockrell since he was 15. On 18 July 2010, it was announced that Somerset had offered Dockrell a two-year contract. Speaking of his aims, Dockrell said "My ambitions are to keep making progress with Ireland, but also to get into a county first team by developing all aspects of my game". Commitment to Ireland's internationals in the Intercontinental Cup limited Dockrell's availability for Somerset towards the end of the 2010 season. During the tournament, Dockrell suffered a dislocated shoulder. The rehabilitation period meant he missed much of his first season with Somerset. He featured in a single County Championship match, although his appearances in limited overs games were more frequent, playing in the semi-final of the Twenty20 Cup and the Champions Trophy.

A team made up of some of the best players from Associate and Affiliate teams was put together to face England in Dubai in January 2012. The three-day match was part of England's preparation for a series against Pakistan later that month. Dockrell was one of four Ireland players included in the 12-man squad. Fellow left-arm spinner Murali Kartik left Somerset at the end of the season, giving Dockrell the opportunity to establish himself in the team. In Somerset's opening match of the 2012 County Championship Dockrell took 6/27 in the second innings against Middlesex to help his team to a six-wicket victory.

At the end of the 2015 season, Dockrell was released by Somerset.

Dockrell was the leading run-scorer and wicket-taker in the 2018 Inter-Provincial Cup, scoring 231 runs and taking ten wickets in the tournament. In November 2018, he was named the Men's Inter-Provincial Player of the Year at the annual Cricket Ireland Awards.

In July 2019, he was selected to play for the Dublin Chiefs in the inaugural edition of the Euro T20 Slam cricket tournament. However, the following month the tournament was cancelled.

On 4 May 2021, during the 2021 Inter-Provincial Cup, Dockrell scored his first century in List A cricket, with 100 not out against Northern Knights.

Dockrell signed a short-term white ball contract with Lancashire in July 2024.

== International career ==
By early in 2010, Ireland had lost their two most experienced spinners, Kyle McCallan and Regan West, to retirement and injury respectively. For the 2010 ICC World Twenty20 Qualifier and the 2010 Quadrangular Twenty20 Series in Sri Lanka, young spinners Dockrell and Gary Kidd were chosen. Dockrell made his debut for the senior Ireland team in the 2010 Quadrangular Twenty20 Series in Sri Lanka. Dockrell's debut Twenty20 match against Afghanistan was also his debut Twenty20 International. Dockrell took figures of 2/11 in the match as Ireland won by 5 wickets. Dockrell's second Twenty20 match came against Sri Lanka A, where he claimed a single wicket.

After Impressing in the 2010 ICC World Twenty20 Qualifier, Dockrell was selected in the Ireland squad for the 2010 ICC World Twenty20, playing a starring role as the tournament's youngest player, taking four wickets against the West Indies and troubling Kevin Pietersen in a tight bowling display in the abandoned encounter with England. Dockrell reflected that "Taking three wickets against West Indies gave me a huge boost in confidence. I was very nervous before that game, but by the time we came to play England I was a lot calmer. I was really happy with how the tournament went for me overall". He was forced to miss Ireland's ODI encounter with Australia on 17 June 2010 because he was sitting a Biology exam in the Leaving Certificate.

In May 2011, Dockrell was selected in Ireland's 15 man squad for the 2011 Cricket World Cup.

Australia hosted the 2012 Under-19 World Cup in August 2012 and Dockrell was named as the captain for the tournament.

In January 2019, he was named in Ireland's squad for their one-off Test against Afghanistan in India. He made his Test debut for Ireland against Afghanistan on 15 March 2019. In September 2019, he was named in Ireland's squad for the 2019 ICC T20 World Cup Qualifier tournament in the United Arab Emirates.

On 10 July 2020, Dockrell was named in Ireland's 21-man squad to travel to England to start training behind closed doors for the ODI series against the England cricket team.

In February 2021, Dockrell was named as the captain of the Ireland Wolves' squad for their red-ball matches against Bangladesh. However, the day before the squad departed for Bangladesh, it was announced that Dockrell had opted out of the tour. The same day, Ruhan Pretorius was added to the squad and Harry Tector was confirmed as captain. In September 2021, Dockrell was named in Ireland's provisional squad for the 2021 ICC Men's T20 World Cup. Dockrell was named in Ireland's Test squad for their tours of Bangladesh in March 2023 and Sri Lanka in April 2023. He was also named in the T20I and ODI squads for the tours.

In May 2024, he was named in Ireland's squad for the 2024 ICC Men's T20 World Cup tournament.
