= Sydney Parade =

Cricket ground

Coordinates: 53°19′29.96″N 6°12′54.27″W

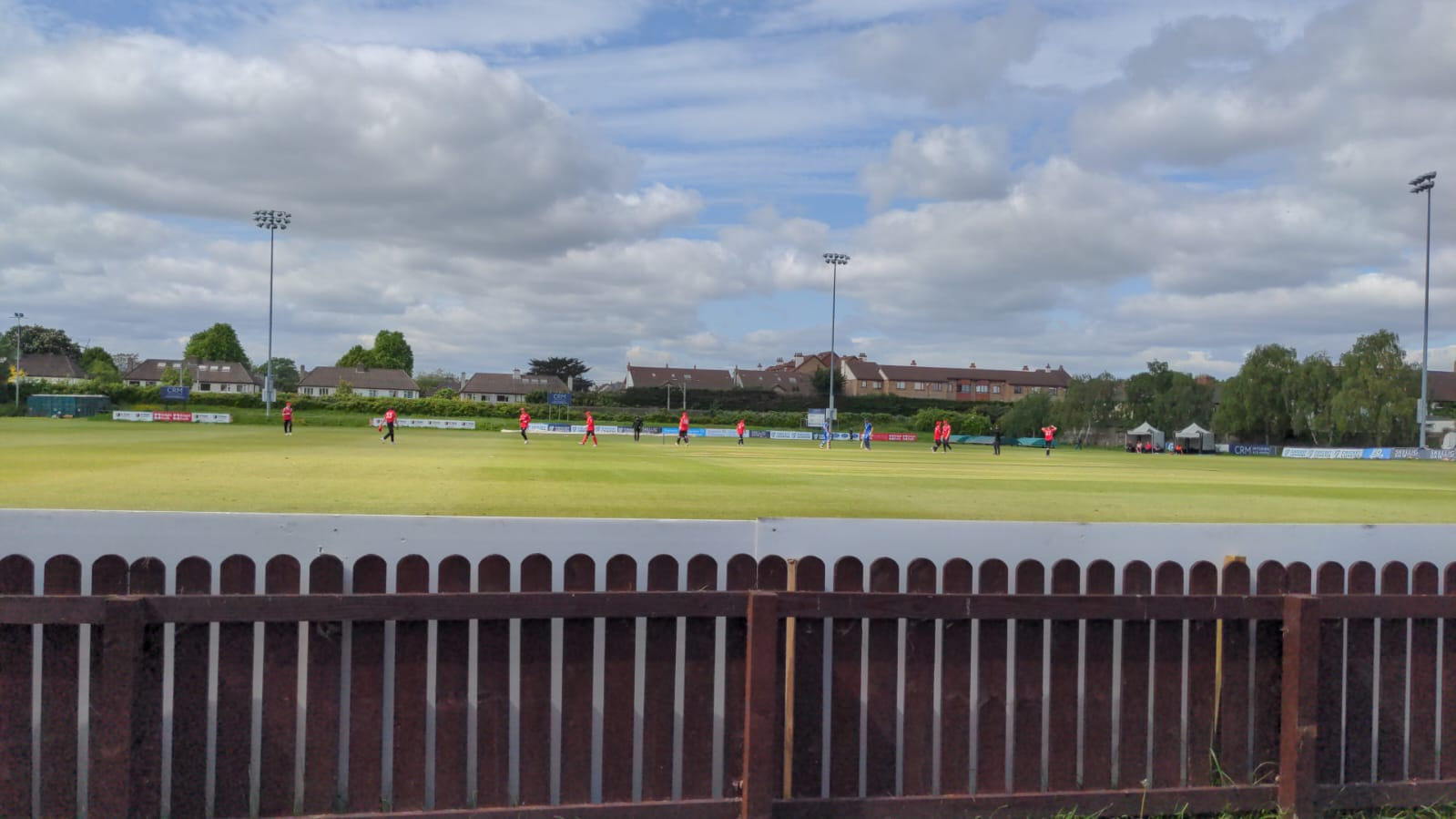
- View across Sydney Parade as Leinster Lightning play Munster Reds.

Ground information
- Location: Dublin, Ireland
- Establishment: 1897 (first recorded match)
- Owner: Pembroke Cricket Club, Monkstown Football Club (co-owners)

International information
- First WODI: 19 July 1995: Ireland v Netherlands
- Last WODI: 27 July 2000: Ireland v Pakistan
- First WT20I: 1 July 2018: Ireland v Bangladesh
- Last WT20I: 23 July 2025: Ireland v Zimbabwe
- As of 13 August 2024; Source: Cricinfo

Sydney Parade is a cricket ground in Dublin, Ireland. The first recorded match on the ground was in 1897, when Pembroke played Leicester Ivanhoe. In 1965, the ground hosted a first-class match between Ireland and Scotland, which resulted in a Scottish victory by an innings and 22 runs.

In 1995, the ground hosted a Women's One Day International between Ireland women and the Netherlands women. The ground hosted further Women's One Day Internationals in 1996 when Ireland women played New Zealand women, in 1997 when Ireland women played South Africa women, and in 2000 when Ireland women played Pakistan women.

The ground is the home of club cricket side Pembroke Cricket Club and rugby union club Monkstown FC.
