= Munster Reds =

Cricket team

Personnel
- Captain: PJ Moor
- Coach: Jeremy Bray
- Owner: Munster Cricket Union

Team information
- Founded: 2017
- Home ground: The Mardyke, Cork

History
- Inter-Provincial Cup wins: 1
- Official website: Munster Reds

Munster Reds were an Irish inter-provincial cricket team based in Cork, in the province of Munster.

== History ==
In April 2017, Cricket Ireland approved the participation of the team in the Interprovincial Twenty20 Cup, the highest level of T20 domestic cricket in Ireland. They joined Leinster Lightning, North West Warriors and Northern Knights in the 2017 tournament.

They debuted in the Inter-Provincial Trophy on 26 May 2017, and won their first match, against North West Warriors, on 6 July 2018.

Following a successful end to their 2018 season, there was talk of Munster Reds being included in the Interprovincial One-Day Trophy competition, but while this is an objective of Cricket Ireland, it was confirmed this would not happen in 2019. In February 2021, Cricket Ireland confirmed that the team would take part in the 2021 tournament.

Munster won their inaugural Inter-Provincial title when they won the 2022 Inter-Provincial Cup.

Former Ireland international Jeremy Bray was appointed as head-coach in 2023.

== Honours ==
- Inter-Provincial Cup
  - Winners: 2022
- Inter-Provincial Trophy
  - Runners-up: 2022

== Notable players ==
- Kevin O'Brien
- Curtis Campher
- Harry Tector

== Grounds ==
Munster Reds played their home fixtures at The Mardyke in Cork, with the ground so far hosting ten T20s and 7 List A matches.
