= Irish cricket team in Bangladesh in 2025–26 =

International cricket tour

	Bangladesh	Ireland
- Dates: 10 November – 2 December 2025
Captains	Najmul Hossain Shanto (Tests); Litton Das (T20Is)	Andrew Balbirnie (Tests); Paul Stirling (T20Is)

Test series
- Result: Bangladesh won the 2-match series 2–0
Most runs	Mahmudul Hasan Joy (265)	Jordan Neill (145)
Most wickets	Taijul Islam (13)	Andy McBrine (8)
- Player of the series: Taijul Islam (Ban)

Twenty20 International series
- Results: Bangladesh won the 3-match series 2–1
Most runs	Towhid Hridoy (89)	Paul Stirling (88)
Most wickets	Mahedi Hasan (4); Rishad Hossain (4)	Matthew Humphreys (4); Mark Adair (4)
- Player of the series: Mahedi Hasan (Ban)

The Ireland cricket team toured Bangladesh in November and December 2025 to play the Bangladesh cricket team. The tour consisted of two Test and three Twenty20 International (T20I) matches. In September 2025, the Bangladesh Cricket Board (BCB) confirmed the fixtures for the tour as a part of the 2025–26 home international season.

Originally, the series was scheduled to be played with two Tests, three ODIs and three T20Is. Cricket Ireland (CI) requested the Bangladesh Cricket Board (BCB) to reduce one Test match from the schedule. But later both the boards agreed with two Test and three T20I matches.

== Squads ==
Bangladesh		Ireland	
Tests	T20Is	Tests	T20Is
Najmul Hossain Shanto (c); Khaled Ahmed; Jaker Ali (wk); Litton Das (wk); Mominul Haque; Ebadot Hossain; Shadman Islam; Taijul Islam; Mahmudul Hasan Joy; Hasan Mahmud; Mehidy Hasan Miraz; Hasan Murad; Mushfiqur Rahim; Nahid Rana	Litton Das (c, wk); Saif Hassan (vc); Nasum Ahmed; Jaker Ali (wk); Mahidul Islam Ankon; Parvez Hossain Emon; Mahedi Hasan; Nurul Hasan; Tanzid Hasan; Rishad Hossain; Shamim Hossain (Note: In squad for third T20I only.); Tawhid Hridoy; Shoriful Islam; Mustafizur Rahman; Mohammad Saifuddin; Tanzim Hasan Sakib	Andrew Balbirnie (c); Curtis Campher; Cade Carmichael; Stephen Doheny (wk); Gavin Hoey; Graham Hume; Matthew Humphreys; Andy McBrine; Barry McCarthy; Liam McCarthy; Jordan Neill; Paul Stirling; Harry Tector; Lorcan Tucker (wk); Craig Young	Paul Stirling (c); Mark Adair; ~~Ross Adair~~; Ben Calitz (wk); Curtis Campher; Gareth Delany; George Dockrell; Matthew Humphreys; Josh Little; Barry McCarthy; Jordan Neill; Harry Tector; Tim Tector; Lorcan Tucker (wk); Ben White; Craig Young

On 10 November, Ross Adair was ruled out of the T20I series with a bone stress in the knee and was replaced by Jordan Neill.

On 30 November, Shamim Hossain was added to squad for 3rd T20I.

== Test series ==
=== 1st Test ===
11–14 November 2025
Scorecard

Ireland	v	Bangladesh
286 (92.2 overs); Paul Stirling 60 (76); Mehidy Hasan Miraz 3/50 (23 overs)		587/8d (141 overs); Mahmudul Hasan Joy 171 (286); Matthew Humphreys 5/170 (43 overs)
254 (70.2 overs); Andy McBrine 52 (106); Hasan Murad 4/60 (14 overs)

Bangladesh won by an innings and 47 runs
Sylhet International Cricket Stadium, Sylhet
Umpires: Sam Nogajski (Aus) and Ahsan Raza (Pak)
Player of the match: Mahmudul Hasan Joy (Ban)

- Ireland won the toss and elected to bat.
- Hasan Murad (Ban), Cade Carmichael and Jordan Neill (Ire) all made their Test debuts.
- Mahmudul Hasan Joy (Ban) scored his maiden 150 and career best innings in his Test career at the first innings.

=== 2nd Test ===
19–23 November 2025
Scorecard

Bangladesh	v	Ireland
476 (141.1 overs); Litton Das 128 (192); Andy McBrine 6/109 (33.1 overs)		265 (88.3 overs); Lorcan Tucker 75* (171); Taijul Islam 4/76 (35.3 overs)
297/4d (69 overs); Mominul Haque 87 (118); Gavin Hoey 2/84 (17 overs)		291 (113.3 overs); Curtis Campher 71* (259); Hasan Murad 4/44 (22.3 overs)

Bangladesh won by 217 runs
Sher-e-Bangla National Cricket Stadium, Dhaka
Umpires: Richard Illingworth (Eng) and Sam Nogajski (Aus)
Player of the match: Mushfiqur Rahim (Ban)

- Bangladesh won the toss and elected to bat.
- Stephen Doheny and Gavin Hoey (Ire) both made their Test debuts.
- Mushfiqur Rahim became the first Bangladeshi cricketer to play in 100 Test matches.
- Litton Das (Ban) scored his 3,000th run in Tests.

== T20I series ==
=== 1st T20I ===
27 November 2025
18:00 (N)
Scorecard

Ireland; 181/4 (20 overs)	v	Bangladesh; 142/9 (20 overs)
Harry Tector 69* (45); Tanzim Hasan Sakib 2/41 (4 overs)		Towhid Hridoy 83* (50); Matthew Humphreys 4/13 (4 overs)

Ireland won by 39 runs
Bir Shrestho Flight Lieutenant Matiur Rahman Cricket Stadium, Chattogram
Umpires: Morshed Ali Khan (Ban) and Gazi Sohel (Ban)
Player of the match: Matthew Humphreys (Ire)

- Bangladesh won the toss and elected to field.

=== 2nd T20I ===
29 November 2025
18:00 (N)
Scorecard

Ireland; 170/6 (20 overs)	v	Bangladesh; 174/6 (19.4 overs)
Lorcan Tucker 41 (32); Mahedi Hasan 3/25 (4 overs)		Litton Das 57 (37); Gareth Delany 2/28 (4 overs)

Bangladesh won by 4 wickets
Bir Shrestho Flight Lieutenant Matiur Rahman Cricket Stadium, Chattogram
Umpires: Morshed Ali Khan (Ban) and Masudur Rahman (Ban)
Player of the match: Litton Das (Ban)

- Ireland won the toss and elected to bat.

=== 3rd T20I ===
2 December 2025
14:00
Scorecard

Ireland; 117 (19.5 overs)	v	Bangladesh; 119/2 (13.4 overs)
Paul Stirling 38 (27); Mushfiqur Rahman 3/11 (3 overs)		Tanzid Hasan 55* (36); Harry Tector 1/17 (3 overs)

Bangladesh won by 8 wickets
Bir Shrestho Flight Lieutenant Matiur Rahman Cricket Stadium, Chattogram
Umpires: Tanvir Ahmed (Ban) and Masudur Rahman (Ban)
Player of the match: Tanzid Hasan (Ban)

- Ireland won the toss and elected to bat.
