= 2025 Inter-Provincial Cup =

Cricket tournament

- Dates: 7 May – 27 August 2025
- Administrator: Cricket Ireland
- Cricket format: List A
- Tournament format: Double round-robin
- Host: Ireland
- Champions: Leinster Lightning (10th title)
- Participants: 4
- Matches: 12
- Most runs: Andrew Balbirnie (North West Warriors) (445)
- Most wickets: Jai Moondra (Leinster Lightning) (11)

The 2025 Inter-Provincial Cup was the thirteenth edition of the Inter-Provincial Cup, a List A cricket competition in Ireland. The tournament began on 7 May 2025, and the last round was held on 27 August 2025. Four provincial teams took part in the tournament. In March 2025 Cricket Ireland confirmed the fixtures for the competition.

== Points table ==
Pos	Team	Pld	W	L	T	NR	BP	Pts	NRR
1	Leinster Lightning	6	4	1	0	1	1	19	0.744
2	Munster Reds	6	3	2	0	1	1	15	0.219
3	Northern Knights	6	2	3	0	1	0	10	−0.565
4	North West Warriors	6	1	4	0	1	0	6	−0.420

Source: ESPNcricinfo
- Points system:
  - Win - 4, Loss - 0, Tie - 0, No Result - 2, Abandon - 2
- Bonus Point:
  - When Run Rate is 1.25x than Opponents' - 1

== Fixtures ==
=== Round 1 ===
7 May 2025
10:45
Scorecard

Leinster Lightning; 328/8 (50 overs)	v	Munster Reds; 280 (46.1 overs)
Lorcan Tucker 121 (127); Josh Manley 4/75 (10 overs)		Philippus Roux 87* (68); Jai Moondra 3/42 (8.1 overs)

Leinster Lightning won by 48 runs
Oak Hill Cricket Club Ground, County Wicklow
Umpires: Jonathan Kennedy and Aidan Seaver

- Munster Reds won the toss and elected to field.
- Jai Moondra (Leinster Lightning) made his List A debut.
- Points: Leinster Lightning 4, Munster Reds 0

7 May 2025
10:45
Scorecard

North West Warriors; 283/5 (50 overs)	v	Northern Knights; 286/6 (46.1 overs)
Sam Topping 120 (124); Thomas Mayes 3/66 (10 overs)		Cade Carmichael 86 (92); Scott MacBeth 4/44 (10 overs)

Northern Knights won by 4 wickets
Stormont, Belfast
Umpires: Mark Hawthorne and Gareth Morrison

- North West Warriors won the toss and elected to bat.
- Adam Leckey (Northern Knights) and Josh Wilson (North West Warriors) both made their List A debuts.
- Points: Northern Knights 4, North West Warriors 0

=== Round 2 ===
13 May 2025
10:45
Scorecard

Northern Knights; 204 (39.1 overs)	v	Leinster Lightning; 210/6 (46.1 overs)
Cade Carmichael 107 (101); Jai Moondra 3/45 (8.1 overs)		George Dockrell 101* (121); Thomas Mayes 3/40 (10 overs)

Leinster Lightning won by 4 wickets
Oak Hill Cricket Club Ground, County Wicklow
Umpires: Jonathan Kennedy and Jareth McCready

- Leinster Lightning won the toss and elected to field.
- Points: Leinster Lightning 4, Northern Knights 0

13 May 2025
10:45
Scorecard

North West Warriors; 245/6 (50 overs)	v	Munster Reds; 248/7 (48 overs)
Andrew Balbirnie 101 (135); Liam McCarthy 3/43 (10 overs)		Philippe le Roux 74* (83); Andy McBrine 3/46 (10 overs)

Munster Reds won by 3 wickets
Richard Beamish Cricket Grounds, Mardyke
Umpires: Mark Hawthorne and Aidan Seaver

- Munster Reds won the toss and elected to field.
- Point: Munster Reds 4, North-West Warriors 0

=== Round 3 ===
15 May 2025
10:45
Scorecard

Leinster Lightning; 275 (49.5 overs)	v	North West Warriors; 231 (48.4 overs)
Christopher De Freitas 143* (155); Ryan MacBeth 4/33 (8 overs)		Andy McBrine 64 (60); Nasir Totakhil 2/15 (4 overs)

Leinster Lightning won by 44 runs
Oak Hill Cricket Club Ground, County Wicklow
Umpires: Mark Hawthorne and Aidan Seaver

- North West Warriors won the toss and elected to field.
- Christopher De Freitas (Leinster Lightning) scored his first century in List A cricket.
- Points: Leinster Lightning 4, North-West Warriors 0

15 May 2025
10:45
Scorecard

Northern Knights; 274 (47.2 overs)	v	Munster Reds; 278/4 (40 overs)
Cade Carmichael 65 (56); Liam McCarthy 3/59 (9 overs)		Stephen Doheny 129 (111); Matthew Humphreys 2/63 (10 overs)

Munster Reds won by 6 wickets
Stormont, Belfast
Umpires: George Brolly and Jonathan Kennedy

- Munster Reds won the toss and elected to field.
- Points: Munster Reds 5, Northern Knights 0

=== Round 4 ===
13 August 2025
10:45
Scorecard

Munster Reds; 287 (50 overs)	v	Leinster Lightning; 261 (48.1 overs)
Kian Hilton 64 (56); Reuben Wilson 3/52 (9 overs)		Lorcan Tucker 63 (61); Curtis Campher 3/24 (10 overs)

Munster Reds won by 26 runs
Richard Beamish Cricket Grounds, Mardyke
Umpires: Azam Baig and Jonathan Kennedy

- Leinster Lightning won the toss and elected to field.
- Matt Hollard (Leinster Lightning) and Bakhtyar Nabi (Munster Reds) both made their List A debuts.
- Points: Munster Reds 4, Leinster Lightning 0

13 August 2025
10:45
Scorecard

North West Warriors; 278/5 (50 overs)	v	Northern Knights; 281/7 (46.4 overs)
Sam Topping 111 (143); Cian Robertson 3/49 (10 overs)		Ben Calitz 72 (78); Robbie Millar 3/69 (9 overs)

Northern Knights won by 3 wickets
Bready Cricket Club Ground, Magheramason
Umpires: Mark Hawthorne and Gareth Morrison
Player of the match: Sam Topping (North West Warriors)

- North West Warriors won the toss and elected to bat.
- Robbie Millar (North West Warriors) made his List A debut.
- Points: Northern Knights 4, North West Warriors 0

=== Round 5 ===
20 August 2025
10:45
Scorecard

Northern Knights; 223 (42.2 overs)	v	Leinster Lightning; 226/4 (34.1 overs)
Cade Carmichael 105 (119); Matt Hollard 5/62 (9.2 overs)		Tim Tector 57 (34); Matthew Humphreys 3/34 (10 overs)

Leinster Lightning won by 6 wickets
Stormont, Belfast
Umpires: Mark Hawthorne and Jonathan Kennedy
Player of the match: Matt Hollard (Leinster Lighting)

- Leinster Lightning won the toss and elected to field.
- Points: Leinster Lightning 5, Northern Knights 0

20 August 2025
10:45
Scorecard

North West Warriors; 334/9 (50 overs)	v	Munster Reds; 332/9 (50 overs)
Jared Wilson 64 (42); Oliver Riley 3/50 (9 overs)		Suliman Safi 131 (111); Robbie Millar 2/35 (5 overs)

North West Warriors won by 2 runs
Woodvale Road, Eglinton
Umpires: Roland Black and Jareth McCready

- Munster Reds won the toss and elected to field.
- Suliman Safi (Munster Reds) scored his maiden century in List A cricket.
- Points; North West Warriors 4, Munster Reds 0

=== Round 6 ===
27 August 2025
10:45
Scorecard

North West Warriors; 155/4 (28 overs)	v	Leinster Lightning; 9/1 (3 overs)
Andrew Balbirnie 82* (80); Matt Hollard 2/14 (4 overs)		Harry Tector 5* (5); David O'Sullivan 1/2 (1 over)

No result
Bready Cricket Club Ground, Magheramason
Umpires: Roland Black and Mark Hawthorne

- Leinster Lightning won the toss and elected to field.
- Billy Dougherty (North West Warriors) made his List A debut.
- Rain prevented any further play.

27 August 2025
10:45
Scorecard

Munster Reds	v	Northern Knights

Match abandoned
Richard Beamish Cricket Grounds, Mardyke
Umpires: Jonathan Kennedy and Gareth Morrison

- No toss.
- No play was possible due to rain.
