= 2026 Inter-Provincial Cup =

Cricket tournament

- Dates: 30 June – 23 July 2026
- Administrator: Cricket Ireland
- Cricket format: List A
- Tournament format(s): Double round-robin and final
- Host: Ireland
- Champions: Leinster Lightning (11th title)
- Runners-up: North West Warriors
- Participants: 3
- Matches: 7
- Most runs: Stephen Doheny (409)
- Most wickets: Gavin Hoey (10)

The 2026 Inter-Provincial Cup was the fourteenth edition of the Inter-Provincial Cup, a List A cricket competition in Ireland. The tournament began on 30 June and the final was held on 23 July 2026. Three provincial teams took part in the tournament. In May 2026, Cricket Ireland confirmed the fixtures for the competition.

== Teams and standings ==
=== Points table ===
Pos	Team	Pld	W	L	NR	Pts	NRR	Qualification
1	Leinster Lightning	4	3	1	0	14	0.805	Advanced to the final
2	North West Warriors	4	3	1	0	13	0.490	Advanced to the final
3	Northern Knights	4	0	4	0	0	−1.059	

Source: Cricinfo

=== Points summary ===
Team	Group matches				Play-offs
Team	1	2	3	4	Final
Leinster Lightning	0	4	9	14	W
Northern Knights	0	0	0	0	—
North West Warriors	4	8	8	13	L

Win	Loss	Tie	No result	Eliminated

- Note: The total points at the end of each group match are listed.
- Note: Click on the points or results to see the match summary.

== Fixtures ==
Match 1
30 June 2026
10:45
Scorecard

Leinster Lightning; 211/6 (37 overs)	v	North West Warriors; 215/4 (35.5 overs)
Lorcan Tucker 74* (47); Craig Young 2/31 (6 overs)		Gavin Roulston 64 (64); George Dockrell 2/30 (8 overs)

North West Warriors won by 6 runs (DLS method)
Bready Cricket Club Ground, Bready
Umpires: Roland Black and Jonathan Kennedy

- The match was reduced to 37 overs per side due to rain.
- Mark Tonge and Jeremy Martins (Leinster Lightning) both made their List A debut.
- North West Warriors were set a revised target of 215 runs from 37 overs due to rain.
- Points: North West Warriors 4, Leinster Lightning 0

Match 2
2 July 2026
10:45
Scorecard

North West Warriors; 239/9 (50 overs)	v	Northern Knights; 227 (47.4 overs)
Andy McBrine 69 (92); Shane Dadswell 4/25 (7 overs)		James McCollum 50 (53); Craig Young 3/42 (10 overs)

North West Warriors won by 12 runs
Stormont Cricket Ground, Belfast
Umpires: Gareth Morrison and Aidan Seaver
Player of the match: Andy McBrine (North West Warriors)

- Northern Knights won the toss and elected to field.
- Hassan Shahid (North West Warriors) made his List A debut.
- Points: North West warriors 4, Northern Knights 0

Match 3
7 July 2026
10:45
Scorecard

Northern Knights; 414/9 (50 overs)	v	Leinster Lightning; 418/8 (49.3 overs)
Ross Adair 95 (41); David Delany 2/42 (6 overs)		Christopher De Freitas 116 (76)

Leinster Lightning won by 2 wickets
Oak Hill Cricket Club Ground, Wicklow
Umpires: Roland Black and Gareth Morrison
Player of the match: Christopher De Freitas (Leinster Lightning)

- Leinster Lightning won the toss and elected to field.
- Ruhan Pretorius (Northern Knights) and Stephen Doheny (Leinster Lightning) both scored their 2,000th run in List A cricket.
- Shane Dadswell (Northern Knights) scored his 1,000th run in List A cricket.
- Points: Leinster Lightning 4, Northern Knights 0

Match 4
9 July 2026
10:45
Scorecard

Leinster Lightning; 259 (50 overs)	v	North West Warriors; 262/3 (39.2 overs)
Jake Egan 85 (116); Byron McDonough 4/50 (10 overs)		Christopher De Freitas 90 (84); Ryan MacBeth 1/26 (8 overs)

Leinster Lightning won by 7 wickets
Sydney Parade, Dublin
Umpires: Azam Baig and Ashish Sharma
Player of the match: Byron McDonough (Leinster Lightning)

- North West Warriors won the toss and elected to bat.
- Points: Leinster Lightning 5, North West Warriors 0

Match 5
14 July 2026
10:45
Scorecard

Northern Knights; 288 (47.3 overs)	v	Leinster Lightning; 289/4 (40 overs)
James McCollum 73 (86); Gavin Hoey 3/57 (10 overs)		Stephen Doheny 128 (116); Thomas Mayes 2/75 (9 overs)

Leinster Lightning won by 6 wickets
Wallace Park, Lisburn
Umpires: George Brolly and Mark Hawthorne
Player of the match: Stephen Doheny (Leinster Lightning)

- Leinster Lightning won the toss and elected to field.
- Points: Leinster Lightning 5, Northern Knights 0

Match 6
16 July 2026
10:45
Scorecard

Northern Knights; 277/7 (50 overs)	v	North West Warriors; 150 (26.1 overs)
Gavin Roulston 56 (75); Shane Dadswell 2/57 (10 overs)		Mark Adair 44 (31); Ryan MacBeth 4/55 (10 overs)

North west Warriors won by 127 runs
Woodvale Road, Eglinton
Umpires: George Brolly and Jareth McCready
Player of the match: Ryan MacBeth (North West Warriors)

- Northern Knights won the toss and elected to field.
- Points: North West Warriors 5, Northern Knights 0

== Final ==
23 July 2026
10:45
Scorecard

Leinster Lightning; 446/6 (50 overs)	v	North West Warriors; 276 (40.4 overs)
Stephen Doheny 124 (117); Andy McBrine 2/63 (10 overs)		Andy McBrine 100 (93); George Dockrell 4/55 (5.4 overs)

Leinster Lightning won by 170 runs
Sydney Parade, Dublin
Umpires: Azam Baig and Aidan Seaver
Player of the match: Tim Tector (Leinster Lightning)

- North West Warriors won the toss and elected to field.
- Luke Marillier (North West Warriors) made his List A debut.

== See also ==
- 2026 Inter-Provincial Trophy
