= Irish cricket team in Namibia in 2026–27 =

International cricket tour

	Namibia	Ireland
- Dates: 22 October – 1 November 2026
Captains	Gerhard Erasmus	Paul Stirling (Note: Lorcan Tucker captained Ireland in the 4th and 5th ODIs.)

One Day International series
- Results: Namibia won the 5-match series 3–2
Most runs	Gerhard Erasmus (263)	Curtis Campher (234)
Most wickets	Jack Brassell (11)	Jai Moondra (11)
- Player of the series: Gerhard Erasmus (Nam)

The Irish cricket team toured Namibia from October to November 2026 to play against the Namibia cricket team in a five-match One Day International series. In October 2026, Cricket Namibia (CN) confirmed the fixtures for the tour.

== Squads ==
Namibia	Ireland
Gerhard Erasmus (c); Jan Balt; Jack Brassell; Alexander Busing-Volschenk; Jan Frylinck; Zane Green (wk); Max Heingo; Malan Kruger; Michael van Lingen; Jan Nicol Loftie-Eaton; Willem Myburgh; Bernard Scholtz; Ben Shikongo; JJ Smit; Waldo Smith; Louren Steenkamp; Junior Taanyanda; Ruben Trumpelmann	Paul Stirling (c); Lorcan Tucker (vc, wk); Mark Adair; Andrew Balbirnie; Ben Calitz; Curtis Campher; Cade Carmichael; George Dockrell; Gavin Hoey; Matthew Humphreys; Andy McBrine; Liam McCarthy; Byron McDonough; Jai Moondra; Jordan Neill; Harry Tector; Tim Tector

On 28 October, Paul Stirling was ruled out of the series due to a finger injury, and was replaced by Tim Tector.

== ODI series ==
=== 1st ODI ===
22 October 2026
09:30
Scorecard

Ireland; 229/9 (50 overs)	v	Namibia; 174 (37.5 overs)
Paul Stirling 56 (71); Jan Nicol Loftie-Eaton 4/36 (9 overs)		Ruben Trumpelmann 50 (43); Gavin Hoey 3/29 (9 overs)

Ireland won by 55 runs
High Performance Oval, Windhoek
Umpires: Ewoud Lassen (Nam) and Jayaraman Madanagopal (Ind)
Player of the match: Gavin Hoey (Ire)

- Namibia won the toss and elected to field.

=== 2nd ODI ===
24 October 2026
09:30
Scorecard

Namibia; 321/6 (50 overs)	v	Ireland; 290 (47.3 overs)
Gerhard Erasmus 156* (125); Gavin Hoey 3/53 (10 overs)		Paul Stirling 77 (71); Jack Brassell 4/52 (10 overs)

Namibia won by 31 runs
Namibia Cricket Ground, Windhoek
Umpires: Ewoud Lassen (Nam) and Jayaraman Madanagopal (Ind)
Player of the match: Gerhard Erasmus (Nam)

- Ireland won the toss and elected to field.
- This was Namibia's first win against a full member side in ODIs.

=== 3rd ODI ===
27 October 2026
09:30
Scorecard

Namibia; 316/7 (50 overs)	v	Ireland; 253 (44.5 overs)
Jan Frylinck 126 (122); Andy McBrine 2/53 (10 overs)		Curtis Campher 106 (86); Bernard Scholtz 2/31 (10 overs)

Namibia won by 63 runs
High Performance Oval, Windhoek
Umpires: Ewoud Lassen (Nam) and Jayaraman Madanagopal (Ind)
Player of the match: Jan Frylinck (Nam)

- Namibia won the toss and elected to bat.

=== 4th ODI ===
30 October 2026
09:30
Scorecard

Ireland; 298/8 (50 overs)	v	Namibia; 168 (41 overs)
Tim Tector 73 (81); JJ Smit 4/34 (10 overs)		Zane Green 45 (58); Jai Moondra 6/26 (10 overs)

Ireland won by 130 runs
Namibia Cricket Ground, Windhoek
Umpires: Ewoud Lassen (Nam) and Jayaraman Madanagopal (Ind)
Player of the match: Jai Moondra (Ire)

- Namibia won the toss and elected to field.
- Tim Tector (Ire) made his ODI debut.
- Jai Moondra (Ire) took his maiden five-wicket haul in ODIs.

=== 5th ODI ===
1 November 2026
09:30
Scorecard

Ireland; 129 (33.1 overs)	v	Namibia; 131/5 (21.2 overs)
Jordan Neill 33 (25); JJ Smit 4/20 (9 overs)		Louren Steenkamp 46 (44); Matthew Humphreys 2/48 (7.2 overs)

Namibia won by 5 wickets
Namibia Cricket Ground, Windhoek
Umpires: Ewoud Lassen (Nam) and Jayaraman Madanagopal (Ind)
Player of the match: JJ Smit (Nam)

- Ireland won the toss and elected to bat.
