= West Indian cricket team in Ireland in 2025 =

International cricket tour

	Ireland	West Indies
- Dates: 21 May – 15 June 2025
Captains	Paul Stirling	Shai Hope

One Day International series
- Results: 3-match series drawn 1–1
Most runs	Andy Balbirnie (115)	Keacy Carty (278)
Most wickets	Barry McCarthy (9)	Jayden Seales (3); Alzarri Joseph (3); Matthew Forde (3)
- Player of the series: Keacy Carty (WI)

Twenty20 International series
- Results: West Indies won the 3-match series 1–0
Most runs	Ross Adair (48)	Evin Lewis (91)
Most wickets	Matthew Humphreys (2)	Akeal Hosein (3)

The West Indies cricket team toured Ireland in May and June 2025 to play the Ireland cricket team. The tour consisted of three One Day International (ODI) and three Twenty20 International (T20I) matches. In March 2025, the Cricket Ireland (CI) confirmed the fixtures for the tour, as a part of the 2025 home international season.

== Squads ==
Ireland		West Indies	
ODIs	T20Is	ODIs	T20Is
Paul Stirling (c); Andrew Balbirnie; ~~Curtis Campher~~; Cade Carmichael; George Dockrell; Stephen Doheny; Matthew Humphreys; Josh Little; Thomas Mayes; Andy McBrine; Barry McCarthy; Liam McCarthy; Jordan Neill; Harry Tector; Lorcan Tucker (wk); ~~Craig Young~~	Paul Stirling (c); Mark Adair; Ross Adair; ~~Curtis Campher~~; ~~Gareth Delany~~; George Dockrell; Stephen Doheny; Gavin Hoey; Matthew Humphreys; Josh Little; Barry McCarthy; Liam McCarthy; Harry Tector; Tim Tector; Lorcan Tucker (wk); Ben White; ~~Craig Young~~	Shai Hope (c, wk); Jewel Andrew (wk); ~~Jediah Blades~~; Keacy Carty; Roston Chase; John Campbell; Matthew Forde; Justin Greaves; Amir Jangoo (wk); Alzarri Joseph; Shamar Joseph; Brandon King; Evin Lewis; Gudakesh Motie; ~~Sherfane Rutherford~~; Jayden Seales; ~~Romario Shepherd~~	Shai Hope (c, wk); Keacy Carty; Johnson Charles; Matthew Forde; Jyd Goolie; Shimron Hetmyer; Jason Holder; Akeal Hosein; Alzarri Joseph; Evin Lewis; Gudakesh Motie; Rovman Powell; Sherfane Rutherford; Romario Shepherd

On 16 May, Sherfane Rutherford and Romario Shepherd withdrew from the ODI squad in order to remain at the 2025 IPL. They were replaced by Jediah Blades and John Campbell. On 19 May, Jediah Blades was ruled out the ODI series due to West Indies A series against South Africa A.

On 19 May, Curtis Campher and Craig Young were ruled out of the ODI series due to finger injury and hamstring injury respectively, with Stephen Doheny and Jordan Neill named as their replacement.

On 5 June, Curtis Campher, Gareth Delany and Craig Young were ruled out of the T20I series due to their injuries, with Stephen Doheny, Gavin Hoey and Tim Tector added as replacements.

== ODI series ==
=== 1st ODI ===
21 May 2025
10:45
Scorecard

Ireland; 303/6 (50 overs)	v	West Indies; 179 (34.1 overs)
Andrew Balbirnie 112 (138); Matthew Forde 3/38 (10 overs)		Roston Chase 55 (76); Barry McCarthy 4/32 (7.1 overs)

Ireland won by 124 runs
Castle Avenue cricket ground, Clontarf
Umpires: Roland Black (Ire) and Richard Illingworth (Eng)
Player of the match: Andrew Balbirnie (Ire)

- West Indies won the toss and elected to field.
- Cade Carmichael, Thomas Mayes and Liam McCarthy (Ire) all made their ODI debuts.
- Paul Stirling became the first Irish cricketer to reach 10,000 international runs across all formats.

=== 2nd ODI ===
23 May 2025
10:45
Scorecard

West Indies; 352/8 (50 overs)	v	Ireland
Keacy Carty 102 (109); Liam McCarthy 3/66 (9 overs)

No result
Castle Avenue cricket ground, Clontarf
Umpires: Richard Illingworth (Eng) and Jonathan Kennedy (Ire)

- Ireland won the toss and elected to field.
- No further play was possible due to rain.
- Matthew Forde (WI) scored the joint-fastest fifty in ODIs (off 16 balls).

=== 3rd ODI ===
25 May 2025
10:45
Scorecard

West Indies; 385/7 (50 overs)	v	Ireland; 165 (29.5 overs)
Keacy Carty 170 (142); Barry McCarthy 3/100 (10 overs)		Cade Carmichael 48 (61); Jayden Seales 3/26 (5.5 overs)

West Indies won by 197 runs (DLS method)
Castle Avenue cricket ground, Clontarf
Umpires: Richard Illingworth (Eng) and Aidan Seaver (Ire)
Player of the match: Keacy Carty (Ire)

- Ireland won the toss and elected to field.
- Ireland were set a revised target of 363 runs in 46 overs due to rain.
- Jordan Neill (Ire) made his ODI debut.
- Barry McCarthy (Ire) conceded the most runs in an innings (100) in ODIs for Ireland going past Peter Connell's record of 95.

== T20I series ==
=== 1st T20I ===
12 June 2025
15:00
Scorecard

Ireland	v	West Indies

Match abandoned
Bready Cricket Club Ground, Bready
Umpires: Roland Black (Ire) and Aidan Seaver (Ire)

- No toss.
- No play was possible due to rain.

=== 2nd T20I ===
14 June 2025
15:00
Scorecard

Ireland	v	West Indies

Match abandoned
Bready Cricket Club Ground, Bready
Umpires: Mark Hawthorne (Ire) and Jonathan Kennedy (Ire)

- No toss.
- No play was possible due to rain.

=== 3rd T20I ===
15 June 2025
15:00
Scorecard

West Indies; 256/5 (20 overs)	v	Ireland; 194/7 (20 overs)
Evin Lewis 91 (44); Matthew Humphreys 2/16 (4 overs)		Ross Adair 48 (36); Akeal Hosein 3/27 (4 overs)

West Indies won by 62 runs
Bready Cricket Club Ground, Bready
Umpires: Roland Black (Ire) and Jonathan Kennedy (Ire)
Player of the match: Evin Lewis (WI)

- Ireland won the toss and elected to field.
- Liam McCarthy (Ire) and Keacy Carty (WI) both made their T20I debuts.
- Liam McCarthy (Ire) set a new record for the most runs (81) conceded in a T20I innings for Ireland, surpassing Barry McCarthy's previous record of 69. This was also the second highest number of runs conceded by a bowler in T20I history.
