= Inter-Provincial Cup =

Cricket tournament in Ireland

- Countries: Ireland and Northern Ireland
- Administrator: Cricket Ireland
- Format: List A (from 2017 onwards)
- First edition: 2013
- Latest edition: 2026
- Next edition: 2027
- Tournament format: Double round-robin
- Number of teams: 3
- Current champion: Leinster Lightning (11th title)
- Most successful: Leinster Lightning (11 titles)
- Most runs: Andrew Balbirnie (1,682)
- Most wickets: George Dockrell (62)
- Website: Cricket Ireland

The Inter-Provincial Cup is a limited-overs cricket tournament in Ireland between the three leading cricketing provinces on the island.

The tournament was held for the first time in 2013 across venues in both Northern Ireland and the Republic of Ireland. Up to and including the 2016 tournament, the matches were not given List A status. However, at an International Cricket Council (ICC) meeting in October 2016, List A status was awarded to all future matches.

== History ==
=== Background ===
The Ireland cricket team enjoyed increasing success at the international level in the late 2000s and into the 2010s which boosted the popularity of the game in the country. They had earned the reputation of a giant killer after upsetting teams like Pakistan and Bangladesh (2007 Cricket World Cup), and England (2011 Cricket World Cup). Their good performances in major international tournaments meant that Cricket Ireland openly started bidding for Test match status to the International Cricket Council.

Nevertheless, one of the main stumbling road blocks for Ireland from getting to play the pinnacle of the game was a lack of a first-class cricket infrastructure at home, among other things. As early as August 2011, Cricket Ireland announced plans of a domestic first-class tournament. In January 2012, Cricket Ireland announced the ambitious 'Vision 2020' plan which announced the establishment of a first-class structure by 2015 and achievement of Test status by 2020. It also began work on a cricket academy to find talented players across the country and improving grass-roots cricket in the country.

For the first time professional contacts, with central, A, B, and C levels were established. Plans for Test status were established partly to stem the flow of their star cricketers moving away to England in hope of playing Test cricket such as Ed Joyce, Eoin Morgan and Boyd Rankin.

According to Richard Holdsworth in an interview with Setanta Sports, Cricket Ireland were pleased with the strategic progress that had been made as of November 2012. In December 2012, Ireland got a $1.5m boost as increased funding from the ICC to establish elite domestic competitions in the country.

== Format ==
The tournament is played in a double round-robin format, with each team playing each other twice, once at home and once away.

=== Points summary ===
Points are scored as follows:

- Win – 4 points
- Tie or no result – 2 points
- Loss – 0 points
- Bonus point – 1 point awarded to a team winning a match with a run rate equal to 1.25 times that of the losing team

== Teams ==
According to Richard Holdsworth's interview to Setanta Sports, three teams would initially participate in the tournament, Leinster cricket team, Northern cricket team and North West cricket team as Munster and Connacht were considered still quite far away from fielding a competitive team for provincial tournaments. They were also given a separate limited overs names much similar to the systems in England and Australia, i.e., like Nottinghamshire Outlaws and South Australia Redbacks. In this case, the names are Leinster Lightning, Northern Knights and North West Warriors.

From the 2021 season, Munster Reds joined the Inter Provincial Cup having previously only competed in the Twenty20 Inter-Provincial Trophy In March 2026, it was announced that Munster Reds will not feature in the 2026 edition following a comprehensive review of the Inter-Provincial competition in late 2025.

Team	First season	Last season	Titles
Leinster Lightning	2013	2026	11
Northern Knights	2013	2026	2
North West Warriors	2013	2026	0
Munster Reds	2021	2025	1

== Competition placings ==
=== 2013 to present ===
Season	Winner	Second	Third	Fourth
2013	Northern Knights	Leinster Lightning	North West Warriors	DNP
2014	Leinster Lightning	Northern Knights	North West Warriors	DNP
2015	Leinster Lightning	Northern Knights	North West Warriors	DNP
2016	Leinster Lightning	Northern Knights	North West Warriors	DNP
2017	Leinster Lightning	North West Warriors	Northern Knights	DNP
2018	Leinster Lightning	North West Warriors	Northern Knights	DNP
2019	Leinster Lightning	Northern Knights	North West Warriors	DNP
2020	Leinster Lightning	Northern Knights	North West Warriors	DNP
2021	Leinster Lightning	North West Warriors	Northern Knights	Munster Reds
2022	Munster Reds	North West Warriors	Leinster Lightning	Northern Knights
2023	Northern Knights	Leinster Lightning	Munster Reds	North West Warriors
2024	Leinster Lightning	Northern Knights	Munster Reds	North West Warriors
2025	Leinster Lightning	Munster Reds	Northern Knights	North West Warriors
2026	Leinster Lightning	North West Warriors	Northern Knights	DNP

DNP - Did Not Participate

== All-time records ==
(All records correct to end of 2026 season)

=== Team records ===
==== Highest innings totals ====
Score	Team	Opps	Venue	Date	Sc
446/6	Leinster Lightning	North West Warriors	Sydney Parade	23 Jul 2026	
425/7	Leinster Lightning	North West Warriors	The Vineyard	14 Aug 2023	
418/8	Leinster Lightning	Northern Knights	Sydney Parade	07 Jul 2026	
414/9	Northern Knights	Leinster Lightning	Sydney Parade	07 Jul 2026	
353/9	Leinster Lightning	Northern Knights	Stormont	5 Sep 2023	

==== Lowest completed innings totals ====
Score	Team	Opps	Venue	Date	Sc
90 ao	Munster Reds	North West Warriors	Mardyke	19 May 2022	
105 ao	North West Warriors	Northern Knights	Stormont	4 May 2015	
119 ao	Munster Reds	Leinster Lightning	Mardyke	8 Aug 2024	
120 ao	North West Warriors	Northern Knights	Lodge Road	26 May 2014	
123 ao	North West Warriors	Leinster Lightning	The Village	1 Jun 2013	
123 ao	Northern Knights	North West Warriors	Bready	12 May 2022	

=== Individual records – batting ===
==== Most career runs ====
Runs	Innings	Player	Team	Average
1682	37	Andrew Balbirnie	Lightning/Warriors	54.25
1408	37	Stephen Doheny	Lightning/Warriors/Reds	39.11
1387	52	Andy McBrine	North West Warriors	28.89
1327	39	Lorcan Tucker	Leinster Lightning	41.46
1183	35	George Dockrell	Leinster Lightning	59.15

==== Highest individual scores ====
Score	Player	For	Opps	Venue	Date	Sc
152	PJ Moor	Munster Reds	Leinster Lightning	Sydney Parade	10 May 2022	
143*	Chris De Freitas	Leinster Lightning	North West Warriors	Oak Hill	15 May 2025	
136	Simi Singh	Leinster Lightning	North West Warriors	New Strabane Park	30 May 2016	
133	Lorcan Tucker	Leinster Lightning	North West Warriors	The Vineyard	14 Aug 2023	
131	Suliman Safi	North West Warriors	Munster Reds	Woodvale Road	20 Aug 2025	

==== Most runs scored in a season ====
Runs	Innings	Player	Team	Season
445	6	Andrew Balbirnie	Leinster Lightning	2025
428	5	Cade Carmichael	Northern Knights	2025
409	5	Stephen Doheny	Leinster Lightning	2026
364	5	George Dockrell	Leinster Lightning	2021
352	5	Suliman Safi	Munster Reds	2025
352	6	Murray Commins	Munster Reds	2021

=== Individual records – bowling ===
==== Most career wickets ====
Wickets	Matches	Player	Team	Average
62	50	George Dockrell	Leinster Lightning	22.69
54	54	Andy McBrine	North West Warriors	30.48
50	42	Tyrone Kane	Lightning/Reds	22.70
47	37	Craig Young	North West Warriors	28.23
46	27	Gavin Hoey	Leinster Lightning	24.13

==== Best bowling in an innings ====
Bowling	Player	Team	Opps	Venue	Date	Sc
6/22	Scott MacBeth	North West Warriors	Munster Reds	Bready	5 Sep 2024	
6/26	Gavin Hoey	Leinster Lightning	Northern Knights	Stormont	5 Sep 2023	
6/39	Barry McCarthy	Leinster Lightning	Munster Reds	Sydney Parade	22 May 2021	
6/42	Tyrone Kane	Leinster Lightning	Northern Knights	Stormont	20 Aug 2019	
5/16	Liam McCarthy	Munster Reds	North West Warriors	Bready	4 Sep 2023	

==== Most wickets in a season ====
Wickets	Average	Player	Team	Season
17	12.23	Gavin Hoey	Leinster Lightning	2024
17	12.58	Barry McCarthy	Leinster Lightning	2021
15	16.46	Liam McCarthy	Munster Reds	2023
15	19.86	Theo van Woerkom	Northern Knights	2023
13	17.15	Josh Manley	Munster Reds	2021

=== Partnership records ===
==== Highest partnerships for each wicket ====
Wicket	P/Ship	Player 1	Player 2	Team	Opps	Venue	Date	Sc
1st	235	Stephen Doheny	Tim Tector	Leinster Lightning	North West Warriors	Sydney Parade	23 Jul 2026	
2nd	240	Andy McBrine	Stephen Doheny	North West Warriors	Northern Knights	Stormont	2 Jun 2022	
3rd	212	Lorcan Tucker	Harry Tector	Leinster Lightning	Munster Reds	Oak Hill	7 May 2025	
4th	157	Tyrone Kane	PJ Moor	Munster Reds	Leinster Lightning	Sydney Parade	18 May 2023	
5th	187	Andrew Balbirnie	Kevin O'Brien	Leinster Lightning	North West Warriors	The Vineyard	3 May 2014	
6th	121	Scott MacBeth	Graham Hume	North West Warriors	Munster Reds	Bready	5 Sep 2024	
7th	215*	Simi Singh	George Dockrell	Leinster Lightning	Northern Knights	The Vineyard	4 Jun 2018	
8th	103	Tyrone Kane	Lorcan Tucker	Leinster Lightning	North West Warriors	Observatory Lane	9 Sep 2018	
9th	72	Shane Getkate	Jacob Mulder	Northern Knights	Leinster Lightning	Observatory Lane	31 Jul 2016	
10th	69	Craig Young	Andrew Britton	North West Warriors	Northern Knights	La Manga	24 Apr 2019	

== See also ==
- Cricket in Ireland
- History of cricket
- Inter-Provincial Championship
- Inter-Provincial Trophy
