= 2024 Inter-Provincial Cup =

Cricket tournament

- Dates: 9 May – 11 September
- Administrator: Cricket Ireland
- Cricket format: List A
- Tournament format: Double round-robin
- Host: Ireland
- Champions: Leinster Lightning (9th title)
- Runners-up: Northern Knights
- Participants: 4
- Matches: 12
- Most runs: Benjamin Calitz (Northern Knights) (203)
- Most wickets: Gavin Hoey (Leinster Lightning) (17)

The 2024 Inter-Provincial Cup was the twelfth edition of the Inter-Provincial Cup, a List A cricket competition in Ireland. The tournament began on 9 May 2024 and the last match was held on 11 September 2024. Four provincial teams took part in the tournament. In April 2024 Cricket Ireland confirmed the fixtures for the competition.

== Points table ==
Pos	Team	Pld	W	L	T	NR	Pts	NRR
1	Leinster Lightning	6	3	2	0	1	16	0.956
2	Northern Knights	6	3	2	0	1	17	0.719
3	Munster Reds	6	3	3	0	0	13	−0.537
4	North West Warriors	6	1	3	0	2	9	−0.990

Source: ESPNcricinfo Cricket Ireland

== Fixtures ==
9 May 2024
11:00
Scorecard

Northern Knights; 244 (48.4 overs)	v	North West Warriors; 126 (34 overs)
Ruhan Pretorius 81 (100); Harry Zimmermann 3/40 (6.4 overs)		Shane Getkate 66* (74); Matthew Foster 3/12 (4 overs)

Northern Knights won by 118 runs
Stormont, Belfast
Umpires: Azam Baig and Gareth Morrison
Player of the match: Ruhan Pretorius (Northern Knights)

- North West Warriors won the toss and elected to field.
- Ben Calitz, Sam Topping, Harry Dyer (Northern Knights), Gavin Roulston and Kian Hilton (North West Warriors) all made their List A debut.
- Points: Northern Knights 5, North West Warriors 0.

15 May 2024
11:00
Scorecard

Leinster Lightning; 173 (41.2 overs)	v	Munster Reds; 176/6 (31 overs)
David Delany 44 (58); Josh Manley 4/57 (10 overs)		Oliver Metcalfe 49 (58); Gavin Hoey 3/49 (10 overs)

Munster Reds won by 4 wickets
Sydney Parade, Sandymount
Umpires: Roland Black and Mark Hawthorne
Player of the match: Josh Manley (Munster Reds)

- Munster Reds won the toss and elected to field.
- Swapnil Modgil, Philippus le Roux (Leinster Lightning), Zubair Khan, Oliver Metcalfe and Jordan Neill (Munster Reds) all made their List A debut.
- Points: Munster Reds 5, Leinster Lightning 0.

22 May 2024
11:00
Scorecard

North West Warriors; 227 (41.4 overs)	v	Leinster Lightning; 49/1 (9 overs)
Shane Getkate 81 (79); Gavin Hoey 4/45 (10 overs)		Tim Tector 24 (20)

No result
Bready Cricket Club Ground, Magheramason
Umpires: Mark Hawthorne and Gareth Morrison

- Leinster Lightning won the toss and elected to field.
- No further play was possible due to rain.
- Jack Lalor and Dylan Lues (Leinster Lightning) both made their List A debut.
- Points: Leinster Lightning 2, North West Warriors 2.

29 May 2024
11:00
Scorecard

Northern Knights; 279/7 (43 overs)	v	Munster Reds; 138 (23.5 overs)
Ben Calitz 104* (85); Brandon Kruger 3/39 (9 overs)		Liam McCarthy 46 (18); Cian Robertson 4/39 (5 overs)

Northern Knights won by 81 runs (DLS method)
Stormont, Belfast
Umpires: Roland Black and Aidan Seaver
Player of the match: Ben Calitz (Northern Knights)

- Munster Reds won the toss and elected to field.
- The match was reduced to 43 overs per side due to rain.
- Munster Reds were set a revised target of 220 runs from 27 overs due to rain.
- Jack Dickson (Munster Reds) made his List A debut.
- Ben Calitz (Northern Knights) scored his first century in List A cricket.
- Poinst: Northern Knights 5, Munster Reds 0.

5 June 2024
11:00
Scorecard

North West Warriors; 231 (49 overs)	v	Munster Reds; 232/8 (49.2 overs)
Marcello Piedt 59 (53); Josh Manley 3/26 (10 overs)		Mark Andrianatos 60* (83); Andy McBrine 2/30 (10 overs)

Munster Reds won by 2 wickets
Oak Hill Cricket Club Ground, County Wicklow
Umpires: Jonathan Kennedy and Aidan Seaver

- North West Warriors won the toss and elected to bat.
- Points: Munster Reds 5, North West Warriors 0.

5 June 2024
11:00
Scorecard

Leinster Lightning; 132 (35.3 overs)	v	Northern Knights; 131/2 (20.2 overs)
Gavin Hoey 39 (56); Ruhan Pretorius 4/30 (10 overs)		Jason van der Merwe 53 (36); Amish Sidhu 1/27 (6 overs)

Northern Knights won by 8 wickets
Stormont, Belfast
Umpires: Roland Black and Mark Hawthorne

- Leinster Lightning won the toss and elected to bat.
- The match was reduced to 47 overs per side due to rain.
- Northern Knights were set a revised target of 130 runs from 47 overs due to rain.
- Monil Patel (Leinster Lightning) and Jason van der Merwe (Northern Knights) both made their List A debut.
- Points: Northern Knights 5, Leinster Lightning 0.

8 August 2024
11:00
Scorecard

Leinster Lightning; 242 (44.3 overs)	v	Munster Reds; 119 (26.1 overs)
Christopher De Freitas 45 (57); Peter Francis 4/43 (8.3 overs)		Liam McCarthy 19 (18); Gavin Hoey 3/18 (5.1 overs)

Leinster Lightning won by 123 runs
Richard Beamish Cricket Grounds, Mardyke
Umpires: Jonathan Kennedy and Gareth Morrison
Player of the match: Fionn Hand (Leinster Lightning)

- Munster Reds won the toss and elected to field.
- Peter Francis (Munster Reds) and John McNally (Leinster Lightining) both made their List A debut.
- Points: Leinster Lightning 5, Munster Reds 0.

15 August 2024
11:00
Scorecard

Northern Knights	v	North West Warriors

Match abandoned
Woodvale Road, Eglinton

- No toss
- No play was possible due to rain.
- Points: Northern Knights 2, North-West Warriors 2.

22 August 2024
11:00
Scorecard

Northern Knights; 174 (32.4 overs)	v	Munster Reds; 176/7 (42.1 overs)
Ben Calitz 96 (87); Liam McCarthy 5/31 (9.4 overs)		Mark Andrianatos 59 (122); Ross Adair 3/4 (2 overs)

Munster Reds won by 3 wickets
Richard Beamish Cricket Grounds, Mardyke
Umpires: Jonathan Kennedy and Gareth Morrison
Player of the match: Liam McCarthy (Munster Reds)

- Munster Reds won the toss and elected to field.
- Adam Kennedy (Northern Knights) made his List A debut.
- Points: Munster Reds 4, Northern Knights 0

29 August 2024
11:00
Scorecard

North West Warriors; 128 (34 overs)	v	Leinster Lightning; 132/4 (21.2 overs)
Stephen Doheny 30 (31); Gavin Hoey 4/30 (10 overs)		Andrew Balbirnie 57* (75); Scott MacBeth 2/19 (3 overs)

Leinster Lightning won by 6 wickets
Sydney Parade, Dublin
Umpires: Mark Hawthorne and Aidan Seaver
Player of the match: Gavin Hoey (Leinster Lightning)

- North West Warriors won the toss and elected to bat.
- David O'Sullivan (North West Warriors) made his List A debut.
- Points: Leinster Lightning 5, North West Warriors 0.

5 September 2024
11:00
Scorecard

North West Warriors; 292/8 (50 overs)	v	Munster Reds; 224 (36.1 overs)
Graham Hume 79* (91); Michael Frost 3/44 (10 overs)		PJ Moor 130 (90); Scott MacBeth 6/22 (4.1 overs)

North West Warriors won by 68 runs
Bready Cricket Club Ground, Magheramason
Umpires: Mark Hawthorne and Gareth Morrison
Player of the match: Scott MacBeth (North West Warriors)

- North West Warriors won the toss and elected to bat.
- Scott MacBeth (North West Warriors) took his first five-wicket haul in List A cricket.
- Points: North West Warriors 5, Munster Reds 0

11 September 2024
11:00
Scorecard

Northern Knights; 154 (25 overs)	v	Leinster Lightning; 157/1 (17.3 overs)
Ross Adair 57 (24); Fionn Hand 4/59 (8 overs)		Andrew Balbirnie 75* (49)

Leinster Lightning won by 9 wickets
Oak Hill Cricket Club Ground, County Wicklow
Umpires: Azam Baig and Aidan Seaver
Player of the match: Andrew Balbirnie (Leinster Lightning)

- Northern Knights won the toss and elected to bat.
- Aditya Adey (Northern Knights), Melvin Deveraj and Sam Willemse (Leinster Lightning) all made their List A debuts.
- Points: Leinster Lightning 5, Northern Knights 0
