= 2022 Inter-Provincial Trophy =

Cricket tournament

- Dates: 27 May – 29 July 2022
- Administrator: Cricket Ireland
- Cricket format: Twenty20
- Tournament format: Round-robin
- Champions: Leinster Lightning (7th title)
- Participants: 4
- Matches: 18
- Most runs: 294 Stephen Doheny (North West Warriors)
- Most wickets: 12 Curtis Campher (Munster Reds)

The 2022 Inter-Provincial Trophy was the tenth edition of the Inter-Provincial Trophy, a Twenty20 cricket competition being played in Ireland in 2022. It was the sixth edition of the competition to be played with full Twenty20 status. The tournament was played as a series of three-day festivals between four teams, with the fixtures being confirmed by Cricket Ireland on 4 March 2022. North West Warriors were the defending champions, having won the 2021 competition. After a strong start to the competition by Munster Reds, which saw them top of the table going into the final festival at Sydney Parade in July, they were eventually beaten to the title on net run rate by Leinster Lightning, which was their 7th Inter-Provincial Trophy.

== Points table ==
Team	Pld	W	L	T	NR	NRR	Pts
Leinster Lightning	9	4	2	1	2	1.720	25
Munster Reds	9	4	2	1	2	0.993	25
North West Warriors	9	3	4	0	2	-2.030	16
Northern Knights	9	2	5	0	2	-0.585	13

== Fixtures ==
=== Round one ===
27 May 2022
Scorecard

Northern Knights; 149/8 (20 overs)	v	North West Warriors; 152/3 (16.3 overs)
Ruhan Pretorius 40 (34); Graham Hume 3/29 (4 overs)		Stephen Doheny 74* (49); Josh Manley 1/16 (2.3 overs)

North West Warriors won by 7 wickets
The Green, Comber
Umpires: Mark Hawthorne and Paul Nicholls
Player of the match: Stephen Doheny (North West Warriors)

- North West Warriors won the toss and elected to field.
- Matthew Humphreys, Max Burton (Northern Knights) and Trent McKeegan (North West Warriors) all made their T20 debuts.
- Points: North West Warriors 4, Northern Knights 0.

27 May 2022
Scorecard

Leinster Lightning; 188/6 (20 overs)	v	Munster Reds; 190/4 (14.4 overs)
Tim Tector 62* (44); Curtis Campher 3/49 (4 overs)		Kevin O'Brien 64* (27); Jack Carty 2/13 (2 overs)

Munster Reds won by 6 wickets
The Green, Comber
Umpires: Mark Hawthorne and Paul Nicholls
Player of the match: Tyrone Kane (Munster Reds)

- Munster Reds won the toss and elected to field.
- Mikey O'Reilly (Leinster Lightning) made his T20 debut.
- Points: Munster Reds 5, Leinster Lightning 0.

28 May 2022
Scorecard

North West Warriors; 159/5 (20 overs)	v	Leinster Lightning; 158 (19.4 overs)
Stephen Doheny 46 (34); Gavin Hoey 3/30 (3 overs)		Lorcan Tucker 44 (32); Graham Kennedy 3/30 (4 overs)

North West Warriors won by 1 run
The Green, Comber
Umpires: Paul Nicholls and Roland Black
Player of the match: Graham Hume (North West Warriors)

- Leinster Lightning won the toss and elected to field.
- Points: North West Warriors 4, Leinster Lightning 0.

28 May 2022
Scorecard

Northern Knights; 108 (18.1 overs)	v	Munster Reds; 110/7 (16.2 overs)
Morgan Topping 27 (23); Gareth Delany 3/10 (3 overs)		Gareth Delany 22 (12); Josh Manley 4/23 (4 overs)

Munster Reds won by 3 wickets
The Green, Comber
Umpires: Paul Nicholls and Roland Black
Player of the match: Fionn Hand (Munster Reds)

- Munster Reds won the toss and elected to field.
- Points: Munster Reds 4, Northern Knights 0.

29 May 2022
Scorecard

Munster Reds; 206/5 (20 overs)	v	North West Warriors; 106 (17.4 overs)
Tyrone Kane 53* (27); Conor Olphert 2/34 (4 overs)		Jared Wilson 72* (46); Gareth Delany 2/8 (3 overs)

Munster Reds won by 100 runs
The Green, Comber
Umpires: Jareth McCready and Paul Nicholls
Player of the match: Gareth Delany (Munster Reds)

- North West Warriors won the toss and elected to field.
- Points: Munster Reds 5, North West Warriors 0.

29 May 2022
Scorecard

Leinster Lightning; 176 (20 overs)	v	Northern Knights; 137 (17.5 overs)
Andrew Balbirnie 58 (34); Mark Adair 3/40 (4 overs)		Jeremy Lawlor 19 (9); Simi Singh 4/21 (3.5 overs)

Leinster Lightning won by 39 runs
The Green, Comber
Umpires: Jareth McCready and Paul Nicholls
Player of the match: Simi Singh (Leinster Lightning)

- Northern Knights won the toss and elected to field.
- Points: Leinster Lightning 5, Northern Knights 0.

=== Round two ===
10 June 2022
Scorecard

Northern Knights; 148/7 (20 overs)	v	North West Warriors; 111/4 (13.1 overs)
James McCollum 49 (44); Andy McBrine 2/22 (4 overs)		Shane Getkate 46* (26); Josh Manley 3/35 (2 overs)

North West Warriors won by 6 wickets (DLS method)
Bready Cricket Club Ground, Magheramason
Umpires: Mark Hawthorne and Jareth McCready
Player of the match: Shane Getkate (North West Warriors)

- North West Warriors won the toss and elected to field.
- North West Warriors were set a revised target of 109 runs from 14 overs due to rain.
- Cade Carmichael (Northern Knights) made his Twenty20 debut.
- Points: North West Warriors 4, Northern Knights 0

10 June 2022
Scorecard

Leinster Lightning; 149/8 (18 overs)	v	Munster Reds; 137/6 (16 overs)
Gavin Hoey 39 (26); Gareth Delany 2/18 (4 overs)		Peter Moor 40 (32); Gavin Hoey 2/24 (4 overs)

Match tied (DLS method)
Bready Cricket Club Ground, Magheramason
Umpires: Mark Hawthorne and Jareth McCready
Player of the match: Gareth Hoey (Leinster Lightning)

- Munster Reds won the toss and elected to field.
- Leinster Lightnings innings reduced to 18 overs due to rain. Munster Reds were set a revised target of 138 runs from 16 overs due to rain.
- * Points: Leinster Lightning 2, Munster Reds 2

11 June 2022
Scorecard

Leinster Lightning	v	Northern Knights

Match abandoned without a ball bowled
Bready Cricket Club Ground, Magheramason
Umpires: Mark Hawthorne and Roly Black

- No toss made
- * Points: Leinster Lightning 2, Northern Knights 2

11 June 2022
Scorecard

North West Warriors	v	Munster Reds

Match abandoned without a ball bowled
Bready Cricket Club Ground, Magheramason
Umpires: Mark Hawthorne and Roly Black

- No toss made
- * Points: North West Warriors 2, Munster Reds 2

12 June 2022
Scorecard

Northern Knights	v	Munster Reds

Match abandoned without a ball bowled
Bready Cricket Club Ground, Magheramason
Umpires: Roly Black and Aidan Seaver

- No toss made
- * Points: Northern Knights 2, Munster Reds 2

12 June 2022
Scorecard

North West Warriors	v	Leinster Lightning

Match abandoned without a ball bowled
Bready Cricket Club Ground, Magheramason
Umpires: Roly Black and Aidan Seaver

- No toss made
- * Points: North West Warrior 2, Leinster Lightning 2

=== Round three ===
27 July 2022
Scorecard

Munster Reds; 219/5 (20 overs)	v	Leinster Lightning; 221/5 (18.3 overs)
Murray Commins 102 (61); Barry McCarthy 2/44 (4 overs)		George Dockrell 68* (18); Mike Frost 2/38 (4 overs)

Leinster Lightning won by 5 wickets
Sydney Parade, Dublin
Umpires: Mark Hawthorne and Paul Reynolds
Player of the match: George Dockrell (Leinster Lightning)

- Leinster Lightning won the toss and elected to field.
- Points: Leinster Lightning 4, Munster Reds 0

27 July 2022
Scorecard

North West Warriors; 204/8 (20 overs)	v	Northern Knights; 205/6 (17.4 overs)
Nathan McGuire 71 (35); Thomas Mayes 2/30 (4 overs)		Ross Adair 111 (49); Andy McBrine 2/35 (4 overs)

Northern Knights won by 4 wickets
Sydney Parade, Dublin
Umpires: Mark Hawthorne and Paul Reynolds
Player of the match: Ross Adair (Northern Knights)

- North West Warriors won the toss and elected to bat.
- Dharm Singh and Scott Macbeth (North West Warriors) both made their Twenty20 debuts.
- Points: Northern Knights 4, North West Warriors 0

28 July 2022
Scorecard

Northern Knights; 228/4 (20 overs)	v	Munster Reds; 129 all out (13.2 overs)
John Matchett 83 (46); Curtis Campher 1/36 (4 overs)		Fionn Hand 28 (11); Mark Adair 3/15 (2.2 overs)

Northern Knights won by 99 runs
Sydney Parade, Dublin
Umpires: Paul Reynolds and Roly Black
Player of the match: John Matchett (Northern Knights)

- Munster Reds won the toss and elected to field.
- Brandon Kruger (Munster Reds) made his Twenty20 debut.
- Points: Northern Knights 5, Munster Reds 0

28 July 2022
Scorecard

Leinster Lightning; 260/3 (20 overs)	v	North West Warriors; 132 all out (17.5 overs)
Lorcan Tucker 77 (33); Andy McBrine 2/34 (4 overs)		Stephen Doheny 26 (22); Josh Little 3/12 (4 overs)

Leinster Lightning won by 128 runs
Sydney Parade, Dublin
Umpires: Paul Reynolds and Roly Black
Player of the match: Lorcan Tucker (Leinster Lightning)

- North West Warriors won the toss and elected to field.
- * Points: Leinster Lightning 5, North West Warriors 0

29 July 2022
Scorecard

North West Warriors; 165/8 (20 overs)	v	Munster Reds; 168/4 (14.1 overs)
Stephen Doheny 58 (42); David Delany 3/17 (4 overs)		Peter Moor 74 (30); Scott MacBeth 3/24 (2.1 overs)

Munster Reds won by 6 wickets
Sydney Parade, Dublin
Umpires: Jareth McCready and Roly Black
Player of the match: David Delany (Munster Reds)

- North West Warriors won the toss and elected to bat first.
- * Points: Munster Reds 5, North West Warriors 0

29 July 2022
Scorecard

Northern Knights; 96 all out (14.4 overs)	v	Leinster Lightning; 97/4 (10.2 overs)
Cade Carmichael 26 (23); Barry McCarthy 4/18 (3.4 overs)		Andy Balbirnie 52 (24); Mark Adair 2/25 (3 overs)

Leinster Lightning won by 6 wickets
Sydney Parade, Dublin
Umpires: Jareth McCready and Roly Black
Player of the match: Barry McCarthy (Leinster Lightning)

- Northern Knights won the toss and elected to bat.
- Points: Leinster Lightning 5, Northern Knights 0
- Series: Leinster Lightning won the 2022 Inter-Provincial Trophy
