= 2025 United Arab Emirates Tri-Nation Series (List A) =

- Date: 13–25 April 2025
- Location: United Arab Emirates
- Result: Sri Lanka A won the series
Teams
Afghanistan A	Ireland Wolves	Sri Lanka A
Captains
Darwish Rasooli	Gavin Hoey	Sadeera Samarawickrama
Most runs
Darwish Rasooli (264)	Cade Carmichael (151)	Sadeera Samarawickrama (197)
Most wickets
Qais Ahmad (7)	Thomas Mayes (10)	Tharindu Rathnayake (13)

2025 United Arab Emirates Tri-Nation Series was a cricket tournament held in the United Arab Emirates in April 2025. It was a tri-nation series involving Afghanistan A, Ireland Wolves and Sri Lanka A, with the matches played in limited overs format. The series took place from 13 to 25 April 2025 in Abu Dhabi. The Afghanistan Cricket Board (ACB) organized the tournament. In February 2025, the Sri Lanka Cricket (SLC) announced the schedule of the matches involving Sri Lanka.

== Afghanistan A v Ireland Wolves series ==
Before the start of the Tri-series Afghanistan A and Ireland Wolves were played one-off first-class match from 7–10 April in Tolerance Oval, Abu Dhabi.

=== Only Unofficial Test ===
7–10 April 2025
Scorecard

Afghanistan A	v	Ireland Wolves
612/7d (151 overs); Bahir Shah 187 (274); Liam McCarthy 2/88 (23 overs)		309 (94 overs); Cade Carmichael 124 (177); Zia-ur-Rehman 4/53 (29 overs)
		109 (54.2 overs) (f/o); Thomas Mayes 29 (63); Arab Gul 6/25 (16 overs)

Afghanistan A won by an innings and 194 runs
Tolerance Oval, Abu Dhabi
Umpires: Farooq Khan (Afg) and Muhammad Sabir (Afg)
Player of the match: Arab Gul (Afghanistan A)

- Afghanistan A won the toss and elected to bat.
- Ben Calitz, Cian Robertson and Sam Topping (Ireland Wolves) all made their first-class debuts.
- Cade Carmichael (Ireland Wolves) scored his first century in first-class cricket.
- Fareed Ahmad (Afghanistan A) took his 100th wicket in first-class cricket.

== List A Tri-Nation series ==
=== Points table ===
Pos	Team	Pld	W	L	NR	Pts	NRR	Qualification
1	Sri Lanka A	4	4	0	0	8	1.514	Advanced to the final
2	Ireland Wolves	4	1	3	0	2	−0.652	Advanced to the final
3	Afghanistan A (H)	4	1	3	0	2	−0.933	

Source: Cricbuzz
(H) Host

=== Round-robin ===
13 April 2025
10:00
Scorecard

Sri Lanka A 264 (49.3 overs)	v	Ireland Wolves; 219 (44.5 overs)
Sahan Arachchige 78 (96); Thomas Mayes 3/40 (9.3 overs)		Sam Topping 39 (52); Tharindu Rathnayake 4/24 (8.5 overs)

Sri Lanka A won by 45 runs
Sheikh Zayed Cricket Stadium, Abu Dhabi
Umpires: Muhammad Sabir (Afg) and Ajmal Shamolzi (Afg)
Player of the match: Sahan Arachchige (Sri Lanka A)

- Ireland Wolves won the toss and elected to field.

15 April 2025
10:00
Scorecard

Afghanistan A 248/8 (50 overs)	v	Sri Lanka A 249/4 (41.3 overs)
Darwish Rasooli 155 (147); Dilshan Madushanka 4/37 (10 overs)		Sadeera Samarawickrama 129* (110); Khalil Ahmed 2/51 (7 overs)

Sri Lanka A won by 6 wickets
Sheikh Zayed Cricket Stadium, Abu Dhabi
Umpires: Farooq Khan (Afg) and Ajmal Shamolzi (Afg)
Player of the match: Sadeera Samarawickrama (Sri Lanka A)

- Afghanistan A won the toss and elected to bat.

17 April 2025
10:00
Scorecard

Ireland Wolves; 203 (41.1 overs)	v	Afghanistan A 207/3 (33.1 overs)
Christopher De Freitas 64 (81); Qais Ahmad 3/34 (8 overs)		Zubaid Akbari 76 (84); Thomas Mayes 1/24 (7 overs)

Afghanistan A won by 7 wickets
Sheikh Zayed Cricket Stadium, Abu Dhabi
Umpires: Farooq Khan (Afg) and Muhammad Sabir (Afg)
Player of the match: Qais Ahmad (Afghanistan A)

- Afghanistan A won the toss and elected to field.

19 April 2025
10:00
Scorecard

Ireland Wolves; 192 (46 overs)	v	Sri Lanka A 193/4 (27.1 overs)
Christopher De Freitas 67* (97); Dilshan Madushanka 4/44 (8 overs)		Lasith Croospulle 53 (33); Gavin Hoey 3/47 (9 overs)

Sri Lanka A won by 6 wickets
Sheikh Zayed Cricket Stadium, Abu Dhabi
Umpires: Muhammad Sabir (Afg) and Ajmal Shamolzi (Afg)
Player of the match: Dilshan Madushanka (Sri Lanka A)

- Ireland Wolves won the toss and elected to bat.

21 April 2025
10:00
Scorecard

Afghanistan A 172 (35.3 overs)	v	Ireland Wolves; 173/4 (22.3 overs)
Sediqullah Atal 75 (93); Gavin Hoey 4/28 (8.3 overs)		Cade Carmichael 75* (63); Sharafuddin Ashraf 2/23 (5 overs)

Ireland Wolves won by 6 wickets
Sheikh Zayed Cricket Stadium, Abu Dhabi
Umpires: Farooq Khan (Afg) and Ajmal Shamolzi (Afg)

- Afghanistan A won the toss and elected to bat.

23 April 2025
10:00
Scorecard

Afghanistan A 228/8 (50 overs)	v	Sri Lanka A 232/6 (50 overs)
Darwish Rasooli 76 (77); Tharindu Rathnayake 4/45 (10 overs)		Kamil Mishara 81 (72); Qais Ahmad 3/40 (10 overs)

Sri Lanka A won by 4 wickets
Sheikh Zayed Cricket Stadium, Abu Dhabi
Umpires: Muhammad Sabir (Afg) and Ajmal Shamolzi (Afg)
Player of the match: Tharindu Rathnayake (Sri Lanka A)

- Sri Lanka A won the toss and elected to field.

=== Final ===
25 April 2025
10:00
Scorecard

Ireland Wolves; 200 (47.3 overs)	v	Sri Lanka A 203/5 (34.3 overs)
Morgan Topping 73 (101); Tharindu Rathnayake 4/33 (10 overs)		Pavan Rathnayake 77* (76); Thomas Mayes 3/38 (7 overs)

Sri Lanka A won by 5 wickets
Sheikh Zayed Cricket Stadium, Abu Dhabi
Umpires: Farooq Khan (Afg) and Muhammad Sabir (Afg)
Player of the match: Milan Rathnayake (Sri Lanka A)

- Sri Lanka A won the toss and elected to field.

== Afghanistan A v Sri Lanka A series ==
After the completion of the Tri-series Afghanistan A played Sri Lanka A for one-off first-class match from 29 April–2 May in Abu Dhabi.

=== Only Unofficial Test ===
29 April–2 May 2025
Scorecard

Sri Lanka A	v	Afghanistan A
406 (100.2 overs); Lahiru Udara 107 (138); Bashir Ahmad 4/77 (26 overs)		168 (46.5 overs); Afsar Zazai 54 (107); Isitha Wijesundara 6/35 (11 overs)
376/4d (79 overs); Nuwanidu Fernando 102 (123); Ziaur Rahman 1/44 (12 overs)		306 (106 overs); Darwish Rasooli 121 (241); Isitha Wijesundara 4/75 (16 overs)

Sri Lanka A won by 308 runs
Tolerance Oval, Abu Dhabi
Umpires: Farooq Khan (Afg) and Ajmal Shamolzi (Afg)
Player of the match: Isitha Wijesundara (Sri Lanka A)

- Sri Lanka A won the toss and elected to bat.
