= Irish cricket team in England in 2023 =

International cricket tour

Ireland men's cricket team in England in 2023
| | England | Ireland |
- Dates: 1 June – 26 September 2023
| Captains | Ben Stokes (Test); Zak Crawley (ODIs) | Andrew Balbirnie (Test); Paul Stirling (ODIs) |

Test series
- Result: England won the 1-match series 1–0
| Most runs | Ollie Pope (205) | Andrew McBrine (105) |
| Most wickets | Stuart Broad (6) | Andrew McBrine (2) |

One Day International series
- Results: England won the 3-match series 1–0
| Most runs | Ben Duckett (155) | George Dockrell (43) |
| Most wickets | Rehan Ahmed (4) | Craig Young (5) |

The Ireland men's cricket toured England in June 2023 to play one four-day Test match and toured again in September 2023 for three One Day International (ODI) matches.

On 1 June 2023, the England team bus was briefly halted by Just Stop Oil protestors on the way to Lord's. England wicket-keeper Jonny Bairstow shared images of the protest on his Instagram page. England won the only Test match of the series.

== Squads ==
| England | | Ireland | |
| Test | ODIs | Test | ODIs |
|---|---|---|---|
| Ben Stokes (c); Ollie Pope (vc, wk); ~~James Anderson~~; Jonny Bairstow (wk); Stuart Broad; Harry Brook; Zak Crawley; Ben Duckett (wk); Dan Lawrence; Jack Leach; Matthew Potts; ~~Ollie Robinson~~; Joe Root; Josh Tongue; Chris Woakes; Mark Wood | Zak Crawley (c); Ben Duckett (vc, wk); Rehan Ahmed; ~~Harry Brook~~; Brydon Carse; Sam Hain; Tom Hartley; Will Jacks; Tom Kohler-Cadmore; ~~Craig Overton~~; Matthew Potts; Joe Root; Phil Salt (wk); George Scrimshaw; Jamie Smith (wk); Luke Wood | Andrew Balbirnie (c); Mark Adair; Curtis Campher; George Dockrell; Matthew Foster; Fionn Hand; Graham Hume; Thomas Mayes; Andrew McBrine; James McCollum; PJ Moor (wk); ~~Conor Olphert~~; Paul Stirling; Harry Tector; Lorcan Tucker (wk); Craig Young | Paul Stirling (c); Mark Adair; Andrew Balbirnie; Curtis Campher; Gareth Delany; George Dockrell; Graham Hume; Josh Little; Andrew McBrine; Barry McCarthy; Neil Rock (wk); Harry Tector; Lorcan Tucker (wk); Theo van Woerkom; Craig Young |

Matthew Foster was named in Ireland's Test squad as a replacement for Conor Olphert, who was ruled out due to knee injury. Before the Test match, Josh Tongue was added to England's squad as an injury cover. On 29 May 2023, injured James Anderson and Ollie Robinson were ruled out of England's Test squad. Tom Hartley replaced the injured Craig Overton in England's ODI squad. Joe Root was added to the England squad for the first ODI in a bid to improve his form ahead of the 2023 Cricket World Cup. Harry Brook was withdrawn from the ODI series after replacing Jason Roy in England's squad for the World Cup. After the first ODI was abandoned due to rain, Jason Roy turned down the opportunity to join the squad and England instead added Tom Kohler-Cadmore.

== Tour match ==
As a warm-up to the Test match, Ireland played a three-day first-class match against Essex.

26–28 May 2023
Scorecard

| Essex | v | Ireland |
| 343 (71.5 overs); Robin Das 132 (118); Thomas Mayes 4/68 (12.5 overs) | | 419 (87.5 overs); Paul Stirling 107 (151); Jamal Richards 5/96 (19 overs) |
| 307/8d (53 overs); Mark Adair 85 (66); Graham Hume 3/50 (13 overs) | | 232/0 (42.4 overs); PJ Moor 118* (126) |

Ireland won by 10 wickets
County Cricket Ground, Chelmsford
Umpires: Roland Black (Ire) and Rob White (Eng)

- Ireland won the toss and elected to field.
- Robin Das, Eshun Kalley, Jamal Richards, Noah Thain (Essex) and Thomas Mayes (Ire) all made their first-class debuts.
- Robin Das (Essex) scored his first hundred in first-class cricket.
- Jamal Richards (Essex) took his first five-wicket haul in first-class cricket.

== Only Test ==
1–3 June 2023
Scorecard

| Ireland | v | England |
| 172 (56.2 overs); James McCollum 36 (108); Stuart Broad 5/51 (17 overs) | | 524/4d (82.4 overs); Ollie Pope 205 (208); Andy McBrine 2/99 (13.4 overs) |
| 362 (86.2 overs); Mark Adair 88 (76); Josh Tongue 5/66 (21 overs) | | 12/0 (0.4 overs); Zak Crawley 12* (4) |

England won by 10 wickets
Lord's, London
Umpires: Adrian Holdstock (SA) and Paul Wilson (Aus)
Player of the match: Ollie Pope (Eng)

- England won the toss and elected to field.
- Fionn Hand (Ire) and Josh Tongue (Eng) both made their Test debuts.
- Joe Root (Eng) became the fastest batter to reach 11,000 Test runs in terms of matches, reaching the mark in his 130th game for England.
- England's first innings score was made at 6.33 runs per over, the second highest run rate for a score of 500 or more in Test cricket.

=== Day 1 ===
England won the toss and decided to field first, taking advantage of the overcast weather. Their strategy paid off as they secured an early wicket when Stuart Broad trapped PJ Moor lbw. Broad went on to dismiss the entire Ireland top order, leaving the visitors in a difficult position as they approached the lunch break. By the third session, Ireland's innings came to an end with a total score of 172; Broad completed a five-wicket haul when he bowled Mark Adair, and he was supported by three wickets from Jack Leach and two from Matthew Potts. England's momentum carried over to their batting, and despite having only 25 overs to play on the first day, they managed to narrow the gap to just 20 runs. Fionn Hand made an impact by claiming his first test wicket, catching Zak Crawley off his own bowling right after Crawley reached his half-century.

=== Day 2 ===
England maintained their dominant batting performance, eventually declaring their innings at 524 after the dismissal of Ollie Pope. Ben Duckett scored 182 runs off just 178 balls, while Pope contributed 205 runs off just 208 deliveries, taking the English team to a lead of 352. The bowling side struggled to contain the flow of runs, allowing the English batsmen to score at an impressive run rate of 6.33. Graham Hume managed to dismiss Duckett, while Andy McBrine claimed the wickets of Pope and Joe Root. Pope achieved several milestones during his innings, surpassing 2,000 Test runs, achieving a personal best score, and recording the fastest double-century in England.

With 30 overs remaining in the day, England's focus switched to the possibility of securing an innings victory. The Irish batters had a shaky start to their second innings, mirroring their performance in the first. Josh Tongue took his maiden Test wicket when PJ Moor was again trapped lbw, before getting Andy Balbirnie out, caught by Jonny Bairstow, in the same over. James McCollum suffered an ankle injury from a short ball by Tongue and had to retire hurt. Additionally, Paul Stirling fell victim to a leg-side catch, resulting in Tongue finishing the day with three wickets. Those were the only wickets to fall as Ireland finished the day on 97 runs, trailing by 255 runs with Harry Tector and Lorcan Tucker at the crease.

=== Day 3 ===
On Day 3, Tector, Adair and McBrine all reached half-centuries; Adair scored particularly quickly, making 88 runs off 76 balls as part of a partnership of 163 runs with McBrine, who finished the innings unbeaten on 86. McCollum's injury meant he was unable to return to bat, so the Irish innings came to a close at 362 runs after their ninth wicket, a lead of just 10 runs. Tongue took two more wickets for England during the day, completing a five-wicket haul on his Test debut.

Having forced England to bat again, Adair opened the bowling, only for Zak Crawley hit three boundaries in four deliveries, giving England a 10-wicket victory. Pope was named the player of the match for his double-century.

== ODI series ==
=== 1st ODI ===
20 September 2023
12:30 (D/N)
Scorecard

| England | v | Ireland |

Match abandoned
Headingley, Leeds
Umpires: Mike Burns (Eng) and Adrian Holdstock (SA)

- No toss.
- No play was possible due to rain.

=== 2nd ODI ===
23 September 2023
11:00
Scorecard

| England; 334/8 (50 overs) | v | Ireland; 286 (46.4 overs) |
| Will Jacks 94 (88); George Dockrell 3/43 (8 overs) | | George Dockrell 43 (54); Rehan Ahmed 4/54 (10 overs) |

England won by 48 runs
Trent Bridge, Nottingham
Umpires: David Millns (Eng) and Rod Tucker (Aus)
Player of the match: Will Jacks (Eng)

- Ireland won the toss and elected to field.
- Sam Hain, Tom Hartley, George Scrimshaw and Jamie Smith (Eng) all made their ODI debuts.

=== 3rd ODI ===
26 September 2023
12:30 (D/N)
Scorecard

| England; 280/4 (31 overs) | v | Ireland |
| Ben Duckett 107* (78); Craig Young 3/31 (7 overs) |

No result
County Ground, Bristol
Umpires: Mike Burns (Eng) and Paul Reiffel (Aus)

- Ireland won the toss and elected to field.
- No further play was possible due to rain.
- Theo van Woerkom (Ire) made his ODI debut.
