= 2025 United Arab Emirates Tri-Nation Series =

2025 United Arab Emirates Tri-Nation Series may refer to:

- 2025 United Arab Emirates Tri-Nation Series (List A)
- 2025 United Arab Emirates Tri-Nation Series (League 2)
