= Jordan Neill =

South African-Irish cricketer (born 2005)

Personal information
- Full name: Jordan Enno Neill
- Born: 3 September 2005 (age 21); Cape Town, Western Cape, South Africa
- Batting: Right-handed
- Bowling: Right-arm medium-fast
- Role: All-rounder

International information
- National side: Ireland
- Test debut (cap 31): 11 November 2025 v Bangladesh
- Last Test: 19 November 2025 v Bangladesh
- ODI debut (cap 74): 25 May 2025 v West Indies
- Last ODI: 1 November 2026 v Namibia

Domestic team information
- Years: Team
- 2024: Munster Reds
- 2024–2025: Northern Knights
- 2026: Amsterdam Flames

Career statistics
Competition	Test	ODI	FC	LA
Matches	2	4	2	19
Runs scored	145	70	145	252
Batting average	36.25	35.00	36.25	18.00
100s/50s	0/0	0/0	0/0	0/0
Top score	49	33	49	38*
Balls bowled	186	132	186	575
Wickets	1	1	1	5
Bowling average	155.00	112.00	155.00	120.60
5 wickets in innings	0	0	0	0
10 wickets in match	0	0	0	0
Best bowling	1/48	1/28	1/48	2/70
Catches/stumpings	0/–	0/–	0/–	1/–
- Source: Cricinfo, 1 November 2026

Jordan Enno Neill (born 3 September 2005) is a South African-born Irish cricketer, currently playing for the Northern Knights in domestic cricket.

== Career ==
Neill played two-day intra squad match in 2023. In December 2023, he was named in Ireland under-19 cricket team for the 2024 Under-19 Cricket World Cup.

Neill made his T20 debut for Munster Reds against Leinster Lightning in the 2024 Inter-Provincial Trophy, on 1 May 2024. He made his List A debut for Munster Reds against Leinster Lightning in the 2024 Inter-Provincial Cup, on 15 May 2024.

In February 2025, he was named as a replacement of Barry McCarthy in ODI squad against Zimbabwe, who was ruled out due to injury. In May 2025, he was again named along with Stephen Doheny in national squad as a replacement of Curtis Campher and Craig Young in the ODI squad for the series against the West Indies. He made his ODI debut in the third ODI of the following series against West Indies on 25 May 2025.
