= Conor Hoey =

Irish former cricketer (born 1968)

Personal information
- Full name: Conor Joseph Hoey
- Born: 24 March 1968 (age 58); Dublin, Ireland
- Batting: Right-handed
- Bowling: Leg spin
- Relatives: Gavin Hoey (son)

Career statistics
Competition	First-class	List A
Matches	4	6
Runs scored	21	44
Batting average	7.00	14.66
100s/50s	0/0	0/0
Top score	8	26*
Balls bowled	687	307
Wickets	9	3
Bowling average	37.11	71.00
5 wickets in innings	0	0
10 wickets in match	0	0
Best bowling	3/38	1/8
Catches/stumpings	1/0	0/0
- Source: CricInfo, 27 March 2019

Conor Joseph Hoey (born 24 March 1968) is an Irish former cricketer. A right-handed batsman and leg spin bowler, he played 42 times for the Ireland cricket team between 1991 and 1995 including four first-class matches and six List A matches. He is the father of Gavin Hoey, who is also an Irish cricketer currently playing for the Leinster Lightning in the Inter-Provincial Trophy.

== Playing career ==
Hoey made his debut for Ireland on their tour of Zimbabwe in March 1991, taking 6/19 against Mashonaland Districts, his best bowling figures for Ireland. This tour was followed by him making his first-class debut in June that year against Scotland. He followed this with his List A debut against Middlesex and games against the West Indies, the Free Foresters, the MCC and Wales.

"Beany" continued in the Irish side in 1992, scoring 34 against Middlesex, his top score for Ireland, to start the year, followed by matches against Scotland, Durham, the MCC, Wales and Gloucestershire. Ireland gained associate membership of the International Cricket Council in 1993 and Hoey was an important part of the Irish team at that point, playing eight times in 1993, including internationals against Scotland and the Netherlands in addition to the Triple Crown Tournament.

He remained an integral part of the Irish side, playing in the inaugural ICC Trophy campaign in 1994. He took ten wickets in the tournament at an average of 23.90, winning man of the match awards against Papua New Guinea and Malaysia.

That year was rounded off with his final first-class match against Scotland and the Triple Crown Tournament in July. The following year would be his last in the Irish side, playing Benson & Hedges Cup matches against Surrey, Sussex and Kent before his final match against Scotland in his home town of Dublin.

== Statistics ==
In all matches for Ireland, he scored 190 runs at an average of 8.26 and took 78 wickets at an average of 30.33, taking five wickets in an innings four times.
