= Paul Mooney (cricketer) =

Irish cricketer (born 1976)

Personal information
- Full name: Paul John Kevin Mooney
- Born: 15 October 1976 (age 50); Dublin, Ireland
- Batting: Right-handed
- Bowling: Right-arm medium
- Role: All-rounder
- Relatives: John Mooney (brother)

International information
- National side: Ireland
- ODI debut (cap 9): 13 June 2006 v England
- Last ODI: 3 April 2007 v South Africa
- ODI shirt no.: 32

Career statistics
Competition	ODI	FC	LA	ICC T
Matches	4	11	20	13
Runs scored	12	174	130	63
Batting average	12.00	14.50	21.66	15.75
100s/50s	0/0	0/0	0/0	0/0
Top score	11*	32	24	22*
Balls bowled	87	853	763	614
Wickets	0	20	22	17
Bowling average	–	24.45	30.86	25.11
5 wickets in innings	–	0	0	0
10 wickets in match	–	0	0	0
Best bowling	–	4/12	4/34	4/17
Catches/stumpings	2/–	6/–	4/–	2/–
- Source: CricketArchive, 8 September 2009

Paul John Kevin Mooney (born 15 October 1976) is a former Irish cricketer.

A member of the successful North County, Mooney is a medium-pace bowler and competent lower-order batsman. He first appeared for Ireland in 1998 against Marylebone Cricket Club at Lurgan. He is the elder brother of fellow Irish squadmate John.

Mooney has often reserved his best efforts at international level for fixtures involving more exalted opposition, most notably against Zimbabwe at Clontarf in June 2000, when he removed both Andy and Grant Flower for nought in the process of contributing 4-24 to Ireland's forlorn defence of a meagre total. Three years later, Mooney's 2-19 was a crucial component of Ireland's 10-wicket victory over the same opposition at Stormont. He also featured in Ireland's historic victory over the West Indies at the Belfast venue in June 2004, when three valuable wickets mitigated the 67 runs he conceded off his ten overs.

Mooney, a survivor of Ireland's disastrous 2001 ICC Trophy campaign in Canada (where his 4–17 against Bermuda emerged as a rare highlight of the tour), featured in all six matches at the 2005 event, which Ireland hosted. An integral member of the bowling unit which served Ireland so well, Mooney took eight wickets at 25.12 (including 3–10 against Uganda) as Ireland claimed the runners-up position and consequent qualification for the 2007 Cricket World Cup.

On 20 April 2007, after Ireland's campaign in the 2007 World Cup, where he played one match in the tournament and the team qualified for the super eights, Mooney announced his retirement from cricket at the age of 30. Looking back at his career for Ireland, he said "I have been fortunate to have represented Ireland for ten years now, and during that period I have had some of the best times and experiences of my life".

From 2008 to 2010, he was the head coach of Riccarton cricket club in Christchurch, New Zealand.
