= John Mooney (cricketer) =

Irish cricketer

Personal information
- Full name: John Francis Mooney
- Born: 10 February 1982 (age 44); Dublin, Ireland
- Batting: Left-handed
- Bowling: Right-arm medium
- Role: All-rounder
- Relatives: Paul Mooney (brother)

International information
- National side: Ireland (2004–2015)
- ODI debut (cap 8): 13 June 2006 v England
- Last ODI: 11 October 2015 v Zimbabwe
- ODI shirt no.: 10
- T20I debut (cap 13): 21 July 2009 v Bangladesh
- Last T20I: 25 July 2015 v Netherlands
- T20I shirt no.: 10

Career statistics
Competition	ODI	T20I	FC	LA
Matches	64	27	17	92
Runs scored	963	231	723	1,344
Batting average	23.48	16.50	40.16	21.67
100s/50s	0/3	0/0	1/5	0/4
Top score	96	31*	107	96
Balls bowled	1,797	156	1,453	2,721
Wickets	48	10	35	71
Bowling average	34.06	17.60	22.68	34.21
5 wickets in innings	0	0	2	0
10 wickets in match	0	0	1	0
Best bowling	4/27	2/7	5/36	4/27
Catches/stumpings	19/–	13/–	15/–	29/–
- Source: CricketArchive, 9 March 2016

John Francis Mooney (born 10 February 1982) is a former Irish cricketer. A left-handed batsman and a right-arm medium fast bowler, Mooney made his first-class debut in 2004. He had previously represented Ireland in the Under-19s World Cup of 2000 and has captained Ireland A. He made his One Day International (ODI) debut in 2006 in Ireland's inaugural match in the format. In January 2010, Mooney became one of six players with full-time contracts with Cricket Ireland. He was named "Ireland Player of the Year" for 2010. His brother, Paul, has also represented Ireland in international cricket.

== Cricket career ==
Mooney was first drafted into the Ireland team as a bowler. He made his first-class debut in July 2004, playing an ICC Intercontinental Cup match against Netherlands. He batted once, not scoring a run before he was lbw to Edgar Schiferli, and did not bowl. After a gap of two years, in August 2006 Mooney played his second first-class match. Although he again went runless, he took his maiden wicket in the match, that of Scotland's John Blain, caught by Jeremy Bray. He represented Ireland in the EurAsia cricket series of 2006, in which Ireland finished bottom of their group with two losses from two games, and the C&G Trophy.

Ireland played their inaugural One Day International on 13 June 2006. against England which England won the 38 runs, completing the victory in front of a full crowd at Stormont. Mooney took three wickets in the match – those of Marcus Trescothick, Paul Collingwood, and Ian Bell – and later identified the match as one of the highlights of his career. He finished with 30 not out from 26 balls. Mooney was part of Ireland's 15-man squad that travelled to the West Indies in February 2007 to play in the country's first World Cup. They achieved a tie against Zimbabwe and victories over Pakistan and Bangladesh, and ended the tournament ranked 10th overall in the official ICC rankings, taking many by surprise and receiving a "heroes welcome" when they returned home. Ireland were a mostly amateur outfit at the time. After the World Cup, Mooney withdrew from the team in order to complete his electrical apprenticeship.

Mooney captained Ireland A during the 2008 European Cricket Championship; the team won the competition and Mooney was named player of the tournament. Ireland participated in the 2009 ICC World Twenty20, hosted by England in July; the team progressed to the second round after beating Bangladesh. Ireland's coach, Phil Simmons, identified Mooney as the team's stand-out player of the tournament. Over the course of the 2009 season, Mooney concentrated on his batting, later saying that he felt "bowling medium pace makes you more or less cannon fodder for the real top class player". In the 2009/10 season, Mooney travelled to Australia to play club cricket. His intention was to play a longer format of the game, in which his side batted for 92 overs, with the aim of gaining selection in Ireland's first-class side. He also stated that he wanted the opportunity to bowl long spells while in Australia in an effort to revive his form.

=== Full-time contract ===
Cricket Ireland, the governing body for cricket in Ireland, awarded Mooney a full-time contract in January 2010. He was one of six players to be awarded such contracts with Cricket Ireland, and came just a year after the first professional contracts were awarded to Ireland's cricketers. Before that players were amateurs relying on income from other jobs and playing cricket in their spare time. The contract allowed Mooney and the others to focus on cricket, with the aim of improving ahead of the 2011 World Cup.

Mooney's maiden first-class runs scored during his maiden half-century, which came in his third first-class match. His innings of 58 not out came against Afghanistan in January 2010 as part of the 2009–10 ICC Intercontinental Cup. In January 2011, Mooney was voted "Ireland Player of the Year" for 2010. He played in 42 of Ireland's 44 matches that year, scoring 818 runs across all formats, and took 12 wickets with his medium-pacers at an average of 30.92.

Mooney was selected in Ireland's 15-man squad for the 2011 World Cup. In the game against England, Mooney struck the winning runs in Ireland's historic win. With ten wickets at an average of 25.90, Mooney was Ireland's leading wicket-taker in the tournament. Mooney's performance against England in an ODI in August 2011 impressed Sussex coach Mark Robinson and with the help of Sussex and Ireland batsman Ed Joyce it was arranged that Mooney would have a three-week trial with the club in May 2012. He left the trial a week early explaining that

I wasn't really getting a look in in the T20 games as Sussex wanted to get a look at their contracted players first, which is only right. Carl [Hopkinson, the Sussex 2nd XI coach] was happy with my attitude and playing style, but I felt I wasn't doing myself justice. I've been easing myself back into bowling following my hamstring tear (sustained against Scotland in the ICC World Twenty20 qualifiers) and was short of full match fitness having been out of competitive action for seven weeks. I've a young family to support and the trial was putting a strain on that."

Following the death of Margaret Thatcher, Mooney left a Twitter comment "I hope it was slow and painful". As a result, Cricket Ireland banned him for three matches.

On 7 December 2015, John Mooney announced his retirement from international cricket.

== Coaching career ==
Mooney was named as fielding coach of Denmark national cricket team in February 2016. He joins his former Irish teammate Jeremy Bray who is head coach of the team and first assignment is World Cricket League Division Four. In January 2018, Mooney was hired as fielding coach of Afghanistan by his former Ireland coach Phil Simmons. In January 2020, he returned to his role with the Danish team, ahead of their fixtures in the 2020 Malaysia Cricket World Cup Challenge League A tournament.
