= List of Ireland Test cricketers =

This is a list of Ireland Test cricketers. Ireland were granted full membership and therefore Test status at the International Cricket Council's annual conference held on 22 June 2017, after having been one of the leading associate members for many years. Ireland played their first Test match in May 2018 against Pakistan at the Malahide Cricket Club Ground in Dublin.

A Test match is an international cricket match between two representative teams that are full members of the ICC. Both teams have two innings, and the match lasts up to five days.

The list is arranged in the order in which each player won his first Test cap. Where more than one player won his first Test cap in the same match, those players are listed alphabetically by surname.

== Key ==
General

- ‡ – Captain
- † – Wicket-keeper
- First – Year of Test debut for Ireland
- Last – Year of latest Test for Ireland
- Mat – Number of Test appearances for Ireland

Batting

- Runs – Runs scored in career
- HS – Highest score
- Avg – Runs scored per dismissal
- * – Batsman remained not out

Bowling

- Balls – Balls bowled in career
- Wkt – Wickets taken in career
- BBI – Best bowling in an innings
- Ave – Average runs per wicket

Fielding

- Ca – Catches taken
- St – Stumpings effected

== Players ==
Statistics are correct as of 27 May 2026.

Ireland Test cricketers
Cap	Name	First	Last	Mat	Runs	HS	Avg	Balls	Wkt	BBI	Ave	Ca	St	Ref(s)
Cap	Name	First	Last	Mat	Batting			Bowling				Fielding		Ref(s)
1	William Porterfield ‡	2018	2019	3	58	32	9.66	0	–	–	–	2	0	
2	Andrew Balbirnie ‡	2018	2026	13	575	95	23.00	6	0	–	–	15	0	
3	Ed Joyce	2018	2018	1	47	43	23.50	0	–	–	–	1	0	
4	Tyrone Kane	2018	2018	1	14	14	7.00	156	0	–	–	0	0	
5	Tim Murtagh	2018	2019	3	109	54*	27.25	570	13	5/13	16.38	0	0	
6	Kevin O'Brien	2018	2019	3	258	118	51.60	60	0	–	–	0	0	
7	Niall O'Brien †	2018	2018	1	18	18	9.00	0	–	–	–	2	0	
8	Boyd Rankin (Note: Boyd Rankin has also played Test cricket for England. Only his record for Ireland is given above.)	2018	2019	2	30	17	10.00	318	7	2/5	31.85	0	0	
9	Paul Stirling	2018	2025	10	521	103	26.05	12	0	–	–	8	0	
10	Stuart Thompson	2018	2019	3	64	53	10.66	410	10	3/28	20.40	0	0	
11	Gary Wilson †	2018	2019	2	45	33*	15.00	0	–	–	–	6	0	
12	James Cameron-Dow	2019	2019	1	41	32*	41.00	143	3	2/94	39.33	2	0	
13	George Dockrell	2019	2023	2	98	39	24.50	369	3	2/63	77.66	0	0	
14	Andy McBrine	2019	2026	12	667	90*	35.10	2,560	34	6/109	43.38	2	0	
15	James McCollum	2019	2023	6	199	39	18.09	0	–	–	–	2	0	
16	Stuart Poynter †	2019	2019	1	1	1	0.50	0	–	–	–	2	1	
17	Mark Adair	2019	2026	8	397	88	33.08	1,312	28	5/39	27.89	4	0	
18	Curtis Campher	2023	2026	10	466	111	25.88	600	6	2/13	77.50	3	0	
19	Murray Commins	2023	2023	2	6	5	1.50	0	–	–	–	2	0	
20	Graham Hume	2023	2023	3	36	14	7.20	300	2	1/85	104.50	0	0	
21	Peter Moor (Note: Peter Moor has also played Test cricket for Zimbabwe. Only his record for Ireland is given above.)	2023	2025	7	201	79	14.35	0	–	–	–	3	0	
22	Harry Tector	2023	2026	10	492	85	24.60	204	1	1/33	171.00	5	0	
23	Lorcan Tucker †	2023	2025	9	703	108	43.93	0	–	–	–	22	2	
24	Ben White	2023	2023	3	1	1	0.50	459	4	2/71	109.00	0	0	
25	Matthew Humphreys	2023	2025	5	67	27*	11.16	997	15	6/57	37.13	5	0	
26	Fionn Hand	2023	2023	1	8	7	4.00	114	1	1/113	113.00	1	0	
27	Barry McCarthy	2024	2025	3	17	11	4.25	543	14	4/75	17.71	1	0	
28	Theo van Woerkom	2024	2024	1	1	1	1.00	108	1	1/43	55.00	0	0	
29	Craig Young	2024	2025	3	11	5	3.66	376	8	3/24	23.50	1	0	
30	Cade Carmichael	2025	2026	3	106	59	17.66	0	–	–	–	1	0	
31	Jordan Neill	2025	2025	2	145	49	36.25	186	1	1/48	155.00	0	0	
32	Stephen Doheny	2025	2026	2	118	57	29.50	0	–	–	–	0	0	
33	Gavin Hoey	2025	2025	1	41	37	20.50	306	4	2/84	49.75	1	0	
34	Thomas Mayes	2026	2026	1	8	5	4.00	138	0	–	–	1	0	
35	Liam McCarthy	2026	2026	1	12	11	6.00	144	1	1/130	130.00	1	0	
36	Reuben Wilson	2026	2026	1	4	4	2.00	150	1	1/89	89.00	1	0	

== See also ==
- Ireland cricket team
- List of Ireland ODI cricketers
- List of Ireland Twenty20 International cricketers
