= Inter-Provincial T20 Festival =

- Countries: Ireland
- Administrator: Cricket Ireland, Cricket Leinster
- Format: Twenty20
- First edition: July 2018
- Latest edition: July 2018
- Tournament format: Single round-robin
- Number of teams: 4 as of 2018
- 2018 Inter-Provincial T20 Festival

The Inter-Provincial T20 Festival, known for sponsorship reasons as the Hanley Energy Inter-Provincial T20 Festival, is a Twenty20 cricket tournament in Ireland over three days between the four leading cricketing provinces of Ireland. The tournament was first held in July 2018 at Pembroke Cricket Club in Sandymount, Dublin. All four inter-provincial sides in the season long T20 competition, the Inter-Provincial Trophy, will take part.

== Format ==
The tournament, inaugurated in 2018 is held as a single round-robin format with each team playing each other once, with six matches over three days between 6 and 8 July 2018.

== Teams ==
Four teams will initially participate in the tournament, Leinster, Northern and North-West, and Munster . Pembroke Cricket Club will host the competition.

== Competition placings ==
=== 2018 to Present ===
Season	Winner	Second	Third	Fourth
2018	Northern Knights	Leinster Lightning	Munster Reds	North West Warriors

== See also ==
- Cricket in Ireland
- History of cricket
- Inter-Provincial Championship
- Inter-Provincial Cup
- Inter-Provincial Trophy
