= Theo van Woerkom =

New Zealand-born Irish cricketer (born 1993)

Personal information
- Full name: Theo Francis van Woerkom
- Born: 26 July 1993 (age 33); Christchurch, New Zealand
- Batting: Right-handed
- Bowling: Slow left-arm orthodox
- Role: Bowler

International information
- National side: Ireland
- Only Test (cap 28): 28 February 2024 v Afghanistan
- ODI debut (cap 68): 26 September 2023 v England
- Last ODI: 12 March 2024 v Afghanistan
- Only T20I (cap 59): 9 December 2023 v Zimbabwe

Domestic team information
- Years: Team
- 2015/16–2022/23: Canterbury
- 2023: Northern Knights

Career statistics
| Competition | Test | ODI | T20I | FC |
|---|---|---|---|---|
| Matches | 1 | 4 | 1 | 32 |
| Runs scored | 1 | 4 | – | 583 |
| Batting average | 1.00 | – | – | 19.43 |
| 100s/50s | 0/0 | –/– | –/– | 0/3 |
| Top score | 1 | 2* | – | 63* |
| Balls bowled | 108 | 168 | 6 | 4,050 |
| Wickets | 1 | 5 | 0 | 50 |
| Bowling average | 51.00 | 35.20 | – | 39.70 |
| 5 wickets in innings | 0 | 0 | – | 1 |
| 10 wickets in match | 0 | 0 | – | 0 |
| Best bowling | 1/43 | 3/55 | – | 5/42 |
| Catches/stumpings | 0/– | 1/– | 0/– | 14/– |
- Source: Cricinfo, 26 May 2025

Theo Francis van Woerkom (born 26 July 1993) is a New Zealand-born Irish cricketer who played for Canterbury. In September 2023, van Woerkom switched international allegiance from New Zealand to Ireland.

== Domestic career ==
He made his first-class debut on 15 October 2015 in the 2015–16 Plunket Shield. In June 2018, he was awarded a contract with Canterbury for the 2018–19 season. He made his List A debut for Canterbury in the 2018–19 Ford Trophy on 24 October 2018 against Wellington.

In June 2020, he was offered a contract by Canterbury ahead of the 2020–21 domestic cricket season.

== International career ==
Van Woerkom holds an Irish passport via his maternal grandmother who was born in Ireland. In January 2023 he signed to play club cricket in Northern Ireland for C.I.Y.M.S. Cricket Club. He was called up to the Irish national squad in July 2023 as a late replacement for Gareth Delany at the 2023 ICC T20 World Cup Europe Qualifier Regional Final in Scotland, although he did not play a game in the tournament. In September 2023, he made his One Day International debut for Ireland against England.
