= List of Ireland ODI cricketers =

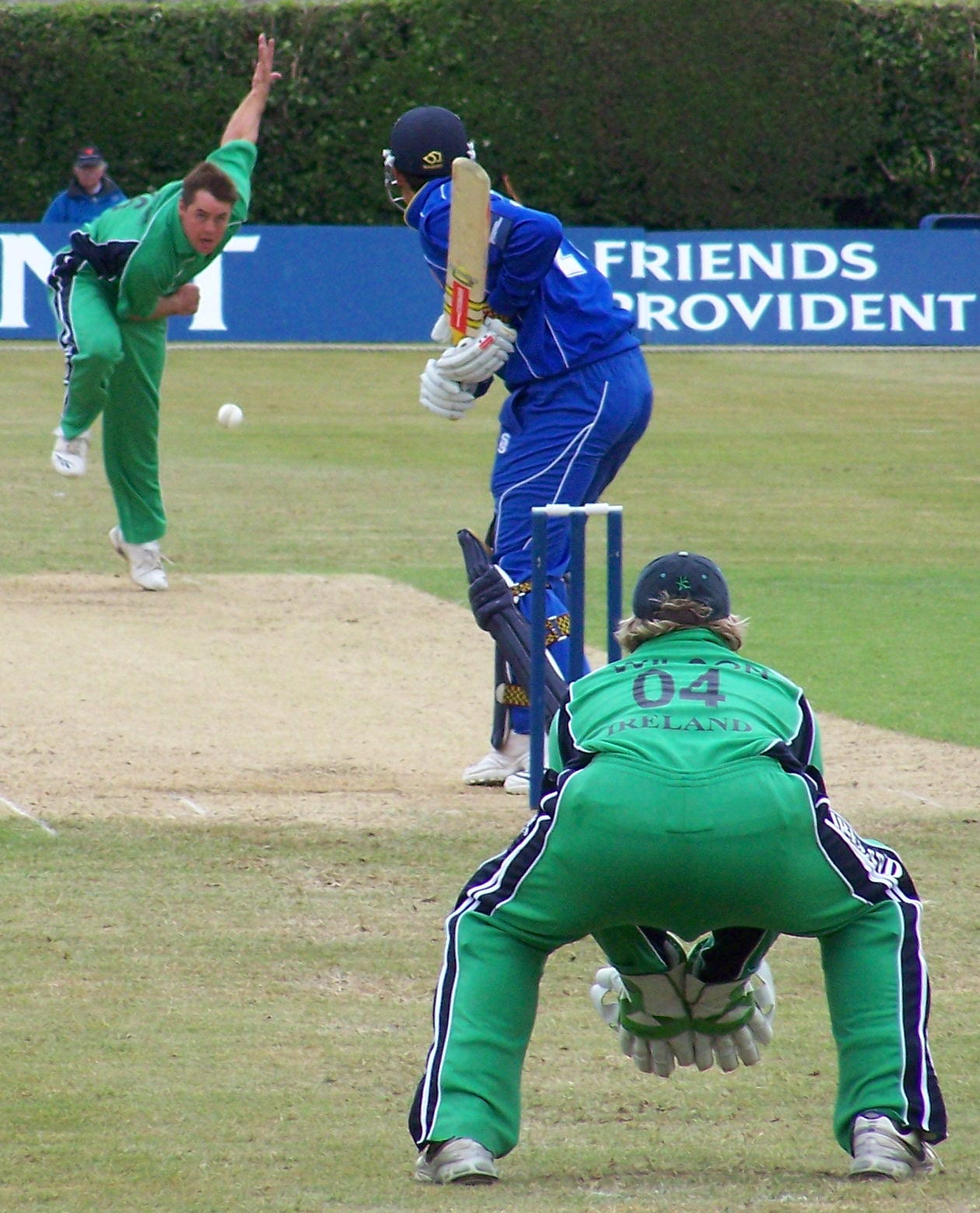
Gary Wilson, who has kept wicket for Ireland in ODIs, keeping wicket against Essex.

Since their first match in 2006, 74 players have represented Ireland in One Day Internationals (ODIs). A One Day International is an international cricket match between two representative teams, each having ODI status, as determined by the International Cricket Council (ICC). An ODI differs from Test matches in that the number of overs per team is limited, and that each team has only one innings. Where more than one player won his first ODI cap in the same match, those players are listed alphabetically by surname.

Ireland have played 219 ODIs, resulting in 85 victories, 115 defeats, 3 ties and 16 no results. Ireland played their maiden ODI on 13 June 2006 against England. Ireland lost by 38 runs, although the match drew interest and was played in front a full capacity crowd at the Civil Service Cricket Club in Belfast.

Jeremy Bray scored Ireland's first ODI century on 30 January 2007 in a match against Scotland. Bray later scored Ireland's maiden World Cup century when he struck 115 not out against Zimbabwe on 15 March 2007. The highest score in ODIs for Ireland is 177, scored by Paul Stirling against Canada on 7 September 2010. The record for best bowling figures in an innings for Ireland in ODIs is held by Jai Moondra, who took 6/26 against Namibia on 30 October 2026. Stirling is Ireland's leading run scorer with 6,213 runs and Kevin O'Brien is the country's leading wicket-taker with 114 wickets.

== Key ==
General

- ‡ – Captain
- † – Wicket-keeper
- First – Year of debut
- Last – Year of latest game
- Mat – Number of matches played
- Win% – Winning percentage

Batting

- Runs – Runs scored in career
- HS – Highest score
- Avg – Runs scored per dismissal
- * – Batsman remained not out

Bowling

- Balls – Balls bowled in career
- Wkt – Wickets taken in career
- BBI – Best bowling in an innings
- Ave – Average runs per wicket
- 5WI – Five wickets or more in a match

Fielding

- Ca – Catches taken
- St – Stumpings taken

== Players ==
Statistics are correct as of 1 November 2026.

Ireland ODI cricketers
General					Batting					Bowling					Fielding		Ref(s)
Cap	Name	First	Last	Mat	Runs	HS	Avg	50	100	Balls	Wkt	BBI	Ave	5WI	Ca	St	Ref(s)
1	Andre Botha	2006	2011	42	666	56	19.58	2	0	1,560	42	4/19	27.00	0	11	0	
2	Jeremy Bray †	2006	2007	15	401	116	28.64	0	2	–	–	–	–	–	6	0	
3	Peter Gillespie	2006	2007	5	2	2	0.50	0	0	–	–	–	–	–	0	0	
4	Trent Johnston ‡	2006	2013	67	743	45*	19.55	0	0	2,930	66	5/14	32.04	1	25	0	
5	Dominick Joyce	2006	2007	3	29	18	9.66	0	0	–	–	–	–	–	1	0	
6	Dave Langford-Smith	2006	2008	22	142	31*	15.77	0	0	942	25	3/32	31.88	0	5	0	
7	Kyle McCallan ‡	2006	2009	39	361	50*	20.05	1	0	1,804	39	4/30	30.97	0	4	0	
8	John Mooney	2006	2015	60	963	96	23.48	3	0	1,797	48	4/27	34.06	0	19	0	
9	Paul Mooney	2006	2007	4	12	11*	12.00	0	0	87	0	–	–	–	2	0	
10	Kevin O'Brien ‡	2006	2021	153	3,619	142	29.42	18	2	4,296	114	4/13	32.68	0	67	0	
11	Andrew White	2006	2014	61	776	79	18.04	1	0	869	25	4/44	27.52	0	21	0	
12	Eoin Morgan	2006	2009	23	744	115	35.42	5	1	–	–	–	–	–	9	0	(Note: Eoin Morgan has also played One Day International cricket for England. Only his record for Ireland is given above.)
13	Niall O'Brien †	2006	2018	103	2,581	109	28.05	18	1	–	–	–	–	–	90	14	
14	William Porterfield ‡	2006	2022	148	4,343	139	30.58	20	11	–	–	–	–	–	68	0	
15	Kenny Carroll	2007	2007	6	70	28*	11.66	0	0	6	0	–	–	–	4	0	
16	Boyd Rankin	2007	2020	68	95	18*	7.91	0	0	3,383	96	4/15	28.27	0	17	0	(Note: Boyd Rankin has also played One Day International cricket for England. Only his record for Ireland is given above.)
17	Thinus Fourie	2007	2008	7	42	19*	21.00	0	0	179	1	1/33	128.00	0	1	0	
18	Roger Whelan	2007	2007	2	5	5	2.50	0	0	90	2	1/43	49.50	0	0	0	
19	Gary Wilson †	2007	2019	105	2,072	113	23.81	12	1	–	–	–	–	–	73	10	
20	Alex Cusack	2007	2015	58	745	71	22.57	2	0	1,953	63	5/20	23.96	1	18	0	
21	Gary Kidd	2007	2008	6	15	15	15.00	0	0	216	1	1/27	172.00	0	1	0	
22	Reinhardt Strydom	2008	2008	9	83	37	13.83	0	0	48	1	1/63	63.00	0	3	0	
23	Greg Thompson	2008	2008	3	2	2	1.00	0	0	72	1	1/35	73.00	0	1	0	
24	Peter Connell	2008	2010	13	40	22*	20.00	0	0	564	13	3/68	39.84	0	1	0	
25	Phil Eaglestone	2008	2008	1	4	4	4.00	0	0	42	1	1/60	60.00	0	0	0	
26	Ryan Haire	2008	2008	2	56	54	28.00	1	0	–	–	–	–	–	1	0	
27	Andrew Poynter	2008	2014	19	255	78	19.61	2	0	–	–	–	–	–	9	0	
28	Paul Stirling ‡	2008	2026	177	6,213	177	37.65	34	14	2,441	43	6/55	45.16	1	72	0	
29	Regan West	2008	2009	10	61	29*	30.50	0	0	447	9	4/26	31.00	0	4	0	
30	Andrew Britton	2009	2009	1	–	–	–	–	–	36	0	–	–	–	0	0	
31	George Dockrell	2010	2026	139	1,610	91*	23.00	6	0	4,943	113	4/24	35.80	0	53	0	
32	James Hall	2010	2010	3	28	15	9.33	0	0	–	–	–	–	–	0	0	
33	Nigel Jones	2010	2011	14	74	25*	14.80	0	0	369	10	2/19	23.40	0	7	0	
34	Rory McCann †	2010	2010	8	44	18	11.00	0	0	–	–	–	–	–	9	0	
35	Andrew Balbirnie ‡	2010	2026	126	3,519	145*	31.70	17	10	60	2	1/26	34.00	0	48	0	
36	Albert van der Merwe	2010	2011	9	15	8	3.75	0	0	432	11	5/49	29.36	1	1	0	
37	Ed Joyce	2011	2018	61	2,151	160*	41.36	12	5	–	–	–	–	–	21	0	(Note: Ed Joyce has also played One Day International cricket for England. Only his record for Ireland is given above.)
38	Tim Murtagh	2012	2019	58	188	23*	7.83	0	0	3,020	74	5/21	30.94	1	16	0	
39	James Shannon	2013	2013	1	2	2	2.00	0	0	–	–	–	–	–	0	0	
40	Max Sorensen	2013	2016	13	125	31	20.83	0	0	543	16	4/40	32.50	0	3	0	
41	Eddie Richardson	2013	2013	2	12	12	12.00	0	0	66	2	2/39	27.00	0	0	0	
42	Stuart Thompson	2013	2017	20	228	39	16.28	0	0	559	12	2/17	40.83	0	8	0	
43	John Anderson	2014	2016	8	151	39	18.87	0	0	30	0	–	–	–	3	0	
44	Andy McBrine	2014	2026	99	965	79	18.55	2	0	4,667	93	5/29	38.47	1	36	0	
45	Stuart Poynter †	2014	2019	21	185	36	13.21	0	0	–	–	–	–	–	22	1	
46	Craig Young	2014	2024	48	166	40*	13.83	0	0	2,300	81	5/46	25.85	1	14	0	
47	Graeme McCarter	2014	2014	1	1	1*	–	0	0	48	0	–	–	–	0	0	
48	Peter Chase	2015	2018	25	35	14	3.50	0	0	1,238	34	3/33	39.88	0	5	0	
49	Barry McCarthy	2016	2025	45	220	41	9.16	0	0	2,405	81	5/46	29.20	1	15	0	
50	Sean Terry	2016	2016	5	32	16	6.40	0	0	–	–	–	–	–	2	0	
51	Jacob Mulder	2017	2017	4	15	15*	–	0	0	186	5	3/57	31.00	0	1	0	
52	Simi Singh	2017	2022	35	593	100*	22.80	1	1	1,519	39	5/10	25.92	1	13	0	
53	James McCollum	2019	2021	10	188	73	18.80	2	0	–	–	–	–	–	2	0	
54	James Cameron-Dow	2019	2019	4	7	7*	–	0	0	186	5	3/32	30.20	0	2	0	
55	Mark Adair	2019	2026	57	488	32	16.82	0	0	2,667	77	4/19	33.07	0	29	0	
56	Joshua Little	2019	2025	42	81	29	8.10	0	0	2,021	61	6/36	34.34	1	7	0	
57	Lorcan Tucker ‡†	2019	2026	67	1,196	85	23.45	5	0	–	–	–	–	–	84	4	
58	Shane Getkate	2019	2021	4	23	16*	23.00	0	0	192	7	2/30	20.71	0	1	0	
59	Gareth Delany	2020	2023	21	234	22	18.00	0	0	390	7	2/52	58.57	0	9	0	
60	Curtis Campher	2020	2026	52	1,554	120	37.00	10	2	1,444	38	4/37	37.63	0	16	0	
61	Harry Tector	2020	2026	63	2,174	140	41.80	15	5	335	5	1/5	68.80	0	27	0	
62	Neil Rock †	2022	2022	3	7	5	3.50	0	0	–	–	–	–	–	2	0	
63	Graham Hume	2022	2025	21	79	21	15.80	0	0	964	28	4/34	30.64	0	3	0	
64	Stephen Doheny †	2023	2024	11	165	84	18.33	1	0	–	–	–	–	–	3	1	
65	Murray Commins	2023	2023	2	6	6	6.00	0	0	–	–	–	–	–	1	0	
66	Matthew Humphreys	2023	2026	8	6	4*	6.00	0	0	350	4	2/48	77.75	0	1	0	
67	Ben White	2023	2023	2	–	–	–	–	–	108	1	1/59	118.00	0	0	0	
68	Theo van Woerkom	2023	2024	4	4	2*	–	0	0	168	5	3/55	35.20	0	1	0	
69	Gavin Hoey	2024	2026	10	128	36	16.00	0	0	546	16	4/34	33.50	0	3	0	
70	Fionn Hand	2024	2024	1	0	0	0.00	0	0	48	1	1/44	44.00	0	0	0	
71	Cade Carmichael	2025	2026	12	276	62	25.09	1	0	–	–	–	–	–	4	0	
72	Thomas Mayes	2025	2025	2	8	8*	–	0	0	78	1	1/23	72.00	0	1	0	
73	Liam McCarthy	2025	2026	8	25	8*	25.00	0	0	389	11	3/47	37.54	0	0	0	
74	Jordan Neill	2025	2026	4	70	33	35.00	0	0	132	1	1/28	112.00	0	0	0	
75	Ben Calitz	2026	2026	3	47	27	15.66	0	0	–	–	–	–	–	0	0	
76	Byron McDonough	2026	2026	4	3	3	1.50	0	0	228	5	3/84	52.80	0	1	0	
77	Jai Moondra	2026	2026	8	60	31	10.00	0	0	437	14	6/26	29.35	1	2	0	
78	Tim Tector	2026	2026	2	78	73	39.00	0	0	–	–	–	–	–	0	0	

== See also ==
- List of Irish first-class cricketers
- List of Ireland Test cricketers
- List of Ireland T20I cricketers
