= Jai Moondra =

Irish cricketer

Personal information
- Full name: Jai Moondra
- Born: 10 January 1997 (age 29); Tonk, Rajasthan, India
- Batting: Left-handed
- Bowling: Left-arm fast-medium
- Role: Bowler

International information
- National side: Ireland
- ODI debut (cap 77): 7 August 2026 v Afghanistan
- Last ODI: 1 November 2026 v Namibia
- T20I debut (cap 64): 26 June 2026 v India
- Last T20I: 28 June 2026 v India

Domestic team information
- Years: Team
- 2024–present: Leinster Lightning
- 2026: Rotterdam Dockers

Career statistics
Competition	ODI	T20I	FC	LA
Matches	8	2	1	17
Runs scored	60	3	50	77
Batting average	10.00	–	50.00	9.62
100s/50s	0/0	0/0	0/0	0/0
Top score	31	2*	46*	31
Balls bowled	437	48	114	862
Wickets	14	5	0	28
Bowling average	29.35	11.40	–	29.96
5 wickets in innings	1	0	–	1
10 wickets in match	0	0	–	0
Best bowling	6/26	3/32	–	6/26
Catches/stumpings	2/–	1/–	0/–	3/–
- Source: ESPNCricinfo, 1 November 2026

Jai Moondra (born 10 January 1997) is an Indian-born cricketer who represents the Ireland cricket team. Born in Tonk, Rajasthan, India, Moondra moved to Ireland in 2021 to pursue a master's degree in electronics and communication at the Technological University Dublin. He is a left-handed batsman who bowls left-arm fast-medium and still holds an Indian passport.

After arriving in Ireland, Moondra joined Leinster Cricket Club in Dublin. He made his Twenty20 debut for Leinster against the North West Warriors in August 2024, and his List A debut for Leinster Lightning against the Munster Reds in May 2025. In April 2026, he was named in Leinster Lightning's interprovincial squad for the season.

In May 2026, Moondra was named in the Raiders squad for the Emerald Challenge, a four-day fixture used as part of Ireland's preparation for the Test match against New Zealand. On his first-class debut in that match, he scored 46 not out in the second innings after the Raiders had slumped to 29 for 5, helping extend the game into a fourth day. In June 2026, he took 3 wickets for 31 runs for Leinster Lightning against the North West Warriors in the Inter-Provincial Trophy.

Later that month, Moondra received his first call-up to the Ireland men's T20I squad for the series against India. He made his T20I debut at Stormont on 26 June 2026 and dismissed Sanju Samson with his first ball in international cricket as Ireland recorded their first victory over India in any format. In the second T20I, played on 28 June 2026, he took 3 wickets for 32 runs as Ireland completed a 2–0 series victory.
