= Thomas Mayes =

South African-Irish cricketer (born 2001)

Tom Mayes
Personal information
- Full name: Thomas Mayes
- Born: 4 January 2001 (age 25); South Africa
- Batting: Right-handed
- Bowling: Right-arm medium-fast
- Role: Bowler

International information
- National side: Ireland
- Only Test (cap 34): 27 May 2026 v New Zealand
- ODI debut (cap 72): 21 May 2025 v West Indies
- Last ODI: 23 May 2025 v West Indies

Domestic team information
- Years: Team
- 2021–present: Northern Knights

Career statistics
Competition	Test	ODI	FC	LA
Matches	1	2	6	28
Runs scored	8	8	226	407
Batting average	4.00	–	25.11	23.94
100s/50s	0/0	0/0	0/1	0/1
Top score	5	8*	79	51
Balls bowled	138	78	975	1,156
Wickets	0	1	28	35
Bowling average	–	72.00	21.85	29.77
5 wickets in innings	–	0	2	0
10 wickets in match	–	0	1	0
Best bowling	–	1/23	5/64	3/34
Catches/stumpings	1/–	1/–	4/–	11/–
- Source: Cricinfo, 3 June 2026

Thomas Mayes (born 4 January 2001) is a South African-born Irish cricketer, currently playing for Northern Knights in domestic cricket.

== Domestic career ==
Mayes came to Ireland from South Africa to play for North Down in the NCU Senior League in 2021. He holds an Irish passport through his paternal grandmother, who was born in Dublin.

The then 20 year old was picked by the Emerging Knights for the Future Series, a development pathway tournament.

He made his Twenty20 debut for Northern Knights in the 2021 Inter-Provincial Trophy on 19 September 2021.

He made his List A debut on 2 June 2022, for Northern Knights in the 2022 Inter-Provincial Cup.

Mayes was a part of the Northern Knights team that won an Irish domestic double in 2023. He took 14 wickets across the two competitions.

== International career ==
In March 2023, he was received his first international call-up, included in the Test, ODI and T20I squad for their tours of Bangladesh in March 2023 and in Test squad for their series against Sri Lanka in April 2023.

In May 2023, he was named in Test squad for their tour of England in June 2023.

Mayes made his first-class debut on 26 May 2023, for Ireland against Essex in a warm-up match as part of their tour of England. He impressed in the match, taking 4/68 and 3/55, but was not picked for the Test against England.

He was selected for the Emerging Ireland squad for their tour of the West Indies in November 2023. He played two of the three one-day matches on the tour; scoring his maiden List A half-century in a 26 run win. In the final First-class match of the tour, Mayes completed his first ten-wicket haul, taking 5/64 in the first innings and 5/75 in the second. In March 2024 Mayes was selected in the Ireland Wolves squad to tour Nepal.

Mayes was named in the Ireland squad to play the West Indies at home in a One Day International series in May 2025. He made his debut for the team in the opening match of the series on 21 May 2025.
