= Liam McCarthy (cricketer) =

South African-Irish cricketer (born 2002)

Personal information
- Born: 2 January 2002 (age 24); Johannesburg, Gauteng, South Africa
- Batting: Left-handed
- Bowling: Right-arm medium-fast
- Role: Bowling All-rounder

International information
- National side: Ireland
- Only Test (cap 35): 27 May 2026 v New Zealand
- ODI debut (cap 73): 21 May 2025 v West Indies
- Last ODI: 30 October 2026 v Namibia
- T20I debut (cap 61): 15 June 2025 v West Indies
- Last T20I: 28 June 2026 v India

Domestic team information
- Years: Team
- 2021–2025: Munster Reds
- 2026–present: North West Warriors

Career statistics
Competition	Test	ODI	T20I	FC
Matches	1	8	3	7
Runs scored	12	25	25	124
Batting average	6.00	25.00	12.50	12.40
100s/50s	0/0	0/0	0/0	0/0
Top score	11	8*	16*	35*
Balls bowled	144	389	66	951
Wickets	1	11	1	20
Bowling average	130.00	37.54	132.00	30.25
5 wickets in innings	0	0	0	0
10 wickets in match	0	0	0	0
Best bowling	1/130	3/47	1/29	3/29
Catches/stumpings	1/–	0/–	1/–	4/–
- Source: ESPNcricinfo, 1 November 2026

Liam McCarthy (born 2 January 2002) is a South African-born Irish cricketer, currently playing for Munster Reds in domestic cricket. He plays club cricket for Railway Union where he is the club captain.

== Domestic career ==
Originally from Johannesburg, McCarthy came to Ireland in 2021 to play for Railway Union. He has Irish heritage through both his great-grandmother and great-grandfather.

He was called up to the Munster Reds squad for an Interprovincial T20 round in Comber in September 2021. He made his T20 debut on 17 September against Northern Knights.

He would go on to make his List A debut for Munster on 5 May 2022 against the Knights. He took 3 wickets in the 2022 List A season and 2 in the T20 competition.

McCarthy enjoyed a much improved 2023, finishing as the joint top wicket taker in the Interprovincial Cup with 15 dismissals. He also took 6 wickets in T20s. In a List A match against North West Warriors on 4 September he took his first career five-wicket haul, returning figures of 5/16.

== International career ==
McCarthy received a call-up to the Emerging Ireland squad to tour the West Indies in November 2023. He played two List A games on the tour before making his first-class debut against West Indies Academy on 2 December.

In March 2024 he was named in the Ireland Wolves squad for their tour of Nepal.

McCarthy was named in the Ireland squad to play the West Indies at home in a One Day International series in May 2025. He made his debut for the team in the opening match of the series on 21 May 2025.
