= Cade Carmichael =

South African-Irish cricketer (born 2002)

Personal information
- Full name: Cade Mitchell Carmichael
- Born: 8 March 2002 (age 24); Pietermaritzburg, KwaZulu-Natal, South Africa
- Batting: Right-handed
- Bowling: Right-arm medium
- Role: All-rounder

International information
- National side: Ireland
- Test debut (cap 30): 11 November 2025 v Bangladesh
- Last Test: 27 May 2026 v New Zealand
- ODI debut (cap 71): 21 May 2025 v West Indies
- Last ODI: 1 November 2026 v Namibia

Domestic team information
- Years: Team
- 2022–present: Northern Knights

Career statistics
Competition	Test	ODI	FC	LA
Matches	3	12	9	45
Runs scored	106	276	496	1,298
Batting average	17.66	25.09	29.17	31.65
100s/50s	0/1	0/1	1/3	2/7
Top score	59	62	124	107
Balls bowled	–	–	20	114
Wickets	–	–	1	6
Bowling average	–	–	26.00	18.33
5 wickets in innings	–	–	0	0
10 wickets in match	–	–	0	0
Best bowling	–	–	1/22	3/40
Catches/stumpings	1/–	4/–	5/–	15/–
- Source: Cricinfo, 1 November 2026

Cade Mitchell Carmichael (born 8 March 2002) is an Irish cricketer, currently playing for the Ireland National Team, Northern Knights in domestic cricket and Instonians in club cricket.

== Domestic career ==
Carmichael was influenced by his brother and father, while playing backyard cricket matches. He captained the under-13 A for KwaZulu-Natal in 2015 and received two Cricket South Africa awards for his batting during the Inter Provincial tournament. In 2016, he was awarded Kwa-Zulu Natal Cricket Union (KZNCU) Under-13 Player of the Year award as he scored the fifth highest runs in the season and for his captaincy. He also represents under-17 and under-19 team of KwaZulu-Natal side. He was selected for the South African Under-17 regional camp in July 2018. On 7 October 2019, he played for Dolphins Premier League All Stars against Scotland XI.

He came to Ireland in 2021 to play for Instonians Cricket Club. He was called up to the Northern Knights squad for an Interprovincial T20 in June 2022. He made his Twenty20 debut for Northern Knights in the 2022 Inter-Provincial Trophy on 10 June 2022. He made his List A debut on 4 July 2022, for Northern Knights in the 2022 Inter-Provincial Cup.

He made his first-class debut for Ireland Emerging on 25 November 2023. He scored his maiden century in first-class cricket against Afghanistan A on 9 April 2025. In 2025 while playing for Instonians, he opened the batting for the first time since his school days. He usually bats at the middle order.

== International career ==
Carmichael received a call-up to the Emerging Ireland squad to tour the West Indies in November 2023.

In March 2024 he was named in the Ireland Wolves squad for their tour of Nepal.

Carmichael was named in the Ireland squad to play the West Indies at home in a One Day International series in May 2025. Irish national selector Andrew White said that it was due to "his rise over the last couple of years" and "his ability to adapt his game to conditions". He made his debut for the team in the opening match of the series on 21 May 2025.
