= Gareth Delany =

Irish cricketer (born 1997)

Personal information
- Full name: Gareth James Delany
- Born: 28 April 1997 (age 29); Dublin, Ireland
- Batting: Right-handed
- Bowling: Right-arm leg break
- Role: All-rounder
- Relatives: LK Delany (sister); DC Delany (cousin)

International information
- National side: Ireland
- ODI debut (cap 59): 7 January 2020 v West Indies
- Last ODI: 4 July 2023 v Nepal
- ODI shirt no.: 64
- T20I debut (cap 46): 12 July 2019 v Zimbabwe
- Last T20I: 28 June 2026 v India
- T20I shirt no.: 64

Domestic team information
- Years: Team
- 2017–2020: Leinster Lightning
- 2020: Leicestershire
- 2021–2025: Munster Reds
- 2026–present: North West Warriors
- 2026: Edinburgh Castle Rockers

Career statistics
Competition	ODI	T20I	FC	LA
Matches	21	93	5	70
Runs scored	234	1,294	69	1,362
Batting average	18.00	20.53	11.50	24.76
100s/50s	0/0	0/4	0/0	1/8
Top score	22	89*	22	104
Balls bowled	390	1,244	390	1,746
Wickets	7	60	5	41
Bowling average	58.57	26.08	38.60	42.87
5 wickets in innings	0	0	0	1
10 wickets in match	0	0	0	0
Best bowling	2/52	3/16	3/48	5/39
Catches/stumpings	9/–	30/–	1/–	29/–
- Source: Cricinfo, 25 September 2026

Gareth James Delany (born 28 April 1997) is an Irish cricketer. He made his international debut for the Ireland cricket team in July 2019. In January 2020, he was one of nineteen players to be awarded a central contract from Cricket Ireland, the first year in which all contracts were awarded on a full-time basis.

== Domestic career ==
He made his Twenty20 cricket debut for Leinster Lightning in the 2017 Inter-Provincial Trophy on 26 May 2017. He made his first-class debut for Leinster Lightning in the 2017 Inter-Provincial Championship on 5 June 2017. He made his List A debut for Leinster Lightning in the 2017 Inter-Provincial Cup on 10 September 2017.

In July 2019, he was selected to play for the Dublin Chiefs in the inaugural edition of the Euro T20 Slam cricket tournament. However, the following month the tournament was cancelled.

== International career ==
In June 2019, he was named in the Ireland Wolves squad for their home series against the Scotland A cricket team. Later the same month, he was named in Ireland's squad for their series against Zimbabwe. He made his Twenty20 International (T20I) debut for Ireland against Zimbabwe on 12 July 2019.

In September 2019, he was named in Ireland's squad for the 2019 ICC T20 World Cup Qualifier tournament in the United Arab Emirates. In December 2019, Delany was named in Ireland's One Day International (ODI) squad for their series against the West Indies. He made his ODI debut for Ireland, against the West Indies, on 7 January 2020.

On 10 July 2020, Delany was named in Ireland's 21-man squad to travel to England to start training behind closed doors for the ODI series against the England cricket team. In February 2021, Delany was named in the Ireland Wolves' squad for their tour to Bangladesh. In September 2021, Delany was named in Ireland's provisional squad for the 2021 ICC Men's T20 World Cup.

In May 2024, he was named in Ireland's squad for the 2024 ICC Men's T20 World Cup tournament.
