= Ross Adair =

Irish cricketer

- Born: George Ross Adair; 21 April 1994 (age 32); Holywood, County Down, Northern Ireland
- Education: Sullivan Upper School
- Occupations: Cricketer, rugby union player
- Height: 5 ft 11 in (180 cm)
- Relatives: Mark Adair (brother)
- Cricket career

Cricket information
- Batting: Right-handed
- Bowling: Slow left-arm orthodox
- Role: Top order batter

International information
- National side: Ireland (2023–present)
- T20I debut (cap 56): 12 January 2023 v Zimbabwe
- Last T20I: 28 June 2026 v India

Domestic team information
- Years: Team
- 2020–present: Northern Knights
- 2026: Edinburgh Castle Rockers

Career statistics
| Competition | T20I | LA | T20 |
|---|---|---|---|
| Matches | 23 | 29 | 79 |
| Runs scored | 531 | 649 | 1,563 |
| Batting average | 23.08 | 29.50 | 22.01 |
| 100s/50s | 1/1 | 0/4 | 3/4 |
| Top score | 100 | 95 | 116 |
| Balls bowled | – | 96 | 153 |
| Wickets | – | 5 | 6 |
| Bowling average | – | 21.40 | 37.00 |
| 5 wickets in innings | – | 0 | 0 |
| 10 wickets in match | – | 0 | 0 |
| Best bowling | – | 3/4 | 2/24 |
| Catches/stumpings | 9/– | 8/– | 39/– |
- Source: ESPNcricinfo, 25 September 2026

Rugby union career
- Position(s): Centre, Winger
Senior career
| Years | Team | Apps | (Points) |
| 2014–2015 | Ulster | 1 | (5) |
| 2015–2017 | Jersey Reds | | |
- Correct as of 20 December 2022

George Ross Adair (born Holywood, County Down, 21 April 1994) is a Northern Irish cricketer and former rugby union player who represents Ireland in international competitions.

He plays for the Northern Knights in domestic cricket.

His younger brother, Mark Adair, is also a cricketer, who has played for Ireland in all formats.

== Rugby career ==
Adair played schools rugby for Sullivan Upper School, impressing in the Ulster Schools' Cup in 2011.

He went on to earn two International caps for Ireland at U19 level against England and France. He played for the Ulster Ravens in the British and Irish Cup, and made one senior appearance for Ulster in the Pro12, scoring a try against Dragons in 2015.

He played for Jersey Reds in the RFU Championship for two and a half years, making more than 40 appearances before a degenerative hip condition ended his professional career. Following two operations, he returned to rugby at an amateur level with Ballynahinch RFC, with whom he won the Ulster Senior League in 2019, and was named Club Player of the Year in the Ulster Rugby awards.

== Cricket career ==
He made his Twenty20 debut for the Northern Knights in the 2020 Inter-Provincial Trophy on 20 August 2020. He made his List A debut on 30 June 2021, for Northern Knights in the 2021 Inter-Provincial Cup.

In December 2022, he earned his maiden call-up to the Ireland cricket team for their T20I series against Zimbabwe. He made his Twenty20 International (T20I) debut for Ireland, on 12 January 2023 in the first T20I match.

In May 2024, he was named in Ireland's squad for the 2024 ICC Men's T20 World Cup tournament.

Adair would hit his maiden T20I century on 29 September 2024 against South Africa in the 2nd T20I of their series in Abu Dhabi. He would finish on exactly 100 (58) and hit nine 6s along the way He was just the third Irish man to achieve the feat and fifth Irish cricketer overall alongside Kevin O'Brien, Paul Stirling, Amy Hunter and Gaby Lewis.
