= Bready Cricket Club Ground =

Sports venue in Magheramason, Ireland

Coordinates: 54.9376°N 7.3818°W

- Interactive map of Bready Cricket Club Ground

Ground information
- Location: Magheramason, County Tyrone, Northern Ireland
- Country: Northern Ireland
- Establishment: 1989
- Capacity: 3,000
- Owner: Bready Cricket Club
- Operator: Cricket Ireland
- Tenants: Ireland Cricket Team
- End names
- n/a n/a

International information
- Only men's ODI: 1 July 2019: Ireland v Zimbabwe
- First men's T20I: 18 June 2015: Ireland v Scotland
- Last men's T20I: 15 June 2025: Ireland v West Indies
- First women's T20I: 5 September 2016: Ireland v Bangladesh
- Last women's T20I: 14 July 2019: Ireland v Zimbabwe
- As of 4 September 2021; Source: Cricinfo.com

Bready Cricket Club Ground is a cricket ground in the village of Magheramason, County Tyrone, Northern Ireland. The ground is owned by the Bready Cricket Club. The ground became Ireland's fourth venue for international cricket along with The Village in Malahide, Dublin, Ireland; Castle Avenue in Clontarf, Dublin, Ireland, and the Civil Service Cricket Club Ground in Belfast, Northern Ireland.

== International cricket ==
In May 2015, International Cricket Council cleared the ground to host the shorter format of cricket. The ground hosted its first international cricket match when Ireland played against Scotland in a series of Twenty20 International ( T20I) matches in June 2015.

It was selected as a venue to host matches in the 2015 ICC World Twenty20 Qualifier tournament.

== International centuries ==
=== One Day International centuries ===
Two ODI centuries have been scored at the venue.

No.	Score	Player	Team	Balls	Opposing team	Innings	Date	Result
1	105	Craig Ervine	Zimbabwe	117	Ireland	1	1 July 2019	Lost
2	101	Andrew Balbirnie	Ireland	112	Zimbabwe	2	1 July 2019	Won

=== Twenty20 International centuries ===
One T20I century has been scored at the venue.

No.	Score	Player	Team	Balls	Opposing team	Innings	Date	Result
1	115*	Paul Stirling	Ireland	75	Zimbabwe	1	1 September 2021	Won
