= Craig Young (cricketer) =

Irish cricketer (born 1990)

Personal information
- Full name: Craig Alexander Young
- Born: 4 April 1990 (age 36); Derry, Northern Ireland
- Batting: Right-handed
- Bowling: Right-arm fast-medium
- Role: Bowler

International information
- National side: Ireland (2014–present)
- Test debut (cap 29): 28 February 2024 v Afghanistan
- Last Test: 11 November 2025 v Bangladesh
- ODI debut (cap 46): 8 September 2014 v Scotland
- Last ODI: 7 October 2024 v South Africa
- T20I debut (cap 34): 18 June 2015 v Scotland
- Last T20I: 26 January 2026 v Italy

Domestic team information
- Years: Team
- 2010–2013: Sussex
- 2013–present: North West Warriors
- 2026: Dublin Guardians

Career statistics
Competition	Test	ODI	T20I	FC
Matches	4	48	73	24
Runs scored	17	166	82	114
Batting average	5.66	13.83	6.83	7.60
100s/50s	0/0	0/0	0/0	0/0
Top score	6*	40*	22	23
Balls bowled	448	2,300	1,429	3,417
Wickets	8	81	87	77
Bowling average	30.25	25.85	22.24	26.14
5 wickets in innings	0	1	0	2
10 wickets in match	0	0	0	0
Best bowling	3/24	5/46	4/13	5/37
Catches/stumpings	1/–	14/–	12/–	8/–
- Source: ESPNCricinfo, 23 May 2026

Craig Alexander Young (born 4 April 1990) is a Northern Irish cricketer who represents the Ireland cricket team. Young is a right-handed batsman who bowls right-arm medium pace. On 26 May 2013, Young made his first-class debut for Ireland against Scotland. He made his One Day International debut against Scotland in September 2014, taking 5 wickets for 45 runs. He made his Twenty20 International debut against Scotland on 18 June 2015.

In December 2018, Young was one of nineteen players to be awarded a central contract by Cricket Ireland for the 2019 season. In January 2020, he was one of nineteen players to be awarded a central contract from Cricket Ireland, the first year in which all contracts were awarded on a full-time basis.

== Early and domestic career ==
Young played for Bready Cricket Club in the North West Senior League as a medium pace bowler. After playing for the Ireland national under-19 cricket team at the 2010 ICC Under-19 Cricket World Cup where he took nine wickets, Young was given a one-year contract by Sussex for 2010. A series of injuries prevented him from making a significant impression, and much of his cricket for Sussex came for the county's second team. He made his first-class debut in an ICC Intercontinental Cup for Ireland against Scotland in late 2013, taking four wickets in the first innings and two in the second during an innings victory for Ireland. Early the following year, a few months after being released by Sussex, Young was contracted as an "A" category player for Ireland, the highest level of contract, and he made his one-day debut for the team shortly thereafter, albeit not in a full international match.

In July 2019, Young was selected to play for the Belfast Titans in the inaugural edition of the Euro T20 Slam cricket tournament. However, the following month the tournament was cancelled.

== International career ==
Young made his One Day International debut for Ireland in September 2014, and became the ninth player to take five wickets on ODI debut. That remains his best performance for Ireland in ODIs. In Ireland's 2015 ICC Intercontinental Cup victory over the United Arab Emirates, Young recorded his best match figures in a first-class match, collecting four wickets in the first innings and three in the second, during a large victory for his team.

In May 2018, Young was added to Ireland's Test squad for their match against Pakistan, but he was not selected to play. In June 2019, he was named in the Ireland Wolves squad for their home series against the Scotland A cricket team. In July 2019, he was named in Ireland's Test squad for their one-off match against England at Lord's, but he did not play.

In September 2019, Young was named in Ireland's squad for the 2019 ICC T20 World Cup Qualifier tournament in the United Arab Emirates. On 10 July 2020, Young was named in Ireland's 21-man squad to travel to England to start training behind closed doors for the ODI series against the England cricket team. In September 2021, Young was named in Ireland's provisional squad for the 2021 ICC Men's T20 World Cup.

In May 2024, he was named in Ireland's squad for the 2024 ICC Men's T20 World Cup tournament.
