= Tim Tector =

Irish cricketer (born 2003)

Personal information
- Full name: Tim Heatley Tector
- Born: 7 March 2003 (age 23); Dublin, Ireland
- Batting: Right-handed
- Bowling: Right-arm off break
- Role: Batsman
- Relatives: Jack Tector (brother); Harry Tector (brother); Alice Tector (sister)

International information
- National side: Ireland
- ODI debut (cap 78): 30 October 2026 v Namibia
- Last ODI: 1 November 2026 v Namibia
- T20I debut (cap 60): 25 February 2025 v Zimbabwe
- Last T20I: 28 June 2026 v India

Domestic team information
- Years: Team
- 2020: Munster Reds
- 2021–2026: Leinster Lightning
- 2026: Belfast Wolves

Career statistics
Competition	ODI	T20I	FC	LA
Matches	2	8	1	37
Runs scored	78	121	2	753
Batting average	39.00	17.28	1.00	20.91
100s/50s	0/1	0/0	0/0	1/3
Top score	73	38	2	122
Balls bowled	–	–	–	48
Wickets	–	–	–	2
Bowling average	–	–	–	26.50
5 wickets in innings	–	–	–	0
10 wickets in match	–	–	–	0
Best bowling	–	–	–	1/3
Catches/stumpings	0/–	5/–	3/–	12/–
- Source: Cricinfo, 1 November 2026

Tim Heatley Tector (born 7 March 2003) is an Irish cricketer. He made his Twenty20 debut on 23 February 2020, for Ireland Wolves against Namibia, during their tour to South Africa. In February 2021, Tector was part of the intake for the Cricket Ireland Academy. He made his List A debut on 1 May 2021, for Leinster Lightning in the 2021 Inter-Provincial Cup.

In September 2021, Tector was named as the captain of the Ireland under-19 cricket team for their 2022 ICC Under-19 Cricket World Cup qualification matches in Spain. In December 2021, he was named as the captain of Ireland's team for the 2022 ICC Under-19 Cricket World Cup in the West Indies.

== International career ==
In November 2023, he was named in the Emerging Ireland's squad for their series against West Indies Academy. He made his first-class debut on 2 December 2023, during the second unofficial Test match.

Tector was called up to the senior Ireland squad for their T20I series in Zimbabwe in February 2025 as a replacement for the injured Ross Adair.
