= Gavin Hoey =

Irish cricketer (born 2001)

Personal information
- Born: 5 November 2001 (age 25); Dublin, Ireland
- Batting: Right-handed
- Bowling: Right-arm Leg Break
- Role: Bowler
- Relatives: Conor Hoey (father)

International information
- National side: Ireland (2024–present)
- Only Test (cap 33): 19 November 2025 v Bangladesh
- ODI debut (cap 69): 2 October 2024 v South Africa
- Last ODI: 1 November 2026 v Namibia

Domestic team information
- Years: Team
- 2021–present: Leinster Lightning
- 2026: Belfast Wolves

Career statistics
Competition	Test	ODI	FC	LA
Matches	1	10	6	52
Runs scored	41	128	262	606
Batting average	20.50	16.00	26.20	18.93
100s/50s	0/0	0/0	0/1	0/1
Top score	37	36	87	50
Balls bowled	306	546	928	2,444
Wickets	4	16	12	86
Bowling average	49.75	33.50	55.41	26.05
5 wickets in innings	0	0	0	1
10 wickets in match	0	0	0	0
Best bowling	2/84	4/34	4/81	6/26
Catches/stumpings	1/–	3/–	3/–	15/–
- Source: Cricinfo, 1 November 2026

Gavin Hoey (born 5 November 2001) is an Irish cricketer, who bats right-handed and bowls leg breaks. He currently plays for the Leinster Lightning in the Inter-Provincial Trophy and the Pembroke Cricket Club in the Irish Senior Cup. He is the son of Conor Hoey, who is also an Irish former cricketer.

== Career ==
In May 2018, he was named in the Under-17 winter training squads ahead of the 2018 Irish cricket season. In June 2019, he was selected to play for the Ireland under-19 cricket team in the 2020 Under-19 Cricket World Cup qualifier.

In June 2021, he was added to the Leinster Lightning's squad for the 2021 Inter-Provincial Trophy. When he was named in the squad, Nigel Jones, the head coach of the team, stated that Hoey was an exciting prospect and it was an exciting opportunity for him to play in the tournament. He made his Twenty20 debut for the Leinster Lightning, on 26 June 2021. In the following match, he claimed two wickets against the North West Warriors, and was named the player of the match. Prior to his T20 debut, on 7 June 2021, he made his debut for Dublin University Cricket Club, hitting one four and two sixes.

He made his List A debut on 10 May 2022, for Leinster Lightning against Munster Reds in the 2022 Inter-Provincial Cup.

He made his first-class debut on 25 November 2023, for Ireland Emerging again West Indies Academy when Ireland Emerging team tour to West Indies.

Hoey received his first call-up for the senior Ireland set-up when he was named among the 15-man squad for a one-off Test match against Zimbabwe in July 2024.
