= Stephen Doheny =

Irish cricketer

Personal information
- Full name: Stephen Thomas Doheny
- Born: 20 August 1998 (age 28); Dublin, Ireland
- Batting: Right-handed
- Bowling: Right-arm off break
- Role: Wicket-keeper-batter

International information
- National side: Ireland (2023–present)
- Test debut (cap 32): 19 November 2025 v Bangladesh
- Last Test: 27 May 2026 v New Zealand
- ODI debut (cap 64): 18 January 2023 v Zimbabwe
- Last ODI: 4 October 2024 v South Africa
- T20I debut (cap 57): 12 January 2023 v Zimbabwe
- Last T20I: 15 January 2023 v Zimbabwe

Domestic team information
- Years: Team
- 2017–2020: Leinster Lightning
- 2018–2019: Munster Reds
- 2021–2024: North West Warriors
- 2025: Munster Reds
- 2026: Leinster Lightning

Career statistics
Competition	Test	ODI	T20I	FC
Matches	2	11	3	16
Runs scored	118	165	19	556
Batting average	29.50	18.33	6.33	21.38
100s/50s	0/1	0/1	0/0	0/3
Top score	57	84	15	58
Balls bowled	–	–	–	48
Wickets	–	–	–	1
Bowling average	–	–	–	37.00
5 wickets in innings	–	–	–	0
10 wickets in match	–	–	–	0
Best bowling	–	–	–	1/4
Catches/stumpings	0/–	3/1	2/–	13/–
- Source: Cricinfo, 29 May 2026

Stephen Thomas Doheny (born 20 August 1998) is an Irish cricketer. He made his Twenty20 debut for Leinster Lightning in the 2017 Inter-Provincial Trophy on 11 August 2017. Prior to his T20 debut, he was part of Ireland's squad for the 2016 Under-19 Cricket World Cup.

== Domestic career ==
He made his List A debut for Leinster Lightning in the 2018 Inter-Provincial Cup on 19 June 2018. He made his first-class debut for Leinster Lightning in the 2018 Inter-Provincial Championship on 20 June 2018. He was the leading run-scorer for Munster Reds in the 2018 Inter-Provincial Trophy tournament, with 193 runs in six matches.

== International career ==
In June 2019, he was named in the Ireland Wolves squad for their home series against the Scotland A cricket team. In March 2020, Doheny was added to Ireland's Twenty20 International (T20I) squad for their series against Afghanistan in India. In February 2021, Doheny was named in the Ireland Wolves squad for their tour to Bangladesh. Later the same month, Doheny was part of the intake for the Cricket Ireland Academy. Following the tour of Bangladesh, Doheny was awarded with a retainer contract, after he impressed the selectors.

In July 2021, Doheny was added to Ireland's Twenty20 International (T20I) squad for their series against South Africa, after Neil Rock tested positive for COVID-19. In June 2022, Doheny was named in Ireland's T20I squad for their two-match series against India. Later the same month, he was also named in Ireland's One Day International (ODI) squad for their series against New Zealand. In July 2022, Doheny was named in Ireland's T20I squad also for their series against New Zealand. Later the same month, Doheny was also named in Ireland's T20I squads for their matches against South Africa in Bristol, and for their home series against Afghanistan.

In December 2022, he was named in the Ireland's squad for their white-ball series against Zimbabwe. On 12 January 2023, he made his T20I debut for Ireland in the first T20I match. In October 2023, he was named as captain of an Ireland Emerging squad which toured the West Indies cricket team for a List A and First Class Cricket series against the West Indies Academy.
