= List of Ireland Twenty20 International cricket records =

A Twenty20 International (T20I) is a form of cricket, played between two of the international members of the International Cricket Council (ICC), in which each team faces a maximum of twenty overs. The matches have top-class status and are the highest T20 standard. The game is played under the rules of Twenty20 cricket. The first Twenty20 International match between two men's sides was played on 17 February 2005, involving Australia and New Zealand. Wisden Cricketers' Almanack reported that "neither side took the game especially seriously", and it was noted by Cricinfo that but for a large score for Ricky Ponting, "the concept would have shuddered". However, Ponting himself said "if it does become an international game then I'm sure the novelty won't be there all the time". This is a list of Ireland Cricket team's Twenty20 International records. It is based on the List of Twenty20 International records, but concentrates solely on records dealing with the Irishmen cricket team. Ireland played its first Twenty20 game against Bermuda in August 2008, and these records date from that game.

== Key ==
The top five records are listed for each category, except for the team wins, losses, draws and ties, all round records and the partnership records. Tied records for fifth place are also included. Explanations of the general symbols and cricketing terms used in the list are given below. Specific details are provided in each category where appropriate. All records include matches played for Ireland only, and are correct as of August 2020.

Key
Symbol	Meaning
†	Player or umpire is currently active in T20I cricket
‡	Even took place during a Cricket World Cup
*	Player remained not out or partnership remained unbroken
♠	Twenty20 International cricket record
Date	Starting date of the match
Innings	Number of innings played
Matches	Number of matches played
Opposition	The team Australia was playing against
Period	The time period when the player was active in ODI cricket
Player	The player involved in the record
Venue	Twenty20 International cricket ground where the match was played

== Team records ==
=== Overall record ===
Matches	Won	Lost	Tied	NR	Win %
188	78	99	2	9	44.41
Last Updated: 14 February 2026

=== Team wins, losses, draws and ties ===
As of February 2026, Ireland has played 188 T20I matches resulting in 78 victories, 99 defeats, 2 ties and 9 no results for an overall winning percentage of 44.41.

Opponent	Matches	Won	Lost	Tied	No Result	% Won
Full Members						
Afghanistan	26	7	18	1	0	28.84
Australia	3	0	3	0	0	0.00
Bangladesh	11	3	7	0	1	30.00
England	4	1	2	0	1	33.33
India	10	2	8	0	0	20.00
New Zealand	5	0	5	0	0	0.00
Pakistan	5	1	4	0	0	20.00
South Africa	7	1	6	0	0	14.28
Sri Lanka	4	0	4	0	0	0.00
West Indies	9	3	4	0	2	42.85
Zimbabwe	18	8	8	0	2	50.00
Associate Members
Austria	1	1	0	0	0	100.00
Bahrain	1	1	0	0	0	100.00
Bermuda	1	1	0	0	0	100.00
Canada	5	2	3	0	0	40.00
Denmark	1	1	0	0	0	100.00
Germany	1	1	0	0	0	100.00
Hong Kong	4	2	2	0	0	50.00
Italy	4	3	1	0	0	75.00
Jersey	2	2	0	0	0	100.00
Kenya	5	5	0	0	0	100.00
Namibia	2	1	1	0	0	50.00
Nepal	3	3	0	0	0	100.00
Netherlands	15	7	7	0	1	50.00
Nigeria	1	1	0	0	0	100.00
Oman	7	5	2	0	0	71.42
Papua New Guinea	4	2	2	0	0	50.00
Scotland	16	9	4	1	2	67.85
United Arab Emirates	13	6	7	0	0	46.15
United States	2	1	1	0	0	50.00
Total	188	78	99	2	9	44.41
Statistics are correct as of January 2026.

=== First bilateral T20I series wins ===
Opponent	Year of first Home win	Year of first Away/Neutral win
Afghanistan	2022	—
Bangladesh	—	—
England	—	YTP
Hong Kong	—	YTP
India	2026	YTP
Italy	YTP	2026
Kenya	YTP	2011
New Zealand	—	YTP
Pakistan	—	YTP
Papua New Guinea	YTP	2016
Scotland	—	YTP
South Africa	—	YTP
United Arab Emirates	YTP	2026
United States	YTP	—
West Indies	—	—
Zimbabwe	2021	2023
Last Updated: 28 June 2026

=== First T20I match wins ===
Opponent	Home		Away / Neutral	
Opponent	Venue	Year	Venue	Year
Afghanistan	Stormont Cricket Ground, Belfast, Northern Ireland	2022	Paikiasothy Saravanamuttu Stadium, Colombo, Sri Lanka	2010
Australia	YTP	YTP	—	—
Austria	YTP	YTP	The Grange Club, Edinburgh, Scotland	2023
Bahrain	YTP	YTP	Oman Cricket Academy Ground Turf 2, Muscat, Oman	2022
Bangladesh	—	—	Trent Bridge, Nottingham, England	2009
Bermuda	Stormont Cricket Ground, Belfast, Northern Ireland	2008	YTP	YTP
Canada	YTP	YTP	Dubai International Cricket Stadium, Dubai, UAE	2012
England	—	—	Melbourne Cricket Ground, Melbourne, Australia	2022
Germany	YTP	YTP	Oman Cricket Academy Ground Turf 1, Muscat, Oman	2022
Hong Kong	YTP	YTP	Oman Cricket Academy Ground, Muscat, Oman	2019
India	Stormont Cricket Ground, Belfast, Northern Ireland	2026	—	—
Italy	YTP	YTP	Goldenacre Sports Ground, Edinburgh, Scotland	2023
Jersey	YTP	YTP	Tolerance Oval, Abu Dhabi, UAE	2019
Kenya	Stormont Cricket Ground, Belfast, Northern Ireland	2008	Mombasa Sports Club, Mombasa, Kenya	2012
Namibia	YTP	YTP	Oman Cricket Academy Ground, Muscat, Oman	2019
Nepal	Stormont Cricket Ground, Belfast, Northern Ireland	2015	Oman Cricket Academy Ground, Muscat, Oman	2019
Netherlands	—	—	Dubai International Cricket Stadium, Dubai, UAE	2010
New Zealand	YTP	YTP	—	—
Nigeria	YTP	YTP	Sheikh Zayed Cricket Stadium, Abu Dhabi, UAE	2019
Oman	YTP	YTP	Oman Cricket Academy Ground, Muscat, Oman	2019
Pakistan	Castle Avenue, Dublin, Ireland	2024	-	-
Papua New Guinea	—	—	Riverway Stadium, Townsville, Australia	2016
Scotland	Stormont Cricket Ground, Belfast, Northern Ireland	2008	Dubai International Cricket Stadium, Dubai, UAE	2010
South Africa	—	—	Sheikh Zayed Cricket Stadium, Abu Dhabi, United Arab Emirates	2024
Sri Lanka	YTP	YTP	—	—
United Arab Emirates	YTP	YTP	Sylhet International Cricket Stadium, Sylhet, Bangladesh	2014
United States	YTP	YTP	Central Broward Park, Lauderhill, United States	2021
West Indies	—	—	Sabina Park, Kingston, Jamaica	2014
Zimbabwe	Bready Cricket Club Ground, Magheramason, Northern Ireland	2019	Sylhet International Cricket Stadium, Sylhet, Bangladesh	2014
Last Updated: January 2026

=== Team scoring records ===
==== Most runs in an innings ====
Rank	Score	Opposition	Venue	Date
1	235/5	Oman	Sinhalese Sports Club Cricket Ground, Colombo, Sri Lanka	14 February 2026 ‡
2	226/4	Austria	The Grange Club, Edinburgh, Scotland	21 July 2023
3	225/7	Afghanistan	Sheikh Zayed Cricket Stadium, Abu Dhabi, UAE	30 November 2013
4	221/5	India	Malahide Cricket Club Ground, Dublin, Ireland	28 June 2022
5	211/6	Scotland	Dubai International Cricket Stadium, Dubai, UAE	20 January 2017
Last Updated: 14 February 2026

==== Fewest runs in an innings ====
The lowest innings total scored was by Turkey against Czech Republic when they were dismissed for 21 during the 2019 Continental Cup. The lowest score in T20I history for Ireland is 68 scored against the West Indies in the 2010 ICC World Twenty20.

Rank	Score	Opposition	Venue	Date
1	68	West Indies	Providence Stadium, Providence, Guyana	30 April 2010 ‡
2	70	India	Malahide Cricket Club Ground, Dublin, Ireland	29 June 2018
3	71	Afghanistan	Dubai International Cricket Stadium, Dubai, UAE	20 January 2017
4	79	Afghanistan	Bready Cricket Club Ground, Magheramason, Northern Ireland	22 August 2018
5	85/8	West Indies	Sabina Park, Kingston, Jamaica	21 February 2014
Last Updated: 26 January 2026

==== Most runs conceded in an innings ====
The 2nd T20I of the Ireland series in India in February 2019 saw Afghanistan score 278/3, the highest total conceded by Ireland.

Rank	Score	Opposition	Venue	Date
1	278/3	Afghanistan	Rajiv Gandhi International Cricket Stadium, Dehradun, India	23 February 2019
2	256/5	West Indies	Bready Cricket Club, Magheramason, Northern Ireland	15 June 2025
3	233/8	Afghanistan	Greater Noida Sports Complex Ground, Greater Noida, India	10 March 2017
4	225/7	India	Malahide Cricket Club Ground, Dublin, Ireland	28 June 2022
5	213/4	India	Malahide Cricket Club Ground, Dublin, Ireland	29 June 2018
5	213/6	Scotland	The Grange Club, Edinburgh, Scotland	28 July 2023
Last Updated: 26 January 2026

==== Fewest runs conceded in an innings ====
The lowest score conceded by Ireland in an innings is 53 when they dismissed Nepal during the 2015 ICC World Twenty20 Qualifier at Civil Service Cricket Club Ground, Belfast, Northern Ireland.

Rank	Score	Opposition	Venue	Date
1	53	Nepal	Civil Service Cricket Club Ground, Belfast, Northern Ireland	13 July 2015
2	66/9	Nigeria	Sheikh Zayed Cricket Stadium, Abu Dhabi, UAE	26 October 2019
3	67	Kenya	Civil Service Cricket Club Ground, Belfast, Northern Ireland	4 August 2008
4	71	Kenya	Dubai International Cricket Stadium, Dubai, UAE	14 March 2012
5	78/9	Jersey	Goldenacre Sports Ground, Edinburgh, Scotland	24 July 2023
Last Updated: 26 January 2026

==== Highest match aggregates ====
The highest aggregate involving Ireland was 472 runs being scored in Dehradun in the 2nd T20I of the Ireland series in India in February 2019,

Rank	Aggregate	Scores	Venue	Date
1	472/9	Afghanistan (278/3) v Ireland (194/6)	Rajiv Gandhi International Cricket Stadium, Dehradun, India	23 February 2019
2	450/12	West Indies (256/5) v Ireland (194/7)	Bready Cricket Club, Magheramason, Northern Ireland	15 June 2025
3	446/12	India (225/7) v Ireland (221/5)	Malahide Cricket Club Ground, Dublin, Ireland	28 June 2022
4	438/18	Afghanistan (233/8) v Ireland (205)	Greater Noida Sports Complex Ground, Greater Noida, India	12 March 2017
5	418/15	Scotland (213/6) v Ireland (205/9)	The Grange Club, Edinburgh, Scotland	28 July 2023
Last Updated: 26 January 2026

==== Lowest match aggregates ====
The lowest match aggregate in T20I history for Ireland is 84 scored during the 2008 ICC World Twenty20 Qualifier.

Rank	Aggregate	Scores	Venue	Date
1	84/15	Ireland (43/7) v Bermuda (41/8)	Civil Service Cricket Club Ground, Belfast, Northern Ireland	3 August 2008
2	106/12	Netherlands (59/5) v Ireland (47/7)	Himachal Pradesh Cricket Association Stadium, Dharamshala, India	13 March 2016 ‡
3	107/12	Nepal (53) v Ireland (54/2)	Civil Service Cricket Club Ground, Belfast, Northern Ireland	13 July 2015
4	133/11	Nigeria (66/9) v Ireland (67/2)	Sheikh Zayed Cricket Stadium, Abu Dhabi, UAE	26 October 2019
5	139/16	Kenya (67) v Ireland (72/6)	Civil Service Cricket Club Ground, Belfast, Northern Ireland	4 August 2008
Last Updated: 26 January 2026

=== Result records ===
A T20I match is won when one side has scored more runs than the runs scored by the opposing side during their innings. If both sides have completed both their allocated innings and the side that fielded last has the higher aggregate of runs, it is known as a win by runs. This indicates the number of runs that they had scored more than the opposing side. If the side batting last wins the match, it is known as a win by wickets, indicating the number of wickets that were still to fall.

==== Greatest win margins (by runs) ====
The greatest winning margin by runs in T20Is was Czech Republic's victory over Turkey by 257 runs in the sixth match of the 2019 Continental Cup. The largest victory recorded by Ireland was against Austria in the 2024 ICC Men's T20 World Cup Europe Qualifier.

Rank	Margin	Opposition	Venue	Date
1	128 runs	Austria	The Grange Club, Edinburgh, Scotland	23 July 2023
2	98 runs	Scotland	Dubai International Cricket Stadium, Dubai, UAE	20 January 2017
3	96 runs	Oman	Sinhalese Sports Club Cricket Ground, Colombo, Sri Lanka	14 February 2026 ‡
4	68 runs	Afghanistan	Sheikh Zayed Cricket Stadium, Abu Dhabi, UAE	30 November 2013
5	66 runs	Hong Kong	Al Amerat Cricket Stadium, Muscat, Oman	7 October 2019
Last Updated: 14 February 2026

==== Greatest win margins (by balls remaining) ====
The greatest winning margin by balls remaining in T20Is was Austria's victory over Turkey by 104 balls remaining in the ninth match of the 2019 Continental Cup. The largest victory recorded by Ireland is during the 2019 ICC World Twenty20 Qualifier against Nigeria when they won by 8 wickets with 83 balls remaining.

Rank	Balls remaining	Margin	Opposition	Venue	Date
1	83	8 wickets	Nigeria	Sheikh Zayed Cricket Stadium, Abu Dhabi, UAE	26 October 2019
2	76	10 wickets	Kenya	Dubai International Cricket Stadium, Dubai, UAE	14 March 2012
3	72	8 wickets	Nepal	Civil Service Cricket Club Ground, Belfast, Northern Ireland	13 July 2015
4	63	10 wickets	Canada	Dubai International Cricket Stadium, Dubai, UAE	22 March 2012
5	58	9 wickets	Jersey	Goldenacre Sports Ground, Edinburgh, Scotland	24 July 2023
Last Updated: 26 January 2026

==== Greatest win margins (by wickets) ====
A total of 50 matches have ended with chasing team winning by 10 wickets. Ireland have won a T20I match by this margin on two occasions.

Rank	Margin	Opposition	Venue	Date
1	10 wickets	Kenya	Dubai International Cricket Stadium, Dubai, UAE	14 March 2012
1	10 wickets	Canada	Dubai International Cricket Stadium, Dubai, UAE	22 March 2012
3	9 wickets	Zimbabwe	Bready Cricket Club Ground, Magheramason, Northern Ireland	12 July 2019
3	9 wickets	Oman	Al Amerat Cricket Stadium, Al Amerat, Oman	12 February 2022
3	9 wickets	West Indies	Bellerive Oval, Hobart, Australia	21 October 2022
3	9 wickets	Denmark	The Grange Club, Edinburgh, Scotland	21 July 2023
3	9 wickets	Jersey	Goldenacre Sports Ground, Edinburgh, Scotland	24 July 2023
Last updated: 26 January 2026

==== Highest successful run chases ====
Australia holds the record for the highest successful run chase which they achieved when they scored 245/5 in response to New Zealand's 243/6. The highest successful chase for Ireland was in the third match of the 2019–20 Ireland Tri-Nation Series against Scotland when they scored 194/6 to win by four wickets.

Rank	Score	Target	Opposition	Venue	Date
1	194/6	194	Scotland	Malahide Cricket Club Ground, Dublin, Ireland	17 September 2019
2	183/9	183	Netherlands	Al Amerat Cricket Stadium, Muscat, Oman	17 February 2019
3	183/5	182	Pakistan	Castle Avenue, Dublin, Ireland	10 May 2024
4	180/4	177	Scotland	Bellerive Oval, Hobart, Australia	19 October 2022
5	171/3	169	Afghanistan	Civil Service Cricket Club Ground, Belfast	9 August 2022
Last Updated: 26 January 2026

==== Narrowest win margins (by runs) ====
The narrowest run margin victory is by 1 run which has been achieved in 34 T20I's with Ireland winning such games twice.

Rank	Margin	Opposition	Venue	Date
1	1 run	Scotland	Malahide Cricket Club Ground, Dublin, Ireland	20 September 2019
1	1 run	Netherlands	Sportpark Westvliet, The Hague, Netherlands	19 May 2024
3	2 runs	Kenya	Mombasa Sports Club Ground, Mombasa, Kenya	24 February 2012
3	2 runs	Canada	Sheikh Zayed Cricket Stadium, Abu Dhabi, UAE	16 November 2013
5	3 runs	Netherlands	Sportpark Westvliet, The Hague, Netherlands	24 May 2024
Last Updated: 26 January 2026

==== Narrowest win margins (by balls remaining) ====
The narrowest winning margin by balls remaining in T20Is is by winning of the last ball which has been achieved 62 times. Ireland has achieve victory of the last ball on two occasions.

Rank	Balls remaining	Margin	Opposition	Venue	Date
1	0	3 wickets	Zimbabwe	Sylhet International Cricket Stadium, Sylhet, Bangladesh	17 March 2014 ‡
1	0	1 wickets	Netherlands	Al Amerat Cricket Stadium, Muscat, Oman	17 February 2019
3	1	4 wickets	Scotland	Civil Service Cricket Club Ground, Belfast, Northern Ireland	2 August 2008
3	1	7 wickets	Afghanistan	Civil Service Cricket Club Ground, Belfast, Northern Ireland	4 August 2008
3	1	5 wickets	Pakistan	Castle Avenue cricket ground, Dublin, Ireland	10 May 2024
Last Updated: 26 January 2026

==== Narrowest win margins (by wickets) ====
The narrowest margin of victory by wickets is 1 wicket which has settled four such T20Is with Ireland being victors on one of those occasions.

Rank	Margin	Opposition	Venue	Date
1	1 wicket	Netherlands	Al Amerat Cricket Stadium, Muscat, Oman	17 February 2019
2	3 wickets	Zimbabwe	Sylhet International Cricket Stadium, Sylhet, Bangladesh	17 March 2014 ‡
3	4 wickets	Scotland	Civil Service Cricket Club Ground, Belfast, Northern Ireland	2 August 2008
3	4 wickets	Kenya	Civil Service Cricket Club Ground, Belfast, Northern Ireland	4 August 2008 ‡
3	4 wickets	Scotland	Malahide Cricket Club Ground, Dublin, Ireland	17 September 2019
3	4 wickets	Zimbabwe	Harare Sports Club, Harare, Zimbabwe	9 December 2023
Last Updated: 26 January 2026

==== Greatest loss margins (by runs) ====
Ireland's biggest defeat by runs was against India was during the India's tour of Ireland in 2018 by 143 runs at Malahide Cricket Club Ground, Dublin, Ireland.

Rank	Margin	Opposition	Venue	Date
1	143 runs	India	Malahide Cricket Club Ground, Dublin, Ireland	29 June 2018
2	88 runs	New Zealand	Civil Service Cricket Club, Belfast, Northern Ireland	20 July 2022
3	84 runs	Afghanistan	Rajiv Gandhi International Cricket Stadium, Dehradun, India	23 February 2019
4	83 runs	New Zealand	Trent Bridge, Nottingham, England	11 June 2009 ‡
5	81 runs	Afghanistan	Bready Cricket Club Ground, Magheramason, Northern Ireland	22 August 2018
Last Updated: 26 January 2026

==== Greatest loss margins (by balls remaining) ====
The largest defeat suffered by Ireland was against Afghanistan during the final of the 2017 Desert T20 Challenge at Dubai International Cricket Stadium, Dubai, UAE when they lost by 10 wickets with 73 balls remaining.

Rank	Balls remaining	Margin	Opposition	Venue	Date
1	73	10 wickets	Afghanistan	Dubai International Cricket Stadium, Dubai, UAE	20 January 2017
2	54	9 wickets	West Indies	Warner Park, Basseterre, Saint Kitts and Nevis	19 January 2020
3	38	8 wickets	Bangladesh	Bir Shrestho Flight Lieutenant Matiur Rahman Cricket Stadium, Chattogram, Bangladesh	2 December 2025
4	37	6 wickets	Netherlands	Sylhet International Cricket Stadium, Sylhet, Bangladesh	21 March 2014 ‡
5	30	9 wickets	Sri Lanka	Bellerive Oval, Hobart, Australia	13 October 2022
Last Updated: 26 January 2026

==== Greatest loss margins (by wickets) ====
Ireland have lost a T20I match by a margin of 10 wickets on one occasion.

Rank	Margins	Opposition	Most recent venue	Date
1	10 wickets	Afghanistan	Dubai International Cricket Stadium, Dubai, UAE	20 January 2017
2	9 wickets	West Indies	Warner Park, Basseterre, Saint Kitts and Nevis	19 January 2020
2	9 wickets	Sri Lanka	Bellerive Oval, Hobart, Australia	23 October 2022
4	8 wickets	India	Trent Bridge, Nottingham, England	10 June 2009 ‡
4	8 wickets	Afghanistan	Dubai International Cricket Stadium, Dubai, UAE	13 February 2010
4	8 wickets	Zimbabwe	Bready Cricket Club Ground, Magheramason, Northern Ireland	14 July 2019
4	8 wickets	Namibia	Sharjah Cricket Stadium, Sharjah, UAE	22 October 2021
4	8 wickets	India	Nassau County International Cricket Stadium, East Meadow, United States	5 June 2024 ‡
4	8 wickets	South Africa	Sheikh Zayed Cricket Stadium, Abu Dhabi, UAE	27 September 2024
4	8 wickets	Bangladesh	Bir Shrestho Flight Lieutenant Matiur Rahman Cricket Stadium, Chattogram, Bangladesh	2 December 2025
Last Updated: 26 January 2026

==== Narrowest loss margins (by runs) ====
The narrowest loss of Ireland in terms of runs is by 1 runs suffered once.

Rank	Margin	Opposition	Venue	Date
1	1 runs	Bangladesh	Civil Service Cricket Club Ground, Belfast, Northern Ireland	20 July 2012
2	2 runs	India	Malahide Cricket Club Ground, Dublin, Ireland	18 August 2023
3	3 runs	Zimbabwe	Castle Avenue, Dublin, Ireland	27 August 2021
4	4 runs	Canada	Sinhalese Sports Club Ground, Colombo, Sri Lanka	3 February 2010
4	4 runs	Netherlands	Hazelaarweg Stadion, Rotterdam, Netherlands	12 June 2018
4	4 runs	India	Malahide Cricket Club Ground, Dublin, Ireland	28 June 2022
Last Updated: 26 January 2026

==== Narrowest loss margins (by balls remaining) ====
Ireland has suffered loss off the last ball twice.

Rank	Balls remaining	Margin	Opposition	Venue	Date
1	0	2 wickets	Bangladesh	Civil Service Cricket Club Ground, Belfast, Northern Ireland	21 July 2012
1	0	1 wicket	Zimbabwe	Harare Sports Club, Harare, Zimbabwe	7 December 2023
3	2	2 wickets	Oman	Himachal Pradesh Cricket Association Stadium, Dharamshala, India	9 March 2016 ‡
3	2	4 wickets	Bangladesh	Bir Shrestho Flight Lieutenant Matiur Rahman Cricket Stadium, Chattogram, Bangladesh	29 November 2025
5	4	5 wickets	Afghanistan	Rajiv Gandhi International Cricket Stadium, Dehradun, India	21 February 2019
5	4	3 wickets	Zimbabwe	Harare Sports Club, Harare, Zimbabwe	23 February 2025
Last Updated: 26 January 2026

==== Narrowest loss margins (by wickets) ====
Ireland has suffered defeat by 1 wicket once.

Rank	Margin	Opposition	Venue	Date
1	1 wicket	Zimbabwe	Harare Sports Club, Harare, Zimbabwe	7 December 2023
2	2 wickets	Bangladesh	Civil Service Cricket Club Ground, Belfast, Northern Ireland	21 July 2012
2	2 wickets	Papua New Guinea	Civil Service Cricket Club Ground, Belfast, Northern Ireland	15 July 2015
2	2 wickets	Oman	Himachal Pradesh Cricket Association Stadium, Dharamshala, India	9 March 2016 ‡
5	3 wickets	Pakistan	Central Broward Park, Lauderhill, United States	16 June 2024 ‡
5	3 wickets	Zimbabwe	Harare Sports Club, Harare, Zimbabwe	23 February 2025
Last Updated: 26 January 2026

==== Tied matches ====
A tie can occur when the scores of both teams are equal at the conclusion of play, provided that the side batting last has completed their innings. There have been 44 ties in T20Is history with Ireland involved in two such games.

Opposition	Venue	Date
Scotland	Sportpark Het Schootsveld, Deventer, Netherlands	17 June 2018
Afghanistan	Greater Noida Sports Complex Ground, Greater Noida, India	10 March 2020
Last updated: 26 January 2026

== Individual records ==
=== Batting records ===
==== Most career runs ====
A run is the basic means of scoring in cricket. A run is scored when the batsman hits the ball with his bat and with his partner runs the length of 22 yards (20 m) of the pitch. Paul Stirling is the leading Irishman on this list.

Rank	Runs	Player	Matches	Innings	Average	100	50	Period
1	3,895	Paul Stirling†	163	160	26.31	1	24	2009–2026
2	2,392	Andrew Balbirnie	110	106	23.45	0	12	2015-2024
3	1,973	Kevin O'Brien	110	103	21.21	1	5	2008-2021
4	1,845	Harry Tector†	98	90	24.93	0	8	2019-2026
5	1,730	Lorcan Tucker†	91	85	22.76	0	11	2016-2026
Last Updated: 14 February 2026

==== Most runs in each batting position ====
Batting position	Batsman	Innings	Runs	Average	Career Span	Ref
Opener	Paul Stirling†	156	3,818	26.51	2010–2026	
Number 3	Andrew Balbirnie	43	1,125	27.43	2015–2021	
Number 4	Harry Tector†	55	1,065	23.15	2019–2025	
Number 5	Curtis Campher†	43	770	20.26	2021–2026	
Number 6	George Dockrell†	47	679	19.40	2019–2026	
Number 7	Gareth Delany†	27	367	17.47	2019–2026	
Number 8	Mark Adair†	35	448	16.00	2019–2026	
Number 9	Mark Adair†	13	147	13.36	2019–2026	
Number 10	Barry McCarthy†	15	137	17.12	2017–2026	
Number 11	Josh Little†	18	68	9.71	2019–2025	
Last Updated: 14 February 2026

==== Most runs against each team ====
Opposition	Runs	Batsman	Innings	Career Span	Ref
Afghanistan	667	Paul Stirling†	25	2010–2024	
Australia	95	Lorcan Tucker†	2	2022–2026	
Austria	94	Lorcan Tucker†	1	2023–2023	
Bahrain	51	Gareth Delany†	1	2023–2023	
Bangladesh	229	Paul Stirling†	9	2012–2025	
Bermuda	7	Gary Wilson	1	2008–2008	
Canada	131	Paul Stirling†	5	2010–2024	
Denmark	55	Paul Stirling†	1	2023–2023	
England	90	Lorcan Tucker†	3	2022–2025	
Germany	34	Paul Stirling†	1	2022–2022	
Hong Kong	161	Kevin O'Brien	4	2015–2019	
India	161	Andrew Balbirnie	7	2018–2024	
Italy	191	Harry Tector†	4	2023–2026	
Jersey	93	Paul Stirling†	2	2019–2023	
Kenya	92	Paul Stirling†	4	2012–2012	
Namibia	67	Andrew Balbirnie	2	2019–2021	
Nepal	90	Paul Stirling†	3	2015–2022	
Netherlands	254	Kevin O'Brien	12	2008–2021	
New Zealand	111	Paul Stirling†	4	2022–2022	
Nigeria	32	Kevin O'Brien	1	2019–2019	
Oman	215	Gareth Delany†	5	2019–2026	
Pakistan	130	Lorcan Tucker†	4	2024–2024	
Papua New Guinea	102	William Porterfield	3	2015–2015	
Scotland	309	Paul Stirling†	8	2012–2024	
South Africa	143	Paul Stirling†	7	2021–2024	
Sri Lanka	88	Harry Tector†	3	2021–2026	
United Arab Emirates	310	Paul Stirling†	13	2014–2026	
United States	141	Lorcan Tucker†	2	2021–2021	
West Indies	223	Paul Stirling†	9	2010–2025	
Zimbabwe	408	Paul Stirling†	13	2014–2025	
Last updated: 14 February 2026

==== Highest individual score ====
Kevin O'Brien is the highest scorer for Ireland in T20Is.

Rank	Runs	Player	Opposition	Venue	Date
1	124	Kevin O'Brien	Hong Kong	Al Amerat Cricket Stadium, Muscat, Oman	7 October 2019
2	115*	Paul Stirling	Zimbabwe	Bready Cricket Club Ground, Magheramason, Northern Ireland	1 September 2021
3	100	Ross Adair	South Africa	Sheikh Zayed Cricket Stadium, Abu Dhabi, United Arab Emirates	29 September 2024
4	96*	Harry Tector	Italy	The Sevens Stadium, Dubai, United Arab Emirates	25 January 2026
5	95	Paul Stirling	West Indies	National Cricket Stadium, St. George's, Grenada	15 January 2020
Last Updated: 26 January 2026

==== Highest individual score – progression of record ====
Runs	Player	Opponent	Venue	Season
38	Andre Botha	Scotland	Civil Service Cricket Club Ground, Belfast, Northern Ireland	2 August 2008
40	Niall O'Brien	Bangladesh	Trent Bridge, Nottingham, England	8 June 2009 ‡
40	William Porterfield	Pakistan	The Oval, London, England	15 June 2009 ‡
46	William Porterfield	Afghanistan	Paikiasothy Saravanamuttu Stadium, Colombo, Sri Lanka	1 February 2010
50	Niall O'Brien	Canada	Sinhalese Sports Club Ground, Colombo, Sri Lanka	3 February 2010
65	Alex Cusack	Netherlands	Dubai International Cricket Stadium, Dubai, UAE	13 February 2010
65*	Paul Stirling†	Kenya	Mombasa Sports Club Ground, Mombasa, Kenya	23 February 2012
78*	Ed Joyce	Scotland	Dubai International Cricket Stadium, Dubai, UAE	18 March 2012
79	Paul Stirling†	Afghanistan	Dubai International Cricket Stadium, Dubai, UAE	24 March 2012
81	Paul Stirling†	Scotland	Sportpark Het Schootsveld, Deventer, Netherlands	17 June 2018
83	Andrew Balbirnie†	Netherlands	Al Amerat Cricket Stadium, Muscat, Oman	17 February 2019
91	Paul Stirling†	Afghanistan	Rajiv Gandhi International Cricket Stadium, Dehradun, India	23 February 2019
124	Kevin O'Brien†	Hong Kong	Al Amerat Cricket Stadium, Muscat, Oman	7 October 2019
Last Updated: 26 January 2026

==== Highest score against each opponent ====
Opposition	Player	Score	Date
Afghanistan	Paul Stirling	91	23 February 2019
Australia	Lorcan Tucker	71*	31 October 2022
Austria	Lorcan Tucker	94*	23 July 2023
Bahrain	Gareth Delany	51*	19 February 2022
Bangladesh	Paul Stirling	77	31 March 2023
Bermuda	Gary Wilson	7	3 August 2008
Canada	Paul Stirling	61*	22 March 2012
Denmark	Paul Stirling	55	21 July 2023
England	Andrew Balbirnie	62	26 October 2022
Germany	Paul Stirling	34	21 February 2022
Hong Kong	Kevin O'Brien	124	7 October 2019
India	Andrew Balbirnie	72	20 August 2023
Italy	Harry Tector	96*	25 January 2026
Jersey	Paul Stirling	58*	25 October 2019
Kenya	Paul Stirling	65*	23 February 2012
Namibia	Andrew Balbirnie	46	2 November 2019
Nepal	Paul Stirling	59	9 October 2019
Netherlands	Andrew Balbirnie	83	17 February 2019
New Zealand	Paul Stirling	40	22 July 2022
Nigeria	Kevin O'Brien	32	26 October 2019
Oman	Lorcan Tucker	94*	14 February 2026
Pakistan	Andrew Balbirnie	77	10 May 2024
Papua New Guinea	William Porterfield	57*	15 July 2015
Scotland	Paul Stirling	81	17 June 2018
South Africa	Ross Adair	100	29 September 2024
Sri Lanka	Harry Tector	45	23 October 2022
United Arab Emirates	William Porterfield	72	16 February 2016
United Arab Emirates	Paul Stirling	72	19 October 2019
United States	Lorcan Tucker	84	23 December 2021
West Indies	Paul Stirling	95	15 January 2020
Zimbabwe	Paul Stirling	115*	1 September 2021
Last Updated: 14 February 2026

==== Highest career average ====
A batsman's batting average is the total number of runs they have scored divided by the number of times they have been dismissed.

Rank	Average	Player	Innings	Runs	Not out	Period
1	26.31	Paul Stirling†	160	3,895	12	2009–2026
2	24.93	Harry Tector†	90	1,845	16	2019–2026
3	23.95	Ross Adair†	21	503	0	2023–2026
4	23.45	Andrew Balbirnie	106	2,392	4	2015–2024
5	22.76	Lorcan Tucker†	85	1,730	9	2016–2026
Qualification: 20 innings. Last Updated: 14 February 2026

==== Highest Average in each batting position ====
Batting position	Batsman	Innings	Runs	Average	Career Span	Ref
Opener	Kevin O'Brien	43	1,198	27.86	2019–2021	
Number 3	Harry Tector †	17	489	34.92	2024–2026	
Number 4	Curtis Campher †	5	169	28.16	2021–2025	
Number 5	George Dockrell †	9	146	48.66	2019–2025	
Number 6	Gareth Delany †	9	106	35.33	2019–2026	
Number 7	Curtis Campher †	6	93	31.00	2022–2024	
Number 8	Stuart Poynter	7	68	34.00	2015–2019	
Number 9	Mark Adair †	13	147	13.36	2019–2026	
Number 10	Josh Little †	9	46	23.00	2016–2026	
Number 11	Ben White †	10	27	13.50	2021–2025	
Qualification: 5 innings. Last Updated: 8 February 2026

==== Most half-centuries ====
A half-century is a score of between 50 and 99 runs. Statistically, once a batsman's score reaches 100, it is no longer considered a half-century but a century..

Rank	Half centuries	Player	Innings	Runs	Period
1	24	Paul Stirling†	160	3,895	2009-2026
2	12	Andrew Balbirnie	106	2,392	2015-2024
3	11	Lorcan Tucker†	85	1,730	2016-2026
4	8	Harry Tector†	90	1,845	2019-2026
5	6	Kevin O'Brien	103	1,973	2008-2021
Last Updated: 14 February 2026

==== Most centuries ====
A century is a score of 100 or more runs in a single innings.

Rank	Centuries	Player	Innings	Period
1	1	Ross Adair †	19	2023-2026
1	1	Kevin O'Brien	103	2008-2021
1	1	Paul Stirling †	159	2009-2026
Last Updated: 8 February 2026

==== Most Sixes ====
Rank	Sixes	Player	Innings	Period
1	141	Paul Stirling†	160	2009-2026
2	82	Kevin O'Brien	103	2008-2021
3	68	Andrew Balbirnie	106	2015-2024
4	58	Gareth Delany†	77	2019-2026
5	54	George Dockrell†	107	2010-2026
Last Updated: 14 February 2026

==== Most Fours ====
Rank	Fours	Player	Innings	Period
1	449	Paul Stirling†	160	2009-2026
2	254	Andrew Balbirnie	106	2015-2024
3	165	Kevin O'Brien	103	2008-2021
4	161	Lorcan Tucker†	85	2016-2026
5	153	Harry Tector†	90	2019-2026
Last Updated: 14 February 2026

==== Highest strike rates ====
Rank	Strike rate	Player	Runs	Balls Faced	Period
1	139.33	Ross Adair†	503	361	2023–2026
2	134.35	Paul Stirling†	3,895	2,899	2009–2026
3	133.87	Gareth Delany†	1,245	930	2019–2026
4	133.20	George Dockrell†	1,388	1,042	2010–2026
5	130.92	Kevin O'Brien	1,973	1,507	2008–2021
Qualification= 250 balls faced. Last Updated: 14 February 2026

==== Highest strike rates in an innings ====
Rank	Strike rate	Player	Runs	Balls Faced	Opposition	Venue	Date
1	388.88	George Dockrell	35*	9	Oman	Sinhalese Sports Club Ground, Colombo, Sri Lanka	14 February 2026 ‡
2	280.00	Gareth Delany	28*	10	Pakistan	Castle Avenue cricket ground, Dublin, Ireland	12 May 2024
3	262.50	Kevin O'Brien	42*	16	Netherlands	Sylhet International Cricket Stadium, Sylhet, Bangladesh	21 March 2014 ‡
4	253.33	Mark Adair	38	15	Zimbabwe	Bready Cricket Club Ground, Magheramason, Northern Ireland	14 July 2019
5	250.00	Gareth Delany	25	10	Scotland	Malahide Cricket Club Ground, Dublin, Ireland	20 September 2019
Last Updated: 14 February 2026

==== Most runs in a calendar year ====
Paul Stirling of Ireland holds the Irish record for most runs scored in a calendar year with 748 runs scored in 2019.

Rank	Runs	Player	Matches	Innings	Year
1	748	Paul Stirling	20	20	2019
2	729	Kevin O'Brien	23	23	2019
3	617	Andrew Balbirnie	27	27	2022
4	601	Andrew Balbirnie	21	20	2019
5	575	Paul Stirling	27	27	2022
Last Updated: 8 February 2026

==== Most runs in a series ====
The 2014 ICC World Twenty20 in Bangladesh saw Virat Kohli set the record for the most runs scored in a single series scoring 319 runs. He is followed by Tillakaratne Dilshan with 317 runs scored in the 2009 ICC World Twenty20. Stirling also holds the Irish record for most runs in a serie with 291 runs in the 2019 ICC Men's T20 World Cup Qualifier.

Rank	Runs	Player	Matches	Innings	Series
1	291	Paul Stirling †	8	8	2019 ICC Men's T20 World Cup Qualifier
2	234	Paul Stirling †	5	5	Zimbabwe in Ireland in 2021
3	204	Lorcan Tucker †	7	7	2022 Men's T20 World Cup
4	191	Kevin O'Brien	4	4	2019–20 Oman Pentangular Series
5	188	Paul Stirling †	5	5	2012 ICC World Twenty20 Qualifier
Last Updated: 8 February 2026

==== Most ducks ====
A duck refers to a batsman being dismissed without scoring a run.

Rank	Ducks	Player	Innings	Period
1	14	Paul Stirling†	160	2009–2026
2	12	Kevin O'Brien	103	2008–2021
3	9	George Dockrell†	107	2010–2026
4	8	Simi Singh	40	2018–2022
4	8	Barry McCarthy†	41	2017–2026
4	8	Lorcan Tucker†	85	2016–2026
Last Updated: 14 February 2026

=== Bowling records ===
==== Most career wickets ====
A bowler takes the wicket of a batsman when the form of dismissal is bowled, caught, leg before wicket, stumped or hit wicket. If the batsman is dismissed by run out, obstructing the field, handling the ball, hitting the ball twice or timed out the bowler does not receive credit.

Rank	Wickets	Player	Matches	Innings	Period
1	140	Mark Adair †	98	98	2019-2026
2	89	George Dockrell †	155	98	2010-2026
3	87	Craig Young †	73	71	2015-2026
4	82	Josh Little †	76	75	2016-2026
5	71	Barry McCarthy †	67	67	2017-2026
Last Updated: 8 February 2026

==== Best figures in an innings ====
Bowling figures refers to the number of the wickets a bowler has taken and the number of runs conceded.

Rank	Figures	Player	Opposition	Venue	Date
1	4/11	Alex Cusack	West Indies	Sabina Park, Kingston, Jamaica	21 February 2014
2	4/13	Craig Young	Nigeria	Sheikh Zayed Cricket Stadium, Abu Dhabi, UAE	26 October 2019
2	4/13	Mark Adair	Austria	The Grange Club, Edinburgh, Scotland	23 July 2023
2	4/13	Matthew Humphreys	Bangladesh	Bir Shrestho Flight Lieutenant Matiur Rahman Cricket Stadium, Chattogram, Bangladesh	27 November 2025
5	4/16	Jacob Mulder	Scotland	Dubai International Cricket Stadium, Dubai, UAE	20 January 2017
5	4/16	Matthew Humphreys	Italy	The Sevens Stadium, Dubai, UAE	23 January 2026
Last Updated: 8 February 2026

==== Best figures in an innings – progression of record ====
Figures	Player	Opposition	Venue	Date
4/21	Alex Cusack	Scotland	Civil Service Cricket Club Ground, Belfast, Northern Ireland	2 August 2008
4/18	Alex Cusack	Sri Lanka	Lord's, London, England	14 June 2009 ‡
4/11	Alex Cusack	West Indies	Sabina Park, Kingston, Jamaica	21 February 2014 ‡
Last Updated: 9 August 2020

==== Best Bowling Figure against each opponent ====
Opposition	Player	Figures	Date
Afghanistan	Ben White	4/20	15 March 2024
Australia	Barry McCarthy	3/29	31 October 2022 ‡
Austria	Mark Adair	4/13	23 July 2023
Bahrain	Craig Young	3/16	19 February 2022
Bangladesh	Matthew Humphreys	4/13	27 November 2025
Bermuda	Peter Connell	3/8	3 August 2008
Canada	George Dockrell	3/19	22 March 2012
Denmark	Barry McCarthy	3/16	21 July 2023
England	Josh Little	2/16	26 October 2022 ‡
Germany	Josh Little	2/13	21 February 2022
Hong Kong	Kevin O'Brien	3/32	17 July 2015
India	Peter Chase	4/35	27 June 2018
Italy	Matthew Humphreys	4/16	23 January 2026
Jersey	Barry McCarthy	3/7	24 July 2023
Kenya	George Dockrell	3/15	22 February 2012
Namibia	Simi Singh	3/25	2 November 2019
Nepal	Kevin O'Brien	3/8	13 July 2015
Netherlands	Stuart Thompson	4/18	17 February 2019
New Zealand	Josh Little	4/35	18 July 2022
Nigeria	Craig Young	4/13	26 October 2019
Oman	Simi Singh	3/9	12 February 2022
Pakistan	Barry McCarthy	3/15	16 June 2024 ‡
Papua New Guinea	Max Sorensen	3/17	7 February 2016
Scotland	Jacob Mulder	4/16	20 January 2017
South Africa	Mark Adair	4/31	29 September 2024
Sri Lanka	Alex Cusack	4/18	14 June 2009 ‡
United Arab Emirates	Craig Young	4/28	13 February 2022
United States	Curtis Campher	4/25	23 December 2021
West Indies	Alex Cusack	4/11	21 February 2014
Zimbabwe	Mark Adair	4/23	2 September 2021
Last updated: 8 February 2026.

==== Best career average ====
A bowler's bowling average is the total number of runs they have conceded divided by the number of wickets they have taken.

Rank	Average	Player	Wickets	Runs	Period
1	8.76	Andre Botha	21	184	2008–2010
2	18.11	Max Sorensen	26	471	2012–2016
3	18.36	Matthew Humphreys †	22	404	2023–2026
4	19.51	Mark Adair †	140	2,732	2019–2026
5	19.81	Kevin O'Brien	58	1,149	2008–2021
Qualification: 20 wickets. Last Updated: 8 February 2026

==== Best career economy rate ====
A bowler's economy rate is the total number of runs they have conceded divided by the number of overs they have bowled. New Zealand's Daniel Vettori, holds the T20I record for the best career economy rate with 5.70. Trent Johnston, with a rate of 6.42 runs per over conceded is the highest Irishmen on the list.

Rank	Economy rate	Player	Wickets	Runs	Balls	Period
1	6.42	Trent Johnston	32	636	594	2008–2013
2	6.86	Boyd Rankin	54	1,195	1,044	2009–2020
3	6.97	George Dockrell †	89	1,700	1,975	2010–2026
4	7.06	Alex Cusack	35	714	606	2008–2015
5	7.46	Paul Stirling †	20	546	679	2009–2026
Qualification: 500 balls. Last Updated: 8 February 2026

==== Best career strike rate ====
A bowler's strike rate is the total number of balls they have bowled divided by the number of wickets they have taken. The top bowler with the best T20I career strike rate is Rashid Khan of Afghanistan with strike rate of 12.3 balls per wicket. Kevin O'Brien is the Irish bowler with the lowest strike rate.

Rank	Strike rate	Player	Wickets	Runs	Balls	Period
1	15.1	Mark Adair †	140	2,732	2,115	2019–2026
2	15.8	Kevin O'Brien	58	1,149	917	2008–2021
3	16.4	Craig Young †	87	1,935	1,429	2015–2026
4	17.3	Alex Cusack	37	33	714	2008-2015
5	18.5	Trent Johnston	30	28	636	2008-2013
Qualification: 500 balls. Last Updated: 8 February 2026

==== Most four-wickets (& over) hauls in an innings ====
Rank	Four-wicket hauls	Player	Matches	Balls	Wickets	Period
1	4	Mark Adair †	98	2,732	140	2019–2026
2	3	Alex Cusack	37	606	35	2008–2015
2	3	Craig Young †	71	1,935	87	2015–2026
4	2	Matthew Humphreys †	16	404	22	2023–2026
4	2	Curtis Campher †	68	1,130	32	2021–2026
4	2	Barry McCarthy †	67	2,069	71	2017–2026
4	2	Josh Little †	76	2,122	82	2016–2026
Last Updated: 8 February 2026

==== Best economy rates in an inning ====
The best economy rate in an inning, when a minimum of 12 balls are delivered by the bowler, is Sri Lankan player Nuwan Kulasekara economy of 0.00 during his spell of 0 runs for 1 wicket in 2 overs against Netherlands at Zohur Ahmed Chowdhury Stadium in the 2014 ICC World Twenty20. Alex Cusack holds the Irish record during his spell in 2008 ICC World Twenty20 Qualifier against Kenya at Civil Service Cricket Club Ground, Belfast, Northern Ireland.

Rank	Economy	Player	Overs	Runs	Wickets	Opposition	Venue	Date
1	1.00	Alex Cusack	3	3	2	Kenya	Civil Service Cricket Club Ground, Belfast, Northern Ireland	4 August 2008
2	1.67	Alex Cusack	3	5	2	Kenya	Dubai International Cricket Stadium, Dubai, UAE	14 March 2012
3	1.75	Barry McCarthy	4	7	3	Jersey	Goldenacre Sports Ground, Edinburgh, Scotland	24 July 2023
4	2.00	Andre Botha	2	4	2	Bermuda	Civil Service Cricket Club Ground, Belfast, Northern Ireland	3 August 2008
4	2.00	Kevin O'Brien	4	8	3	Nepal	Civil Service Cricket Club Ground, Belfast, Northern Ireland	13 July 2015
Qualification: 12 balls bowled. Last Updated: 8 February 2026

==== Best strike rates in an inning ====
Rank	Strike rate	Player	Wickets	Runs	Balls	Opposition	Venue	Date
1	2.5	Craig Young	2	2	5	India	Malahide Cricket Club Ground, Dublin, Ireland	18 August 2023
2	3.0	Andy McBrine	2	7	6	Papua New Guinea	Riverway Stadium, Townsville, Australia	7 February 2016
2	3.0	Gareth Delany	2	5	6	Zimbabwe	Harare Sports Club, Harare, Zimbabwe	25 February 2025
4	4.0	Peter Connell	3	8	12	Bermuda	Stormont Cricket Ground, Belfast, Northern Ireland	3 August 2008
4	4.0	Max Sorensen	3	17	12	Papua New Guinea	Riverway Stadium, Townsville, Australia	7 February 2016
4	4.0	George Dockrell	3	7	12	Netherlands	Himachal Pradesh Cricket Association Stadium, Dharamshala, India	13 March 2016 ‡
4	4.0	Mark Adair	3	16	12	Afghanistan	Stormont Cricket Ground, Belfast, Northern Ireland	17 August 2022
Last Updated: 8 February 2026

==== Worst figures in an innings ====
Rank	Figures	Player	Overs	Opposition	Venue	Date
1	0/81	Liam McCarthy	4	West Indies	Bready Cricket Club Ground, Magheramason, Northern Ireland	15 June 2025
2	0/69	Barry McCarthy	4	Afghanistan	Greater Noida Sports Complex Ground, Greater Noida, India	12 March 2017
3	0/59	Barry McCarthy	4	Scotland	Bellerive Oval, Hobart, Australia	19 October 2022 ‡
3	0/59	Mark Adair	4	Australia	The Gabba, Brisbane, Australia	19 October 2022 ‡
5	0/55	Barry McCarthy	4	West Indies	National Cricket Stadium, St. George's, Grenada	15 January 2020
Last Updated: 8 February 2026

==== Most runs conceded in a match ====
Kasun Rajitha also holds the dubious distinction of most runs conceded in a T20I during the aforementioned match. McCarthy in the above-mentioned spell holds the most runs conceded distinction for Ireland.

Rank	Figures	Player	Overs	Opposition	Venue	Date
1	0/81	Liam McCarthy	4	West Indies	Bready Cricket Club Ground, Magheramason, Northern Ireland	15 June 2025
2	0/69	Barry McCarthy	4	Afghanistan	Greater Noida Sports Complex Ground, Greater Noida, India	12 March 2017
3	0/59	Barry McCarthy	4	Scotland	Bellerive Oval, Hobart, Australia	19 October 2022 ‡
3	0/59	Mark Adair	4	Australia	The Gabba, Brisbane, Australia	19 October 2022 ‡
5	1/56	Craig Young	4	Hong Kong	Bready Cricket Club Ground, Magheramason, Northern Ireland	5 September 2016
Last updated: 8 February 2026

==== Most wickets in a calendar year ====
Rank	Wickets	Player	Matches	Year
1	39	Josh Little †	26	2022
2	27	Mark Adair †	17	2019
3	26	Mark Adair †	16	2023
4	25	Mark Adair †	27	2022
4	25	Mark Adair †	14	2024
Last Updated: 8 February 2026

==== Most wickets in a series ====
2019 ICC World Twenty20 Qualifier at UAE saw records set for the most wickets taken by a bowler in a T20I series when Oman's pacer Bilal Khan tool 18 wickets during the series. Mark Adair in the same qualifier took 12 wickets, the most for an Irish bowler in a series.

Rank	Wickets	Player	Matches	Series
1	12	Mark Adair †	5	2023 Men's T20 World Cup Europe regional final
1	12	Mark Adair †	8	2019 ICC Men's T20 World Cup Qualifier
2	11	Kevin O'Brien	4	2015 ICC World Twenty20 Qualifier
2	11	Josh Little †	7	2022 Men's T20 World Cup
4	10	Mark Adair †	3	Zimbabwe in Ireland in 2021
5	9	Barry McCarthy †	5	2023 Men's T20 World Cup Europe regional final
5	9	Ben White †	5	2023 Men's T20 World Cup Europe regional final
5	9	Gareth Delany †	8	2019 ICC Men's T20 World Cup Qualifier
Last Updated: 8 February 2026

=== Wicket-keeping records ===
The wicket-keeper is a specialist fielder who stands behind the stumps being guarded by the batsman on strike and is the only member of the fielding side allowed to wear gloves and leg pads.

==== Most career dismissals ====
A wicket-keeper can be credited with the dismissal of a batsman in two ways, caught or stumped. A fair catch is taken when the ball is caught fully within the field of play without it bouncing after the ball has touched the striker's bat or glove holding the bat, Laws 5.6.2.2 and 5.6.2.3 state that the hand or the glove holding the bat shall be regarded as the ball striking or touching the bat while a stumping occurs when the wicket-keeper puts down the wicket while the batsman is out of his ground and not attempting a run. MS Dhoni heads the all-time list of taking most dismissals in T20Is as a designated wicket-keeper. Gary Wilson is the leading Irish wicket-keeper on this list.

Rank	Dismissals	Player	Matches	Innings	Period
1	36	Gary Wilson	81	51	2009-2020
2	25	Niall O'Brien	30	22	2008-2016
3	10	Stuart Poynter	25	13	2015-2019
4	7	Lorcan Tucker †	20	8	2016-2021
5	6	Neil Rock †	5	5	2021-2021
Last updated:4 September 2021

==== Most career catches ====
Quinton de Kock heads the all-time list for most catches taken by the designated wicketkeeper. Gary Wilson is the leading Irish wicket-keeper on this list.

Rank	Catches	Player	Matches	Innings	Period
1	29	Gary Wilson	81	51	2009-2020
2	25	Lorcan Tucker †	44	30	2016-2022
3	15	Niall O'Brien	30	22	2008-2016
4	10	Neil Rock †	13	13	2021-2021
5	8	Stuart Poynter	25	13	2015-2019
Last Updated: 19 October 2022

==== Most career stumpings ====
Dhoni also holds the record for most stumpings by a wicket-keeper. Niall O'Brien is the leading Irish wicket-keeper on this list

Rank	Stumpings	Player	Matches	Innings	Period
1	10	Niall O'Brien	30	22	2008-2016
2	7	Gary Wilson	81	51	2009-2020
3	2	Stuart Poynter	25	13	2015-2019
3	2	Rory McCann	3	3	2012-2012
5	1	Lorcan Tucker †	20	8	2016-2021
5	1	Neil Rock †	5	5	2021-2021
Last Updated: 4 September 2021

==== Most dismissals in an innings ====
Four wicket-keepers on four occasions have taken five dismissals in a single innings in a T20I.

The feat of taking 4 dismissals in an innings has been achieved by 19 wicket-keepers on 26 occasions with both Wilson and Niall O'Brien achieving it once each.

Rank	Dismissals	Player	Opposition	Venue	Date
1	4	Niall O'Brien	Sri Lanka	Lord's, London, England	14 June 2009
1	4	Gary Wilson	Kenya	Dubai International Cricket Stadium, Dubai, UAE	14 March 2012
3	3	Gary Wilson	Nepal	Civil Service Cricket Club Ground, Belfast, Northern Ireland	13 July 2015
3	3	Gary Wilson	Afghanistan	Bready Cricket Club Ground, Magheramason, Northern Ireland	20 August 2018
3	3	Lorcan Tucker	South Africa	Malahide Cricket Club Ground, Dublin, Ireland	19 July 2021
Last Updated: 22 July 2021

==== Most dismissals in a series ====
Netherlands wicket-keeper Scott Edwards holds the T20Is record for the most dismissals taken by a wicket-keeper in a series. He made 13 dismissals during the 2019 ICC World Twenty20 Qualifier. Gary Wilson in the same series affected eight dismissals, which is the most for an Irish wicket-keeper in a series.

Rank	Dismissals	Player	Matches	Innings	Series
1	8	Gary Wilson	8	8	2019 ICC Men's T20 World Cup Qualifier
2	7	Gary Wilson	5	5	2012 ICC World Twenty20 Qualifier
3	6	Niall O'Brien	4	4	2009 ICC World Twenty20
3	6	Neil Rock †	5	5	Zimbabwe in Ireland in 2021
5	5	Gary Wilson	4	4	2015 ICC World Twenty20 Qualifier
5	5	Stuart Poynter	3	3	2018–19 Oman Quadrangular Series
5	5	Lorcan Tucker †	3	3	South Africa in Ireland in 2021
Last Updated: 4 September 2021

=== Fielding records ===
==== Most career catches ====
Caught is one of the nine methods a batsman can be dismissed in cricket. (Note: In 2017, The Laws of Cricket were amended, reducing the methods of dismissals from ten to nine, with handled the ball now covered as part of obstructing the field.) The majority of catches are caught in the slips, located behind the batsman, next to the wicket-keeper, on the off side of the field. Most slip fielders are top order batsmen.

South Africa's David Miller holds the record for the most catches in T20Is by a non-wicket-keeper with 75, followed by New Zealand's Martin Guptill with 68. George Dockrell is the leading catcher for Ireland.

Rank	Catches	Player	Matches	Period
1	52	George Dockrell †	107	2010-2022
2	40	Kevin O'Brien	110	2008-2021
3	30	Andrew Balbirnie †	81	2015-2022
4	28	Paul Stirling †	116	2009-2022
5	25	Harry Tector †	46	2019-2022
Last Updated: 19 October 2022

==== Most catches in an innings ====
The feat of taking 4 catches in an innings has been achieved by 14 fielders on 14 occasions. No Irishmen fielder has achieved this feat. The most is three catches on nine occasions.

Rank	Dismissals	Player	Opposition	Venue	Date
1	3	Trent Johnston	Kenya	Mombasa Sports Club Ground, Mombasa, Kenya	22 February 2012
1	3	Paul Stirling †	Afghanistan	Sheikh Zayed Cricket Stadium, Abu Dhabi, UAE	30 November 2013
1	3	George Dockrell †	Scotland	Dubai International Cricket Stadium, Dubai, UAE	20 January 2017
1	3	George Dockrell †	Afghanistan	Greater Noida Sports Complex Ground, Greater Noida, India	12 March 2017
1	3	Stuart Thompson	India	Malahide Cricket Club Ground, Dublin, Ireland	27 June 2018
1	3	George Dockrell †	West Indies	National Cricket Stadium, St. George's, Grenada	15 January 2020
Last Updated: 9 August 2020

==== Most catches in a series ====
The 2019 ICC Men's T20 World Cup Qualifier, which saw Netherlands retain their title, saw the record set for the most catches taken by a non-wicket-keeper in a T20I series. Jersey's Ben Stevens and Namibia's JJ Smit took 10 catches in the series. Kevin O'Brien in the same series took 8 catches, which is the most for an Irish fielder in a series.

Rank	Catches	Player	Matches	Innings	Series
1	6	Kevin O'Brien †	8	8	2019 ICC Men's T20 World Cup Qualifier
2	5	George Dockrell †	4	4	2017 Desert T20 Challenge
2	5	George Dockrell †	3	3	Ireland v Afghanistan in India in 2019
2	5	Harry Tector †	4	4	2018–19 Oman Quadrangular Series
4	4	Five Irish fielders on six occasions have taken four catches in a series			
Last Updated: 4 September 2021

=== Other records ===
==== Most career matches ====
India's Rohit Sharma holds the record for the most T20I matches played with 142. Paul Stirling is the most experienced Irish player, and is one of three players to have represented Ireland in more than 100 T20Is.

Rank	Matches	Player	Period
1	116	Paul Stirling †	2009-2022
2	110	Kevin O'Brien	2008-2021
3	107	George Dockrell †	2010-2022
4	81	Andrew Balbirnie †	2015-2022
4	81	Gary Wilson	2008-2021
Last Updated: 19 October 2022

==== Most consecutive career matches ====
Scotland's Richie Berrington holds the record for the most consecutive T20I matches played with 74. Kevin O'Brien holds the Irishmen record.

Rank	Matches	Player	Period
1	62	Kevin O'Brien	2016-2021
2	56*	Paul Stirling†	2019-2022
3	49*	Andrew Balbirnie†	2019-2022
4	46	Kevin O'Brien	2008-2016
5	37	William Porterfield	2008-2014
Last updated: 19 October 2022

==== Most matches as captain ====
MS Dhoni, who led the Indian cricket team from 2007 to 2016, holds the record for the most matches played as captain in T20Is with 72. William Porterfield holds the Irish record.

Rank	Matches	Player	Won	Lost	Tied	NR	Win%	Period
1	56	William Porterfield	26	26	0	4	50.00	2008–2017
2	52	Andrew Balbirnie	19	31	1	1	38.23	2020–2023
3	26	Gary Wilson	12	13	1	0	48.08	2016–2019
4	14	Paul Stirling†	7	7	0	0	50.00	2019–2023
5	4	Kevin O'Brien	0	2	0	2	0.00	2015–2015
Last Updated: 18 August 2023

==== Youngest players on Debut ====
The youngest player to play in a T20I match is Marian Gherasim at the age of 14 years and 16 days. Making his debut for Romania against the Bulgaria on 16 October 2020 in the first T20I of the 2020 Balkan Cup thus becoming the youngest to play in a men's T20I match.

Rank	Age	Player	Opposition	Venue	Date
1	16 years and 309 days	Josh Little	Hong Kong	Bready Cricket Club Ground, Magheramason, Northern Ireland	5 September 2016
2	17 years and 194 days	George Dockrell	Afghanistan	Paikiasothy Saravanamuttu Stadium, Colombo, Sri Lanka	1 February 2010
3	18 years and 285 days	Paul Stirling	Pakistan	The Oval, London, England	15 June 2009
4	19 years and 285 days	Harry Tector	Scotland	Malahide Cricket Club Ground, Dublin, Ireland	17 September 2019
5	19 years and 361 days	Lorcan Tucker	Hong Kong	Bready Cricket Club Ground, Magheramason, Northern Ireland	5 September 2016
Last Updated: 9 August 2020

==== Oldest Players on Debut ====
The Turkish batsmen Osman Göker is the oldest player to make their debut a T20I match. Playing in the 2019 Continental Cup against Romania at Moara Vlasiei Cricket Ground, Moara Vlăsiei he was aged 59 years and 181 days.

Rank	Age	Player	Opposition	Venue	Date
1	35 years and 190 days	Jeremy Bray	Bangladesh	Trent Bridge, Nottingham, England	8 June 2009 ‡
2	29 years and 95 days	Trent Johnston	Scotland	Civil Service Cricket Club, Belfast, Northern Ireland	2 August 2008
3	32 years and 341 days	Kyle McCallan	Scotland	Civil Service Cricket Club, Belfast, Northern Ireland	2 August 2008
4	32 years and 325 days	Andre Botha	Scotland	Civil Service Cricket Club, Belfast, Northern Ireland	2 August 2008
5	32 years and 255 days	John Anderson	Scotland	Bready Cricket Club Ground, Magheramason, Northern Ireland	18 June 2015
Last Updated: 28 March 2021

==== Oldest Players ====
The Turkish batsmen Osman Göker is the oldest player to appear in a T20I match during the same above mentioned match.

Rank	Age	Player	Opposition	Venue	Date
1	39 years and 215 days	Trent Johnston	Afghanistan	Sheikh Zayed Cricket Stadium, Abu Dhabi, UAE	30 November 2013
2	37 years and 184 days	Kevin O'Brien	Zimbabwe	Bready Cricket Club Ground, Magheramason, Northern Ireland	4 September 2021
3	35 years and 247 days	Boyd Rankin	Afghanistan	Greater Noida Sports Complex Ground, Greater Noida, India	8 March 2020
4	35 years and 192 days	Jeremy Bray	India	Trent Bridge, Nottingham, England	10 June 2009 ‡
5	35 years and 180 days	Ed Joyce	Netherlands	Sylhet International Cricket Stadium, Sylhet, Bangladesh	21 March 2014 ‡
Last Updated: 4 September 2021

== Partnership records ==
In cricket, two batsmen are always present at the crease batting together in a partnership. This partnership will continue until one of them is dismissed, retires or the innings comes to a close.

=== Highest partnerships by wicket ===
A wicket partnership describes the number of runs scored before each wicket falls. The first wicket partnership is between the opening batsmen and continues until the first wicket falls. The second wicket partnership then commences between the not out batsman and the number three batsman. This partnership continues until the second wicket falls. The third wicket partnership then commences between the not out batsman and the new batsman. This continues down to the tenth wicket partnership. When the tenth wicket has fallen, there is no batsman left to partner so the innings is closed.

Wicket	Runs	First batsman	Second batsman	Opposition	Venue	Date
1st Wicket	154	Kevin O'Brien	Paul Stirling	West Indies	National Cricket Stadium, St. George's, Grenada	15 January 2020
2nd Wicket	96	Kevin O'Brien	Andrew Balbirnie	Afghanistan	Rajiv Gandhi International Cricket Stadium, Dehradun, India	24 February 2019
3rd Wicket	80	Gareth Delany	Harry Tector	Oman	Al Amerat Cricket Ground, Al Amerat, Oman	22 February 2022
4th Wicket	101	Andrew Poynter	Kevin O'Brien	Netherlands	Sylhet International Cricket Stadium, Sylhet, Bangladesh	21 March 2014
5th Wicket	119*	Curtis Campher	George Dockrell	Scotland	Bellerive Oval, Hobart, Australia	19 October 2022‡
6th Wicket	86	Lorcan Tucker	George Dockrell	South Africa	Bristol County Ground, Bristol, England	3 August 2022
7th Wicket	67*	George Dockrell	Stuart Poynter	Afghanistan	Rajiv Gandhi International Cricket Stadium, Dehradun, India	21 February 2019
8th Wicket	74	George Dockrell	Fionn Hand	Afghanistan	Civil Service Cricket Club Ground, Belfast, Northern Ireland	12 August 2022
9th Wicket	47*	Gary Wilson	Max Sorensen	Bangladesh	Civil Service Cricket Club Ground, Belfast, Northern Ireland	18 July 2012
10th Wicket	44*	Barry McCarthy	Josh Little	South Africa	Malahide Cricket Club Ground, Dublin, Ireland	19 July 2021
Last Updated: 19 July 2021

=== Highest partnerships by runs ===
The highest T20I partnership by runs for any wicket is held by the Afghan pairing of Hazratullah Zazai and Usman Ghani who put together an opening wicket partnership of 236 runs during the Ireland v Afghanistan series in India in 2019

Wicket	Runs	First batsman	Second batsman	Opposition	Venue	Date
1st Wicket	154	Kevin O'Brien	Paul Stirling†	West Indies	National Cricket Stadium, St. George's, Grenada	15 January 2020
1st Wicket	126	Kevin O'Brien	Paul Stirling†	Afghanistan	Rajiv Gandhi International Cricket Stadium, Dehradun, India	23 February 2019
5th Wicket	119*	Curtis Campher†	George Dockrell†	Scotland	Bellerive Oval, Hobart, Australia	19 October 2022
1st Wicket	115	Kevin O'Brien	Paul Stirling†	Scotland	Al Amerat Cricket Stadium, Muscat, Oman	15 February 2019
1st Wicket	109*	William Porterfield	Paul Stirling†	Canada	Dubai International Cricket Stadium, Dubai, UAE	22 March 2012
Last Updated: 19 October 2022

=== Highest overall partnership runs by a pair ===
Rank	Runs	Innings	Players	Highest	Average	100/50	T20I career span
1	1,811	63	Andrew Balbirnie & Paul Stirling †	103	29.20	1/15	2015–2023
2	1,720	49	Kevin O'Brien & Paul Stirling	154	35.10	3/10	2010–2021
3	1,065	40	William Porterfield & Paul Stirling	109*	28.78	1/6	2009–2018
4	477	27	Kevin O'Brien & Gary Wilson	53	17.66	0/3	2009–2019
5	439	15	William Porterfield & Niall O'Brien	59	31.35	0/4	2008–2016
An asterisk (*) signifies an unbroken partnership (i.e. neither of the batsmen was dismissed before either the end of the allotted overs or the required score being reached). Last updated: 18 August 2023

== Umpiring records ==
=== Most matches umpired ===
An umpire in cricket is a person who officiates the match according to the Laws of Cricket. Two umpires adjudicate the match on the field, whilst a third umpire has access to video replays, and a fourth umpire looks after the match balls and other duties. The records below are only for on-field umpires.

Ahsan Raza of Pakistan holds the record for the most T20I matches umpired with 49. The most experienced Irishmen umpire is Alan Neill with 15 matches officiated so far.

Rank	Matches	Umpire	Period
1	20	Alan Neill †	2016-2021
2	18	Roland Black †	2016-2021
3	17	Mark Hawthorne †	2012-2021
4	6	Richard Smith	2012-2012
4	6	Mary Waldron †	2019-2019
Last Updated: 4 September 2021

== See also ==
- List of Twenty20 International cricket records
- List of Twenty20 International cricket hat-tricks
- List of Test cricket records
- List of One Day International cricket records
- List of Ireland Test cricket records
- List of Ireland One Day International cricket records
