= Irish cricket team in the United States in 2021–22 =

International cricket tour

	United States	Ireland
- Dates: 22 – 30 December 2021
Captains	Monank Patel	Andrew Balbirnie

One Day International series

Twenty20 International series
- Results: 2-match series drawn 1–1
Most runs	Gajanand Singh (87)	Lorcan Tucker (141)
Most wickets	Saurabh Netravalkar (5)	Barry McCarthy (4); Curtis Campher (4)

The Ireland cricket team visited the United States in December 2021 to play three One Day International (ODI) and two Twenty20 Internationals (T20I) matches at Central Broward Park in Florida. It was the first time the United States was to host a full series with a Test nation, and the first time since 1973 that the Ireland cricket team have visited the US. Following the matches in the United States, the Ireland team then toured the West Indies for a three-match ODI series.

The United States recovered from 16/4 in the first T20I to reach 188/6. Ireland were unable to chase down the target, resulting in a 26-run win for the Americans. The visitors levelled the series with a 9-run win in the second T20I, with Lorcan Tucker scoring his second half-century of the series.

A practice match, scheduled to be played on 20 December 2021, was cancelled due to COVID-19 issues within the squads. The first ODI was cancelled after a match official tested positive for COVID-19 and other officials were deemed close contacts. On 28 December 2021, the remaining ODI matches were each moved back by one day after a number of positive COVID-19 tests in the traveling parties, before the series was ultimately cancelled. The curtailment of the series resulted in financial losses for USA Cricket, contributing to its year-end debt load.

== Squads ==
ODIs		T20Is	
United States	Ireland	United States	Ireland
Monank Patel (c); Aaron Jones (vc); Rahul Jariwala; Nosthush Kenjige; Ali Khan; Marty Kain; Jaskaran Malhotra; Xavier Marshall; Sushant Modani; Saurabh Netravalkar; Nisarg Patel; Gajanand Singh; Jasdeep Singh; Steven Taylor; Vatsal Vaghela	Andrew Balbirnie (c); Mark Adair; Curtis Campher; George Dockrell; Josh Little; Andy McBrine; Barry McCarthy; William Porterfield; Neil Rock; Simi Singh; Paul Stirling; Harry Tector; Lorcan Tucker; Ben White; Craig Young	Monank Patel (c); ~~Aaron Jones (vc)~~; ~~Karima Gore~~; Ritwik Behera; Ali Khan; Marty Kain; ~~Jaskaran Malhotra~~; Xavier Marshall; Sushant Modani; Yasir Mohammad; Saurabh Netravalkar; Nisarg Patel; Ryan Scott; Ali Sheikh; Gajanand Singh; Jasdeep Singh; Steven Taylor; ~~Rusty Theron~~; Vatsal Vaghela	Andrew Balbirnie (c); Mark Adair; Curtis Campher; Gareth Delany; George Dockrell; Shane Getkate; Josh Little; Barry McCarthy; William McClintock; Neil Rock; Simi Singh; Paul Stirling; Lorcan Tucker; Ben White; ~~Craig Young~~

Josh Little was initially left out of Ireland's T20I squad due to his participation in the 2021 Lanka Premier League. However, on 17 December 2021, he was recalled to the team. Ahead of Ireland's departure to the United States, Craig Young was identified as close contact of someone with a positive COVID-19 case. Therefore, per Northern Irish travel guidance, Young was unable to travel for ten days, ruling him out of the T20I matches. Kyle Phillip was named as a reserve player for the United States.

Ahead of the series, the United States made several changes to their squad. Karima Gore, Jaskaran Malhotra and Aaron Jones were all ruled out of the T20I matches due to COVID-19, while Rusty Theron was ruled out due to a groin injury. They were replaced by Ritwik Behera, Yasir Mohammad, Ali Sheikh, and Ryan Scott in their T20I squad, and Kyle Phillip withdrew due to work commitments. Marty Kain was added to the ODI squad, and Sushant Modani was added to the T20I squad.

== T20I series ==
=== 1st T20I ===
22 December 2021
14:00
Scorecard

United States; 188/6 (20 overs)	v	Ireland; 162/6 (20 overs)
Gajanand Singh 65 (42); Barry McCarthy 4/30 (4 overs)		Lorcan Tucker 57* (49); Saurabh Netravalkar 2/26 (4 overs)

United States won by 26 runs
Central Broward Park, Lauderhill
Umpires: Sameer Bandekar (USA) and Vijaya Mallela (USA)
Player of the match: Gajanand Singh (USA)

- United States won the toss and elected to bat.
- Ritwik Behera, Marty Kain, Sushant Modani, Yasir Mohammad and Ryan Scott (USA) all made their T20I debuts.

=== 2nd T20I ===
23 December 2021
19:00 (N)
Scorecard

Ireland; 150 (18.5 overs)	v	United States; 141/7 (20 overs)
Lorcan Tucker 84 (56); Saurabh Netravalkar 3/33 (3.5 overs)		Sushant Modani 27 (16); Curtis Campher 4/25 (4 overs)

Ireland won by 9 runs
Central Broward Park, Lauderhill
Umpires: Jermaine Lindo (USA) and Vijaya Mallela (USA)
Player of the match: Lorcan Tucker (Ire)

- United States won the toss and elected to field.
- Vatsal Vaghela (USA) made his T20I debut.

== ODI series ==
=== 1st ODI ===
26 December 2021
10:00
Scorecard

United States	v	Ireland

Central Broward Park, Lauderhill
Umpires: Jermaine Lindo (USA) and Joel Wilson (WI)

=== 2nd ODI ===
29 December 2021
10:00
Scorecard

United States	v	Ireland

Central Broward Park, Lauderhill
Umpires: Sameer Bandekar (USA) and Joel Wilson (WI)

=== 3rd ODI ===
30 December 2021
14:30 (D/N)
Scorecard

United States	v	Ireland

Central Broward Park, Lauderhill
Umpires: Vijaya Mallela (USA) and Joel Wilson (WI)
