= Irish cricket team in Zimbabwe in 2023–24 =

International cricket tour

	Zimbabwe	Ireland
- Dates: 7 – 17 December 2023
Captains	Sikandar Raza (Note: Sean Williams & Ryan Burl captained Zimbabwe in the 2nd & 3rd T20Is respectively.)	Paul Stirling

One Day International series
- Results: Ireland won the 3-match series 2–0
Most runs	Joylord Gumbie (105)	Curtis Campher (106)
Most wickets	Brandon Mavuta (3)	Josh Little (7)
- Player of the series: Curtis Campher (Ire)

Twenty20 International series
- Results: Ireland won the 3-match series 2–1
Most runs	Clive Madande (91)	Harry Tector (126)
Most wickets	Richard Ngarava (5)	Craig Young (5)
- Player of the series: Harry Tector (Ire)

The Ireland cricket team toured Zimbabwe in December 2023 to play three One Day International (ODI) and three Twenty20 International (T20I) matches. The T20I series formed part of Ireland's preparation for the 2024 ICC Men's T20 World Cup tournament.

The first T20I was the first international match to be played under flood lights in Zimbabwe. Ireland won the T20I series 2–1 to seal their first away T20I series win against a Full Member team.

Ireland won the ODI series by 2–0, after first match was washed out by rain. It was Ireland's first men's ODI series victory in Zimbabwe.

== Squads ==
ODIs		T20Is	
Zimbabwe	Ireland	Zimbabwe	Ireland
Sikandar Raza (c); Faraz Akram; Ryan Burl; Tanaka Chivanga; Joylord Gumbie; Luke Jongwe; Innocent Kaia; Takudzwanashe Kaitano; Tinashe Kamunhukamwe; Clive Madande; Wellington Masakadza; Brandon Mavuta; Tony Munyonga; Blessing Muzarabani; Richard Ngarava; Milton Shumba	Paul Stirling (c); Mark Adair; Andrew Balbirnie; Curtis Campher; George Dockrell; Josh Little; Graham Hume; Andy McBrine; Barry McCarthy; Neil Rock (wk); Harry Tector; Lorcan Tucker (wk); Theo van Woerkom; Craig Young	Sikandar Raza (c); Brian Bennett; Ryan Burl; ~~Craig Ervine~~; Trevor Gwandu; Luke Jongwe; Tinashe Kamunhukamwe; Clive Madande (wk); Wesley Madhevere; Tadiwanashe Marumani; Wellington Masakadza; Brandon Mavuta; Carl Mumba; Tony Munyonga; Blessing Muzarabani; Richard Ngarava; Sean Williams	Paul Stirling (c); Mark Adair; Ross Adair; Andrew Balbirnie; Curtis Campher; Gareth Delany; George Dockrell; Josh Little; Graham Hume; Barry McCarthy; Neil Rock (wk); Harry Tector; Lorcan Tucker (wk); Theo van Woerkom; Craig Young

- Injured Craig Ervine was ruled out of T20I series, with Tinashe Kamunhukamwe replaced him in Zimbabwe's squad.
- Sean Williams captained Zimbabwe for the second T20I, after Sikandar Raza was banned for breaching the ICC Code of Conduct.
- Ryan Burl captained Zimbabwe for the third T20I, after Sean Williams was ruled injured for the third T20I.

== T20I series ==
=== 1st T20I ===
7 December 2023
18:30 (N)
Scorecard

Ireland; 147/8 (20 overs)	v	Zimbabwe; 148/9 (20 overs)
Andrew Balbirnie 32 (25); Sikandar Raza 3/28 (4 overs)		Sikander Raza 65 (42); Josh Little 2/17 (4 overs)

Zimbabwe won by 1 wicket
Harare Sports Club, Harare
Umpires: Iknow Chabi (Zim) and Forster Mutizwa (Zim)
Player of the match: Sikandar Raza (Zim)

- Zimbabwe won the toss and elected to field.
- Brian Bennett and Trevor Gwandu (Zim) both made their T20I debuts.
- Mark Adair became the first male cricketer from Ireland to take 100 wickets in T20Is.

=== 2nd T20I ===
9 December 2023
13:00
Scorecard

Zimbabwe; 165/5 (20 overs)	v	Ireland; 166/6 (19.4 overs)
Clive Madande 44* (39); Mark Adair 2/28 (4 overs)		Harry Tector 48 (38); Richard Ngarava 2/33 (4 overs)

Ireland won by 4 wickets
Harare Sports Club, Harare
Umpires: Iknow Chabi (Zim) and Langton Rusere (Zim)
Player of the match: Harry Tector (Ire)

- Ireland won the toss and elected to field.
- Theo van Woerkom (Ire) made his T20I debut.

=== 3rd T20I ===
10 December 2023
13:00
Scorecard

Zimbabwe; 140/6 (20 overs)	v	Ireland; 141/4 (18.4 overs)
Ryan Burl 36 (28); Gareth Delany 2/8 (2 overs)		Harry Tector 54* (45); Blessing Muzarabani 1/21 (4 overs)

Ireland won by 6 wickets
Harare Sports Club, Harare
Umpires: Christopher Phiri (Zim) and Langton Rusere (Zim)
Player of the match: George Dockrell (Ire)

- Ireland won the toss and elected to field.

== ODI series ==
=== 1st ODI ===
13 December 2023
09:15
Scorecard

Zimbabwe; 121/6 (25.3 overs)	v	Ireland
Tinashe Kamunhukamwe 28 (15); Graham Hume 2/7 (4.3 overs)

No result
Harare Sports Club, Harare
Umpires: Iknow Chabi (Zim) and Adrian Holdstock (SA)

- Ireland won the toss and elected to field.
- Rain during Zimbabwe's innings prevented any further play.

=== 2nd ODI ===
15 December 2023
09:15
Scorecard

Zimbabwe; 166 (42.5 overs)	v	Ireland; 170/6 (40.1 overs)
Wellington Masakadza 40 (47); Josh Little 6/36 (10 overs)		Curtis Campher 66 (71); Blessing Muzarabani 2/23 (10 overs)

Ireland won by 4 wickets
Harare Sports Club, Harare
Umpires: Adrian Holdstock (SA) and Forster Mutizwa (Zim)
Player of the match: Josh Little (Ire)

- Zimbabwe won the toss and elected to bat.
- Josh Little recorded best bowling figure for Ireland in ODIs (6/36).
- Tony Munyonga replaced Ryan Burl as concussion substitute for Zimbabwe.

=== 3rd ODI ===
17 December 2023
09:15
Scorecard

Zimbabwe; 197 (40 overs)	v	Ireland; 204/3 (37.5 overs)
Joylord Gumbie 72 (106); Graham Hume 4/34 (8 overs)		Andrew Balbirnie 82* (102); Brandon Mavuta 1/19 (5 overs)

Ireland won by 7 wickets (DLS method)
Harare Sports Club, Harare
Umpires: Adrian Holdstock (SA) and Langton Rusere (Zim)
Player of the match: Andrew Balbirnie (Ire)

- Ireland won the toss and elected to field.
- The match was reduced to 40 overs per side due to rain.
- Ireland were set a revised target of 201 runs from 40 overs due to rain.
- Andrew Balbirnie (Ire) scored his 3,000th run in ODIs.
