= Zimbabwean cricket team in Ireland in 2021 =

International cricket tour

	Ireland	Zimbabwe
- Dates: 27 August – 13 September 2021
Captains	Andrew Balbirnie	Craig Ervine

One Day International series
- Results: 3-match series drawn 1–1
Most runs	William Porterfield (158)	Craig Ervine (121)
Most wickets	Andy McBrine (4); Josh Little (4)	Blessing Muzarabani (6)
- Player of the series: William Porterfield (Ire)

Twenty20 International series
- Results: Ireland won the 5-match series 3–2
Most runs	Paul Stirling (234)	Craig Ervine (160)
Most wickets	Mark Adair (10)	Luke Jongwe (7)
- Player of the series: Paul Stirling (Ire)

The Zimbabwe cricket team toured Ireland in August and September 2021 to play three One Day International (ODI) and five Twenty20 International (T20I) matches. The ODI series formed part of the inaugural 2020–2023 ICC Cricket World Cup Super League. Cricket Ireland confirmed the fixtures in February 2021. Originally, three T20I matches were scheduled to be played, but two more T20I matches were added in April 2021, after planned matches against Pakistan were cancelled.

However, on 22 July 2021, Cricket Ireland announced that the series would need to be rescheduled due to quarantine requirements needed for the visiting team. The aim was to reschedule the matches for August-September 2021. Zimbabwe Cricket requested government clearance to travel to Ireland, with 19 August 2021 proposed as the date to depart for the tour. On 5 August 2021, Cricket Ireland confirmed the new itinerary for the tour, with the series starting on 27 August 2021.

Zimbabwe won the first T20I match by three runs. However, Ireland went on to win the next three matches, winning the series with a match to spare. Zimbabwe won the fifth T20I match by five runs, with Ireland winning the series 3–2.

Zimbabwe won the first ODI by 38 runs. In the second ODI, Ireland scored 282/8 before the match was washed out, ending in a no result. The day before the third ODI of the series, Zimbabwe's Brendan Taylor announced that he would retire from international cricket following the match. Ireland went on to win the match by seven wickets, with the series drawn 1–1.

== Squads ==
Ireland		Zimbabwe
ODIs	T20Is	ODIs and T20Is
Andrew Balbirnie (c); Mark Adair; ~~Curtis Campher~~; George Dockrell; Shane Getkate; Graham Kennedy; Josh Little; Andy McBrine; Barry McCarthy; William Porterfield; Neil Rock; Simi Singh; Paul Stirling; Harry Tector; Lorcan Tucker; Craig Young	Andrew Balbirnie (c); Mark Adair; Curtis Campher; George Dockrell; Shane Getkate; Josh Little; Barry McCarthy; William McClintock; Kevin O'Brien; Neil Rock; Simi Singh; Paul Stirling; Harry Tector; Lorcan Tucker; Ben White; Craig Young	Craig Ervine (c); Ryan Burl; Regis Chakabva; Tendai Chatara; Luke Jongwe; Tinashe Kamunhukamwe; Wesley Madhevere; Tadiwanashe Marumani; Wellington Masakadza; Tarisai Musakanda; Blessing Muzarabani; Dion Myers; Richard Ngarava; Sikandar Raza; Milton Shumba; Brendan Taylor; Donald Tiripano; Sean Williams

Zimbabwe did not name individual squads for the ODI and T20I matches, opting instead to name a combined squad of 18 players for the tour. Curtis Campher was ruled out of Ireland's ODI squad after suffering an injury in the first T20I match. Shane Getkate was named as Campher's replacement for Ireland's ODI matches.

== Tour match ==
6 September 2021
10:30
Scorecard

Zimbabwe; 171/9 (40 overs)	v	Ireland Wolves; 166/7 (40 overs)
Sean Williams 39 (48); Matt Ford 2/28 (8 overs)		Murray Commins 56 (88); Sikandar Raza 3/36 (8 overs)

Zimbabwe won by 5 runs
Circular Road, Belmont
Umpires: Roland Black (Ire) and Paul Reynolds (Ire)
Player of the match: Sikandar Raza (Zim)

- Zimbabwe won the toss and elected to bat.
- The match was reduced to 40 overs per side due to a wet outfield.

== T20I series ==
=== 1st T20I ===
27 August 2021
12:00
Scorecard

Zimbabwe; 117/7 (20 overs)	v	Ireland; 114/9 (20 overs)
Regis Chakabva 47 (28); Craig Young 2/15 (4 overs)		Simi Singh 28* (22); Ryan Burl 3/22 (4 overs)

Zimbabwe won by 3 runs
Castle Avenue, Dublin
Umpires: Roland Black (Ire) and Paul Reynolds (Ire)
Player of the match: Regis Chakabva (Zim)

- Ireland won the toss and elected to field.
- Curtis Campher and Neil Rock (Ire) both made their T20I debuts.
- Craig Ervine captained Zimbabwe for the first time in T20Is.
- Paul Stirling played in his 300th match for Ireland.

=== 2nd T20I ===
29 August 2021
12:00
Scorecard

Zimbabwe; 152/5 (20 overs)	v	Ireland; 153/3 (18.3 overs)
Milton Shumba 46* (27); Shane Getkate 3/20 (4 overs)		Kevin O'Brien 60 (41); Ryan Burl 2/24 (4 overs)

Ireland won by 7 wickets
Castle Avenue, Dublin
Umpires: Mark Hawthorne (Ire) and Alan Neill (Ire)
Player of the match: Kevin O'Brien (Ire)

- Zimbabwe won the toss and elected to bat.

=== 3rd T20I ===
1 September 2021
15:00
Scorecard

Ireland; 178/2 (20 overs)	v	Zimbabwe; 138 (18.2 overs)
Paul Stirling 115* (75); Ryan Burl 1/30 (4 overs)		Craig Ervine 33 (18); Mark Adair 3/11 (3 overs)

Ireland won by 40 runs
Bready Cricket Club Ground, Magheramason
Umpires: Roland Black (Ire) and Alan Neill (Ire)
Player of the match: Paul Stirling (Ire)

- Zimbabwe won the toss and elected to field.
- William McClintock (Ire) made his T20I debut.
- Paul Stirling (Ire) scored his first century in T20Is.

=== 4th T20I ===
2 September 2021
15:00
Scorecard

Ireland; 174/4 (20 overs)	v	Zimbabwe; 110/9 (20 overs)
Kevin O'Brien 47 (39); Wellington Masakadza 2/22 (4 overs)		Craig Ervine 28 (30); Mark Adair 4/23 (4 overs)

Ireland won by 64 runs
Bready Cricket Club Ground, Magheramason
Umpires: Mark Hawthorne (Ire) and Paul Reynolds (Ire)
Player of the match: Mark Adair (Ire)

- Zimbabwe won the toss and elected to field.

=== 5th T20I ===
4 September 2021
15:00
Scorecard

Zimbabwe; 124/4 (20 overs)	v	Ireland; 119 (20 overs)
Craig Ervine 67* (57); Mark Adair 3/23 (4 overs)		Neil Rock 22 (21); Luke Jongwe 3/29 (4 overs)

Zimbabwe won by 5 runs
Bready Cricket Club Ground, Magheramason
Umpires: Roland Black (Ire) and Alan Neill (Ire)
Player of the match: Craig Ervine (Zim)

- Zimbabwe won the toss and elected to bat.

== ODI series ==
=== 1st ODI ===
8 September 2021
10:30
Scorecard

Zimbabwe; 266/7 (50 overs)	v	Ireland; 228 (48.4 overs)
Craig Ervine 64 (96); Simi Singh 1/22 (10 overs)		William Porterfield 75 (110); Blessing Muzarabani 4/29 (9.4 overs)

Zimbabwe won by 38 runs
Stormont Cricket Ground, Belfast
Umpires: Mark Hawthorne (Ire) and Paul Reynolds (Ire)
Player of the match: Sikandar Raza (Zim)

- Ireland won the toss and elected to field.
- World Cup Super League points: Zimbabwe 10, Ireland 0.

=== 2nd ODI ===
10 September 2021
10:30
Scorecard

Ireland; 282/8 (50 overs)	v	Zimbabwe
William Porterfield 67 (100); Richard Ngarava 3/52 (9 overs)

No result
Stormont Cricket Ground, Belfast
Umpires: Roland Black (Ire) and Mark Hawthorne (Ire)

- Zimbabwe won the toss and elected to field.
- Rain prevented any further play.
- Milton Shumba (Zim) made his ODI debut.
- World Cup Super League points: Ireland 5, Zimbabwe 5.

=== 3rd ODI ===
13 September 2021
10:30
Scorecard

Zimbabwe; 131 (34 overs)	v	Ireland; 118/3 (22.2 overs)
Craig Ervine 57 (65); Andy McBrine 3/26 (8 overs)		Paul Stirling 43 (40); Wellington Masakadza 1/9 (2 overs)

Ireland won by 7 wickets (DLS method)
Stormont Cricket Ground, Belfast
Umpires: Alan Neill (Ire) and Paul Reynolds (Ire)
Player of the match: Andy McBrine (Ire)

- Ireland won the toss and elected to field.
- Ireland were set a revised target of 118 runs from 32 overs due to rain.
- World Cup Super League points: Ireland 10, Zimbabwe 0.
  Brendan Taylor played his last international match. World Cup Super League points: Ireland 10, Zimbabwe 0.
