= Pakistani cricket team in Ireland in 2024 =

International cricket tour

Pakistani men's cricket team in Ireland in 2024
	Ireland	Pakistan
- Dates: 10 – 14 May 2024
Captains	Paul Stirling (Note: Lorcan Tucker captained Ireland in the 3rd T20I.)	Babar Azam

Twenty20 International series
- Results: Pakistan won the 3-match series 2–1
Most runs	Andrew Balbirnie (128); Lorcan Tucker (128)	Babar Azam (132); Mohammad Rizwan (132)
Most wickets	Mark Adair (4)	Shaheen Afridi (7)

The Pakistan men's cricket team toured Ireland in May 2024 to play three Twenty20 International (T20I) matches against Ireland. The series formed part of both teams' preparation ahead of the 2024 ICC Men's T20 World Cup. It was the first bilateral T20I series between the two teams. In July 2023, the Pakistan Cricket Board (PCB) announced the bilateral series as a part of Pakistan's revised 2023–2025 Future Tours Programme. In March 2024, the Cricket Ireland confirmed the schedule for the tour. Pakistan had last toured Ireland in 2018.

Ireland won the opening match by 5 wickets. Pakistan levelled the series by winning the second match by 7 wickets. The tourists went on to win the third match by 6 wickets, and took the series 2–1.

== Squads ==
Ireland	Pakistan
Paul Stirling (c); Mark Adair; Ross Adair; Andrew Balbirnie; Curtis Campher; Gareth Delany; George Dockrell; Graham Hume; Barry McCarthy; Neil Rock (wk); Harry Tector; Lorcan Tucker (wk); Ben White; Craig Young	Babar Azam (c); Abbas Afridi; Abrar Ahmed; Iftikhar Ahmed; Hasan Ali; Mohammad Amir; Shaheen Afridi; Saim Ayub; Salman Ali Agha; Azam Khan (wk); Irfan Khan; Shadab Khan; Usman Khan; Haris Rauf; Mohammad Rizwan (wk); Naseem Shah; Imad Wasim; Fakhar Zaman

== T20I series ==
=== 1st T20I ===
10 May 2024
15:00
Scorecard

Pakistan; 182/6 (20 overs)	v	Ireland; 183/5 (19.5 overs)
Babar Azam 57 (43); Craig Young 2/27 (4 overs)		Andrew Balbirnie 77 (55); Abbas Afridi 2/36 (3.5 overs)

Ireland won by 5 wickets
Castle Avenue, Dublin
Umpires: Mark Hawthorne (Ire) and Jonathan Kennedy (Ire)
Player of the match: Andrew Balbirnie (Ire)

- Ireland won the toss and elected to field.
- This was Ireland's first win against Pakistan in T20Is.

=== 2nd T20I ===
12 May 2024
15:00
Scorecard

Ireland; 193/7 (20 overs)	v	Pakistan; 195/3 (16.5 overs)
Lorcan Tucker 51 (34); Shaheen Afridi 3/49 (4 overs)		Fakhar Zaman 78 (40); Graham Hume 1/32 (3 overs)

Pakistan won by 7 wickets
Castle Avenue, Dublin
Umpires: Roland Black (Ire) and Aidan Seaver (Ire)
Player of the match: Mohammad Rizwan (Pak)

- Pakistan won the toss and elected to field.

=== 3rd T20I ===
14 May 2024
15:00
Scorecard

Ireland; 178/7 (20 overs)	v	Pakistan; 181/4 (17 overs)
Lorcan Tucker 73 (41); Shaheen Afridi 3/14 (4 overs)		Babar Azam 75 (42); Mark Adair 3/28 (4 overs)

Pakistan won by 6 wickets
Castle Avenue, Dublin
Umpires: Roland Black (Ire) and Mark Hawthorne (Ire)
Player of the match: Shaheen Afridi (Pak)

- Pakistan won the toss and elected to field
