= List of Ireland Twenty20 International cricketers =

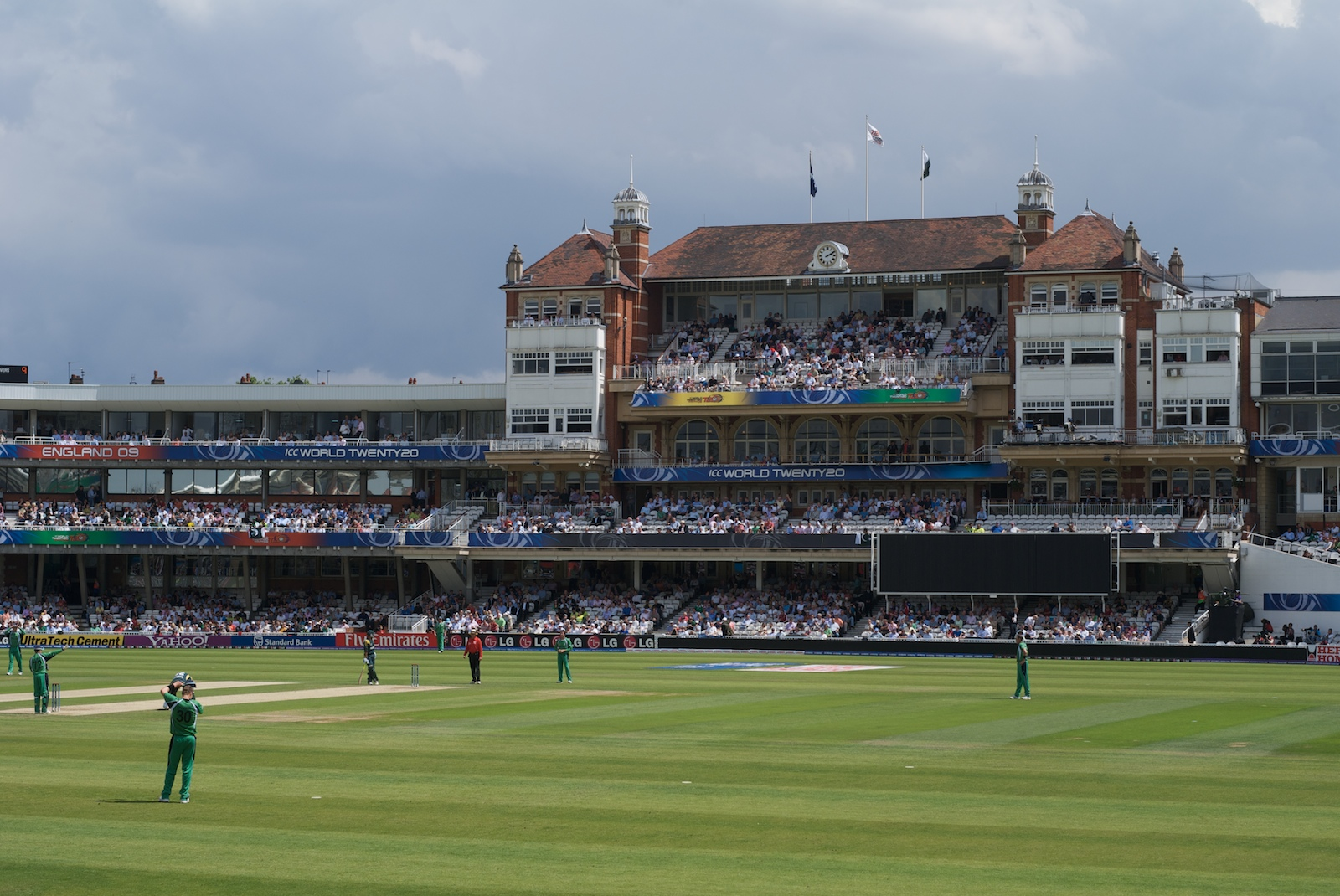
Ireland playing Pakistan in a Twenty20 International at The Oval during the 2009 ICC World Twenty20

A Twenty20 International (T20I) is an international cricket match between two teams that have official ODI status, as determined by the International Cricket Council. It is played under the rules of Twenty20 cricket and is the shortest form of the game. The first such match was played on 17 February 2005 between Australia and New Zealand. The Ireland cricket team played its first T20I match on 2 August 2008, against Scotland as part of the 2008 ICC World Twenty20 Qualifier, winning the match by 4 wickets.

This list comprises all members of the Ireland cricket team who have played at least one T20I match. It is initially arranged in the order in which each player won his first Twenty20 cap. Where more than one player won his first Twenty20 cap in the same match, those players are listed alphabetically by surname.

== Key ==
General

- ‡ – Captain
- † – Wicket-keeper
- First – Year of debut
- Last – Year of latest game
- Mat – Number of matches played

Batting

- Runs – Runs scored in career
- HS – Highest score
- Avg – Runs scored per dismissal
- * – Batsman remained not out
- 50 – Half-centuries scored
- 100 – Centuries scored

Bowling

- Balls – Balls bowled in career
- Wkt – Wickets taken in career
- BBI – Best bowling in an innings
- Ave – Average runs per wicket

Fielding

- Ca – Catches taken
- St – Stumpings taken

== Players ==
Statistics are correct as of 28 June 2026.

Ireland T20I cricketers
| General | | | | | Batting | | | | | Bowling | | | | Fielding | | Ref(s) |
| Cap | Name | First | Last | Mat | Runs | HS | Avg | 100 | 50 | Balls | Wkt | BBI | Ave | Ca | St | Ref(s) |
|---|---|---|---|---|---|---|---|---|---|---|---|---|---|---|---|---|
| 1 | Andre Botha | 2008 | 2010 | 14 | 130 | 38 | 13.00 | 0 | 0 | 204 | 21 | 3/14 | 8.76 | 8 | 0 | |
| 2 | Peter Connell | 2008 | 2010 | 9 | 4 | 3* | 4.00 | 0 | 0 | 153 | 10 | 3/8 | 15.60 | 3 | 0 | |
| 3 | Alex Cusack | 2008 | 2015 | 37 | 229 | 65 | 15.26 | 1 | 0 | 606 | 35 | 4/11 | 20.40 | 7 | 0 | |
| 4 | Trent Johnston | 2008 | 2013 | 30 | 249 | 62 | 20.75 | 1 | 0 | 594 | 32 | 4/22 | 19.87 | 9 | 0 | |
| 5 | Kyle McCallan | 2008 | 2009 | 9 | 11 | 9* | 11.00 | 0 | 0 | 131 | 8 | 2/26 | 19.00 | 3 | 0 | |
| 6 | Kevin O'Brien | 2008 | 2021 | 110 | 1,973 | 124 | 21.21 | 5 | 1 | 917 | 58 | 4/45 | 19.81 | 40 | 0 | |
| 7 | Niall O'Brien † | 2008 | 2016 | 30 | 466 | 50 | 17.92 | 1 | 0 | – | – | – | – | 17 | 10 | |
| 8 | William Porterfield ‡ | 2008 | 2018 | 61 | 1,079 | 72 | 20.35 | 3 | 0 | – | – | – | – | 22 | 0 | |
| 9 | Reinhardt Strydom | 2008 | 2008 | 4 | 6 | 5* | 6.00 | 0 | 0 | – | – | – | – | 1 | 0 | |
| 10 | Andrew White | 2008 | 2012 | 18 | 137 | 29 | 22.83 | 0 | 0 | 24 | 2 | 2/18 | 9.00 | 2 | 0 | |
| 11 | Gary Wilson †‡ | 2008 | 2020 | 81 | 1,268 | 65* | 21.13 | 3 | 0 | – | – | – | – | 40 | 7 | |
| 12 | Jeremy Bray | 2009 | 2009 | 2 | 2 | 2 | 1.00 | 0 | 0 | – | – | – | – | 2 | 0 | |
| 13 | John Mooney | 2009 | 2015 | 27 | 231 | 31* | 16.50 | 0 | 0 | 156 | 10 | 2/7 | 17.60 | 13 | 0 | |
| 14 | Boyd Rankin | 2009 | 2020 | 48 | 64 | 16* | 9.14 | 0 | 0 | 1,044 | 54 | 3/16 | 22.12 | 16 | 0 | (Note: Boyd Rankin has also played Twenty20 International cricket for England. Only his record for Ireland is given above.) |
| 15 | Regan West | 2009 | 2009 | 5 | 11 | 8 | 3.66 | 0 | 0 | 114 | 3 | 1/23 | 47.33 | 1 | 0 | |
| 16 | Paul Stirling ‡ | 2009 | 2026 | 163 | 3,895 | 115* | 26.31 | 24 | 1 | 546 | 20 | 3/21 | 33.95 | 44 | 0 | |
| 17 | George Dockrell | 2010 | 2026 | 159 | 1,426 | 58* | 20.37 | 2 | 0 | 1,730 | 91 | 4/20 | 22.10 | 77 | 0 | |
| 18 | Phil Eaglestone | 2010 | 2010 | 1 | – | – | – | – | – | 12 | 0 | – | – | 0 | 0 | |
| 19 | Gary Kidd | 2010 | 2010 | 1 | 1 | 1* | – | – | – | 18 | 0 | – | – | 0 | 0 | |
| 20 | Nigel Jones | 2010 | 2012 | 5 | 42 | 14* | 21.00 | 0 | 0 | 12 | 0 | – | – | 1 | 0 | |
| 21 | Ed Joyce | 2012 | 2014 | 16 | 404 | 78* | 36.72 | 1 | 0 | – | – | – | – | 5 | 0 | (Note: Ed Joyce has also played Twenty20 International cricket for England. Only his record for Ireland is given above.) |
| 22 | Rory McCann † | 2012 | 2012 | 3 | 1 | 1 | 1.00 | 0 | 0 | – | – | – | – | 1 | 2 | |
| 23 | Max Sorensen | 2012 | 2016 | 26 | 92 | 26 | 18.40 | 0 | 0 | 390 | 26 | 3/17 | 18.11 | 9 | 0 | |
| 24 | Andrew Poynter | 2012 | 2016 | 19 | 219 | 57 | 19.90 | 1 | 0 | – | – | – | – | 2 | 0 | |
| 25 | Tim Murtagh | 2012 | 2016 | 14 | 26 | 12* | 13.00 | 0 | 0 | 268 | 13 | 3/23 | 24.92 | 3 | 0 | |
| 26 | James Shannon | 2013 | 2018 | 8 | 111 | 60 | 13.87 | 1 | 0 | 6 | 0 | – | – | 1 | 0 | |
| 27 | Stuart Thompson | 2014 | 2019 | 41 | 328 | 56 | 14.90 | 1 | 0 | 474 | 18 | 4/18 | 37.22 | 23 | 0 | |
| 28 | Andrew McBrine | 2014 | 2022 | 32 | 155 | 36 | 12.91 | 0 | 0 | 408 | 23 | 2/7 | 21.17 | 13 | 0 | |
| 29 | John Anderson | 2015 | 2015 | 4 | 12 | 9 | 6.00 | 0 | 0 | 6 | 0 | – | – | 0 | 0 | |
| 30 | Tyrone Kane | 2015 | 2023 | 9 | 45 | 26* | 15.00 | 0 | 0 | 92 | 9 | 3/19 | 15.88 | 1 | 0 | |
| 31 | Graeme McCarter | 2015 | 2015 | 3 | – | – | – | – | – | 30 | 0 | – | – | 0 | 0 | |
| 32 | Stuart Poynter † | 2015 | 2019 | 25 | 240 | 39 | 16.00 | 0 | 0 | – | – | – | – | 13 | 2 | |
| 33 | David Rankin | 2015 | 2016 | 2 | 49 | 34 | 24.50 | 0 | 0 | – | – | – | – | 0 | 0 | |
| 34 | Craig Young | 2015 | 2026 | 73 | 82 | 22 | 6.83 | 0 | 0 | 1,429 | 87 | 4/13 | 22.24 | 12 | 0 | |
| 35 | Andrew Balbirnie ‡ | 2015 | 2024 | 110 | 2,392 | 83 | 23.45 | 12 | 0 | – | – | – | – | 40 | 0 | |
| 36 | Josh Little | 2016 | 2026 | 77 | 132 | 22* | 11.00 | 0 | 0 | 1,692 | 85 | 4/23 | 25.15 | 19 | 0 | |
| 37 | Jacob Mulder | 2016 | 2017 | 8 | 6 | 5* | 3.00 | 0 | 0 | 174 | 12 | 4/16 | 16.00 | 2 | 0 | |
| 38 | Sean Terry | 2016 | 2016 | 1 | 4 | 4 | 4.00 | 0 | 0 | – | – | – | – | 1 | 0 | |
| 39 | Greg Thompson | 2016 | 2019 | 10 | 107 | 44 | 15.28 | 0 | 0 | – | – | – | – | 2 | 0 | |
| 40 | Lorcan Tucker ‡† | 2016 | 2026 | 93 | 1,795 | 94* | 23.01 | 12 | 0 | – | – | – | – | 63 | 11 | |
| 41 | Barry McCarthy | 2017 | 2026 | 69 | 301 | 51* | 12.04 | 1 | 0 | 1,481 | 73 | 4/30 | 29.28 | 17 | 0 | |
| 42 | Simi Singh | 2018 | 2022 | 53 | 296 | 57* | 10.20 | 1 | 0 | 965 | 44 | 3/9 | 27.84 | 16 | 0 | |
| 43 | Peter Chase | 2018 | 2019 | 12 | 7 | 4 | 7.00 | 0 | 0 | 251 | 15 | 4/35 | 27.73 | 5 | 0 | |
| 44 | Shane Getkate | 2019 | 2022 | 30 | 275 | 30 | 11.95 | 0 | 0 | 330 | 16 | 3/20 | 28.93 | 9 | 0 | |
| 45 | Mark Adair | 2019 | 2026 | 100 | 844 | 72 | 15.34 | 1 | 0 | 2,157 | 142 | 4/13 | 19.80 | 42 | 0 | |
| 46 | Gareth Delany | 2019 | 2026 | 93 | 1,294 | 89* | 20.53 | 4 | 0 | 1,244 | 60 | 3/16 | 26.08 | 30 | 0 | |
| 47 | David Delany | 2019 | 2019 | 8 | 7 | 7 | 3.50 | 0 | 0 | 171 | 8 | 2/12 | 27.75 | 0 | 0 | |
| 48 | Harry Tector | 2019 | 2026 | 100 | 1,898 | 96* | 24.97 | 9 | 0 | 258 | 12 | 2/17 | 25.41 | 66 | 0 | |
| 49 | Ben White | 2021 | 2025 | 38 | 27 | 7* | 13.50 | 0 | 0 | 720 | 36 | 4/20 | 27.38 | 6 | 0 | |
| 50 | Curtis Campher | 2021 | 2026 | 70 | 1,067 | 72* | 20.92 | 4 | 0 | 823 | 32 | 4/25 | 35.31 | 39 | 0 | |
| 51 | Neil Rock † | 2021 | 2025 | 25 | 161 | 37 | 10.06 | 0 | 0 | – | – | – | – | 14 | 2 | |
| 52 | William McClintock | 2021 | 2021 | 5 | 34 | 15* | 11.33 | 0 | 0 | – | – | – | – | – | – | |
| 53 | Conor Olphert | 2022 | 2022 | 2 | – | – | – | – | – | 30 | 0 | – | – | 0 | 0 | |
| 54 | Fionn Hand | 2022 | 2025 | 14 | 63 | 36 | 9.00 | 0 | 0 | 164 | 7 | 3/18 | 38.85 | 3 | 0 | |
| 55 | Graham Hume | 2022 | 2025 | 10 | 38 | 20* | 19.00 | 0 | 0 | 188 | 11 | 3/17 | 27.45 | 1 | 0 | |
| 56 | Ross Adair | 2023 | 2026 | 23 | 531 | 100 | 23.08 | 1 | 1 | – | – | – | – | 9 | 0 | |
| 57 | Stephen Doheny † | 2023 | 2023 | 3 | 19 | 15 | 6.33 | 0 | 0 | – | – | – | – | 2 | 0 | |
| 58 | Matthew Humphreys | 2023 | 2026 | 20 | 14 | 7 | 2.80 | 0 | 0 | 449 | 29 | 4/13 | 18.27 | 5 | 0 | |
| 59 | Theo van Woerkom | 2023 | 2023 | 1 | – | – | – | – | – | 6 | 0 | – | – | 0 | 0 | |
| 60 | Tim Tector | 2025 | 2026 | 8 | 121 | 38 | 17.28 | 0 | 0 | – | – | – | – | 5 | 0 | |
| 61 | Liam McCarthy | 2025 | 2026 | 3 | 25 | 16* | 12.50 | 0 | 0 | 66 | 1 | 1/29 | 132.00 | 1 | 0 | |
| 62 | Ben Calitz | 2025 | 2026 | 11 | 174 | 37 | 19.33 | 0 | 0 | – | – | – | – | 8 | 0 | |
| 63 | Matt Hollard | 2026 | 2026 | 2 | – | – | – | – | – | 48 | 6 | 3/26 | 9.00 | 1 | 0 | |
| 64 | Jai Moondra | 2026 | 2026 | 2 | 3 | 2* | – | – | – | 48 | 5 | 3/32 | 11.40 | 1 | 0 | |

== See also ==
- Twenty20 International
- Ireland cricket team
- List of Ireland Test cricketers
- List of Ireland ODI cricketers
- List of Ireland Twenty20 International cricket records
