= South African cricket team in Ireland in 2021 =

International cricket tour

	Ireland	South Africa
- Dates: 11 – 24 July 2021
Captains	Andrew Balbirnie	Temba Bavuma

One Day International series
- Results: 3-match series drawn 1–1
Most runs	Andrew Balbirnie (174)	Janneman Malan (261)
Most wickets	Josh Little (4)	Andile Phehlukwayo (6)
- Player of the series: Janneman Malan (SA)

Twenty20 International series
- Results: South Africa won the 3-match series 3–0
Most runs	Andrew Balbirnie (55)	David Miller (139)
Most wickets	Mark Adair (5)	Tabraiz Shamsi (7)
- Player of the series: David Miller (SA)

The South Africa cricket team toured Ireland in July 2021 to play three One Day International (ODI) and three Twenty20 International (T20I) matches. The ODI series formed part of the inaugural 2020–2023 ICC Cricket World Cup Super League. Cricket Ireland confirmed the fixtures in February 2021. Originally, the first and the third T20I matches were scheduled take place on 20 and 25 July respectively. However, in June 2021, Cricket Ireland made a minor change to the tour itinerary by moving both of those matches forward by one day. It was South Africa's first full limited overs tour of Ireland, after previously playing one ODI in Belfast in June 2007. The opening T20I fixture was the first time the two teams had played each other in that format.

Only 40.2 overs of Ireland's innings in the first ODI were possible due to rain, with the match finishing as a no result. Ireland won the second ODI by 43 runs to record their first ever win against South Africa in international cricket. South Africa won the third ODI by 70 runs to draw the series 1–1. South Africa won the first two T20I matches to win the series with a match to spare. South Africa won the third T20I by 49 runs to win the series 3–0.

== Squads ==
ODIs		T20Is	
Ireland	South Africa	Ireland	South Africa
Andrew Balbirnie (c); Mark Adair; Curtis Campher; George Dockrell; Graham Kennedy; Jeremy Lawlor; Josh Little; Andy McBrine; Graeme McCarter; Barry McCarthy; William Porterfield; Simi Singh; Paul Stirling; Harry Tector; Lorcan Tucker (wk); Craig Young	Temba Bavuma (c); Quinton de Kock (wk); Bjorn Fortuin; Beuran Hendricks; Reeza Hendricks; Heinrich Klaasen; George Linde; ~~Sisanda Magala~~; Keshav Maharaj; Janneman Malan; Aiden Markram; David Miller; Lungi Ngidi; Anrich Nortje; Andile Phehlukwayo; Dwaine Pretorius; Kagiso Rabada; Tabraiz Shamsi; Rassie van der Dussen; Kyle Verreynne; Lizaad Williams	Andrew Balbirnie (c); Mark Adair; George Dockrell; Stephen Doheny; Shane Getkate; Josh Little; Barry McCarthy; William McClintock; Kevin O'Brien; ~~Neil Rock~~; Simi Singh; Paul Stirling; Harry Tector; Lorcan Tucker (wk); Ben White; Craig Young	Temba Bavuma (c); Quinton de Kock (wk); Bjorn Fortuin; Beuran Hendricks; Reeza Hendricks; Heinrich Klaasen; George Linde; ~~Sisanda Magala~~; Keshav Maharaj; Janneman Malan; Aiden Markram; David Miller; Wiaan Mulder; Lungi Ngidi; Anrich Nortje; Andile Phehlukwayo; Dwaine Pretorius; Kagiso Rabada; Tabraiz Shamsi; Rassie van der Dussen; Kyle Verreynne; Lizaad Williams

Prior to the tour, Sisanda Magala was ruled out of South Africa's squad due to an ankle injury with Beuran Hendricks named as his replacement. Wiaan Mulder was also added to South Africa's T20I squad. Ahead of the first ODI, Jeremy Lawlor was added to Ireland's squad. Neil Rock was ruled out of Ireland's T20I after testing positive for COVID-19, with Stephen Doheny named as his replacement.

== ODI series ==
=== 1st ODI ===
11 July 2021
10:45
Scorecard

Ireland; 195/4 (40.2 overs)	v	South Africa
Andrew Balbirnie 65 (79); Kagiso Rabada 2/43 (8.2 overs)

No result
Malahide Cricket Ground, Dublin
Umpires: Roland Black (Ire) and Alan Neill (Ire)

- South Africa won the toss and elected to field.
- No further play was possible due to rain.
- World Cup Super League points: Ireland 5, South Africa 5.

=== 2nd ODI ===
13 July 2021
10:45
Scorecard

Ireland; 290/5 (50 overs)	v	South Africa; 247 (48.3 overs)
Andrew Balbirnie 102 (117); Andile Phehlukwayo 2/73 (10 overs)		Janneman Malan 84 (96); Andy McBrine 2/34 (7 overs)

Ireland won by 43 runs
Malahide Cricket Ground, Dublin
Umpires: Roland Black (Ire) and Mark Hawthorne (Ire)
Player of the match: Andrew Balbirnie (Ire)

- South Africa won the toss and elected to field.
- World Cup Super League points: Ireland 10, South Africa 0.

=== 3rd ODI ===
16 July 2021
10:45
Scorecard

South Africa; 346/4 (50 overs)	v	Ireland; 276 (47.1 overs)
Janneman Malan 177* (169); Josh Little 2/53 (9 overs)		Simi Singh 100* (91); Tabraiz Shamsi 3/46 (10 overs)

South Africa won by 70 runs
Malahide Cricket Ground, Dublin
Umpires: Roland Black (Ire) and Paul Reynolds (Ire)
Player of the match: Janneman Malan (SA)

- South Africa won the toss and elected to bat.
- Lizaad Williams (SA) made his ODI debut and took a wicket with his first delivery.
- Quinton de Kock (SA) scored his 10,000th run while playing as a wicket-keeper in international cricket.
- Simi Singh (Ire) scored his first century in ODIs, and was the first century scored by a batsman batting at number 8 or lower in ODIs.
- World Cup Super League points: South Africa 10, Ireland 0.

== T20I series ==
=== 1st T20I ===
19 July 2021
16:00
Scorecard

South Africa; 165/7 (20 overs)	v	Ireland; 132/9 (20 overs)
Aiden Markram 39 (30); Mark Adair 3/39 (4 overs)		Harry Tector 36 (34); Tabraiz Shamsi 4/27 (4 overs)

South Africa won by 33 runs
Malahide Cricket Ground, Dublin
Umpires: Mark Hawthorne (Ire) and Alan Neill (Ire)
Player of the match: Tabraiz Shamsi (SA)

- Ireland won the toss and elected to field.

=== 2nd T20I ===
22 July 2021
16:00
Scorecard

South Africa; 159/7 (20 overs)	v	Ireland; 117 (19.3 overs)
David Miller 75* (44); Paul Stirling 2/12 (3 overs)		Shane Getkate 24 (18); Tabraiz Shamsi 3/14 (4 overs)

South Africa won by 42 runs
Stormont Cricket Ground, Belfast
Umpires: Roland Black (Ire) and Paul Reynolds (Ire)
Player of the match: David Miller (SA)

- South Africa won the toss and elected to bat.

=== 3rd T20I ===
24 July 2021
16:00
Scorecard

South Africa; 189/2 (20 overs)	v	Ireland; 140/9 (20 overs)
Temba Bavuma 72 (51); Simi Singh 1/27 (4 overs)		Andrew Balbirnie 27 (22); Wiaan Mulder 2/10 (2 overs)

South Africa won by 49 runs
Stormont Cricket Ground, Belfast
Umpires: Mark Hawthorne (Ire) and Alan Neill (Ire)
Player of the match: Temba Bavuma (SA)

- South Africa won the toss and elected to bat.
- Ben White (Ire) made his T20I debut.
