= Vatsal Vaghela =

American cricketer (born 2002)

Personal information
- Full name: Vatsal Mahesh Vaghela
- Born: 20 March 2002 (age 24); Milpitas, California, United States
- Batting: Left-handed
- Bowling: Slow left arm Orthodox
- Role: Batting all rounder
- Relatives: Isani Vaghela (sister)

International information
- National side: United States
- T20I debut (cap 23): 23 December 2021 v Ireland
- Last T20I: 20 April 2025 v PNG

Career statistics
Competition	T20I
Matches	3
Runs scored	29
Batting average	29.00
100s/50s	0/0
Top score	29
Balls bowled	60
Wickets	7
Bowling average	5.71
5 wickets in innings	0
10 wickets in match	0
Best bowling	3/12
Catches/stumpings	2/–
- Source: Cricinfo, 15 February 2026

Vatsal Mahesh Vaghela (born 20 March 2002) is an American cricketer who plays as a bowler for the United States national cricket team. He started playing American youth cricket with the Northern California Cricket Association. He plays for Golden State Grizzles in Minor League Cricket.

== Biography ==
Vaghela was born and raised in California to an Indian immigrant family. His sister, Isani Vaghela, also plays international cricket for the United States.

In December 2021, Vaghela was named in the United States Twenty20 International (T20I) squad for their series against Ireland. He made his Twenty20 International (T20I) debut on 23 December 2021, for the United States against Ireland.
