= Marty Kain =

American cricketer (born 1988)

Personal information
- Full name: Martin Owen Kain
- Born: 16 May 1988 (age 38); Nelson, New Zealand
- Batting: Left-handed
- Bowling: Left-arm orthodox
- Role: All rounder

International information
- National side: United States
- T20I debut (cap 23): 22 December 2021 v Ireland
- Last T20I: 17 July 2022 v PNG
- Source: Cricinfo, 17 July 2022

Marty Kain (born 16 May 1988) is a New Zealand-born American cricketer who played for Central Districts between 2009 and 2017 and currently plays for the United States . In June 2020, he spent a stint as the head coach of the Thessaloniki Star cricket team in Greece.

In June 2021, he was selected to take part in the Minor League Cricket tournament in the United States following the players' draft. In December 2021, Kain was named in the United States' Twenty20 International (T20I) squad for their series against Ireland. He was later added to the USA's One Day International (ODI) squad for their matches against Ireland. He made his T20I debut on 22 December 2021, for the United States against Ireland.
