= William McClintock (Irish cricketer) =

Irish cricketer (born 1997)

Personal information
- Full name: William McClintock
- Born: 1 January 1997 (age 29); Derry, Northern Ireland
- Batting: Right-handed
- Bowling: Right-arm medium
- Role: Batsman
- Relatives: Gary McClintock (brother)

International information
- National side: Ireland
- T20I debut (cap 52): 1 September 2021 v Zimbabwe
- Last T20I: 23 December 2021 v United States

Domestic team information
- Years: Team
- 2014–present: North West Warriors

Career statistics
Competition	T20I	LA	T20
Matches	5	11	21
Runs scored	34	144	243
Batting average	11.33	20.57	17.35
100s/50s	0/0	0/1	0/1
Top score	15*	72*	54
Balls bowled	–	–	24
Wickets	–	–	0
Bowling average	–	–	–
5 wickets in innings	–	–	–
10 wickets in match	–	–	–
Best bowling	–	–	–
Catches/stumpings	0/–	1/–	4/–
- Source: Cricinfo, 29 May 2022

William McClintock (born 1 January 1997) is an Irish cricketer from Northern Ireland. McClintock made his international debut for the Ireland cricket team in September 2021.

== Biography ==
He made his Twenty20 cricket debut for North West Warriors in the 2017 Inter-Provincial Trophy on 26 May 2017. Prior to his Twenty20 debut, he was part of Ireland's squad for the 2016 Under-19 Cricket World Cup. He made his List A debut for North West Warriors in the 2017 Inter-Provincial Cup on 2 July 2017.

In June 2021, McClintock was named in Ireland's Twenty20 International (T20I) squad for their series against South Africa. In August 2021, McClintock was again named in Ireland's T20I squad, this time for their series against Zimbabwe. McClintock made his T20I debut on 1 September 2021, for Ireland against Zimbabwe.
