= Magheramason =

Village in County Tyrone, Northern Ireland

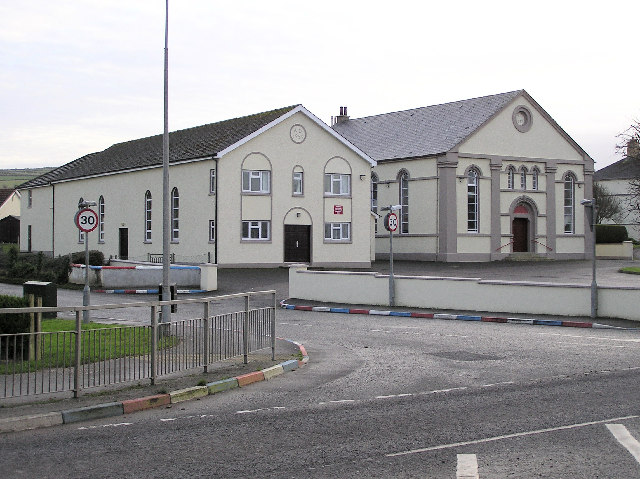
Presbyterian Church, Magheramason

Magheramason (from Irish Machaire Measáin) is a small village and townland in County Tyrone, Northern Ireland. The village sits near the County Londonderry/County Tyrone border, five miles (8.0 km) from the city of Derry and nine miles (14 km) from the town of Strabane. In the 2001 census, it had a population of 393 people. It lies within the Derry City and Strabane District Council area.

== Religion ==
In the 1870s, Presbyterians living in the Magheramason area began a campaign to have their own congregation. In August 1877, work began on a meeting house at Magheramason on a site granted by the Duke of Abercorn. The opening service in the new church took place on 17 November 1878, and the following year the Reverend Thomas Boyd was ordained its first minister.

== See also ==
- Bready Cricket Club Ground – Sports venue in Magheramason, Ireland
