= Mark Adair =

Irish cricketer (born 1996)

Personal information
- Full name: Mark Richard Adair
- Born: 27 March 1996 (age 30); Holywood, County Down, Northern Ireland
- Nickname: Sparky
- Height: 6 ft 4 in (1.93 m)
- Batting: Right-handed
- Bowling: Right-arm fast-medium
- Role: All-rounder
- Relatives: Ross Adair (brother)

International information
- National side: Ireland (2019–present)
- Test debut (cap 17): 24 July 2019 v England
- Last Test: 27 May 2026 v New Zealand
- ODI debut (cap 55): 3 May 2019 v England
- Last ODI: 12 August 2026 v Afghanistan
- ODI shirt no.: 32
- T20I debut (cap 45): 12 July 2019 v Zimbabwe
- Last T20I: 14 February 2026 v Oman
- T20I shirt no.: 32

Domestic team information
- Years: Team
- 2014–present: Northern Knights
- 2015–2017: Warwickshire
- 2026: Belfast Wolves

Career statistics
Competition	Test	ODI	T20I	FC
Matches	8	57	100	21
Runs scored	397	488	844	900
Batting average	33.08	16.82	15.34	32.14
100s/50s	0/2	0/0	0/1	0/5
Top score	88	32	72	91
Balls bowled	1,312	2,667	2,157	2,727
Wickets	28	77	142	52
Bowling average	27.89	33.07	19.80	29.23
5 wickets in innings	1	0	0	1
10 wickets in match	0	0	0	0
Best bowling	5/39	4/19	4/13	5/39
Catches/stumpings	4/–	29/–	42/–	15/–
- Source: ESPNCricinfo, 27 September 2026

Mark Richard Adair (born 27 March 1996) is a Northern Irish professional cricketer who plays as a right-arm fast-medium bowler and right-handed batter. He has represented the Ireland cricket team since 2019, and Northern Knights since 2014. As of June 2026, Adair ranks second amongst the highest wicket-takers in Tests and first in Twenty20 Internationals (T20Is) for Ireland.

== Domestic career ==
Adair's first wicket in first-class cricket was Marcus Trescothick. He made his Twenty20 debut on 27 May 2016 for Warwickshire against Worcestershire Rapids in the 2016 NatWest T20 Blast and his List A debut in the 2017 Royal London One-Day Cup on 10 May 2017.

In May 2022, in the 2022 Inter-Provincial Cup, Adair scored his first century in List A cricket, with 108 runs against Munster Reds.

== International career ==
In June 2016, Adair was named in Ireland's One Day International (ODI) squad for their series against Afghanistan, that took place the following month, but he did not play. In May 2019, he was added to Ireland's squad for the one-off ODI against England. He made his ODI debut for Ireland against England on 3 May 2019.

In June 2019, Adair was named in the Ireland Wolves squad for their home series against the Scotland A cricket team. Later the same month, he was named in Ireland's squad for their series against Zimbabwe.

In July 2019, Adair was named in Ireland's Test squad for their one-off match against England at Lord's. He made his Twenty20 International (T20I) debut for Ireland against Zimbabwe on 12 July 2019. He made his Test debut for Ireland, against England, on 24 July 2019. The following month, he was awarded a central contract by Cricket Ireland.

In September 2019, Adair was named in Ireland's squad for the 2019 ICC T20 World Cup Qualifier tournament in the United Arab Emirates. He was the leading wicket-taker for Ireland in the tournament, with twelve dismissals in eight matches.

On 10 July 2020, Adair was named in Ireland's 21-man squad to travel to England to start training behind closed doors for the ODI series against the England cricket team. Adair was added to Ireland's squad for the third and final ODI of the series.

In February 2021, Adair was named in the Ireland Wolves' squad for their tour to Bangladesh. In July 2021, he was named in the Ireland's ODI squad against South Africa. In September 2021, Adair was named in Ireland's provisional squad for the 2021 ICC Men's T20 World Cup. Adair was named in Ireland's Test squad for their tour of Bangladesh in March 2023. He was also named in the T20I and ODI squads for the tour.

On 7 December 2023, Adair became the first male cricketer from Ireland to take 100 wickets in T20Is.

In May 2024, he was named in Ireland's squad for the 2024 ICC Men's T20 World Cup tournament.
