= Neil Rock =

Irish cricketer

Personal information
- Full name: Neil Alan Rock
- Born: 24 September 2000 (age 26); Dublin, Ireland
- Nickname: Pebbles
- Batting: Left-handed
- Role: Wicket-keeper

International information
- National side: Ireland
- ODI debut (cap 62): 8 January 2022 v West Indies
- Last ODI: 16 January 2022 v West Indies
- T20I debut (cap 51): 27 August 2021 v Zimbabwe
- Last T20I: 23 February 2025 v Zimbabwe

Domestic team information
- Years: Team
- 2018–present: Northern Knights
- 2020–21: Munster Reds

Career statistics
Competition	ODI	T20I	FC	LA
Matches	3	25	9	56
Runs scored	7	161	220	1,173
Batting average	3.50	10.06	24.44	27.27
100s/50s	0/0	0/0	0/1	1/5
Top score	7	37	85	102
Catches/stumpings	2/0	14/2	13/1	50/6
- Source: Cricinfo, 7 December 2025

Neil Alan Rock (born 24 September 2000) is an Irish cricketer. Rock made his international debut for the Ireland cricket team in August 2021.

== Career ==
Rock made his Twenty20 debut for Northern Knights in the 2018 Inter-Provincial Trophy on 18 May 2018. Prior to his Twenty20 debut, he was named in Ireland's squad for the 2018 Under-19 Cricket World Cup.

He made his List A debut for Northern Knights in the 2018 Inter-Provincial Cup on 28 May 2018. He made his first-class debut for Northern Knights in the 2018 Inter-Provincial Championship on 29 May 2018.

In December 2020, Rock was named in Ireland's One Day International (ODI) squad for their tour to the UAE to play the United Arab Emirates and Afghanistan. In February 2021, Rock was named in the Ireland Wolves' squad for their tour to Bangladesh. Later the same month, Rock was part of the intake for the Cricket Ireland Academy. Following the tour of Bangladesh, Rock was awarded with a retainer contract, after he impressed the selectors.

In June 2021, Rock was named in Ireland's Twenty20 International (T20I) squad for their series against South Africa. However, he did not take part in the series, after a positive test for COVID-19. In August 2021, Rock was named in Ireland's T20I and ODI squads for their series against Zimbabwe. Rock made his T20I debut on 27 August 2021, for Ireland against Zimbabwe. The following month, Rock was named in Ireland's provisional squad for the 2021 ICC Men's T20 World Cup.

In November 2021, Rock was named in Ireland's ODI squad for their series against the West Indies. He made his ODI debut 8 January 2022, for Ireland against the West Indies. Rock replaced Andy McBrine as a concussion substitute in the match.

In May 2024, he was named in Ireland's squad for the 2024 ICC Men's T20 World Cup tournament.
