= Andrew Balbirnie =

Irish cricketer

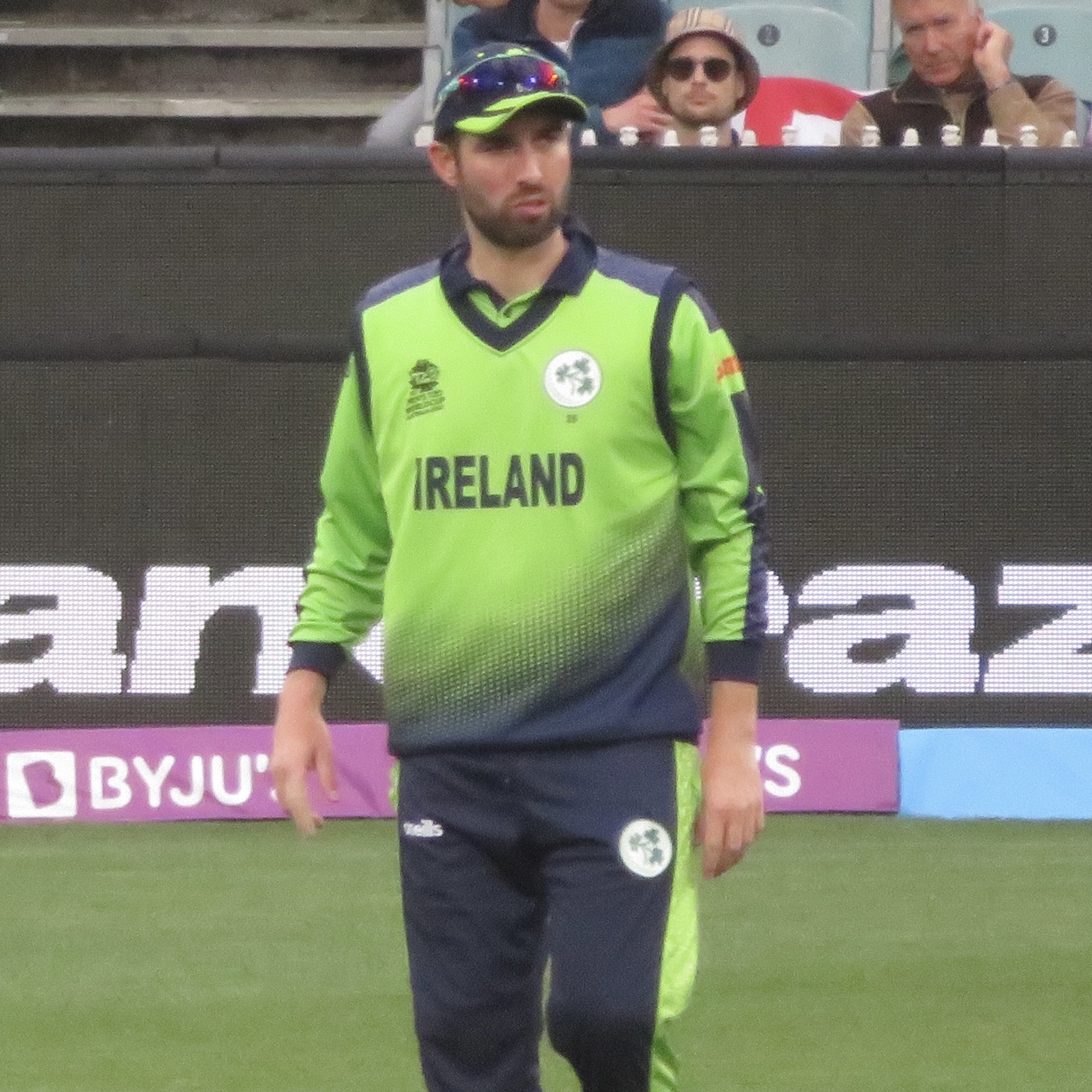
- Balbirnie in 2022

Personal information
- Full name: Andrew Balbirnie
- Born: 28 December 1990 (age 35); Dublin, Ireland
- Batting: Right-handed
- Bowling: Right-arm off break
- Role: Batsman

International information
- National side: Ireland (2010–present)
- Test debut (cap 2): 11 May 2018 v Pakistan
- Last Test: 27 May 2026 v New Zealand
- ODI debut (cap 35): 5 July 2010 v Scotland
- Last ODI: 1 November 2026 v Namibia
- ODI shirt no.: 63
- T20I debut (cap 35): 19 June 2015 v Scotland
- Last T20I: 16 June 2024 v Pakistan
- T20I shirt no.: 63

Domestic team information
- Years: Team
- 2011–2015: Middlesex (squad no. 15)
- 2011–2013: Cardiff MCCU
- 2013–2024: Leinster Lightning
- 2020–2021: Glamorgan
- 2023: Khulna Titans
- 2025: North West Warriors

Career statistics
Competition	Test	ODI	T20I	FC
Matches	13	126	110	47
Runs scored	575	3,519	2,392	1,928
Batting average	23.00	31.70	23.45	27.94
100s/50s	0/5	10/17	0/12	2/12
Top score	95	145*	83	205*
Balls bowled	6	60	–	627
Wickets	0	2	–	13
Bowling average	–	34.00	–	20.15
5 wickets in innings	–	0	–	0
10 wickets in match	–	0	–	0
Best bowling	–	1/26	–	4/23
Catches/stumpings	15/–	48/–	39/–	49/–
- Source: ESPNcricinfo, 1 November 2026

Andrew Balbirnie (born 28 December 1990) is an Irish cricketer, the current captain of the Ireland cricket team in Test cricket. Balbirnie is a right-handed batsman and an occasional wicket-keeper. He was born in Dublin and was educated at St. Andrew's College. He was one of the 11 cricketers to play in Ireland's first ever Test match, against Pakistan, in May 2018. In December 2018, he was one of 19 players to be awarded a central contract by Cricket Ireland for the 2019 season.

In November 2019, Balbirnie was named as the captain of Ireland's Test and ODI team, after William Porterfield stepped down. Later the same month, he was also named as the captain of Ireland's Twenty20 International (T20I) team, replacing Gary Wilson. In January 2020, he was one of 19 players to be awarded a central contract from Cricket Ireland, the first year in which all contracts were awarded on a full-time basis.

== Early and domestic career ==
Balbirnie has represented Ireland at U-19 level, playing nine Youth One Day Internationals. In 2009, he captained Ireland's Under-19 World Cup Qualifier winning squad. Victory in the tournament allowed Ireland Under-19's to take part in the 2010 U-19 Cricket World Cup.

On 15 August 2017, Balbirnie scored his maiden first-class century, when Ireland played the Netherlands in the 2015–17 ICC Intercontinental Cup.

Balbirnie was the leading run-scorer in the 2018 Inter-Provincial Trophy tournament, with 262 runs in six matches. He was also the leading run-scorer for Leinster Lightning in the 2018 Inter-Provincial Championship, with 302 runs in four matches.

In July 2019, Balbirnie was selected to play for the Dublin Chiefs in the inaugural edition of the Euro T20 Slam cricket tournament. However, the following month the tournament was cancelled.

== International career ==
Balbirnie was a member of Ireland's 2010 ICC World Cricket League Division One winning team. During the tournament, he made his List A debut for Ireland, in what was also his debut One Day International which came against Scotland. He played three further One Day Internationals during the tournament.

In January 2015, Balbirnie was named in Ireland's 15 man squad for the 2015 Cricket World Cup.

Balbirnie made his Twenty20 International debut against Scotland on 19 June 2015, although no play was possible due to rain.

In February 2016, Balbirnie was named in Ireland's 15 man squad for the 2016 T20 World Cup.

Balbirnie was part of the Ireland A team which toured Bangladesh in October 2017 to play one first-class match and five limited overs matches against the Bangladesh A team.

In May 2018, Balbirnie was named in a 14-man squad for Ireland's first ever Test match, which was played against Pakistan later the same month. He made his Test debut for Ireland, against Pakistan, on 11 May 2018. He was dismissed for a pair, therefore becoming the forty-fourth batsman, and first for Ireland, to get a pair on debut in Test cricket.

In January 2019, Balbirnie was named in Ireland's squad for their one-off Test against Afghanistan in Dehradun, India. In May 2019, in the opening match of the 2019 Ireland Tri-Nation Series against the West Indies, Balbirnie played in his 100th international match for Ireland.

In September 2019, Balbirnie was named in Ireland's squad for the 2019 ICC T20 World Cup Qualifier tournament in the United Arab Emirates.

In November 2019, Balbirnie was named as Ireland's all formats captain.

On 10 July 2020, Balbirnie was named in Ireland's 21-man squad to travel to England to start training behind closed doors for the ODI series against the England cricket team. In the third and final match of the series, which Ireland won by seven wickets, Balbirnie scored his 2,000th run in ODI cricket.

On 13 July 2021, Balbirnie led Ireland to their first ever ODI victory against South Africa. He also made his seventh ODI century in the match, scoring 102 off 117 deliveries before getting dismissed by Kagiso Rabada. In September 2021, Balbirnie was named the captain of Ireland's provisional squad for the 2021 ICC Men's T20 World Cup.

On 26 October 2022, Balbirnie scored a T20I half-century, scoring 62 off 47 deliveries to lead Ireland to a victory over England in the 2022 ICC Men's T20 World Cup.

On 4 July 2023, Balbirnie has stepped down from his captaincy in limited-overs cricket, after Ireland failed to qualify for the 2023 World Cup.

In March 2024, Balbirnie led Ireland to its first win in Test cricket, against Afghanistan in Abu Dhabi, scoring an unbeaten half-century in the fourth innings. In May 2024, he was named in Ireland's squad for the 2024 ICC Men's T20 World Cup tournament.
