= Josh Little =

Irish cricketer (born 1999)

Joshua Little
Personal information
- Full name: Joshua Brian Little
- Born: 1 November 1999 (age 27); Dublin, Ireland
- Batting: Right-handed
- Bowling: Left-arm fast
- Role: Bowler
- Relatives: Hannah Little (sister); Louise Little (sister)

International information
- National side: Ireland (2016–present)
- ODI debut (cap 56): 3 May 2019 v England
- Last ODI: 25 May 2025 v West Indies
- ODI shirt no.: 82
- T20I debut (cap 36): 5 September 2016 v Hong Kong
- Last T20I: 14 February 2026 v Oman
- T20I shirt no.: 82

Domestic team information
- Years: Team
- 2017–present: Leinster Lightning
- 2021: Dambulla Giants
- 2022–2023: Manchester Originals
- 2023: Pretoria Capitals
- 2023–2024: Gujarat Titans
- 2024: Welsh Fire
- 2025: Middlesex (squad no. 82)
- 2026: Dublin Guardians

Career statistics
Competition	ODI	T20I	FC	LA
Matches	42	77	6	65
Runs scored	81	132	68	137
Batting average	8.10	11.00	17.00	9.13
100s/50s	0/0	0/0	0/0	0/0
Top score	29	22*	27	29
Balls bowled	2,021	1,692	441	2,910
Wickets	61	85	6	85
Bowling average	34.34	25.15	53.33	33.14
5 wickets in innings	1	0	0	0
10 wickets in match	0	0	0	0
Best bowling	6/36	4/23	3/95	6/36
Catches/stumpings	7/–	19/–	1/–	12/–
- Source: ESPNcricinfo, 19 February 2026

Joshua Brian Little (born 1 November 1999) is an Irish cricketer. He made his international debut for the Ireland cricket team in September 2016. He has also played in T20 franchise leagues, most notably for Gujarat Titans in the Indian Premier League.

== Early career ==
Josh Little emerged through Cricket Ireland's development programme, picking up softball cricket for the first time as a ten-year-old at the St Andrews Primary School and being guided by his development cricket coach in Dublin Andrew Leonard who is now a renowned broadcaster. He soon rose through the ranks during his stint at Pembroke Cricket Club through the Under-11 programme and also played alongside the likes of future Irish captain Andy Balbirnie for Pembroke Cricket Club in Under-15 age category level matches. Little also plied his trade in the sport of field hockey at Monkstown Hockey Club and even represented Ireland's national field hockey team at age-group level especially for the Irish Under-16 side. At the age of 16, he was used as a net bowler for Ireland's bilateral home series against Sri Lanka in 2016.

== International career ==
Little made his Twenty20 International (T20I) debut against Hong Kong on 5 September 2016. Little was 16 years old at the time of his debut, making him the second-youngest to have played at that level, after Hong Kong's Waqas Khan. Prior to his T20I debut, Little was named in Ireland's squad for the 2016 Under-19 Cricket World Cup.

Little was originally named in Ireland's T20I squad for their series against Afghanistan in India in March 2017. However, he had to withdraw because of education commitments. In December 2017, he was named in Ireland's squad for the 2018 Under-19 Cricket World Cup.

In January 2019, Little was named in Ireland's T20I squads for the Oman Quadrangular Series and the series against Afghanistan in India. In April 2019, he was named in Ireland's One Day International (ODI) squads for the one-off match against England and the 2019 Ireland Tri-Nation Series. He made his ODI debut for Ireland against England on 3 May 2019.

On 10 July 2020, Little was named in Ireland's 21-man squad that travelled to England to start training behind closed doors for the ODI series against the England cricket team.

In February 2021, Little was named in the Ireland Wolves' squad for their tour to Bangladesh. In September 2021, Little was named in Ireland's provisional squad for the 2021 ICC Men's T20 World Cup.

On 4 November 2022, in a match against New Zealand in the 2022 T20 Cricket World Cup, Little took a hat-trick by dismissing Kane Williamson, James Neesham and Mitchell Santner. Little became the sixth player to claim a hat-trick in the history of ICC Men's T20 World Cup history and became the second bowler to do so during the 2022 edition of the ICC Men's T20 World Cup after Karthik Meiyappan of the United Arab Emirates. He also became the second Irish bowler to take a hat-trick in a T20I match after Curtis Campher and both in fact achieved the milestones in T20 World Cup tournaments. He ended up the 2022 T20 World Cup with seven scalps in four matches during the Super 12 phase of the tournament.

He set an Irish record for having picked up the most wickets in T20Is in a single calendar year when he picked up a tally of 39 scalps in 26 T20I matches in 2022. He was also the second highest wicket-taker in all T20Is in 2022 with only behind Tanzania's Yalinde Nkanya who had picked up 45 wickets in 28 matches. He also holds the record for having grabbed most number of wickets in T20Is by a bowler from a full member nation in a single calendar year and is also second behind for having captured the most number of wickets in T20Is in a single calendar year.

In May 2024, he was named in Ireland's squad for the 2024 ICC Men's T20 World Cup tournament.

== Domestic and T20 career ==
He excelled at the 2016 U-19 World Cup having picked up a haul of 11 wickets which also helped him to be fast-tracked into the senior Irish side within a year. It was Graham Ford who shaped the mentality of Little to make him seriously consider about making cricket as a professional career and in an exclusive interview with Sunday Times Ireland, Little described that "five-minute chat with Ford changed his entire perception of things and since then he has been head down, just gym and cricket". Ford acknowledged that Little at the age of 18 was keen more on his social life than having second thoughts about professional career and Little also missed training sessions and including an occasion he missed out to play in an interprovincial game in order to attend the music festival Electric Picnic.

Little made his List A debut for Leinster Lightning in the 2018 Inter-Provincial Cup on 19 June 2018. He made his first-class debut for Leinster Lightning in the 2018 Inter-Provincial Championship on 20 June 2018. In April 2019, he was one of five cricketers to be awarded with an Emerging Player Contract by Cricket Ireland, ahead of the 2019 domestic season.

In July 2019, Little was selected to play for the Dublin Chiefs in the inaugural edition of the Euro T20 Slam cricket tournament. However, the following month the tournament was cancelled. In November 2021, he was selected to play for the Dambulla Giants following the players' draft for the 2021 Lanka Premier League.

He received his maiden call-up to join the Manchester Originals during the 2022 season of The Hundred in an Instagram direct message from England's Phil Salt and was subsequently a mid-tournament replacement for Sean Abbott during the context of 2022 Hundred season. He was eventually Manchester Original's second highest-wicket taker during the course of the 2022 Hundred season with a wicket tally of 13 in just five innings and was only behind Paul Walter's 14 scalps. On 31 August 2022, Little achieved the best bowling figures in the history of The Hundred of 5/13. He is the fourth person to obtain a 5 wicket haul in the history of the competition sending Manchester Originals into the top three on the final day and into the playoffs.

In December 2022, Gujarat Titans bought Little in the Indian Premier League auction ahead of 2023 season. This made him the first ever Irish player to get an IPL contract. He made his IPL debut for Gujarat Titans against Chennai Super Kings on 31 March 2023, taking the figures of 1-41 from 4 overs and in the process, becoming the first Irish cricketer to play in the IPL and take a wicket.

He was picked by Multan Sultans in the PSL auction ahead of the Pakistan Super League. However, he was ruled out of the tournament due to injury, which he had picked up playing for the Pretoria Capitals in the SA20. He is to play for Abu Dhabi Knight Riders in 2024 in International League T20.

In February 2025, Little signed a contract to play for Middlesex in the T20 Blast.

== Awards ==
He was named in the ICC Men's T20I Team of the Year for the Year 2022 during the 2022 ICC Awards for his splendid performances with the ball in T20I cricket in 2022 and became the first Irish player to be inducted into ICC Men's T20I Team of the Year. In March 2023, he was awarded the Men's International Player of the Year for 2022 during the 11th Clear Treasury Irish Cricket Awards.
