= Ireland at the Cricket World Cup =

The Ireland cricket team is the cricket team representing all of Ireland. Since 2017 they have been a Full Member of the International Cricket Council. Although Cricket in Ireland has had a presence since the early 1800s, it was in 1993 the Irish Cricket Union, the predecessor to Cricket Ireland, was elected to the International Cricket Council (ICC) as an Associate member. In the 1997 ICC Trophy, Ireland narrowly missed out on qualifying for the 1999 Cricket World Cup, which was ironically co hosted by Ireland, Scotland, England and the Netherlands. Ireland qualified for the World Cup for the first time in 2007, and has since played in the 2011 and 2015 tournaments, and the 2010, 2012, and 2014 World Twenty20 competitions. Ireland's best world cup performance was in 2007, where they surprisingly qualified for the Super 8 Stages.

== Cricket World Cup Record ==
Cricket World Cup record								Qualification record				
Year	Round	Position	GP	W	L	T	NR	Pld	W	L	T	NR
(England) 1975	Not eligible (not an ICC member)							No qualifier held				
(England) 1979	Not eligible (not an ICC member)							Did not participate (not an ICC member)				
(England) (Wales) 1983	Not eligible (not an ICC member)							Did not participate (not an ICC member)				
(India) (Pakistan) 1987	Not eligible (not an ICC member)							Did not participate (not an ICC member)				
(Australia) (New Zealand) 1992	Not eligible (not an ICC member)							Did not participate (not an ICC member)				
(India) (Pakistan) (Sri Lanka) 1996	Did not qualify							7	3	4	0	0
(England) (Wales) (Scotland) (Republic of Ireland) (Netherlands) 1999	Did not qualify							10	6	3	0	1
(South Africa) (Zimbabwe) (Kenya) 2003	Did not qualify							9	4	5	0	0
(Cricket West Indies) 2007	Super 8	8/16	9	2	6	1	0	7	5	1	0	1
(India) (Sri Lanka) (Bangladesh) 2011	Group Stage	11/14	6	2	4	0	0	10	8	2	0	0
(Australia) (New Zealand) 2015	Group Stage	9/14	6	3	3	0	0	14	11	1	1	1
(England) (Wales) 2019	Did not qualify							7	4	3	0	0
(India) 2023	Did not qualify							29	8	18	0	3
(South Africa) (Zimbabwe) (Namibia) 2027	TBD							Ongoing*				
Total	Super 8 (2007)	3/12	21	7	13	1	0	93	49	37	1	6

=== World Cup Record (By Team) ===
Cricket World Cup matches (By team)
Total : 7 Wins – 1 Ties – 13 Losses – 21 games played
Against	Total	Wins	Ties	Losses
Australia	1	0	0	1
Bangladesh	2	1	0	1
England	2	1	0	1
India	2	0	0	2
Netherlands	1	1	0	0
New Zealand	1	0	0	1
Pakistan	2	1	0	1
South Africa	3	0	0	3
Sri Lanka	1	0	0	1
United Arab Emirates	1	1	0	0
West Indies	3	1	0	2
Zimbabwe	2	1	1	0
Source: Last Updated:15 March 2015

== Tournament results ==
=== 2007 World Cup ===
Squad

- Trent Johnston (c)
- Jeremy Bray
- Andre Botha
- Kenneth Carroll
- Peter Gillespie
- Dave Langford-Smith
- John Mooney
- Paul Mooney
- Eoin Morgan
- Kevin O'Brien
- Niall O'Brien (wk)
- William Porterfield
- Boyd Rankin
- Kyle McCallan
- Andrew White

Results

Group stage (Group D)				Super 8							Semifinal	Final	Overall Result
Opposition Result	Opposition Result	Opposition Result	Rank	Opposition Result	Opposition Result	Opposition Result	Opposition Result	Opposition Result	Opposition Result	Rank	Opposition Result	Opposition Result	Overall Result
Zimbabwe; Tied	Pakistan; W by 3 wickets (D/L)	West Indies; L by 8 wickets (D/L)	2	England; L by 48 runs	South Africa; L by 7 wickets (D/L)	New Zealand; L by 129 runs	Australia; L by 9 wickets	Bangladesh; W by 74 runs	Sri Lanka; L by 8 wickets	8	Did not advance		Super 8

Scorecards

Group stage (Group D)

15 March 2007
Scorecard

Ireland; 221/9 (50 overs)	v	Zimbabwe; 221 (50 overs)
Jeremy Bray 115* (137); Elton Chigumbura 2/21 (6 overs)		Stuart Matsikenyeri 73* (76); Kyle McCallan 2/56 (9 overs)

Match tied
Sabina Park, Kingston, Jamaica
Umpires: Ian Gould (Eng) and Brian Jerling (SA)
Player of the match: Jeremy Bray (Ire)

17 March 2007
Scorecard

Pakistan; 132 (45.4 overs)	v	Ireland; 133/7 (41.4 overs)
Kamran Akmal 27 (47); Boyd Rankin 3/32 (9 overs)		Niall O'Brien 72 (107); Mohammad Sami 3/29 (10 overs)

Ireland win by 3 wickets (D/L method)
Sabina Park, Kingston, Jamaica
Umpires: Billy Bowden (NZ) and Brian Jerling (SA)
Player of the match: Niall O'Brien (Ire)

- Rain and bad light reduced Ireland's target to 133 from 47 overs.

23 March 2007
Scorecard

Ireland; 183/8 (48 overs)	v	West Indies; 190/2 (38.1 overs)
Jeremy Bray 41 (72); Chris Gayle 2/23 (10 overs)		Shiv Chanderpaul 102 (113); Dave Langford-Smith 1/33 (9 overs)

West Indies win by 8 wickets (D/L method)
Sabina Park, Kingston, Jamaica
Umpires: Billy Bowden (NZ) and Ian Gould (Eng)
Player of the match: Shiv Chanderpaul (WI)

- Rain adjusted West Indies' target to 190 from 48 overs.
- Ireland qualified for the Super 8 stages despite this defeat.

Super 8

30 March 2007
Scorecard

England; 266/7 (50 overs)	v	Ireland; 218 (48.1 overs)
Paul Collingwood 90 (82); Boyd Rankin 2/28 (7 overs)		Niall O'Brien 63 (88); Andrew Flintoff 4/43 (8.1 overs)

England won by 48 runs.
Providence Stadium, Georgetown, Guyana, Guyana
Umpires: Billy Doctrove (WI) and Simon Taufel (Aus)
Player of the match: Paul Collingwood (Eng)

3 April 2007
Scorecard

Ireland; 152/8 (35 overs)	v	South Africa; 165/3 (31.3 overs)
Andrew White 30 (30); Charl Langeveldt 3/41 (7 overs)		Jacques Kallis 66* (86); Boyd Rankin 2/26 (7 overs)

South Africa won by 7 wickets (D/L method)
Providence Stadium, Georgetown, Guyana, Guyana
Umpires: Daryl Harper (Aus) and Simon Taufel (Aus)
Player of the match: Jacques Kallis (SA)

- Rain caused South Africa's target to be revised to 160 from 35 overs.

9 April 2007
Scorecard

New Zealand; 263/8 (50 overs)	v	Ireland; 134 (37.4 overs)
Peter Fulton 83 (110); Kyle McCallan 2/35 (10 overs)		Kevin O'Brien 49 (45); Daniel Vettori 4/23 (8.4 overs)

New Zealand won by 129 runs.
Providence Stadium, Georgetown, Guyana, Guyana
Umpires: Steve Bucknor (WI) and Simon Taufel (Aus)
Player of the match: Peter Fulton (NZ)

13 April 2007
Scorecard

Ireland; 91 (30 overs)	v	Australia; 92/1 (12.2 overs)
John Mooney 23 (44); Glenn McGrath 3/17 (7 overs)		Adam Gilchrist 34 (25); Trent Johnston 1/18 (3 overs)

Australia won by 9 wickets.
Kensington Oval, Bridgetown, Barbados
Umpires: Billy Bowden (NZ) and Rudi Koertzen (SA)
Player of the match: Glenn McGrath (Aus)

- Australia's win confirmed their place in the top four. Ireland could not now qualify for the semi-finals.

15 April 2007
Scorecard

Ireland; 243/7 (50 overs)	v	Bangladesh; 169 (41.2 overs)
William Porterfield 85 (136); Mashrafe Mortaza 2/38 (10 overs)		Mohammad Ashraful 35 (36); Kyle McCallan 2/25 (8 overs)

Ireland won by 74 runs.
Kensington Oval, Bridgetown, Barbados
Umpires: Billy Bowden (NZ) and Steve Bucknor (WI)
Player of the match: William Porterfield (Ire)

- Ireland's total of 243/7 was their highest in World Cup matches.
- Bangladesh's loss meant that they could not now qualify for the semi-finals.

18 April 2007
Scorecard

Ireland; 77 (27.4 overs)	v	Sri Lanka; 81/2 (10 overs)
Jeremy Bray (cricketer) 20 (29); Muttiah Muralitharan 4/19 (5 overs)		Mahela Jayawardene 39* (27); Dave Langford-Smith 1/29 (3 overs)

Sri Lanka won by 8 wickets.
National Cricket Stadium, Grenada
Umpires: Mark Benson (Eng) and Billy Doctrove (WI)
Player of the match: Farveez Maharoof (SL)

Summary

Ireland surprised many in their debut 2007 World Cup campaign. They tied their opener against Zimbabwe and famously defeated the fourth-ranked team in the world Pakistan on Saint Patrick's Day, knocking them out. In their final group match, they lost to West Indies. These results secured a spot in the Super 8s, where they lost four matches but claimed a notable 74-run win over Bangladesh.

Ireland had a great start to their campaign managing a tie against the Test nation of Zimbabwe after Jeremy Bray scored his second One Day International century. After a steady start, two wickets from Elton Chigumbura set them back to 64 for four after 15 overs. Bray carried the bat to 115 not out.

In reply, Zimbabwe made their way to 20 overs with the loss of just one wicket. However, wicket of Chamu Chibhabha and unfortunate hit-wicket of Vusi Sibanda and Brendan Taylor's run-out put Ireland back in driver's seat. After Stuart Matsikenyeri's half-century, they required 15 runs with 36 balls remaining; however, they only got six of those runs off the next 30 balls. Needing 9 runs off the last over they could manage only a couple of singles and doubles, Rainsford was run out attempting the winning run, resulting in a dramatic tie—the third in Cricket World Cup history.

Pakistan were put in to bat, and were bowled out for 132, with extras being the top scorer as Ireland offered 23 wides. Boyd Rankin took the most wickets, which included Younis Khan and top-scorer Kamran Akmal, while Andre Botha took wickets of Inzamam and opener Imran Nazir conceding just 5 runs in 8 overs.

In Ireland's innings, Bray fell early to Mohammad Sami. Ireland fell to 15 for two, but Niall O'Brien and William Porterfield added 37. He was eventually stumped for 72, before Iftikhar Anjum struck twice in two balls, Ireland now needing 20 with three wickets in hand. Kevin O'Brien and Trent Johnston took Ireland home thus eliminating Pakistan.

=== 2011 World Cup ===
Squad

- William Porterfield (c)
- Andre Botha
- George Dockrell
- Ed Joyce
- Nigel Jones
- John Mooney
- Kevin O'Brien
- Niall O'Brien (wk)
- Paul Stirling
- Gary Wilson (wk)
- Alex Cusack
- Trent Johnston
- Andrew White
- Boyd Rankin
- Albert van der Merwe

Results

Group stage (Group B)							Semifinal	Final	Overall Result
Opposition Result	Opposition Result	Opposition Result	Opposition Result	Opposition Result	Opposition Result	Rank	Opposition Result	Opposition Result	Overall Result
Bangladesh; L by 27 runs	England; 3 by 3 wickets	India; L by 5 wickets	West Indies; L by 44 runs	South Africa; L by 131 runs	Netherlands; W by 3 wickets	8	Did not advance		Group stage

Scorecards

Group stage (Group D)

25 February 2011
Scorecard

Bangladesh; 205 (49.2 overs)	v	Ireland; 178 (45 overs)
Tamim Iqbal 44 (43); Andre Botha 3/32 (9 overs)		Niall O'Brien 38 (52); Shafiul Islam 4/21 (8 overs)

Bangladesh won by 27 runs
Shere Bangla National Stadium, Mirpur, Dhaka
Umpires: Aleem Dar (Pak) and Rod Tucker (Aus)
Player of the match: Tamim Iqbal (Ban)

- Bangladesh won the toss and elected to bat.

2 March 2011
Scorecard

England; 327/8 (50 overs)	v	Ireland; 329/7 (49.1 overs)
Jonathan Trott 92 (92); Trent Johnston 2/58 (10 overs)		Kevin O'Brien 113 (63); Graeme Swann 3/47 (10 overs)

Ireland won by 3 wickets
M Chinnaswamy Stadium, Bangalore
Umpires: Aleem Dar (Pak) and Billy Bowden (NZ)
Player of the match: Kevin O'Brien (Ire)

- England won the toss and elected to bat.

6 March 2011
Scorecard

Ireland; 207 (47.5 overs)	v	India; 210/5 (46 overs)
William Porterfield 75 (104); Yuvraj Singh 5/31 (10 overs)		Yuvraj Singh 50* (75); Trent Johnston 2/16 (5 overs)

India won by 5 wickets
M Chinnaswamy Stadium, Bangalore
Umpires: Billy Bowden (NZ) and Rod Tucker (Aus)
Player of the match: Yuvraj Singh (Ind)

- India won the toss and elected to field.

11 March 2011
Scorecard

West Indies; 275 (50 overs)	v	Ireland; 231 (49 overs)
Devon Smith 107 (133); Kevin O'Brien 4/71 (9 overs)		Ed Joyce 84 (106); Sulieman Benn 4/53 (10 overs)

West Indies won by 44 runs
Punjab Cricket Association Stadium, Mohali, Chandigarh
Umpires: Asoka de Silva (SL) and Shavir Tarapore (Ind)
Player of the match: Kieron Pollard (WI)

- Ireland won the toss and elected to field.

15 March 2011
Scorecard

South Africa; 272/7 (50 overs)	v	Ireland; 141 (33.2 overs)
JP Duminy 99 (103); John Mooney 1/36 (8 overs)		Gary Wilson 31 (48); Robin Peterson 3/32 (8 overs)

South Africa won by 131 runs
Eden Gardens, Kolkata
Umpires: Kumar Dharmasena (SL) and Billy Doctrove (WI)
Player of the match: JP Duminy (SA)

- Ireland won the toss and elected to field.
- Ireland were eliminated following this defeat.

18 March 2011
Scorecard

Netherlands; 306 (50 overs)	v	Ireland; 307/4 (47.4 overs)
Ryan ten Doeschate 106 (108); Paul Stirling 2/51 (10 overs)		Paul Stirling 101 (72); Tom Cooper 2/31 (7 overs)

Ireland won by 6 wickets
Eden Gardens, Kolkata
Umpires: Billy Doctrove (WI) and Ian Gould (Eng)
Player of the match: Paul Stirling (Ire)

- Ireland won the toss and elected to field.

Summary

Though Ireland did not progress beyond the first round they secured a historic victory against England. Ireland beat England by 3 wickets with Kevin O'Brien hitting the fastest century in World Cup history, managing the feat in just 50 balls. In passing England's total of 327 for victory, Ireland broke the record for the highest successful run chase in the World Cup.

In the match against England, the opposition batted first with Jonathan Trott top-scoring, with 92 from 92 balls. England batsmen Kevin Pietersen and Ian Bell also hit half-centuries, with Trott and Bell sharing a 177 run partnership. England finished on 327/8 from their 50 overs, having only scored 33 runs from their last 5 overs.
In reply, Ireland lost their captain, William Porterfield in the very first ball, and were struggling at 111/5 after 25 overs. Kevin O'Brien came in with the score at 106/4, and made 100 in just 50 balls, the fastest century in World Cup history. Ireland required only 11 from 11 balls. Ireland won the match by 3 wickets, with five balls to spare; it was the largest successful run chase in Cricket World Cup history.

=== 2015 World Cup ===
Squad

- William Porterfield (c)
- Andrew Balbirnie (vc)
- Peter Chase
- Alex Cusack
- George Dockrell
- Ed Joyce
- John Mooney
- Max Sorensen
- Kevin O'Brien
- Niall O'Brien (wk)
- Paul Stirling
- Stuart Thompson
- Gary Wilson (wk)
- Andy McBrine
- Craig Young

Note: Max Sorensen replaced Tim Murtagh, who pulled out due to injury.

Results

Pool stage (Pool B)							Quarterfinal	Semifinal	Final	Overall Result
Opposition Result	Opposition Result	Opposition Result	Opposition Result	Opposition Result	Opposition Result	Rank	Opposition Result	Opposition Result	Opposition Result	Overall Result
West Indies; W by 4 wickets	United Arab Emirates; W by 2 wickets	South Africa; L by 201 runs	Zimbabwe; W by 5 runs	India; L by 8 wickets	Pakistan; L by 7 wickets	5	Did not advance			Pool stage

Scorecards

Group stage (Group B)

16 February
Scorecard

West Indies; 304/7 (50 overs)	v	Ireland; 307/6 (45.5 overs)
Lendl Simmons 102 (84); George Dockrell 3/50 (10 overs)		Paul Stirling 92 (84); Jerome Taylor 3/71 (8.5 overs)

Ireland won by 4 wickets
Saxton Oval, Nelson
Umpires: Richard Illingworth (Eng) and Bruce Oxenford (Aus)
Player of the match: Paul Stirling (Ire)

- Ireland won the toss and elected to field.

25 February (D/N)
Scorecard

United Arab Emirates; 278/9 (50 overs)	v	Ireland; 279/8 (49.2 overs)
Shaiman Anwar 106 (83); Paul Stirling 2/27 (10 overs)		Gary Wilson 80 (69); Amjad Javed 3/53 (9 overs)

Ireland won by 2 wickets
Brisbane Cricket Ground, Brisbane
Umpires: Michael Gough (Eng) and Nigel Llong (Eng)
Player of the match: Gary Wilson (Ire)

- Ireland won the toss and elected to field.

3 March (D/N)
Scorecard

South Africa; 411/4 (50 overs)	v	Ireland; 210 (45 overs)
Hashim Amla 159 (128); Andrew McBrine 2/63 (10 overs)		Andrew Balbirnie 58 (71); Kyle Abbott 4/21 (8 overs)

South Africa won by 201 runs
Manuka Oval, Canberra
Umpires: Steve Davis (Aus) and Ranmore Martinesz (SL)
Player of the match: Hashim Amla (SA)

- South Africa won the toss and elected to bat.

7 March (D/N)
Scorecard

Ireland; 331/8 (50 overs)	v	Zimbabwe; 326 (49.3 overs)
Ed Joyce 112 (103); Tendai Chatara 3/61 (10 overs)		Brendan Taylor 121 (91); Alex Cusack 4/32 (9.3 overs)

Ireland won by 5 runs
Bellerive Oval, Hobart
Umpires: Ruchira Palliyaguruge (SL) and Paul Reiffel
Player of the match: Ed Joyce (Ire)

- Zimbabwe won the toss and elected to field.

10 March
14:00 (NZDT) (D/N)
Scorecard

Ireland; 259 (49 overs)	v	India; 260/2 (36.5 overs)
Niall O'Brien 75 (75); Mohammed Shami 3/41 (9 overs)		Shikhar Dhawan 100 (85); Stuart Thompson 2/45 (6 overs)

India won by 8 wickets
Seddon Park, Hamilton
Umpires: Kumar Dharmasena (SL) and Richard Kettleborough (Eng)
Player of the match: Shikhar Dhawan (Ind)

- Ireland won the toss and elected to bat.

15 March
14:00 (ACDT) (D/N)
Scorecard

Ireland; 237 (50 overs)	v	Pakistan; 241/3 (46.1 overs)
William Porterfield 107 (131); Wahab Riaz 3/54 (10 overs)		Sarfraz Ahmed 101* (124); Alex Cusack 1/43 (10 overs)

Pakistan won by 7 wickets
Adelaide Oval, Adelaide
Umpires: Marais Erasmus (SA) and Ruchira Palliyaguruge (SL)
Player of the match: Sarfraz Ahmed (Pak)

- Ireland won the toss and elected to bat.
- Ireland were eliminated from the World Cup as a result of this match.

== Records and statistics ==
=== Team records ===
Highest innings totals

Score	Opponent	Venue	Season
331/8 (50 overs)	Zimbabwe	Hobart	2015
329/7 (49.1 overs)	England	Bengaluru	2011
307/6 (45.5 overs)	West Indies	Nelson	2015
307/4 (47.4 overs)	Netherlands	Kolkata	2011
279/8 (49.2 overs)	United Arab Emirates	Brisbane	2015
Last updated: 15 March 2015

=== Most appearances ===
This list consists players with most number of matches at the Cricket World Cup. Niall O'Brien played a total of 21 World Cup matches and William Porterfield has captained the team in the most number of matches(12).

Matches	Player	Period
21	Niall O'Brien	2007-2015
21	William Porterfield	2007-2015
20	Kevin O'Brien	2007-2015
15	Boyd Rankin	2007-2011
14	John Mooney	2007-2015
Last updated: 15 March 2015

=== Batting statistics ===
Most runs

Runs	Player	Mat	Inn	HS	Avg	100s	50s	Period
627	William Porterfield	21	21	107	29.85	1	4	2007–2015
620	Niall O'Brien	21	21	79*	32.63	—N/a	5	2007–2015
499	Kevin O'Brien	20	20	113	27.72	1	1	2007–2015
422	Ed Joyce	12	12	112	35.16	1	2	2011–2015
316	Paul Stirling	12	12	101	26.33	1	1	2011–2015
Last updated: 15 March 2015

Highest partnerships

Runs	Players	Opposition	Venue	Season
177 (1st wicket)	Paul Stirling (99) & William Porterfield (68)	v Netherlands	Kolkata	2011
162 (6th wicket)	Kevin O'Brien (96) & Alex Cusack (47)	v England	Bengaluru	2011
138 (3rd wicket)	Ed Joyce (75) & Andrew Balbirnie (59)	v Zimbabwe	Hobart	2015
113 (3rd wicket)	Niall O'Brien (46) & William Porterfield (54)	v India	Bengaluru	2011
105 (2nd wicket)	Ed Joyce (51) & Paul Stirling (54)	v West Indies	Nelson	2015
Last updated: 15 March 2015

=== Bowling statistics ===
Most wickets

Wickets	Player	Matches	Avg.	Econ.	BBI	4W	5W	Period
16	Trent Johnston	13	31.12	5.31	2/16	0	0	2007–2011
15	Boyd Rankin	15	42.60	5.58	3/32	0	0	2007–2011
14	John Mooney	14	41.42	6.10	4/63	1	0	2007–2015
13	Kevin O'Brien	20	47.92	7.34	4/71	1	0	2007–2015
12	George Dockrell	12	41.25	5.22	3/50	0	0	2011–2015
10	Kyle McCallan	9	23.30	3.97	2/12	0	0	2007–2007
Last updated: 15 March 2015

== See also ==
- Ireland national cricket team
- Cricket in Ireland
