= Irish cricket team in England in 2017 =

International cricket tour

	England	Ireland
- Dates: 5 May – 7 May 2017
Captains	Eoin Morgan	William Porterfield

One Day International series
- Results: England won the 2-match series 2–0
Most runs	Joe Root (122)	William Porterfield (95)
Most wickets	Adil Rashid (6)	Peter Chase (5)

The Ireland cricket team toured England in May 2017 to play two One Day International (ODI) matches. The matches were part of England's preparation for the 2017 ICC Champions Trophy, scheduled to be held in England and Wales the following month. It was the first time that the two teams played each other in England. England won the series 2–0.

== Squads ==
England	Ireland
Eoin Morgan (c); Moeen Ali; Jonny Bairstow; Jake Ball; Sam Billings; Ben Duckett; Steven Finn; Alex Hales; Liam Plunkett; Adil Rashid; Joe Root; Jason Roy; David Willey; Mark Wood	William Porterfield (c); Andrew Balbirnie; Peter Chase; George Dockrell; Ed Joyce; Tim Murtagh; Andy McBrine; Barry McCarthy; Kevin O'Brien; Niall O'Brien; Paul Stirling; Stuart Thompson; Gary Wilson; Craig Young

== ODI series ==
=== 1st ODI ===
5 May 2017
Scorecard

Ireland; 126 (33 overs)	v	England; 127/3 (20 overs)
Andrew Balbirnie 30 (38); Adil Rashid 5/27 (8 overs)		Alex Hales 55 (39); Peter Chase 3/44 (8 overs)

England won by 7 wickets
County Ground, Bristol
Umpires: Aleem Dar (Pak) and Rob Bailey (Eng)
Player of the match: Adil Rashid (Eng)

- Ireland won the toss and elected to bat.
- This was Ireland's first ODI in England.
- Liam Plunkett (Eng) played in his 50th ODI.
- Adil Rashid (Eng) took his maiden five-wicket haul in ODIs.

=== 2nd ODI ===
7 May 2017
Scorecard

England; 328/6 (50 overs)	v	Ireland; 243 (46.1 overs)
Eoin Morgan 76 (79); Barry McCarthy 2/61 (10 overs)		William Porterfield 82 (83); Liam Plunkett 3/22 (8 overs)

England won by 85 runs
Lord's, London
Umpires: Paul Reiffel (Aus) and Tim Robinson (Eng)
Player of the match: Joe Root (Eng)

- Ireland won the toss and elected to field.
