= Brendan O'Brien (cricketer) =

Irish cricketer

Personal information
- Full name: Brendan Anthony O'Brien
- Born: 2 September 1942 (age 84); Galway, County Galway, Ireland
- Nickname: Ginger
- Batting: Right-handed
- Relatives: Niall O'Brien (son); Kevin O'Brien (son)

International information
- National side: Ireland (1966–1981)

Career statistics
Competition	First-class	List A
Matches	11	2
Runs scored	319	2
Batting average	19.93	1.00
100s/50s	0/0	0/0
Top score	45*	1
Catches/stumpings	6/–	1/–
- Source: CricketArchive, 26 January 2011

Brendan Anthony O'Brien (born 2 September 1942) is a former Irish cricketer. O'Brien was a right-handed batsman. He was born at Galway in 1942.

O'Brien made his first-class cricket debut for the Ireland cricket team in 1966 against Scotland. Between 1966 and 1981 he played 11 times for Ireland in first-class matches, the last of which also came against Scotland. He scored 319 runs at a batting average of 19.93, with a highest score of 45 not out. O'Brien also played for Ireland in two List A matches. He played domestically for Railway Union and South Leinster.

O'Brien coached the Ireland women's cricket team at the 1993 Women's Cricket World Cup in England.

== Personal life ==
O'Brien is the father of Niall and Kevin O'Brien, both of whom played One Day International and Twenty20 International cricket for Ireland. Both were key members of Ireland's successful 2007 Cricket World Cup squad when they played important parts in Ireland's upset victory over Pakistan and played county cricket in England. Three other sons played for Railway Union and O'Brien's daughter Ciara played for Ireland at under-19 and under23 levels.
