= Marian College (Dublin) =

- Colaiste Mhuire Cois Abhainn
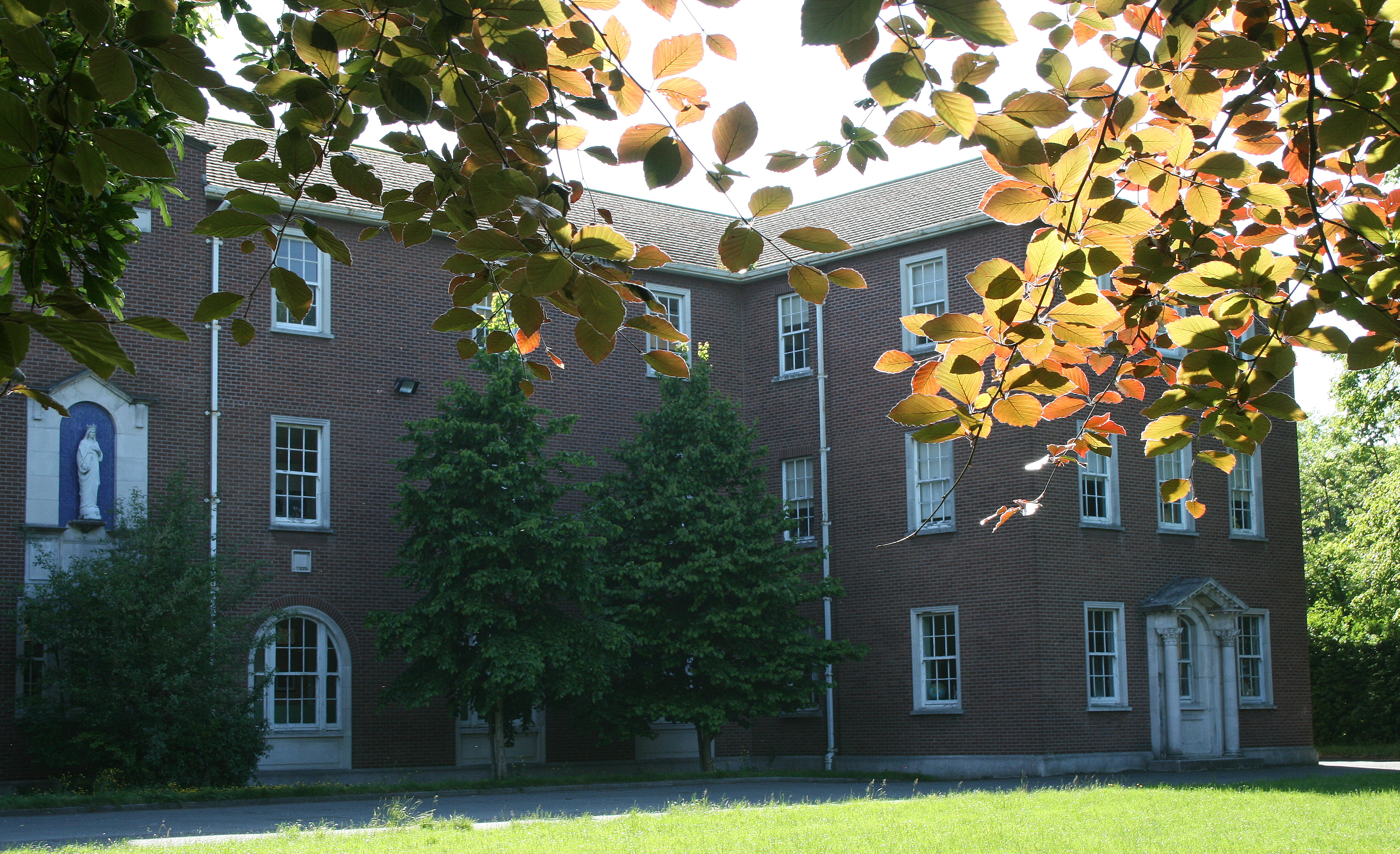

Location
- Lansdowne Road, Ballsbridge; Dublin, D04 W268; Ireland
- Coordinates: 53.332899°N 6.229055°W

Information
- Type: Secondary school
- Motto: Optimum Optare (The pursuit of excellence)
- Established: 1954; 72 years ago
- Principal: Pat Glover, Deputy Principal - Mitch Lindsay
- Staff: 35
- Enrolment: 425
- Colours: Royal Blue, Old Gold
- Affiliation: Marist Order (Brothers)
- Website: www.mariancollege.ie

Marian College is a Marist Catholic secondary school in Ballsbridge, Dublin, Ireland that was established in 1954.

== History ==
In the early 1950s, the then Archbishop of Dublin, Dr John Charles McQuaid, had invited the Marist Brothers to open a school in the Sandymount-Ballsbridge area. This was in response to the opening of a co-educational school, Sandymount High School. Co-education was anathema to Archbishop McQuaid, so he wanted to provide a Catholic option beside it. The Marists found a site at Riverside House on the banks of the River Dodder and on 8 September 1954 the first pupils entered the Brothers’ house to begin their secondary schooling.

Until 1999, Sandymount High School was next door to Marian College.

For the first 34 years, the College was run by a succession of Marist Brothers. In later years, lay involvement in the management and organisation of the College has grown.

== Academics ==
The school was ranked tenth in Ireland in terms of the number of students who progressed to third level and by the types of institutions to which the students progressed.

== Sport ==
Rugby union is one of the school's main sports. The college fields teams in both the JCT/SCT competitions and reached the JCT final of the Cup Shield in 2008. The JCT won the Cup Shield in 1968.

Water-polo is the school's most successful sport, the college having won numerous Leinster titles over the past 10 years.

In 2010 the senior Gaelic team won both the Dublin and Leinster schools championships.

Marian won a Leinster basketball title in 1989-90, coached by Meany and Nesbitt.

The College also won national soccer cup, captained by Graham Kavanagh.

Marian won the bike polo all Ireland championship in 2010.

== Notable alumni ==
- Declan Hughes, author and playwright
- Adrian Kennedy, FM Radio presenter
- Diarmuid Martin, Archbishop of Dublin (2004 - )
- Paul Ryan (Irish Rugby League International)
- Kevin O'Brien and Niall O'Brien, brothers on the Irish international cricket team.
- Noel Pearson, film and theatre producer and impresario
