= Sam Billings =

English cricketer (born 1991)

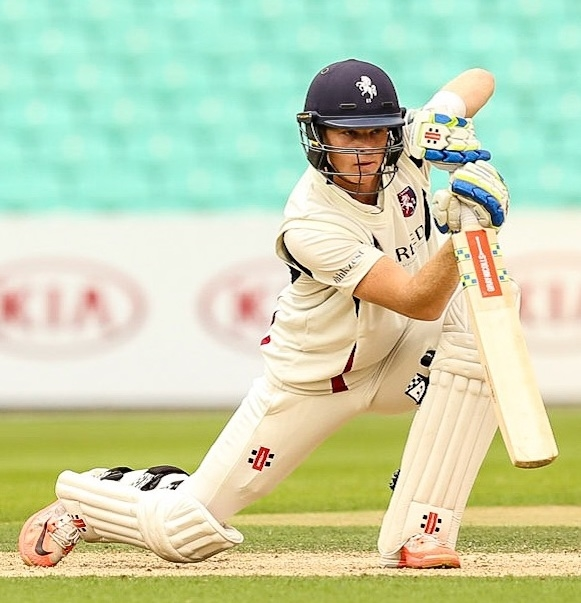
- Billings playing for Kent in 2015

Personal information
- Full name: Samuel William Billings
- Born: 15 June 1991 (age 35); Pembury, Kent, England
- Nickname: Bilbo
- Height: 5 ft 10 in (1.78 m)
- Batting: Right-handed
- Role: Wicket-keeper-batter

International information
- National side: England (2015–2022)
- Test debut (cap 700): 14 January 2022 v Australia
- Last Test: 1 July 2022 v India
- ODI debut (cap 242): 9 June 2015 v New Zealand
- Last ODI: 22 November 2022 v Australia
- ODI shirt no.: 7
- T20I debut (cap 71): 23 June 2015 v New Zealand
- Last T20I: 30 January 2022 v West Indies
- T20I shirt no.: 7

Domestic team information
- Years: Team
- 2011–2012: Loughborough MCCU
- 2011–: Kent
- 2016–2017: Islamabad United
- 2016–2017: Delhi Daredevils
- 2016/17–2017/18: Sydney Sixers
- 2018–2019: Chennai Super Kings
- 2020/21–2021/22: Sydney Thunder
- 2021–2025: Oval Invincibles
- 2022: Kolkata Knight Riders
- 2022/23–2023/24: Brisbane Heat
- 2023: Rangpur Riders
- 2023–2025: Lahore Qalandars
- 2024–2025: Dubai Capitals
- 2024: Antigua and Barbuda Falcons
- 2024/25; 2025/2026: Sydney Thunder
- 2026: Sylhet Titans
- 2026–present: Rawalpindiz

Career statistics
Competition	Test	ODI	FC	LA
Matches	3	28	88	103
Runs scored	66	702	3,628	3,125
Batting average	22.00	33.42	31.27	41.66
100s/50s	0/0	1/5	6/15	7/21
Top score	36	118	171	175
Catches/stumpings	8/0	19/1	219/12	88/9
- Source: ESPNcricinfo, 30 September 2024

Samuel William Billings (born 15 June 1991) is a professional English cricketer. Billings is a right-handed batsman who fields as a wicket-keeper. He was born at Pembury in Kent and has played for Kent County Cricket Club teams since he was eight years old, making his senior debut for the First XI in 2011. In October 2017, he was appointed as the vice-captain of the team, before being appointed as captain in January 2018, replacing Sam Northeast. He served as the club's captain until the end of the 2023 season when he resigned, although he retained the captaincy of the club's Twenty20 cricket team.

Billings has appeared mainly in limited overs formats for the England cricket team and made his Test cricket debut in January 2022. He has played Twenty20 franchise cricket in the Pakistan Super League, Indian Premier League, Bangladesh Premier League and in the Big Bash League in Australia and captained Oval Invincibles in all four seasons of The Hundred.

== Early and personal life ==
Billings was born at Pembury in Kent and grew up on his family's farm in the north of the county. He developed as an all-round sportsman, playing tennis for Kent and being offered a trial for Tottenham Hotspur Football Club after scoring a hat-trick against the team's academy team whilst playing for Corinthian under-14s. He also played racquets, squash, and rugby. His grandfather, Ron Billings, was a racquets champion. His cousin, Tom Billings, has been world champion of the sport. Billings attributes racquets with helping to develop his batting skills, in particular his hand-eye coordination.

Billings attended New Beacon School in Sevenoaks and then Haileybury College in Hertfordshire, appearing regularly for their cricket XI throughout his school career. He studied Sport and Exercise Science at Loughborough University. Billings has said that he was "nowhere near good enough" to become a professional cricketer before his time at university and credits it with encouraging him to work hard to develop his talent.

== Early career ==
Billings made his first-class debut for Loughborough MCCU against Northamptonshire in 2011. He made a further first-class appearance for the team in 2011, against Leicestershire. In his four first-class matches for Loughborough MCCU, he scored 321 runs at an average of 45.85, with a highest score of 131 in his debut match against Northamptonshire.

== Kent career ==
During his time in university, Billings was a member of the Kent Squad. He made his debut for the county in May 2011 in a first-class match against his university team, Loughborough MCCU. During the 2011 season, he made his List A debut for Kent against the Netherlands in the 2011 Clydesdale Bank 40, standing in for regular wicket-keeper Geraint Jones. Billings made three further List A appearances in the 2011 season, as well as playing in four matches in the 2011 Friends Provident t20. After leading the county in one-day runs scored in 2012, Billings succeeded former England wicket-keeper Jones in Kent's 2013 Friends Life t20 campaign. At the end of the season he kept wicket in the County Championship, breaking Jones' string of 115 consecutive Championship appearances for Kent before playing Sydney Grade Cricket for Penrith District Cricket Club during the 2013–14 English winter.

Billings became the first choice wicket-keeper for Kent in the 2014 season. He played in the champion county match in Abu Dhabi at the beginning of the 2015 season before scoring 693 runs at an average of 29.80 in the 2015 County Championship season and making his England One Day and T20 debuts. He was awarded his Kent County Cap in August 2015 during the annual Canterbury Cricket Week. In January 2016, he signed a contract extension with Kent.

After spending the winter playing one-day international cricket with England and featuring in both the Pakistan Super League (PSL) and Indian Premier League (IPL) T20 competitions, Billings returned to Kent at the end of May having missed six County Championship matches as well as the start of both one-day competitions. During the 2016 season he became the second Kent wicket-keeper to take seven catches in an innings and the tenth to claim nine dismissals in a first-class match, both one short of equaling the record for the county, and made his highest score in first-class cricket.

Billings spent the following winter playing for England in Bangladesh, Sydney Sixers in the Big Bash League and for England again in India and the West Indies as well as playing in the PSL and IPL again. England duty again kept him away from Kent for parts of the 2017 season and he played in six of the county's County Championship matches during the season, although he was present during the T20 Blast. He averaged 43.66 in the Championship games he played and captained the team in a tour match against the West Indies in August. At the end of the season he signed a new contract with Kent and was appointed officially as the team's vice-captain.

Following Sam Northeast's removal as Kent captain in early 2018, Billings was appointed to the post as his replacement, despite some disquiet about his participation in the 2018 Indian Premier League. This meant that he missed the first part of the County Championship and One Day Cup seasons. The team was captained by Joe Denly in Billings' absence. Later in the season, Billings once again signed a contract extension.

Billings captained Kent Spitfires to the 2021 T20 Blast title, beating Somerset in the final by 25 runs to win the tournament and their second domestic T20 title.

== International career ==
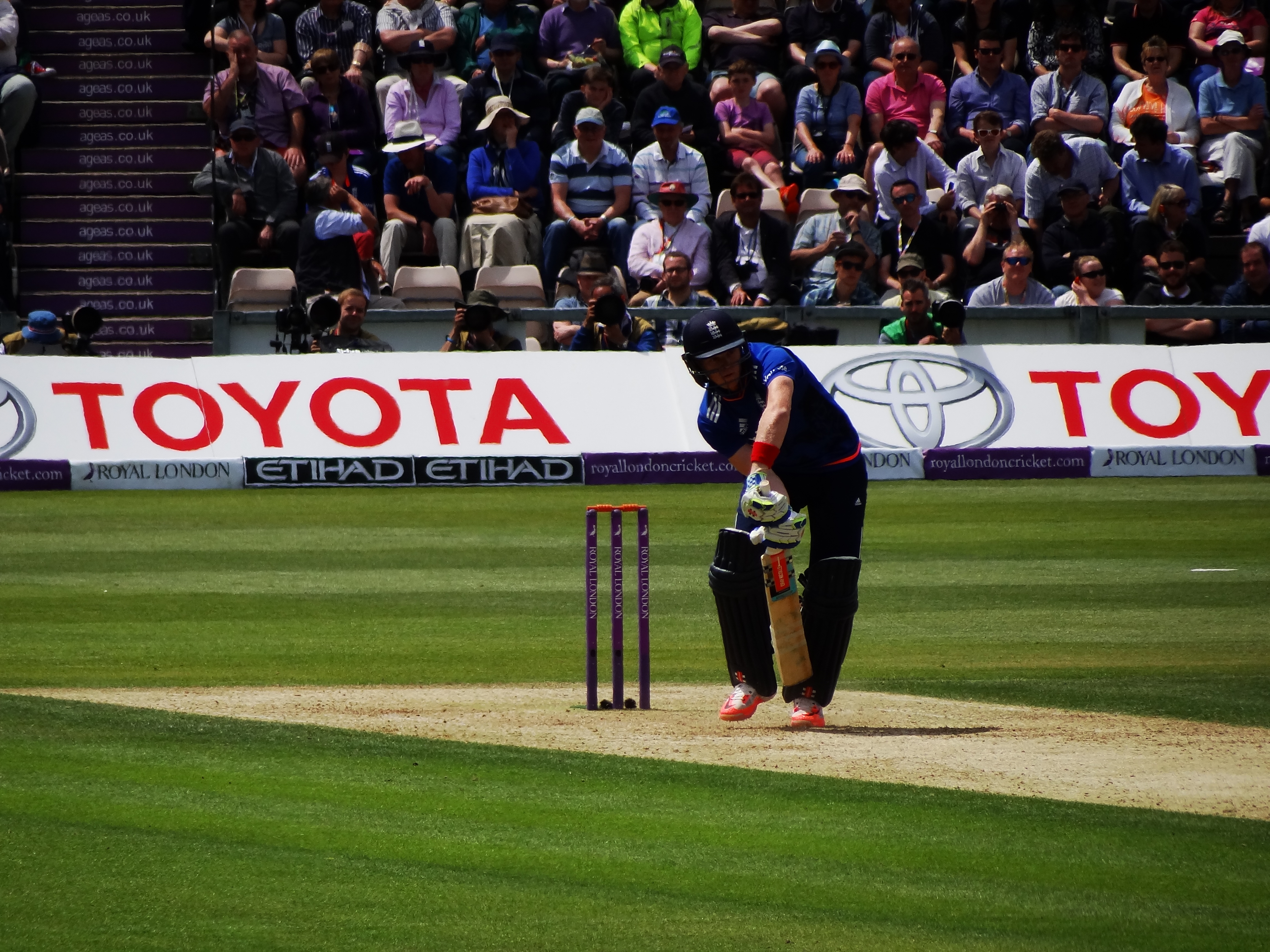
Billings batting for England against New Zealand in 2015.

Billings was first called into the England Performance Programme in 2014 and took part in a training camp in Sri Lanka during the English winter. He had played for an ECB under-16 team in 2006 and for England age group teams at under-17 and under-18 level before touring Bangladesh with the England under-19 team in 2009.

He was named in the squad for the England Lions cricket team in the 2014/15 off-season in South Africa, making his debut and scoring 53 against a Gauteng Invitation XI in January 2015 and going on to play for the Lions in four of the five unofficial one-day international matches on the tour. In late 2014, he had been named in the provisional squad for the England cricket team before the 2015 Cricket World Cup, replacing the injured Craig Kieswetter. He did not feature in the final squad for the tournament.

=== International debut ===
Billings made his senior England international debut in an ODI against the touring New Zealand team in June 2015, playing as a batsman and scoring three runs. After playing in all five ODIs during the series, he made his Twenty20 International (T20I) debut on 23 June 2015, scoring 21 runs. He was an unused member of the ODI squad against Australia later the same summer before playing in the T20I against the Australians at the end of August.

After the New Zealand series, Billings was a regular in England ODI and T20I squads, but played infrequently until March 2017. He made his England debut as a wicketkeeper in the first T20I against Pakistan in Dubai in November 2015. He made his maiden international half-century in the match, reaching his fifty in 24 balls, before being run out for 53 off the last ball of the England innings. He took two catches and completed a stumping during the Pakistan innings as England won by 14 runs. He was adjudged man of the match for his performance during the match.

He played for the Lions against Pakistan A in Dubai in January 2016, against South Africa in 2016, and was selected for the England squad for the 2016 World Twenty20 competition. He made an appearance for England during the competition as a substitute fielder. He was named in a 30-man England Performance Squad for the 2016 domestic season and played for the full England T20 team against Sri Lanka in July 2016 and for the Lions team against Pakistan A and Sri Lanka A, scoring his highest List A cricket score of 175 against Pakistan at Canterbury, before touring Bangladesh with the England One Day International team in October, scoring his maiden ODI half-century with a score of 62 in the final match of the series batting as a replacement opening batsman, to help England to a 2–1 series win.

In early 2017 Billings was part of the England ODI and T20 squad which toured India. He played in the opening List A match of the tour against India A again as a specialist batsman, scoring 93 runs, and in an ODI and T20 match on the tour before playing back to back ODI matches for the first time since his debut series against the West Indies. He was an unused member of the England squad for the 2017 Champions Trophy but played against Ireland, South Africa and West Indies during the summer of 2017. In early 2018 he joined the England squad in Australia for the ODI element of their tour, playing in the 2017–18 Trans-Tasman Tri-Series T20 matches against Australia and New Zealand in February. He was an unused member of the England squad for the ODI series against New Zealand which followed.

In October 2019, Billings was named as the vice-captain and first-choice wicket-keeper in England's T20I squad for their tour of New Zealand. He played in all five T20I matches on the tour and scored 34 runs in his five innings and was not selected for the limited-overs team in South Africa early 2020. In May 2020, he was named in a group of 55 players to begin behind closed doors training ahead of international fixtures starting in England following the COVID-19 pandemic. He was not selected in the Test team to face the West Indies but in July was named in the squad for the ODI series against Ireland After playing in all three matches against Ireland without being dismissed and making scores of 67 and 46, he played in the three T20I matches against the touring Pakistanis. Following the return of more established players for matches at the end of the summer against Australia, Billings played in only the last T20I of the three-match series, but was selected for the opening ODI. He went on to make his first senior international century in the match, scoring 118 runs, before playing in both of the other matches in the series. Wisden named him in their ODI team of 2020, the only member of the England team to be selected.

=== Test cricketer ===
Following an injury to Ben Foakes in May 2021, Billings was added to England's Test squad for the first time ahead of the series against New Zealand. He did not play in either of the matches in the series. In August, he was added to England's Test squad as wicket-keeper cover for the fourth Test against India. In September 2021, Billings was named in England's squad for the 2021 ICC Men's T20 World Cup.

Billings made his Test debut for England in the final Test of the 2021–22 Ashes series. Following injuries to both of the team's wicket-keepers, Jos Buttler and Jonny Bairstow, Billings was added to the team as a replacement, having been playing in the Big Bash League for Sydney Thunder, driving about 500 miles (800 km) from Brisbane as a precaution against COVID-19. He made his debut at the Bellerive Oval in Hobart scoring 29 runs in England's first innings and taking five catches in Australia's second in a debut which was described as composed. After being overlooked for selection for England's ODI series against the Netherlands in June 2022, he was called into the England Test team as a replacement during a match against the touring New Zealanders after Ben Foakes had tested positive for COVID-19 during the match. Billings took Foakes' place as the team's wicket-keeper on the fourth day of the third Test of the series at Headingley. He was retained in the Test squad for the single Test to be played at the start of July against India. This match had been postponed in September 2021 due to an outbreak of COVID-19 in the Indian squad.

After missing out on selection for England's squad for the 2022 T20 World Cup in October 2022, Billings returned to the England ODI team for their series against Australia in November. He was the team's top-scorer in the second ODI of the series, showing "the necessary grit" to build an innings of 77 runs after England had lost early wickets.

== Twenty20 franchise leagues ==
Billings is a regular participant in Twenty20 franchise leagues around the world. He has played for teams in the Pakistan Super League, Australian Big Bash and Indian Premier League and was scheduled to play in the first season of the abortive South African T20 Global League.

In December 2015, Billings was selected by Islamabad United in the 2016 Pakistan Super League draft, the first of three overseas Twenty20 leagues he took part in during 2016. The tournament took place in the United Arab Emirates in February 2016 and was the inaugural season of the competition. Billings played in five matches for Islamabad, scoring 34 runs with a top score of 26, but saw the opportunity to learn from players such as Australian Test wicket-keeper Brad Haddin as "invaluable". He was retained by Islamabad for the 2017 season, playing in the team's first five matches of the tournament before leaving to join the England ODI team in the Caribbean. In 2018 Billings was with England in New Zealand at the start of the tournament and, despite joining Islamabad towards the end of the group stage, did not play a match during the PSL season.

Billings was purchased by Delhi Daredevils in the 2016 Indian Premier League auction in February 2016 for £30,000. He scored 54 runs on his debut for Delhi, helping the team to a victory over Kolkata Knight Riders, before going on to play in four further matches before Delhi were eliminated at the end of the group stage. Despite playing in only five matches in the tournament, Billings again saw the experience as one which would help him "improve as a player". In particular, he cited the influence of Delhi's coach Rahul Dravid and had approached the IPL, which he rated as a "phenomenal experience", with the intention of developing his skills, particularly against spin bowling. He has credited the experience of working with players from around the world as a major factor in the improvement of his game, from the use of different training methods to eating more effectively. Billings was retained by Delhi for the 2017 Indian Premier League with the intention of him playing until 1 May to return to England to play against Ireland and prepare for the 2017 ICC Champions Trophy.

In November 2016 Billings signed to play for Sydney Sixers in the 2016–17 Big Bash League in Australia. He made his debut for the Sixers in the opening match of the tournament, taking two catches as the team beat Sydney Thunder by nine wickets. After appearing in the Sixers first five matches of the tournament, Billings left the team to join the England squad in India at the beginning of January 2017. He batted four times for Sydney, averaging 31.25 runs.

After playing again for Sydney in the Big Bash League in 2017/18, Billings was bought by the Chennai Super Kings in the 2018 IPL auction for £71,000. Although he scored a match-winning 56 runs in Chennai's second match of the tournament, a rather disappointing tournament saw him score 108 runs at an average of 13.60 in 10 matches and he did not play in the final as Chennai won the title.

In 2018 he captained Bengal Tigers in the T10 League played in the United Arab Emirates having been picked second in the competition's draft in July. A break from overseas T20 leagues saw him play more frequently for Kent, before he was signed to play for Sydney Thunder in the 2020/21 Big Bash. In February 2021, he was bought again by Delhi ahead of the 2021 Indian Premier League, missing the start of Kent's season, although he did not play a match for the team during the competition.

During the 2021 home season, Billings captained Oval Invincibles during the 2022 season of The Hundred, the ECB's new franchise competition. The team were eliminated from the competition during the last round of group-stage matches. He was retained by the team for the 2022 season. In February 2022, he was bought by Kolkata Knight Riders ahead of the 2022 Indian Premier League, once more mission the start of Kent's domestic season. He played in eight matches for the team, missing games due to illness, and scored 169 runs during the competition. In August 2022 Billings was selected by Brisbane Heat as the third pick in the first Big Bash league draft ahead of the 2022–23 Big Bash. In November, however, he pulled out of the following IPL season, citing his desire to focus on long-form cricket with Kent and burn-out associated with having spent 18 months playing cricket around the globe. He did take part in the 2023 Pakistan Super League, winning the tournament with Lahore Qalandars, his second PSL title.

== Career best performances ==
As of November 2022, Billings has made six first-class, seven List A centuries, including one in international cricket, and one Twenty20 century. His first senior century was a score of 131 made on his first-class debut for Loughborough MCCU against Northamptonshire at the beginning of the 2011 season. He scored his first first-class century for Kent in July 2015 against Essex at Tunbridge Wells, having been out for 99 earlier in the same month against Surrey. His third first-class century, 171 runs, came against Gloucestershire in August 2016 and is his current highest first-class score. Billings' fourth, fifth and sixth centuries were scored in back-to-back innings in September 2019, including two in the same match against Yorkshire at Headingley, the first time two centuries had been scored by the same player on the ground in a County Championship match.

Billings has scored seven List A cricket centuries and in 2014 shared the Walter Lawrence Trophy for the quickest century in County cricket during the season, scored off 46 balls against Somerset in a 2014 Royal London One-Day Cup match. His highest List A score of 175 was made for England Lions against Sri Lanka A at his home ground of Canterbury during July 2016 whilst his highest Twenty20 score of 106 was made for Kent against Somerset at Canterbury in June 2024.

In September 2020 Billings scored his debut senior international century, making a score of 118 in a One Day International match between England and Australia at Old Trafford cricket ground.

In July 2022 Billings set a new County Championship record of 12 catches in a match as his Kent team beat Warwickshire.

As of 8 June 2024

Best Career Batting Performances
Format	Score	Fixture	Venue	Season
First-class cricket	171	Kent v Gloucestershire	Bristol	2016
List A cricket	175	England Lions v Sri Lanka A	Canterbury	2016
Twenty20 cricket	106	Kent v Somerset	Canterbury	2024

== Support for cricketing causes ==
Billings has been involved in supporting the development of cricket by charitable organisations and globally. He has supported activities organised by the Lord's Taverners and worked with disabilities cricket teams with the charity and with NatWest's Cricket has no boundaries campaign. He is an ambassador for the Taverners and launched a cricket ambassador programme for them in 2016. He has worked with youth cricket teams and in October 2017 visited Rwanda to play in a T20 cricket match to mark the opening of the Rwanda Cricket Stadium. He is a patron of cricket in Rwanda.

Sporting positions
Preceded by Sam Northeast	Kent County Cricket Club captain 2018–2023	Succeeded by Daniel Bell-Drummond
