= English cricket team in the West Indies in 2016–17 =

International cricket tour

	West Indies	England
- Dates: 25 February – 9 March 2017
Captains	Jason Holder	Eoin Morgan

One Day International series
- Results: England won the 3-match series 3–0
Most runs	Jonathan Carter (137)	Joe Root (195)
Most wickets	Ashley Nurse (6)	Liam Plunkett (10)
- Player of the series: Chris Woakes (Eng)

The England cricket team toured the West Indies in February and March 2017 to play three One Day International (ODI) matches. England won the series 3–0 and was the first and only time that England had whitewashed the West Indies in an ODI series in the West Indies.

== Squads ==
West Indies	England
Jason Holder (c); Devendra Bishoo; Carlos Brathwaite; Kraigg Brathwaite; Jonathan Carter; Miguel Cummins; ~~Shane Dowrich~~; Shannon Gabriel; Shai Hope; Alzarri Joseph; Evin Lewis; Jason Mohammed; Ashley Nurse; Kieran Powell; Rovman Powell	Eoin Morgan (c); Moeen Ali; Jonny Bairstow; Jake Ball; Sam Billings; Jos Buttler; Tom Curran; Liam Dawson; Steven Finn; Alex Hales; Liam Plunkett; Adil Rashid; Joe Root; Jason Roy; Ben Stokes; ~~David Willey~~; Chris Woakes

David Willey was ruled out of the tour following an operation on his shoulder, with Steven Finn named as his replacement. Alex Hales was added to England's squad after he recovered from a hand fracture. Ahead of the ODI matches, the West Indies reduced their squad from fifteen players to thirteen, dropping Shane Dowrich and Miguel Cummins. However, Cummins was added back in the West Indies squad for the third ODI as a replacement for Shannon Gabriel, who was ruled out due to a side strain he suffered in the 2nd ODI. Tom Curran was added to England's squad as a back-up for Jake Ball, who suffered a knee injury during the second tour match.

== Tour matches ==
=== List A match: UWI Vice Chancellor's XI v England ===
25 February 2017
Scorecard

England; 379/8 (50 overs)	v	UWI Vice Chancellor's XI; 262 (39.5 overs)
Eoin Morgan 95 (84); Jermaine Levy 4/100 (10 overs)		Chadwick Walton 121 (109); Steven Finn 2/22 (4 overs)

England won by 117 runs
Warner Park, Basseterre, Saint Kitts
Umpires: Gregory Brathwaite (WI) and Nigel Duguid (WI)

- UWI Vice Chancellor's XI won the toss and elected to field.
- Cameron Pennyfeather (UWI Vice Chancellor's XI) made his List A debut.

=== List A match: West Indies Cricket Board President's XI v England ===
27 February 2017
Scorecard

West Indies Cricket Board President's XI; 233 (48 overs)	v	England; 234/8 (48.5 overs)
Jahmar Hamilton 73 (90); Ben Stokes 3/35 (7 overs)		Jonny Bairstow 86 (97); Andre McCarthy 2/4 (2 overs)

England won by 2 wickets
Warner Park, Basseterre, Saint Kitts
Umpires: Gregory Brathwaite (WI) and Nigel Duguid (WI)

- West Indies Cricket Board President's XI won the toss and elected to bat.

== ODI series ==
=== 1st ODI ===
3 March 2017
Scorecard

England; 296/6 (50 overs)	v	West Indies; 251 (47.2 overs)
Eoin Morgan 107 (116); Ashley Nurse 2/57 (10 overs)		Jason Mohammed 72 (91); Liam Plunkett 4/40 (8.2 overs)

England won by 45 runs
Sir Vivian Richards Stadium, North Sound, Antigua
Umpires: Gregory Brathwaite (WI) and Ruchira Palliyaguruge (SL)
Player of the match: Eoin Morgan (Eng)

- West Indies won the toss and elected to field.
- Jason Holder (WI) played in his 50th ODI.
- Eoin Morgan set a new record for the most hundreds by an England captain in ODIs (5).

=== 2nd ODI ===
5 March 2017
Scorecard

West Indies; 225 (47.5 overs)	v	England; 226/6 (48.2 overs)
Jason Mohammed 50 (73); Liam Plunkett 3/32 (7.5 overs)		Joe Root 90* (127); Ashley Nurse 3/34 (10 overs)

England won by 4 wickets
Sir Vivian Richards Stadium, North Sound, Antigua
Umpires: Nigel Duguid (WI) and Chris Gaffaney (NZ)
Player of the match: Joe Root (Eng)

- West Indies won the toss and elected to bat.
- Nigel Duguid (WI) stood in his first ODI as an umpire.
- Steven Finn (Eng) took his 100th wicket in ODIs.

=== 3rd ODI ===
9 March 2017
Scorecard

England; 328 (50 overs)	v	West Indies; 142 (39.2 overs)
Alex Hales 110 (107); Alzarri Joseph 4/76 (10 overs)		Jonathan Carter 46 (77); Chris Woakes 3/16 (8 overs)

England won by 186 runs
Kensington Oval, Bridgetown, Barbados
Umpires: Gregory Brathwaite (WI) and Ruchira Palliyaguruge (SL)
Player of the match: Alex Hales (Eng)

- West Indies won the toss and elected to field.
- This was the West Indies' largest defeat, in terms of runs, at home in an ODI.
