= James Boucher (cricketer) =

Irish cricketer

Personal information
- Full name: James Chrysostom Boucher
- Batting: Right-handed
- Bowling: Right-arm off-break

International information
- National side: Ireland

Career statistics
Competition	First-class
Matches	28
Runs scored	625
Batting average	13.58
100s/50s	0/2
Top score	85
Balls bowled	5,544
Wickets	168
Bowling average	14.04
5 wickets in innings	18
10 wickets in match	5
Best bowling	7/13
Catches/stumpings	23/–
- Source: CricketArchive, 6 December 2022

James Chrysostom Boucher (22 December 1910 – 25 December 1995) was an Irish cricketer. He was a right-handed batsman and off-break bowler.

Boucher was educated at Belvedere College in Dublin. He made his debut for Ireland against a team known as "The Cataramans" in July 1929. He went on to play for them on 60 occasions, his last game coming against Scotland in July 1954. He then served as honorary secretary of the Irish Cricket Union until 1973.

Of his matches for Ireland, 28 had first-class status, and in those games he took 168 wickets at an average of 14.04. His best bowling was 7/13 against New Zealand in September 1937. In all matches for Ireland he took 307 wickets, one of only three Irish bowlers to take more than 300 wickets.
