= Ireland cricket team =

Irish international cricket team

Ireland
- Association: Cricket Ireland

Personnel
- Test captain: Andrew Balbirnie
- One Day captain: Paul Stirling
- T20I captain: Lorcan Tucker
- Coach: Gary Wilson

History
- Test status acquired: 2017

International Cricket Council
- ICC status: Associate Member (1993); Full Member (2017)
- ICC region: Europe
ICC Rankings	Current	Best-ever
Test	10th	10th (28 July 2024)
ODI	13th	10th (23 April 2007)
T20I	11th	8th (31 March 2012)

Tests
- First Test: v. Pakistan at Malahide Cricket Ground, Dublin; 11–15 May 2018
- Last Test: v. New Zealand at Stormont Cricket Ground, Belfast; 27–29 May 2026
Tests	Played	Won/Lost
Total	13	3/10 (0 draws)
This year	1	0/1 (0 draws)

One Day Internationals
- First ODI: v. England at Stormont Cricket Ground, Belfast; 13 June 2006
- Last ODI: v. Namibia at High Performance Oval, Windhoek; 1 November 2026
ODIs	Played	Won/Lost
Total	219	85/115 (3 ties, 16 no results)
This year	9	2/7 (0 ties, 0 no results)
- World Cup appearances: 3 (first in 2007)
- Best result: Super 8 (2007)
- World Cup Qualifier appearances: 7 (first in 1994)
- Best result: Champions (2009)

T20 Internationals
- First T20I: v. Scotland at Stormont Cricket Ground, Belfast; 2 August 2008
- Last T20I: v. India at Stormont Cricket Ground, Belfast; 28 June 2026
T20Is	Played	Won/Lost
Total	190	80/99 (2 ties, 9 no results)
This year	10	7/3 (0 ties, 0 no results)
- T20 World Cup appearances: 9 (first in 2009)
- Best result: Super 8 (2009)
- T20 World Cup Qualifier appearances: 5 (Note: From the 2023 edition onwards, T20 World Cup Qualifier refers to the Regional Final of the ICC Europe region.) (first in 2008)
- Best result: Champions (2008, 2012, 2013)
Test kit
ODI kit
T20I kit
- As of 1 November 2026

The Ireland men's cricket team represents All-Ireland in international cricket. The Irish Cricket Union, operating under the brand Cricket Ireland, is the sport's governing body in Ireland, and they organise the international team. The team have a number of home grounds, including Malahide in County Dublin, Stormont, Belfast, Bready in the north-west and Clontarf in Dublin city. A further ground is planned for the National Sports Campus in Abbotstown, Dublin for 2030. Due to the short season allowed by the Irish climate, and lack of large scale facilities, Ireland also occasionally play 'home matches' in venues in England and further abroad.

Ireland's men participate in all three major forms of the international game, Test, One-Day International (ODI) and Twenty20 International (T20I) matches. They are the 11th Full Member of the International Cricket Council (ICC), and the second Full Member from Europe, having been awarded Test status, along with Afghanistan, on 22 June 2017. Ireland and Afghanistan are the most recently appointed Test-playing nations.

Modern Cricket was introduced to Ireland in the 19th century, though cricket may have partly evolved from earlier Gaelic games invented in Ireland. The first match played by an Ireland team was in 1855. Ireland toured Canada and the United States in the late 19th century, and occasionally hosted matches against touring sides. Ireland's most significant early international rivalry, with the Scotland national cricket team, was established when the teams first played each other in 1888. Ireland's maiden first-class match was played in 1902.

Ireland were elected to Associate membership of the ICC in 1993, but played their first full ODI in 2006 against England in the build-up to the 2007 ICC Cricket World Cup, their first successful qualification. At that tournament, a series of eye-catching results against Full Members, including a draw against Zimbabwe, and wins against Pakistan and Bangladesh confirmed Ireland's ODI status after the competition. Since then, they have gone on to play 214 ODIs, resulting in 83 victories, 112 defeats, 16 no results, and 3 ties. Contracts for players were introduced in 2009, marking the transition to becoming a professional team.

Further success in the shortest format meant the Ireland team also qualified for the 2009, 2010, 2012, 2014, 2016, 2021, 2022, and 2024 (Note: The 2020 T20 World Cup was due to be held in Australia, but due to the COVID-19 pandemic, it was delayed to 2021 and held in India. Australia held the 2022 T20 World Cup.) World Twenty20 competitions, and qualified for the 2026 T20 World Cup by ICC men's T20 world rankings.

Before attaining Test status, Ireland also played first-class international cricket in the ICC Intercontinental Cup, which they have won four times between 2005 and 2013. Due to their successes in the first-class ICC Intercontinental Cup competition, and further high-profile wins at the World Cups of 2011 (against England) and 2015 (against West Indies and Zimbabwe), they were labelled the "leading Associate" and stated their intention to become a full member by 2020. This intention was realised in June 2017, when the ICC unanimously decided to award Ireland and Afghanistan Full Member status, which allows them to participate in Test matches. Ireland's first Test was a home fixture at The Village, Malahide between 11–15 May 2018 against Pakistan, and they have played Tests somewhat sporadically since. Their first test victory was against fellow new boys Afghanistan in Sharjah on 12 March 2024.

Ireland remain the only Test playing nation, where the women's team have played a Test match before the men's team. Ireland was a women's Test nation seventeen years before the men, playing their only Test also against Pakistan.

== History ==
=== Early history ===
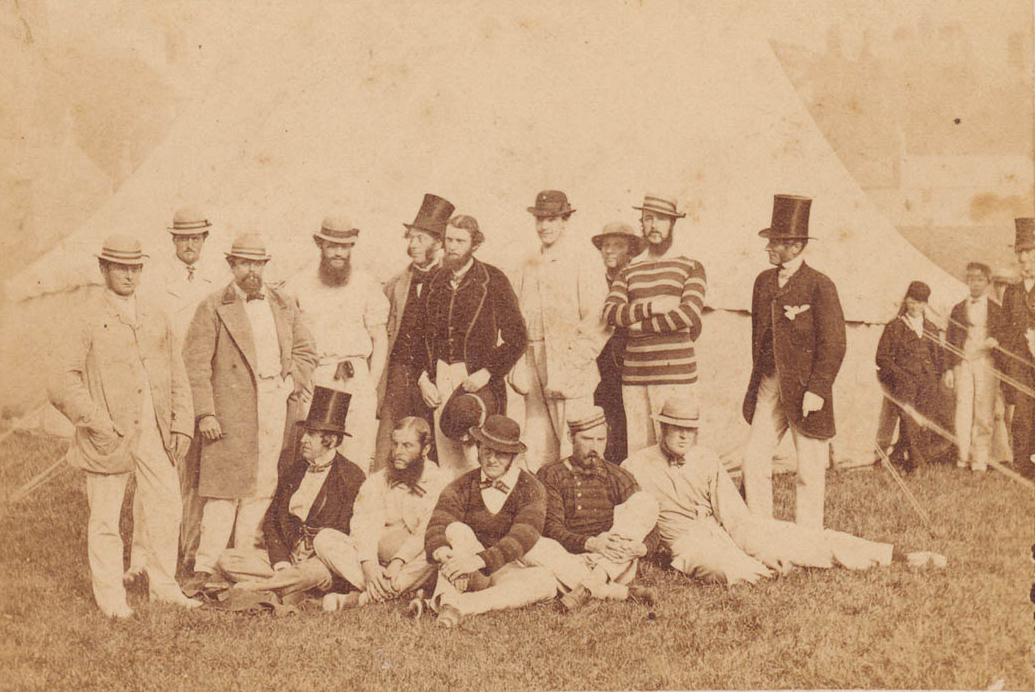
All-Ireland United Cricket team at Phoenix Park, Dublin, ca. 1858

The first mention of modern cricket in Ireland was in 1731 when the Military of Ireland and the Gentlemen of Ireland took each other on in the Phoenix Park, where the game still thrives in one of the world's oldest established cricket clubs. However, the origins of Cricket may, in fact, have come from Ireland, via the ancient Gaelic game of 'Katty', a precursor to the modern game of Rounders in Ireland. Katty was exported around the world by Irishmen serving in the British Army and the game was adopted as both a training and recreational activity by British Army soldiers. The evolution of Katty in the empire is reflected in the use of anglicised Gaelic terms such as crioc, crios, bail, googly, still used in cricket as we know it today.

Modern Cricket was introduced to Ireland by the English in the towns of Kilkenny and Ballinasloe in the early 19th century. In the 1830s, the game began to spread; many of the clubs which were founded in the following 30 years are still in existence today. The first Irish national team played in 1855 against The Gentlemen of England in Dublin. In the 1850s, the Englishman Charles Lawrence was responsible for developing the game in Ireland through his coaching. In the 1850s and 1860s, Ireland was visited for the first time by touring professional teams. Ireland's first match against Marylebone Cricket Club (the M.C.C.) was in 1858.

Cricket had flourished throughout the Ireland until the early 1880s. However, the Irish Land War, the Gaelic Revival cultural movement and its offshoot the Gaelic Athletic Association, founded in 1884, began to challenge the popularity of cricket. There were widespread calls to establish a national cricketing union in Ireland the 1870s to oversee the sport but landlords who owned the estates on which cricket was predominantly played declined to do so, many believing the game would distract their tenant farmers from working and thus impact the estates' income at a time when the land war was already depleting landlords wealth. One of those to call for a formal body to organise cricket was Michael Cusack, later the founder of the GAA. Cusack, was a keen cricketer, later tried to organise cricket under the umbrella of the newly formed Gaelic Athletic Association. His motion, however, lost out narrowly. Consequently, in 1902 cricket fell under the GAA's newly introduced Law 27 banning its members from playing "foreign", in practice, British, games. Until the ban was lifted in 1970, anyone playing foreign games, such as cricket or association football, was banned from the membership of the GAA, the organisation responsible for games such as hurling, Gaelic football, rounders, and Gaelic handball.

Thereafter Cricket in Ireland declined in popularity, especially in the era after the land war as the sport became associated with being a "garrison game" of the British Army. Participation became increasingly restricted to Catholic and Protestant public schools, the Anglo-Irish population, and unionists. Irish teams toured Canada and the US in 1879, 1888, 1892, and 1909. On top of this, Ireland defeated a touring South African side in 1904. Their first match with first-class status was played on 19 May 1902 against a London County side including W.G. Grace. The Irish, captained by Sir Tim O'Brien, won convincingly by 238 runs. An Irish Cricket union was eventually set up in 1923 but some clubs refused to recognise its legitimacy. It was only in 2001 that Cricket Ireland became the official oversight body for cricket in Ireland recognised by all cricket clubs on the island.

=== Before 1993 ===
After the 1902 tour of England, where four matches yielded one win, two draws and one loss, Ireland did not play first-class cricket again for five years. Although the team had lost to the South Africans in 1894 – Ireland's first match against a Test-playing nation – Ireland defeated South Africa in 1904; it was the team's first victory against a Test side. In 1909, the first annual first-class match between Ireland and Scotland was held, and an annual match against the MCC was arranged from 1924 onwards.

The Irish played yearly first-class matches with the Scots, only interrupted by world wars, until 1999, but all their other cricket depended upon touring international sides finding it convenient to include a visit to Ireland in their schedules. However, Ireland sometimes surprised Test nations on these occasions, beating the West Indies by 60 runs in a three-day match in Dublin in 1928, for example; it was Ireland's first match against the West Indies. In 1969, in a match played at Sion Mills in County Tyrone, the team defeated a West Indian side including Clive Lloyd and Clyde Walcott by nine wickets, after bowling them out for 25. This was the last time Ireland defeated a touring side until 2003, when they beat Zimbabwe by ten wickets.

The Scots and the Irish were mostly competing with Sri Lanka for the title as the best non-Test nation at the time – indeed, Ireland drew with Sri Lanka in a rain-hit first-class match in 1979, Ireland scoring a total of 341 for 7 in two innings, while Sri Lanka made 288 for 6 in one innings. Ireland, along with Scotland and the Netherlands, has at times played in competitions for English county cricket sides, including the Benson & Hedges Cup and the Friends Provident Trophy (previously the C&G Trophy). Since there is no nationality restriction in county cricket, non-Irish people were allowed to compete for Ireland in these matches. For example, Hansie Cronje of South Africa played for Ireland in 1997, as did New Zealander Jesse Ryder in 2007.

=== Associate Member (1993–2007) ===
Ireland joined the ICC as an Associate Member in 1993, a year before Scotland. This meant Ireland could play in the ICC Trophy for the first time in 1994, and they finished seventh in the tournament. Three years later they progressed to the semi-finals of the competition but lost the third place play-off with Scotland, thus missing a place at the 1999 cricket World Cup. Ireland finished eighth in the 2001 tournament. After this, Adrian Birrell was hired as coach.

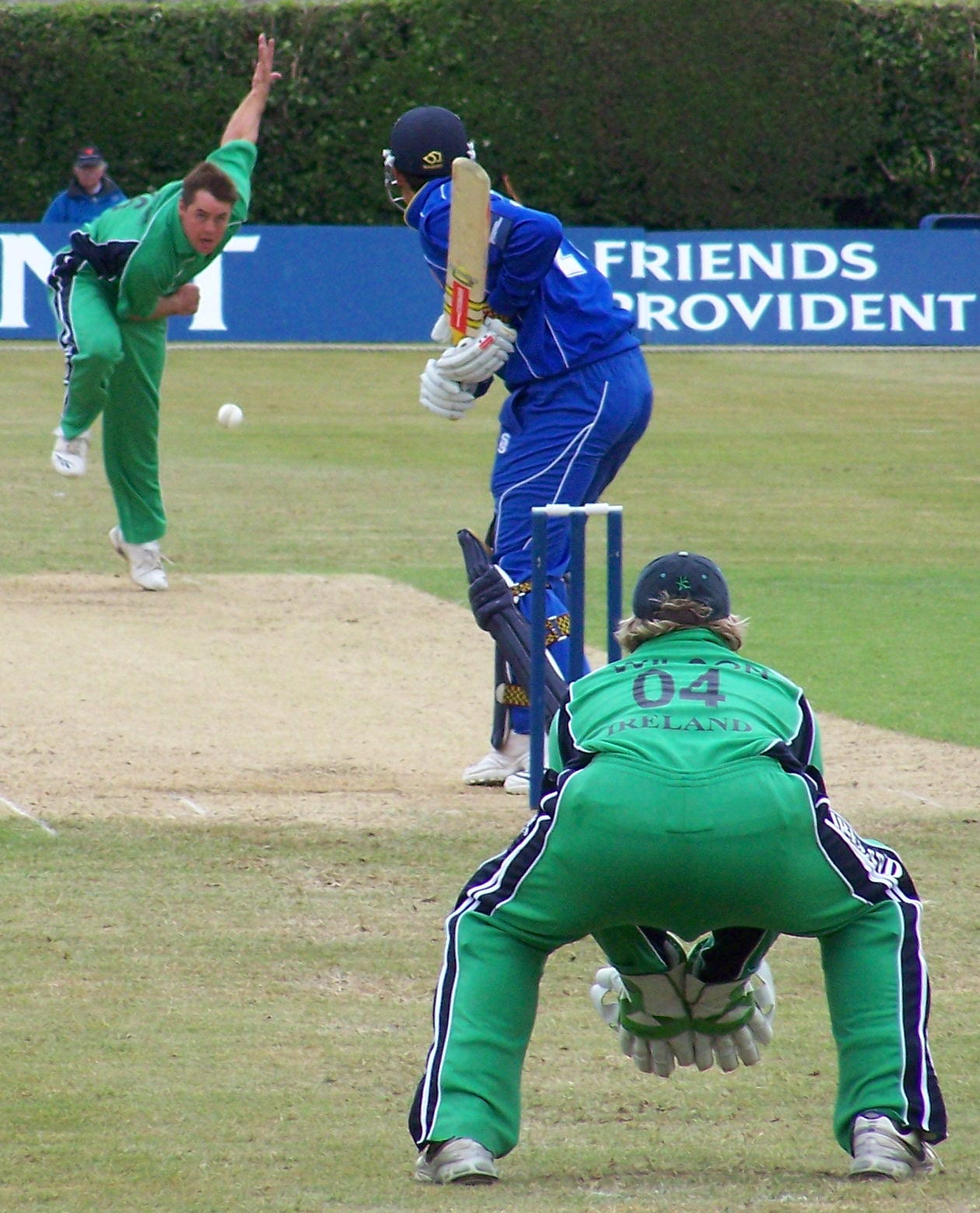
Ireland playing against Essex in the Friends Provident Trophy at Clontarf in 2007.

With the introduction of the ICC Intercontinental Cup in 2004, Ireland had a chance to play first-class on a regular basis. After failing to progress beyond the group stages in the 2004 competition, Ireland won their first Cup title in October 2005 with a six-wicket win over Kenya. The 2005 ICC Trophy, which was hosted in Ireland – the group stages in Belfast, Northern Ireland, the final stages in Dublin, Republic of Ireland – saw the Irish make the final, which they lost to Scotland. Though Ireland were runners-up, they had secured their place at the 2007 World Cup as well as an extra $500,000 over the next four years from the ICC to encourage development of Irish cricket. They also gained official ODI status.

Ireland's inaugural ODI was played in front of a full house of 7,500 spectators at Stormont, Belfast, on 13 June 2006 against England. It was the first time Ireland had played the full England side. Though Ireland lost by 38 runs, they were praised by Andrew Strauss, England's stand-in captain.

13 June 2006

England; 301/7 (50 overs)	v	Ireland; 263/9 (50 overs)
Marcus Trescothick 113 (114); Dave Langford-Smith 3/63 (10 overs)		Andre Botha 52 (89); Steve Harmison 3/58 (10 overs)

England won by 38 runs
Stormont, Belfast
Umpires: Roger Dill (BER) and DB Hair (AUS)
Player of the match: Marcus Trescothick (Eng)

August saw them participate in Division One of the European Championship, against Denmark, Italy, the Netherlands and Scotland. The games against the Netherlands and Scotland had ODI status. In the tournament, and what was the team's second ODI, Ireland recorded their first ODI win, beating fellow Associates Scotland by 85 runs after man-of-the-match Eoin Morgan made 99. Although the match against the Netherlands was a no-result, Ireland won the European Championship title. Ireland's second Intercontinental Cup title came in the 2006–2007 competition. They faced Canada in the final and won by an innings and 115 runs, the four-day match concluding within two days. This made Ireland the first team to successfully defend the Continental Cup.

For the 2006 season, the C&G Trophy was reorganised to include a round-robin stage instead of being entirely knock-out. Whereas Ireland had only one match guaranteed in the tournament before, they now had more fixtures against English county sides. Ireland recorded one win in their nine matches. Ireland participated in the competition until it was restructured again in 2009. In that time they played 25 matches and won two. The latter of those victories was against Worcestershire; in that match Ireland bowled Worcestershire out for 58, which was their lowest ever one-day total. It was the first time that Ireland had bowled out a county for less than 100. Ireland were invited to participate in the reformatted competition from 2010 onwards, but chose not to do so, and instead focused their limited financial resources on international cricket.

=== One-Day International status without Test status (2007–2016) ===
At the start of 2007, Ireland saw more than three months of almost constant cricket. First was a visit to Kenya, where they took part in Division One of the ICC World Cricket League. They finished fifth in the league after four narrow defeats, and Kenya won the league. Before the World Cup, the team participated in a high-performance camp in South Africa. Ireland's performance in their inaugural World Cup in the 2007 Cricket World Cup took many pundits by surprise. In their first game, on 15 March, they tied with Zimbabwe, primarily thanks to Ireland's first ever World Cup century by man-of-the-match Jeremy Bray and economical bowling in the final overs by Trent Johnston and Andre Botha. In their second match, played on Saint Patrick's Day, they beat the fourth-ranked team in the world, Pakistan, by three wickets, thus knocking Pakistan out of the competition.

17 March 2007

Pakistan; 132 (45.4 overs)	v	Ireland; 133/7 (41.4 overs)
Kamran Akmal 27 (47); Boyd Rankin 3/32 (9 overs)		Niall O'Brien 72 (107); Mohammad Sami 3/29 (10 overs)

Ireland won by 3 wickets (D/L method)
Sabina Park, Kingston, Jamaica
Umpires: Billy Bowden (NZ) and Brian Jerling (SA)
Player of the match: Niall O'Brien (Ire)

- Rain and bad light reduced Ireland's target to 128 from 47 overs.

These two results were enough to advance Ireland to the Super-8 stage of the tournament. In their final group-stage game, the West Indies beat them by eight wickets. In the Super 8 stage, they lost their matches against England, South Africa, New Zealand, Australia, and Sri Lanka, but recorded a 74-run victory against Test-playing nation Bangladesh, the 9th-ranked team in the world. The team received a heroes' welcome in Dublin.

After the World Cup, former West Indies cricketer Phil Simmons took over the role of coach from Birrell. India were scheduled to play South Africa in a series of One Day Internationals in Ireland in June 2007. Ireland also played one-off matches at Stormont against the two teams. Missing several players from their World Cup squad, Ireland lost both games. Ireland hosted a quadrangular tournament in Dublin and Belfast in July involving the West Indies, the Netherlands, and Scotland. Ireland and the West Indies both won their games against Scotland and the Netherlands with their direct encounter ending in no result due to rain. The West Indies won the tournament because of a bonus point won against the Netherlands. Trent Johnston stepped down as captain and was replaced by William Porterfield in March 2008.

The 2007–08 ICC Intercontinental Cup began in June, with Ireland playing their first match in August. In November 2008, the team's campaign ended. After finishing second in the round-robin stage of the competition, Ireland faced Namibia in the final. Ireland won by nine wickets, securing their third consecutive Intercontinental Cup title. In March 2008 Ireland toured Bangladesh, playing three ODIs against the hosts and losing all of them. In July, Ireland played a tri-series against New Zealand and Scotland in Aberdeen but lost both matches.

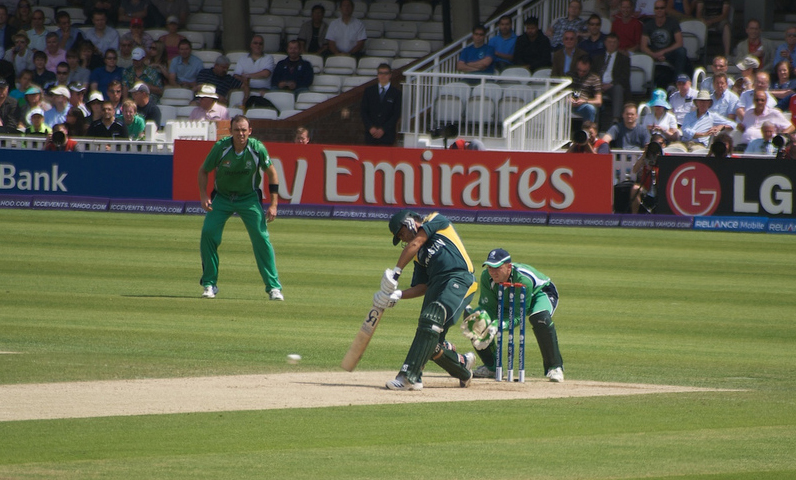
Ireland playing against Pakistan at the Kennington Oval during the 2009 T20 World Cup. Niall O'Brien is keeping wicket whilst and Trent Johnston is the fielder.

Reigning champions Ireland hosted the European Cricket Championship (Division One) in late July and they won their third European title, winning every match, including the decisive encounter against Scotland by seven wickets. In early August, Ireland hosted five other Associate nations at the 2009 ICC World Twenty20 Qualifier in Belfast; this was Ireland's Twenty20 International debut. Ireland would have faced the Netherlands in the final, however the match was rained off and the teams shared the trophy. By getting to the final of the tournament, Ireland qualified for the 2009 ICC World Twenty20 in England in June 2009. Later in August, Ireland were due to play three ODIs at home against Kenya. Ireland won the first game, the second game could not be finished due to rain and the last match was completely washed out. In October, the team visited Kenya for a tri-series of ODIs with the hosts and Zimbabwe. Only two of Ireland's four games in the round-robin stage could be played, the others were rained off. Ireland lost their first match to Zimbabwe, but won their second against Kenya, though they failed to qualify for the final.

In the run-up to the 2009 ICC World Twenty20, Ireland were deprived of batsman Eoin Morgan, similarly to Ed Joyce several years earlier, who was selected to play for England, making him ineligible to play for Ireland again. Ireland played their first Twenty20 International against a full ICC member side on 8 June 2009 and in their opening match of the tournament defeated Bangladesh by four wickets and knocked them out of the tournament. Ireland progressed to the second stage of the competition. They were grouped with New Zealand, Pakistan and Sri Lanka and lost all three of their matches. In 2009, Ireland played nine ODIs, winning the seven they played against Associate nations, losing their only match against a Test team (England), and one match was abandoned.

Ireland played 17 One Day Internationals in 2010, winning 11 (including a victory over Bangladesh) and losing six. Ireland were knocked out of the 2010 ICC World Twenty20, hosted by South Africa in April and May, after being beaten by the West Indies and a washed out match against England.

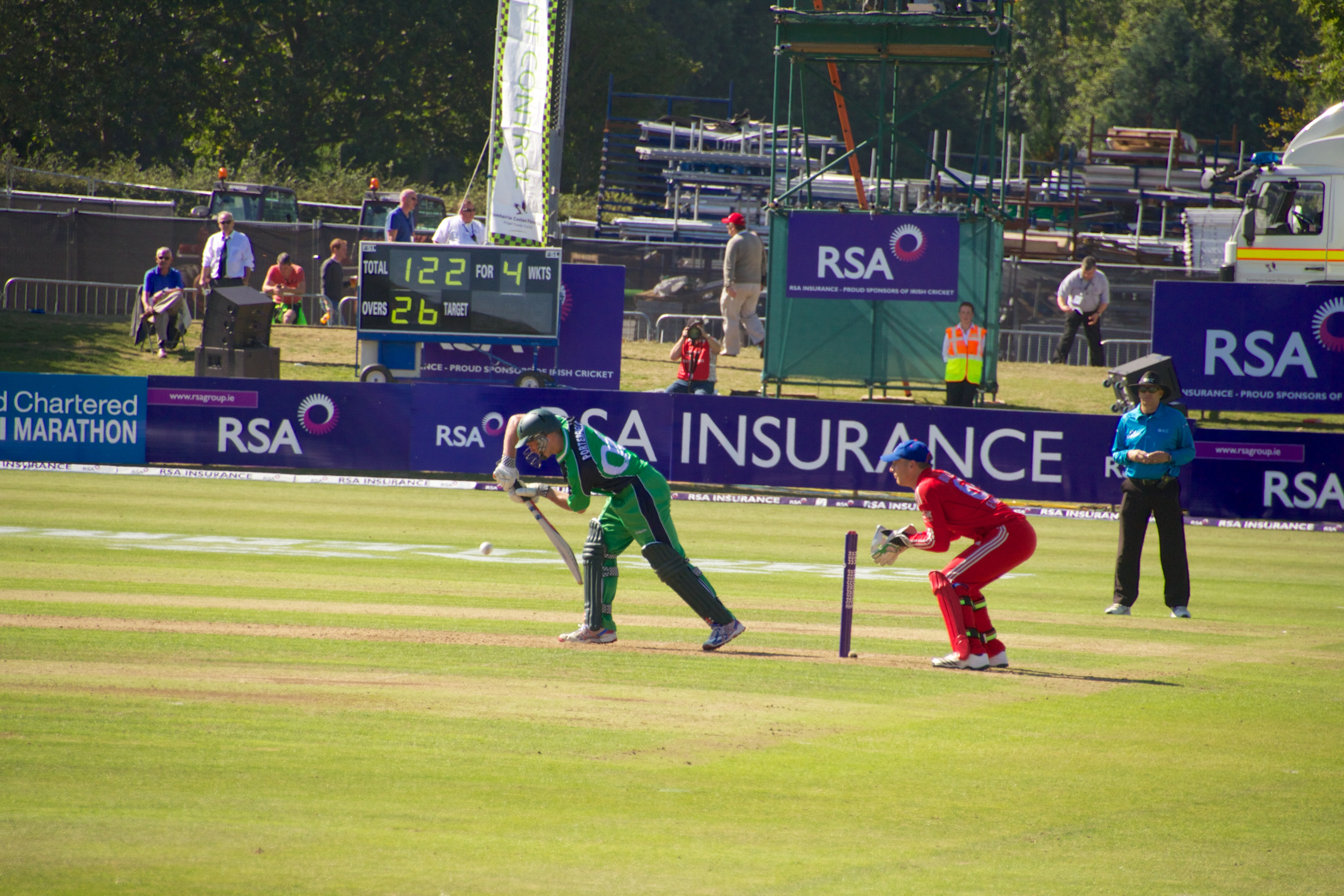
Captain William Porterfield batting against England during Malahide Cricket Club Ground's inaugural ODI in 2013.

The 2011 Cricket World Cup was held between February and March and hosted by Bangladesh, India and Sri Lanka. Though Ireland did not progress beyond the first round they secured a historic victory against England. Ireland beat England by 3 wickets with Kevin O'Brien hitting the fastest century in World Cup history, managing the feat in just 50 balls. In passing England's total of 327 for victory, Ireland broke the record for the highest successful run chase in the World Cup.

2 March 2011

England; 327/8 (50 overs)	v	Ireland; 329/7 (49.1 overs)
Jonathan Trott 92 (92); Trent Johnston 2/58 (10 overs)		Kevin O'Brien 113 (63); Graeme Swann 3/47 (10 overs)

Ireland won by 3 wickets
M Chinnaswamy Stadium, Bangalore
Umpires: Aleem Dar (Pak) and Billy Bowden (NZ)
Player of the match: Kevin O'Brien (Ire)

Shortly after the tournament ended, the ICC announced that the World Cups in 2015 and 2019 would contain ten teams; the Associate countries, who were most likely to miss out in a tournament with fewer teams strongly objected, and, led by Ireland, urged the ICC to reconsider. In June the decision was reversed. After the World Cup Ireland played Pakistan, England, and Scotland in ODIs but lost each match. A further ODI against Sri Lanka was rained off. In all, Ireland played 12 ODIs in 2011, winning four.

Ireland qualified for the 2015 Cricket World Cup, and were promoted to the ICC ODI Championship, leaving the World Cricket League, but not the ICC Intercontinental Cup. In their first match of the World Cup, Ireland defeated the West Indies by 4 wickets, chasing down 304 runs with 25 balls to spare.

16 February 2015

West Indies; 304/7 (50 overs)	v	Ireland; 307/6 (45.5 overs)
Lendl Simmons 102 (84); George Dockrell 3/50 (10 overs)		Paul Stirling 92 (84); Jerome Taylor 3/71 (8.5 overs)

Ireland won by 4 wickets
Saxton Oval, Nelson
Umpires: Richard Illingworth (Eng) and Bruce Oxenford (Aus)
Player of the match: Paul Stirling (Ire)

In their second match they beat the United Arab Emirates by two wickets with four balls to spare; the target was 279. Out of only five successful World Cup chases of 300 runs or more, Ireland have provided three.

In July 2016, Ireland played in its first five-match ODI series against Afghanistan which ended 2–2 with the first ODI being washed out. In September, Ireland toured South Africa for a one match ODI series against Australia and the hosts but lost both games. At the ICC's board meeting in October, Ireland was awarded first-class status for its domestic competition, the Inter-Provincial Championship.

In May 2017, Ireland travelled to England to play a two-match ODI series for the first time, though they ended up losing both games.

=== Test status (2017–present) ===
In January 2012 Cricket Ireland chief executive Warren Deutrom publicly declared Ireland's ambition to play Test cricket by 2020. Their desire to achieve Test status was in part to stem the tide of Irish players using residency rules to switch to England for the opportunity to play Test cricket. Deutrom outlined the ambition as he unveiled the new strategic plan for Irish cricket to 2015. The plan set out a series of stretching goals including increasing the number of participants in the game to 50,000, setting a target of reaching 8th in the World rankings, establishing a domestic first-class cricket structure, and reinforcing cricket as the fifth most popular team sport in Ireland.

Deutrom had already sent a letter to the ICC in 2009 stating his board's intention to apply for Full Membership – a potential pathway to Test cricket – and to seek clarification on the process. Former Australian bowler Jason Gillespie said that if Ireland got Test status it "would be huge news in world cricket, and it would be a massive positive story for the world game". Following Ireland's victory over the West Indies in the 2015 Cricket World Cup, former fast bowler Michael Holding said that the International Cricket Council should grant Ireland Test status immediately, saying "they need to be recognised now". The ICC said in 2015 that Ireland would be granted Test status in 2019 should they win the 2015–17 ICC Intercontinental Cup and beat the 10th ranked Test nation in a four-match Test series in 2018.

However, on 22 June 2017, after more than a decade of playing top-class international cricket, full ICC membership was granted to Ireland (along with Afghanistan) at an ICC meeting in London, thus making them the eleventh Test cricket team. In October 2017, the ICC announced that Ireland's first Test match would be at home against Pakistan in May 2018. Ireland played their first 'touring' Test in India in March 2019 against fellow newcomers Afghanistan, where they lost by 7 wickets. This was followed by a four-day Test match against England at Lord's in July 2019. According to the ICC Future Tours Programme for 2019–23, Ireland are scheduled to play sixteen Tests, but along with Afghanistan and Zimbabwe, are not included in the first two editions of the ICC World Test Championship.

11–15 May 2018 (Note: Although the match was set to begin on 11 May, the first day was lost due to rain and play began on 12 May.)
Scorecard

Pakistan	v	Ireland
310/9d (96 overs); Faheem Ashraf 83 (115); Tim Murtagh 4/45 (25 overs)		130 (47.2 overs); Kevin O'Brien 40 (68); Mohammad Abbas 4/44 (11 overs)
160/5 (45 overs); Imam-ul-Haq 74* (121); Tim Murtagh 2/55 (16 overs)		339 (129.3 overs) (f/o); Kevin O'Brien 118 (217); Mohammad Abbas 5/66 (28.3 overs)

Pakistan won by 5 wickets
The Village, Malahide
Umpires: Richard Illingworth (Eng) and Nigel Llong (Eng)
Player of the match: Kevin O'Brien (Ire)

- Ireland won the toss and elected to field.

Ireland played England in a four-day Test match at Lord's in July 2019. Even though they bowled England out for 85 before lunch on the first day, they were themselves all out for 38 in the final innings, losing the match by 143 runs.

In October 2019, Andrew Balbirnie was appointed Test and ODI captain and one month later, in November he also took over the captaincy of T20I from Gary Wilson, thus becoming all format captain for Ireland.

On 16 January 2022, Ireland claimed their first away ODI series win over a fellow Test nation by beating the West Indies by two wickets at Sabina Park in Jamaica. On 31 March 2023, Ireland claimed their first win against Bangladesh on Bangladeshi soil in the third match of their T20 three match series. Ireland achieved their first-ever series win in Zimbabwe, after winning a three-match series 2–1 in December 2023. The following week they followed up their T20 success with a 2–0 one-day international series victory, which was their first ODI series win in Zimbabwe.

Ireland won their first Test on 1 March 2024 (after losing their first seven), defeating Afghanistan in Abu Dhabi by six wickets.

28 Feb – 01 March 2024 (Note: While four days of play were scheduled for the one-off Test, the match reached a result in three days.)

Afghanistan	v	Ireland
155 (54.5 overs); Ibrahim Zadran 53 (83); Mark Adair 5/39 (16.5 overs)		263 (83.4 overs); Paul Stirling 52 (89); Zia-ur-Rehman 5/64 (30 overs)
218 (75.4 overs); Hashmatullah Shahidi 55 (107); Craig Young 3/24 (10.4 overs)		111/4 (31.3 overs); Andy Balbirnie 58* (96); Naveed Zadran 2/31 (9.3 overs)

Ireland won by 6 wickets
Tolerance Oval, Abu Dhabi
Umpires: Adrian Holdstock (SAF) and Richard Kettleborough (ENG)
Player of the match: Mark Adair (IRE)

- Afghanistan won the toss and elected to bat

A couple months after their first Test victory, Ireland secured their first T20 victory over Pakistan in two attempts, winning by five wickets with one ball remaining. In July 2024 Ireland beat Zimbabwe by four wickets at Stormont and recorded a second consecutive Test victory and a first on home soil. In September 2024 Ross Adair's maiden century powered Ireland to their first T20 win over South Africa to share the series 1–1. Ireland followed this up with a 69-run victory over South Africa in the final match of their ODI series, their second ever victory over South Africa in the ODI format. In May 2025 Ireland beat the West Indies by 124 runs in the first ODI in Dublin marking, its biggest win by runs against a Full Member and their fourth-biggest victory overall. In June 2026 Ireland achieved a historic first victory and two-match sweep over the reigning World T20 champions India. In doing so Ireland broke India's unbeaten run which spanned 16 series and nearly three years.

== International grounds ==
Locations of all stadiums which have hosted an international cricket match within Ireland

Ground	Location	Provincial team	Capacity	First Used	Test	ODI	T20I
Clontarf Cricket Club Ground (Castle Avenue)	Dublin	Leinster Lightning	3,200	1999	—	25	1
Civil Service Cricket Club Ground (Stormont)	Belfast	Northern Knights	7,000	2006	1	31	17
Malahide Cricket Club Ground (The Village)	Malahide	Leinster Lightning	11,500	2013	1	16	13
Bready Cricket Club Ground	Magheramason	North West Warriors	3,000	2015	—	1	9

== Governing body ==
Flag of the Irish team

The Irish Cricket Union (ICU) – the governing body of Irish cricket – was officially founded in 1923, although its predecessor had been active since 1890.

In common with a number of other Ireland sporting governing bodies, the Union was formed to represent cricket throughout the island of Ireland, rather than just the Republic of Ireland. In common with its counterparts for rugby union, rugby league and field hockey, the Union therefore does not use the Irish tricolor, but instead employs its own flag, which is used by such bodies as the International Cricket Council to represent the team and in ICC tournaments; "Ireland's Call" is used as the national anthem.

After the World Cup, Irish cricket had poor results in the 2007 Friends Provident Trophy, as many players were unavailable. The Irish cricket team was an amateur side and most of the players had full-time jobs with commitments conflicting with cricket.

Warren Deutrom, the chief executive of the ICU, has stated that it wants to "seek actively to place Irish players into top-level cricket, by developing relationships with [especially] county cricket which will incorporate appropriate player release for Irish international duty, and feeder systems for developing Irish cricketers". The reorganised ICU sought closer links with the English county teams, to encourage the development of age group cricket, and to introduce a professional element into the Irish game. They also want to take the Ireland cricket team on winter tours more often.

In an attempt to prevent the game losing players to counties or other commitments such as jobs, it was suggested that central contracts should be introduced. This was done in June 2009, with the first two going to Trent Johnston and Alex Cusack. The number of full-time contracts was expanded to six in January 2010 with support for a further nine players; the contracts were split into three categories. In January 2012 the number of contracts was increased to 23, and coach Phil Simmons highlighted the process of becoming professional as an important factor in the team's success.

== Team colours ==
In Test matches, Ireland wears cricket whites, with the optional sweater or vest with a green v-neck with the Cricket Ireland logo on the centre. The shirts feature the Cricket Ireland logo on the right breast, the manufacturer logo on the sleeve and the sponsor logo on the left breast. The fielders wear a navy blue cricket cap or a white sunhat with the Cricket Ireland logo. The batsman helmets are coloured similarly. In limited-overs cricket, Ireland wears an emerald green (in ODI) or lawn green (in T20) uniform with dark blue and white accents and feature the Cricket Ireland logo on the right breast, the sponsor logo on the centre and the manufacturer logo on the left breast. The fielders wear a dark blue baseball-style cap or sunhat.

Dark blue, sometimes referred to as 'presidential blue', taken from both the Irish Presidential seal and the Irish quarter of the British Royal coat of arms, is historically considered a secondary national colour of Ireland, and frequently appears along with green on the kit of all-island teams e.g. hockey and rugby union.

In ICC-regulated tournaments, the sponsor logo goes to the non-leading arm sleeve, making space for the inscription "IRELAND" written in white, on the centre section of the shirt. The current kit supplier is Macron, who signed a four-year deal in April 2023.

== Tournament history ==
=== Cricket World Cup ===
World Cup record
Year	Round	Position	GP	W	L	T	NR
(England) 1975	Not eligible						
(England) 1979	Not eligible						
(England) (Wales) 1983	Not eligible						
(India) (Pakistan) 1987	Not eligible						
(Australia) (New Zealand) 1992	Not eligible						
(India) (Pakistan) (Sri Lanka) 1996	Did not qualify						
(England) (Wales) (Scotland) (Republic of Ireland) (Netherlands) 1999	Did not qualify						
(South Africa) (Zimbabwe) (Kenya) 2003	Did not qualify						
(Cricket West Indies) 2007	Super 8	8/16	9	2	6	1	0
(India) (Sri Lanka) (Bangladesh) 2011	Group Stage	11/14	6	2	4	0	0
(Australia) (New Zealand) 2015	Group Stage	9/14	6	3	3	0	0
(England) (Wales) 2019	Did not qualify						
(India) 2023	Did not qualify						
(South Africa) (Zimbabwe) (Namibia) 2027	TBD						
(India) (Bangladesh) 2031	TBD						
Total	Super 8	8th	21	7	13	1	0

=== T20 World Cup ===
T20 World Cup record
Year	Round	Position	GP	W	L	T	NR
(South Africa) 2007	Did not qualify						
(England) 2009	Super 8	8/12	5	1	4	0	0
(Cricket West Indies) 2010	Group stage	9/12	2	0	1	0	1
(Sri Lanka) 2012	Group stage	9/12	2	0	1	0	1
(Bangladesh) 2014	Group stage	13/16	3	2	1	0	0
(India) 2016	Group stage	15/16	3	0	2	0	1
(United Arab Emirates) (Oman) 2021	Group stage	14/16	3	1	2	0	0
(Australia) 2022	Super 12	10/16	8	3	4	0	1
(Cricket West Indies) (United States) 2024	Group stage	18/20	4	0	3	0	1
(India) (Sri Lanka) 2026	Group stage	13/20	4	1	2	0	1
(Australia) (New Zealand) 2028	Qualified						
(England) (Wales) (Scotland) (Republic of Ireland) 2030	Qualified as co-hosts						
Total	Super 8	8th	33	8	19	0	5

=== Summer Olympics ===
Olympic Games record
Year	Round	Position	GP	W	L	T	NR	Win %
(Greece) 1896	No tournament							
(France) 1900	Did not compete (Note: A Great Britain competed but with a team from Devon and Somerset with no connection to Ireland)							
1904–2024	No tournament							
(United States) 2028	TBA							
(Australia) 2032	TBA							

=== European Annual Tri-Series (T20I) ===
Result summary
Year	Position	GP	W	L	T	NR
(Netherlands) 2018	3/3	4	1	2	1	0
(Republic of Ireland) 2019	1/3	4	2	1	0	1
Total		8	3	3	1	1

=== Other tournaments ===
ICC Trophy / World Cup Qualifier (One day, List A from 2005)	Intercontinental Cup (FC)	ICC World Twenty20 Qualifier (T20I/Twenty20)	T20 World Cup Europe Regional Final
1979–1990 inclusive: Ineligible (not an ICC member); 1994: Second round; 1997: 4th place; 2001: 7th place; 2005: 2nd place (qualified); 2009: Won (qualified); 2014: Pre-qualified through ICC WCL Championship; 2018: 5th place; 2023: 7th place	2004: First round; 2005: Won; 2006–07: Won; 2007–08: Won; 2009–10: 4th; 2011–13: Won; 2015–17: 2nd	2009: Won (qualified); 2010: 2nd place (qualified); 2012: Won (qualified); 2013: Won (qualified); 2015: 3rd place (qualified); 2019: 3rd place (qualified); 2022: 2nd place (qualified)	2023: 2nd place (qualified)

ICC 6 Nations Challenge/ World Cricket League (ODI)	European Championship (OD/ODI) ‡	Triple Crown (Tournament defunct)
2000: 3rd place; 2002: Did not participate; 2004: Did not participate; 2007: 5th place (Division One); 2010: Won (Division One); 2011–13: Won (ICC WCL Championship)	1996: Won; 1998: 4th place (Division One); 2000: 4th place (Division One); 2002: 3rd place (Division One); 2004: 2nd place (Division One); 2006: Won (Division One); 2008: Won (Division One); 2010: 2nd place (Division One) as Ireland A	1993: 2nd place; 1994: 3rd place; 1995: 3rd place; 1996: Won; 1997: 3rd place; 1998: 3rd place; 1999: 4th place; 2000: 2nd place; 2001: 4th place

‡ Only the matches between Scotland, Ireland and the Netherlands in the 2006 tournament have official ODI status.

== Current squad ==
This lists all the active players who have played for Ireland in the year since 4 October 2025 and the forms in which they have played, or any players (in italics) outside this criterion who have been selected in the team's most recent squad. In addition, it includes all players contracted by Cricket Ireland in March 2026.

Key

- S/N = Shirt number
- Con = Contract type (Full-time / Retainer / Educational)

Name	Age	Batting style	Bowling style	Domestic team	Con	Forms	S/N	Captaincy	Last Test	Last ODI	Last T20I
Batters
Ross Adair	32	Right-handed	Slow left-arm orthodox	Northern Knights	F/T	T20I	15		—	—	(India) 2026
Andrew Balbirnie	35	Right-handed	Right-arm off-break	North West Warriors	F/T	Test, ODI	63	Test (C)	(New Zealand) 2026	(Afghanistan) 2026	(Pakistan) 2024
Cade Carmichael	24	Right-handed	Right-arm medium	Northern Knights	F/T	Test, ODI	8		(New Zealand) 2026	(Afghanistan) 2026	—
Paul Stirling	36	Right-handed	Right-arm off-break	Northern Knights	F/T	Test, ODI, T20I	1	ODI (C) & Test (VC)	(Bangladesh) 2025	(Afghanistan) 2026	(Australia) 2026
Harry Tector	26	Right-handed	Right-arm off-break	Leinster Lightning	F/T	Test, ODI, T20I	13		(New Zealand) 2026	(Afghanistan) 2026	(India) 2026
Tim Tector	23	Right-handed	Right-arm off-break	Leinster Lightning	R	T20I	4		—	—	(India) 2026
All-rounders
Curtis Campher	27	Right-handed	Right-arm medium-fast	Leinster Lightning	F/T	Test, ODI, T20I	85		(New Zealand) 2026	(Afghanistan) 2026	(Oman) 2026
Gareth Delany	29	Right-handed	Right-arm leg-break	North West Warriors	F/T	T20I	64		—	(Nepal) 2023	(India) 2026
George Dockrell	34	Right-handed	Slow left-arm orthodox	Leinster Lightning	F/T	ODI, T20I	50		(Sri Lanka) 2023	(Afghanistan) 2026	(India) 2026
Jordan Neill	21	Right-handed	Right-arm medium-fast	Northern Knights	—	Test, ODI	39		(Bangladesh) 2025	(Afghanistan) 2026	—
Wicket-keepers
Ben Calitz	24	Left-handed	Right-arm slow	North West Warriors	F/T	ODI, T20I	72		—	(Afghanistan) 2026	(India) 2026
Stephen Doheny	28	Right-handed	Right-arm off-break	Leinster Lightning	F/T	Test	20		(New Zealand) 2026	(South Africa) 2024	(Zimbabwe) 2023
Lorcan Tucker	30	Right-handed	—	Leinster Lightning	F/T	Test, ODI, T20I	3	ODI (VC), T20I (C)	(New Zealand) 2026	(Afghanistan) 2026	(India) 2026
Pace bowlers
Mark Adair	30	Right-handed	Right-arm fast-medium	Northern Knights	F/T	Test, ODI, T20I	32		(New Zealand) 2026	(Afghanistan) 2026	(Oman) 2026
Matt Hollard	27	Right-handed	Right-arm medium-fast	Leinster Lightning	R	T20I	61		—	—	(India) 2026
Josh Little	27	Right-handed	Left-arm fast-medium	Leinster Lightning	F/T	T20I	82		—	(Cricket West Indies) 2025	(Oman) 2026
Thomas Mayes	25	Right-handed	Right-arm medium-fast	Northern Knights	R	Test	22		(New Zealand) 2026	(Cricket West Indies) 2025	—
Barry McCarthy	34	Right-handed	Right-arm fast-medium	Leinster Lightning	F/T	Test, T20I	60		(Bangladesh) 2025	(Cricket West Indies) 2025	(Oman) 2026
Liam McCarthy	24	Left-handed	Right-arm medium-fast	North West Warriors	F/T	Test, ODI, T20I	34		(New Zealand) 2026	(Afghanistan) 2026	(India) 2026
Byron McDonough	25	Right-handed	Right-arm medium	Leinster Lightning	—	ODI	—		—	(Afghanistan) 2026	—
Jai Moondra	29	Left-handed	Right-arm fast-medium	Leinster Lightning	—	ODI, T20I	10		—	(Afghanistan) 2026	(India) 2026
Reuben Wilson	20	Right-handed	Right-arm medium	Northern Knights	E	Test	9		(New Zealand) 2026	—	—
Craig Young	36	Right-handed	Right-arm fast-medium	North West Warriors	F/T	Test, T20I	44		(Bangladesh) 2025	(South Africa) 2024	(Italy) 2026
Spin bowlers
Gavin Hoey	25	Right-handed	Right-arm leg-break	Leinster Lightning	F/T	Test, ODI	59		(Bangladesh) 2025	(Afghanistan) 2026	—
Matthew Humphreys	24	Right-handed	Slow left-arm orthodox	Northern Knights	F/T	Test, T20I	11		(Bangladesh) 2025	(Zimbabwe) 2025	(India) 2026
Andy McBrine	33	Left-handed	Right-arm off-break	North West Warriors	F/T	Test	35		(New Zealand) 2026	(Cricket West Indies) 2025	(Afghanistan) 2022
Ben White	28	Right-handed	Right-arm leg-break	Leinster Lightning	R	T20I	86		(Sri Lanka) 2023	(Scotland) 2023	(Bangladesh) 2025

== Coaching staff ==
Position	Name
High performance director	Graeme West
Head coach	Gary Wilson
high performance batting coach	Ed Joyce
Fast bowling coach	Ryan Eagleson
Spin bowling coach	Chris Brown
Fielding coach	

- Sources:Cricket Ireland

=== Coaching history ===
- 1995–1999: (England) Mike Hendrick
- 1999–2001: (New Zealand) Ken Rutherford
- 2002–2007: (South Africa) Adrian Birrell
- 2007–2015: (Trinidad and Tobago) Phil Simmons
- 2015–2017: (New Zealand) John Bracewell
- 2017–2021: (South Africa) Graham Ford
- 2021–2022: (England) David Ripley (interim)
- 2022–2026: (South Africa) Heinrich Malan
- 2026-Present: Gary Wilson

== Records ==
International match summary – Ireland

**Playing record**
Format	M	W	L	T	D/NR	Inaugural match
Tests	13	3	10	0	0	11 May 2018
One-Day Internationals	219	85	115	3	16	13 June 2006
Twenty20 Internationals	190	80	99	2	9	2 August 2008

Last updated 1 November 2026

=== Test matches ===
- Highest team score: 492 v. Sri Lanka, 24 April 2023 at Galle International Stadium, Galle.
- Best innings bowling: 6/118, Andy McBrine v. Bangladesh on 4 April 2023 at Sylhet International Cricket Stadium, Sylhet.
- Record individual score: 118, Kevin O'Brien v. Pakistan on 11 May 2018 at The Village, Malahide.

**Most Test runs for Ireland**

Player	Runs	Average
**Lorcan Tucker**	**703**	43.93
**Andy McBrine**	**581**	32.27
**Andrew Balbirnie**	**548**	23.82
**Paul Stirling**	**521**	26.05
**Harry Tector**	**474**	26.33

**Most Test wickets for Ireland**

Player	Wickets	Average
**Andy McBrine**	**33**	41.69
**Mark Adair**	**25**	28.60
**Barry McCarthy**	**16**	20.00
**Matthew Humphreys**	**15**	37.13
Tim Murtagh	**13**	16.38

- **Bold** – still playing for Ireland

Test record versus other nations

Opponent	Matches	Won	Lost	Draw	Tied	First win
Afghanistan	2	1	1	0	0	1 March 2024
Bangladesh	3	0	3	0	0	
England	2	0	2	0	0	
New Zealand	1	0	1	0	0	
Pakistan	1	0	1	0	0	
Sri Lanka	2	0	2	0	0	
Zimbabwe	2	2	0	0	0	28 July 2024

Records complete to Test #2619. Last updated 29 May 2026.

=== One-Day Internationals ===
- Highest team score: 359/9 v. New Zealand, 15 July 2022 at Malahide, Dublin.
- Best innings bowling: 6/55, Paul Stirling v. Afghanistan on 17 March 2017 at Greater Noida Sports Complex Ground, Greater Noida.
- Record partnership score: 227 by William Porterfield & Kevin O'Brien v. Kenya, Nairobi, 2 February 2007

**Most ODI runs for Ireland**

Player	Runs	Average
**Paul Stirling**	6,213	37.65
William Porterfield	4,343	30.58
Kevin O'Brien	3,619	29.42
**Andrew Balbirnie**	3,519	31.70
Niall O'Brien	2,581	28.05
**Harry Tector**	2,174	41.80
Ed Joyce (Note: Also played for England; only the player's record for Ireland is counted here.)	2,151	41.36
Gary Wilson	2,072	23.81
**George Dockrell**	1,610	22.00
**Curtis Campher**	1,554	37.00

**Most ODI wickets for Ireland**

Player	Wickets	Average
Kevin O'Brien	114	32.68
**George Dockrell**	113	35.80
Boyd Rankin	96	28.27
**Andy McBrine**	93	38.47
**Craig Young**	81	25.85
**Barry McCarthy**	81	29.20
**Mark Adair**	77	33.07
Tim Murtagh	74	30.94
Trent Johnston	66	32.04
Alex Cusack	63	23.96

Highest ODI scores for Ireland

Player	Runs	Opposition	Venue	Competition	Date
Paul Stirling	177	Canada	Toronto	Irish cricket team in Canada in 2010–11	7 September 2010
Paul Stirling	162	UAE	Bulawayo	2023 Cricket World Cup Qualifier	27 June 2023
Ed Joyce	160*	Afghanistan	Belfast	Afghan cricket team in Ireland in 2016	19 July 2016
Andrew Balbirnie	145*	Afghanistan	Dehradun	Irish cricket team against Afghanistan in India in 2018–19	5 March 2019
Paul Stirling	142	England	Southampton	Irish cricket team in England in 2020	4 August 2020
Kevin O'Brien	142	Kenya	Nairobi (Ruaraka)	2007 ICC World Cricket League Division One	2 February 2007
Harry Tector	140	Bangladesh	Chelmsford	Bangladeshi cricket team against Ireland in England in 2023	12 May 2023
William Porterfield	139	UAE	Dubai	2017–18 United Arab Emirates Tri-Nation Series	13 January 2018
Harry Tector	138	Afghanistan	Sharjah	Irish cricket team against Afghanistan in the UAE in 2023–24	7 March 2024
Andrew Balbirnie	135	West Indies	The Village, Malahide	2019 Ireland Tri-Nation Series	11 May 2019

- **Bold** – still playing for Ireland

ODI record versus other nations

Opponent	M	W	L	T	NR	First win
**v. Full members**
Afghanistan	36	13	22	0	1	3 July 2010
Australia	5	0	4	0	1	
Bangladesh	16	2	11	0	3	15 April 2007
England	15	2	11	0	2	2 March 2011
India	3	0	3	0	0	
New Zealand	7	0	7	0	0	
Pakistan	7	1	5	1	0	17 March 2007
South Africa	11	2	8	0	1	13 July 2021
Sri Lanka	5	0	5	0	0	
West Indies	18	4	12	0	2	16 February 2015
Zimbabwe	25	11	10	1	3	30 September 2010
**v. Associate Members**
Bermuda	1	1	0	0	0	31 January 2007
Canada	8	6	2	0	0	6 April 2009
Kenya	10	7	2	0	1	24 August 2008
Namibia	5	2	3	0	0	22 October 2026
Nepal	1	1	0	0	0	4 July 2023
Netherlands	13	8	3	1	1	11 July 2007
Oman	1	0	1	0	0	
Papua New Guinea	1	1	0	0	0	6 March 2018
Scotland	21	15	5	0	1	5 August 2006
United Arab Emirates	9	8	1	0	0	25 February 2015
United States	1	1	0	0	0	30 June 2023

Records complete to ODI #5056. Last updated 1 November 2026.

=== Twenty20 Internationals ===
- Highest team score: 226/4 v. Austria, 23 July 2023 at The Grange Club, Edinburgh
- Best innings bowling: 4/11, Alex Cusack v. West Indies, 21 February 2014 at Sabina Park, Jamaica

**Most T20I runs for Ireland**

Player	Runs	Average
**Paul Stirling**	3,895	26.31
**Andrew Balbirnie**	2,392	23.45
Kevin O'Brien	1,973	21.21
**Harry Tector**	1,845	24.93
**Lorcan Tucker**	1,730	22.76
**George Dockrell**	1,388	20.41
Gary Wilson	1,268	21.13
**Gareth Delany**	1,245	20.40
William Porterfield	1,079	20.35
**Curtis Campher**	1,067	20.92

**Most T20I wickets for Ireland**

Player	Wickets	Average
**Mark Adair**	142	19.80
**George Dockrell**	91	22.10
**Craig Young**	87	22.24
**Josh Little**	85	25.15
**Barry McCarthy**	73	29.28
**Gareth Delany**	59	26.47
Kevin O'Brien	58	19.81
Boyd Rankin	54	22.12
**Simi Singh**	44	27.84
**Ben White**	36	27.38

**Highest T20I scores for Ireland**

Player	Runs	Opposition, Date
Kevin O'Brien	124	Hong Kong, 7 Oct 2019
Paul Stirling	115*	Zimbabwe, 1 Sep 2021
Ross Adair	100	South Africa, 29 Sep 2024
Harry Tector	96*	Italy, 25 Jan 2026
Paul Stirling	95	West Indies, 15 Jan 2020
Lorcan Tucker	94*	Austria, 23 Jul 2023
Lorcan Tucker	94*	Oman, 14 Feb 2026
Paul Stirling	91	Afghanistan, 23 Feb 2019
Gareth Delany	89*	Oman, 21 Oct 2021
Lorcan Tucker	84	United States, 23 Dec 2021

- **Bold** – still playing for Ireland

T20I record versus other nations

Opponent	M	W	L	T	NR	First win
**v. Full members**
Afghanistan	27	7	18	1	1	1 February 2010
Australia	3	0	3	0	0	
Bangladesh	11	3	7	0	1	8 June 2009
England	4	1	2	0	1	26 October 2022
India	10	2	8	0	0	28 June 2026
New Zealand	5	0	5	0	0	
Pakistan	5	1	4	0	0	10 May 2024
South Africa	7	1	6	0	0	29 September 2024
Sri Lanka	4	0	4	0	0	
West Indies	9	3	4	0	2	19 February 2014
Zimbabwe	18	8	8	0	2	17 March 2014
**v. Associate Members**
Austria	1	1	0	0	0	23 July 2023
Bahrain	1	1	0	0	0	19 February 2022
Bermuda	1	1	0	0	0	3 August 2008
Canada	5	2	3	0	0	22 March 2012
Denmark	1	1	0	0	0	21 July 2023
Germany	1	1	0	0	0	21 February 2022
Hong Kong	4	2	2	0	0	7 October 2019
Italy	4	3	1	0	0	20 July 2023
Jersey	2	2	0	0	0	25 October 2019
Kenya	5	5	0	0	0	4 August 2008
Namibia	2	1	1	0	0	2 November 2019
Nepal	3	3	0	0	0	13 July 2015
Netherlands	15	7	7	0	1	13 February 2010
Nigeria	1	1	0	0	0	26 October 2019
Oman	7	5	2	0	0	13 February 2019
Papua New Guinea	4	2	2	0	0	12 October 2021
Scotland	16	9	4	1	2	2 August 2008
United Arab Emirates	13	6	7	0	0	19 March 2014
United States	2	1	1	0	0	23 December 2021

Records complete to T20I #4004. Last updated 28 June 2026.

=== First-class ===
- Highest team total: 589/7 declared v. UAE, 13 March 2013, ICC Intercontinental Cup match at Sharjah, UAE

Most First-class runs

Player	Matches	Innings	Average	100s	Runs
Kevin O'Brien	38	56	40.17	2	1848
William Porterfield	28	46	40.95	5	1802
Andrew White	30	41	52.81	5	1637
Stanley Bergin	27	52	34.26	2	1610
Niall O'Brien	21	33	49.23	6	1526

Most First-class wickets

Player	Matches	Overs	Average	5WI	Wickets
Jimmy Boucher	28	905.4	14.04	18	168
Trent Johnston	28	632.1	17.20	32	97
Alec O'Riordan	25	749.4	21.39	5	75
George Dockrell	18	642.3	26.06	3	71
Dermott Monteith	19	695.2	18.96	5	70

Highest individual innings

Player	Score	Opponents	Date	Venue
Ed Joyce	231	UAE	2–3 June 2015	Malahide
Eoin Morgan	209*	UAE	11 February 2007	Abu Dhabi
Andrew Balbirnie	205*	Netherlands	15 August 2017	Malahide
Ed Joyce	205	Namibia	24 October 2015	Windhoek
Jeremy Bray	190	UAE	25 February 2005	Windhoek
Andre Botha	186	Scotland	9 August 2007	Belfast
William Porterfield	186	Namibia	24 October 2015	Windhoek
Niall O'Brien	176	UAE	23 October 2005	Windhoek
Niall O'Brien	174	UAE	6 March 2008	Abu Dhabi
Andre Botha	172	Netherlands	9 July 2008	Rotterham

Best bowling in an innings

Player	Figures	Opponents	Date	Venue
Francis Fee	9/26	Scotland	27 July 1957	College Park
Garfield Harrison	9/113	Scotland	11 August 1990	Myreside
Scott Huey	8/48	MCC	04 September 1954	College Park
Robert Gregory	8/80	Scotland	29 August 1912	Rathmines
Bob Lambert	7/11	Scotland	21 July 1910	College Park
Jimmy Boucher	7/13	New Zealand	11 September 1937	Rathmines
Jimmy Boucher	7/18	Scotland	24 June 1950	North Inch Perth
Dermott Monteith	7/38	Scotland	11 August 1973	Mardyke
Roy Torrens	7/40	Scotland	10 August 1974	Cambusdoon Ayr
Henry Morgan	7/41	Scotland	17 June 1933	Ormeau

Note: Ivan Anderson's 198* v. Canada was in a non-first-class match

== See also ==
- Cricket in Ireland
- Irish national cricket captains
- Ireland under-19 cricket team
- Irish women's cricket team
- List of Ireland Test cricketers
- List of Ireland ODI cricketers
- List of Ireland T20I cricketers
- List of Ireland Twenty20 International records

== Notes ==
Preceded by Bangladesh	Test match playing teams 11 May 2018	Succeeded by Afghanistan
