= Kevin O'Brien (cricketer) =

Irish cricketer (born 1984)

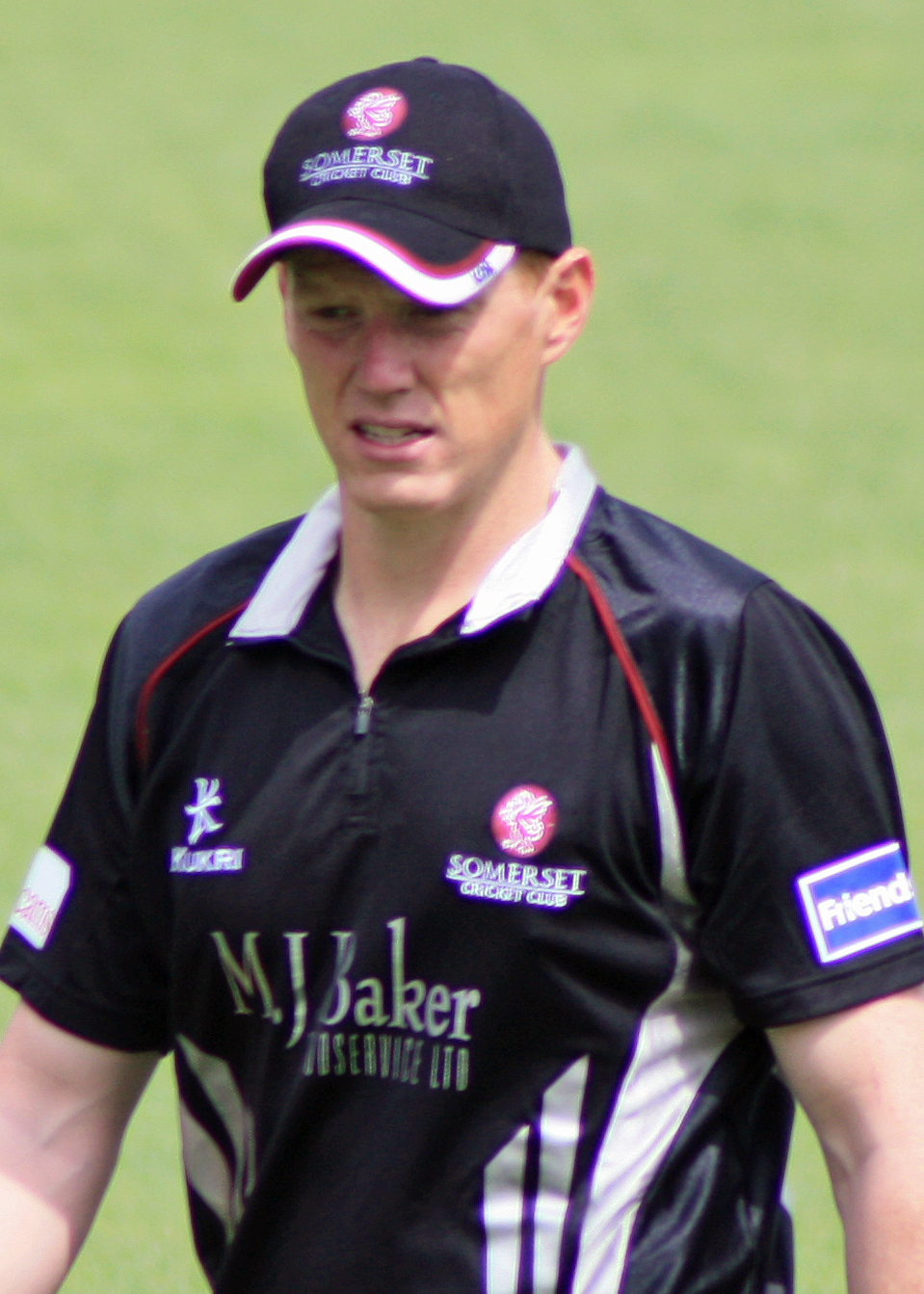
- O'Brien in 2012

Personal information
- Full name: Kevin Joseph O'Brien
- Born: 4 March 1984 (age 42); Dublin, Ireland
- Batting: Right-handed
- Bowling: Right arm medium-fast
- Role: All-rounder
- Relatives: Brendan O'Brien (father); Niall O'Brien (brother)

International information
- National side: Ireland (2006–2021)
- Test debut (cap 6): 11 May 2018 v Pakistan
- Last Test: 24 July 2019 v England
- ODI debut (cap 10): 13 June 2006 v England
- Last ODI: 7 June 2021 v Netherlands
- ODI shirt no.: 22
- T20I debut (cap 6): 2 August 2008 v Scotland
- Last T20I: 22 October 2021 v Namibia
- T20I shirt no.: 22

Domestic team information
- Years: Team
- 2009: Nottinghamshire
- 2011: Gloucestershire
- 2012: Somerset
- 2013: Rangpur Riders
- 2013–2021: Leinster Lightning
- 2013–2014: Surrey
- 2013–2014: Trinidad and Tobago Red Steel
- 2014/15–2015/16: Northern Districts
- 2015–2016: Leicestershire
- 2018: Kandahar Knights
- 2022: Munster Reds

Head coaching information
- Years: Team
- 2024–present: Biratnagar Kings

Career statistics
Competition	Test	ODI	T20I	FC
Matches	3	153	110	47
Runs scored	258	3,619	1,973	2,039
Batting average	51.60	29.42	21.21	37.07
100s/50s	1/1	2/18	1/5	2/14
Top score	118	142	124	171*
Balls bowled	60	4,296	917	2,745
Wickets	0	114	58	47
Bowling average	–	32.68	19.81	27.74
5 wickets in innings	–	0	0	1
10 wickets in match	–	0	0	0
Best bowling	–	4/13	4/45	5/39
Catches/stumpings	0/–	67/–	40/–	36/–
- Source: ESPNcricinfo, 23 February 2022

Kevin Joseph O'Brien (born 4 March 1984) is an Irish cricket coach and former cricketer who played for Leinster and Railway Union Cricket Club. On 16 August 2022, he announced his retirement from international cricket.

He scored the fastest (later surpassed) century in 50-over World Cup, coming from 50 balls against England on 2 March 2011. O'Brien was one of the eleven cricketers to play in Ireland's first ever Test match, against Pakistan, in May 2018, scoring the first Test century for Ireland men's cricket and becoming the first sportsperson from Ireland to represent his country in 300 matches.

O'Brien is an aggressive right-handed middle to lower order batsman and a right-arm medium-fast bowler. He made his One Day International (ODI) debut in 2006 in Ireland's inaugural match. O'Brien played for Nottinghamshire in 2009, and in 2010 was awarded a contract with Cricket Ireland, making him one of six players with a full-time contract with the board. He was the first player for Ireland to take 100 wickets in ODIs.

In December 2018, he was one of nineteen players to be awarded a central contract by Cricket Ireland for the 2019 season. In January 2020, he was one of nineteen players to be awarded a central contract from Cricket Ireland, the first year in which all contracts were awarded on a full-time basis. In June 2021, O'Brien announced his retirement from ODI cricket, to allow him to focus on T20 and Test cricket.

== Personal life and education ==
Kevin O'Brien was educated at Marian College, Ballsbridge. He has a degree in marketing and advertising. His brother Niall was also a member of the Irish team. Their father Brendan played 52 times for Ireland. His sister, Ciara, played for the Irish women's hockey team.

== Career ==
=== International breakthrough ===
Kevin O'Brien represented Ireland in the Under-19s World Cup of 2004 in which he made 241 runs to help his country reach the Plate Semi-Final before being defeated by Australia Under-19s. The following year he played for the MCC Young Cricketers.

In June 2006, he made his One Day International debut in Ireland's inaugural ODI game, against England in Belfast. Bowling first he took 1 for 47 off his 10 overs as England managed 301. His wicket came off his first delivery and was that of captain Andrew Strauss who was caught at square leg by Andre Botha. Batting at number 8, O'Brien made 35 from 48 balls but Ireland fell 38 runs short.

In Ireland's disappointing World Cricket League campaign in Kenya, O'Brien was one of the success stories. In their second game of the tournament, against Bermuda, O'Brien took his career best figures of 2 for 38 by taking the wickets of middle order batsmen David Hemp and Lionel Cann. In the chase he made 54, his maiden ODI half century and helped his side win with 8 balls to spare. When Ireland made 284 batting first against Kenya in the following game it was O'Brien who made half of the runs. His innings of 142 was the highest ever by an Irish batsman and was made off 128 balls, containing 10 fours and 6 sixes. Ireland then took on Canada and O'Brien continued his good form with the bat by making his 3rd consecutive score of fifty plus with a composed 52. The final game of the tournament came against the Netherlands and despite failing with the bat he took 2 wickets. He finished as the second top scorer in the League with 263 runs at 52.80.

The next tour for O'Brien was the 2007 World Cup in the Caribbean and it would be his biggest test yet as 6 of his 7 One Day International games prior had been against non-Test playing nations. Their opening game against Zimbabwe finished in a tie when Zimbabwe collapsed in the dying stages. O'Brien came on to bowl in the 49th over with Zimbabwe requiring 9 runs from 12 balls and 3 wickets in hand. His first ball was a full toss but Zimbabwean captain Prosper Utseya hit it straight to Eoin Morgan at cover to give him his first World Cup wicket. Chris Mpofu was run out off O'Brien's final delivery and he finished the penultimate over with a wicket maiden. Ireland came up against Pakistan in the next game and they restricted the Test nation to just 132 with O'Brien taking the wicket of Shoaib Malik. O'Brien came in to bat with his side at 70/4 and he added 38 runs with his brother Niall. Ireland eventually won by 3 wickets and O'Brien finished unbeaten on 16 from 52 balls. His highest score of the tournament came in the Super Eight stage against New Zealand where he made 49, hitting 3 sixes. He missed out on his half century when he was run out by his brother. Arguably his best performance of the World Cup was his fast 48 runs scored against Bangladesh which helped secure a historic Irish victory.

On 8 June 2009, O'Brien guided Ireland to victory over Bangladesh in the Twenty20 Cricket World Cup. O'Brien was one of seven Ireland players to be nominated for the 2009 Associate and Affiliate Player of the Year (there were fourteen nominees in all), although he did not make the shortlist. (Note: The award was eventually won by William Porterfield.)

=== Trial with Nottinghamshire ===
O'Brien was signed by Nottinghamshire County Cricket Club in 2009 on a trial basis. The previous season O'Brien had scored 93 against the club, impressing Mick Newell, Nottinghamshire's director of cricket. He joined the club after the end of Ireland were knocked out of the Friends Provident Trophy, a domestic competition in England. In his stint with the club, O'Brien played eight list A matches, scoring 79 runs at an average of 13.16 with a highest of 42, and taking one wicket for 72 runs; he also played five T20 matches for Nottinghamshire, scoring 31 runs and taking two wickets. During his time with Nottinghamshire, he also played as a professional for Plumtree Cricket Club in the Nottinghamshire Premier League.

=== Professional contract with Ireland ===
Cricket Ireland, the governing body for cricket in Ireland, awarded O'Brien a full-time "category A" contract in January 2010. He was one of six players to be awarded such contracts with Cricket Ireland (four players received category B contracts and five category C), and came just a year after the first professional contracts were awarded to Ireland's cricketers. Before that players were amateurs relying on income from other jobs and playing cricket in their spare time. The contract allowed O'Brien and the others to focus on cricket, with the aim of improving ahead of the 2011 World Cup.

In Ireland's first match at the Sri Lanka Associates T20 Series against Afghanistan, O'Brien performed poorly overall. With the bat he managed only 1 run from 2 balls before having to depart. His bowling figures ended at 0–34, but Ireland managed to seal the win by 5 wickets. In their second match against Canada, O'Brien finished with 0–38 in the Canadian innings, and 5 off 2 balls with the bat as Ireland narrowly lost by 4 runs. In the third and final game (against Sri Lanka A), O'Brien ended the tournament wicketless after 0–15 off two overs. He managed 11 off ten balls as Ireland put in a spirited performance but lost by 5 wickets.

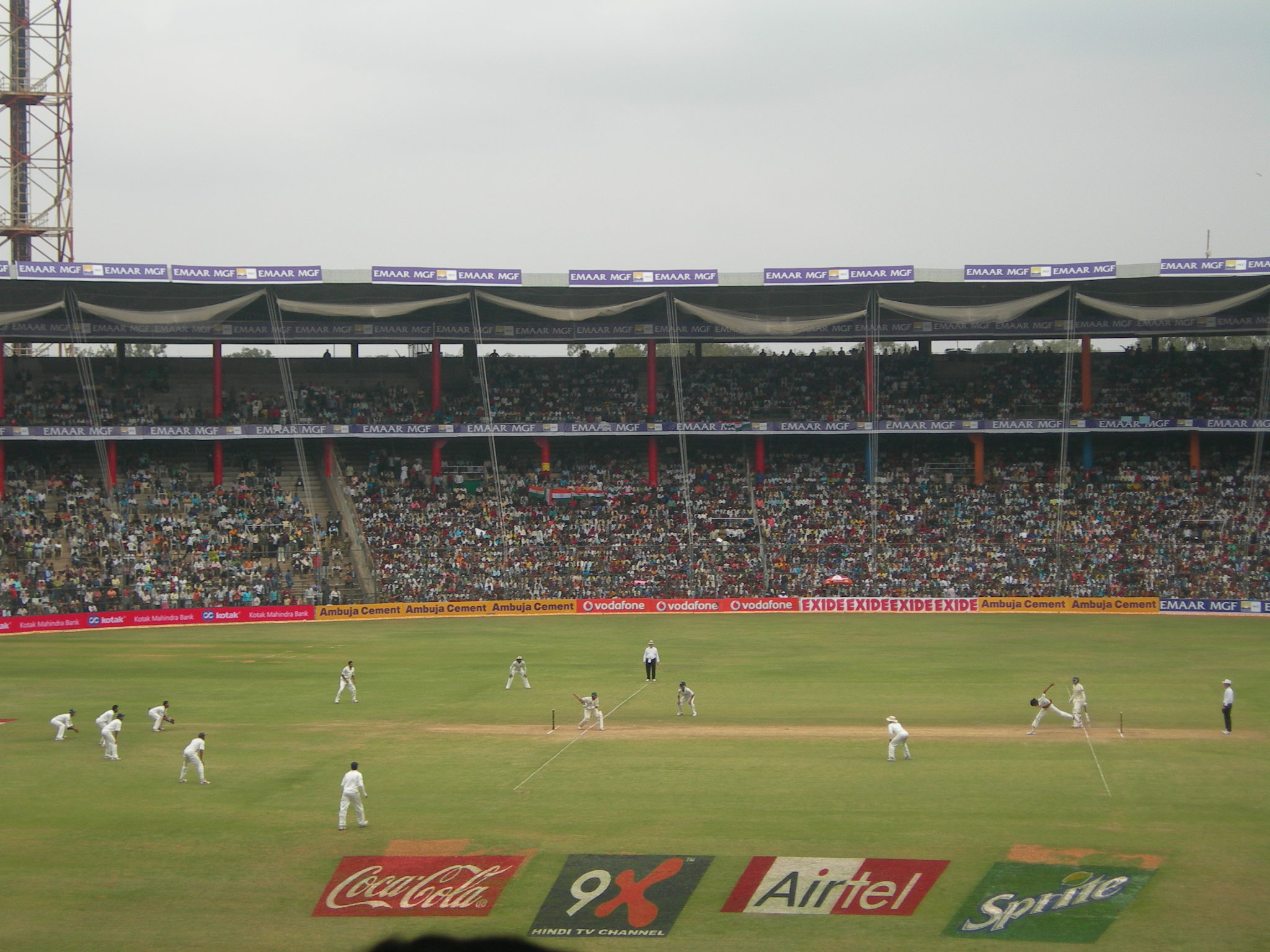
The M. Chinnaswamy Stadium cricket ground in India where O'Brien scored the fastest century in World Cup history.

In 2010, O'Brien was again nominated for the Associate and Affiliate Player of the Year Award, this time alongside two other Ireland players (there were 16 nominees in all); the award was given to Netherlands Ryan ten Doeschate. O'Brien was selected in Ireland's 15-man squad for the 2011 World Cup hosted by Bangladesh, India, and Sri Lanka. On 2 March O'Brien hit the fastest century in World Cup history, off just 50 balls against England helping his team to successfully chase down a target of 328 when at one stage they were struggling at 111/5. In that World Cup match against England he along with Alex Cusack set the highest ever 6th wicket partnership in World Cup history (162). Ireland won two of their matches, but failed to progress beyond the first round, finishing six out of seven in their group. With 198 runs at an average of 39.60, O'Brien finished as Ireland's second highest run-scorer in the tournament. On 23 May 2013, at Clontarf Cricket Club Ground, Dublin, he scored an unbeaten 84 in 47 balls against Pakistan which helped Ireland to tie the match. Ireland required 15 runs in the last over to win the match, O'Brien hit last ball of Saeed Ajmal to boundary to pull out a thrilling 'tie' for the Irish team.

=== County cricket ===
O'Brien's performance at the World Cup attracted the attention of Gloucestershire County Cricket Club and he secured a contract with the club for 2011. John Bracewell, Gloucestershire's coach, viewed O'Brien as primarily a one-day player and believed his style of batting was best suited to situations where the team needed to increase their run-rate. He made his debut for Gloucestershire on 15 May, scoring three runs from four balls in a CB40 match against Glamorgan. In June he scored his first century in twenty20 cricket, beating his previous highest score of 39. His innings of 119 runs against Middlesex came from 52 deliveries and helped lift Gloucestershire to the highest total in the history of domestic T20 cricket. O'Brien shared an opening stand of 192 with Hamish Marshall, who also scored a century, and the pair set a record partnership for any wicket in the format.(But this record was broken in just a few years) When O'Brien was finally dismissed, he received a standing ovation. Both Kevin O'Brien and Hamish Marshall became the first pair of batsmen to score centuries in a single T20.

O'Brien also signed a contract to play in the first season of the Sri Lankan Premier League, which was scheduled to take place in late July and early August, however the competition was postponed until 2012, allowing O'Brien to spend more time at Gloucestershire. His stint with Gloucestershire also clashed with some of Ireland's international matches. Scotland hosted Ireland and Sri Lanka in July for a tri-series; Ireland's match against Sri Lanka was rained off and in the Scotland match O'Brien was dismissed off his first ball. After the internationals O'Brien returned to Gloucestershire, and again helped his team to victory over Middlesex, this time scoring 58 not out from 35 balls. Gloucestershire finished the Friend's Life t20 competition with four wins from sixteen matches, leaving them 8th out of nine teams in their group. O'Brien – who scored 365 runs from 14 matches, making him the club's second-highest run-scorer in the competition, just two runs behind Marshall – felt he had been consistent with the bat for Gloucestershire, but that his bowling had been underused.

Such was O'Brien's effect on the team was that, along with batsman Paul Stirling, he was one of two Ireland players shortlisted for Associate and Affiliate Player of the Year at the 2011 ICC Awards. Although a full-strength team played against England in an ODI in August, county commitments meant many of Ireland's senior players were unavailable to play in the team's opening match of the 2011–13 Intercontinental Cup. With regular captain William Porterfield playing for Warwickshire and Trent Johnston who often stood in injured, O'Brien was chosen to lead Ireland against Namibia. He had led Ireland in one-day matches before, but this was the first time he had captained in first-class cricket. In October Ireland sent a seven-man squad captained by O'Brien to participate in the Hong Kong Sixes. At the start of 2012 O'Brien was made Ireland's vice captain, taking over the role from Trent Johnston. Soon after, Cricket Ireland increased the number of players with contracts from 15 to 23; O'Brien was one of four players to be given a category A contract.

In February 2012 Ireland toured Kenya for an Intercontinental Cup match followed by two ODIs and two T20Is. During the tour O'Brien was fined 20% of his match fee for "using offensive language when leaving the field after being bowled".

Kevin O'Brien has signed for Gloucestershire County Club to play a single season in 2016 in all First-class, List A, and T20 and he is a List A specialist.

=== Test cricket and beyond ===
In May 2018, he was named in a fourteen-man squad for Ireland's first ever Test match, which was played against Pakistan later the same month. He made his Test debut for Ireland, against Pakistan, on 11 May 2018, becoming the first sportsperson from Ireland to appear in 300 matches for his country. He was the top scorer for Ireland in the first innings, with 40 runs. In the second innings of the match, he scored Ireland's first ever Test fifty, and then first ever Test century. Despite Ireland losing the Test by five wickets, O'Brien won the man of the match award for his batting performance.

In January 2019, he was named in Ireland's squad for their one-off Test against Afghanistan in India. O'Brien recorded his second 50 in the second innings.

In September 2019, he was named in Ireland's squad for the 2019 ICC T20 World Cup Qualifier tournament in the United Arab Emirates. Ahead of the tournament, the International Cricket Council (ICC) named him as the key player in Ireland's squad. Later the same month, during the 2019–20 Oman Pentangular Series, O'Brien became the first batsman for Ireland to score a century in a T20I match, when he made 124 against Hong Kong.

On 10 July 2020, O'Brien was named in Ireland's 21-man squad to travel to England to start training behind closed doors for the ODI series against the England cricket team. In September 2021, O'Brien was named in Ireland's provisional squad for the 2021 ICC Men's T20 World Cup.

On 16 August, O’Brien announced his retirement from international cricket. O’Brien said “I had hoped to retire after the World Cup in Australia but having not been picked for the Irish squad since last year’s World Cup, I feel that the selectors and management are looking elsewhere.”

== Playing style ==
O'Brien is a strong batsman, with the ability to clear the ropes. In his record-breaking century against England in the 2011 World Cup in Bangalore, he hit the longest six of the tournament. His brother Niall stated that, "in the field he was grumpy, he was moping around ... when he's like that, he tends to kinda take the bull by the horns". In March 2011 Ireland's coach, Phil Simmons, remarked of O'Brien that, ”There's a lot more thought to his batting and he has worked on different things like batting against spin. He doesn't have the facilities of a county but he is working hard on his game at home."
