= Niall O'Brien (cricketer) =

Irish cricketer (born 1981)

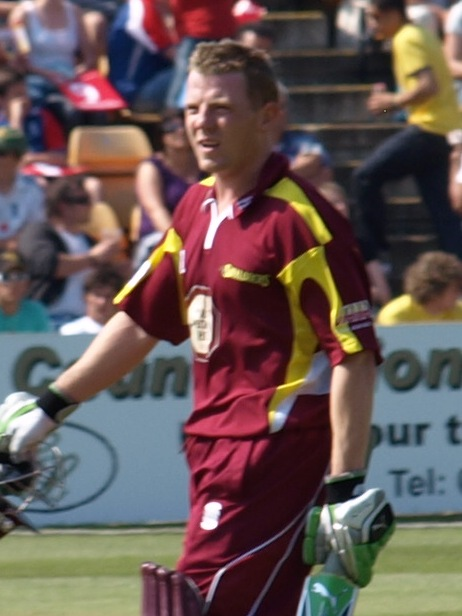
- O'Brien in 2009

Personal information
- Full name: Niall John O'Brien
- Born: 8 November 1981 (age 45); Dublin, Ireland
- Nickname: Paddy
- Height: 5 ft 7 in (1.70 m)
- Batting: Left-handed
- Role: Batsman, Wicketkeeper
- Relatives: Brendan O'Brien (father); Kevin O'Brien (brother)

International information
- National side: Ireland (2005–2018)
- Only Test (cap 7): 11 May 2018 v Pakistan
- ODI debut (cap 13): 5 August 2006 v Scotland
- Last ODI: 31 August 2018 v Afghanistan
- ODI shirt no.: 72 (formerly 0)
- T20I debut (cap 7): 2 August 2008 v Scotland
- Last T20I: 13 March 2016 v Netherlands
- T20I shirt no.: 72

Domestic team information
- Years: Team
- 2004–2006: Kent
- 2007–2012: Northamptonshire
- 2012: Khulna Royal Bengals
- 2013: Rangpur Riders
- 2013–2016: Leicestershire (squad no. 10)
- 2017–2018: North West Warriors

Career statistics
Competition	Test	ODI	T20I	FC
Matches	1	103	30	176
Runs scored	18	2,581	466	9,057
Batting average	9.00	28.05	17.92	35.51
100s/50s	0/0	1/18	0/1	15/48
Top score	18	109	50	182
Balls bowled	–	–	–	18
Wickets	–	–	–	2
Bowling average	–	–	–	9.50
5 wickets in innings	–	–	–	0
10 wickets in match	–	–	–	0
Best bowling	–	–	–	1/4
Catches/stumpings	2/0	90/14	17/10	492/48
- Source: ESPNcricinfo, 12 June 2019

Niall John O'Brien (born 8 November 1981) is a former Irish cricketer and a cricket commentator. He is a left-handed batsman and wicket-keeper. Domestically O'Brien began his professional career with Kent in 2004 before joining Northamptonshire at the start of 2007, spending six seasons there before joining Leicestershire for 2013.

He made his One Day International debut for Ireland in 2006; two years later he played his first Twenty20 International. He was one of the eleven cricketers to play in Ireland's first ever Test match, against Pakistan, in May 2018.

O'Brien has also played in overseas twenty20 leagues, first the Indian Cricket League in 2008 and then the Bangladesh Premier League on its formation in 2012. His brother, Kevin, plays alongside him in the Ireland team while his father, Brendan, played cricket for Ireland from 1966 to 1981.

In October 2018, O'Brien announced his retirement from cricket.

== Personal life and education ==
O'Brien was educated in Marian College, Ballsbridge. His brother Kevin is also a member of the Ireland team. Their father Brendan played 52 times for Ireland. His sister Ciara O'Brien is in the Ireland women's hockey team.

== Domestic career ==
Niall first gained recognition playing domestic cricket in Leinster for the Railway Union Cricket Club earning a call up to the Ireland A team. From there he established himself as Ireland's number one wicketkeeper. O'Brien himself has said that he has a fiery temperament. On 17 June 2004, he angered Brian Lara when Lara refused to walk after being apparently caught behind. Ireland caused an upset when they went on to win the match, with O'Brien scoring 58* off 57 balls. In 2006 he was banned for one ICC Intercontinental Cup match after an outburst criticising the groundsman at an Intercontinental Cup game with Scotland because of condition of the pitch.

O'Brien has spent many an Australian summer playing for Mosman Cricket Club in the Sydney Grade Cricket competition. O'Brien also assumed a part-time coaching role while at the club and considers the time spent in Australia as some of the most vital parts of his career. He also played two seasons of first grade for North Sydney in the Sydney Grade Competition in 2003/04 and 2005/06. He also played a season with the Mosman club as an 18-year-old.

Along with fellow Ireland player Ed Joyce, O'Brien made a series of impressive performances for Ireland before starting to take part in English cricket with Kent. O'Brien found multiple chances to perform for his county as fellow wicket-keeper Geraint Jones has found himself performing more often for the England cricket team.

After being released by Kent he signed a one-year deal with Northamptonshire for 2007. In the same year, he joined the Essel Group's Indian Cricket League (ICL) to represent the Delhi Jets team for one season. O'Brien became the first player to play international cricket after playing in the ICL when he played an Intercontinental Cup match against United Arab Emirates in March 2008; he went on to score 174 in Ireland's nine-wicket win.

At the end of the 2008 season, O'Brien was named Northamptonshire's player of the year and was rewarded for his consistent performances with a three-year contract with the club. A representative of Northamptonshire CCC said "Niall, who has just returned from international duty, was in sensational form last season with the bat, scoring over 850 championship runs and piling on the runs in one-day competitions in a new pinch-hitter role". In a tour match against Australia during the 2009 Ashes in July 2009, O'Brien made scores of 30 and 58 in a match Northamptonshire lost. During his half century, he scored seven boundaries off the struggling Mitchell Johnson.

O'Brien missed most of the 2010 season after undergoing finger surgery in July; in his absence, David Murphy was Northamptonshire's first-choice wicket-keeper.

In 2012, O'Brien signed a contract worth $80,000 with Khulna Royal Bengals represent them in the newly formed Bangladesh Premier League, a domestic t20 competition. In five matches he scored 54 runs. At the end of the 2012 English County season, O'Brien left Northamptonshire after six seasons. In October 2012, it was announced that Leicestershire had signed O'Brien in a three-year deal.

== International career ==
His innings of 72 from 107 balls in the 2007 Cricket World Cup group match against Pakistan helped Ireland earn an upset victory and also earned him the man of the match award.

O'Brien was one of seven Ireland players to be nominated for the 2009 Associate and Affiliate Player of the Year (there were fourteen nominees in all), although he did not make the 4-man short-list. O'Brien was selected in Ireland's 15-man squad for the 2011 World Cup.

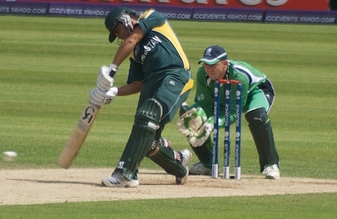
O'Brien keeping wicket against Pakistan during the 2009 ICC World Twenty20.

O'Brien set a World Twenty20 record with his 4 dismissals against Sri Lanka in the Super 8 stage of the 2009 ICC World Twenty20. O'Brien was selected in Ireland's 15-man squad for the 2011 World Cup to be hosted by Bangladesh, India, and Sri Lanka between February and April. During the tournament he became the third player to score 1,000 ODI runs for Ireland after William Porterfield and his brother Kevin. He passed this landmark in Ireland's five-wicket defeat to India. In the same match, O'Brien and Porterfield established a new records for Ireland's third wicket in ODI, putting on 113 runs together. Ireland were due to play two ODIs against Pakistan in May, however O'Brien suffered an injury to his hand and was forced to miss the fixtures.

On 16 February 2015, he smashed unbeaten 79 runs off 60 balls with 11 fours, guided Ireland to the victory against another Test match playing nations, the West Indies. This was Ireland's third consecutive victory over test playing nations in three consecutive world cups. O'Brien's score was helped to beat mighty West Indian pace attack and finally Irish won their first match of 2015 ICC Cricket World Cup.

On 23 March 2018, in Ireland's match against Afghanistan in the 2018 Cricket World Cup Qualifier, O'Brien played in his 100th ODI match.

=== Test cricket ===
In May 2018, he was named in a fourteen-man squad for Ireland's first ever Test match, which was played against Pakistan later the same month. He made his Test debut for Ireland, against Pakistan, on 11 May 2018. The Test match commenced on 12 May 2018, after the first day was washed out. However, he was dismissed for a duck in the first innings.
