= List of Ireland Test cricket records =

Test cricket is the oldest form of cricket played at international level. A Test match is scheduled to take place over a period of five days, (Note: For the first 50 years of Test cricket matches were played over three or four days and until the 1930s some timeless Tests were played.) (Note: In October 2017, the ICC Board approved a trial of four-day Test cricket to run through until the 2019 Cricket World Cup.) and is played by teams representing Full Member nations of the International Cricket Council (ICC).

Ireland played their first Test match in 2018, becoming the eleventh Test nation. Since then, they have played nine Test matches, winning two and losing seven.

This is a List of Ireland Test cricket records. It is based on the List of Test cricket records, but concentrates solely on records dealing with Ireland Test cricket team, and any cricketers who have played for that team.

== Key ==
The top five records are listed for each category, except for the team wins, losses, draws and ties and the partnership records. Tied records for fifth place are also included. Explanations of the general symbols and cricketing terms used in the list are given below. Specific details are provided in each category where appropriate. All records include matches played for Ireland only, and are correct as of June 2020.

Key
Symbol	Meaning
†	Player or umpire is currently active in Test cricket
*	Player remained not out or partnership remained unbroken
♠	Test cricket record
d	Innings was declared (e.g. 8/758d)
Date	Starting date of the Test match
Innings	Number of innings played
Matches	Number of matches played
Opposition	The team Ireland was playing against
Period	The time period when the player was active in Test cricket
Player	The player involved in the record
Venue	Test cricket ground where the match was played

== Team records ==
=== Team wins, losses, draws and ties ===
As of February 2025, Ireland has played 10 Test matches resulting in 3 victories and 7 defeats.

Opponent	Matches	Won	Lost	Drawn	Tied	% Won	Span
Afghanistan	2	1	1	0	0	50.00	2019–2024
Australia	YTP						
Bangladesh	3	0	3	0	0	0.00	2023–2025
England	2	0	2	0	0	0.00	2019–2023
India	YTP						
New Zealand	1	0	1	0	0	0.00	2026–2026
Pakistan	1	0	1	0	0	0.00	2018–2018
South Africa	YTP						
Sri Lanka	2	0	2	0	0	0.00	2023–2023
West Indies	YTP						
Zimbabwe	2	2	0	0	0	100.00	2024–2025
Total	13	3	10	0	0	23	
Last updated: 29 May 2026

=== First Test series wins ===
Opponent	Year of first Home win	Year of first Away win
Afghanistan	YTP	2024
Australia	YTP	
Bangladesh	YTP	-
England	YTP	-
India	YTP	
New Zealand	YTP	
Pakistan	-	YTP
South Africa	YTP	
Sri Lanka	YTP	-
West Indies	YTP	
Zimbabwe	2024	2025
Last updated: 10 Feb 2025

=== First Test match wins ===
Opponent	Home		Away	
Opponent	Venue	Year	Venue	Year
Afghanistan	YTP		Abu Dhabi	2024
Australia	YTP		YTP	
Bangladesh	YTP		-	
England	YTP		-	
India	YTP		YTP	
New Zealand	YTP		YTP	
Pakistan	-		YTP	
South Africa	YTP		YTP	
Sri Lanka	YTP		-	
West Indies	YTP		YTP	
Zimbabwe	Belfast	2024	Bulawayo	2025
Last updated: 7 October 2024

=== Team scoring records ===
==== Most runs in an innings ====
Rank	Score	Opposition	Venue	Date
1	492	Sri Lanka	Galle International Stadium, Galle, Sri Lanka	25 April 2023
2	362	England	Lord's, London, England	1 June 2023
3	339	Pakistan	The Village, Dublin, Ireland	11 May 2018
4	298	Zimbabwe	Queens Sports Club, Bulawayo, Zimbabwe	6 February 2025
5	292	Bangladesh	Sher-e-Bangla National Cricket Stadium, Mirpur, Bangladesh	4 April 2023
Last updated: 9 February 2025

==== Highest successful run chases ====
Rank	Score	Opposition	Venue	Date
1	158	Zimbabwe	Civil Service Cricket Club, Belfast, Ireland	25 July 2024
2	111	Afghanistan	Tolerance Oval, Abu Dhabi, United Arab Emirates	28 February 2024

==== Fewest runs in an innings ====
Rank	Score	Opposition	Venue	Date
1	38	England	Lord's, London, England	24 July 2019
2	130	Pakistan	The Village, Dublin, Ireland	11 May 2018
3	143	Sri Lanka	Galle International Stadium, Galle, Sri Lanka	16 April 2023
4	168	Sri Lanka	Galle International Stadium, Galle, Sri Lanka	16 April 2023
5	172	Afghanistan	Rajiv Gandhi International Cricket Stadium, Dehradun, India	15 March 2019
5	172	England	Lord's, London, England	1 June 2023
Last updated: 2 June 2023

==== Most runs conceded in an innings ====
Rank	Score	Opposition	Venue	Date
1	704/3d	Sri Lanka	Galle International Stadium, Galle, Sri Lanka	24 April 2023
2	591/6d	Sri Lanka	Galle International Stadium, Galle, Sri Lanka	16 April 2023
3	587/8d	Bangladesh	Sylhet International Cricket Stadium, Sylhet, Bangladesh	11 November 2025
4	524/4d	England	Lord's, London, England	1 June 2023
5	490/8d	New Zealand	Stormont Cricket Ground, Belfast, Northern Ireland	28 May 2026
Last updated: 29 May 2025

==== Fewest runs conceded in an innings ====
Rank	Score	Opposition	Venue	Date
1	85	England	Lord's, London, England	24 July 2019
2	155	Afghanistan	Tolerance Oval, Abu Dhabi, UAE	28 February 2024
3	197	Zimbabwe	Civil Service Cricket Club, Belfast, Ireland	25 July 2024
4	210	Zimbabwe	Civil Service Cricket Club, Belfast, Ireland	25 July 2024
5	218	Afghanistan	Tolerance Oval, Abu Dhabi, UAE	28 February 2024
Last updated: 28 July 2024

=== Result records ===
==== Greatest win margins (by runs) ====
Rank	Margin	Opposition	Venue	Date
1	63 runs	Zimbabwe	Bulawayo Athletic Club, Zimbabwe	10 February 2025

==== Greatest win margins (by wickets) ====
Rank	Margin	Opposition	Venue	Date
1	6 wickets	Afghanistan	Tolerance Oval, Abu Dhabi, United Arab Emirates	28 February 2024
2	4 wickets	Zimbabwe	Civil Service Cricket Club, Belfast, Ireland	25 July 2024

==== Narrowest win margins (by runs) ====
Rank	Margin	Opposition	Venue	Date
1	63 runs	Zimbabwe	Bulawayo Athletic Club, Zimbabwe	10 February 2025

==== Narrowest win margins (by wickets) ====
Rank	Margin	Opposition	Venue	Date
1	4 wickets	Zimbabwe	Civil Service Cricket Club, Belfast, Ireland	25 July 2024
2	6 wickets	Afghanistan	Tolerance Oval, Abu Dhabi, United Arab Emirates	28 February 2024

==== Greatest loss margins (by an innings) ====
Rank	Margin	Opposition	Venue	Date
1	Innings & 280 runs	Sri Lanka	Galle International Stadium, Galle, Sri Lanka	16 April 2023
2	Innings & 79 runs	New Zealand	Stormont Cricket Ground, Belfast, Northern Ireland	29 May 2026
3	Innings & 47 runs	Bangladesh	Sylhet International Cricket Stadium, Sylhet, Bangladesh	11 November 2025
4	Innings & 10 runs	Sri Lanka	Galle International Stadium, Galle, Sri Lanka	24 April 2023
Last updated: 29 May 2026

==== Greatest loss margins (by runs) ====
Rank	Margin	Opposition	Venue	Date
1	217 runs	Bangladesh	Sher-e-Bangla National Cricket Stadium, Mirpur, Bangladesh	19 November 2025
2	143 runs	England	Lord's, London, England	24 July 2019
Last updated: 23 November 2025

==== Greatest loss margins (by wickets) ====
Rank	Margin	Opposition	Venue	Date
1	10 wickets	England	Lord's, London, England	1 June 2023
2	7 wickets	Afghanistan	Rajiv Gandhi International Cricket Stadium, Dehradun, India	15 March 2019
2	7 wickets	Bangladesh	Sher-e-Bangla National Cricket Stadium, Mirpur, Bangladesh	4 April 2023
4	5 wickets	Pakistan	The Village, Dublin, Ireland	11 May 2018
Last updated: 4 June 2023

== Individual records ==
=== Batting records ===
==== Most career runs ====
Rank	Runs	Player	Matches	Innings	Average	100	50	Period
1	753	Lorcan Tucker†	10	20	41.83	1	5	2023–2026
2	667	Andy McBrine†	12	23	35.10	0	6	2019–2026
3	575	Andrew Balbirnie†	13	26	23.00	0	5	2018–2026
4	521	Paul Stirling†	10	19	26.05	1	2	2018–2025
5	492	Harry Tector†	10	20	24.60	0	5	2023–2026
6	466	Curtis Campher†	10	20	25.88	1	1	2023–2026
7	397	Mark Adair†	8	15	33.08	0	2	2019–2015
8	258	Kevin O'Brien	3	6	51.60	1	1	2018–2019
9	201	Peter Moor†	7	14	14.35	0	1	2023–2025
10	199	James McCollum	6	12	18.09	0	0	2019–2023
Last updated: 7 June 2026

==== Most runs against each team ====
Opposition	Runs	Player	Matches	Innings	Period	Ref
Afghanistan	146	Andrew Balbirnie†	2	4	2019–2024	
Australia	YTP					
Bangladesh	277	Lorcan Tucker†	3	6	2023–2025	
England	116	Andy McBrine†	2	4	2019–2023	
India	YTP					
New Zealand	86	Andy McBrine†	1	2	2026–2026	
Pakistan	158	Kevin O'Brien	1	2	2018–2018	
South Africa	YTP					
Sri Lanka	179	Harry Tector†	2	4	2023–2023	
West Indies	YTP					
Zimbabwe	189	Andy McBrine†	2	4	2024–2025	
Last updated: 23 November 2025.

==== Most runs in each batting position ====
Batting position	Batsman	Innings	Runs	Average	Span	Ref
Opener	Andrew Balbirnie†	11	219	21.9	2024–2026	
Number 3	Andrew Balbirnie†	14	318	22.71	2018–2023	
Number 4	Harry Tector†	18	472	26.22	2023–2026	
Number 5	Paul Stirling†	11	254	23.09	2018–2025	
Number 6	Lorcan Tucker†	13	452	41.09	2023–2026	
Number 7	Lorcan Tucker†	5	286	57.2	2023–2026	
Number 8	Andy McBrine†	10	313	34.77	2023–2026	
Number 9	Mark Adair†	6	206	41.2	2023–2026	
Number 10	James Cameron-Dow	2	41	41.00	2019–2019	
Number 10	Gavin Hoey†	2	41	20.50	2025–2025	
Number 11	Tim Murtagh	4	91	45.50	2018–2019	
Last updated: 7 June 2026.

==== Highest individual score ====
Rank	Runs	Player	Opposition	Venue	Date
1	118	Kevin O'Brien	Pakistan	The Village, Dublin, Ireland	11 May 2018
2	111	Curtis Campher	Sri Lanka	Galle International Stadium, Galle, Sri Lanka	24 April 2023
3	108	Lorcan Tucker	Bangladesh	Sher-e-Bangla National Cricket Stadium, Mirpur, Bangladesh	4 April 2023
4	103	Paul Stirling	Sri Lanka	Galle International Stadium, Galle, Sri Lanka	24 April 2023
5	95	Andrew Balbirnie	Sri Lanka	Galle International Stadium, Galle, Sri Lanka	24 April 2023
Last updated: 25 April 2023

==== Highest individual score – progression of record ====
Runs	Player	Opponent	Venue	Season
118	Kevin O'Brien	Pakistan	The Village, Dublin, Ireland	2018
Last updated: 12 March 2021

==== Highest individual score against each team ====
Opposition	Runs	Player	Venue	Date	Ref
Afghanistan	82	Andrew Balbirnie	Rajiv Gandhi International Cricket Stadium, Dehradun, India	15 March 2019	
Australia	YTP				
Bangladesh	108	Lorcan Tucker	Shere Bangla National Stadium, Dhaka, Bangladesh	4 April 2023	
England	88	Mark Adair	Lord's, London, England	1 June 2023	
India	YTP				
New Zealand	73*	Andy McBrine	Stormont Cricket Ground, Belfast, Northern Ireland	29 May 2026	
Pakistan	118	Kevin O'Brien	The Village, Dublin, Ireland	11 May 2018	
South Africa	YTP				
Sri Lanka	111	Curtis Campher	Galle International Stadium, Galle, Sri Lanka	24 April 2023	
West Indies	YTP				
Zimbabwe	90	Andy McBrine	Queens Sports Club, Bulawayo, Zimbabwe	6 February 2025	
Last updated: 6 February 2025

==== Highest career average ====
Rank	Average	Player	Innings	Runs	Not out	100	50	Period
1	41.40	Lorcan Tucker†	16	621	1	1	3	2023–2025
2	35.00	Andy McBrine†	19	560	3	0	5	2023–2025
3	28.45	Mark Adair†	13	313	2	0	2	2019–2025
4	26.94	Paul Stirling†	19	512	0	1	2	2018–2025
5	25.37	Harry Tector†	17	424	0	0	4	2023–2025
Qualification: 10 Innings. Last updated: 20 November 2025

==== Highest Average in each batting position ====
Batting position	Batsman	Innings	Runs	Average	Span	Ref
Opener	Paul Stirling†	6	179	29.83	2019–2025	
Number 3	Andrew Balbirnie†	14	318	22.71	2018–2023	
Number 4	Harry Tector†	18	472	26.22	2023–2026	
Number 5	Curtis Campher†	7	150	25.00	2023–2026	
Number 6	Lorcan Tucker†	13	452	41.09	2023–2026	
Number 7	Andy McBrine†	6	267	89.00	2024–2026	
Number 8	Andy McBrine†	10	313	34.77	2023–2026	
Number 9	Mark Adair†	6	206	41.2	2023–2026	
Number 10	James Cameron-Dow	2	41	41.00	2019–2019	
Number 11	Matthew Humphreys†	5	40	13.33	2024–2025	
Last updated: 7 June 2026. Qualification: Min 5 innings batted at position

==== Most half-centuries ====
Rank	Half centuries	Player	Innings	Runs	Period
1	5	Andrew Balbirnie†	23	535	2018–2025
2	4	Harry Tector†	17	424	2023–2025
2	4	Andy McBrine†	18	508	2019–2025
4	3	Lorcan Tucker†	16	621	2023–2025
5	2	Mark Adair†	13	313	2019–2025
5	2	Paul Stirling†	19	512	2018–2025
Last updated: 11 November 2025

==== Most centuries ====
Rank	Centuries	Player	Innings	Runs	Period
1	1	Kevin O'Brien	6	258	2018–2019
1	1	Lorcan Tucker†	16	621	2023–2025
1	1	Curtis Campher†	16	391	2023–2025
1	1	Paul Stirling†	19	512	2018–2025
Last updated: 8 February 2025

==== Most Sixes ====
Rank	Sixes	Player	Innings	Runs	Period
1	7	Harry Tector†	17	424	2023–2025
2	7	Paul Stirling†	19	512	2018–2025
3	6	Curtis Campher†	16	391	2023–2025
4	5	Mark Adair†	13	313	2019–2025
5	4	Lorcan Tucker†	16	621	2019–2025
Last updated: 20 November 2025

==== Most Fours ====
Rank	Fours	Player	Innings	Runs	Period
1	81	Lorcan Tucker†	16	621	2023–2025
2	68	Paul Stirling†	19	512	2018–2025
3	67	Andy McBrine†	19	560	2019–2025
4	63	Andrew Balbirnie†	23	535	2018–2025
5	57	Curtis Campher†	16	391	2023–2025
Last updated: 20 November 2025

==== Most runs in a series ====
Rank	Runs	Player	Matches	Innings	Series
1	179	Harry Tector	2	4	Irish cricket team in Sri Lanka in 2022-23
2	158	Kevin O'Brien	1	2	Pakistan in Ireland in 2018
3	153	Curtis Campher	2	4	Irish cricket team in Sri Lanka in 2022-23
4	151	Andrew Balbirnie	2	4	Irish cricket team in Sri Lanka in 2022-23
5	145	Lorcan Tucker	1	2	Irish cricket team in Bangladesh in 2022-23
Last updated: 28 April 2023

==== Most ducks in career ====
Rank	Ducks	Player	Matches	Innings	Period
1	4	Andrew Balbirnie†	11	23	2018–2025
2	3	Curtis Campher†	9	17	2023–2025
2	3	Peter Moor†	7	14	2023–2025
2	3	Harry Tector†	9	17	2023–2025
5	2	Murray Commins†	2	4	2023–2023
5	2	Gary Wilson	2	4	2018–2019
5	2	Mark Adair†	7	13	2019–2025
Last updated: 11 November 2025

== Bowling records ==
=== Most career wickets ===
Rank	Wickets	Player	Matches	Innings	Average	SR	Period
1	32	Andy McBrine†	11	16	40.43	71.00	2019–2025
2	25	Mark Adair†	7	13	28.60	47.68	2019–2025
3	16	Barry McCarthy†	4	7	20.00	40.31	2024–2025
4	15	Matthew Humphreys†	5	6	33.53	60.46	2019–2019
5	13	Tim Murtagh	3	6	16.38	43.84	2018–2019
6	10	Stuart Thompson	3	6	20.40	41.00	2018–2019
7	8	Craig Young†	4	7	30.25	56.00	2024–2025
8	7	Boyd Rankin	2	4	31.85	45.42	2018–2019
9	6	Curtis Campher†	9	10	77.50	100.00	2023–2025
10	4	Ben White†	3	4	109.00	114.75	2023–2023
Last updated: 20 November 2025

=== Most wickets against each team ===
Opposition	Wickets	Player	Matches	Innings	Average	Period	Ref
Afghanistan	8	Mark Adair†	1	2	11.87	2024–2024	
Australia	YTP						
Bangladesh	15	Andy McBrine†	3	5	33.46	2023–2025	
England	6	Tim Murtagh	1	2	10.83	2019–2019	
England	6	Mark Adair†	2	4	39.50	2019–2023	
India	YTP						
New Zealand	3	Mark Adair†	1	1	22.00	2026–2026	
Pakistan	6	Tim Murtagh	1	2	16.66	2018–2018	
South Africa	YTP						
Sri Lanka	3	Curtis Campher†	2	2	61.66	2023–2023	
West Indies	YTP						
Zimbabwe	11	Andy McBrine†	2	4	18.45	2024–2025	
Last updated: 7 June 2026

=== Best figures in an innings ===
Rank	Figures	Player	Opposition	Venue	Date
1	6/57	Matthew Humphreys	Zimbabwe	Queens Sports Club, Bulawayo, Zimbabwe	10 February 2025
2	6/118	Andy McBrine	Bangladesh	Sher-e-Bangla National Cricket Stadium, Dhaka, Bangladesh	5 April 2023
3	5/13	Tim Murtagh	England	Lord's, London, England	24 July 2019
4	5/39	Mark Adair	Afghanistan	Tolerance Oval, Abu Dhabi, UAE	28 February 2024
5	4/38	Andy McBrine	Zimbabwe	Civil Service Cricket Club, Belfast, Ireland	25 July 2024
Last updated: 10 February 2025

=== Best bowling figures against each team ===
Opposition	Figures	Player	Venue	Date	Ref
Afghanistan	5/39	Mark Adair	Tolerance Oval, Abu Dhabi, UAE	28 February 2024	
Australia	YTP				
Bangladesh	6/109	Andy McBrine	Sher-e-Bangla National Cricket Stadium, Dhaka, Bangladesh	20 November 2025	
England	5/13	Tim Murtagh	Lord's, London, England	24 July 2019	
India	YTP				
New Zealand	3/66	Mark Adair	Stormont Cricket Ground, Belfast, Northern Ireland	29 May 2026	
Pakistan	4/45	Tim Murtagh	The Village, Dublin, Ireland	11 May 2018	
South Africa	YTP				
Sri Lanka	2/84	Curtis Campher	Galle International Stadium, Galle, Sri Lanka	16 April 2023	
West Indies	YTP				
Zimbabwe	6/57	Matthew Humphreys	Queens Sports Club, Bulawayo, Zimbabwe	10 February 2025	
Last updated: 20 November 2025

=== Best figures in a match ===
Rank	Figures	Player	Opposition	Venue	Date
1	8/95	Mark Adair	Afghanistan	Tolerance Oval, Abu Dhabi, UAE	28 February 2024
2	7/75	Andy McBrine	Zimbabwe	Civil Service Cricket Club, Belfast, Ireland	25 July 2024
3	7/95	Matthew Humphreys	Zimbabwe	Queens Sports Club, Bulawayo, Zimbabwe	10 February 2025
4	7/170	Andy McBrine	Bangladesh	Sher-e-Bangla National Cricket Stadium, Dhaka, Bangladesh	4 April 2023
5	6/65	Tim Murtagh	England	Lord's, London, England	24 July 2019
Last updated: 10 February 2025

=== Best career average ===
Rank	Average	Player	Wickets	Runs	Balls	Period
1	16.38	Tim Murtagh	13	213	570	2018–2019
2	20.00	Barry McCarthy†	16	320	645	2024–2025
3	28.60	Mark Adair†	25	715	1,192	2019–2025
4	37.13	Matthew Humphreys†	15	557	997	2023–2025
5	41.69	Andy McBrine†	33	1,376	2,428	2019–2025
Last updated: 23 November 2025. Qualification: 500 balls

=== Best career strike rate ===
Rank	Strike rate	Player	Wickets	Runs	Balls	Period
1	40.3	Barry McCarthy†	16	320	645	2024–2025
2	43.8	Tim Murtagh	13	213	570	2018–2019
3	47.6	Mark Adair†	25	715	1,192	2019–2025
4	66.4	Matthew Humphreys†	15	557	997	2023–2025
5	73.5	Andy McBrine†	33	1,376	2,428	2019–2025
Last updated: 10 February 2025. Qualification: 500 balls

=== Best career economy rate ===
Rank	Economy rate	Player	Runs	Balls	Wickets	Period
1	2.24	Tim Murtagh	213	570	13	2018–2019
2	2.97	Barry McCarthy†	320	645	16	2024–2025
3	3.35	Matthew Humphreys†	557	997	15	2023–2025
4	3.40	Andy McBrine†	1,376	2,428	33	2019–2025
5	3.59	Mark Adair†	715	1,192	25	2019–2025
Last updated: 23 November 2025. Qualification: 500 balls

=== Most five-wicket hauls in an innings ===
Rank	Five-wicket hauls	Player	Innings	Balls	Wickets	Period
1	2	Andy McBrine†	16	2,272	32	2019–2025
1	2	Matthew Humphreys†	6	907	15	2023–2025
2	1	Tim Murtagh	6	570	13	2018–2019
2	1	Mark Adair†	13	1192	18	2019–2025
Last updated: 20 November 2025

=== Most ten-wicket hauls in a match ===
No Irish bowler has taken 10 wickets in a match yet.

=== Most runs conceded in an innings ===
Rank	Runs	Figure	Player	Overs	Opposition	Venue	Date	
1	203	0/203	Ben White	34.0	Sri Lanka	Galle International Stadium, Galle, Sri Lanka	24 April 2023	
2	191	1/191	Andy McBrine	57.0	Sri Lanka	Galle International Stadium, Galle, Sri Lanka	24 April 2023	
3	170	5/170	Andy McBrine	Matthew Humphreys	43.0	Bangladesh	Sylhet International Cricket Stadium, Sylhet, Bangladesh	11 November 2025
4	162	1/162	Andy McBrine	40.0	Sri Lanka	Galle International Stadium, Galle, Sri Lanka	16 April 2023	
5	151	2/151	Matthew	50.0	Bangladesh	Shere Bangla National Stadium, Mirpur, Bangladesh	19 November 2025	
Last updated: 29 May 2026

=== Worst figures in an innings ===
Rank	Figures	Player	Overs	Opposition	Venue	Date
1	0/203	Ben White	34.0	Sri Lanka	Galle International Stadium, Galle, Sri Lanka	24 April 2023
2	0/127	Mark Adair	20.0	England	Lord's, London, England	1 June 2023
3	0/88	Curtis Campher	13.0	England	Lord's, London, England	1 June 2023
4	0/86	Tyrone Kane	20.0	Pakistan	The Village, Dublin, Ireland	11 May 2018
5	0/67	Matthew Humphreys	10.0	Sri Lanka	Galle International Stadium, Galle, Sri Lanka	24 April 2023
Last updated: 3 June 2023

=== Worst figures in a match ===
Rank	Figures	Player	Overs	Opposition	Venue	Date
1	0/203	Ben White	34.0	Sri Lanka	Galle International Stadium, Galle, Sri Lanka	24 April 2023
2	0/139	Mark Adair	20.4	England	Lord's, London, England	1 June 2023
3	0/103	Tyrone Kane	26.0	Pakistan	The Village, Dublin, Ireland	11 May 2018
4	0/88	Curtis Campher	13.0	England	Lord's, London, England	1 June 2023
5	0/67	Matthew Humphreys	10.0	Sri Lanka	Galle International Stadium, Galle, Sri Lanka	24 April 2023
Last updated:4 June 2023

=== Most wickets in a series ===
Rank	Wickets	Player	Matches	Series
1	8	Mark Adair	1	Ireland vs Afghanistan in the UAE in 2023-24
2	7	Andy McBrine	1	Zimbabwe in Ireland in 2024
2	7	Matthew Humphreys	1	Ireland in Zimbabwe in 2024-25
2	7	Andy McBrine	1	Ireland in Bangladesh in 2022-23
5	6	Tim Murtagh	1	Ireland in England in 2019
5	6	Barry McCarthy	1	Ireland in Zimbabwe in 2024-25
5	6	Mark Adair	1	Ireland in England in 2019
5	6	Tim Murtagh	1	Pakistan in Ireland in 2018
Last updated: 10 February 2025

== Wicket-keeping records ==
=== Most career dismissals ===
Rank	Dismissals	Player	Matches	Innings	Catches	Stumping	Dis/Inn	Period
1	24	Lorcan Tucker†	9	14	22	2	1.714	2023–2025
2	6	Gary Wilson	2	2	6	0	3.000	2018–2019
3	3	Stuart Poynter	1	2	2	1	1.500	2019–2019
4	2	Niall O'Brien	1	2	2	0	1.000	2018–2018
Last updated: 20 November 2025

=== Most career catches ===
Rank	Catches	Player	Matches	Innings	Period
1	22	Lorcan Tucker†	9	14	2023–2025
2	6	Gary Wilson	2	2	2018–2019
3	2	Niall O'Brien	1	2	2018–2018
3	2	Stuart Poynter	1	2	2019–2019
Last updated: 13 November 2025

=== Most career stumpings ===
Rank	Stumpings	Player	Matches	Innings	Period
1	2	Lorcan Tucker†	9	14	2023–2025
2	1	Stuart Poynter	1	2	2019–2019
Last updated: 9 February 2025

=== Most dismissals in an innings ===
Rank	Dismissals	Player	Opposition	Venue	Date
1	4	Lorcan Tucker	Afghanistan	Tolerance Oval, Abu Dhabi, UAE	28 February 2024
2	3	Gary Wison	England	Lord's, London, England	24 July 2019
2	3	Gary Wison	England	Lord's, London, England	24 July 2019
2	3	Lorcan Tucker	Bangladesh	Sher-e-Bangla National Cricket Stadium, Mirpur, Bangladesh	4 April 2023
2	3	Lorcan Tucker	Sri Lanka	Galle International Stadium, Galle, Sri Lanka	16 April 2023
2	3	Lorcan Tucker	Zimbabwe	Civil Service Cricket Club, Belfast, Ireland	25 July 2024
2	3	Lorcan Tucker	Zimbabwe	Civil Service Cricket Club, Belfast, Ireland	25 July 2024
Last updated: 10 February 2025

=== Most dismissals in a match ===
Rank	Dismissals	Player	Opposition	Venue	Date
1	6	Gary Wilson	England	Lord's, London, England	24 July 2019
1	6	Lorcan Tucker	Zimbabwe	Civil Service Cricket Club, Belfast, Ireland	25 July 2024
3	5	Lorcan Tucker	Afghanistan	Tolerance Oval, Abu Dhabi, UAE	28 February 2024
4	4	Lorcan Tucker	Zimbabwe	Queens Sports Club, Bulawayo, Zimbabwe	6 February 2025
5	3	Stuart Poynter	Afghanistan	Rajiv Gandhi International Cricket Stadium, Dehradun, India	15 March 2019
5	3	Lorcan Tucker	Bangladesh	Sher-e-Bangla National Cricket Stadium, Mirpur, Bangladesh	4 April 2023
5	3	Lorcan Tucker	Sri Lanka	Galle International Stadium, Galle, Sri Lanka	16 April 2023
Last updated: 10 February 2025

=== Most dismissals in a series ===
Rank	Dismissals	Player	Matches	Innings	Series
1	6	Gary Wilson	1	2	Ireland in England in 2019
1	6	Lorcan Tucker	1	2	Zimbabwe in Ireland in 2024
3	5	Lorcan Tucker	1	2	Ireland vs Afghanistan in the UAE in 2024
4	4	Lorcan Tucker	1	2	Ireland in Zimbabwe in 2024–25
5	3	Stuart Poynter	1	2	Afghanistan v Ireland in India in 2019
5	3	Lorcan Tucker	1	2	Ireland in Bangladesh in 2022–23
5	3	Lorcan Tucker	2	2	Ireland in Sri Lanka in 2023
Last updated: 10 February 2025

== Fielding records ==
=== Most career catches ===
Rank	Catches	Player	Matches	Innings	Ct/Inn	Period
1	14	Andrew Balbirnie†	12	20	0.700	2018–2025
2	8	Paul Stirling†	10	17	0.470	2018–2025
3	5	Matthew Humphreys†	5	7	0.714	2023–2025
3	5	Harry Tector†	9	14	0.357	2023–2025
4	4	Mark Adair†	7	13	0.307	2019–2025
Last updated: 20 November 2025

=== Most catches in a series ===
Rank	Catches	Player	Matches	Innings	Series
1	3	Paul Stirling	1	2	Pakistan in Ireland in 2018
2	2	James Cameron-Dow	1	2	Afghanistan v Ireland in India in 2019
2	2	William Porterfield	1	2	Pakistan in Ireland in 2018
2	2	James McCollum	1	2	Ireland in England in 2019
Last updated: 12 March 2021

== Other records ==
=== Most career matches ===
Rank	Matches	Player	Runs	Wkts	Period
1	12	Andrew Balbirnie†	535	-	2018–2025
2	11	Andy McBrine†	560	32	2019–2025
3	10	Paul Stirling†	512	-	2018–2025
4	9	Curtis Campher†	391	6	2023–2025
4	9	Lorcan Tucker†	621	-	2023–2025
4	9	Harry Tector†	410	-	2023–2025
Last updated: 20 November 2025

=== Most consecutive career matches ===
Rank	Matches	Player	Period
1	3	Andrew Balbirnie	2018–2019
1	3	Tim Murtagh	2018–2019
1	3	Kevin O'Brien	2018–2019
1	3	William Porterfield	2018–2019
1	3	Paul Stirling	2018–2019
1	3	Stuart Thompson	2018–2019
Last updated: 12 March 2021

=== Most matches as captain ===
Rank	Matches	Player	Won	Lost	Tied	Draw	%W	%L	Period
1	8	Andrew Balbirnie†	3	5	0	0	42.85	57.14	2023–2025
2	3	William Porterfield	0	3	0	0	0.00	100	2018–2019
Last updated: 16 November 2025

==== Most man of the match awards ====
Rank	M.O.M. Awards	Player	Matches	Period
1	2	Andy McBrine†	9	2019–2025
2	1	Kevin O'Brien	3	2018–2019
2	1	Mark Adair†	7	2019–2025
Last updated: 10 February 2025

=== Youngest players on Debut ===
Rank	Age	Player	Opposition	Venue	Date
1	19 years and 252 days	Reuben Wilson†	New Zealand	Civil Service Cricket Club, Belfast, Ireland	27 May 2026
2	20 years and 69 days	Jordan Neill	Bangladesh	Sylhet International Cricket Stadium, Sylhet, Bangladesh	11 November 2025
3	20 years and 208 days	Matthew Humphreys	Sri Lanka	Galle International Stadium, Galle, Sri Lanka	24 April 2023
4	23 years and 119 days	Mark Adair	England	Lord's, London, England	24 July 2019
4	23 years and 119 days	Harry Tector	Bangladesh	Sher-e-Bangla National Cricket Stadium, Mirpur, Bangladesh	4 April 2023
Last updated: 16 November 2025

=== Oldest players on Debut ===
Rank	Age	Player	Opposition	Venue	Date
1	39 years and 231 days	Ed Joyce	Pakistan	The Village, Dublin, Ireland	11 May 2018
2	36 years and 282 days	Tim Murtagh	Pakistan	The Village, Dublin, Ireland	11 May 2018
3	36 years and 184 days	Niall O'Brien	Pakistan	The Village, Dublin, Ireland	11 May 2018
4	34 years and 68 days	Kevin O'Brien	Pakistan	The Village, Dublin, Ireland	11 May 2018
5	33 years and 330 days	Craig Young	Afghanistan	Tolerance Oval, Abu Dhabi, UAE	28 February 2024
Last updated: 28 February 2024

=== Oldest players ===
Rank	Age	Player	Opposition	Venue	Date
1	39 years and 231 days	Ed Joyce	Pakistan	The Village, Dublin, Ireland	11 May 2018
2	37 years and 356 days	Tim Murtagh	England	Lord's, London, England	24 July 2019
3	36 years and 184 days	Niall O'Brien	Pakistan	The Village, Dublin, Ireland	11 May 2018
4	35 years and 221 days	Craig Young†	Bangladesh	Sylhet International Cricket Stadium, Sylhet, Bangladesh	11 November 2025
5	35 years and 150 days	Andy Balbirnie†	New Zealand	Civil Service Cricket Club, Belfast, Ireland	27 May 2026
Last updated: 16 November 2025

== Partnership records ==
=== Highest partnerships by wicket ===
Wicket	Runs	First batsman	Second batsman	Opposition	Venue	Date
1st wicket	71	Peter Moor	Andrew Balbirnie	Zimbabwe	Civil Service Cricket Club, Belfast, Ireland	25 July 2024
2nd wicket	96	Paul Stirling	Cade Carmichael	Bangladesh	Sylhet International Cricket Stadium, Sylhet, Bangladesh	11 November 2025
3rd wicket	104	James McCollum	Andrew Balbirnie	Afghanistan	Rajiv Gandhi International Cricket Stadium, Dehradun, India	15 March 2019
4th wicket	115*	Paul Stirling	Andrew Balbirnie	Sri Lanka	Galle International Stadium, Galle, Sri Lanka	24 April 2023
5th wicket	89	Lorcan Tucker	Curtis Campher	Sri Lanka	Galle International Stadium, Galle, Sri Lanka	24 April 2023
6th wicket	96	Lorcan Tucker	Andy McBrine	Zimbabwe	Civil Service Cricket Club, Belfast, Ireland	25 July 2024
7th wicket	163	Mark Adair	Andy McBrine	England	Lord's, London, England	1 June 2023
8th wicket	74	Lorcan Tucker	Jordan Neill	Bangladesh	Sher-e-Bangla National Cricket Stadium, Mirpur, Bangladesh	19 November 2025
9th wicket	54	Jordan Neill	Barry McCarthy	Bangladesh	Sylhet International Cricket Stadium, Sylhet, Bangladesh	11 November 2025
9th wicket	54	Curtis Campher	Gavin Hoey	Bangladesh	Sher-e-Bangla National Cricket Stadium, Mirpur, Bangladesh	19 November 2025
10th wicket	87	Tim Murtagh	George Dockrell	Afghanistan	Rajiv Gandhi International Cricket Stadium, Dehradun, India	15 March 2019
Last updated: 23 November 2025

=== Highest partnerships by runs ===
Wicket	Runs	First batsman	Second batsman	Opposition	Venue	Date
7th wicket	163	Andy McBrine	Mark Adair	England	Lord's, London, England	1 June 2023
4th wicket	115*	Andrew Balbirnie	Paul Stirling	Sri Lanka	Galle International Cricket Stadium, Dehradun, Sri Lanka	24 April 2023
7th wicket	114	Kevin O'Brien	Stuart Thompson	Pakistan	The Village, Dublin, Ireland	11 May 2018
7th wicket	111	Lorcan Tucker	Andy McBrine	Bangladesh	Sher-e-Bangla National Cricket Stadium, Mirpur, Bangladesh	4 April 2023
3rd wicket	104	James McCollum	Andrew Balbirnie	Afghanistan	Rajiv Gandhi International Cricket Stadium, Dehradun, India	15 March 2019
Last updated: 4 June 2023

=== Highest overall partnership runs by a pair ===
Rank	Runs	Innings	Players	Highest	Average	100/50	Span
1	504	8	Mark Adair & Andy McBrine †	163	72.00	3/0	2023–2026
2	461	11	Andy McBrine & Lorcan Tucker †	111	41.9	1/2	2023–2026
3	343	8	Andrew Balbirnie & Paul Stirling †	115*	49.00	1/1	2019–2025
4	321	10	Curtis Campher & Harry Tector †	74	32.1	0/3	2023–2026
5	195	10	Andrew Balbirnie & Harry Tector †	104	21.66	0/0	2023–2026
An asterisk (*) signifies an unbroken partnership (i.e. neither of the batsmen was dismissed before either the end of the allotted overs or the required score being reached). Last updated: 7 June 2026

== Umpiring records ==
=== Most matches umpired ===
No Irish umpire has stood in Tests yet.
