= Irish cricket team in Zimbabwe in 2024–25 =

International cricket tour

Irish cricket team in Zimbabwe in 2025
	Zimbabwe	Ireland
- Dates: 6 – 25 February 2025
Captains	Johnathan Campbell (Test); Craig Ervine (ODIs); Sikandar Raza (T20Is)	Andrew Balbirnie (Test); Paul Stirling (ODIs & T20Is)

Test series
- Result: Ireland won the 1-match series 1–0
Most runs	Wessly Madhevere (110)	Andy McBrine (106)
Most wickets	Blessing Muzarabani (8)	Matthew Humphreys (7)

One Day International series
- Results: Zimbabwe won the 3-match series 2–1
Most runs	Brian Bennett (247)	Paul Stirling (130)
Most wickets	Blessing Muzarabani (6); Richard Ngarava (6)	Mark Adair (6)
- Player of the series: Brian Bennett (Zim)

Twenty20 International series
- Results: Zimbabwe won the 3-match series 1–0
Most runs	Ryan Burl (80)	Lorcan Tucker (46)
Most wickets	Trevor Gwandu (3)	Craig Young (8)

The Ireland cricket team toured Zimbabwe in February 2025 to play the Zimbabwe cricket team. The tour consisted of one Test, three One Day Internationals (ODI) and three Twenty20 International (T20I) matches. In January 2025, Zimbabwe Cricket (ZC) confirmed the fixtures for the tour.

Ireland won the one-off Test match by 63 runs. Matthew Humphreys took six wickets in the last innings to record the best Test innings bowling figures for Ireland.

== Squads ==
Zimbabwe			Ireland		
Test	ODIs	T20Is	Test	ODIs	T20Is
Johnathan Campbell (c); ~~Craig Ervine (c)~~; Brian Bennett; Ben Curran; Joylord Gumbie (wk); Trevor Gwandu; Takudzwanashe Kaitano; Wessly Madhevere; Vincent Masekesa; Nyasha Mayavo (wk); Blessing Muzarabani; Richard Ngarava; Newman Nyamhuri; Victor Nyauchi; Nick Welch; Sean Williams	Craig Ervine (c); Brian Bennett; Johnathan Campbell; Ben Curran; Trevor Gwandu; Wessly Madhevere; Tinotenda Maposa; Tadiwanashe Marumani; Wellington Masakadza; Nyasha Mayavo (wk); Blessing Muzarabani; Richard Ngarava; Newman Nyamhuri; Sikandar Raza; Sean Williams	Sikandar Raza (c); Brian Bennett; Ryan Burl; Johnathan Campbell; Trevor Gwandu; Wessly Madhevere; Tinotenda Maposa; Tadiwanashe Marumani; Wellington Masakadza; Nyasha Mayavo (wk); Tony Munyonga; Tashinga Musekiwa; Blessing Muzarabani; Dion Myers; Richard Ngarava; Newman Nyamhuri	Andrew Balbirnie (c); Mark Adair; Curtis Campher; Gavin Hoey; Graham Hume; Matthew Humphreys; Andy McBrine; Barry McCarthy; PJ Moor (wk); Paul Stirling; Harry Tector; Morgan Topping; Lorcan Tucker (wk); Craig Young	Paul Stirling (c); Mark Adair; Andrew Balbirnie; Curtis Campher; George Dockrell; Gavin Hoey; Graham Hume; Matthew Humphreys; Josh Little; Andy McBrine; ~~Barry McCarthy~~; Jordan Neill; Harry Tector; Morgan Topping; Lorcan Tucker (wk); Craig Young	Paul Stirling (c); Mark Adair; ~~Ross Adair~~; Curtis Campher; Gareth Delany; George Dockrell; Fionn Hand; Graham Hume; Matthew Humphreys; Josh Little; ~~Barry McCarthy~~; Neil Rock (wk); Harry Tector; Tim Tector; Lorcan Tucker (wk); Ben White

On 14 February, Barry McCarthy was ruled out of the ODI and T20I series due to an abdominal muscle injury and Jordan Neill named in ODI squad and Fionn Hand named in T20I squad as his replacement. On 17 February, Ross Adair was ruled out of the T20I series due to a calf injury, with Tim Tector named as his replacement.

== Only Test ==
6–10 February 2025
Scorecard

Ireland	v	Zimbabwe
260 (56.4 overs); Andy McBrine 90* (132); Blessing Muzarabani 7/58 (18 overs)		267 (86.1 overs); Nick Welch 90 (173); Barry McCarthy 4/75 (22 overs)
298 (93.3 overs); Andrew Balbirnie 66 (160); Richard Ngarava 4/55 (17.3 overs)		228 (86.3 overs); Wessly Madhevere 84 (195); Matthew Humphreys 6/57 (28 overs)

Ireland won by 63 runs
Queens Sports Club, Bulawayo
Umpires: Kumar Dharmasena (SL) and Ahsan Raza (Pak)
Player of the match: Andy McBrine (Ire)

- Ireland won the toss and elected to bat.
- Johnathan Campbell, Nyasha Mayavo and Nick Welch (Zim) all made their Test debuts.
- Johnathan Campbell captained Zimbabwe after Craig Ervine withdrew due to the birth of his child, and thus became the 36th player to captain his country on Test debut.
- Matthew Humphreys (Ire) took his first five-wicket haul in Tests.

== ODI series ==
=== 1st ODI ===
14 February 2025
09:30
Scorecard

Zimbabwe; 299/5 (50 overs)	v	Ireland; 250 (46 overs)
Brian Bennett 169 (163); Mark Adair 2/55 (10 overs)		Curtis Campher 44 (57); Blessing Muzarabani 4/51 (9 overs)

Zimbabwe won by 49 runs
Harare Sports Club, Harare
Umpires: Allahudien Paleker (SA) and Langton Rusere (Zim)
Player of the match: Brian Bennett (Zim)

- Ireland won the toss and elected to field.
- Johnathan Campbell (Zim) made his ODI debut.
- Brian Bennett (Zim) scored his maiden century in ODIs.

=== 2nd ODI ===
16 February 2025
09:30
Scorecard

Zimbabwe; 245 (49 overs)	v	Ireland; 249/4 (48.4 overs)
Wessly Madhevere 61 (70); Mark Adair 4/54 (10 overs)		Paul Stirling 89 (102); Trevor Gwandu 2/50 (9 overs)

Ireland won by 6 wickets
Harare Sports Club, Harare
Umpires: Iknow Chabi (Zim) and Allahudien Paleker (SA)
Player of the match: Curtis Campher (Ire)

- Ireland won the toss and elected to field.

=== 3rd ODI ===
18 February 2025
09:30
Scorecard

Ireland; 240/6 (50 overs)	v	Zimbabwe; 246/1 (39.3 overs)
Andrew Balbirnie 64 (99); Richard Ngarava 2/42 (10 overs)		Ben Curran 118* (130); Graham Hume 1/39 (8 overs)

Zimbabwe won by 9 wickets
Harare Sports Club, Harare
Umpires: Forster Mutizwa (Zim) and Allahudien Paleker (SA)
Player of the match: Ben Curran (Zim)

- Zimbabwe won the toss and elected to field.
- Ben Curran (Zim) scored his maiden century in ODIs.

== T20I series ==
=== 1st T20I ===
22 February 2025
13:30
Scorecard

Zimbabwe; 77/5 (9 overs)	v	Ireland
Ryan Burl 36 (18); Joshua Little 2/8 (2 overs)

No result
Harare Sports Club, Harare
Umpires: Langton Rusere (Zim) and Percival Sizara (Zim)

- Ireland won the toss and elected to field.
- The match was reduced to 9 overs per side due to rain.
- Rain prevented any further play.

=== 2nd T20I ===
23 February 2025
13:30
Scorecard

Ireland; 137/8 (20 overs)	v	Zimbabwe; 141/7 (19.2 overs)
Lorcan Tucker 46 (40); Trevor Gwandu 3/24 (4 overs)		Tony Munyonga 43* (30); Craig Young 4/24 (4 overs)

Zimbabwe won by 3 wickets
Harare Sports Club, Harare
Umpires: Iknow Chabi (Zim) and Forster Mutizwa (Zim)
Player of the match: Tony Munyonga (Zim)

- Zimbabwe won the toss and elected to field.

=== 3rd T20I ===
25 February 2025
18:30 (N)
Scorecard

Zimbabwe; 142/6 (18 overs)	v	Ireland
Sikandar Raza 34 (27); Gareth Delany 2/5 (1 over)

No result
Harare Sports Club, Harare
Umpires: Forster Mutizwa (Zim) and Langton Rusere (Zim)

- Ireland won the toss and elected to field.
- The match was reduced to 18 overs per side due to rain and wet outfield.
- Rain prevented any further play.
- Tim Tector (Ire) made his T20I debut.
