= Zimbabwean cricket team in Ireland in 2024 =

International cricket tour

| | Ireland | Zimbabwe |
- Dates: 25 – 28 July 2024
| Captains | Andrew Balbirnie | Craig Ervine |

Test series
- Result: Ireland won the 1-match series 1–0
| Most runs | Andy McBrine (83) | Prince Masvaure (86) |
| Most wickets | Andy McBrine (7) | Blessing Muzarabani (5) |

The Zimbabwe cricket team toured Ireland in July 2024 to play the Ireland cricket team. The tour consisted of one Test match, which was the first such match between the two teams and the first Test played at Stormont cricket ground in Belfast. Ireland won the match.

== Squads ==
| Ireland | Zimbabwe |
|---|---|
| Andrew Balbirnie (c); Mark Adair; Curtis Campher; Gavin Hoey; Graham Hume; Matthew Humphreys; Andy McBrine; Barry McCarthy; James McCollum; PJ Moor (wk); Paul Stirling; Harry Tector; Lorcan Tucker (wk); Craig Young | Craig Ervine (c); Brian Bennett; Johnathan Campbell; Tendai Chatara; Tanaka Chivanga; Joylord Gumbie (wk); Roy Kaia; Clive Madande (wk); Wellington Masakadza; Prince Masvaure; Blessing Muzarabani; Dion Myers; Richard Ngarava; Victor Nyauchi; Sean Williams |

== Only Test ==
25–28 July 2024
Scorecard

| Zimbabwe | v | Ireland |
| 210 (71.3 overs); Prince Masvaure 74 (152); Andy McBrine 3/37 (13 overs) | | 250 (58.3 overs); PJ Moor 79 (105); Tanaka Chivanga 3/39 (10 overs) |
| 197 (71 overs); Dion Myers 40 (65); Andy McBrine 4/38 (23 overs) | | 158/6 (36.1 overs); Lorcan Tucker 56 (64); Richard Ngarava 4/53 (11 overs) |

Ireland won by 4 wickets
Stormont Cricket Ground, Belfast
Umpires: Richard Kettleborough (Eng) and Sharfuddoula (Ban)
Player of the match: Andy McBrine (Ire)

- Ireland won the toss and elected to field.
- This was the first Test to be played at this venue.
- Brian Bennett, Joylord Gumbie and Clive Madande (Zim) all made their Test debuts.
