= List of Ireland cricket captains =

This is a list of all cricketers who have captained Ireland in an official international match. This includes the ICC Trophy, Under-19 games and One Day Internationals, Twenty20 Internationals. The tables are correct as of the February 2012.

== Men's cricket ==
=== Test match captains ===
This is a list of cricketers who have captained the Ireland cricket team for at least one Test match.

A cricketer who has a symbol of next to a Test match series describes their role as captain and their participation in at least one game for the team.

Irish Test match captains
Number	Name	Picture	Year	Report	Opposition	Location	Played	Won	Lost	Drawn
1	William Porterfield		2018	Report	Pakistan	Ireland	1	0	1	0
1	William Porterfield		2018–19	Report	Afghanistan	India	1	0	1	0
1	William Porterfield		2019	Report	England	England	1	0	1	0
1	William Porterfield		Total				3	0	3	0
2	Andrew Balbirnie		2022–23	Report	Bangladesh	Bangladesh	1	0	1	0
2	Andrew Balbirnie		2023	Report	Sri Lanka	Sri Lanka	2	0	2	0
2	Andrew Balbirnie		2023	Report	England	England	1	0	1	0
2	Andrew Balbirnie		2023–24	Report	Afghanistan	UAE	1	1	0	0
2	Andrew Balbirnie		2024	Report	Zimbabwe	Ireland	1	1	0	0
2	Andrew Balbirnie		2024–25	Report	Zimbabwe	Zimbabwe	1	1	0	0
2	Andrew Balbirnie		2025–26	Report	Bangladesh	Bangladesh	2	0	2	0
2	Andrew Balbirnie		Total				9	3	6	0
Grand total							12	3	9	0

=== One Day International captains ===
In 2006, all-rounder Trent Johnston became Ireland's first ODI captain. He stepped down as captain in early 2008 and took a break from cricket as he was struggling with injury problems. William Porterfield succeeded Johnston as Ireland's full-time captain in April 2008. On occasions when Porterfield had been unavailable, sometimes due to commitments with his county side, Kyle McCallan had filled the role of captain. Andrew Balbirnie stood down from the White Ball cricket captain, continuing as Ireland's Test Captain, and Paul Stirling was named captain on 31st October 2023. The table of results is complete up to the West Indies tour in 2025.

Irish ODI captains
Number	Name	Period of captaincy	Played	Won	Tied	Lost	No result
1	Trent Johnston	2006–2010	32	14	1	15	2
2	Kyle McCallan	2007–2008	4	0	0	4	0
3	William Porterfield	2008-2019	113	50	2	55	6
4	Kevin O'Brien	2010–2014	4	3	0	1	0
5	Andrew Balbirnie	2020–2023	37	8	0	25	4
6	Paul Stirling	2022–2025	20	8	0	8	4
Grand total			210	83	3	108	16

=== Twenty20 International captains ===
This is a list of cricketers who have captained the Ireland cricket team for at least one Twenty20 International. Paul Stirling captained Ireland in 2019 before taking over the role full time in 2023. Stats below include his 2019 stats The table of results is complete up to the 2026 Men's T20 World Cup.

Irish Twenty20 International captains
No.	Name	Period	Played	Won	Tied	Lost	No Result
1	William Porterfield	2005–2007	56	26	0	26	4
2	Kevin O'Brien	2015	4	0	0	2	2
3	Gary Wilson	2016–2019	26	12	1	13	0
4	Paul Stirling	2019–2026	48	20	0	26	2
5	Andrew Balbirnie	2020–2023	52	19	1	31	1
6	Lorcan Tucker	2024–2026	2	1	0	1	0
Grand total			188	78	2	99	9

=== Captains in Men's ICC tournaments ===
Irish captains in ICC Tournaments
Tournament	Name	Format	Played	Won	Lost	Tied/NR	Result	% Win
1994 ICC Trophy	Alan Lewis	50 overs	7	3	4	0	Second round	42.86%
1997 ICC Trophy	Justin Benson	50 overs	10	6	3	1	4th place	66.67%
2001 ICC Trophy	Kyle McCallan / Dekker Curry	50 overs	9	4	5	0	7th place	44.44%
2005 ICC Trophy	Jason Molins / Kyle McCallan	50 overs	7	5	1	1	Runners-up	71.43%
2007 Cricket World Cup	Trent Johnston	50 overs	9	2	6	1	Super 8	22.22%
2009 World Twenty20	William Porterfield	20 overs	5	1	4	0	Super 8	20.00%
2010 World Twenty20	William Porterfield	20 overs	2	0	1	1	Group stage	0.00%
2011 Cricket World Cup	William Porterfield	50 overs	6	2	4	0	Group stage	33.33%
2012 World Twenty20	William Porterfield	20 overs	2	0	1	1	Group stage	0.00%
2014 World Twenty20	William Porterfield	20 overs	3	2	1	0	Group stage	66.67%
2015 Cricket World Cup	William Porterfield	50 overs	6	3	3	0	Group stage	50.00%
2016 World Twenty20	William Porterfield	20 overs	3	0	2	1	Group stage	0.00%
2021 Men's T20 World Cup	Andrew Balbirnie	20 overs	3	1	2	0	Group stage	33.33%
2022 Men's T20 World Cup	Andrew Balbirnie	20 overs	8	3	4	1	Super 12	37.50%
2024 Men's T20 World Cup	Paul Stirling	20 overs	4	0	3	1	Group stage	0.00%
2026 Men's T20 World Cup	Paul Stirling / Lorcan Tucker	20 overs	4	1	2	1	Group stage	25.00%

== Women's cricket ==
=== Women's Test match captains ===
Ireland had played one Test in 2000 against Pakistan at Dublin.

Irish women's Test match captains
Number	Name	Year	Opposition	Location	Played	Won	Lost	Drawn
1	Miriam Grealey	2000	Pakistan	Ireland	1	1	0	0
1	Miriam Grealey	Total			1	1	0	0

=== Women's One Day International captains ===
Irish women's ODI captains
Number	Name	Period of captaincy	Played	Won	Tied	Lost	No result
1	Mary-Pat Moore	1987–1993	21	5	0	16	0
2	Sonia Reamsbottom	1988	1	0	0	1	0
3	Elizabeth Owens	1989–1990	9	3	0	6	0
4	Miriam Grealey	1995–2000	33	11	0	21	1
5	Nikki Squire	2001	6	3	0	3	0
6	Anne Linehan	2002	5	0	0	4	1
7	Clare Shillington	2003–2011	15	5	0	9	1
8	Heather Whelan	2003–2011	15	7	0	8	0
9	Isobel Joyce	2008–2014	17	2	0	14	1
10	Ciara Metcalfe	2010–2011	7	2	0	4	1
11	Mary Waldron	2013–2017	2	0	0	2	0
12	Laura Delany	2016–2024	39	11	1	25	2
13	Gaby Lewis	2022–2025	23	6	0	17	0
14	Orla Prendergast	2024	2	1	0	1	0
Grand total			195	56	1	131	7

=== Women's Twenty20 International captains ===
Irish women's Twenty20 International captains
Number	Name	Period of captaincy	Played	Won	Tied	Lost	No result
1	Isobel Joyce	2008–2016	31	5	0	26	0
2	Heather Whelan	2009	4	2	0	2	0
3	Ciara Metcalfe	2010–2011	4	1	0	3	0
4	Cecelia Joyce	2012	1	0	0	1	0
5	Clare Shillington	2014	1	0	0	1	0
6	Laura Delany	2016–2024	77	42	0	34	1
7	Kim Garth	2019	2	0	0	2	0
8	Gaby Lewis	2022–2026	28	20	0	8	0
9	Arlene Kelly	2025	1	1	0	0	0
Grand total			149	71	0	77	1

== Youth cricket ==
=== Youth One-Day International captains ===
Ireland T20I Captains
No.	Name	Year	Played	Won	Tied	Lost	NR
1	Joseph Clinton	1998	5	1	0	4	0
2	Ed Joyce	1998	1	0	0	1	0
3	Peter Shields	1998	7	2	0	4	1
4	William Porterfield	2004	7	3	0	4	0
5	Eoin Morgan	2006	6	2	0	4	0
6	Greg Thompson	2008	6	2	0	4	0
7	Andrew Balbirnie	2010	5	2	0	3	0
8	George Dockrell	2012	6	2	0	4	0
Overall			43	14	1	28	0

== Notes ==
^{A} Percentage is worked out by counting tied games as half a win and excluding no results from the equation.
