= Irish cricket team against Afghanistan in the UAE in 2020–21 =

International cricket tour

Ireland against Afghanistan in the UAE in 2020–21
	Afghanistan	Ireland
- Dates: 21 – 26 January 2021
Captains	Asghar Afghan	Andrew Balbirnie

One Day International series
- Results: Afghanistan won the 3-match series 3–0
Most runs	Rahmanullah Gurbaz (180)	Paul Stirling (285)
Most wickets	Naveen-ul-Haq (8)	Andy McBrine (6)
- Player of the series: Paul Stirling (Ire)

The Ireland cricket team toured the United Arab Emirates in January 2021 to play three One Day International (ODI) matches against Afghanistan. The ODI series formed part of the inaugural 2020–2023 ICC Cricket World Cup Super League. All of the matches were played at the Sheikh Zayed Cricket Stadium in Abu Dhabi.

The Afghanistan team's visa applications for travel to the UAE were delayed, resulting in the Afghanistan Cricket Board (ACB) making contingency plans for the series to be played in Oman. However, on 5 January 2021, the ACB confirmed that the team would be travelling to the UAE per the original schedule. The start of the series was moved back three days from the original schedule, due to the visa issues and a ten-day quarantine period in place in the UAE.

In the opening match, debutant Rahmanullah Gurbaz scored 127 runs to help Afghanistan win by 16 runs. In the second match, Rahmat Shah scored a century, with Afghanistan winning by seven wickets to take an unassailable lead in the series. Afghanistan won the third ODI by 36 runs, to win the series 3–0.

== Squads ==
ODIs
Afghanistan	Ireland
Asghar Afghan (c); Rashid Khan (vc); Javed Ahmadi; Yamin Ahmadzai; Sharafuddin Ashraf; Usman Ghani; Mohammad Nabi; Gulbadin Naib; Rahmanullah Gurbaz (wk); Azmatullah Omarzai; Rahmat Shah; Hashmatullah Shahidi; Sayed Shirzad; Naveen-ul-Haq; Mujeeb Ur Rahman; Najibullah Zadran	Andrew Balbirnie (c); Paul Stirling (vc); Mark Adair; Curtis Campher; ~~David Delany~~; Gareth Delany; Shane Getkate; Josh Little; Andy McBrine; Barry McCarthy; James McCollum; Kevin O'Brien; Conor Olphert; Neil Rock (wk); Simi Singh; Harry Tector; Lorcan Tucker (wk); Craig Young

David Delany was ruled out of the series due to a knee injury, with Josh Little joining Ireland's squad. Little was originally named in the team, but had to self-isolate after a positive COVID-19 result from a close contact. Rashid Khan, Mohammad Nabi and Mujeeb Ur Rahman were all playing in the Big Bash League in Australia, before leaving the tournament to join the rest of the Afghanistan squad. On 11 January 2021, Shane Getkate was added to Ireland's squad, as a replacement for David Delany, and Conor Olphert was added to their squad as a net bowler.

== Tour match ==
Ahead of the ODI series, the two teams played in unofficial warm-up match, with Afghanistan winning by 23 runs.

16 January 2021
Scorecard

Afghanistan; 264 (44.1 overs)	v	Ireland; 241 (44.4 overs)
Hashmatullah Shahidi 61 (75); Curtis Campher 3/31 (5.1 overs)		Harry Tector 42 (53); Sayed Shirzad 3/28 (7 overs)

Afghanistan won by 23 runs
Sheikh Zayed Cricket Stadium, Abu Dhabi

- Ireland won the toss and elected to field.
- The match was reduced to 45 overs per side.

== ODI series ==
=== 1st ODI ===
21 January 2021
10:00
Scorecard

Afghanistan; 287/9 (50 overs)	v	Ireland; 271/9 (50 overs)
Rahmanullah Gurbaz 127 (127); Andy McBrine 5/29 (10 overs)		Lorcan Tucker 83 (96); Naveen-ul-Haq 3/68 (9 overs)

Afghanistan won by 16 runs
Sheikh Zayed Cricket Stadium, Abu Dhabi
Umpires: Ahmed Shah Durrani (Afg) and Ahmed Shah Pakteen (Afg)
Player of the match: Rahmanullah Gurbaz (Afg)

- Afghanistan won the toss and elected to bat.
- Rahmanullah Gurbaz and Azmatullah Omarzai (Afg) both made their ODI debuts.
- Andy McBrine (Ire) took his 50th wicket and his first five-wicket haul in ODIs.
- Rahmanullah Gurbaz became the first batsman for Afghanistan to score a century on their ODI debut.
- World Cup Super League points: Afghanistan 10, Ireland 0.

=== 2nd ODI ===
24 January 2021
10:00
Scorecard

Ireland; 259/9 (50 overs)	v	Afghanistan; 260/3 (45.2 overs)
Paul Stirling 128 (132); Naveen-ul-Haq 4/42 (10 overs)		Rahmat Shah 103* (109); Curtis Campher 1/28 (4 overs)

Afghanistan won by 7 wickets
Sheikh Zayed Cricket Stadium, Abu Dhabi
Umpires: Izatullah Safi (Afg) and Bismillah Jan Shinwari (Afg)
Player of the match: Rahmat Shah (Afg)

- Ireland won the toss and elected to bat.
- World Cup Super League points: Afghanistan 10, Ireland 0.

=== 3rd ODI ===
26 January 2021
10:00
Scorecard

Afghanistan; 266/9 (50 overs)	v	Ireland; 230 (47.1 overs)
Rashid Khan 48 (40); Simi Singh 3/37 (10 overs)		Paul Stirling 118 (119); Rashid Khan 4/29 (9 overs)

Afghanistan won by 36 runs
Sheikh Zayed Cricket Stadium, Abu Dhabi
Umpires: Ahmed Shah Durrani (Afg) and Ahmed Shah Pakteen (Afg)
Player of the match: Rashid Khan (Afg)

- Ireland won the toss and elected to field.
- Paul Stirling scored his 12th century, the most by a cricketer for Ireland in ODIs.
- World Cup Super League points: Afghanistan 10, Ireland 0.
