= Irish cricket team in Sri Lanka in 2022–23 =

International cricket tour

	Sri Lanka	Ireland
- Dates: 16 – 28 April 2023
Captains	Dimuth Karunaratne	Andrew Balbirnie

Test series
- Result: Sri Lanka won the 2-match series 2–0
Most runs	Kusal Mendis (385)	Harry Tector (179)
Most wickets	Prabath Jayasuriya (17)	Curtis Campher (3)
- Player of the series: Kusal Mendis (SL)

The Ireland cricket team toured Sri Lanka in April 2023 to play two Test matches. This was Ireland's first ever Test series consisting of more than a single match.

Initially, Ireland were scheduled to play a Test match along with two One Day International (ODI) matches. In March 2023, following a request from Sri Lanka Cricket, the schedule was changed to include a second Test instead of the two ODI matches.

Sri Lanka defeated Ireland in a one-sided contest in the first Test match. Sri Lanka also won the second test and claimed the series 2–0.

== Squads ==
Sri Lanka	Ireland
Dimuth Karunaratne (c); Dinesh Chandimal; Dhananjaya de Silva; Lasith Embuldeniya; Asitha Fernando; Vishwa Fernando; Dushan Hemantha; Prabath Jayasuriya; Nishan Madushka (wk); Angelo Mathews; Kamindu Mendis; Kusal Mendis; Ramesh Mendis; Milan Rathnayake; Sadeera Samarawickrama (wk)	Andrew Balbirnie (c); Mark Adair; Curtis Campher; Murray Commins; George Dockrell; Fionn Hand; Graham Hume; Matthew Humphreys; Thomas Mayes; Andy McBrine; James McCollum; PJ Moor; Paul Stirling; Harry Tector; Lorcan Tucker (wk); Ben White

Paul Stirling was selected in the Ireland's Test squad only for the second Test.

== Test series ==
=== 1st Test ===
16–20 April 2023 (Note: While five days of play were scheduled for each Test, the first test reached a result in three days.)
Scorecard

Sri Lanka	v	Ireland
591/6d (131 overs); Dimuth Karunaratne 179 (235); Curtis Campher 2/84 (21 overs)		143 (52.3 overs); Lorcan Tucker 45 (73); Prabath Jayasuriya 7/52 (23 overs)
		168 (54.1 overs) (f/o); Harry Tector 42 (95); Ramesh Mendis 4/76 (20 overs)

Sri Lanka won by an innings and 280 runs
Galle International Stadium, Galle
Umpires: Kumar Dharmasena (SL) and Adrian Holdstock (SA)
Player of the match: Prabath Jayasuriya (SL)

- Sri Lanka won the toss and elected to bat.
- Sadeera Samarawickrama (SL) scored his first century in Tests.
- Sadeera Samarawickrama also achieved the highest score by a Sri Lankan player while batting at number 8 or lower in Tests.
- This was Sri Lanka's biggest win by an innings in terms of runs.

=== 2nd Test ===
24–28 April 2023
Scorecard

Ireland	v	Sri Lanka
492 (145.3 overs); Curtis Campher 111 (229); Prabath Jayasuriya 5/174 (58.3 overs)		704/3d (151 overs); Kusal Mendis 245 (291); Graham Hume 1/87 (22 overs)
202 (77.3 overs); Harry Tector 85 (189); Ramesh Mendis 5/64 (27 overs)

Sri Lanka won by an innings and 10 runs
Galle International Stadium, Galle
Umpires: Kumar Dharmasena (SL) and Paul Reiffel (Aus)
Player of the match: Prabath Jayasuriya (SL)

- Ireland won the toss and elected to bat.
- 13.5 overs of play was lost on day 2 due to bad light.
- 31.1 overs of play was lost on day 3 due to rain.
- Matthew Humphreys (Ire) made his Test debut.
- The 115-run stand between Andy Balbirnie and Paul Stirling in the first innings of the match was the highest partnership for Ireland in Tests, in terms of runs.
- Paul Stirling, Curtis Campher (Ire) and Nishan Madushka (SL) all scored their first centuries in Tests.
- Paul Stirling also became the second Irish cricketer to score a century in all three international formats.
- Ireland's total in the first innings of the match was their highest innings total in Tests (492).
- Nishan Madushka and Kusal Mendis (SL) both scored their maiden double century in Tests.
- Prabath Jayasuriya (SL) became the quickest spinner to take 50 wickets, in terms of number of tests played (7).
- This was Sri Lanka's 100th Test win in their history.
