= Irish cricket team in Bangladesh in 2022–23 =

International cricket tour

	Bangladesh	Ireland
- Dates: 18 March – 8 April 2023
Captains	Shakib Al Hasan (Test & T20Is); Tamim Iqbal (ODIs)	Andrew Balbirnie (Test & ODIs); Paul Stirling (T20Is)

Test series
- Result: Bangladesh won the 1-match series 1–0
Most runs	Mushfiqur Rahim (177)	Lorcan Tucker (145)
Most wickets	Taijul Islam (9)	Andy McBrine (7)

One Day International series
- Results: Bangladesh won the 3-match series 2–0
Most runs	Litton Das (146)	Curtis Campher (52)
Most wickets	Ebadot Hossain (6)	Graham Hume (7)
- Player of the series: Mushfiqur Rahim (Ban)

Twenty20 International series
- Results: Bangladesh won the 3-match series 2–1
Most runs	Litton Das (135)	Paul Stirling (94)
Most wickets	Taskin Ahmed (8)	Mark Adair (5)
- Player of the series: Taskin Ahmed (Ban)

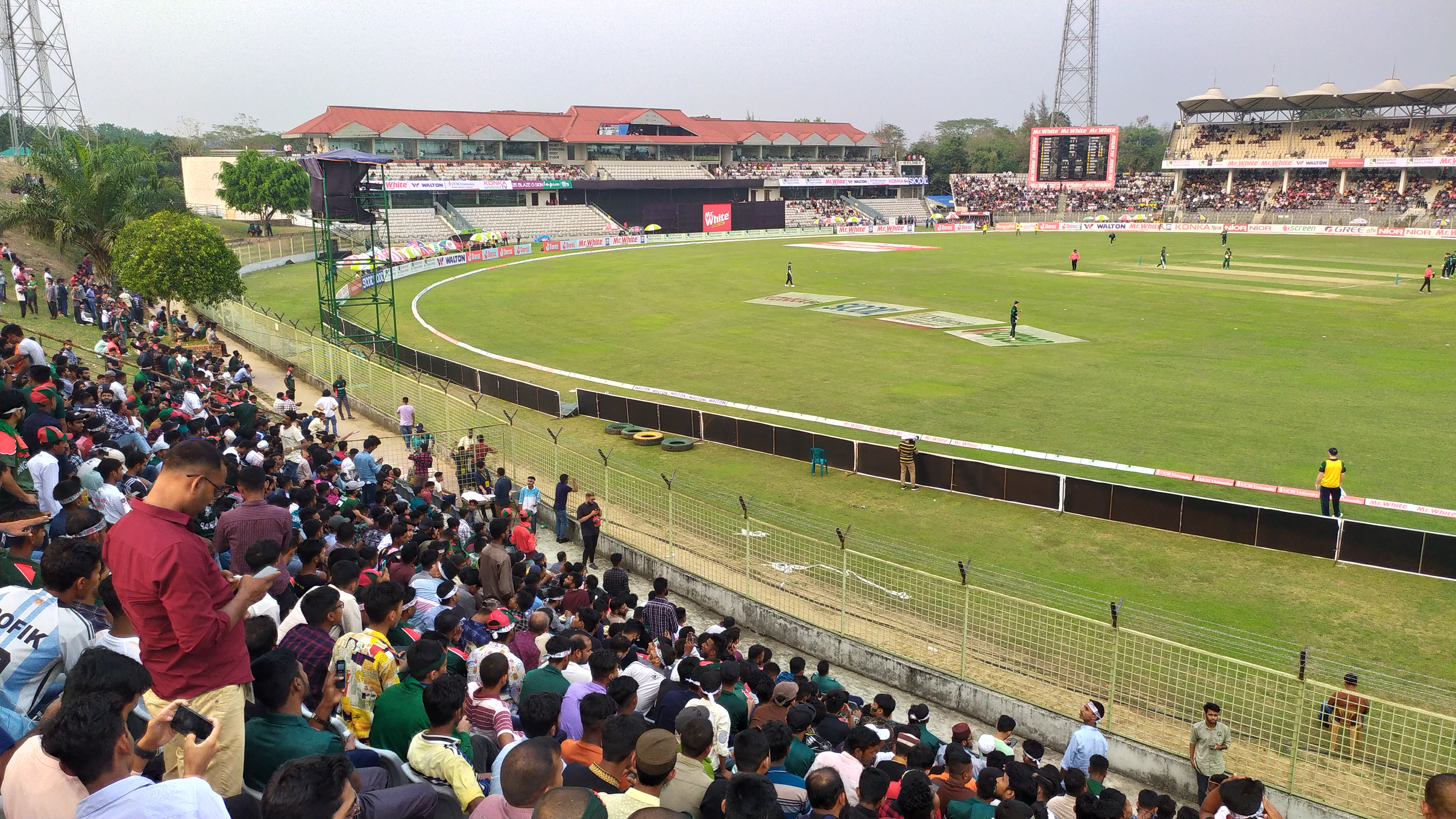
Match between Bangladesh and Ireland at Sylhet International Cricket Stadium during Ireland’s tour of Bangladesh, 18 March 2023

The Ireland men's cricket team toured Bangladesh in March and April 2023 to play one Test, three One Day International (ODI) and three Twenty20 International (T20I) matches.

This was the first-ever Test Match played between the two sides, and the first multi-format series the two sides played at senior level. The Test match was the fourth men's Test in Ireland's history, and their first since July 2019.

The fixtures were confirmed by Cricket Ireland (CI) in January 2023. Ahead of the ODI series, Ireland played a 50-over warm up match against a Bangladesh Cricket Board XI (BCB XI) side.

Bangladesh won the ODI series 2–0, with the second ODI finishing in a no result due to rain, after the Bangladesh's innings.

Bangladesh won the rain-affected first T20I by 22 runs. They also went on to win the second match by 77 runs and take an unassailable lead in the series. Ireland won the third T20I by 7 wickets, with Bangladesh winning the T20I series 2–1.

Bangladesh won the one-off Test by 7 wickets. This was Bangladesh's first Test win on home soil after three years.

== Squads ==
Test		ODIs		T20Is	
Bangladesh	Ireland	Bangladesh	Ireland	Bangladesh	Ireland
Shakib Al Hasan (c); Litton Das (vc, wk); Khaled Ahmed; ~~Taskin Ahmed~~; Mominul Haque; Mehidy Hasan; Mahmudul Hasan Joy; Ebadot Hossain; Tamim Iqbal; Shadman Islam; Shoriful Islam; Taijul Islam; Rejaur Rahman Raja; Mushfiqur Rahim; Najmul Hossain Shanto	Andrew Balbirnie (c); Mark Adair; Curtis Campher; Murray Commins; George Dockrell; Fionn Hand; Graham Hume; Matthew Humphreys; Thomas Mayes; Andy McBrine; ~~Barry McCarthy~~; James McCollum; PJ Moor; Harry Tector; Lorcan Tucker (wk); Ben White	Tamim Iqbal (c); Nasum Ahmed; ~~Taskin Ahmed~~; Yasir Ali; Shakib Al Hasan; Litton Das; Mehidy Hasan; ~~Zakir Hasan~~; Afif Hossain; Ebadot Hossain; Towhid Hridoy; Shoriful Islam; Hasan Mahmud; Mushfiqur Rahim (wk); Mustafizur Rahman; Najmul Hossain Shanto; Rony Talukdar; Mrittunjoy Chowdhury	Andrew Balbirnie (c); Mark Adair; Curtis Campher; Gareth Delany; George Dockrell; Stephen Doheny (wk); Fionn Hand; Graham Hume; Matthew Humphreys; ~~Josh Little~~; Thomas Mayes; Andy McBrine; ~~Barry McCarthy~~; Paul Stirling; Harry Tector; Lorcan Tucker (wk); Ben White	Shakib Al Hasan (c); Nasum Ahmed; Taskin Ahmed; Jaker Ali; Litton Das (wk); Mehidy Hasan; Rishad Hossain; Shamim Hossain; Towhid Hridoy; Shoriful Islam; Hasan Mahmud; Mustafizur Rahman; Najmul Hossain Shanto; Rony Talukdar	Paul Stirling (c); ~~Andrew Balbirnie (c)~~; Lorcan Tucker (vc, wk); Mark Adair; Ross Adair; Curtis Campher; Gareth Delany; George Dockrell; Fionn Hand; Graham Hume; Matthew Humphreys; Thomas Mayes; ~~Barry McCarthy~~; ~~Conor Olphert~~; Harry Tector; Ben White; Craig Young

Former Zimbabwe wicket-keeper PJ Moor was included in Ireland's Test squad for the first time. On 9 March 2023, Ireland's Fionn Hand was added to the Test squad, replacing Josh Little in the ODI squad and replacing Conor Olphert (unavailable due to study commitments) in the T20I squad. On 11 March 2023, Ireland's Barry McCarthy was ruled out of the entire tour due to injury, with Thomas Mayes named as his replacement. On 16 March 2023, Zakir Hasan was ruled out of the ODI series due to a finger injury, with Rony Talukdar named as his replacement. On 21 March 2023, both Afif Hossain and Shoriful Islam were released from the Bangladesh's squad for the third ODI.

On 26 March 2023, Ireland's regular captain Andrew Balbirnie was rested from the T20I series, with Paul Stirling and Lorcan Tucker named captain and vice-captain respectively. On 3 April 2023, Bangladesh's Taskin Ahmed was ruled out of the one-off Test match due to a side strain, with Rejaur Rahman Raja named as his replacement. On 10 April 2023, Mrittunjoy Chowdhury replaced Taskin Ahmed in the ODI series.

== Tour match ==
15 March 2023
09:30
Scorecard

Ireland; 255/7 (40 overs)	v	Bangladesh Cricket Board XI; 181 (32.1 overs)
Curtis Campher 75* (49); Rishad Hossain 2/50 (7 overs)		Soumya Sarkar 48 (46); Andy McBrine 3/12 (4 overs)

Ireland won by 77 runs (DLS method)
Sylhet International Cricket Stadium Academy Ground, Sylhet
Umpires: Ali Arman (Ban) and ATM Ikram (Ban)

- Bangladesh Cricket Board XI won the toss and elected to field.
- The match was reduced to 40 overs per side due to rain. Bangladesh Cricket Board XI were set a revised target of 259 runs in 40 overs.

== ODI series ==
=== 1st ODI ===
18 March 2023
14:00 (D/N)
Scorecard

Bangladesh; 338/8 (50 overs)	v	Ireland; 155 (30.5 overs)
Shakib Al Hasan 93 (89); Graham Hume 4/60 (10 overs)		George Dockrell 45 (47); Ebadot Hossain 4/42 (6.5 overs)

Bangladesh won by 183 runs
Sylhet International Cricket Stadium, Sylhet
Umpires: Tanvir Ahmed (Ban) and Rod Tucker (Aus)
Player of the match: Towhid Hridoy (Ban)

- Ireland won the toss and elected to field.
- Towhid Hridoy (Ban) made his ODI debut.
- Shakib Al Hasan (Ban) became the third cricketer to achieve the double of 7,000 runs and 300 wickets in ODIs.
- Towhid Hridoy's score of 92 was the highest individual score by a Bangladeshi player on his ODI debut.
- This was Bangladesh's highest total in ODIs.
- This was Bangladesh's largest victory in terms of runs in ODIs.

=== 2nd ODI ===
20 March 2023
14:00 (D/N)
Scorecard

Bangladesh; 349/6 (50 overs)	v	Ireland
Mushfiqur Rahim 100* (60); Graham Hume 3/58 (10 overs)

No result
Sylhet International Cricket Stadium, Sylhet
Umpires: Sharfuddoula (Ban) and Rod Tucker (Aus)

- Ireland won the toss and elected to field.
- No further play was possible due to rain.
- Matthew Humphreys (Ire) made his ODI debut.
- Tamim Iqbal became the first Bangladeshi cricketer to score 15,000 runs in international cricket.
- Litton Das became the joint-fastest batter for Bangladesh to score 2000 runs in ODIs, in terms of innings (65).
- Mushfiqur Rahim became the third cricketer from Bangladesh to score 7,000 runs in ODIs.
- Mushfiqur Rahim scored the fastest century by a Bangladeshi player, in terms of the number of balls faced in an ODI (60).
- This was Bangladesh's highest total in ODIs.

=== 3rd ODI ===
23 March 2023
14:30 (D/N)
Scorecard

Ireland; 101 (28.1 overs)	v	Bangladesh; 102/0 (13.1 overs)
Curtis Campher 36 (48); Hasan Mahmud 5/32 (8.1 overs)		Litton Das 50* (38)

Bangladesh won by 10 wickets
Sylhet International Cricket Stadium, Sylhet
Umpires: Masudur Rahman (Ban) and Rod Tucker (Aus)
Player of the match: Hasan Mahmud (Ban)

- Ireland won the toss and elected to bat.
- Hasan Mahmud (Ban) took his first five-wicket haul in ODIs.
- This was the first time that the pacers took all 10 wickets in an innings for Bangladesh in any format of international cricket.
- This was the first time Bangladesh won a match by 10 wickets in any format of international cricket.

== T20I series ==
=== 1st T20I ===
27 March 2023
14:00
Scorecard

Bangladesh; 207/5 (19.2 overs)	v	Ireland; 81/5 (8 overs)
Rony Talukdar 67 (38); Craig Young 2/45 (4 overs)		Gareth Delany 21* (14); Taskin Ahmed 4/16 (2 overs)

Bangladesh won by 22 runs (DLS method)
Zohur Ahmed Chowdhury Stadium, Chittagong
Umpires: Masudur Rahman (Ban) and Gazi Sohel (Ban)
Player of the match: Rony Talukdar (Ban)

- Ireland won the toss and elected to field.
- Ireland were set a revised target of 104 runs from 8 overs due to rain.
- Bangladesh scored 81 runs in their first 6 overs, which was Bangladesh's highest score in powerplay in T20Is.

=== 2nd T20I ===
29 March 2023
14:00
Scorecard

Bangladesh; 202/3 (17 overs)	v	Ireland; 125/9 (17 overs)
Litton Das 83 (41); Ben White 2/28 (4 overs)		Curtis Campher 50 (30); Shakib Al Hasan 5/22 (4 overs)

Bangladesh won by 77 runs
Zohur Ahmed Chowdhury Stadium, Chittagong
Umpires: Tanvir Ahmed (Ban) and Sharfuddoula (Ban)
Player of the match: Shakib Al Hasan (Ban)

- Ireland won the toss and elected to field.
- The match was reduced to 17 overs per side due to rain.
- Litton Das scored the fastest fifty by any Bangladeshi cricketer, in terms of number of balls faced in a T20I (18).
- Bangladesh team reached their 100 in 7.1 overs and 200 in 16.5 overs, the fastest for them, in T20Is.
- The 124-run stand between Litton Das and Rony Talukdar was the highest first wicket partnership for Bangladesh in T20Is.
- Shakib Al Hasan (Ban) became the highest wicket-taker in T20Is (136).
- This was Bangladesh's biggest victory, in terms of runs, against Ireland.
- Shakib Al Hasan became the first cricketer to take a five-wicket haul and score above 30 runs in a T20I match twice in his career.

=== 3rd T20I ===
31 March 2023
14:00
Scorecard

Bangladesh; 124 (19.2 overs)	v	Ireland; 126/3 (14 overs)
Shamim Hossain 51 (42); Mark Adair 3/13 (3 overs)		Paul Stirling 77 (41); Rishad Hossain 1/19 (3 overs)

Ireland won by 7 wickets
Zohur Ahmed Chowdhury Stadium, Chittagong
Umpires: Sharfuddoula (Ban) and Gazi Sohel (Ban)
Player of the match: Paul Stirling (Ire)

- Bangladesh won the toss and elected to bat.
- Rishad Hossain (Ban) and Matthew Humphreys (Ire) both made their T20I debuts.
- Matthew Humphreys became the first bowler for Ireland to take a wicket with his first delivery in T20I career.
- This was Ireland's first win in international cricket against Bangladesh in Bangladesh.

== Only Test ==
4–8 April 2023 (Note: While five days of play were scheduled for this Test, the test reached a result in four days.)
Scorecard

Ireland	v	Bangladesh
214 (77.2 overs); Harry Tector 50 (92); Taijul Islam 5/58 (28 overs)		369 (80.3 overs); Mushfiqur Rahim 126 (166); Andy McBrine 6/118 (28 overs)
292 (116 overs); Lorcan Tucker 108 (162); Taijul Islam 4/90 (42 overs)		138/3 (27.1 overs); Mushfiqur Rahim 51* (48); Mark Adair 1/30 (6 overs)

Bangladesh won by 7 wickets
Sher-e-Bangla National Cricket Stadium, Mirpur
Umpires: Aleem Dar (Pak) and Sharfuddoula (Ban)
Player of the match: Mushfiqur Rahim (Ban)

- Ireland won the toss and elected to bat.
- Curtis Campher, Murray Commins, Graham Hume, Harry Tector, Lorcan Tucker and Ben White (Ire) all made their Test debuts.
- PJ Moor also made his Test debut for Ireland, after previously playing 8 Tests for Zimbabwe, becoming the 17th cricketer to represent two international teams in Tests.
- Harry Tector became the first player for Ireland to score a half-century in the first innings on Test debut.
- Andy McBrine (Ire) took his first five-wicket haul in Tests.
- Andy McBrine also achieved the best bowling figures in an innings by an Irish cricketer in Tests (6 for 118).
- Lorcan Tucker (Ire) scored his first century in Tests.
- Lorcan Tucker also became the first Irish player to score an away Test century, and the second Irish batsman to score a century in Tests.
