= Spencer Magodo =

Zimbabwean cricketer

Cricket information
- Batting: Right-handed
- Bowling: Right-arm leg break

Domestic team information
- Years: Team
- 2021–present: Mountaineers
- Source: Cricinfo, 31 December 2024

Spencer Magodo is a Zimbabwean cricketer.

== Career ==
He made his List A debut for Mountaineers against Southern Rocks on 24 April 2021 during the 2020–21 Pro50 Championship. He made his T20 debut for Mountaineers against Mid West Rhinos on 27 March 2022 during the 2021–22 Zimbabwe Domestic Twenty20 Competition. He made his first-class debut for Mountaineers against Mid West Rhinos on 24 November 2022 during the 2022–23 Logan Cup.

During a first-class fixture between Mountaineers against Mashonaland Eagles during the 2022–23 Logan Cup on 11 December 2022, Magodo was ruled out retired hurt after a blow to his head in the second innings of Mountaineers. Brian Bennett was announced as a concussion substitute for Spencer Magodo and Bennett walked out to bat at number five position during Mountaineers's second innings, which also paved way for Bennett to make his first-class debut.
