= Brian Bennett (cricketer) =

Zimbabwean cricketer (born 2003)

Personal information
- Full name: Brian John Bennett
- Born: 10 November 2003 (age 23); Harare, Zimbabwe
- Batting: Right-handed
- Bowling: Right-arm off break
- Role: All-rounder

International information
- National side: Zimbabwe (2023–present)
- Test debut (cap 127): 25 July 2024 v Ireland
- Last Test: 28 June 2026 v Bangladesh
- ODI debut (cap 157): 24 November 2024 v Pakistan
- Last ODI: 19 October 2026 v Afghanistan
- T20I debut (cap 75): 7 December 2023 v Ireland
- Last T20I: 6 September 2026 v South Africa

Domestic team information
- Years: Team
- 2022–present: Mountaineers
- 2026-: Peshawar Zalmi

Career statistics
Competition	Test	ODI	T20I	FC
Matches	12	19	69	27
Runs scored	568	480	2,129	1,492
Batting average	31.55	25.26	33.79	38.25
100s/50s	2/3	1/0	1/12	4/8
Top score	139	169	111	264*
Balls bowled	528	74	182	1,254
Wickets	6	1	9	17
Bowling average	55.83	88.00	29.00	49.35
5 wickets in innings	1	0	0	1
10 wickets in match	0	0	0	0
Best bowling	5/95	1/13	2/8	5/95
Catches/stumpings	20/–	7/–	23/–	33/–
Medal record
Representing Zimbabwe
Men's Cricket
African Games
Gold medal – first place	2023 Accra	Team
- Source: Cricinfo, 20 September 2026

Brian John Bennett (born 10 November 2003) is a Zimbabwean International cricketer who plays for Zimbabwe in all formats of the game. His twin brother David Bennett is also a professional cricketer.

== Early life ==
Brian Bennett was born in Harare, Zimbabwe, the son of Kelly Bennett, a blueberry farmer. He is a twin, with his brother David Bennett. Both brothers attended Peterhouse Boys’ School in Marondera, the alma mater of cricketers such as Gary Ballance and Ryan Burl. During their school years, Peterhouse regularly participated in a cricket festival hosted by Kingswood College in South Africa. Following their graduation, their father arranged for them to spend a bridging year at Kingswood College, where they received further cricket training.

== Career ==
Bennett was included alongside his twin brother David in Zimbabwe national under-19 cricket team for the 2022 Under-19 Men's Cricket World Cup. In fact, Bennett was appointed as the vice-captain of the Zimbabwean squad ahead of the 2022 Under-19 Cricket World Cup. He had a prolific tournament with the bat, where he ended up the 2022 edition of the Under-19 World Cup on a higher note in batting perspective as Zimbabwe's top runscorer with an aggregate of 273 runs in across six matches, including of three half-centuries and his runs came at an healthy average of 45.50, with a strike rate of 84.52 and he also picked up four wickets in the tournament. His emergence in youth level caught the eyes of the selectors and within a space of ten months, he earned his maiden call-up to join the senior domestic set up in order to play top-flight first-class cricket matches.

He made his first-class debut for Mountaineers against Mashonaland Eagles in the 2022–23 Logan Cup on 11 December 2022. His first-class debut was itself came under the serendipitous circumstance, as he was announced as a concussion substitute for Spencer Magodo and Bennett walked out to bat at number five position during Mountaineers's second innings. Magodo was ruled out retired hurt after a blow to his head in the second innings of Mountaineers during the fixture between Mountaineers and Eagles on 11 December 2022. He made his T20 debut for Mountaineers against Lions on 20 February 2023 during the 2022–23 Zimbabwe Domestic Twenty20 Competition. He made his List A debut for Mountaineers against Southern Rocks on 27 October 2023 during the 2023–24 Pro50 Championship.

Bennett got his first international call up during the Irish tour of Zimbabwe in 2023–24 and made his T20I debut during the three match T20I series on 7 December 2023. On 18 January 2024, he scored 29 runs off 12 balls against Sri Lanka in the third and final T20I match of the three-match T20I series, where he signalled his first real intent of scoring and he announced his arrival to international cricket, but during the same match rest of the Zimbabwean batters faltered to make an impact and Zimbabwe were bowled out for 82 runs. in February 2024, he received spotlight and widespread attention from cricketing fraternity after his unbeaten knock of 264 against Mashonaland Eagles during the 2023–24 Logan Cup and his innings came in a run-a-ball fashion facing only 259 deliveries and his knock included 33 fours and three sixes. In March 2024, he was included in Zimbabwe's contingent for the 2023 African Games and he represented Zimbabwe Emerging Team in the men's cricket tournament at the 2023 African Games. Zimbabwe eventually claimed gold medal in the African Games cricket tournament defeating Namibia by 8 wickets in the final.

In July 2024, he received his maiden call-up to join Zimbabwe's Test squad for their one-off test match against Ireland. He eventually made his Test debut on 25 July 2024 against Ireland. In November 2024, he was included in Zimbabwe's ODI and T20I squads to face-off Pakistan. He made his ODI debut on 24 November 2024 against Pakistan.

In December 2024, during first match of the two-match Test series between Zimbabwe and Afghanistan in Bulawayo, Bennett notched up his maiden Test century. During the process, he became the second youngest Zimbabwean to score a Test century after Hamilton Masakadza at the age of 21 and it was only Bennett's second Test match appearance. He eventually ended up unbeaten on 110 off just 124 deliveries as Zimbabwe also registered their highest Test team total of 586 and his innings included five fours and four sixes. Later in the same match he took his first Test match five-wicket haul, recording figures of 5/95.

Bennett compiled his maiden ODI century scoring 169 off 163 balls in Zimbabwe's 49 run win over Ireland at the Harare Sports Club on 14 February 2025 becoming only the second Brian to make that score after his West Indian namesake made that score against Sri Lanka

On 13 February 2026, he scored 64* off 56 in T20 World Cup match against Australia to help Zimbabwe secure a historic 23-run victory.

On 26 February 2026, he scored 97* off 59 against India in a losing effort.
