= Murray Commins =

South African cricketer (born 1997)

Personal information
- Born: 2 January 1997 (age 29); Cape Town, Western Cape, South Africa
- Batting: Left-handed
- Bowling: Right-arm medium
- Role: Batter
- Relatives: John Commins (father); Kevin Commins (grandfather)

International information
- National side: Ireland
- Test debut (cap 19): 4 April 2023 v Bangladesh
- Last Test: 16 April 2023 v Sri Lanka
- ODI debut (cap 65): 21 January 2023 v Zimbabwe
- Last ODI: 23 January 2023 v Zimbabwe

Domestic team information
- Years: Team
- 2016/17–2017/18: South Western Districts
- 2017/18–2018/19: Boland
- 2019: Northern Knights
- 2021–2023: Munster Reds

Career statistics
Competition	Test	ODI	FC	LA
Matches	2	2	16	28
Runs scored	6	6	554	973
Batting average	1.50	6.00	19.78	42.30
100s/50s	0/0	0/0	0/5	3/5
Top score	5	6	93	125
Catches/stumpings	2/–	1/–	13/–	19/–
- Source: ESPNcricinfo, 24 November 2023

Murray Commins (born 2 January 1997) is a South African-born Irish cricketer. He made his first-class debut for South Western Districts in the 2016–17 Sunfoil 3-Day Cup on 13 October 2016. He made his List A debut for South Western Districts in the 2016–17 CSA Provincial One-Day Challenge on 16 October 2016. He made his Twenty20 debut for South Western Districts in the 2017 Africa T20 Cup on 25 August 2017.

Since 2019, Commins has played domestic cricket in Ireland. Ahead of the 2021 season, Commins signed with Munster Reds.

== International career ==
Commins made his ODI debut against Zimbabwe on 21 January 2023.

He was named in Ireland's Test squad for their tours of Bangladesh in March 2023 and Sri Lanka in April 2023. He made his Test debut for Ireland against Bangladesh, on 4 April 2023.
