= Matthew Humphreys (cricketer) =

Irish cricketer

Personal information
- Full name: Matthew James Humphreys
- Born: 28 September 2002 (age 24); Belfast, Northern Ireland
- Batting: Right-handed
- Bowling: Slow left-arm orthodox
- Role: Bowler

International information
- National side: Ireland
- Test debut (cap 25): 24 April 2023 v Sri Lanka
- Last Test: 19 November 2025 v Bangladesh
- ODI debut (cap 66): 20 March 2023 v Bangladesh
- Last ODI: 1 November 2026 v Namibia
- T20I debut (cap 58): 31 March 2023 v Bangladesh
- Last T20I: 28 June 2026 v India

Domestic team information
- Years: Team
- 2022–present: Northern Knights
- 2026: Belfast Wolves

Career statistics
Competition	Test	ODI	T20I	FC
Matches	5	8	20	10
Runs scored	67	6	14	112
Batting average	11.16	6.00	2.80	10.18
100s/50s	0/0	0/0	0/0	0/0
Top score	27*	4*	7	27*
Balls bowled	997	350	449	1,710
Wickets	15	4	29	32
Bowling average	37.13	77.75	18.27	30.84
5 wickets in innings	2	0	0	4
10 wickets in match	0	0	0	1
Best bowling	6/57	2/48	4/13	6/57
Catches/stumpings	5/–	1/–	5/–	6/–
- Source: Cricinfo, 1 November 2026

Matthew James Humphreys (born 28 September 2002) is a Northern Irish cricketer who represents the Ireland cricket team. He plays for the Northern Knights in Irish domestic cricket.

== Domestic career ==
A product of Lisburn Cricket Club, Humphreys played age-level cricket in Northern Ireland, captaining a Belfast under-14 side in 2017.

Having played a pivotal part in helping the Ireland Under-19 team to qualify for the 2022 ICC Under-19 Cricket World Cup in the West Indies, he was subsequently named in the Ireland under-19 squad for the World Cup, where he played in six matches during the tournament and took 11 wickets.

He was named by Cricket Ireland in the core Northern Knights squad for the 2022 season. He made his debut in a List A match against the Munster Reds at Stormont in the 2022 Inter-Provincial Cup, where he took the wickets of Ireland internationals Kevin O'Brien and David Delany.

Later in the season he made his Twenty20 debut against the North West Warriors in the 2022 Inter-Provincial Trophy festival at Comber.

He was retained by the Knights for the 2023 season. During a T20 match against North West Warriors on 1 August he took career best figures of 5/13. The Knights side would go on to complete an Irish domestic double with Humphreys taking 15 wickets.

== International career ==
Despite having not played first-class cricket, Humphreys was named in Ireland's Test squad for their tours of Bangladesh in March 2023 and Sri Lanka in April 2023. He was also named in the T20I and ODI squads for the tours.

He was awarded a casual contract by Cricket Ireland in March 2023 and would go on to make his ODI debut for Ireland against Bangladesh, on 20 March 2023.

Later on the Bangladesh tour he made his T20I debut on 31 March 2023 where he became the first bowler for Ireland to take a wicket with his first delivery in T20I career.

He made his Test debut for Ireland, against Sri Lanka, on 24 April 2023, going wicketless in ten overs.

Humphreys was included in the 2023 Emerging Ireland tour of the West Indies where he struggled, taking 3 wickets across four innings.
