= Andy McBrine =

Irish cricketer

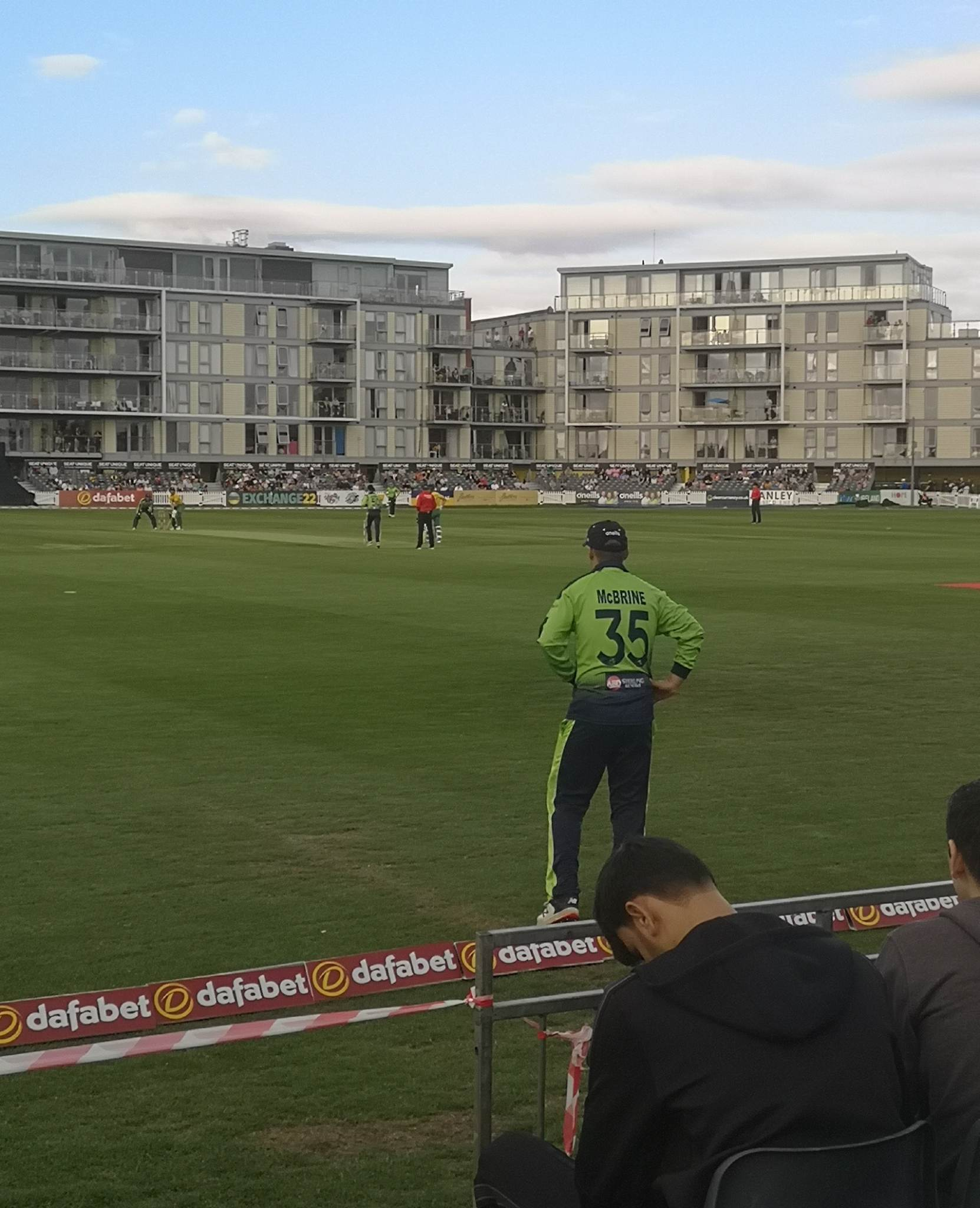
- Andy McBrine playing for Ireland in 2022

Personal information
- Full name: Andrew Robert McBrine
- Born: 30 April 1993 (age 33); Derry, Northern Ireland
- Batting: Left-handed
- Bowling: Right-arm off break
- Role: Bowler
- Relatives: Alexander McBrine (father), James McBrine (uncle)

International information
- National side: Ireland (2014–present)
- Test debut (cap 14): 15 March 2019 v Afghanistan
- Last Test: 27 May 2026 v New Zealand
- ODI debut (cap 44): 8 September 2014 v Scotland
- Last ODI: 27 October 2026 v Namibia
- ODI shirt no.: 35
- T20I debut (cap 28): 17 March 2014 v Zimbabwe
- Last T20I: 11 August 2022 v Afghanistan
- T20I shirt no.: 35

Domestic team information
- Years: Team
- 2013–present: North West Warriors

Career statistics
Competition	Test	ODI	FC	LA
Matches	12	99	32	154
Runs scored	667	965	1,446	2,422
Batting average	35.10	18.55	33.62	24.22
100s/50s	0/6	0/2	0/13	3/8
Top score	90*	79	90*	117
Balls bowled	2,560	4,667	5,158	7,026
Wickets	34	93	68	139
Bowling average	43.38	38.47	40.17	37.85
5 wickets in innings	2	1	2	1
10 wickets in match	0	0	0	0
Best bowling	6/109	5/29	6/109	5/29
Catches/stumpings	2/–	36/–	23/–	59/–
- Source: Cricinfo, 1 November 2026

Andrew Robert McBrine (born 30 April 1993) is a Northern Irish cricketer. He is a left-handed batsman who bowls right-arm off spin. McBrine is the son of Alexander McBrine and the nephew of James McBrine, both of whom also played cricket for Ireland.

== Domestic career ==
In January 2014, he was named in Ireland's squad for the 2013–14 Regional Super50. He made his List A debut for Ireland on 31 January 2014, against Guyana.

In July 2019, he was selected to play for the Belfast Titans in the inaugural edition of the Euro T20 Slam cricket tournament. However, the following month the tournament was cancelled.

McBrine plays for the North West Warriors in provincial cricket. In May 2022, in the 2022 Inter-Provincial Cup, he scored his first century in a List A cricket match, with 100 runs against Munster Reds.

== International career ==
On 26 May 2013, McBrine made his first-class debut for Ireland against Scotland. He made his One Day International debut against Scotland in September 2014.

In May 2018, he was named in a fourteen-man squad for Ireland's first Test match, to be played against Pakistan later the same month, but he was not selected to play.

In December 2018, he was one of nineteen players to be awarded a central contract by Cricket Ireland for the 2019 season. In January 2019, he was named in Ireland's squad for their one-off Test against Afghanistan in India. He made his Test debut for Ireland against Afghanistan on 15 March 2019.

In January 2020, he was one of nineteen players to be awarded a central contract from Cricket Ireland, the first year in which all contracts were awarded on a full-time basis. On 10 July 2020, McBrine was named in Ireland's 21-man squad to travel to England to start training behind closed doors for the ODI series against the England cricket team.

On 21 January 2021, in the opening match against Afghanistan, McBrine took his 50th wicket and his first five-wicket haul in ODI cricket. In September 2021, McBrine was named in Ireland's provisional squad for the 2021 ICC Men's T20 World Cup. In February 2022, in the final match of the 2021–22 Oman Quadrangular Series, McBrine played in his 100th international match for Ireland.

In February 2023, he was named in Ireland's Test squad for their series against Bangladesh. On 5 April 2023, in the second innings of the only Test, he took his maiden five-wicket haul in Test cricket and became the second Irish cricketer to claim a fifer in Tests. His figures of 6 for 118 was also the best bowling figures in an innings by an Irish player in Tests.
