= Fionn Hand =

Irish cricketer (born 1998)

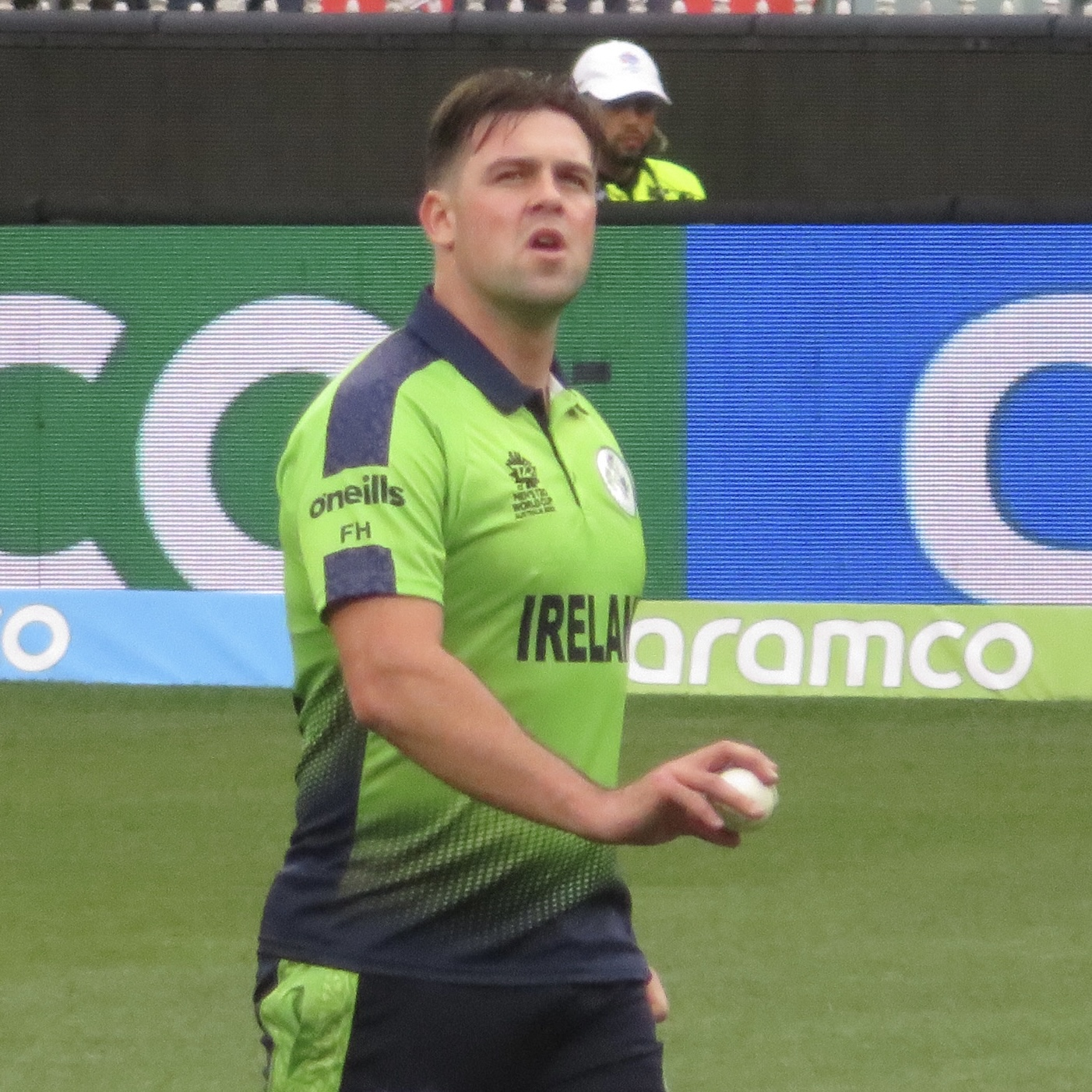

Personal information
- Full name: Fionn Philip Hand
- Born: 1 July 1998 (age 28); Dublin, Ireland
- Batting: Right-handed
- Bowling: Right-arm medium

International information
- National side: Ireland
- Only Test (cap 26): 1 June 2023 v England
- Only ODI (cap 70): 7 October 2024 v South Africa
- T20I debut (cap 54): 12 August 2022 v Afghanistan
- Last T20I: 25 February 2025 v Zimbabwe

Domestic team information
- Years: Team
- 2018–2019: Leinster Lightning
- 2021–2022: Munster Reds
- 2023: Leinster Lightning

Career statistics
Competition	Test	ODI	T20I	FC
Matches	1	1	14	7
Runs scored	8	0	63	206
Batting average	4.00	0.00	9.00	29.42
100s/50s	0/0	0/0	0/0	0/0
Top score	7	0	36	79
Balls bowled	114	48	164	636
Wickets	1	1	7	6
Bowling average	113.00	44.00	38.85	72.33
5 wickets in innings	0	0	0	0
10 wickets in match	0	0	0	0
Best bowling	1/113	1/44	3/18	2/50
Catches/stumpings	1/–	0/–	3/–	3/–
- Source: Cricinfo, 26 May 2025

Fionn Philip Hand (born 1 July 1998) is an Irish cricketer. He made his Twenty20 debut for Leinster Lightning in the 2018 Inter-Provincial Trophy on 6 July 2018. He made his List A debut for Leinster Lightning in the 2019 Inter-Provincial Cup on 23 May 2019. In June 2019, he was named in the Ireland Wolves squad for their home series against the Scotland A cricket team. He made his first-class debut for Leinster Lightning in the 2019 Inter-Provincial Championship on 18 June 2019.

== International career ==
In July 2022, Hand was added to Ireland's Twenty20 International (T20I) squad for their home series against New Zealand. Later the same month, Hand was also named in Ireland's T20I squads for their matches against South Africa in Bristol, and for their home series against Afghanistan. He made his T20I debut on 12 August 2022, against Afghanistan.

In September 2022, he was named in Ireland's squad for the 2022 ICC Men's T20 World Cup tournament in the Australia, where he bowled Ben Stokes with what was widely believed to be the ball of the tournament.

In May 2023, he was named in Ireland's Test squad for their series against England. He made his Test debut for Ireland against England on 1 June 2023.
