= PJ Moor =

Zimbabwean-Irish cricketer (born 1991)

Personal information
- Full name: Peter Joseph Moor
- Born: 2 February 1991 (age 35); Harare, Zimbabwe
- Batting: Right-handed
- Bowling: Right-arm off break
- Role: Wicket-keeper batsman
- Relatives: Anthony Moor (brother)

International information
- National sides: Zimbabwe (2014–2019); Ireland (2023–2025)
- Test debut (cap 99/21): 6 August 2016; Zimbabwe v New Zealand
- Last Test: 6 February 2025; Ireland v Zimbabwe
- ODI debut (cap 124): 26 November 2014; Zimbabwe v Bangladesh
- Last ODI: 1 July 2019; Zimbabwe v Ireland
- ODI shirt no.: 10 (formerly 63)
- T20I debut (cap 44): 8 January 2016; Zimbabwe v Afghanistan
- Last T20I: 3 October 2019; Zimbabwe v Singapore
- T20I shirt no.: 10 (formerly 63)

Domestic team information
- Years: Team
- 2008/09: Northerns
- 2010/11–2012/13: Mashonaland Eagles
- 2012/13–2017/18: Mid West Rhinos
- 2021–2024: Munster Reds
- 2020/21: Matabeleland Tuskers
- 2021/22–2023/24: Mountaineers

Career statistics
Competition	Test	ODI	FC	LA
Matches	15	49	84	157
Runs scored	734	827	4,815	3,408
Batting average	25.31	20.67	32.97	26.21
100s/50s	0/6	0/4	7/28	3/18
Top score	83	58*	157	152
Catches/stumpings	12/1	22/1	86/4	105/9
- Source: Cricinfo, 10 February 2025

Peter Joseph Moor (born 2 February 1991) is an international cricketer. Born in Zimbabwe and of Irish descent, he has played for both nations as a wicket-keeper batsman. He is a former vice-captain for the Zimbabwe men's cricket team and a current opening batsman for the Ireland men's cricket team in Test cricket.

Moor holds an Irish passport and had begun the path to qualifying for Ireland's national team in early 2021. In June 2022, Moor was selected in an Ireland Development XI to play a four-day game against Gloucestershire 2nd XI. On 4 April 2023, Moor made his international debut for Ireland.

== Education ==
He pursued his education at St. John's College in Harare for which he also holds the highest individual score of unbeaten 214.

== Domestic career ==
He found his range and mojo during the 2013-14 season when he joined the Mid West Rhinos where he was guided and mentored by former Zimbabwean international and opening batsman Grant Flower. He subsequently found success with Mid West Rhinos by emerging as one of the top ten run scorers during the.2013–14 Pro50 Championship. Following his impressive run at the 2013-14 Pro50 Championship, he was picked up in the Zimbabwean squad to face Bangladesh in a five match ODI series which began in November 2014.

In 2017, he was given full membership of the Marylebone Cricket Club after having met the playing requirements, graduating from a probationer since 2015. He was later named in the Marylebone Cricket Club squad for the 2018 MCC Tri-Nation Series where Nepal and the Netherlands played.

In December 2020, he was selected to play for the Tuskers in the 2020–21 Logan Cup. In April 2021, Cricket Ireland confirmed that Moor would be playing domestic cricket for Munster Reds during the summer of 2021. He replaced the injured Tyrone Kane as the captain of Munster Reds for the remainder of the 2021 Inter-Provincial Twenty20 Trophy.

During the Irish winter, he returned to native Zimbabwe and played in the 2021-22 Pro50 Championship where he scored enough runs for him to be one of the top ten runscorers during the competition with 217 runs coming in 7 matches. He also played a crucial role in helping Mountaineers to claim the 2021–22 Pro50 Championship title where Mountaineers defeated Mashonaland Eagles in the final by 71 runs. He propelled Mountaineers total to 307/9 in 50 overs batting first in the final with a quickfire knock of 76 in 58 deliveries.

In May 2022, in the third match of the 2022 Inter-Provincial Cup, Moor scored 152 runs against the Leinster Lightning, the highest individual score in the Inter-Provincial Cup.

== International career ==
=== Zimbabwe career ===
He also represented Zimbabwe at the 2008 Under-19 Cricket World Cup and also at the 2010 Under-19 Cricket World Cup.

He made his One Day International (ODI) debut for Zimbabwe against Bangladesh on 26 November 2014. He made his Twenty20 International debut for Zimbabwe against Afghanistan on 8 January 2016. He was named in Zimbabwean squad for the 2016 ICC World Twenty20.

In July 2016, he was named in Zimbabwe's Test squad for their series against New Zealand. He made his Test debut in the second Test on 6 August 2016.

In June 2018, he was named in a Board XI team for warm-up fixtures ahead of the 2018 Zimbabwe Tri-Nation Series. He was also part of the Zimbabwean squad which played at the 2018 Cricket World Cup Qualifier which was held in Zimbabwe where the hosts missed out on qualification by a whisker.

In February 2019, Zimbabwe Cricket confirmed that Moor would be the vice-captain of the national side across all three formats for the 2019–20 season.

His last international competitive match while representing Zimbabwe eventually came in October 2019 when he featured in a T20I match against Singapore during the final of the 2019–20 Singapore Tri-Nation Series which Zimbabwe eventually won by 8 wickets in a dazzling run chase of 168. He also registered his highest individual score in T20I career during his final appearance in Zimbabwe colours in that match by smashing an unbeaten 92 off just 60 deliveries ending up in a player of the match performance.

==== Captaincy ====
In April 2019, he was named captain of Zimbabwe's ODI team for their series against the United Arab Emirates, after their regular captain, Hamilton Masakadza, was ruled out of the tour due to injury.

=== Ireland career ===
In October 2019, he relocated to Dublin and joined the Clontarf Cricket Club in pursuit of better career prospects in cricket.

Moor became eligible to play for Ireland in October 2022. In February 2023, Moor was named in the Irish Test squads for their tour of Bangladesh and Sri Lanka. He made his Test debut for Ireland against Bangladesh on 4 April 2023, after previously playing 8 Tests for Zimbabwe, becoming the 17th cricketer to represent two international teams in Tests.

He made his Ireland debut during the only Test of Ireland's tour of Bangladesh in April 2023 and it also marked his first return to international cricket in nearly four years since October 2019. He became the first Test cricketer to move away from Zimbabwe and to play for another country while John Traicos and Gary Ballance did the other way around having previously played for South Africa and England respectively before returning to play for Zimbabwe at international level.
