= Lorcan Tucker =

Irish cricketer (born 1996)

Personal information
- Full name: Lorcan John Tucker
- Born: 10 September 1996 (age 30); Dublin, Leinster, Ireland
- Batting: Right-handed
- Role: Wicket-keeper, batsmen

International information
- National side: Ireland (2016–present)
- Test debut (cap 23): 4 April 2023 v Bangladesh
- Last Test: 27 May 2026 v New Zealand
- ODI debut (cap 57): 3 May 2019 v England
- Last ODI: 1 November 2026 v Namibia
- ODI shirt no.: 3
- T20I debut (cap 40): 5 September 2016 v Hong Kong
- Last T20I: 28 June 2026 v India
- T20I shirt no.: 3

Domestic team information
- Years: Team
- 2015–present: Leinster Lightning
- 2023: MI Emirates
- 2023: Trinbago Knight Riders
- 2024: Lahore Qalanders
- 2026: Gulf Giants
- 2026: Belfast Wolves

Career statistics
Competition	Test	ODI	T20I	FC
Matches	10	67	93	28
Runs scored	753	1,196	1,795	1,416
Batting average	41.83	23.45	23.01	37.26
100s/50s	1/5	0/5	0/12	2/9
Top score	108	85	94*	125*
Catches/stumpings	23/2	84/4	63/11	65/8
- Source: Cricinfo, 1 November 2026

Lorcan John Tucker (born 10 September 1996) is an Irish cricketer and wicket-keeper batter.

He was part of Ireland's squad for the 2016 Under-19 Cricket World Cup and made his international debut for the Ireland cricket team in September 2016. He currently plays for MI Emirates in the ILT20. In January 2020, he was one of nineteen players to be awarded a central contract from Cricket Ireland, the first year in which all contracts were awarded on a full-time basis. In 2022 he was awarded a further two-year contract.

== Biography ==
His father Barry Tucker was also a cricketer who is currently serving as the Chair of Pembroke Cricket Club in Dublin. Barry also played for the said club during his playing days. His brothers Donncha Tucker and Fiachra Tucker are also cricketers.

He also incidentally played alongside Fiachra during the 2016 Under-19 Cricket World Cup where he played a crucial knock of 57 in a losing cause during a group stage match against eventual runners-up India, his knock received attention from the then Indian Under-19 head coach and former Indian cricketer Rahul Dravid.

== Domestic and T20 career ==
Tucker made his List A debut for Leinster Lightning in the 2017 Inter-Provincial Cup on 4 June 2017. He made his first-class debut for Leinster Lightning in the 2017 Inter-Provincial Championship on 5 June 2017. In April 2019, he was one of five cricketers to be awarded with an Emerging Player Contract by Cricket Ireland, ahead of the 2019 domestic season.

In July 2019, Tucker was selected to play for the Dublin Chiefs in the inaugural edition of the Euro T20 Slam cricket tournament. However, the following month, the tournament was cancelled.

In December 2022, he was signed by MI Emirates to play in the inaugural season on the International League T20 franchise league based in the UAE. He made his debut on 29 January against Desert Vipers. Tucker made 85 runs from 4 innings in the tournament at a strike rate of 120.

He was one of six Irish players who signed up to play at the 2022 USA T20 Open.

In June 2023, Tucker was signed by the Colombo Strikers for the 2023 edition of the Lanka Premier League, however he did not play in the competition. He was also signed by the Trinbago Knight Riders for the 2023 Caribbean Premier League, featuring in seven matches.

== International career ==
=== Early career ===
Tucker made his Twenty20 International (T20I) debut against Hong Kong on 5 September 2016. In January 2017, he was called up as a replacement for the injured Stuart Thompson for Ireland's squad in the 2017 Desert T20 Challenge.

In January 2019, Tucker was named in Ireland's T20I squad for the Oman Quadrangular Series. At the same time, he was also named in Ireland's Test, One Day International (ODI) and T20I squads for their series against Afghanistan in India, but he did not play during the tour.

In April 2019, he was named in Ireland's ODI squads for the one-off match against England and the 2019 Ireland Tri-Nation Series. He made his ODI debut for Ireland against England on 3 May 2019.

In June 2019, Tucker was named in the Ireland Wolves squad for their home series against the Scotland A cricket team.

In July 2019, he made his first international fifty for Ireland in the 2nd ODI of Zimbabwe's tour of Ireland. Tucker made 56(51) to help Ireland to win by 5 runs. Later that month he was named in Ireland's Test squad for their one-off match against England at Lord's, but he did not play.

In September 2019, Tucker was named in Ireland's squad for the 2019 ICC T20 World Cup Qualifier tournament in the United Arab Emirates. He played one match in the tournament but did not bat.

On 10 July 2020, Tucker was named in Ireland's 21-man squad to travel to England to start training behind closed doors for the ODI series against the England cricket team. Tucker did not play in the series as after a poor run of form he had been replaced by Neil Rock as first-choice wicketkeeper.

In February 2021, Tucker was named in the Ireland Wolves' squad for their tour to Bangladesh. He high scored with 82* in the third unofficial ODI.

In September 2021, Tucker was named in Ireland's provisional squad for the 2021 ICC Men's T20 World Cup. He did not play in the tournament.

=== Breakthrough ===
Tucker made a long-awaited breakthrough in late 2021 as he made 141 runs across two T20Is against the USA in Florida. This included a match winning 84(56) in the second T20I. He had been moved up the order to the number 3 role and his form in T20Is improved.

He would follow this up with scores of 78 (38) against South Africa and 50 (32) against Afghanistan ahead of the 2022 ICC Men's T20 World Cup.

In September 2022, he was named in Ireland's squad for the T20 World Cup. He would have a highly successful tournament of finish as team's top scorer with 204 runs across 7 games. His 45* (35) against West Indies helped Ireland make it through to the Super 12s round. He then made 34 (37) as Ireland famously beat England at the MCG before smashing 71* (48) in defeat to Australia.

In February 2023, Tucker was named in Ireland's Test squad for their tours of Bangladesh in March 2023 and Sri Lanka in April 2023. He was also named in the T20I and ODI squads for the tours. He made his Test debut against Bangladesh, on 4 April 2023, and scored his maiden Test century. He also became the second Irishman to score a century in Tests and Test debut and the first to score an away Test century. He became the sixth wicket-keeper to score a Test century on debut and the first Irish wicket-keeper batter to score a century on debut. He also became only the second wicket-keeper batsman to score Test century on debut in away soil after England's Ben Foakes. He also became the first wicket-keeper batter to score a century in his team's second innings of his debut Test match while the other five keeper batters including Sri Lanka's Brendon Kuruppu, Romesh Kaluwitharana, England's Matt Prior, New Zealand's Tom Blundell and England's Ben Foakes all scored centuries on their debuts in their teams first innings. He also became the second Irish batsman to score a century on Test debut.

In May 2024, with permanent captain Paul Stirling rested, he captained Ireland in the third T20 international against Pakistan, becoming the seventh Irishman to captain the team in T20 internationals. In May 2024, he was named in Ireland's squad for the 2024 ICC Men's T20 World Cup tournament.

During the 1st T20I against India national cricket team on 26 June 2026, Tucker became the first player in T20I history to hit a 50+ score in each of their first 3 innings as captain. His innings of 50 off 36 balls as captain was instrumental in helping Ireland win a match against India for the first time in any form of men's international cricket.
