= Curtis Campher =

South African-Irish cricketer

Personal information
- Born: 20 April 1999 (age 27); Johannesburg, Gauteng, South Africa
- Batting: Right-handed
- Bowling: Right-arm medium-fast
- Role: All-rounder

International information
- National side: Ireland
- Test debut (cap 18): 4 April 2023 v Bangladesh
- Last Test: 27 May 2026 v New Zealand
- ODI debut (cap 60): 30 July 2020 v England
- Last ODI: 1 November 2026 v Namibia
- ODI shirt no.: 85
- T20I debut (cap 50): 27 August 2021 v Zimbabwe
- Last T20I: 14 February 2026 v Oman
- T20I shirt no.: 85

Domestic team information
- Years: Team
- 2020: Leinster Lightning
- 2021–2025: Munster Reds
- 2023–2024: Chattogram Challengers
- 2023: Essex
- 2023: Somerset
- 2024: Gloucestershire
- 2025: Rangpur Riders
- 2025: Multan Sultans
- 2025: Essex
- 2026–present: Leinster Lightning
- 2026: Amsterdam Flames

Career statistics
Competition	Test	ODI	T20I	FC
Matches	10	52	70	15
Runs scored	466	1,554	1,067	681
Batting average	25.88	37.00	20.92	26.19
100s/50s	1/1	2/10	0/4	1/2
Top score	111	120	72*	111
Balls bowled	600	1,444	823	737
Wickets	6	38	32	10
Bowling average	77.50	37.63	35.31	54.80
5 wickets in innings	0	0	0	0
10 wickets in match	0	0	0	0
Best bowling	2/13	4/37	4/25	3/12
Catches/stumpings	3/–	16/–	39/–	4/–
- Source: Cricinfo, 1 November 2026

Curtis Campher (born 20 April 1999) is a South African-born Irish cricketer who plays for the Ireland cricket team and Munster Reds. Campher made his international debut for Ireland in June 2020.

In October 2021, Campher became the first bowler for Ireland to take a hat-trick in a Twenty20 International (T20I) match, going on to take four wickets in four balls, becoming only the third bowler to do so.

In July 2025, in an Inter-Provincial T20 Trophy Munster Reds win over the North West Warriors, he took five wickets in five balls becoming the first male cricketer to do so in a professional game.

== Career ==
Campher has dual citizenship; he held an Irish passport prior to his selection for Ireland, and qualified to play for the Ireland cricket team through his grandmother. He had also played for the South Africa under-19 cricket team in the past.

In February 2020, he was added to the Ireland Wolves team for their tour to Namibia. He made his Twenty20 debut on 21 February 2020, and his List A debut on 26 February 2020, both for Ireland Wolves against Namibia, during their tour to South Africa.

On 10 July 2020, Campher was named in Ireland's 21-man squad to travel to England to start training behind closed doors for the One Day International (ODI) series against the England cricket team. On 28 July 2020, Cricket Ireland named Campher in their 14-man squad for the first ODI of the series. He made his ODI debut for Ireland, against England, on 30 July 2020. Campher top-scored for Ireland in the match with 59 not out, but they went on to lose by six wickets.

In February 2021, Campher was named in the Ireland Wolves' squad for their tour to Bangladesh. Campher made his first-class debut on 26 February 2021, for Ireland Wolves against the Bangladesh Emerging team.

In August 2021, Campher was named in Ireland's Twenty20 International (T20I) squad for their series against Zimbabwe. Campher made his T20I debut on 27 August 2021, for Ireland against Zimbabwe. In September 2021, Campher was named in Ireland's provisional squad for the 2021 ICC Men's T20 World Cup. On 18 October 2021, in Ireland's first match of the T20 World Cup, against the Netherlands, Campher became the first bowler for Ireland to take a hat-trick in T20I cricket. Campher also became the third bowler, after Lasith Malinga and Rashid Khan, to take four wickets in four balls in a T20I match.

He was named in Ireland's Test squad for their tours of Bangladesh in March 2023 and Sri Lanka in April 2023. He was also named in the T20I and ODI squads for the tours. He made his Test debut for Ireland against Bangladesh, on 4 April 2023. On 25 April 2023, he scored his maiden century in Test cricket during the first Test against Sri Lanka, becoming the only fourth Irishman to score a century in the format.

In May 2024, he was named in Ireland's squad for the 2024 ICC Men's T20 World Cup tournament.

Campher signed a short-term deal to play white ball cricket for Gloucestershire in August 2024.

On 10 July 2025, playing for Munster Reds in the Inter-Provincial T20 Trophy against the North-West Warriors, Campher became the first player to take five wickets in five balls in a men's professional match.

In August 2025, Campher signed a short-term contract with Essex to play three matches for the club in the One-Day Cup. He scored 123 not out off 68 balls on his debut against Surrey.
