= Paul Stirling =

Irish cricketer

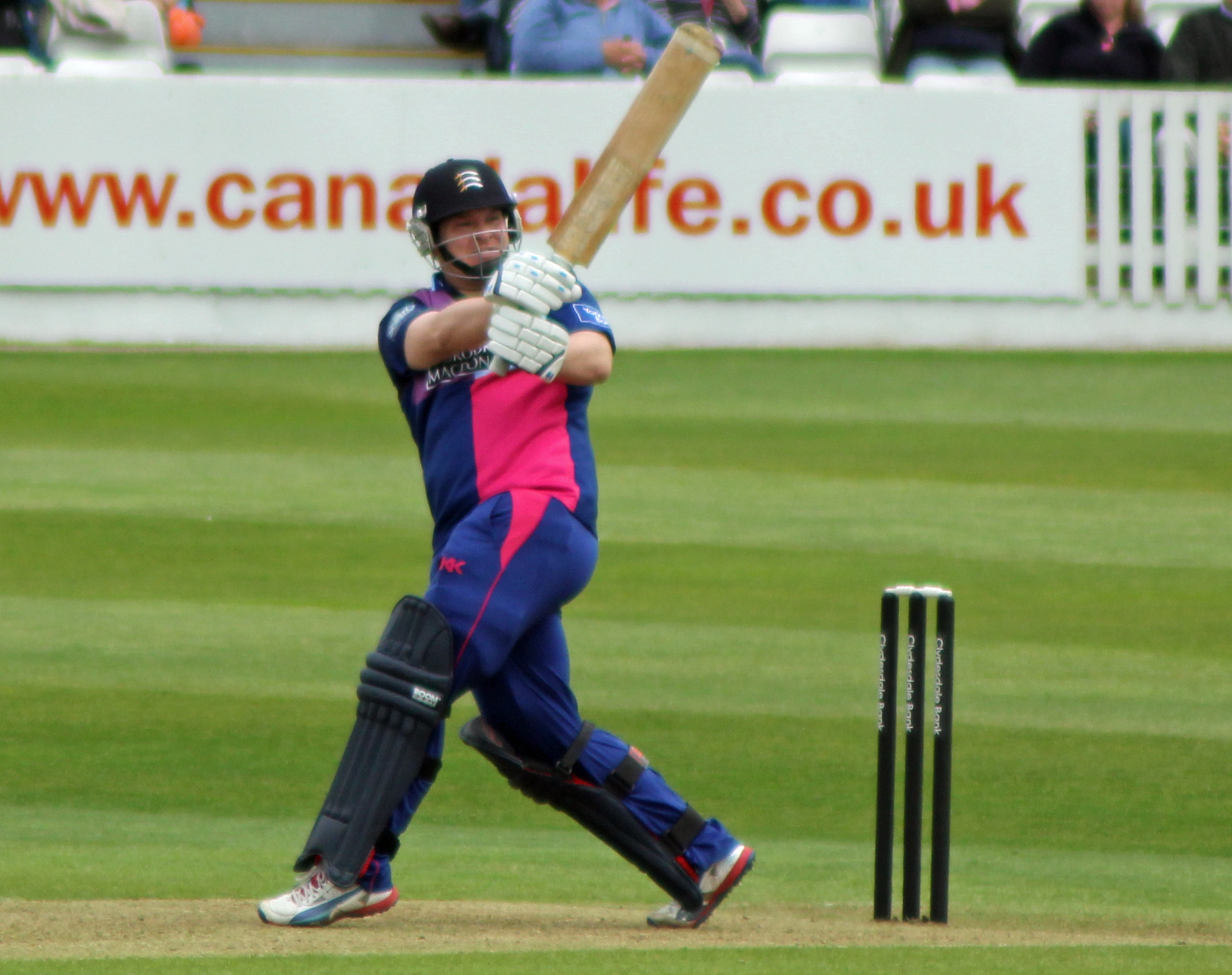
- Stirling in 2013

Personal information
- Full name: Paul Robert Stirling
- Born: 3 September 1990 (age 36); Belfast, Northern Ireland
- Height: 175 cm (5 ft 9 in)
- Batting: Right-handed
- Bowling: Right-arm off break
- Role: Top-order batter

International information
- National side: Ireland (2008–present)
- Test debut (cap 9): 11 May 2018 v Pakistan
- Last Test: 19 November 2025 v Bangladesh
- ODI debut (cap 28): 1 July 2008 v New Zealand
- Last ODI: 27 October 2026 v Namibia
- ODI shirt no.: 1
- T20I debut (cap 16): 15 June 2009 v Pakistan
- Last T20I: 11 February 2026 v Australia
- T20I shirt no.: 1

Domestic team information
- Years: Team
- 2010–2019: Middlesex
- 2013: Sylhet Royals
- 2018: Kandahar Knights
- 2019: Khulna Titans
- 2020–present: Northern Knights
- 2020: Northamptonshire
- 2020: Dambulla Viiking
- 2021–2023: Islamabad United
- 2021: Middlesex
- 2021–2022: Southern Brave
- 2022–2023: Warwickshire
- 2022: Guyana Amazon Warriors
- 2023: Paarl Royals
- 2023: Oval Invincibles
- 2024: Leicestershire
- 2026: Belfast Wolves

Career statistics
Competition	Test	ODI	T20I	FC
Matches	10	177	163	81
Runs scored	521	6,213	3,895	3,578
Batting average	26.05	37.65	26.31	29.32
100s/50s	1/2	14/34	1/24	8/17
Top score	103	177	115*	146
Balls bowled	12	2,441	546	2,338
Wickets	0	43	20	27
Bowling average	–	45.16	33.95	41.40
5 wickets in innings	–	1	0	0
10 wickets in match	–	0	0	0
Best bowling	–	6/55	3/21	2/21
Catches/stumpings	8/–	72/–	44/–	45/–
- Source: ESPNcricinfo, 1 November 2026

Paul Robert Stirling (born 3 September 1990) is an Irish cricketer who represents the Ireland cricket team. Stirling is the opening batsman for Ireland and an occasional right-arm, off-break bowler. He is one of the top 10 run scorers in T20 internationals. He was one of the eleven cricketers to play in Ireland's first ever Test match, against Pakistan, in May 2018. He was appointed as the vice-captain of the Ireland team in June 2020. He subsequently served as interim captain of Ireland in the T20I and ODI format following the resignation of Andrew Balbirnie, before being appointed as permanent limited-overs captain in October 2023.

Stirling debuted in first-class cricket in March 2008, playing for Ireland in the Intercontinental Cup. The same year, Stirling made his debut in One Day Internationals (ODIs). Having represented Middlesex's youth sides and Second XI, Stirling signed a contract with the club in December 2009. A month later he was awarded a contract with Cricket Ireland, making him one of six players with a full-time contract with the board. He made his Twenty20 and List A debuts for Middlesex in 2010 and 2011, respectively.

In December 2018, Stirling was one of nineteen players to be awarded a central contract by Cricket Ireland for the 2019 season. In July 2019, in the second ODI against Zimbabwe, Stirling became the first batsman for Ireland to score 4,000 runs in ODIs. In January 2020, he was one of nineteen players to be awarded a central contract from Cricket Ireland, the first year in which all contracts were awarded on a full-time basis. In August 2021, Stirling played in his 300th match for Ireland, in the opening fixture of Ireland's series against Zimbabwe. In January 2022, Stirling captained Ireland for the first time in ODIs, in the second match against the West Indies, after Andrew Balbirnie was ruled out of the match due to COVID-19. In the same match, Stirling also became the first cricketer for Ireland to score 5,000 runs in ODIs.

== Early career ==
In July 2009, Stirling scored his maiden first-class century. In Ireland's opening match of the 2009–10 ICC Intercontinental Cup, he opened the batting with Jeremy Bray and scored 100 in the first innings. Stirling was a member of the Ireland squad that participated in the 2010 Under-19 World Cup hosted by New Zealand in January. The team were runners-up to Bangladesh in the Plate Championship, finishing tenth overall out of 16 teams. Stirling was the team's leading run-scorer, with 209 from five matches.

== Contracts with Middlesex ==
In December 2009, Stirling signed a three-year contract with Middlesex County Cricket Club, joining former Ireland international Eoin Morgan at the club. According to Angus Fraser, the club's director of cricket, representing Ireland is Stirling's priority; he also stated that "Paul has been involved with the Middlesex youth sides and Second XI and we are delighted that he has now signed a full time contract for the club. His batting for Ireland in 2009 highlighted his potential". The following month Cricket Ireland, the governing body for cricket in Ireland, awarded Stirling a full-time contract. He was one of six players to be awarded such contracts with Cricket Ireland, and came just a year after the first professional contracts were awarded to Ireland's cricketers. Before that players were amateurs relying on income from other jobs and playing cricket in their spare time. The contract allowed Stirling and the others to focus on cricket, with the aim of improving ahead of the 2011 World Cup.

After the 2011 Cricket World Cup, Stirling broke into Middlesex's one-day side during the 2011 season, making his List A debut for the club on 24 April against Worcestershire. Although Middlesex failed to progress beyond the group stages of the 2011 Clydesdale Bank 40, Stirling enjoyed personal success. Scoring 535 runs from 12 matches, he was Middlesex's leading run-scorer and 7th in the competition. During an innings of 68 against Yorkshire, one of Stirling's two half-centuries in the competition, he passed 2,000 runs in List A cricket. Towards the end of the competition Stirling struck his first century in Middlesex colours, scoring 109 runs from 81 balls to a 34-run win over Derbyshire.

Although a full-strength team played against England in an ODI in August 2012, county commitments meant many of Ireland's senior players were unavailable to play in the team's opening match of the 2011–13 Intercontinental Cup. An attacking half-century from Stirling in the final innings of the match helped secure victory for Ireland. Later that same month Stirling scored his second first-class century. His innings of 107, beating his previous highest score of 100, came off just 79 deliveries and helped Ireland to their second win of the Intercontinental Cup.

== Acknowledgment ==
In August 2010, Stirling was nominated in the "Emerging Player of the Year" and "Associate and Affiliate Player of the Year" categories for the ICC Awards. He was the only associate member to be nominated in the "Emerging Player" category, the other 15 players coming from Test-playing countries. Ireland's had most nominees in the "Associate and Affiliate" category, with Trent Johnston and Kevin O'Brien included alongside Stirling. Richard Holdsworth, a representative of the ICC, said "I think it's fantastic for Paul Stirling to be nominated in two separate categories and to be recognised alongside some of the leading emerging players in the Full Members, it proves how far the development of Associate cricket has progressed". He did not make the short list in either category.

In the annual ICC Awards in January 2022, Stirling was included in ICC Men's ODI Team of the Year for the year 2021.

== International career ==
On 7 September 2010, during a One Day International against Canada, Stirling made his maiden List-A century, scoring 177 runs. In doing so, Stirling made the highest individual score for Ireland in a One Day International.

Stirling was selected in Ireland's 15-man squad for the 2011 World Cup. Ireland won two out of six matches, which was not sufficient to progress beyond the group stage, but finished on a high by beating the Netherlands. Chasing 307 to win on a batting friendly wicket, Stirling opened the batting with team captain William Porterfield. The pair shared a partnership of 177 runs, setting a new record for Ireland's first wicket in ODIs. Stirling fell for 101, his century coming off 70 deliveries, which made it the fourth-fastest in World Cup history.

When Ireland's cricketers have been regulars for English counties, demands from country and club have sometimes come into conflict. Despite this, Stirling played in Ireland's two-match ODI series against Pakistan in May. Ireland lost the series 2–0, but in the second match Stirling scored his first century against a Test nation. Stirling's influence on the team was such that, along with all-round Kevin O'Brien, he was one of two Ireland players shortlisted for Associate and Affiliate Player of the Year at the 2011 ICC Awards in August.

A side made up of some of the best players from Associate and Affiliate teams was put together to face England in Dubai in January 2012. The three-day match was part of England's preparation for a series against Pakistan later that month. Stirling was one of four Ireland players included in the 12-man squad.

In the ODI series against Afghanistan he along with Rashid Khan became the first pair of bowlers representing different teams to take 6 wickets a piece in a single ODI match

In February 2018, the International Cricket Council (ICC) named Stirling as one of the ten players to watch ahead of the 2018 Cricket World Cup Qualifier tournament.

In May 2018, he was named in a fourteen-man squad for Ireland's first ever Test match, which was played against Pakistan later the same month. He made his Test debut for Ireland, against Pakistan, on 11 May 2018. He scored 17 runs in the first innings, and became the first Irish batsman to score a boundary in Test cricket. In January 2019, he was named in Ireland's squad for their one-off Test against Afghanistan in India.

In September 2019, he was named in Ireland's squad for the 2019 ICC T20 World Cup Qualifier tournament in the United Arab Emirates. He was the leading run-scorer in the tournament, with 291 runs in eight matches.

In June 2020, he was named as the vice-captain of the Ireland cricket team. On 10 July 2020, Stirling was named in Ireland's 21-man squad to travel to England to start training behind closed doors for the ODI series against the England cricket team. In January 2021, in Ireland's series against Afghanistan, Stirling scored his 12th century, the most by a cricketer for Ireland in ODIs. In September 2021, Stirling was named in Ireland's provisional squad for the 2021 ICC Men's T20 World Cup.

In April 2023, he was named in Ireland's squad for the second Test match against Sri Lanka. On 25 April 2023, he scored his maiden century in Test cricket, and became the second Irishman to score a century in all three international formats. He was also involved in a 115-run stand with Andy Balbirnie in the first innings, recording the highest partnership for Ireland in Tests, in terms of runs.

In May 2024, he was named the captain of the Ireland's squad for the 2024 ICC Men's T20 World Cup tournament.

Stirling became the first Irish player, and 95th from any country, to score 10,000 international runs across all formats when he made 54 against the West Indies in a One Day International at Castle Avenue, Clontarf, on 21 May 2025. Paul Stirling stepped down from T20I captaincy in March 2026

== Franchise career ==
In September 2018, he was named in Kandahar's squad in the first edition of the Afghanistan Premier League tournament. The following month, he was named in Paarl Rocks' squad for the first edition of the Mzansi Super League T20 tournament.

In July 2019, he was selected to play for the Belfast Titans in the inaugural edition of the Euro T20 Slam cricket tournament. However, the following month the tournament was cancelled.

He signed a contract with Northamptonshire for the 2020 Vitality t20 Blast on 31 January 2020. In October 2020, he was drafted by the Dambulla Viiking for the inaugural edition of the Lanka Premier League. In February 2021 Stirling signed to Islamabad United as a replacement player. In December 2021, he was signed by Islamabad United following the players' draft for the 2022 Pakistan Super League. He played the first five games of the PSL for Islamabad United before leaving for international duty with Ireland. He returned to Islamabad United before their eliminator game against Lahore Qalandars.

In the inaugural season of The Hundred, he was signed by the Southern Brave.

In 2023, he played for the Oval Invincibles in the 2023 Final of The Hundred. The Invincibles winning by 14 runs.
