= Harry Tector =

Irish cricketer (born 1999)

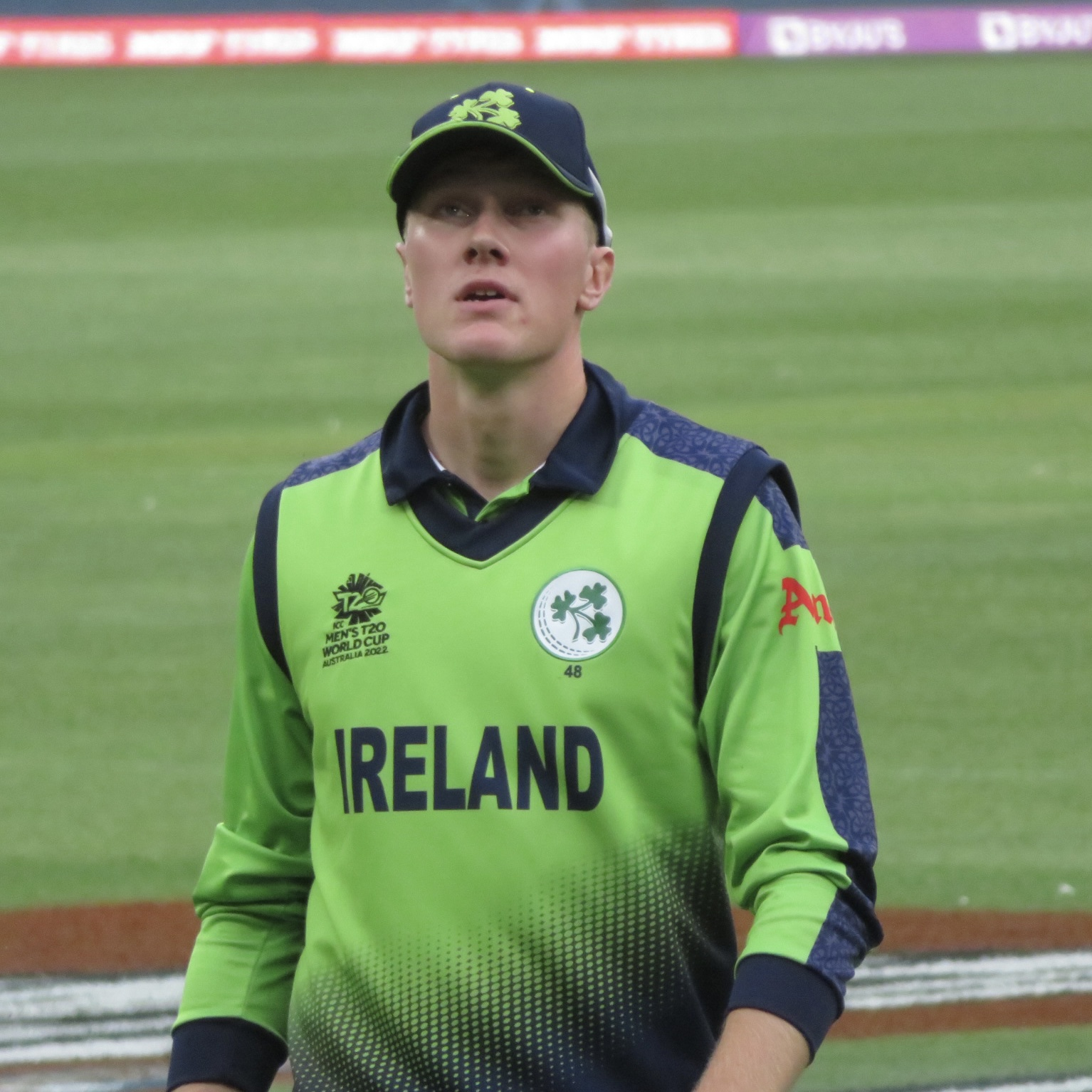
- Tector during the 2022 ICC T20 World Cup

Personal information
- Full name: Harry Tom Tector
- Born: 6 December 1999 (age 26); Dublin, Ireland
- Batting: Right-handed
- Bowling: Right-arm off break
- Role: Middle-order batsman
- Relatives: Jack Tector (brother); Tim Tector (brother); Alice Tector (sister)

International information
- National side: Ireland (2019–present)
- Test debut (cap 22): 4 April 2023 v Bangladesh
- Last Test: 27 May 2026 v New Zealand
- ODI debut (cap 61): 30 July 2020 v England
- Last ODI: 1 November 2026 v Namibia
- ODI shirt no.: 13
- T20I debut (cap 48): 17 September 2019 v Scotland
- Last T20I: 28 June 2026 v India
- T20I shirt no.: 13

Domestic team information
- Years: Team
- 2017: Munster Reds
- 2018–2021: Northern Knights
- 2022–2026: Leinster Lightning
- 2022: Barbados Royals
- 2022: Lumbini All Stars
- 2023: Gloucestershire
- 2024: Sylhet Strikers
- 2026: Dublin Guardians

Career statistics
Competition	Test	ODI	T20I	FC
Matches	10	63	100	25
Runs scored	492	2,174	1,898	954
Batting average	24.60	41.80	24.97	22.71
100s/50s	0/5	5/15	0/9	1/7
Top score	85	140	96*	146
Balls bowled	204	335	258	1,213
Wickets	1	5	12	19
Bowling average	171.00	68.80	25.41	38.36
5 wickets in innings	0	0	0	0
10 wickets in match	0	0	0	0
Best bowling	1/33	1/5	2/17	4/70
Catches/stumpings	5/–	27/–	66/–	11/–
- Source: Cricinfo, 1 November 2026

Harry Tom Tector (born 6 December 1999) is an Irish professional cricketer. He was part of Ireland's squad for the 2016 Under-19 Cricket World Cup. He made his full international debut for the Ireland cricket team in September 2019. In January 2020, he was one of nineteen players to be awarded a central contract from Cricket Ireland, the first year in which all contracts were awarded on a full-time basis.

== Domestic and T20 career ==
Tector made his Twenty20 cricket debut for Munster Reds in the 2017 Inter-Provincial Trophy on 26 May 2017.

Tector made his List A debut for Northern Knights in the 2018 Inter-Provincial Cup on 28 May 2018. He made his first-class debut for Northern Knights in the 2018 Inter-Provincial Championship on 29 May 2018.

In July 2019, Tector was selected to play for the Dublin Chiefs in the inaugural edition of the Euro T20 Slam cricket tournament. Later the same month, batting for the Northern Knights against Leinster Lightning in the 2019 Inter-Provincial Championship, Tector scored his maiden century in first-class cricket.

In March 2021, Tector was named as the new captain of Northern Knights, ahead of the 2021 season.

== International career ==
In December 2017, Tector was named as the captain of Ireland's squad for the 2018 Under-19 Cricket World Cup. Following Ireland's matches in the tournament, the International Cricket Council (ICC) named Tector as the rising star of the squad. He was the leading wicket-taker for Ireland in the tournament, with 8 wickets.

In November 2018, Tector was named the Male Academy Player of the Year at the annual Cricket Ireland Awards. The following month, he was one of nineteen players to be awarded a central contract by Cricket Ireland for the 2019 season.

In January 2019, Tector was named in Ireland's Twenty20 International (T20I) squads for the Oman Quadrangular Series and the series against Afghanistan in India, but he did not play. In June 2019, he was named as the captain of the Ireland Wolves squad for their home series against the Scotland A cricket team. In September 2019, he was named in Ireland's T20I squad for the 2019–20 Ireland Tri-Nation Series. He made his T20I debut for Ireland, against Scotland, on 17 September 2019. Later the same month, he was named in Ireland's squad for the 2019 ICC T20 World Cup Qualifier tournament in the United Arab Emirates. Ahead of the tournament, the International Cricket Council (ICC) named him as the player to watch in Ireland's squad.

On 10 July 2020, Tector was named in Ireland's 21-man squad to travel to England to start training behind closed doors for the One Day International (ODI) series against the England cricket team. On 28 July 2020, Cricket Ireland named Tector in their 14-man squad for the first ODI of the series. He made his ODI debut for Ireland, against England, on 30 July 2020.

In February 2021, Tector was named as the white-ball captain in the Ireland Wolves' squad for their tour to Bangladesh. After George Dockrell withdrew from the tour, Tector was also named as the captain for the red-ball matches for the series. In May 2021, he was named in the Ireland Wolves' squad as the captain for their home series against the Netherlands A. He was the highest run-scorer in the tournament, aggregating 128 runs including two half-centuries. In September 2021, Tector was named in Ireland's provisional squad for the 2021 ICC Men's T20 World Cup.

In July 2022, in the first match of the series against New Zealand, Tector scored his first century in ODI cricket. Tector was named in Ireland's squad for their tours of Bangladesh in March 2023 and Sri Lanka in April 2023. The tour consists of ODI, T20, and Test matches. He made his Test debut against Bangladesh on 4 April 2023. He scored 50 runs in his maiden Test innings, becoming the first Irish player to score a half-century on Test debut.

In May 2024, he was named in Ireland's squad for the 2024 ICC Men's T20 World Cup.

== Personal life ==
He is the cousin of rugby union player Charlie Tector.
