= List of Ireland One Day International cricket records =

One Day International (ODI) cricket is played between international cricket teams who are Full Members of the International Cricket Council (ICC) as well as the top four Associate members. Unlike Test matches, ODIs consist of one inning per team, having a limit in the number of overs, currently 50 overs per innings – although in the past this has been 55 or 60 overs. ODI cricket is List-A cricket, so statistics and records set in ODI matches also count toward List-A records. The earliest match recognised as an ODI was played between England and Australia in January 1971; since when there have been over 5,000 ODIs played by 28 teams. This is a list of Ireland Cricket team's One Day International records. It is based on the List of One Day International cricket records, but concentrates solely on records dealing with the Irish cricket team.

== Key ==
The top five records are listed for each category, except for the team wins, losses, draws and ties, all round records and the partnership records. Tied records for fifth place are also included. Explanations of the general symbols and cricketing terms used in the list are given below. Specific details are provided in each category where appropriate. All records include matches played for Ireland only.

Key
Symbol	Meaning
†	Player or umpire is currently active in ODI cricket
‡	Event took place during a Cricket World Cup
*	Player remained not out or partnership remained unbroken
♠	One Day International cricket record
Date	Starting date of the match
Innings	Number of innings played
Matches	Number of matches played
Opposition	The team India was playing against
Period	The time period when the player was active in ODI cricket
Player	The player involved in the record
Venue	One Day International cricket ground where the match was played

== Team records ==
=== Overall record ===
Matches	Won	Lost	Tied	NR	Win %
219	85	115	3	16	42.61
Last Updated: 7 November 2026

=== Team wins, losses, draws and ties ===
As of November 2026, Ireland has played 219 men's ODI matches resulting in 85 victories, 115 defeats, 3 ties and 16 no results for an overall winning percentage of 42.61.

Opponent	Matches	Won	Lost	Tied	No Result	% Won	First	Last
Full Members
Afghanistan	36	13	22	0	1	37.14	2010	2026
Australia	5	0	4	0	1	0.00	2007	2016
Bangladesh	16	2	11	0	3	12.50	2007	2023
England	15	2	11	0	2	13.33	2006	2023
India	3	0	3	0	0	0.00	2007	2015
New Zealand	7	0	7	0	0	0.00	2007	2022
Pakistan	7	1	5	1	0	21.42	2007	2016
South Africa	11	2	8	0	1	14.28	2007	2021
Sri Lanka	5	0	5	0	0	0.00	2007	2016
West Indies	18	4	12	0	2	25.00	2007	2025
Zimbabwe	25	11	10	1	3	44.00	2007	2025
Associate Members
Bermuda	1	1	0	0	0	100.00	2007	2007
Canada	8	6	2	0	0	75.00	2007	2011
Kenya	10	7	2	0	1	77.77	2007	2012
Namibia	5	2	3	0	0	40.00	2026	2026
Nepal	1	1	0	0	0	0.00	2023	2023
Netherlands	13	8	3	1	1	70.83	2006	2021
Oman	1	0	0	1	0	0.00	2023	2023
Papua New Guinea	1	1	0	0	0	100.00	2018	2018
Scotland	21	15	5	0	1	75.00	2006	2023
United Arab Emirates	9	8	1	0	0	88.88	2015	2023
United States	1	1	0	0	0	100.00	2023	2023
Total	219	85	115	3	16	42.61	2006	2026
Statistics are correct as of Ireland v Namibia at Namibia Cricket Ground, 5th ODI, 1 November 2026.

=== First bilateral ODI series wins ===
Opponent	Year of first Home win	Year of first Away win
Afghanistan	-	2017
Australia	-	YTP
Bangladesh	-	-
Canada	YTP	-
England	-	-
Kenya	2008	-
India	-	YTP
Namibia	YTP	-
Netherlands	2010	-
New Zealand	-	YTP
Pakistan	-	YTP
Scotland	2014	2009
South Africa	-	-
Sri Lanka	-	YTP
United Arab Emirates	YTP	2017
West Indies	-	2022
Zimbabwe	2019	2023
Last updated: 17 December 2023

=== First ODI match wins ===
Opponent	Home		Away / Neutral	
Opponent	Venue	Year	Venue	Year
Afghanistan	Dublin	2011	Rotterdam	2010
Australia	-	-	-	-
Bangladesh	Belfast	2010	Bridgetown	2007
Bermuda	-	-	Nairobi (Jaff)	2007
Canada	Toronto	2010	Amstelveen	2010
England	-	-	Bangalore	2011 ‡
India	-	-	-	-
Kenya	Belfast	2008	Nairobi (Gym)	2008
Namibia	-	-	Windhoek	2026
Nepal	-	-	Harare	2023
Netherlands	Belfast	2007	Amstelveen	2010
New Zealand	-	-	-	-
Pakistan	-	-	Kingston	2007 ‡
Papua New Guinea	-	-	Harare	2018
Scotland	Belfast	2007	Ayr	2006
South Africa	Dublin (Malahide)	2021	Abu Dhabi	2024
Sri Lanka	-	-	-	-
United Arab Emirates	-	-	Brisbane	2015 ‡
United States	-	-	Harare	2023
West Indies	Dublin	2025	Nelson	2015 ‡
Zimbabwe	Bready	2019	Harare	2010
Last updated: 07 November 2026

=== Winning every match in a series ===
In a bilateral series winning all matches is referred to as whitewash. First such event occurred when West Indies toured England in 1976. Ireland have recorded two such series victories.

Opposition	Matches	Host	Season
Kenya	3	Ireland	2009
Zimbabwe	3	Ireland	2019
Last updated: 1 July 2020

=== Losing every match in a series ===
Ireland have also suffered such whitewash three times.

Opposition	Matches	Host	Season
Bangladesh	3	Bangladesh	2007/08
West Indies	3	West Indies	2019/20
Afghanistan	3	United Arab Emirates	2020/21
New Zealand	3	Ireland	2022
Last updated: 27 January 2021

=== Team scoring records ===
==== Most runs in an innings ====
The highest innings total scored in ODIs came in the match played between England and the Netherlands in June 2022. Playing in the first ODI at VRA Cricket Ground in Amstelveen, the visiting team posted a total of 498/4. The 2015 Cricket World Cup game against Zimbabwe in Hobart saw Ireland set their highest innings total of 331/8. Another game against Scotland in the 2017–18 United Arab Emirates Tri-Nation Series saw them post 331/6 at Dubai.

Rank	Score	Opposition	Venue	Date	Scorecard
1	359/9	New Zealand	Malahide Cricket Club Ground, Dublin, Ireland	15 July 2022	Scorecard
2	349/4	United Arab Emirates	Bulawayo Athletic Club, Bulawayo, Zimbabwe	27 June 2023	Scorecard
3	331/8	Zimbabwe	Bellerive Oval, Hobart, Australia	7 March 2015 ‡	Scorecard
3	331/6	Scotland	ICC Global Cricket Academy, Dubai, United Arab Emirates	18 January 2018	Scorecard
5	329/3	England	Rose Bowl, Southampton, England	4 August 2020	Scorecard
5	329/7	England	M. Chinnaswamy Stadium, Bangalore, India	2 March 2011 ‡	Scorecard
Last updated: 26 October 2026

==== Fewest runs in an innings ====
The lowest innings total scored in ODIs has been scored twice. Zimbabwe were dismissed for 35 by Sri Lanka during the third ODI in Sri Lanka's tour of Zimbabwe in April 2004 and USA were dismissed for same score by Nepal in the sixth ODI of the 2020 ICC Cricket World League 2 in Nepal in February 2020. The lowest score in ODI history for Ireland is 77 against Sri Lanka during the 2007 Cricket World Cup at St. George's, Grenada.

Rank	Score	Opposition	Venue	Date	Scorecard
1	77	Sri Lanka	National Cricket Stadium, St. George's, Grenada	18 April 2007 ‡	Scorecard
2	82	Pakistan	Malahide Cricket Club Ground, Dublin, Ireland	18 August 2016	Scorecard
3	91	Australia	Kensington Oval, Bridgetown, Barbados	13 April 2007 ‡	Scorecard
4	96	Pakistan	Stormont, Belfast, Northern Ireland	28 May 2011	Scorecard
5	100	Afghanistan	Sharjah Cricket Stadium, Sharjah, United Arab Emirates	5 December 2017	Scorecard
Last updated: 1 July 2020

==== Most runs conceded an innings ====
The highest innings total scored in ODIs against Ireland was during the 2015 Cricket World Cup when South Africa scored 411/4 at Manuka Oval in Canberra.

Rank	Score	Opposition	Venue	Date	Scorecard
1	411/4	South Africa	Manuka Oval, Canberra, Australia	3 March 2015 ‡	Scorecard
2	402/2	New Zealand	Mannofield Park, Aberdeen, Scotland	1 July 2008	Scorecard
3	385/7	West Indies	Clontarf Cricket Club Ground, Dublin, Ireland	25 May 2025	Scorecard
3	381/3	West Indies	Clontarf Cricket Club Ground, Dublin, Ireland	5 May 2019	Scorecard
4	377/8	Sri Lanka	Malahide Cricket Club Ground, Dublin, Ireland	18 June 2016	Scorecard
Last updated: 26 October 2026

==== Fewest runs conceded in an innings ====
The lowest score conceded by Ireland for a full inning is 91 scored by UAE in the 2018 ICC Cricket World Cup Qualifier.

Rank	Score	Opposition	Venue	Date	Scorecard
1	91	United Arab Emirates	Harare Sports Club, Harare, Zimbabwe	12 March 2018	Scorecard
2	104	Afghanistan	Clontarf Cricket Club Ground, Dublin, Ireland	5 July 2012	Scorecard
3	109	Scotland	Mannofield Park, Aberdeen, Scotland	22 August 2009	Scorecard
4	115	Kenya	Stormont, Belfast, Northern Ireland	24 August 2008	Scorecard
5	116	United Arab Emirates	Sheikh Zayed Stadium, Abu Dhabi, UAE	18 January 2021	Scorecard
Last updated: 22 January 2021

==== Most runs aggregate in a match ====
The highest match aggregate scored in ODIs came in the match between South Africa and Australia in the fifth ODI of March 2006 series at Wanderers Stadium, Johannesburg when South Africa scored 438/9 in response to Australia's 434/4. The highest aggregate involving Ireland is 719 against New Zealand in 2022.

Rank	Aggregate	Scores	Venue	Date	Scorecard
1	719/15	New Zealand (360/6) v Ireland (359/9)	Malahide Cricket Club Ground, Dublin, Ireland	15 July 2022	Scorecard
2	658/10	Ireland (327/5) v West Indies (331/5)	Malahide Cricket Club Ground, Dublin, Ireland	11 May 2019	Scorecard
3	657/13	England (328) v Ireland (329/3)	Rose Bowl, Southampton, England	4 August 2020	Scorecard
4	657/18	Ireland (331/8) v Zimbabwe (326)	Bellerive Oval, Hobart, Australia	7 March 2015 ‡	Scorecard
5	656/15	England (327/8) v Ireland (329/7)	M. Chinnaswamy Stadium, Bangalore, India	2 March 2011 ‡	Scorecard
Last updated: 7 November 2026

==== Fewest runs aggregate in a match ====
The lowest match aggregate in ODIs is 71 when USA were dismissed for 35 by Nepal in the sixth ODI of the 2020 ICC Cricket World League 2 in Nepal in February 2020. The lowest match aggregate in ODI history for Ireland is 158 scored in the 2007 Cricket World Cup game against Sri Lanka.

Rank	Aggregate	Scores	Venue	Date	Scorecard
1	158/12	Ireland (77) v Sri Lanka (81/2)	National Cricket Stadium, St. George's, Grenada	18 April 2007 ‡	Scorecard
2	183/11	Ireland (91) v Australia (92/1)	Kensington Oval, Bridgetown, Barbados	13 April 2007	Scorecard
3	193/13	Ireland (96) v Pakistan (97/3)	Stormont, Belfast, Northern Ireland	28 May 2011	Scorecard
4	203/10	Ireland (101) v Bangladesh (102/0)	Sylhet International Cricket Stadium, Sylhet, Bangladesh	23 March 2023	Scorecard
5	237/15	Scotland (117) v Ireland (120/5)	Sportpark Westvliet, Voorburg, Netherlands	5 July 2010	Scorecard
Last updated: 7 November 2026

=== Result records ===
An ODI match is won when one side has scored more runs than the total runs scored by the opposing side during their innings. If both sides have completed both their allocated innings and the side that fielded last has the higher aggregate of runs, it is known as a win by runs. This indicates the number of runs that they had scored more than the opposing side. If the side batting last wins the match, it is known as a win by wickets, indicating the number of wickets that were still to fall.

==== Greatest win margins (by runs) ====
The greatest winning margin by runs in ODIs was England's victory over South Africa by 342 runs in the third and final ODI of South Africa's 2025 tour of England. Ireland's largest victory was during the 2018 ICC Cricket World Cup Qualifier by 226 runs against the UAE.

Rank	Margin	Target	Opposition	Venue	Date
1	226 runs	318	United Arab Emirates	Harare Sports Club, Harare, Zimbabwe	12 March 2018
2	138 runs	350	United Arab Emirates	Bulawayo Sports Club, Bulawayo, Zimbabwe	27 June 2023
3	133 runs	329	Canada	Clontarf Cricket Club Ground, Dublin, Ireland	19 September 2011
4	124 runs	304	West Indies	Clontarf Cricket Club Ground, Dublin, Ireland	21 May 2025
5	117 runs	238	Kenya	Mombasa Sports Club Ground, Mombasa, Kenya	20 February 2012
Last updated: 26 October 2026

==== Greatest win margins (by balls remaining) ====
The greatest winning margin by balls remaining in ODIs was England's victory over Canada by 8 wickets with 277 balls remaining in the 1979 Cricket World Cup. The largest victory recorded by Ireland is against the Netherlands when they won by 9 wickets with 177 balls remaining.

Rank	Balls remaining	Margin	Opposition	Venue	Date
1	177	9 wickets	Netherlands	Clontarf Cricket Club Ground, Dublin, Ireland	18 August 2010
2	126	7 wickets	Netherlands	Clontarf Cricket Club Ground, Dublin, Ireland	28 July 2008
3	102	7 wickets	Scotland	Stormont, Belfast, Northern Ireland	8 September 2013
4	94	5 wickets	Scotland	Sportpark Westvliet, Voorburg, Netherlands	5 July 2010
5	94	6 wickets	United States	Harare Sports Club, Harare, Zimbabwe	30 June 2023
Last updated: 1 July 2020

==== Greatest win margins (by wickets) ====
A total of 55 matches have ended with chasing team winning by 10 wickets with West Indies winning by such margins a record 10 times. Ireland have not won an ODI match by this margin.

Rank	Margin	Opposition	Most recent venue	Date
1	9 wickets	Canada	Centurion Park, Centurion, South Africa	19 April 2009
1	9 wickets	Netherlands	Clontarf Cricket Club Ground, Dublin, Ireland	18 August 2010
3	8 wickets	United Arab Emirates	ICC Global Cricket Academy, Dubai, United Arab Emirates	4 March 2017
3	8 wickets	Netherlands	Sportpark Maarschalkerweerd, Utrecht, Netherlands	4 June 2021
4	7 wickets	Netherlands	Clontarf Cricket Club Ground, Dublin, Ireland	28 July 2008
4	7 wickets	Scotland	Clontarf Cricket Club Ground, Dublin, Ireland	31 July 2008
4	7 wickets	Scotland	Willowmoore Park, Benoni, South Africa	1 April 2009
4	7 wickets	Kenya	Hazelaarweg Stadion, Rotterdam, Netherlands	1 July 2010
4	7 wickets	Bangladesh	Stormont, Belfast, Northern Ireland	15 July 2010
4	7 wickets	Scotland	Stormont, Belfast, Northern Ireland	8 September 2013
4	7 wickets	Scotland	Malahide Cricket Club Ground, Dublin, Ireland	8 September 2014
4	7 wickets	Zimbabwe	Stormont, Belfast, Northern Ireland	13 September 2021
4	7 wickets	Zimbabwe	Harare Sports Club, Harare, Zimbabwe	17 December 2023
4	7 wickets	England	Rose Bowl, Southampton, England	4 August 2020
Last updated: 7 June 2021

==== Highest successful run chases ====
South Africa holds the record for the highest successful run chase which they achieved when they scored 438/9 in response to Australia's 434/9. Ireland's highest innings total while chasing is 329/7 in a successful run chase against England at Bangalore during the 2011 Cricket World Cup, which at that time was the highest successful chase in a World Cup, and 329/3 in the third ODI of the Ireland's tour of England in 2020 during the 2020–22 ICC Cricket World Cup Super League.

Rank	Score	Target	Opposition	Venue	Date
1	329/7	328	England	M. Chinnaswamy Stadium, Bangalore, India	2 March 2011 ‡
1	329/3	329	England	Rose Bowl, Southampton, England	4 August 2020
3	307/4	307	Netherlands	Eden Gardens, Kolkata, India	18 March 2011 ‡
4	307/6	305	West Indies	Saxton Oval, Nelson, New Zealand	16 February 2015 ‡
5	279/8	279	United Arab Emirates	Brisbane Cricket Ground, Brisbane, Australia	25 February 2015 ‡
Last updated: 4 August 2020

==== Narrowest win margins (by runs) ====
The narrowest run margin victory is by 1 run which has been achieved in 31 ODI's with Ireland winning such games once.

Rank	Margin	Opposition	Venue	Date
1	1 runs	Netherlands	Stormont, Belfast, Northern Ireland	11 July 2007
2	4 runs	Kenya	Clontarf Cricket Club Ground, Dublin, Ireland	12 July 2009
3	5 runs	Zimbabwe	Bellerive Oval, Hobart, Australia	7 March 2015 ‡
3	5 runs	Zimbabwe	Stormont, Belfast, Northern Ireland	4 July 2019
5	12 runs	Afghanistan	Stormont, Belfast, Northern Ireland	19 July 2016
Last updated: 1 July 2020

==== Narrowest win margins (by balls remaining) ====
The narrowest winning margin by balls remaining in ODIs is by winning of the last ball which has been achieved 36 times with both South Africa winning seven times. Ireland have not yet achieved victory by this margin.

Rank	Balls remaining	Margin	Opposition	Venue	Date
1	1	1 wicket	Scotland	Stormont, Belfast, Northern Ireland	6 September 2013
1	1	7 wickets	England	Rose Bowl, Southampton, England	4 August 2020
3	4	2 wickets	United Arab Emirates	Brisbane Cricket Ground, Brisbane, Australia	25 February 2015 ‡
3	4	4 wickets	United Arab Emirates	ICC Global Cricket Academy, Dubai, United Arab Emirates	11 January 2018
3	4	2 wickets	Nepal	Takashinga Sports Club, Harare, Zimbabwe	4 July 2023
5	5	3 wickets	England	M. Chinnaswamy Stadium, Bangalore, India	2 March 2011 ‡
5	5	4 wickets	Papua New Guinea	Harare Sports Club, Harare, Zimbabwe	6 March 2018
Last updated: 26 October 2026

==== Narrowest win margins (by wickets) ====
The narrowest margin of victory by wickets is 1 wicket which has settled 55 such ODIs. Both West Indies and New Zealand have recorded such victory on eight occasions. Ireland has won the match by a margin of one wicket on one occasion.

Rank	Margin	Opposition	Venue	Date
1	1 wicket	Scotland	Stormont, Belfast, Northern Ireland	6 September 2013
2	2 wickets	United Arab Emirates	Brisbane Cricket Ground, Brisbane, Australia	25 February 2015 ‡
2	2 wickets	Zimbabwe	Harare Sports Club, Harare, Zimbabwe	13 October 2015
2	2 wickets	West Indies	Sabina Park, Kingston, West Indies	16 January 2022
2	2 wickets	Nepal	Takashinga Sports Club, Harare, Zimbabwe	4 July 2023
Last updated: 26 October 2026

==== Greatest loss margins (by runs) ====
Ireland's biggest defeat by runs was against New Zealand in the only ODI of the 2008 England tour with the visitors winning by 290 runs.

Rank	Margin	Opposition	Venue	Date
1	290 runs	New Zealand	Mannofield Park, Aberdeen, Scotland	1 July 2008
2	255 runs	Pakistan	Malahide Cricket Club Ground, Dublin, Ireland	18 August 2016
3	206 runs	South Africa	Willowmoore Park, Benoni, South Africa	25 September 2016
4	201 runs	South Africa	Manuka Oval, Canberra, Australia	3 March 2015 ‡
5	197 runs	West Indies	Clontarf Cricket Club Ground, Dublin, Ireland	25 May 2025
Last updated: 26 October 2026

==== Greatest loss margins (by balls remaining) ====
The greatest winning margin by balls remaining in ODIs was England's victory over Canada by 8 wickets with 277 balls remaining in the 1979 Cricket World Cup. The largest defeat suffered by Ireland was against Sri Lanka in 2007 Cricket World Cup when they lost by 8 wickets with 240 balls remaining.

Rank	Balls remaining	Margin	Opposition	Venue	Date
1	240	8 wickets	Sri Lanka	National Cricket Stadium, St. George's, Grenada	18 April 2007 ‡
2	226	9 wickets	Australia	Kensington Oval, Bridgetown, Barbados	13 April 2007 ‡
3	221	10 wickets	Bangladesh	Sylhet International Cricket Stadium, Sylhet	23 March 2023
4	180	7 wicket	England	Bristol County Ground, Bristol, England	5 May 2017
5	157	8 wickets	Afghanistan	Stormont, Belfast, Northern Ireland	31 August 2018
Last updated: 26 October 2026

==== Greatest loss margins (by wickets) ====
Ireland have lost an ODI match by the maximum 10 wickets on one occasion.

Rank	Margin	Opposition	Most recent venue	Date
1	10 wickets	Bangladesh	Sylhet International Cricket Stadium, Sylhet	23 March 2023
2	9 wickets	Australia	Kensington Oval, Bridgetown, Barbados	13 April 2007 ‡
2	9 wickets	India	Stormont, Belfast, Northern Ireland	23 June 2007
2	9 wickets	Australia	Willowmoore Park, Benoni, South Africa	27 September 2016
2	9 wickets	Zimbabwe	Harare Sports Club, Harare, Zimbabwe	18 February 2025
Last updated: 26 October 2026

==== Narrowest loss margins (by runs) ====
The narrowest loss of Ireland in terms of runs is by 1 run suffered against Netherlands in 2021.

Rank	Margin	Opposition	Venue	Date
1	1 run	Netherlands	Sportpark Maarschalkerweerd, Utrecht, Netherlands	2 June 2021
1	1 run	New Zealand	Malahide Cricket Club Ground, Dublin, Ireland	15 July 2022
3	3 runs	England	Stormont, Belfast, Northern Ireland	27 August 2009
4	4 runs	Canada	Toronto Cricket, Skating and Curling Club Ground, Toronto, Canada	6 September 2010
5	6 runs	Netherlands	Gymkhana Club Ground, Nairobi, Kenya	5 February 2007
Last updated: 7 June 2021

==== Narrowest loss margins (by balls remaining) ====
The narrowest winning margin by balls remaining in ODIs is by winning of the last ball which has been achieved 36 times with South Africa winning seven times. Ireland has suffered loss by this margin on two occasions.

Rank	Balls remaining	Margin	Opposition	Venue	Date
1	0	3 wickets	Scotland	Gymkhana Club Ground, Nairobi, Kenya	30 January 2007
1	0	2 wickets	Zimbabwe	Harare Sports Club, Harare, Zimbabwe	26 September 2010
3	1	1 wicket	West Indies	Kensington Oval, Bridgetown, Barbados	9 January 2020
4	2	6 wickets	Canada	Jaffery Sports Club Ground, Nairobi, Kenya	4 February 2007
5	5	5 wicket	Afghanistan	Harare Sports Club, Harare, Zimbabwe	23 March 2018
Last updated: 1 July 2020

==== Narrowest loss margins (by wickets) ====
Ireland has suffered defeat by 1 wicket three times with most recent being against New Zealand during the first ODI of the Ireland vs New Zealand.

Rank	Margin	Opposition	Venue	Date
1	1 wicket	Kenya	Ruaraka Sports Club Ground, Nairobi, Kenya	2 February 2007
1	1 wicket	West Indies	Kensington Oval, Bridgetown, Barbados	9 January 2020
1	1 wicket	New Zealand	Malahide Cricket Club Ground, Dublin, Ireland	10 July 2022
3	2 wickets	Zimbabwe	Harare Sports Club, Harare, Zimbabwe	26 September 2010
3	2 wickets	Pakistan	Clontarf Cricket Club Ground, Dublin, Ireland	26 May 2013
3	2 wickets	Zimbabwe	Harare Sports Club, Harare, Zimbabwe	9 October 2015
Last updated: 1 July 2020

==== Tied matches ====
A tie can occur when the scores of both teams are equal at the conclusion of play, provided that the side batting last has completed their innings. There have been 38 ties in ODIs history with Ireland involved in 3 such games.

Opposition	Venue	Date
Zimbabwe	Sabina Park, Kingston, Jamaica	15 March 2007 ‡
Pakistan	Clontarf Cricket Club Ground, Dublin, Ireland	23 May 2013
Netherlands	VRA Cricket Ground, Amstelveen, Netherlands	9 July 2013
Last updated: 3 December 2017

== Individual records ==
=== Batting records ===
==== Most career runs ====
A run is the basic means of scoring in cricket. A run is scored when the batsman hits the ball with his bat and with his partner runs the length of 22 yards (20 m) of the pitch. India's Sachin Tendulkar has scored the most runs in ODIs with 18,246. Second is Kumar Sangakkara of Sri Lanka with 14,234 ahead of Ricky Ponting from Australia in third with 13,704. Paul Stirling is the leading Irish batsmen with 6,213 runs.

Rank	Runs	Player	Matches	Innings	Average	100	50	Period
1	6,213	Paul Stirling†	177	168	37.65	14	34	2008–2026
2	4,343	William Porterfield	148	145	30.58	11	20	2006–2022
3	3,619	Kevin O'Brien	153	141	29.42	2	18	2006–2021
4	3,519	Andrew Balbirnie†	126	119	31.70	10	17	2010–2026
5	2,581	Niall O'Brien	103	101	28.05	1	18	2006–2018
6	2,174	Harry Tector†	63	58	41.80	5	15	2020–2026
7	2,151	Ed Joyce	61	60	41.36	5	12	2011–2018
8	2,072	Gary Wilson	105	99	23.81	1	12	2007–2019
9	1,610	George Dockrell†	139	100	23.00	0	6	2010–2026
10	1,554	Curtis Campher†	52	44	37.00	2	10	2020–2026
Last updated: 7 November 2026

==== Fastest runs getter ====
Runs	Batsman	Match	Innings	Record Date	Reference
1,000	Harry Tector	25	25	21 January 2023	
2,000	Paul Stirling	62	61	13 October 2015	
3,000	Paul Stirling	91	89	18 January 2018	
4,000	Paul Stirling	113	110	4 July 2019	
5,000	Paul Stirling	135	132	13 January 2022	
6,000	Paul Stirling	170	162	25 May 2025	

==== Most runs in each batting position ====
Batting position	Batsman	Innings	Runs	Average	ODI Career Span	Ref
Opener	Paul Stirling†	158	5,997	38.19	2010–2026	
Number 3	Andrew Balbirnie†	60	2,053	37.32	2017–2023	
Number 4	Harry Tector†	58	2,174	41.80	2020-2026	
Number 5	Kevin O'Brien	64	1,707	30.48	2007–2020	
Number 6	Kevin O'Brien	47	1,146	27.28	2007–2018	
Number 7	George Dockrell†	20	570	33.52	2019–2026	
Number 8	John Mooney	24	347	18.26	2006–2015	
Number 9	Barry McCarthy†	22	165	9.16	2016–2025	
Number 10	Tim Murtagh	25	136	8.00	2012–2019	
Number 11	Craig Young	13	89	12.71	2015–2024	
Last updated: 7 November 2026

==== Most runs against each team ====
Opposition	Runs	Batsman	Matches	Innings	Career Span	Ref
Afghanistan	1,367	Paul Stirling†	30	29	2010–2021	
Australia	90	Paul Stirling†	4	4	2010–2016	
Bangladesh	379	William Porterfield†	10	9	2007–2019	
Bermuda	112	William Porterfield†	1	1	2007–2007	
Canada	273	Paul Stirling†	4	4	2010–2011	
England	362	Paul Stirling†	12	12	2009–2023	
India	173	Niall O'Brien	3	3	2007–2015	
Kenya	316	William Porterfield†	9	9	2007–2012	
Netherlands	412	Paul Stirling†	9	9	2010–2021	
New Zealand	225	Harry Tector†	3	3	2022–2022	
Oman	91	George Dockrell†	1	1	2023–2023	
Pakistan	254	Paul Stirling†	6	6	2011–2016	
Papua New Guinea	111	William Porterfield†	1	1	2018–2018	
Scotland	480	Niall O'Brien	12	11	2006–2018	
South Africa	232	Andrew Balbirnie†	4	4	2015–2021	
Sri Lanka	135	William Porterfield†	4	4	2007–2016	
United Arab Emirates	472	William Porterfield†	6	6	2015–2018	
West Indies	475	Paul Stirling†	15	14	2010–2025	
Zimbabwe	738	Paul Stirling†	23	21	2010–2025	
Last updated: 25 May 2025

==== Highest individual score ====
The second ODI of the Ireland's tour of Canada in 2010 saw Paul Stirling score the highest individual score for Ireland.

Rank	Runs	Player	Opposition	Venue	Date
1	177	Paul Stirling†	Canada	Toronto Cricket, Skating and Curling Club Ground, Toronto, Canada	7 September 2010
2	162	Paul Stirling†	United Arab Emirates	Bulawayo Athletic Club, Bulawayo, Zimbabwe	27 June 2023
3	160*	Ed Joyce	Afghanistan	Stormont, Belfast, Northern Ireland	19 July 2016
4	145*	Andrew Balbirnie†	Afghanistan	Rajiv Gandhi International Cricket Stadium, Dehradun, India	5 March 2019
5	142	Kevin O'Brien	Kenya	Ruaraka Sports Club Ground, Nairobi, Kenya	2 February 2007
5	142	Paul Stirling†	England	Rose Bowl, Southampton, England	4 August 2020
Last updated: 27 June 2023

==== Highest individual score – progression of record ====
Runs	Player	Opponent	Venue	Season
52	Andre Botha	England	Stormont, Belfast, Northern Ireland	2006
99	Eoin Morgan	Scotland	Cambusdoon New Ground, Ayr, Scotland	2006
116	Jeremy Bray	Scotland	Gymkhana Club Ground, Nairobi, Kenya	2006-07
142	Kevin O'Brien	Kenya	Ruaraka Sports Club Ground, Nairobi, Kenya	2006-07
177	Paul Stirling†	Canada	Toronto Cricket, Skating and Curling Club Ground, Toronto, Canada	2010
Last updated: 1 July 2020

==== Highest score against each opponent ====
Opposition	Runs	Player	Venue	Date	Ref
Afghanistan	160*	Ed Joyce	Stormont, Belfast, Northern Ireland	19 July 2010	
Australia	45	Niall O'Brien	Stormont, Belfast, Northern Ireland	27 August 2015	
Bangladesh	140	Harry Tector	County Ground, Chelmsford, England	12 May 2023	
Bermuda	112*	William Porterfield	Jaffery Sports Club Ground, Nairobi, Kenya	31 January 2007	
Canada	177	Paul Stirling	Toronto Cricket, Skating and Curling Club Ground, Toronto, Canada	7 September 2010	
England	142	Paul Stirling	Rose Bowl, Southampton, England	4 August 2020	
India	75	William Porterfield	M. Chinnaswamy Stadium, Bangalore, India	6 March 2011 ‡	
Kenya	142	Kevin O'Brien	Ruaraka Sports Club Ground, Nairobi, Kenya	2 February 2007	
Netherlands	113	Gary Wilson	Clontarf Cricket Club Ground, Dublin, Ireland	16 August 2010	
New Zealand	120	Paul Stirling	Malahide Cricket Club Ground, Dublin, Ireland	15 July 2022	
Oman	91	George Dockrell	Bulawayo Athletic Club, Bulawayo, Zimbabwe	19 June 2023	
Pakistan	116*	Ed Joyce	Clontarf Cricket Club Ground, Dublin, Ireland	26 May 2013	
Papua New Guinea	111	William Porterfield	Harare Sports Club, Harare, Zimbabwe	6 March 2018	
Scotland	116	Jeremy Bray	Gymkhana Club Ground, Nairobi, Kenya	30 January 2007	
South Africa	102	Andrew Balbirnie	Malahide Cricket Club Ground, Dublin, Ireland	13 July 2021	
Sri Lanka	79	Andy McBrine	Malahide Cricket Club Ground, Dublin, Ireland	18 June 2016	
United Arab Emirates	139	William Porterfield	ICC Global Cricket Academy, Dubai, UAE	13 January 2018	
West Indies	135	Andrew Balbirnie	Malahide Cricket Club Ground, Dublin, Ireland	11 May 2019	
Zimbabwe	115*	Jeremy Bray	Sabina Park, Kingston, Jamaica	15 March 2007 ‡	
Last updated: 19 June 2023.

==== Highest career average ====
A batsman's batting average is the total number of runs they have scored divided by the number of times they have been dismissed.

Rank	Average	Player	Innings	Runs	Not out	Period
1	41.80	Harry Tector†	58	2,174	6	2020–2026
2	41.36	Ed Joyce	60	2,151	8	2011–2018
3	37.65	Paul Stirling†	168	6,213	3	2008–2026
4	37.00	Curtis Campher†	44	1,554	2	2020–2026
5	35.42	Eoin Morgan	23	744	2	2006–2009
Qualification: 20 innings Last updated: 7 November 2026

==== Highest Average in each batting position ====
Batting position	Batsman	Innings	Runs	Average	Career Span	Ref
Opener	Paul Stirling†	158	5,997	38.19	2010–2026	
Number 3	Andrew Balbirnie†	60	2,053	37.32	2017–2023	
Number 4	Harry Tector†	58	2,174	41.80	2020–2026	
Number 5	Kevin O'Brien	64	1,707	30.48	2007–2020	
Number 6	Curtis Campher†	23	885	40.22	2020-2026	
Number 7	George Dockrell†	20	570	33.52	2010-2026	
Number 8	Trent Johnston	20	310	28.18	2006–2012	
Number 9	Barry McCarthy	20	116	7.25	2016–2021	
Number 10	Tim Murtagh	25	136	8.00	2012–2019	
Number 11	Boyd Rankin	21	80	16.00	2007–2020	
Last updated: 7 November 2026. Qualification: Min 20 innings batted at position

==== Most half-centuries ====
A half-century is a score of between 50 and 99 runs. Statistically, once a batsman's score reaches 100, it is no longer considered a half-century but a century.

Sachin Tendulkar of India has scored the most half-centuries in ODIs with 96. He is followed by the Sri Lanka's Kumar Sangakkara on 93, South Africa's Jacques Kallis on 86 and India's Rahul Dravid and Pakistan's Inzamam-ul-Haq on 83. Paul Stirling is the highest rated Irish with 32 fifties.

Rank	Half centuries	Player	Innings	Runs	Period
1	34	Paul Stirling†	168	6,213	2008–2026
2	20	William Porterfield	145	4,343	2006–2022
3	18	Niall O'Brien	101	2,581	2006–2018
3	18	Kevin O'Brien	141	3,619	2006–2021
5	17	Andrew Balbirnie†	119	3,519	2010–2026
Last updated: 7 November 2026

==== Most centuries ====
A century is a score of 100 or more runs in a single innings.

Paul Stirling is the leading Irish batsman with 14 centuries.

Rank	Centuries	Player	Innings	Runs	Period
1	14	Paul Stirling†	168	6,213	2010–2026
2	11	William Porterfield	145	4,343	2006–2022
3	10	Andrew Balbirnie†	110	3,519	2010–2026
4	5	Ed Joyce	60	2,151	2011–2018
5	5	Harry Tector†	58	2,174	2020–2026
Last updated: 21 May 2025

==== Most Sixes ====
Rank	Sixes	Player	Innings	Runs	Period
1	155	Paul Stirling†	168	6,213	2008–2026
2	84	Kevin O'Brien	141	3,619	2006–2021
3	47	Harry Tector†	58	2,174	2020–2026
3	47	Andrew Balbirnie†	119	3,519	2010–2026
5	34	Curtis Campher†	44	1,554	2020-2026
Last updated: 07 November 2026

==== Most Fours ====
Rank	Fours	Player	Innings	Runs	Period
1	643	Paul Stirling†	162	6,005	2008–2025
2	455	William Porterfield	145	4,343	2006–2022
3	336	Andrew Balbirnie†	119	3,519	2010–2026
4	332	Kevin O'Brien	141	3,619	2006–2021
5	218	Niall O'Brien	101	2,581	2006–2018
Last updated: 07 November 2026

==== Highest strike rates ====
Andre Russell of West Indies holds the record for highest strike rate, with minimum 500 balls faced qualification, with 130.22.Trent Johnston is the Irishman with the highest strike rate.

Rank	Strike rate	Player	Runs	Balls Faced	Period
1	94.64	Trent Johnston	743	785	2006–2013
2	88.78	Kevin O'Brien	3,619	4,076	2006–2021
3	87.84	Curtis Campher†	1,554	1,769	2020-2026
4	87.59	Paul Stirling†	6,213	7,093	2008–2026
5	83.89	Lorcan Tucker†	1,196	1,427	2019-2026
Qualification= 500 balls faced. Last updated: 7 November 2026

==== Highest strike rates in an inning ====
James Franklin of New Zealand's strike rate of 387.50 during his 31* off 8 balls against Canada during 2011 Cricket World Cup is the world record for highest strike rate in an innings. Dave Langford-Smith is the highest rated Irishmen on this list.

Rank	Strike rate	Player	Runs	Balls Faced	Opposition	Venue	Date
1	238.46	Dave Langford-Smith	31*	13	Netherlands	Stormont, Belfast, Northern Ireland	7 July 2007
2	236.84	Trent Johnston	45*	19	Scotland	Gymkhana Club Ground, Nairobi, Kenya	30 January 2007
3	233.33	Kevin O'Brien	35	15	Canada	Clontarf Cricket Club Ground, Dublin, Ireland	19 September 2011
4	207.14	Regan West	29*	14	Kenya	Clontarf Cricket Club Ground, Dublin, Ireland	12 July 2009
5	200.00	Kevin O'Brien	50	25	United Arab Emirates	Brisbane Cricket Ground, Brisbane, Australia	25 February 2015 ‡
Last updated: 1 July 2020

==== Most runs in a calendar year ====
Tendulkar holds the record for most runs scored in a calendar year with 1894 runs scored in 1998. Stirling is the highest ranked Irish batsmen with 771 runs in 2010.

Rank	Runs	Player	Matches	Innings	Year
1	771	Paul Stirling	17	17	2010
2	711	Harry Tector†	20	16	2023
3	705	Paul Stirling	14	14	2021
4	692	Paul Stirling	14	13	2019
5	656	Paul Stirling	16	15	2017
Last updated: 7 November 2026

==== Most runs in a series ====
The 1980-81 Benson & Hedges World Series Cup in Australia saw Greg Chappell set the record for the most runs scored in a single series scoring 685 runs. Ed Joyce holds the corresponding record for Ireland.

Rank	Runs	Player	Matches	Innings	Series
1	428	Ed Joyce	9	9	2011–13 ICC World Cricket League Championship
2	341	Paul Stirling†	5	5	Ireland v Afghanistan in India in 2016-17
3	339	Ed Joyce	4	4	Afghan cricket team in Ireland in 2016
4	332	William Porterfield	5	5	2007 ICC World Cricket League Division One
5	322	William Porterfield	9	9	2011–13 ICC World Cricket League Championship
Last updated: 7 November 2026

==== Most ducks ====
A duck refers to a batsman being dismissed without scoring a run. Sanath Jayasuriya has scored the equal highest number of ducks in ODIs with 34 such knocks. Stirling holds the dubious record for Ireland.

Rank	Ducks	Player	Matches	Innings	Period
1	13	Paul Stirling†	170	162	2008–2025
2	12	William Porterfield	148	145	2006–2022
3	8	Alex Cusack	59	47	2007–2015
3	8	Andrew Balbirnie†	117	110	2010–2025
3	8	George Dockrell†	126	119	2010–2026
Last updated: 7 November 2026

== Bowling records ==
=== Most career wickets ===
A bowler takes the wicket of a batsman when the form of dismissal is bowled, caught, leg before wicket, stumped or hit wicket. If the batsman is dismissed by run out, obstructing the field, handling the ball, hitting the ball twice or timed out the bowler does not receive credit.

Ireland's leading wicket taker is Kevin O'Brien with 114 wickets taken so far in ODIs.

Rank	Wickets	Player	Matches	Innings	Average	4	5	Period
1	114	Kevin O'Brien	153	116	32.68	5	0	2006–2021
2	111	George Dockrell†	131	110	35.89	4	0	2010–2025
3	96	Boyd Rankin	68	67	28.27	3	0	2007–2020
4	91	Andy McBrine†	96	91	38.01	2	1	2014–2025
5	81	Craig Young†	48	45	25.85	1	1	2014–2024
6	81	Barry McCarthy†	48	48	29.20	3	1	2016–2025
7	74	Tim Murtagh	58	57	30.94	4	1	2012–2019
8	71	Mark Adair†	54	52	33.95	6	0	2019–2025
9	66	Trent Johnston	67	63	32.04	1	1	2006–2013
10	63	Alex Cusack	59	52	23.96	1	1	2007–2015
Last updated: 25 May 2025

=== Fastest wicket taker ===
Wickets	Bowler	Match	Record Date	Reference
50	Barry McCarthy	25	5 May 2019	
100	Kevin O'Brien	113	5 December 2017	
Last updated: 1 July 2020

=== Most career wickets against each team ===
Opposition	Wickets	Player	Matches	Innings	Average	Period	Ref
Afghanistan	28	Tim Murtagh	24	24	33.46	2012–2019	
Australia	3	Tim Murtagh	3	2	22.00	2012–2016	
Australia	3	Kevin O'Brien	4	2	24.33	2007–2016	
Bangladesh	10	Graham Hume	5	5	22.20	2023–2023	
Bangladesh	10	Mark Adair†	7	7	35.40	2019–2023	
Bermuda	3	Andre Botha	1	1	24.66	2007–2007	
Canada	15	Trent Johnston	8	7	11.66	2007–2011	
England	10	John Mooney	6	4	20.10	2006–2015	
England	10	Josh Little†	6	4	24.90	2019–2023	
India	2	Trent Johnston	2	2	20.50	2007–2011	
India	2	Stuart Thompson	1	1	22.50	2015–2015	
India	2	George Dockrell†	2	2	46.50	2011–2015	
Kenya	14	Kyle McCallan	7	6	14.85	2007–2009	
Netherlands	17	Kevin O'Brien	11	9	15.82	2006–2021	
New Zealand	5	Curtis Campher†	3	3	22.40	2022–2022	
New Zealand	5	Craig Young†	4	4	50.60	2017–2022	
Pakistan	9	Alex Cusack	5	5	21.88	2011–2015	
Papua New Guinea	3	Andy McBrine†	1	1	12.66	2018–2018	
Scotland	13	George Dockrell†	9	9	23.69	2010–2023	
South Africa	5	Craig Young†	4	3	35.20	2016–2021	
Sri Lanka	7	Barry McCarthy†	3	3	25.28	2016–2023	
United Arab Emirates	10	Andy McBrine†	7	7	22.70	2017–2023	
United Arab Emirates	10	George Dockrell†	6	6	24.20	2015–2023	
United States	3	Craig Young†	1	1	11.66	2023–2023	
West Indies	18	Andy McBrine†	11	11	24.38	2015–2025	
Zimbabwe	19	Mark Adair†	14	13	27.00	2019–2025	
Last updated: 25 May 2025

=== Best figures in an innings ===
Bowling figures refers to the number of the wickets a bowler has taken and the number of runs conceded. Sri Lanka's Chaminda Vaas holds the world record for best figures in an innings when he took 8/19 against Zimbabwe in December 2001 at Colombo (SSC). Paul Stirling holds the Ireland record for best bowling figures.

Rank	Figures	Player	Opposition	Venue	Date
1	6/55	Paul Stirling†	Afghanistan	Greater Noida Sports Complex Ground, Greater Noida, India	17 March 2017
2	5/10	Simi Singh†	United Arab Emirates	Sheikh Zayed Stadium, Abu Dhabi, UAE	18 January 2021
3	5/14	Trent Johnston	Canada	Centurion Park, Centurion, South Africa	19 April 2009
4	5/20	Alex Cusack	Afghanistan	Hazelaarweg Stadion, Rotterdam, Netherlands	3 July 2010
5	5/21	Tim Murtagh	Zimbabwe	Stormont, Belfast, Northern Ireland	4 July 2019
Last updated: 22 January 2021

=== Best figures in an innings – progression of record ===
Figures	Player	Opposition	Venue	Date
3/63	Dave Langford-Smith	England	Stormont, Belfast, Northern Ireland	2006
3/32	Dave Langford-Smith	Scotland	Cambusdoon New Ground, Ayr, Scotland	2006
4/36	Kyle McCallan	Kenya	Ruaraka Sports Club Ground, Nairobi, Kenya	2006-07
4/19	Andre Botha	Kenya	Stormont, Belfast, Northern Ireland	2008
5/14	Trent Johnston	Canada	Centurion Park, Centurion, South Africa	2009
6/55	Paul Stirling†	Afghanistan	Greater Noida Sports Complex Ground, Greater Noida, India	2016-17
Last updated: 1 July 2020

=== Best Bowling Figure against each opponent ===
Opposition	Figures	Player	Venue	Date	Ref
Afghanistan	6/55	Paul Stirling †	Greater Noida Sports Complex Ground, Greater Noida, India	17 March 2017	
Australia	3/43	Kevin O'Brien	Clontarf Cricket Club Ground, Dublin, Ireland	17 June 2010	
Bangladesh	4/40	Mark Adair†	County Ground, Chelmsford, England	14 May 2023	
Bermuda	3/74	Andre Botha	Jaffery Sports Club Ground, Nairobi, Kenya	31 January 2007	
Canada	5/14	Trent Johnston	Centurion Park, Centurion, South Africa	19 April 2009	
England	4/26	Trent Johnston	Stormont, Belfast, Northern Ireland	27 August 2009	
India	2/16	Trent Johnston	M. Chinnaswamy Stadium, Bangalore, India	6 March 2011 ‡	
Kenya	4/19	Andre Botha	Stormont, Belfast, Northern Ireland	24 August 2008	
Netherlands	4/11	Paul Stirling†	VRA Cricket Ground, Amstelveen, Netherlands	9 July 2010	
New Zealand	2/35	Kyle McCallan	Providence Stadium, Providence, Guyana	9 April 2007 ‡	
Pakistan	4/62	Barry McCarthy†	Malahide Cricket Club Ground, Dublin, Ireland	18 August 2016	
Papua New Guinea	3/38	Andy McBrine †	Harare Sports Club, Harare, Zimbabwe	6 March 2018	
Scotland	5/46	Craig Young †	Malahide Cricket Club Ground, Dublin, Ireland	8 September 2014	
South Africa	3/15	Alex Cusack	Stormont, Belfast, Northern Ireland	24 June 2007	
Sri Lanka	3/66	Tim Murtagh	Malahide Cricket Club Ground, Dublin, Ireland	18 June 2016	
United Arab Emirates	5/10	Simi Singh †	Sheikh Zayed Stadium, Abu Dhabi, UAE	18 January 2021	
West Indies	4/28	Andy McBrine	Sabina Park, Kingston, West Indies	16 January 2022	
Zimbabwe	5/21	Tim Murtagh	Stormont, Belfast, Northern Ireland	4 July 2019	
Last updated: 18 March 2023

=== Best career average ===
A bowler's bowling average is the total number of runs they have conceded divided by the number of wickets they have taken. Afghanistan's Rashid Khan holds the record for the best career average in ODIs with 18.54. Joel Garner, West Indian cricketer, and a member of the highly regarded late 1970s and early 1980s West Indies cricket teams, is second behind Rashid with an overall career average of 18.84 runs per wicket. Boyd Rankin of Ireland is the highest ranked Irish bowler when the qualification of 2000 balls bowled is followed.

Rank	Average	Player	Wickets	Runs	Balls	Period
1	25.85	Craig Young†	81	2,094	2,300	2014–2024
2	28.27	Boyd Rankin	96	2,714	3,383	2007–2020
3	29.20	Barry McCarthy†	81	2,366	2,405	2016–2025
4	30.94	Tim Murtagh	74	2,290	3,020	2012–2019
5	32.04	Trent Johnston	66	2,115	2,930	2006–2013
Qualification: 2,000 balls. Last updated: 25 May 2025

=== Best career economy rate ===
A bowler's economy rate is the total number of runs they have conceded divided by the number of overs they have bowled. West Indies' Joel Garner, holds the ODI record for the best career economy rate with 3.09. Trent Johnston, with a rate of 4.33 runs per over conceded over his 67-match ODI career, is the highest Irish bowler on the list when the qualification of 2000 balls bowled is followed.

Rank	Economy rate	Player	Wickets	Runs	Balls	Period
1	4.33	Trent Johnston	66	2,115	2,930	2006–2013
2	4.54	Tim Murtagh	74	2,290	3,020	2012–2019
3	4.58	Andy McBrine†	91	3,459	4,523	2014–2025
4	4.77	Paul Stirling†	43	1,942	2,441	2008–2025
5	4.81	Boyd Rankin	96	2,714	3,383	2007–2020
Qualification: 2,000 balls. Last updated: 25 May 2025

=== Best career strike rate ===
A bowler's strike rate is the total number of balls they have bowled divided by the number of wickets they have taken. The top bowler with the best ODI career strike rate is Australia's Ryan Harris with strike rate of 23.4 balls per wicket. South Africa's Lungi Ngidi is at third position in this list.

Rank	Strike rate	Player	Wickets	Runs	Balls	Period
1	28.4	Craig Young†	81	2,094	2,300	2014–2024
2	29.7	Barry McCarthy†	81	2,366	2,405	2016–2025
3	35.0	Mark Adair†	71	2,411	2,487	2019–2025
4	35.2	Boyd Rankin	96	2,714	3,383	2007–2020
5	48.0	Kevin O'Brien	114	3,726	4,296	2006–2021
Qualification: 2,000 balls. Last updated: 25 May 2025

=== Most four-wickets (& over) hauls in an innings ===
Brett Lee is joint-third on the list of most four-wicket hauls behind Pakistan's Waqar Younis and Sri Lanka's Muttiah Muralitharan.

Rank	Four-wicket hauls	Player	Matches	Balls	Wickets	Period
1	6	Mark Adair†	54	2,487	71	2019–2025
2	5	Kevin O'Brien	153	4,296	114	2006–2021
3	4	Tim Murtagh	58	3,020	74	2012–2019
3	4	George Dockrell†	133	4,871	111	2010–2025
5	3	Josh Little†	42	2,021	61	2019–2025
5	3	Boyd Rankin	68	3,383	96	2007–2020
5	3	Barry McCarthy†	48	2,405	81	2016–2025
Last updated: 25 May 2025

=== Most five-wicket hauls in a match ===
A five-wicket haul refers to a bowler taking five wickets in a single innings. Ten Irish bowlers have taken a five-wicket haul once in their career.

Rank	Five-wicket hauls	Player	Matches	Balls	Wickets	Period
1	1	Trent Johnston	67	2,930	66	2006–2013
1	1	Alex Cusack	59	1,953	63	2007–2015
1	1	Albert van der Merwe	9	432	11	2010–2011
1	1	Craig Young†	48	2,300	81	2014–2024
1	1	Paul Stirling†	169	2,441	43	2008–2025
1	1	Barry McCarthy†	48	2,405	81	2016–2024
1	1	Tim Murtagh	58	3,020	74	2012–2019
1	1	Simi Singh	35	1,519	39	2012–2021
1	1	Andy McBrine†	96	4,523	91	2014–2025
1	1	Josh Little†	42	2,021	61	2019–2025
Last updated: 21 May 2025

=== Best economy rates in an inning ===
The best economy rate in an inning, when a minimum of 30 balls are delivered by the player, is West Indies player Phil Simmons economy of 0.30 during his spell of 3 runs for 4 wickets in 10 overs against Pakistan at Sydney Cricket Ground in the 1991–92 Australian Tri-Series. Alex Cusack holds the Ireland record during his spell against Scotland at Aberdeen in 2009.

Rank	Economy	Player	Overs	Runs	Wickets	Opposition	Venue	Date
1	0.60	Alex Cusack	5	3	0	Scotland	Mannofield Park, Aberdeen, Scotland	9 August 2009
2	0.62	Andre Botha	8	5	2	Pakistan	Sabina Park, Kingston, Jamaica	17 March 2007 ‡
3	1.00	Simi Singh	10	10	5	United Arab Emirates	Sheikh Zayed Stadium, Abu Dhabi, UAE	18 January 2021
4	1.08	Alex Cusack	8.2	9	1	Scotland	Sportpark Westvliet, Voorburg, Netherlands	5 July 2010
5	1.33	Andy McBrine†	6	8	0	United Arab Emirates	Harare Sports Club, Harare, Zimbabwe	12 March 2018
Qualification: 30 balls bowled. Last updated: 22 January 2021

=== Best strike rates in an inning ===
The best strike rate in an inning, when a minimum of 4 wickets are taken by the player, is shared by Sunil Dhaniram of Canada, Paul Collingwood of England and Virender Sehwag of India when they achieved a striekk rate of 4.2 balls per wicket. McGrath has the best strike rate for Ireland during his spell of 7/15 against Namibia at the 2003 Cricket World Cup.

Rank	Strike rate	Player	Wickets	Runs	Balls	Opposition	Venue	Date
1	9.0	Boyd Rankin	4	15	36	United Arab Emirates	Harare Sports Club, Harare, Zimbabwe	12 March 2018
2	9.8	Alex Cusack	5	20	49	Afghanistan	Hazelaarweg Stadion, Rotterdam, Netherlands	3 July 2010
3	10.0	Paul Stirling†	6	55	60	Afghanistan	Greater Noida Sports Complex Ground, Greater Noida, India	17 March 2017
3	10.0	Mark Adair†	4	19	40	Afghanistan	Stormont, Belfast, Northern Ireland	19 May 2019
5	10.2	Paul Stirling†	4	11	41	Netherlands	VRA Cricket Ground, Amstelveen, Netherlands	9 July 2010
Last updated: 1 July 2020

=== Worst figures in an innings ===
The worst figures in an ODI came in the 5th One Day International between South Africa at home to Australia in 2006. Australia's Mick Lewis returned figures of 0/113 from his 10 overs in the second innings of the match. The worst figure for Ireland are 0/95 which came off the bowling of Peter Connell in July 2008.

Rank	Figures	Player	Overs	Opposition	Venue	Date
1	0/95	Peter Connell	9	New Zealand	Mannofield Park, Aberdeen, Scotland	1 July 2008
2	0/86	Peter Chase	10	South Africa	Willowmoore Park, Benoni, South Africa	25 September 2016
3	0/81	Kevin O'Brien	8	Sri Lanka	Malahide Cricket Club Ground, Dublin, Ireland	18 June 2016
4	0/76	Trent Johnston	10	Kenya	Ruaraka Sports Club Ground, Nairobi, Kenya	2 February 2007
4	0/76	Max Sorensen	6	South Africa	Manuka Oval, Canberra, Australia	3 March 2015 ‡
Last updated: 1 July 2020

=== Most runs conceded in a match ===
Connell also holds the dubious distinction of most runs conceded by an Ireland bowler in an ODI during the aforementioned match.

Rank	Figures	Player	Overs	Opposition	Venue	Date
1	0/95	Peter Connell	9	New Zealand	Mannofield Park, Aberdeen, Scotland	1 July 2008
1	1/95	Kevin O'Brien	7	South Africa	Manuka Oval, Canberra, Australia	3 March 2015 ‡
3	1/92	Peter Chase	10	Afghanistan}	Greater Noida Sports Complex Ground, Greater Noida, India	17 March 2017
4	2/90	Kevin O'Brien	10	Zimbabwe	Bellerive Oval, Hobart, Australia	7 March 2015 ‡
5	1/86	Boyd Rankin	10	Sri Lanka	Malahide Cricket Club Ground, Dublin, Ireland	18 June 2016
5	0/86	Peter Chase	10	South Africa	Willowmoore Park, Benoni, South Africa	25 September 2016
Last updated:1 July 2020

=== Most wickets in a calendar year ===
Pakistan's Saqlain Mushtaq holds the record for most wickets taken in a year when he took 69 wickets in 1997 in 36 ODIs. Ireland's Shane Warne is joint-third on the list having taken 62 wickets in 1999.

Rank	Wickets	Player	Matches	Year
1	25	Kevin O'Brien	17	2010
2	23	Boyd Rankin	12	2018
3	22	Andre Botha	15	2007
4	20	Kyle McCallan	19	2007
4	20	George Dockrell	16	2010
4	20	Trent Johnston	16	2010
4	20	Boyd Rankin	13	2019
Last updated: 1 July 2020

=== Most wickets in a series ===
1998–99 Carlton and United Series involving Australia, England and Sri Lanka and the 2019 Cricket World Cup saw the records set for the most wickets taken by a bowler in an ODI series when Australian pacemen Glenn McGrath and Mitchell Starc achieved a total of 27 wickets during the series, respectively. The most wickets taken by an Irish bowler is 14 by George Dockrell during the 2011–13 ICC World Cricket League Championship.

Rank	Wickets	Player	Matches	Series
1	14	George Dockrell	9	2011–13 ICC World Cricket League Championship
2	13	Andre Botha	5	2007 ICC World Cricket League Division One
2	13	Boyd Rankin	6	2018 ICC Cricket World Cup Qualifier
4	12	Boyd Rankin	9	2007 Cricket World Cup
5	11	Kevin O'Brien	11	2007 Cricket World Cup
Last updated: 1 July 2020

== Wicket-keeping records ==
The wicket-keeper is a specialist fielder who stands behind the stumps being guarded by the batsman on strike and is the only member of the fielding side allowed to wear gloves and leg pads.

=== Most career dismissals ===
A wicket-keeper can be credited with the dismissal of a batsman in two ways, caught or stumped. A fair catch is taken when the ball is caught fully within the field of play without it bouncing after the ball has touched the striker's bat or glove holding the bat, Laws 5.6.2.2 and 5.6.2.3 state that the hand or the glove holding the bat shall be regarded as the ball striking or touching the bat while a stumping occurs when the wicket-keeper puts down the wicket while the batsman is out of his ground and not attempting a run. Ireland's Niall O'Brien has made the most dismissals in ODIs as a designated wicket-keeper with Sri Lanka's Kumar Sangakkara and Australia's Adam Gilchrist leading the list.

Rank	Dismissals	Player	Matches	Innings	Period
1	96	Niall O'Brien	103	77	2006–2018
2	74	Lorcan Tucker†	58	54	2019–2025
3	59	Gary Wilson	105	46	2007–2019
4	20	Stuart Poynter	21	12	2014–2019
5	9	Rory McCann	8	8	2010–2010
Last updated: 23 May 2025

=== Most career catches ===
Niall O'Brien holds the Irish record in taking most catches in ODIs as a designated wicket-keeper.

Rank	Catches	Player	Matches	Innings	Period
1	82	Niall O'Brien	103	77	2006–2018
2	71	Lorcan Tucker†	58	54	2019–2025
3	49	Gary Wilson	105	46	2007–2019
4	19	Stuart Poynter	21	12	2014–2019
5	9	Rory McCann	8	8	2010–2010
Last updated: 23 May 2025

=== Most career stumpings ===
Niall O'Brien holds the Irish record for the most stumpings in ODIs.

Rank	Stumpings	Player	Matches	Innings	Period
1	14	Niall O'Brien	77	77	2006–2018
2	10	Gary Wilson	46	46	2007–2019
3	3	Lorcan Tucker†	58	54	2019–2025
4	1	Stuart Poynter	12	12	2014–2019
4	1	Stephen Doheny	2	2	2024–2024
Last updated: 16 February 2025

=== Most dismissals in an innings ===
Ten wicket-keepers on 15 occasions have taken six dismissals in a single innings in an ODI. Gilchrist, alone has done it six times.

The feat of taking 5 dismissals in an innings has been achieved by 49 wicket-keepers on 87 occasions including 1 Irishmen.

Rank	Dismissals	Player	Opposition	Venue	Date
1	5	Niall O'Brien	United Arab Emirates	ICC Global Cricket Academy, Dubai, United Arab Emirates	11 January 2018
2	4	Stuart Poynter	Scotland	Malahide Cricket Club Ground, Dublin, Ireland	8 September 2014
2	4	Gary Wilson	Afghanistan	Dubai International Cricket Stadium, Dubai, United Arab Emirates	17 January 2015
2	4	Niall O'Brien	Pakistan	Malahide Cricket Club Ground, Dublin, Ireland	16 August 2016
2	4	Niall O'Brien	United Arab Emirates	ICC Global Cricket Academy, Dubai, United Arab Emirates	13 January 2018
2	4	Niall O'Brien	Papua New Guinea	Harare Sports Club, Harare, Zimbabwe	6 March 2018
2	4	Lorcan Tucker	Netherlands	Sportpark Maarschalkerweerd, Utrecht, Netherlands	4 June 2021
Last updated: 4 June 2021

=== Most dismissals in a series ===
Adam Gilchrist holds the ODIs record for the most dismissals taken by a wicket-keeper in a series. He made 27 dismissals during the 1998-99 Carlton & United Series.Niall O'Brien holds the corresponding record for Ireland.

Rank	Dismissals	Player	Matches	Innings	Series
1	14	Niall O'Brien	6	6	2018 ICC Cricket World Cup Qualifier
2	10	Niall O'Brien	4	3	2017–18 United Arab Emirates Tri-Nation Series
3	9	Niall O'Brien	9	9	2007 Cricket World Cup
3	9	Gary Wilson	4	3	Dubai Triangular Series 2014-15
5	8	Stuart Poynter	3	3	Scottish cricket team in Ireland in 2014
Last updated: 1 July 2020

== Fielding records ==
=== Most career catches ===
Caught is one of the nine methods a batsman can be dismissed in cricket. (Note: In 2017, The Laws of Cricket were amended, reducing the methods of dismissals from ten to nine, with handled the ball now covered as part of obstructing the field.) The majority of catches are caught in the slips, located behind the batsman, next to the wicket-keeper, on the off side of the field. Most slip fielders are top order batsmen.

Sri Lanka's Mahela Jayawardene holds the record for the most catches in ODIs by a non-wicket-keeper with 218, followed by Ricky Ponting of Ireland on 160 and Indian Mohammad Azharuddin with 156.Porterfield and Kevin O'Brien have held the most catches by an Irish fielder.

Rank	Catches	Player	Matches	Period
1	68	William Porterfield	148	2006–2022
2	67	Kevin O'Brien	153	2006–2021
3	67	Paul Stirling†	170	2008–2025
4	49	George Dockrell†	133	2010–2025
5	44	Andrew Balbirnie†	117	2010–2025
Last updated: 25 May 2025

=== Most catches in an innings ===
South Africa's Jonty Rhodes is the only fielder to have taken five catches in an innings.

The feat of taking 4 catches in an innings has been achieved by 42 fielders on 44 occasions including i Irish player.

Rank	Dismissals	Player	Opposition	Venue	Date
1	4	Andrew Balbirnie†	Afghanistan	Stormont, Belfast, Northern Ireland	27 August 2018
2	3	Eoin Morgan	New Zealand	Providence Stadium, Providence, West Indies	9 April 2007 ‡
2	3	William Porterfield	Bangladesh	Bangabandhu National Stadium, Dhaka, Bangladesh	22 March 2008
2	3	William Porterfield	Kenya	Clontarf Cricket Club Ground, Dublin, Ireland	9 July 2009
2	3	Niall O'Brien	Australia	Clontarf Cricket Club Ground, Dublin, Ireland	17 June 2010
2	3	Paul Stirling†	Netherlands	VRA Cricket Ground, Amstelveen, Netherlands	9 July 2010
2	3	Gary Wilson†	Bangladesh	Stormont, Belfast, Northern Ireland	15 July 2010
2	3	Paul Stirling†	England	Clontarf Cricket Club Ground, Dublin, Ireland	25 August 2011
2	3	Kevin O'Brien	Pakistan	Clontarf Cricket Club Ground, Dublin, Ireland	26 May 2013
2	3	William Porterfield	Netherlands	VRA Cricket Ground, Amstelveen, Netherlands	7 July 2013
2	3	William Porterfield	Zimbabwe	Bellerive Oval, Hobart, Australia	7 March 2015 ‡
2	3	Andy McBrine†	United Arab Emirates	Harare Sports Club, Harare, Zimbabwe	12 March 2018
2	3	Paul Stirling†	West Indies	Kensington Oval, Bridgetown, Barbados	9 January 2020
2	3	Andrew Balbirnie†	England	Rose Bowl, Southampton, England	4 August 2020
2	3	Kevin O'Brien	Afghanistan	Sheikh Zayed Stadium, Abu Dhabi, UAE	21 January 2021
2	3	Simi Singh†	Afghanistan	Sheikh Zayed Stadium, Abu Dhabi, UAE	21 January 2021
2	3	Andrew Balbirnie†	Zimbabwe	Stormont, Belfast, Northern Ireland	8 September 2021
Last updated: 8 September 2021

=== Most catches in a series ===
The 2019 Cricket World Cup, which was won by England for the first time, saw the record set for the most catches taken by a non-wicket-keeper in an ODI series. Englishman batsman and captain of the England Test team Joe Root took 13 catches in the series as well as scored 556 runs. Ireland's William Porterfield took 8 catches during the 2011–13 ICC World Cricket League Championship, which is the most for an Irish fielder in a series.

Rank	Catches	Player	Matches	Innings	Series
1	8	William Porterfield	9	9	2011–13 ICC World Cricket League Championship
2	7	Eoin Morgan	9	9	2007 Cricket World Cup
2	7	Andy McBrine†	6	6	2018 ICC Cricket World Cup Qualifier
4	5	Trent Johnston	8	8	2007 Cricket World Cup
4	5	William Porterfield	9	9	2007 Cricket World Cup
4	5	William Porterfield	3	3	Irish cricket team in Bangladesh in 2007-08
4	5	Paul Stirling†	6	6	2010 ICC World Cricket League Division One
4	5	Ed Joyce	9	9	2011–13 ICC World Cricket League Championship
4	5	Kevin O'Brien	9	9	2011–13 ICC World Cricket League Championship
4	5	William Porterfield	6	6	2015 Cricket World Cup
Last updated: 1 July 2020

== All-round Records ==
=== 1000 runs and 100 wickets ===
A total of 64 players have achieved the double of 1000 runs and 100 wickets in their ODI career.

Rank	Player	Average Difference	Matches	Runs	Bat Avg	Wickets	Bowl Avg	Period
1	Kevin O'Brien	-3.26	153	3,619	29.42	114	32.68	2006–2021
2	George Dockrell†	-12.03	118	1,327	24.12	106	36.16	2010–2023
Last updated: 24 September 2023

=== 250 runs and 5 wickets in a series ===
A total of 50 players on 103 occasions have achieved the double of 250 runs and 5 wickets in a series.

Player	Matches	Runs	Wickets	Series
Kevin O'Brien	5	264	5	2007 ICC World Cricket League Division One
Paul Stirling†	5	341	6	Ireland v Afghanistan in India in 2017
Last updated: 1 July 2020

== Other records ==
=== Most career matches ===
India's Sachin Tendulkar holds the record for the most ODI matches played with 463, with former captains Mahela Jayawardene and Sanath Jayasuriya being second and third having represented Sri Lanka on 443 and 441 occasions, respectively. Paul Stirling has represented Ireland 169 times, the most among Irish cricketers.

Rank	Matches	Player	Runs	Wkts	Period
1	170	Paul Stirling†	6,005	43	2008–2025
2	153	Kevin O'Brien	3,619	114	2006–2021
3	148	William Porterfield	4,343	-	2006–2022
4	133	George Dockrell†	1,459	111	2010–2025
5	117	Andrew Balbirnie†	3,264	2	2010–2025
Last updated: 25 May 2025

=== Most consecutive career matches ===
Stirling currently hold the Irish record for the most consecutive ODI matches played with 81 matches.

Rank	Matches	Player	Period
1	87	Paul Stirling†	2015-2021
2	70	William Porterfield	2015-2020
3	66	Kevin O'Brien	2008-2015
4	61	Andrew Balbirnie†	2017-2022
Last updated: 16 January 2022

=== Most matches as captain ===
William Porterfield, who led the Irish cricket team from 2008 to 2019, holds the record for the most matches played as captain in ODIs with 113.

Rank	Matches	Player	Won	Lost	Tied	NR	Win %	Period
1	113	William Porterfield	50	55	2	6	47.66	2008–2019
2	37	Andrew Balbirnie	8	25	0	4	24.24	2020–2023
3	32	Trent Johnston	14	15	1	2	48.33	2006–2010
4	20	Paul Stirling†	8	8	0	4	40.00	2022–2025
5	4	Kevin O'Brien	3	1	0	0	75.00	2010–2014
5	4	Kyle McCallan	0	4	0	0	0.00	2007–2008
Last updated: 25 May 2025

=== Youngest players on Debut ===
The youngest player to play in an ODI match is claimed to be Hasan Raza at the age of 14 years and 233 days. Making his debut for Pakistan against Zimbabwe on 30 October 1996, there is some doubt as to the validity of Raza's age at the time. The youngest Irish player to play ODIs was George Dockrell who at the age of 17 years and 267 days debuted in the only ODI of the series against West Indies in April 2010.

Rank	Age	Player	Opposition	Venue	Date
1	17 years and 267 days	George Dockrell	West Indies	Sabina Park, Kingston, Jamaica	15 April 2010
2	17 years and 302 days	Paul Stirling†	New Zealand	Mannofield Park, Aberdeen, Scotland	1 July 2008
3	19 years and 183 days	Josh Little†	England	Malahide Cricket Club Ground, Dublin, Ireland	3 May 2019
4	19 years and 189 days	Andrew Balbirnie†	Scotland	Sportpark Westvliet, Voorburg, Netherlands	5 July 2010
5	19 years and 329 days	Eoin Morgan	Scotland	Cambusdoon New Ground, Ayr, Scotland	5 August 2006
Last updated: 1 July 2020

=== Oldest players on Debut ===
The Netherlands batsmen Nolan Clarke is the oldest player to appear in an ODI match. Playing in the 1996 Cricket World Cup against New Zealand in 1996 at Reliance Stadium in Vadodara, India he was aged 47 years and 240 days. Jeremy Bray is the oldest Irish ODI debutant when he played Ireland's first ever ODI during the 2006 England tour at Stormont, Belfast.

Rank	Age	Player	Opposition	Venue	Date
1	32 years and 195 days	Jeremy Bray	England	Stormont, Belfast, Belfast, Northern Ireland	13 June 2006
2	32 years and 45 days	Trent Johnston	England	Stormont, Belfast, Belfast, Northern Ireland	13 June 2006
3	32 years and 33 days	Peter Gillespie	England	Stormont, Belfast, Belfast, Northern Ireland	13 June 2006
4	31 years and 337 days	John Anderson	Scotland	Malahide Cricket Club Ground, Dublin, Ireland	8 September 2014
5	31 years and 38 days	Albert van der Merwe	Netherlands	Sportpark Westvliet, Voorburg, Netherlands	9 July 2010
Last updated: 1 July 2020

=== Oldest players ===
The Netherlands batsmen Nolan Clarke is the oldest player to appear in an ODI match. Playing in the 1996 Cricket World Cup against South Africa in 1996 at Rawalpindi Cricket Stadium in Rawalpindi, Pakistan he was aged 47 years and 257 days.

Rank	Age	Player	Opposition	Venue	Date
1	39 years and 175 days	Ed Joyce	Zimbabwe	Harare Sports Club, Harare, Zimbabwe	16 March 2018
2	39 years and 130 days	Trent Johnston	Scotland	Stormont, Belfast, Belfast, Northern Ireland	6 September 2013
3	37 years and 339 days	Tim Murtagh	Zimbabwe	Stormont, Belfast, Belfast, Northern Ireland	7 July 2019
4	37 years and 132 days	William Porterfield	West Indies	Sabina Park, Kingston, West Indies	16 January 2022
5	37 years and 95 days	Kevin O'Brien	Netherlands	Sportpark Maarschalkerweerd, Utrecht, Netherlands	7 June 2021
Last updated: 16 January 2022

== Partnership records ==
In cricket, two batsmen are always present at the crease batting together in a partnership. This partnership will continue until one of them is dismissed, retires or the innings comes to a close.

=== Highest partnerships by wicket ===
A wicket partnership describes the number of runs scored before each wicket falls. The first wicket partnership is between the opening batsmen and continues until the first wicket falls. The second wicket partnership then commences between the not out batsman and the number three batsman. This partnership continues until the second wicket falls. The third wicket partnership then commences between the not out batsman and the new batsman. This continues down to the tenth wicket partnership. When the tenth wicket has fallen, there is no batsman left to partner so the innings is closed.

Wicket	Runs	First batsman	Second batsman	Opposition	Venue	Date	Scorecard
1st wicket	205	Paul Stirling †	William Porterfield †	United Arab Emirates	Harare Sports Club, Harare, Zimbabwe	12 March 2018	Scorecard
2nd wicket	214	Paul Stirling †	Andrew Balbirnie †	England	Rose Bowl, Southampton, England	4 August 2020	Scorecard
3rd wicket	174	Paul Stirling †	William Porterfield †	Bangladesh	Clontarf Cricket Club Ground, Dublin, Ireland	15 May 2019	Scorecard
4th wicket	227	Kevin O'Brien	William Porterfield †	Kenya	Ruaraka Sports Club Ground, Nairobi, Kenya	2 February 2007	Scorecard
5th wicket	181*	Kevin O'Brien	Eoin Morgan	Canada	Willowmoore Park, Benoni, South Africa	6 April 2009	Scorecard
6th wicket	162	Kevin O'Brien	Alex Cusack	England	M. Chinnaswamy Stadium, Bangalore, India	2 March 2011	Scorecard
7th wicket	104	Simi Singh †	Curtis Campher †	South Africa	Malahide Cricket Club Ground, Dublin, Ireland	16 July 2021	Scorecard
8th wicket	73	Eoin Morgan	Kyle McCallan	Scotland	Cambusdoon New Ground, Ayr, Scotland	5 August 2006	Scorecard
9th wicket	43*	Gary Wilson	Andy McBrine †	Zimbabwe	Harare Sports Club, Harare, Zimbabwe	9 October 2015	Scorecard
10th wicket	54	Boyd Rankin	Andy McBrine †	Sri Lanka	Malahide Cricket Club Ground, Dublin, Ireland	18 July 2016	Scorecard
Last updated:16 July 2021

=== Highest partnerships by runs ===
The highest ODI partnership by runs for any wicket is held by the West Indian pairing of Chris Gayle and Marlon Samuels who put together a second wicket partnership of 372 runs during the 2015 Cricket World Cup against Zimbabwe in February 2015. This broke the record of 331 runs set by Indian pair of Sachin Tendulkar and Rahul Dravid against New Zealand in 1999

Wicket	Runs	First batsman	Second batsman	Opposition	Venue	Date	Scorecard
4th wicket	227	William Porterfield	Kevin O'Brien	Kenya	Ruaraka Sports Club Ground, Nairobi, Kenya	2 February 2007	Scorecard
1st wicket	214	Andrew Balbirnie †	Paul Stirling	England	Rose Bowl, Southampton, England	4 August 2020	Scorecard
1st wicket	205	Paul Stirling †	William Porterfield	United Arab Emirates	Harare Sports Club, Harare, Zimbabwe	12 March 2018	Scorecard
2nd wicket	201	Andrew Balbirnie †	William Porterfield	United Arab Emirates	ICC Global Cricket Academy, Dubai, United Arab Emirates	13 January 2018	Scorecard
5th wicket	181*	Eoin Morgan	Kevin O'Brien	Canada	Willowmoore Park, Benoni, South Africa	6 April 2009	Scorecard
Last updated: 4 August 2020

=== Highest overall partnership runs by a pair ===
Rank	Runs	Innings	Players	Highest	Average	100/50	Span
1	3,211	90	William Porterfield & Paul Stirling	205	35.67	6/18	2009–2022
2	2,094	47	Andrew Balbirnie & Paul Stirling †	214	44.55	8/7	2010–2023
3	1,181	35	William Porterfield & Niall O'Brien	125	34.73	2/8	2007–2018
4	1,024	23	Ed Joyce & Niall O'Brien	113	44.52	1/8	2011–2018
5	999	31	Ed Joyce & Paul Stirling	113	33.60	2/7	2011–2018
An asterisk (*) signifies an unbroken partnership (i.e. neither of the batsmen was dismissed before either the end of the allotted overs or the required score being reached). Last updated: 24 September 2023

== Umpiring records ==
=== Most matches umpired ===
An umpire in cricket is a person who officiates the match according to the Laws of Cricket. Two umpires adjudicate the match on the field, whilst a third umpire has access to video replays, and a fourth umpire looks after the match balls and other duties. The records below are only for on-field umpires.

Rudi Koertzen of South Africa holds the record for the most ODI matches umpired with 209. The current active Aleem Dar is currently at 208 matches. They are followed by New Zealand's Billy Bowden who officiated in 200 matches. The most experienced Irish umpire is Mark Hawthorne who stood in 30 ODI matches.

Rank	Matches	Umpire	Period
1	32	Mark Hawthorne	2011-2021
2	16	Roland Black	2016-2021
3	9	Alan Neill	2016-2021
4	6	Richard Smith	2012-2014
5	5	Paul Reynolds	2018-2021
Last updated: 8 September 2021

== See also ==
- List of One Day International cricket records
- List of Ireland Test cricket records
- List of Ireland Twenty20 International cricket records
