= English cricket team in Ireland in 2009 =

England cricket team in Ireland in 2009
- Date: 27 August 2009
- Location: Civil Service Cricket Club Ground, Belfast
- Result: England won the only ODI
- Player of the series: Trent Johnston (Ire)
Teams
- Ireland: England
Captains
- William Porterfield: Paul Collingwood
Most runs
- Joe Denly (67) Luke Wright (36) Matt Prior (29): Paul Stirling (30); Trent Johnston (21*); Andre Botha (15)
Most wickets
- Trent Johnston (4) Andre Botha (2) Alex Cusack (2): Owais Shah (3); Tim Bresnan (2); Adil Rashid (1)

The England cricket team visited Ireland in 2009 to play one One Day International (ODI) as a warm-up for the ODI series against Australia.

== Squads ==
Ireland	England
William Porterfield (c)	Paul Collingwood (c)
Andre Botha	James Anderson
Alex Cusack	Ravi Bopara
Trent Johnston	Tim Bresnan
Kyle McCallan	Stuart Broad
John Mooney	Joe Denly
Kevin O'Brien	Eoin Morgan
Niall O'Brien (wk)	Matt Prior (wk)
Boyd Rankin	Adil Rashid
Paul Stirling	Owais Shah
Regan West	Ryan Sidebottom
Andrew White	Graeme Swann
Gary Wilson (wk)	Jonathan Trott
	Luke Wright

== Only ODI ==
27 August 2009
Scorecard

England; 203/9 (50 overs)	v	Ireland; 113/9 (20 overs)
JL Denly 67 (111); DT Johnston 4/26 [10]		PR Stirling 30 (26); OA Shah 3/16 [3]

England won by 3 runs (D/L)
Civil Service Cricket Club Ground, Belfast
Umpires: Asad Rauf (Pak) and PK Baldwin (Ger)
Player of the match: DT Johnston (Ire)

- Rain during the England innings delayed the innings interval by 15 minutes, and delayed the start of the Ireland innings until 17:30, reducing the innings to 20 overs

England won the toss and chose to bat, but only added two runs before losing Ravi Bopara for a duck in the third over. Debutant Jonathan Trott then followed two overs later without troubling the scorers. Fellow debutant Joe Denly and wicket-keeper Matt Prior struck up a good partnership for the third wicket, adding 53 runs, but Prior was tempted into a big shot by Andre Botha and caught at long leg by Regan West. By the half-way stage of the innings, England were only on 73/3, far below the typical scoring rate for an ODI. Paul Collingwood was the next to fall, hitting the ball skywards as he attempted a big shot off West, and Owais Shah followed suit soon after, caught at cover while attempting a slog. Meanwhile, Denly had reached his maiden ODI half-century off 89 balls to take England past the 100-run mark, but he was out for 67 in the 39th over. Luke Wright then came in and picked up the baton dropped by Denly, making a quick-fire 36 runs off 26 deliveries before becoming Trent Johnston's fourth wicket of the innings. The England tail added another 26 runs for two more wickets to finish the innings at 203/9.

A prolonged spell of rain during the interval meant that play did not resume until 17:30, and Ireland's innings had to be reduced to 20 overs, with a revised target of 116 runs. Tim Bresnan struck first for England, removing Ireland captain William Porterfield and wicket-keeper Niall O'Brien with almost identical dismissals, both batsmen cutting to Paul Collingwood at point. The next two wickets fell to spin as Graeme Swann trapped Andre Botha LBW for 15 before Adil Rashid caught-and-bowled Ireland's top scorer, Paul Stirling, for 30 runs. Five wickets then fell in four overs to leave Ireland at 94/9 with just two overs left to play. Trent Johnston hit 21 runs off 15 balls but his effort was not enough to secure the win for Ireland as they fell two runs short.
