= Irish cricket team in Bangladesh in 2007–08 =

Irish cricket team in Bangladesh in 2008
	Bangladesh	Ireland
- Dates: March 18 – March 22
Captains	Mohammad Ashraful	Trent Johnston

One Day International series
- Results: Bangladesh won the 3-match series 3–0
Most runs	Shahriar Nafees 204; Tamim Iqbal 188; Mohammad Ashraful 124	Niall O'Brien 103; Alex Cusack 73; Reinhardt Strydom 60
Most wickets	Farhad Reza 6 Shakib Al Hasan & Abdur Razzak 5	Dave Langford-Smith 7 Alex Cusack & Kevin O'Brien 2
- Player of the series: Shahriar Nafees (BAN)

The Ireland cricket team toured Bangladesh in March 2008 and played three One Day Internationals (ODIs).

== Squads ==
ODI Squads
Bangladesh	Ireland
Mohammad Ashraful (c)	Trent Johnston (c)
Dhiman Ghosh (wk)	Niall O'Brien (wk)
Abdur Razzak	William Porterfield
Aftab Ahmed	Andre Botha
Farhad Reza	Alex Cusack
Junaid Siddique	Phil Eaglestone
Mahmudullah	Thinus Fourie
Mashrafe Mortaza	Gary Kidd
Nazimuddin	Dave Langford-Smith
Raqibul Hasan	Kyle McCallan
Shahadat Hossain	Eoin Morgan
Shahriar Nafees	Kevin O'Brien
Shakib Al Hasan	Paul Stirling
Tamim Iqbal	Reinhardt Strydom
	Greg Thompson

== Matches ==
=== ODI series ===
==== 1st ODI ====
18 March
(scorecard)

Ireland; 185/7 (50 overs)	v	Bangladesh; 186/2 (39.5 overs)
Alex Cusack 38 (61); Mashrafe Mortaza 3/22 (10 overs)		Shahriar Nafees 90* (121); Trent Johnston 1/17 (6 overs)

Bangladesh win by 8 wickets
Mirpur, Bangladesh
Umpires: Enamul Haque (BAN) & Tyron Wijewardene (SRI)
Player of the match: Mashrafe Mortaza (BAN)

==== 2nd ODI ====
20 March
(scorecard)

Bangladesh; 246/8 (50 overs)	v	Ireland; 162 (38.3 overs)
Aftab Ahmed 61 (57); Dave Langford-Smith 3/43 (10 overs)		Andre Botha 34 (36); Farhad Reza 5/42 (10 overs)

Bangladesh win by 84 runs
Mirpur, Bangladesh
Umpires: Nadir Shah (BAN) & Tyron Wijewardene (SRI)
Player of the match: Farhad Reza (BAN)

==== 3rd ODI ====
22 March
(scorecard)

Bangladesh; 293/7 (50 overs)	v	Ireland; 214 (45.3 overs)
Tamim Iqbal 129 (136); Dave Langford-Smith 3/53 (7 overs)		Niall O'Brien 70 (74); Shakib Al Hasan 2/46 (10 overs)

Bangladesh won by 79 runs
Mirpur, Bangladesh
Umpires: Enamul Haque (BAN) & Tyron Wijewardene (SRI)
Player of the match: Tamim Iqbal (BAN)
