= English cricket team in Ireland in 2006 =

Cricket tour

England cricket team in Ireland in 2006
	England	Ireland
- Dates: 13 June 2006
Captains	Andrew Strauss	Trent Johnston

One Day International series
- Results: England won the 1-match series 1–0
Most runs	Marcus Trescothick (113)	Andre Botha (52)
Most wickets	Steve Harmison (3)	Dave Langford-Smith (3); John Mooney (3)
- Player of the series: Marcus Trescothick

The England cricket team toured Ireland for a one-off One Day International match on 13 June 2006.

This was Ireland's first ever One Day International.

== Lead-up ==
After finishing in second place in the 2005 ICC Trophy Ireland were awarded temporary ODI status and qualification to the 2007 Cricket World Cup.

In November 2005 the Irish Cricket Union (now Cricket Ireland) announced that England would be the team's first opponent in an official ODI. Chief Executive of the Union, Peter Thompson, said that "A match against England, our nearest Test Nation has long been the desire of everyone associated with cricket in Ireland...".

England named a 15-man squad for both the game against Ireland and the upcoming five match ODI series against Sri Lanka.

Ed Joyce had been a crucial member of Ireland's 2005 team that secured them World Cup qualification, finishing as their top scorer in the ICC Trophy campaign. However he had decided that the tournament would be his last for Ireland as he attempted to qualify to play Test cricket for England. Joyce was ultimately successful in receiving an England call-up, although his debut would now be against the country of his birth.

== Squads ==
ODI
Ireland	England
Trent Johnston (c); Andre Botha; Jeremy Bray; Peter Gillespie; Dominick Joyce; David Langford-Smith; Kyle McCallan; John Mooney; Paul Mooney; ~~Eoin Morgan~~; Kevin O’Brien; Andrew White; ~~Niall O’Brien~~; William Porterfield‡	Andrew Strauss (c); Ian Bell; Tim Bresnan; Glen Chapple; Paul Collingwood; Alastair Cook; Jamie Dalrymple; Steve Harmison; Geraint Jones; Ed Joyce; Alex Loudon; Sajid Mahmood; Kevin Pietersen; Liam Plunkett; Marcus Trescothick

‡ William Porterfield was called into the squad after both Eoin Morgan and Niall O'Brien were not released by their county teams, Middlesex and Kent respectively.

== ODI series ==
=== Only ODI ===
13 June 2006
Scorecard

England; 301/7 (50 overs)	v	Ireland; 263/9 (50 overs)
Marcus Trescothick 113 (114); Dave Langford-Smith 3/63 (10 overs)		Andre Botha 52 (89); Steve Harmison 3/58 (10 overs)

England won by 38 runs
Civil Service Cricket Club Ground, Belfast
Umpires: Darrell Hair (AUS) and Roger Dill (BER)
Player of the match: Marcus Trescothick (ENG)

- Glen Chapple, Jamie Dalrymple and Ed Joyce made their ODI debuts for England. Andre Botha, Andrew White, Dave Langford-Smith, Dom Joyce, Trent Johnston, John Mooney, Jeremy Bray, Kevin O'Brien, Peter Gillespie, Paul Mooney and Kyle McCallan made their ODI debuts for Ireland.

England relied on a century from Marcus Trescothick to set an imposing target of 302 for Ireland to chase. Trescothick dominated the early partnerships with Joyce, Strauss and Collingwood failing to make significant scores. With England on 92/3 after 14 overs Trescothick was joined at the crease by Ian Bell, the two would combine for a match winning fourth-wicket stand of 142. Both would fall to John Mooney as England lost 4 wickets in the last ten overs but Geraint Jones and Glen Chapple upped the scoring rate enough to take England past the 300 mark.

Having lost Dom Joyce in the first over of their reply, Ireland had positioned themselves well at 60/1 after ten overs thanks to a half-century partnership between Andre Botha and Jeremy Bray. Scoring slowed down following Bray's dismissal, but Botha put together another half-century partnership with Kyle McCallan to keep Ireland in the match. The loss of 4 wickets in 4 overs to Paul Collingwood and Steve Harmison took the game away from Ireland who, despite some late-order hitting, would fall short of their target.
