= Kenyan cricket team in Ireland in 2008 =

Kenyan cricket in Ireland in 2008
	Kenya	Ireland
- Dates: 24 August 2008 – 27 August 2008
Captains	Steve Tikolo	William Porterfield

One Day International series
- Results: Ireland won the 3-match series 1–0
Most runs	Jimmy Kamande 33; Morris Ouma 25; Alex Obanda 18	Alex Cusack 35; Andre Botha 33; Andrew White 25
Most wickets	Peter Ongondo & Jimmy Kamande 3 Tony Suji & Hiren Varaiya 2	Andre Botha 4 Kyle McCallan & Boyd Rankin 2

The Kenya national cricket team toured Ireland in 2008. They played three One Day Internationals against Ireland.

== ODI series ==
=== 1st ODI ===
24 August
(scorecard)

Ireland; 148/9 (50 overs)	v	Kenya; 115 (39 overs)
Alex Cusack 35 (68); Jimmy Kamande 3/33 (10 overs)		Jimmy Kamande 33 (87); Andre Botha 4/19 (8 overs)

Ireland won by 33 runs.
Civil Service Cricket Club, Stormont, Belfast
Umpires: Peter Hartley (ENG) & Ian Ramage (SCO)

=== 2nd ODI ===
25 August
(scorecard)

Ireland; 18/2 (8 overs)	v	Kenya
Andre Botha 11* (19); Peter Ongondo 1/7 (4 overs)

No result
Civil Service Cricket Club, Stormont, Belfast
Umpires: Peter Hartley (ENG) & Ian Ramage (SCO)

- Match abandoned due to rain.

=== 3rd ODI ===
27 August
(scorecard)

Kenya	v	Ireland

Match abandoned without a ball bowled.
Civil Service Cricket Club, Stormont, Belfast
Umpires: Peter Hartley (ENG) & Ian Ramage (SCO)

- Match abandoned due to rain.
