= Bangladeshi cricket team in Ireland in 2010 =

Bangladesh cricket team in Ireland in 2010
	Bangladesh	Ireland
- Dates: 15 July – 16 July 2010
Captains	Mashrafe Mortaza	William Porterfield

One Day International series
- Results: 2-match series drawn 1–1
Most runs	Junaid Siddique (313)	William Porterfield (314)
Most wickets	Shafiul Islam (4)	Trent Johnston (3)

The Bangladesh national cricket team toured Ireland from 15 to 16 July 2010, playing two One Day International matches. Ireland were victorious in the first ODI by 7 wickets, which marked their third ODI victory over a full member and their second over Bangladesh. Bangladesh won the second ODI by 6 wickets to draw the two-match series.

== ODI series ==
=== 1st ODI ===
15 July 2010
(scorecard)

Bangladesh; 234/9 (50 overs)	v	Ireland; 235/3 (46 overs)
Junaid Siddique 100 (123); Boyd Rankin 3/43 (10 overs)		William Porterfield 108 (116); Abdur Razzak 1/47 (10 overs)

Ireland won by 7 wickets
Civil Service Cricket Club, Stormont, Belfast
Umpires: Kumar Dharmasena (SL) and Norman Malcolm (WI)
Player of the match: William Porterfield (Ire)

- Ireland won the toss and elected to field.

=== 2nd ODI ===
16 July 2010
(scorecard)

Ireland; 189/9 (46 overs)	v	Bangladesh; 191/4 (37.4 overs)
Gary Wilson 60 (64); Shafiul Islam 4/55 (9 overs)		Tamim Iqbal 74 (91); Andrew White 1/10 (5 overs)

Bangladesh won by 6 wickets (D/L)
Civil Service Cricket Club, Stormont, Belfast
Umpires: Kumar Dharmasena (SL) and Norman Malcolm (WI)
Player of the match: Tamim Iqbal (Ban)

- Ireland won the toss and elected to bat.
- Rain reduced the match to 46 overs per side.
