= Irish cricket team in the West Indies in 2009–10 =

Irish cricket team in the West Indies in 2010
	Ireland	West Indies
- Dates: April 3 – April 18, 2010
Captains	William Porterfield	Chris Gayle

One Day International series
- Results: West Indies won the 1-match series 1–0
Most runs	Kevin O'Brien (54)	Ramnaresh Sarwan (100)
Most wickets	Peter Connell (1)	David Bernard (3)
- Player of the series: Ramnaresh Sarwan (WIN)

The Ireland cricket team toured the West Indies in April 2010. They played one One Day International against the West Indies. They also played three Twenty20 matches against a West Indies XI and a single first-class match against Jamaica.

== 3-day tour match ==
=== Jamaica v Ireland ===
3 April – 5 April
(scorecard)

Jamaica	v	Ireland
339 all out (87.5 overs); David Bernard 102 (164); Peter Connell 4/77 (11.5 overs)		275 all out (90.3 overs); Paul Stirling 65 (112); Andre Russell 4/41 (14.3 overs)
314/7 dec (69 overs); Andre Russell 108 (65); Gary Kidd 3/102 (13 overs)

Match drawn
Chedwin Park, Spanish Town
Umpires: L. Thompson & V. Johnson
Player of the match: (Jamaica) Andre Russell

== ODI series ==
=== Only ODI ===
15 April
Scorecard

Ireland; 219 (50 overs)	v	West Indies; 213/4 (44 overs)
Kevin O'Brien 54 (51); David Bernard 3/32 (10 overs)		Ramnaresh Sarwan 100* (119); Peter Connell 1/25 (8 overs)

West Indies won by 6 wickets (D/L)
Sabina Park, Kingston, Jamaica
Umpires: Norman Malcolm (WIN) & (Scotland) Ian Ramage
Player of the match: Ramnaresh Sarwan (WIN)

- Ireland won the toss and elected to bat.
- Rain stopped play during West Indies's innings. West Indies set a revised target of 213 off 45 overs.

== Twenty20 series ==
=== 1st T20 ===
11 April
Scorecard

West Indies XI; 143/8 (20.0 overs)	v	Ireland; 112/7 (20.0 overs)
N Deonarine 40 (32); DT Johnson 2/19 [4]		DT Johnson 28* (20); SJ Benn 2/12 [4]

West Indies XI won by 31 runs
Trelawny Stadium, Trelawny, Jamaica
Umpires: VG Johnson and NA Malcolm
Player of the match: N Deonarine (WIN)

- West Indies XI won the toss and chose to bat.

=== 2nd T20 ===
17 April
Scorecard

West Indies XI; 171/7 (20.0 overs)	v	Ireland; 153/7 (20.0 overs)
S Chanderpaul 64 (47); AR Cusack 3/19 [3]		NJ O'Brien 62 (44); SJ Benn 3/32 [4]

West Indies XI won by 18 runs
Sabina Park, Kingston, Jamaica
Umpires: P Gustard and Vivian Johnson

- West Indies XI won the toss and chose to bat

=== 3rd T20 ===
18 April
Scorecard

West Indies XI; 152/4 (15.0/15 ov)	v	Ireland; 136/7 (15.0/15 ov)
Ramnaresh Sarwan 52 (27); Peter Connell 1/25 [3]		Trent Johnston 39 (20); Ravi Rampaul 3/26 [3]

West Indies XI won by 16 runs
Sabina Park, Kingston, Jamaica
Umpires: Norman Malcolm and Leeberth Thompson

- Ireland won the toss and chose to field.
