= Irish cricket team in Canada in 2010–11 =

Ireland cricket team in Canada in 2010
	Ireland	Canada
- Dates: 31 August 2010 – 7 September 2010
Captains	Trent Johnston	Ashish Bagai

One Day International series
- Results: 2-match series drawn 1–1
Most runs	Paul Stirling (212)	Ruvindu Gunasekera (130)
Most wickets	Albert van der Merwe (5)	Harvir Baidwan (5)

The Ireland cricket team toured Canada from 31 August - 7 September 2010. They played one first-class match as part of the ICC Intercontinental Cup and two One Day Internationals (ODIs).

== Intercontinental Cup Match ==
31 August - 3 September
(scorecard)

Canada	v	Ireland
120 (32 overs); Zubin Surkari 28 (28); Trent Johnston 5/23 (9 overs)		261 (72 overs); Andrew White 84 (128); Henry Osinde 5/68 (21 overs)
316 (106.5 overs); Ashish Bagai 90 (157); Kevin O'Brien 5/39 (17.5 overs)		176/4 (41.1 overs); Andre Botha 61 (84); Henry Osinde 2/30 (11 overs)

Ireland won by 6 wickets
Toronto Cricket, Skating and Curling Club, Toronto
Umpires: Karran Bayney & Chris Gaffaney (New Zealand)
Player of the match: Andrew White

- Canada won the toss and chose to bat.

== ODI series ==
=== 1st ODI ===
6 September 2010
(scorecard)

Ireland; 175/9 (35 overs)	v	Canada; 163/4 (33 overs)
John Mooney 47 (55); Khurram Chohan 3/25 (6 overs)		Ruvindu Gunasekera 71 (95); Trent Johnston 2/21 (7 overs)

Canada won by 4 runs (D/L)
Toronto Cricket, Skating and Curling Club, Toronto
Umpires: Karran Bayney & Chris Gaffaney (NZ)
Player of the match: Ruvindu Gunasekera (Can)

- Ireland won the toss and elected to bat.
- Match reduced to 35 overs a side because of rain, with the Canada innings reduced further to 33 overs.

=== 2nd ODI ===
7 September 2010
(scorecard)

Ireland; 325/8 (50 overs)	v	Canada; 233 (46.3 overs)
Paul Stirling 177 (134); Jimmy Hansra 3/27 (3 overs)		Ruvindu Gunasekera 59 (60); Albert van der Merwe 5/49 (10 overs)

Ireland won by 92 runs
Toronto Cricket, Skating and Curling Club, Toronto
Umpires: Karran Bayney & Chris Gaffaney (NZ)
Player of the match: Paul Stirling (Ire)

- Canada won the toss and elected to field.
