= Reinhardt Strydom =

South African-born Irish cricketer (born 1977)

Personal information
- Born: 16 June 1977 (age 49); Cape Town, South Africa
- Batting: Left-handed
- Bowling: Left-arm medium-fast
- Role: Batter

International information
- National side: Ireland (2008–2008)
- ODI debut (cap 22): 18 March 2008 v Bangladesh
- Last ODI: 25 August 2008 v Kenya
- T20I debut (cap 9): 2 August 2008 v Scotland
- Last T20I: 5 August 2008 v Netherlands

Career statistics
Competition	ODI	T20I	FC	LA
Matches	9	4	2	22
Runs scored	83	6	34	301
Batting average	13.83	6.00	17.00	16.72
100s/50s	0/0	0/0	0/0	0/0
Top score	37	5*	33	49
Balls bowled	48	–	6	132
Wickets	1	–	0	1
Bowling average	63.00	–	–	139.00
5 wickets in innings	0	–	–	0
10 wickets in match	0	–	–	0
Best bowling	1/63	–	–	1/63
Catches/stumpings	3/–	1/–	0/–	4/–
- Source: Cricinfo, 18 May 2009

Reinhardt Strydom (born 16 June 1977) is a South African-born Irish international cricketer. He is a left-handed batsman and a left-arm medium-fast bowler. He made his ODI debut for Ireland during their tour of Bangladesh in March 2008.

He made his One Day International debut against Bangladesh, on 18 March 2008. He made his Twenty20 International debut against Scotland on 2 August 2008. He made his first-class debut against Netherlands on 9 July 2008.

In February 2008, he was picked to the national team for the Bangladesh series. He scored a half century against Essex in UAE in March 2008.
