= Jeremy Bray (cricketer) =

Irish cricketer and coach (born 1973)

Personal information
- Full name: Jeremy Paul Bray
- Born: 30 November 1973 (age 52); Newtown, Sydney, New South Wales, Australia
- Nickname: Words
- Batting: Left-handed
- Role: Batsman

International information
- National side: Ireland (2004-2009)
- ODI debut (cap 2): 13 June 2006 v England
- Last ODI: 18 April 2007 v Sri Lanka
- ODI shirt no.: 3
- T20I debut (cap 12): 8 June 2009 v Bangladesh
- Last T20I: 10 June 2009 v India
- T20I shirt no.: 6

Domestic team information
- Years: Team
- 1997–1998: New South Wales

Head coaching information
- Years: Team
- 2014–2021: Denmark
- 2021–2022: Vanuatu

Career statistics
Competition	ODIs	T20I	FC	LA
Matches	15	2	12	45
Runs scored	401	2	998	962
Batting average	28.64	1.00	52.52	22.37
100s/50s	2/0	0/0	3/4	2/4
Top score	116	2	190	116
Balls bowled	–	–	109	–
Wickets	–	–	0	–
Bowling average	–	–	–	–
5 wickets in innings	–	–	–	–
10 wickets in match	–	–	–	–
Best bowling	–	–	–	–
Catches/stumpings	6/–	2/0	9/–	24/2
- Source: CricInfo, 29 August 2009

Jeremy Paul Bray (born 30 November 1973) is an Australian-Irish cricket coach and former player. He played as a left-handed top order batsman and part-time wicketkeeper. He grew up in Australia and played for the Australia under-19s and briefly for New South Wales, later moving to Ireland and playing ODIs and Twenty20 Internationals for the national team between 2004 and 2009. Since retiring from playing he has coached Ireland women, Denmark, and Vanuatu.

== Playing career ==
Bray was the Player of the Championships at the 1992–93 Australian Under-19 Cricket Championships in Brisbane and was selected for the Australian Under-19 side, playing two Youth Tests and one Youth ODI. He also played one List A match for New South Wales.

Bray played grade cricket in Sydney for the St. George Cricket Club with his fellow Irish World Cup teammate David Langford-Smith, where he was well known for his aggressive batting approach. Nicknamed "Words" for his talkative nature, Bray later moved to Ireland to continue his cricketing career.

After moving to Ireland, he made his debut for the Ireland cricket team in a C&G Trophy match against Berkshire. He has since gone on to play for Ireland on over 50 occasions. Before Ireland was granted ODI status he played in the European Championships in 2004 and 2006 in addition to the 2005 ICC Trophy.

In the final of the 2006 ICC Intercontinental Cup against Canada, Bray opened the innings for Ireland and made 146. His innings was particularly aggressive as in his 202 run opening stand his partner William Porterfield made just 54.

On 30 January 2007, he became the first ever Irish cricketer to score an ODI century with an innings of 116 against Scotland.

Six weeks later, he scored 115 off 137 balls, on his and Ireland's World Cup debut, against Zimbabwe. The game finished in a tie and he was awarded man of the match for his performance.

After a two years out of the team, Bray was recalled to the Ireland squad when captain William Porterfield was unavailable due to commitments with Gloucestershire County Cricket Club and after Fintan McAllister dropped out. He said "I'm delighted to be involved again. I said some harsh things about Irish cricket two years ago, which I've come to regret deeply ... I feel I've got a good few years left in me, and reckon I can give a good deal of assistance to the talented youngsters in the set up".

== Coaching career ==
On 12 January 2010, Bray announced his retirement from international cricket. He said "I'm not getting any younger, and it's hard to get up to the levels of fitness now required for international cricket ... "I have had some wonderful memories and will always be grateful to Ireland for giving me the opportunity".

Post-career, Bray has been coaching including local A.C.T cricket Club Ginninderra, the ACT Comets and the Irish Women's cricket team. After two years at the helm, including helping gain qualification to the 2014 ICC World Twenty20 tournament, he announced that he would step down as coach of the Irish Women in December, 2013.

Bray was appointed head coach of Denmark in 2014. Having first led them in the 2014 World Cricket League Division 4 where they finished third, he then lead them to the 2015 ICC Europe Division One to try and qualify for the 2015 ICC World Twenty20 Qualifier. They finished in second to Jersey, narrowly missing qualification.

In January 2021, Bray was appointed high performance manager at Vanuatu Cricket and head coach of the Vanuatu national cricket team. He resigned from the role in January 2022, returning to Ireland to coach at The Hills Cricket Club. He was appointed head coach of Munster Reds in January 2023.
