= Civil Service Cricket Club =

Irish cricket club

Civil Service Cricket Club (CSCC) is one of Ireland's oldest cricket clubs. Formed in 1863 in Dublin's Phoenix Park, the club currently has over 40 members and competes in league and cup competitions arranged by the Leinster Cricket Union.

The club's first games were played on the lawn of the Viceregal Lodge (Now Áras an Uachtaráin) in 1863, the same year that the club had its ground donated to it – the ground it still uses today.

== History ==
In the early 1860s, the Lord Lieutenant of Ireland decided that his civil servants needed some quality rest and recreation. He sponsored a Bill through Parliament, granting civil servants a cricket ground in Phoenix Park, beside the Dog Pond, where the Civil Service Cricket Club plays to this day. The club played its first match on the front lawn of the Viceregal Lodge in April 1863.

Back in its early days, the club had trouble fielding sides, or to be more precise, fielding sides punctually. In those days the Civil Service worked on Saturday mornings, and as most matches were played on that day, starting at noon, the club was almost always a late starter. This situation gradually improved as office managers in Dublin Castle and the Custom House developed a blind eye on match days.

The club built a wooden pavilion with a bar in its basement, and attracted visiting sides from all parts of Ireland. Charles Stewart Parnell brought a Wicklow side to Civil Service in the 1870s. Club membership was opened to civil servants’ families and James Penny, the son of a civil servant, was the club's first international. The club produced several Irish international cricketers like George Christian and Paddy Murphy.

Civil Service was at its peak just before the First World War but things were changing, with the Gaelic Athletic Association establishing its dominance. After the Second World War, Civil Service reverted to its junior status and it has since prospered to varying degree. Now, the club's membership includes Australians, Indians, Pakistanis and South Africans. The Civil Service link lives on – club president Fintan Butler, is based in the Office of Public Works and his son Owen, who started his career in Civil Service, later went on to play for Ireland. Aidan Kinsella, who was the captain of the club's second team, is also based in the Office of Public Works.

== Teams ==
Currently Civil Service Cricket club has four teams that compete as follows:

- 1st XI - Premier League
- 2nd XI - 2nd XI Premier League
- 3rd XI - Division 6
- 4th XI - Division 8
- 5th XI - Division 15

== Documentary ==
On 5 July 2006, RTE broadcast a documentary on Civil Service Cricket Club
