= Alex Cusack =

Irish cricketer

Personal information
- Full name: Alex Richard Cusack
- Born: 29 October 1980 (age 46); Brisbane, Queensland, Australia
- Batting: Right-handed
- Bowling: Right arm medium-fast
- Role: All-rounder

International information
- National side: Ireland (2006–2015)
- ODI debut (cap 20): 24 June 2007 v South Africa
- Last ODI: 8 May 2015 v England
- ODI shirt no.: 83
- T20I debut (cap 3): 2 August 2008 v Scotland
- Last T20I: 25 July 2015 v Netherlands
- T20I shirt no.: 83

Career statistics
Competition	ODI	T20I	FC	LA
Matches	59	37	19	87
Runs scored	745	229	852	1,103
Batting average	22.57	15.26	35.50	22.06
100s/50s	0/2	0/1	1/5	0/3
Top score	71	65	130	71
Balls bowled	1,953	606	833	2,939
Wickets	63	35	12	87
Bowling average	23.96	20.40	32.16	25.71
5 wickets in innings	1	0	0	1
10 wickets in match	0	0	0	0
Best bowling	5/20	4/11	4/31	5/20
Catches/stumpings	18/–	7/–	12/–	26/–
- Source: CricketArchive, 9 March 2016

Alex Richard Cusack (born 29 October 1980) is a former Australian-born Irish cricketer. A club cricketer for Clontarf, Cusack was a carpenter by trade until he was awarded a professional contract with the Irish Cricket Union in 2009. He played as a middle-order right-handed batsman who bowled right-arm medium-fast deliveries. Cusack made his international debut in 2007.

In 2009, Cusack became one of the first two players to be given contracts with Cricket Ireland. A year later, the number of cricketers with contracts with CI had increased to six, with Cusack still amongst their number. In the 2011 Cricket World Cup match against England, Cusack was part of the highest sixth wicket partnership in World Cup history, putting on 162 runs with Kevin O'Brien as Ireland defeated England.

In August 2015, Cusack announced his retirement from cricket.

== Youth and early career ==
Born in Brisbane, Australia, on 29 October 1980, Cusack began playing cricket at the age of eight. A versatile player, he played grade cricket and regularly shifted his position in the batting order and bowled a bit. In 2003, at the age of 22, Cusack went to Ireland with the intention of playing a season of club cricket. His brother, who was playing rugby for Old Crescent in Limerick, helped him get in contact with cricket clubs and Cusack ended up playing as a professional for Clontarf. Cusack ended up staying and hoped to break into the Ireland team as he has an Irish passport. He married in December 2008.

== International breakthrough ==
Cusack made his debut for Ireland in a one-day match against Middlesex on 10 June 2007. He bowled two expensive overs, conceding 29 runs, however he did score 29 batting at number six from Ireland's total of 175; Ireland went on to lose the match by six wickets. Trent Johnston, his captain, attributed Cusack's lack of success in his first match to nervousness. However, Cusack was much more effective on his international debut, in which he was named man-of-the-match.

The uncapped Cusack was named in Ireland's squad to face India and South Africa in June 2007; the squad was weakened by the absence of experienced players through commitments to their counties, injuries, and retirements after the 2007 Cricket World Cup. Not selected for the match against India, Cusack took Gary Wilson's place in the side for the match against South Africa on 24 June 2007. In the match, Cusack made his One Day International debut; the seventh bowler used by Trent Johnston, Cusack took three wickets out of Ireland's four in the match. His maiden wicket was that of Morne van Wyk and he also dismissed Jacques Kallis and Herschelle Gibbs. Chasing 174 to win from 31 overs, Cusack top-scored for Ireland with 36 not out (36*) as the team fell 42 runs short of victory. Talking of Cusack's performance, Johnston said "We knew he could make the step up ... he came out there in tough conditions, against quality batsmen with short boundaries and he hit the top of off-stump and showed us how well he could bat ...He's going to be in these Irish colours for a long time and he deserves that".

Cusack also made a successful first class debut in August 2007, scoring 130 against Scotland in Belfast. The match, which ended in a draw, was Ireland's opening match in the 2007–08 ICC Intercontinental Cup. His partnership with Andre Botha in the match for the sixth wicket set a record for Ireland. It beat the team's previous highest sixth wicket partnership broke the record established in 1896 by Daniel Comyn and Drummond Hamilton against I Zingari. It was only Cusack's sixth match for Ireland. In the final of the tournament, Cusack scored 95* alongside centurion Niall O'Brien to help guide Ireland to victory, their third consecutive title in the competition. He was named man-of-the-match for his performance. Cusack finished the tournament with 361 runs from 7 matches at an average of 51.57 and was Ireland's fourth highest run-scorer; he also took 7 wickets at an average of 13.28.

In common with much of the Ireland team, he had a full-time job away from cricket which interfered with the game. By June 2009, Cusack Trent Johnston were the only players to have professional, central contracts with the Irish Cricket Union. The contracts were part of the Irish Cricket Union's initiative to make the Ireland cricket team more professional.

Cusack played in the 2009 ICC World Twenty20, in which Ireland progressed to the super eights. In Ireland's match against Sri Lanka, Cusack almost helped his team to victory by taking 4/18 to restrict Sri Lanka to 144/9. His bowling figures were the best for Ireland in Twenty20 Internationals (T20I). Playing in all five of Ireland's matches, Cusack took 8 wickets at an average of 19.12 in the tournament; he was the equal 12th leading wicket-taker in the tournament, and Ireland's joint leading wicket-taker, in both cases tied with off-spinner Kyle McCallan. With 14 wickets at an average of 13.00, Cusack is Ireland's leading wicket-taker in T20Is. Cusack was one of seven Ireland players to be nominated for the 2009 Associate and Affiliate Player of the Year (there were fourteen nominees in all).

In January 2010 Cricket Ireland, the governing body for cricket in Ireland, awarded Cusack a full-time contract. He was one of six players awarded such contracts with Cricket Ireland, and came just a year after the first professional contracts were awarded to Ireland's cricketers. Before that players were amateurs relying on income from other jobs and playing cricket in their spare time. The contract allowed Cusack and the others to focus on cricket, with the aim of improving ahead of the 2011 World Cup. He was selected in Ireland's 15-man squad for the 2011 World Cup.
