= Dave Langford-Smith =

Irish cricketer

Personal information
- Full name: David Langford-Smith
- Born: 7 December 1976 (age 49); Sydney, Australia
- Batting: Right-handed
- Bowling: Right arm fast-medium

International information
- National side: Ireland
- ODI debut (cap 6): 13 June 2006 v England
- Last ODI: 22 March 2008 v Bangladesh
- ODI shirt no.: 76

Career statistics
Competition	ODI	FC	LA
Matches	22	7	33
Runs scored	142	22	269
Batting average	15.77	11.00	17.93
100s/50s	0/0	0/0	0/0
Top score	31*	15	39
Balls bowled	942	881	1,323
Wickets	25	22	34
Bowling average	31.88	20.31	36.29
5 wickets in innings	0	2	0
10 wickets in match	0	0	0
Best bowling	3/32	5/45	3/32
Catches/stumpings	5/–	4/–	6/–
- Source: CricketArchive, 27 September 2008

David Langford-Smith (born 7 December 1976) is an Australian-born Irish former cricketer, who was the first man to take a wicket in a One Day International for Ireland. A right-handed batsman and right arm fast-medium bowler, he has played 34 times for the Ireland cricket team as of 10 June 2007. Dave also played for, Phoenix Cricket club /, where he is a strong player and is the head coach of all teams. He has Played for Phoenix for several years.

== Cricket career ==
Born 7 December 1976 in Sydney, Langford-Smith's first two Ireland matches were played in June 2005, but he was playing against Ireland for the MCC as Ireland warmed up for the 2005 ICC Trophy. He made his debut for Ireland proper on 23 April 2006, playing against Hampshire in a C&G Trophy match.

He continued playing in the C&G Trophy that year, and made his first-class debut on 17 May 2006 in a 2006 ICC Intercontinental Cup match against Namibia. This was followed by a C&G Trophy match against Middlesex at Lord's and the aforementioned ODI against England in Belfast, which was his and Ireland's first One-Day International.

Langford-Smith then played in the 2006 European Championship in Scotland in August, playing against Denmark, Italy, the Netherlands and Scotland. This was followed by a match against the MCC at Lord's and an Intercontinental Cup match against Scotland in Aberdeen.

Langford-Smith's next matches for Ireland were in Division One of the World Cricket League in Nairobi in early 2007, playing in ODIs against Scotland, Kenya, Canada and the Netherlands. He then played in an Intercontinental Cup match against the UAE in Abu Dhabi before heading to the West Indies to take part in the 2007 Cricket World Cup.

He played in all nine of Ireland's matches in the 2007 World Cup, taking seven wickets, and continued in the Irish side, playing in the 2007 Friends Provident Trophy and in the final of the Intercontinental Cup against Canada. This is his most recent game for Ireland at the time of writing. He was not named in Ireland's squad for their ODIs against India and South Africa in June 2007 due to injury, though he turned out for his club, Phoenix Cricket Club, the day after the squad was announced. He retired from international cricket in April 2008 citing work and family commitments.

=== Statistics ===
In all matches for Ireland, Langford-Smith has scored 246 runs at an average of 15.38 with a top score of 39 against Somerset in May 2007, also his highest List A score. He has taken 48 wickets at an average of 28.35, with best innings bowling figures of 5/65 against Scotland in August 2006, also his best first-class bowling performance and the only time he has taken five wickets in an innings for Ireland. His highest first-class score with the bat is six not out, and his best List A bowling performance is 3/32. That List A bowling performance is his best ODI bowling performance, against Scotland.
