= William Porterfield =

Irish cricketer

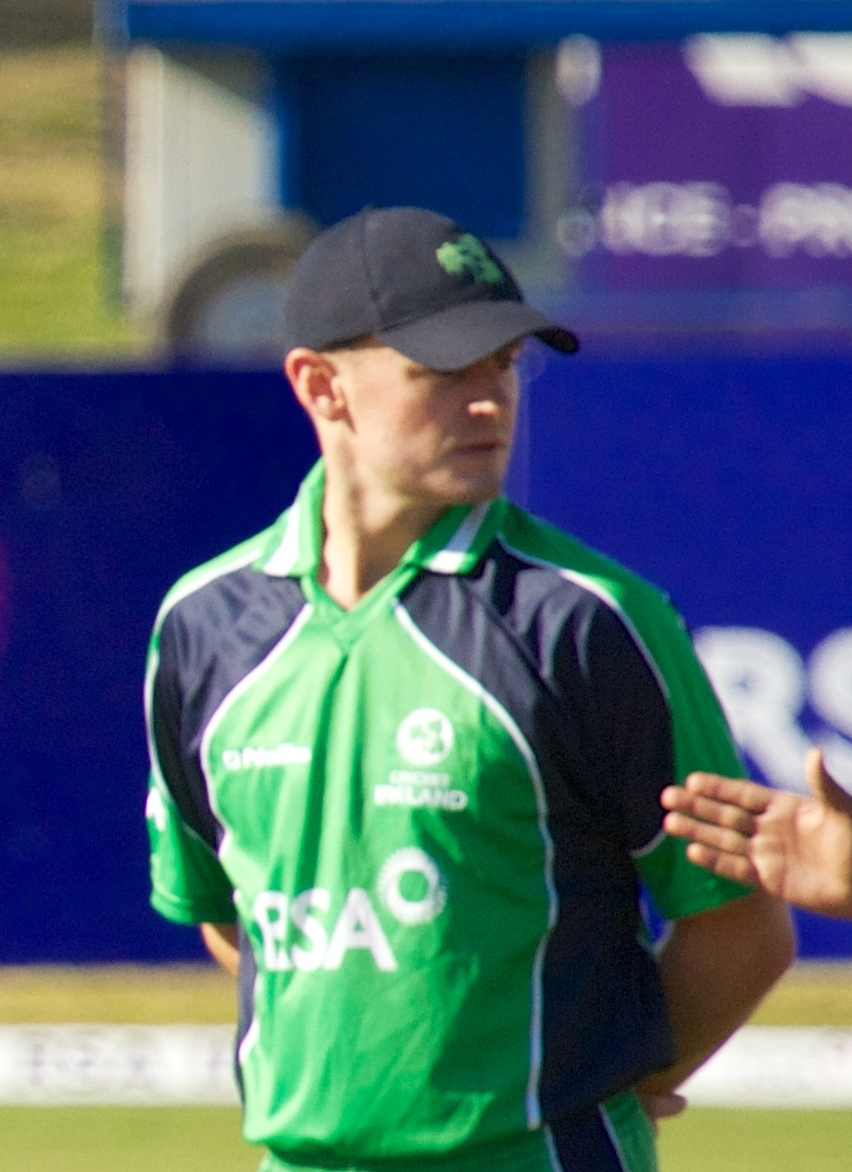
- Porterfield in 2013

Personal information
- Full name: William Thomas Stuart Porterfield
- Born: 6 September 1984 (age 42); Donemana, Northern Ireland
- Height: 5 ft 9 in (1.75 m)
- Batting: Left-handed
- Bowling: Right-arm off break
- Role: Opening batsman

International information
- National side: Ireland (2006–2022)
- Test debut (cap 1): 11 May 2018 v Pakistan
- Last Test: 24 July 2019 v England
- ODI debut (cap 14): 5 August 2006 v Scotland
- Last ODI: 16 January 2022 v West Indies
- ODI shirt no.: 6 (formerly 34)
- T20I debut (cap 8): 2 August 2008 v Scotland
- Last T20I: 22 August 2018 v Afghanistan
- T20I shirt no.: 6 (formerly 34)

Domestic team information
- Years: Team
- 2008–2010: Gloucestershire
- 2007: MCC
- 2011–2017: Warwickshire
- 2017–2022: North West Warriors

Career statistics
Competition	Test	ODI	FC	LA
Matches	3	148	136	294
Runs scored	58	4,343	6,867	8,958
Batting average	9.66	30.58	31.64	31.99
100s/50s	0/0	11/20	11/34	15/49
Top score	32	139	207	139
Balls bowled	–	–	108	–
Wickets	–	–	2	–
Bowling average	–	–	69.00	–
5 wickets in innings	–	–	0	–
10 wickets in match	–	–	0	–
Best bowling	–	–	1/29	–
Catches/stumpings	2/–	68/–	146/–	142/–
- Source: Cricinfo, 16 June 2022
- Porterfield's voice recorded April 2015

William Thomas Stuart Porterfield (born 6 September 1984) is an Irish former cricketer from Northern Ireland and a former captain of the Ireland cricket team. He played first-class cricket for Gloucestershire and Warwickshire. A left-handed batsman, he played for Ireland from 2006 to 2022, and has captained Ireland at all levels from Under-13 and is considered one of the greatest Irish cricketers of all time. During Afghanistan T20I series in March 2017, he passed 1,000 runs in T20Is and became the first player from Ireland to do so. In May 2018, he was named as the captain of Ireland's squad for their first ever Test match, against Pakistan. He announced his retirement from international cricket on 16 June 2022.

In December 2018, he was one of nineteen players to be awarded a central contract by Cricket Ireland for the 2019 season. In July 2019, Porterfield scored his 4,000th run in ODI cricket and recorded his 50th win as captain of Ireland's One Day International team. In January 2020, he was one of nineteen players to be awarded a central contract from Cricket Ireland, the first year in which all contracts were awarded on a full-time basis. Later the same month, in the second ODI against the West Indies, Porterfield played in his 300th international match for Ireland and announced his retirement from international cricket on 16 June 2022.

== International career ==
Porterfield made his first-class cricket debut on 17 May 2006, for Ireland against Namibia in the 2006–07 ICC Intercontinental Cup. On 31 January 2007, he scored his maiden ODI century with an unbeaten 112 to guide his side to victory over Bermuda. He followed it up in his next game with 104 not out against Kenya. In the 2007 World Cup he was man of the match with 85 against Bangladesh during a Super Eight game, which Ireland won.

Porterfield scored his maiden first-class century in late August 2007. In a match against Bermuda as part of the 2007–08 ICC Intercontinental Cup, Porterfield scored 166 runs from 326 balls.

In the 2011 Cricket World Cup, Porterfield reached a fifty against the Netherlands. He hit 68 off 93 balls and helped his team to victory over the Netherlands.

=== Captaincy ===
Porterfield was appointed Ireland captain at the start of the 2008 season, succeeding Trent Johnston. Porterfield said "I've learnt a lot from Trent – he brought young players through, looked after them and he set an example by how he went about his game and how he prepared on and off the field. I may be young but I've plenty of experience of captaincy and I love it, being out there right in the mixer. I was vice-captain under Trent and I filled in when he was off the field so I've had a taste of it".

Despite being Ireland's official captain, Porterfield chose to represent his county (Gloucestershire) instead of leading Ireland in their ODIs against Scotland and New Zealand in July 2008 in an attempt to secure a permanent position at Gloucestershire. He said "It's definitely the hardest decision I've ever had to make ... I feel it's the right decision for me at this stage in my career".

Porterfield was one of seven Ireland players to be nominated for the 2009 Associate and Affiliate Player of the Year (there were fourteen nominees in all); he eventually won the award. Speaking about the award, Portfield said "It's been a fantastic year for us. This award caps it off on a personal note but it's great for the team to be going to the World Cup having won the ICC Cricket World Cup Qualifier early this year. This award is great for Irish cricket and it shows how much we have done on the field. If we continue onwards and keep on making improvements in that department then other awards will follow."

A side made up of some of the best players from Associate and Affiliate teams was put together to face England in Dubai in January 2012. The three-day match was part of England's preparation for a series against Pakistan later that month. Porterfield captained the squad and was one of four Ireland players included.

=== 2011 World Cup ===
Porterfield was selected in Ireland's 15-man squad for the 2011 World Cup. He led them to a famous victory over England and to narrow defeats to Bangladesh, West Indies and India, as well as hitting the hundredth six of the tournament during the match against hosts India. He captained Ireland to a victory over the Netherlands.

=== Test cricket and beyond ===
In May 2018, Porterfield was named as the captain of a fourteen-man squad for Ireland's first ever Test match, which was played against Pakistan later the same month. He made his Test debut for Ireland, against Pakistan, on 11 May 2018.

In January 2019, he was named in Ireland's squad for their one-off Test against Afghanistan in India.

In July 2019, Porterfield played in his 250th match as captain of Ireland, in the first ODI match against Zimbabwe, at Bready Cricket Club Ground in Magheramason. In the third ODI of the series, Porterfield scored his 4,000th run in ODI cricket. Ireland went on to win the series 3–0, their first clean-sweep in ODIs against a Full Member side. With the victory in the third match, Porterfield recorded his 50th win as captain of Ireland in ODIs.

On 10 July 2020, Porterfield was named in Ireland's 21-man squad to travel to England to start training behind closed doors for the ODI series against the England cricket team.

== Domestic career ==
Between 2004 and 2006, Porterfield played Second XI cricket for Durham, MCC Young Cricketers, Northamptonshire, Derbyshire and Kent.

Porterfield attracted interest from Gloucestershire during the 2007 World Cup and was given a trial with the county in between international commitments. In the 2007 season, Porterfield became the first Irishman to score 1,000 runs in a calendar year, and towards the end of the season Gloucestershire offered him a two-year contract.

He guided Ireland to their first victory against a county side in two years against Warwickshire with an innings of 69 from 110 balls.

Porterfield was absent from Ireland's last two Friends Provident Trophy matches as he was called into the Gloucestershire squad, Kyle McCallan took over the role of captain. After Gloucestershire batsman Craig Spearman sustained an injury, Porterfield was given the opportunity to play for Gloucestershire opening the batting. He came close to scoring his maiden first-class century for Gloucestershire in a match against Glamorgan County Cricket Club in August 2008 but was out for 93. On 10 September, he and Kadeer Ali shared in Gloucestershire's highest opening partnership of the season; he scored 66.

In August 2010, he set a new career best in scoring 175 in the first innings of a County Championship Division Two match between Gloucestershire and Worcestershire at Cheltenham

At the end of the season, Porterfield was one of several players to leave Gloucestershire. In October 2010 he signed a three-year contract with Warwickshire, joining fellow Ireland international Boyd Rankin.
