= Andre Botha (cricketer) =

Irish cricketer

Personal information
- Full name: Andre Cornelius Botha
- Born: 12 September 1975 (age 51); Johannesburg, Transvaal, South Africa
- Batting: Left-handed
- Bowling: Right-arm medium
- Role: All-rounder

International information
- National side: Ireland
- ODI debut (cap 1): 13 June 2006 v England
- Last ODI: 11 March 2011 v West Indies
- T20I debut (cap 1): 2 August 2008 v Scotland
- Last T20I: 4 May 2010 v England

Domestic team information
- Years: Team
- 1998/99–1999/00: Griqualand West

Career statistics
Competition	ODI	T20I	FC	LA
Matches	42	14	30	91
Runs scored	666	130	1,762	1,300
Batting average	19.58	13.00	40.04	19.40
100s/50s	0/2	0/0	5/7	1/4
Top score	56	38	186	139
Balls bowled	1,560	204	2,649	3,230
Wickets	42	21	45	87
Bowling average	27.00	8.76	25.51	28.79
5 wickets in innings	0	0	0	0
10 wickets in match	0	0	0	0
Best bowling	4/19	3/14	4/52	4/19
Catches/stumpings	11/–	8/–	13/–	21/–
- Source: CricketArchive, 21 March 2011

Andre Cornelius Botha (born 12 September 1975) is a South African-born Irish former cricketer. He played 55 times in all for Ireland, including the 2005 ICC Trophy and the European Championship in 2004 and 2006. Botha retired in May 2011.

== Domestic career ==
A left-handed batsman and right-arm medium pace bowler, Botha played provincial cricket for Griqualand West in his native South Africa.

Botha was the resident professional at Clontarf Cricket Club from 1994 until his switch to North County in 2000. A prolific batsman at club level, Botha contributed to North County's Irish Senior Cup victories in 2001, 2003, 2005 and 2007 as well as garnering four consecutive Leinster Senior League winners' medals between 2003 and 2006.

== International career ==
Esteemed among the leading all-rounders in domestic cricket, the newly eligible Botha débuted for his adopted country in Ireland's August 2001 C&G Trophy victory over Wiltshire, although he started inauspiciously, registering nought with the bat and 1–50 with the ball.

A fixture in the Irish team thereafter, Botha's form temporarily deserted him during Ireland's momentous summer of 2005. Selected at #3 in the batting order throughout the group phase of the 2005 ICC Trophy, Botha recorded a dismal average of 9.5 for the tournament, twice succumbing on zero. However, his economical bowling contributed eight wickets to the Irish cause, and helped the team (which ultimately finished second in the competition) land a qualifying berth for the 2007 Cricket World Cup.

In marked contrast to his ICC Trophy form, the runs flowed freely from Botha's bat during Ireland's conquest of the 2005 ICC Intercontinental Cup. A tournament average of 66.00 encompassed an international career-best 97 against the Netherlands at Stormont, and knocks of 78 and 43* in the final victory over Kenya at Windhoek. Botha also accounted for eight wickets at 25.50 with his medium-paced bowling during the course of the tournament.

Selected for Ireland's inaugural One Day International against England at Stormont despite a series of low scores in the preceding C&G Trophy matches, Botha vindicated the selectors' judgement by top-scoring with 52 against a first-rate attack including Steve Harmison, Liam Plunkett and Sajid Mahmood. Since then, Botha has evinced a marked aptitude for One Day Internationals, averaging 39.66 in three ODIs to date, with a top score of 56 achieved against the Netherlands during Ireland's victorious 2006 European Cricket Championship campaign.

In August 2006, Botha was named in the 14-man squad which will represent Ireland at both the World Cricket League in Kenya and the Caribbean-hosted World Cup later the same year. He finished the provincial season with an insuperable batting average of 120.20 from ten innings.

Botha bowled well in the World Cricket League tournament, taking 13 wickets at an average of 21.30. Only one player took more wickets in the tournament.

In Ireland's second match in the 2007 World Cup, Botha achieved excellent bowling figures of 8–4–5–2, helping Ireland to a shock victory over Pakistan.

In January 2010 Cricket Ireland, the governing body for cricket in Ireland, awarded Botha a full-time contract. He was one of six players awarded such contracts with Cricket Ireland, and came just a year after the first professional contracts were awarded to Ireland's cricketers. Before that players were amateurs relying on income from other jobs and playing cricket in their spare time. The contract allowed Botha and the others to focus on cricket, with the aim of improving ahead of the 2011 World Cup.

Botha was selected in Ireland's 15-man squad for the 2011 World Cup. In May 2011, Botha announced his retirement from international cricket.

== Statistics ==
Botha is only the fourth Irish player to have achieved the double of 2000 runs and 100 wickets. Botha has also taken part in two of Ireland's record partnerships; 360 for the third wicket against UAE with Eoin Morgan in February 2007, and 234 for the sixth wicket against Scotland with Alex Cusack in August 2007. The 360 with Morgan is also Ireland's highest partnership for any wicket. Botha's 186 against Scotland in August 2007 was the highest individual score for Ireland in a home match.

Botha's extraordinary figures of 2/5 of eight overs in the 2007 ICC Cricket World Cup pool match against Pakistan deserve mention; while taking only two wickets, the figures equalled the record for the most economical eight over spell in the history of the World Cup.
