= Kyle McCallan =

Irish cricketer (born 1975)

Personal information
- Full name: William Kyle McCallan
- Born: 27 August 1975 (age 51); Carrickfergus, Northern Ireland
- Batting: Right-handed
- Bowling: Right-arm off spin

International information
- National side: Ireland
- ODI debut (cap 7): 13 June 2006 v England
- Last ODI: 27 August 2009 v England
- ODI shirt no.: 7
- T20I debut (cap 5): 2 August 2008 v Scotland
- Last T20I: 15 June 2009 v Pakistan
- T20I shirt no.: 7

Career statistics
Competition	ODI	T20I	FC	LA
Matches	39	9	25	99
Runs scored	361	11	552	1,299
Batting average	20.05	11.00	22.08	21.65
100s/50s	0/1	0/0	0/3	0/2
Top score	50*	9*	65	53*
Balls bowled	1,804	131	3,679	4,229
Wickets	39	8	55	81
Bowling average	30.97	19.00	29.41	35.91
5 wickets in innings	0	0	1	0
10 wickets in match	0	0	0	0
Best bowling	4/30	2/26	5/34	4/30
Catches/stumpings	4/–	3/–	17/–	16/–
- Source: CricketArchive, 29 August 2009

William Kyle McCallan MBE (born 27 August 1975), usually known as Kyle McCallan, is a former Irish cricketer from Northern Ireland. A right-handed batsman and off spin bowler, he has played more times for the Ireland cricket team than any other player, more than 40 caps ahead of the next player in the table, the retired Peter Gillespie. Only three players have captained Ireland more times than McCallan, and only Jason Molins has captained them to more wins. He has also played second XI cricket for Derbyshire and Surrey.

He announced his retirement from international cricket on 2 December 2009, after a record 226 caps. He scored 3616 runs at an average of 23.33 and he also took 256 wickets. He also captained Ireland a record 54 times.

His matches for Ireland include fifteen first-class matches, 61 List A matches and 19 One-Day Internationals, all of Ireland's ODIs to date. He represented Ireland at the 2007 Cricket World Cup, and the ICC Trophy in 2001 and 2005. He also represented Northern Ireland in the cricket tournament at the 1998 Commonwealth Games.

McCallan was awarded the MBE in the 2010 Birthday Honours for his services to cricket.

== Playing career ==
=== 1990s ===
McCallan made his debut for Ireland on 2 June 1996, playing against Wales in Dublin, taking a wicket with his first delivery. He scored his first century in his following match, against the MCC in Malahide. He made his List A debut later in the month, playing in the NatWest Trophy against Sussex. He was named in the Ireland squad for the 1996 Triple Crown Tournament in Wales, but only played one match, against the hosts. He was also named in Ireland's squad for the first European Championship that year, again playing just one game, against Gibraltar. The year finished for McCallan with a match against Scotland, which marked his first-class debut.

He was not named in Ireland's squad for the 1997 ICC Trophy, but did become a regular member of the team after the tournament. He played Benson & Hedges Cup matches against Middlesex and Somerset before a NatWest Trophy match against Yorkshire in 1997, before playing in the Triple Crown Tournament.

The year continued with a first-class match against Scotland, a match against Australia in which he scored 64 not out, a match against the Earl of Arundel's XI and a match against the MCC at Lord's, before a busy 1998 in which he played 22 times for Ireland.

The busy 1998 started for McCallan with Benson & Hedges Cup matches against Glamorgan, Essex and Middlesex, before matches against the MCC and Bangladesh and a NatWest Trophy game against Warwickshire. It continued with the Triple Crown Tournament, two matches against South Africa and the European Championship. Several matches against Australia A in August, one of which was first-class, served as preparation for the 1998 Commonwealth Games, where McCallan represented Northern Ireland, playing against South Africa, Barbados and Bangladesh.

The final year of the 20th century was a quiet one for Kyle McCallan's cricket career when compared to 1998. NatWest Trophy matches against Northumberland and the Essex Cricket Board were followed by six matches against the South Africa Cricket Academy and a match against the MCC.

=== 21st century ===
The first event in 2000 for McCallan was the ICC Emerging Nations Tournament in Zimbabwe, playing against Scotland, Kenya and Denmark in addition to the host's A team. The summer started with a NatWest Trophy match against Shropshire and two matches each against the MCC and Zimbabwe. He then captained Ireland in the 2000 European Championship which was followed by a first-class match against Scotland.

Three matches against the MCC and a match against the Earl of Arundel's XI in England served as warm-up for Ireland served as warm-ups for the 2001 ICC Trophy, which McCallan captained Ireland in. He was one of two Irish bowlers to take ten wickets in the tournament and was named man of the match against the Netherlands. Returning to Ireland, he played a match against Australia before the Triple Crown Tournament in England and a C & G Trophy match against the Hampshire Cricket Board.

A C & G Trophy match against Nottinghamshire started 2002 for McCallan, before a match against West Indies A in June. This was followed by the European Championship, a match against the MCC and a C & G Trophy match against Berkshire. Two matches against Zimbabwe were his first matches the following year, the first of which Ireland won by ten wickets. He played several more matches that year, including internationals against South Africa and Denmark.

In 2004, McCallan played two C & G Trophy matches against Surrey and Northamptonshire, before two matches against the West Indies, the second of which Ireland won by six wickets. He also played that year against the MCC, an ICC Intercontinental Cup match against the Netherlands and the European Championship before two matches against Bangladesh.

The main event in 2005 for Kyle McCallan was the ICC Trophy. Ireland finished second in the tournament, thus qualifying for the 2007 World Cup. After the ICC Trophy finished, McCallan represented Ireland in their 2005 ICC Intercontinental Cup matches against Scotland and the Netherlands. Ireland qualified for the semi-finals in Windhoek, where McCallan played in the semi-final against the UAE before playing a key role in the final against Kenya. He took 4/34 in the Kenyan second innings, and was named joint man of the match with Andrew White.

The following year, 2006, was a busy one for Irish cricket as they prepared to make their World Cup debut and McCallan was a key part of their side. In the early part of the year, he played in several C & G Trophy games against various English county sides and a 2006 ICC Intercontinental Cup match against Namibia before playing his first ODI against England, also Ireland's first ODI. The year continued with the European Championship and a further Intercontinental Cup match against Scotland in Aberdeen.

=== 2007 World Cup ===
Ireland's build up to their first Cricket World Cup appearance in March 2007 started with a trip to Kenya in January/February to play in Division One of the World Cricket League, playing ODIs against Bermuda, Canada, Kenya, the Netherlands and Scotland. This was followed by an Intercontinental Cup match against the UAE in Abu Dhabi, before Ireland travelled to the West Indies to play in the World Cup.

The World Cup itself started with a tied match against Zimbabwe, before Ireland beat Pakistan. Ireland qualified for the Super 8 stage of the tournament, during which they beat Bangladesh, and finished in eighth place in a sixteen team tournament they were outright outsiders for. McCallan was present in all of these matches, and has played in all of Ireland's ODI's to date.

Back home, McCallan continued to play for Ireland, playing several matches against English county sides in the Friends Provident Trophy. He played in the final of the Intercontinental Cup against Canada, which Ireland again won. He also played in Ireland's ODIs against South Africa and India.

=== Statistics ===
In all matches for Ireland as of 10 June 2007 McCallan scored 3020 runs at an average of 23.05, with two scores of exactly 100, against the MCC in his second match, and against Wales in July 1998. He has taken 185 wickets at an average of 30.66, with best innings bowling figures of 5/23 against Italy in July 2000. The other time he took five wickets in an innings was against Canada in the final of the 2006 Intercontinental Cup where he took 5/34. His run total is the fifth highest for Ireland and his wicket tally is the sixth highest.

In first-class cricket, his top score is 65, against Scotland, and his best innings bowling is 5/34, in the Intercontinental Cup final against Canada. In List A cricket, his top score is 53 not out against Bangladesh for Northern Ireland. His best List A innings bowling is 4/36 against Kenya, also his best ODI bowling. His top-score in ODIs is 50 not out against the Netherlands. He made his 225th appearance for Ireland in their 22 August 2009 ODI win over Scotland.
