= August 2010 in sports =

<<	August 2010					>>
Su	Mo	Tu	We	Th	Fr	Sa
1	2	3	4	5	6	7
8	9	10	11	12	13	14
15	16	17	18	19	20	21
22	23	24	25	26	27	28
29	30	31
Sports

This list shows notable sports-related deaths, events, and notable outcomes that occurred in August of 2010.

== Deaths in August ==
- 1: Eric Tindill
- 10: Antonio Pettigrew
- 16: Bobby Thomson
- 22: Stjepan Bobek
- 27: Anton Geesink
- 30: Francisco Varallo
- 31: Laurent Fignon

== Current sporting seasons ==
=== Australian rules football 2010 ===
- Australian Football League

=== Auto racing 2010 ===
- Formula One
- Sprint Cup
- IRL IndyCar Series
- World Rally Championship
- Formula Two
- Nationwide Series
- Camping World Truck Series
- GP2 Series
- GP3 Series
- WTTC
- V8 Supercar
- American Le Mans
- Le Mans Series
- Superleague Formula
- Rolex Sports Car Series
- FIA GT1 World Championship
- Formula Three
- Auto GP
- World Series by Renault
- Deutsche Tourenwagen Masters
- Super GT

=== Baseball 2010 ===
- Major League Baseball
- Nippon Professional Baseball

=== Basketball 2010 ===
- WNBA Playoffs
- Philippines collegiate:
  - NCAA
  - UAAP

=== Canadian football 2010 ===
- Canadian Football League

=== Cricket 2010 ===
- England:
  - County Championship
  - Clydesdale Bank 40
  - Friends Provident t20

=== Football (soccer) 2010 ===
National teams competitions

- UEFA Euro 2012 qualifying
- 2011 FIFA Women's World Cup qualification (UEFA)
- 2011 UEFA European Under-21 Championship qualification

International clubs competitions

- UEFA (Europe) Champions League
- Europa League
- UEFA Women's Champions League
- Copa Sudamericana
- AFC (Asia) Champions League
- AFC Cup
- CAF (Africa) Champions League
- CAF Confederation Cup
- CONCACAF (North & Central America) Champions League

Domestic (national) competitions

- Argentina
- Australia
- Brazil
- England
- France
- Germany
- Iran
- Italy
- Japan
- Norway
- Russia
- Scotland
- Spain
- Major League Soccer (USA & Canada)
- Women's Professional Soccer (USA)

=== Golf 2010 ===
- PGA Tour
- European Tour
- LPGA Tour
- Champions Tour

=== Lacrosse 2010 ===
- Major League Lacrosse

=== Motorcycle racing 2010 ===
- Moto GP
- Superbike World Championship
- Supersport racing

=== Rugby league 2010 ===
- Super League
- NRL

=== Rugby union 2010 ===
- 2011 Rugby World Cup qualifying
- Top 14
- Currie Cup
- ITM Cup

=== Snooker ===
- Players Tour Championship

== August 31, 2010 (Tuesday) ==
=== Water polo ===
- Women's European Championship in Zagreb, Croatia:
  - Group A:
    - Croatia 3–28 Mexico
    - Greece 7–5 Italy
  - Group B:
    - Spain 12–10 Germany
    - Netherlands 8–9 Hungary

=== Badminton ===
- BWF World Championships in France.

== August 30, 2010 (Monday) ==
=== Tennis ===
- Grand Slams US Open in New York City, United States starts.

=== Water polo ===
- Men's European Championship in Zagreb, Croatia:
  - Group A:
    - Spain 10–11 Romania
    - Italy 11–10 Montenegro
    - Croatia 16–3 Turkey
      - Standings (after 2 games): Romania, Italy 6 points, Croatia, Montenegro 3, Spain, Turkey 0.
  - Group B:
    - Germany 7–6 Russia
    - Serbia 6–9 Hungary
    - Greece 10–5 North Macedonia
      - Standings (after 2 games): Hungary 6 points, Serbia, Germany, Greece, Macedonia 3, Russia 0.

=== Cricket ===
- Pakistan in England 4th Test in London, day 4 England win by an innings and 225 runs; win 4-match series 3–1.

== August 29, 2010 (Sunday) ==
- EuroBasket 2011 qualification conclusion.

=== Field hockey ===
- Women's World Cup in Rosario, Argentina starts.

=== Auto racing ===
- Formula One Belgian Grand Prix in Spa, Belgium: (1) Lewis Hamilton (GBR) (McLaren-Mercedes)
- Nationwide Series NAPA Auto Parts 200 in Montreal, Canada: (1) Boris Said (Ford

=== Motorcycle racing ===
- Moto GP:
  - Indianapolis motorcycle Grand Prix in Speedway, Indiana, United States:
    - MotoGP: (1) Dani Pedrosa (ESP) (Honda)
    - Moto2: (1) Toni Elías (ESP) (Moriwaki)
    - 125cc: (1) Nicolás Terol (ESP) (Aprilia)

=== Volleyball ===
- FIVB World Grand Prix Final Round in Ningbo, China concludes. The United States win the title for the third time.

=== Water polo ===
- Men's European Championship in Zagreb, Croatia:
  - Group A:
    - Turkey 6–12 Romania
    - Italy 7–6 Spain
    - Montenegro 11–9 Croatia
  - Group B:
    - Russia 9–10 North Macedonia
    - Hungary 10–8 Germany
    - Serbia 13–5 Greece

=== Golf ===
- PGA Tour:
  - FedEx Cup Playoffs:
    - The Barclays in Paramus, New Jersey:
      - Winner: Matt Kuchar (USA) 272 (-12)^{PO}
        - Kuchar wins his third PGA Tour title.
- European Tour:
  - Johnnie Walker Championship at Gleneagles in Auchterarder, Scotland:
    - Winner: Edoardo Molinari (ITA) 278 (-10)
      - Molinari wins his second European Tour title, and is later announced as one of three wildcard picks for the European team for October's Ryder Cup along with Luke Donald (ENG) and Pádraig Harrington (IRL).
- LPGA Tour:
  - CN Canadian Women's Open in Winnipeg:
    - Winner: Michelle Wie (USA) 276 (-12)
      - Wie wins her second LPGA Tour title.
- Champions Tour:
  - Boeing Classic in Snoqualmie, Washington:
    - Winner: Bernhard Langer (GER) 198 (-18)
      - Langer wins his fifth Champions Tour title of the season and thirteenth overall.
- Amateur events:
  - U.S. Amateur Championship in University Place, Washington:
    - Final: Peter Uihlein (USA) def. David Chung (USA) 4 & 2
      - Uihlein wins his third major amateur title, as both players earn a place at the 2011 Masters Tournament.

=== Snooker ===
- Players Tour Championship:
  - Euro Event 1 in Fürth, Germany. Judd Trump wins his third professional title.

== August 28, 2010 (Saturday) ==
=== Basketball ===
- FIBA World Championship in Turkey begins.

=== Cycling ===
- Grand Tours:
  - Vuelta a España Starts.

=== Tennis ===
- ATP World Tour Pilot Pen Tennis Sergiy Stakhovsky won the fourth title of his career.
- WTA Tour Pilot Pen Tennis Caroline Wozniacki won the title for the third consecutive time, her fourth of the year and tenth of her career.

=== Auto racing ===
- IndyCar Series Peak Antifreeze & Motor Oil Indy 300 in Joliet, Illinois: (1) Dario Franchitti (GBR) (Chip Ganassi Racing)

=== Mixed martial arts ===
- UFC 118 in Boston, Massachusetts

=== Equestrianism ===
- Show jumping:
  - Global Champions Tour 9th Competition in Rio de Janeiro (CSI 5*). Marcus Ehning (GER) on Noltes Küchengirl wins the title for the first time.

=== Figure skating ===
- ISU Junior Grand Prix in Courchevel, France.

=== Cricket ===
- Tri-nation series in Sri Lanka, Final in Dambulla concludes. Sri Lanka win by 74 runs.

== August 27, 2010 (Friday) ==
=== Football (soccer) ===
- UEFA Super Cup in Monaco Atlético Madrid Atlético won the title for the first time.

=== Athletics ===
- IAAF Diamond League: Memorial Van Damme in Brussels, Belgium

== August 26, 2010 (Thursday) ==
- Summer Youth Olympics in Singapore Closes

== August 25, 2010 (Wednesday) ==
=== Cricket ===
- Tri-nation series in Sri Lanka: (teams in **bold** advance to the final)
  - **India** 223 (46.3 overs; Virender Sehwag 110); New Zealand 118 (30.1 overs) in Dambulla. **India win by 105 runs.**
    - Final standings: **Sri Lanka** 11 points, India 10, New Zealand 7.

== August 24, 2010 (Tuesday) ==
=== Cycling ===
- UCI ProTour:
  - Eneco Tour of Benelux concludes.
    - Final general classification: (1) Martin 28h 50' 57" (2) Koos Moerenhout (NED) (Rabobank) + 31" (3) Edvald Boasson Hagen (NOR) (Team Sky) + 1' 46"

=== Cricket ===
- Tri-nation series in Sri Lanka: (team in **bold** advances to the final)
  - India 103 (33.4 overs; Thissara Perera 5/28); **Sri Lanka** 104/2 (15.1 overs) in Dambulla. **Sri Lanka win by 8 wickets.**
    - Standings: Sri Lanka 11 points (4 matches), New Zealand 7 (3), India 5 (3).

== August 23, 2010 (Monday) ==
=== Cricket ===
- Pakistan in England 3rd Test in London, day 4 **Pakistan win by 4 wickets; England lead 4-match series 2–1.**

== August 22, 2010 (Sunday) ==
=== Basketball ===
- FIBA Europe Under-16 Championship for Women in Greece concludes.

Russia won the title for the fourth time.

=== Tennis ===
- ATP World Tour Western & Southern Financial Group Masters Roger Federer won his second title of the year, 17th Masters 1000 title and 63rd title of his career. He wins this event for the fourth time, also winning in 2005, 2007, and 2009.

=== Auto racing ===
- IndyCar Series Indy Grand Prix of Sonoma in Sonoma, California: (1) Will Power (AUS) (Team Penske)
- World Rally Championship Rallye Deutschland in Trier: (1) Sébastien Loeb (FRA) / Daniel Elena (MON) (Citroën C4 WRC)

=== Water polo ===
- FINA Women's World Cup in Christchurch, New Zealand The United States win the Cup for the second time.

=== Canoeing ===
- Sprint World Championships in Poznan, Poland.

=== Swimming ===
- Pan Pacific Championships in Irvine, California concludes.

=== Athletics ===
- David Rudisha (KEN) breaks the men's 800 metres world record in a time of one minute 41.09 seconds at the ISTAF meeting in Berlin. He improves the previous record of Kenyan-born Wilson Kipketer (DEN) by 0.02 seconds.

=== Golf ===
- Senior majors:
  - JELD-WEN Tradition in Sunriver, Oregon, United States : (1) Fred Funk 276 (-12)
    - Funk wins his second Tradition and third senior major.
- PGA Tour:
  - Wyndham Championship in Greensboro, North Carolina:
    - Winner: Arjun Atwal (IND) 260 (-20)
      - Atwal becomes the first Indian-born player to win a PGA Tour event, and the first Monday qualifier to win on the tour since 1986.
- European Tour:
  - Czech Open in Celadná, Czech Republic:
    - Winner: Peter Hanson (SWE) 278 (-10)^{PO}
      - Hanson wins a three-way playoff for his second European Tour title of the season and fourth of his career.
- LPGA Tour:
  - Safeway Classic in North Plains, Oregon:
    - Winner: Ai Miyazato (JPN) 205 (-11)
      - Miyazato wins her fifth LPGA event of the year and sixth of her career, and for the third time this year claims the Number 1 spot in the Women's World Golf Rankings.

== August 21, 2010 (Saturday) ==
=== Auto racing ===
- NASCAR Sprint Cup Series Irwin Tools Night Race in Bristol, Tennessee: (1) (Nevada) Kyle Busch (Toyota; Joe Gibbs Racing)
    - Busch completes a clean sweep of all three national series races (Sprint Cup, Nationwide and Camping World Trucks) in the same weekend, the first driver to do so.

=== Rugby union ===
- Tri Nations Series:
  - South Africa 22–29 New Zealand in Soweto
    - The All Blacks score two tries in the last 3 minutes to secure the series crown, their tenth overall.

== August 20, 2010 (Friday) ==
=== Auto racing ===
- Nationwide Series Food City 250 in Bristol, Tennessee: (1) (Nevada) Kyle Busch (Toyota; Joe Gibbs Racing)

== August 19, 2010 (Thursday) ==
=== Baseball ===
- U.S. federal authorities indict retired seven-time Cy Young Award winner Roger Clemens on charges of making false statements to Congress about his alleged use of performance-enhancing drugs. (The New York Times)

=== Athletics ===
- IAAF Diamond League: Weltklasse Zürich in Zürich, Switzerland.

== August 18, 2010 (Wednesday) ==
- Pan Pacific Championships in Irvine, California starts.

=== Cricket ===
- Netherlands in Ireland 2nd ODI in Dublin. **Ireland win by 9 wickets; win 2-match series 2–0.**

== August 17, 2010 (Tuesday) ==
=== Cycling ===
- UCI ProTour Eneco Tour of Benelux Starts.

=== Cricket ===
- Afghanistan in Scotland 2nd ODI in Ayr. **Scotland win by 6 wickets; 2-match series drawn 1–1.**

== August 16, 2010 (Monday) ==
=== Cycling ===
- UCI ProTour
  - Vattenfall Cyclassics in Hamburg, Germany: (gold) Tyler Farrar (USA) (Garmin–Transitions) 5h 02' 36" (silver) Edvald Boasson Hagen (NOR) (Team Sky) s.t. (bronze) André Greipel (GER) (Team HTC–Columbia) s.t.

=== Snooker ===
- Players Tour Championship:
  - Event 4 in Sheffield Barry Pinches wins the second professional title of his career.

=== Cricket ===
- Afghanistan in Scotland 1st ODI in Ayr. **Afghanistan win by 9 wickets; lead 2-match series 1–0.**
- Netherlands in Ireland 1st ODI in Dublin. **Ireland win by 70 runs; lead 2-match series 1–0.**

== August 15, 2010 (Sunday) ==
=== Basketball ===
- FIBA Asia Stanković Cup concludes: Lebanon win the Cup for the first time.
- FIBA Europe Under-16 Championship in Bar, Montenegro concludes: Croatia win the title for the second time.

=== Tennis ===
- ATP World Tour Rogers Masters in Toronto, Canada Andy Murray defends his title, and wins the 15th title of his career.
- WTA Tour Western & Southern Financial Group Women's Open in Mason, Ohio, United States Kim Clijsters won the 38th title of her career.

=== Auto racing ===
- NASCAR Sprint Cup Series:
  - Carfax 400 in Brooklyn, Michigan: (1) Kevin Harvick (Chevrolet; Richard Childress Racing)

=== Motorcycle racing ===
- Moto GP:
  - Czech Republic motorcycle Grand Prix in Brno, Czech Republic:
    - MotoGP: (1) Jorge Lorenzo (ESP) (Yamaha)
    - Moto2: (1) Toni Elías (ESP) (Moriwaki)
    - 125cc: (1) Nicolás Terol (ESP) (Aprilia)

=== Horse racing ===
- Canadian Triple Crown Breeders' Stakes in Toronto: (1) Miami Deco (trainer: Brian Lynch, jockey: Richard Dos Ramos)

=== Swimming ===
- European Aquatics Championships in Budapest, Hungary Concludes.

=== Golf ===
- Men's majors:
  - PGA Championship in Haven, Wisconsin, United States won by Martin Kaymer (GER)
    - Kaymer becomes the second German winner of a major championship, after Bernhard Langer.
    - Dustin Johnson misses out on the playoff when he is ruled to have grounded his club in a bunker on the final hole, incurring a two-stroke penalty.

== August 14, 2010 (Saturday) ==
=== Basketball ===
- FIBA South American Championship for Women in Santiago, Chile concludes: Brazil win the title for the tenth successive time, and 23rd time overall.

=== Auto racing ===
- Nationwide Series:
  - CARFAX 250 in Brooklyn, Michigan: (1) Brad Keselowski (Dodge; Penske Racing)

=== Equestrianism ===
- Show jumping:
  - Global Champions Tour 8th Competition in Valkenswaard (CSI 5*) won by Laura Kraut (USA) on Cedric

=== Athletics ===
- IAAF Diamond League: London Grand Prix in London, United Kingdom.

== August 12, 2010 (Thursday) ==
=== Basketball ===
- FIBA Europe Under-16 Championship for Women in Greece begins.

=== Handball ===
- World Youth Women's Handball Championship in the Dominican Republic Sweden win the title for the first time.
- Summer Youth Olympics in Singapore Opens

== August 10, 2010 (Tuesday) ==
=== Football (soccer) ===
- Friendly international matches:
  - Italy 0–1 Ivory Coast
  - United States 0–2 Brazil

=== Shooting ===
- ISSF World Championships in Munich, Germany concludes.

=== Cricket ===
- Tri-nation series in Sri Lanka starts.

== August 9, 2010 (Monday) ==
=== Cricket ===
- Pakistan in England 2nd Test in Birmingham, day 4. **England win by 9 wickets; lead 4-match series 2–0.**

== August 8, 2010 (Sunday) ==
=== Basketball ===
- FIBA Europe Under-18 Championship for Women in Slovakia concludes: Italy win the title for the second time, repeating their 1994 final victory over Spain.

=== Field hockey ===
- Men's Hockey Champions Trophy in Mönchengladbach, Germany concludes. Australia won the title for the third successive year, and eleventh time overall.

=== Tennis ===
- ATP World Tour Legg Mason Tennis Classic in Washington, D.C., United States David Nalbandian Nalbandian won his first title of the year and eleventh of his career.
- WTA Tour Mercury Insurance Open in San Diego, United States Svetlana Kuznetsova Kuznetsova won the thirteenth title of her career.
- WTA Tour e-Boks Danish Open in Farum Caroline Wozniacki Wozniacki won the inaugural event and the eighth title of her career.

=== Auto racing ===
- NASCAR Sprint Cup Series Heluva Good! Sour Cream Dips at the Glen in Watkins Glen, New York: (1) (Colombia) Juan Pablo Montoya (Chevrolet; Earnhardt Ganassi Racing)
- IndyCar Series Honda Indy 200 in Lexington, Ohio: (1) Dario Franchitti (GBR) (Chip Ganassi Racing)

=== Equestrianism ===
- Show jumping:
  - FEI World Cup Jumping – Central European League, South Sub-League won by Tim Hoster (GER) on Rastellie
  - Grand Prix of Ireland in Dublin (CSIO 5*) won by McLain Ward (USA) on Antares F

=== Golf ===
- World Golf Championships:
  - WGC-Bridgestone Invitational in Akron, Ohio, United States:
    - Winner: Hunter Mahan (USA) 268 (-12)
      - Mahan wins his third PGA Tour title, and barring injury, seals a place in the American team for the Ryder Cup in October.
- PGA Tour:
  - Turning Stone Resort Championship in Verona, New York:
    - Winner: Bill Lunde (USA) 271 (-17)
      - Lunde wins his first PGA Tour title.
- Champions Tour:
  - 3M Championship in Blaine, Minnesota:
    - Winner: David Frost (RSA) 191 (-25)
      - Frost wins his first Champions Tour title.

=== Snooker ===
- Players Tour Championship:
  - Event 3 in Sheffield:
    - Final: **Tom Ford** (ENG) def. Jack Lisowski (ENG) 4–0
      - Ford wins his first professional title.
      - Order of Merit (after 3 of 12 events): (1) Mark Selby (ENG) 13,100 (2) Ford 12,100 (3) Mark Williams (WAL) 10,200

== August 7, 2010 (Saturday) ==
=== Cycling ===
- UCI ProTour:
  - Tour de Pologne concludes
    - Final general classification: (1) Dan Martin (IRL) (Garmin–Transitions) 30h 38' 48" (2) Grega Bole (SLO) (Lampre–Farnese) + 8" (3) Bauke Mollema (NED) (Rabobank) + 10"

=== Auto racing ===
- Nationwide Series:
  - Zippo 200 at the Glen in Watkins Glen, New York: (1) (Australia) Marcos Ambrose (Toyota; JTG Daugherty Racing) (2) (Connecticut) Joey Logano (Toyota; Joe Gibbs Racing) (3) (California) Kevin Harvick (Chevrolet; Kevin Harvick Inc.)
    - Drivers' championship standings (after 22 of 35 races): (1) (Michigan) Brad Keselowski (Dodge; Penske Racing) 3509 points (2) (Missouri) Carl Edwards (Ford; Roush Fenway Racing) 3182 (3) (Nevada) Kyle Busch (Toyota; Joe Gibbs Racing) 3036

=== Volleyball ===
- Asian Men's Cup Championship in Urmia, Iran Iran win the title for the second time.

=== Mixed martial arts ===
- UFC 117 in Oakland, California:

=== Equestrianism ===
- Show jumping:
  - Puissance in Dublin (CSIO 5*) won by Pablo Barrios (VEN) on Sinatra

=== Cricket ===
- India in Sri Lanka 3rd Test in Colombo, day 5. **India win by 5 wickets; 3-match series drawn 1–1.**

== August 6, 2010 (Friday) ==
=== Equestrianism ===
- Show jumping:
  - Meydan FEI Nations Cup 8th competition: FEI Nations Cup of Ireland in Dublin (CSIO 5*) won by (Eric van der Vleuten on Utascha SFN

=== Athletics ===
- IAAF Diamond League: DN Galan in Stockholm, Sweden.

== August 4, 2010 (Wednesday) ==
- European Aquatics Championships in Budapest, Hungary Starts.

== August 3, 2010 (Tuesday) ==
=== Cricket ===
- India's Sachin Tendulkar becomes the most capped player in Test cricket, receiving his 169th cap to surpass Steve Waugh.

== August 2, 2010 (Monday) ==
=== Basketball ===
- EuroBasket 2011 qualification starts.

== August 1, 2010 (Sunday) ==
=== Cycling ===
- UCI ProTour Tour de Pologne starts.

=== Tennis ===
- ATP World Tour Allianz Suisse Open Gstaad in Gstaad, Switzerland Nicolás Almagro Almagro won the seventh title of his career.
- ATP World Tour ATP Studena Croatia Open Umag in Umag, Croatia Juan Carlos Ferrero won the 15th title of his career.
- ATP World Tour Farmers Classic in Los Angeles, California, United States Sam Querrey Querrey defends his title, and wins the sixth title of his career.
- Doubles: **Bob and Mike Bryan** (USA) win their 62nd career ATP Tour title, breaking the record previously set by The Woodies (Australians Todd Woodbridge and Mark Woodforde).
- WTA Tour Istanbul Cup in Istanbul, Turkey Anastasia Pavlyuchenkova wins the second title of her career.
- WTA Tour Bank of the West Classic in Stanford, California, United States Victoria Azarenka wins the fourth title of her career.

=== Auto racing ===
- Formula One Hungarian Grand Prix in Mogyoród, Hungary: (1) Mark Webber (AUS) (Red Bull-Renault)
- NASCAR Sprint Cup Series Sunoco Red Cross Pennsylvania 500 in Long Pond, Pennsylvania: (1) Greg Biffle (Ford; Roush Fenway Racing)
- World Touring Car Championship:
  - Race of the Czech Republic:
    - Round 13: (1) Robert Huff (GBR) (Chevrolet; Chevrolet Cruze)
    - Round 14: (1) Andy Priaulx (GBR) (BMW Team RBM; BMW 320si)

=== Motorcycle racing ===
- Superbike:
  - Silverstone Superbike World Championship round in Northamptonshire, United Kingdom:
    - Race 1: (1) Cal Crutchlow (GBR) (Yamaha YZF-R1)
    - Race 2: (1) Crutchlow
- Supersport:
  - Silverstone Supersport World Championship round in Northamptonshire, United Kingdom: (1) Eugene Laverty (IRL) (Honda CBR600RR)

=== Baseball ===
- European Championship in Germany:
  - Final Italy win the title for the ninth time and stop the Netherlands' winning streak at five.

=== Equestrianism ===
- Dressage:
  - World Dressage Masters:
    - 3rd Competition: CDI 5*Royal International Horse Show at Hickstead:
      - B-Final (Grand Prix Spécial): won by Carl Hester (GBR) on Liebling II
      - A-Final (Grand Prix Freestyle): (gold) Adelinde Cornelissen (NED) on Parzival
- Show jumping:
  - King Georges V Gold Cup at Hickstead (CSIO 5*): (gold) Tim Stockdale (GBR) on Kalico Bay

=== Water polo ===
- FINA Men's World Cup in Oradea, Romania Serbia win the title for the first time as a separate nation, and their fourth title overall.

=== Athletics ===
- European Championships in Barcelona, Spain.

=== Golf ===
- Women's majors:
  - Ricoh Women's British Open in Southport, England:
    - (1) Yani Tseng (TWN)
      - Tseng wins her second major title of the year, third of her career, and fourth career LPGA Tour title.
- Senior majors:
  - U.S. Senior Open in Sammamish, Washington, United States: (USA unless stated)
    - (1) Bernhard Langer (GER)
      - Langer wins his second senior major in as many weeks, and twelfth career Champions Tour title.
- PGA Tour:
  - Greenbrier Classic in White Sulphur Springs, West Virginia:
    - Winner: Stuart Appleby (AUS)
      - Appleby wins his ninth PGA Tour title, as he shoots a final round 59; the fifth such round in Tour history and second this season.
- European Tour:
  - Irish Open in Killarney, Ireland:
    - Winner: Ross Fisher (ENG)
      - Fisher wins his fourth European Tour title.

=== Extreme sport ===
- X Games XVI in Los Angeles, California.
