= 2009–10 ICC Intercontinental Cup =

- Dates: 2 July 2009 – 6 December 2010
- Administrator(s): International Cricket Council
- Cricket format: First-Class cricket
- Tournament format(s): Round-robin and Final
- Champions: Afghanistan (1st title)
- Runners-up: Scotland
- Participants: 7
- Matches: 22
- Most runs: (Afghanistan) Mohammad Shahzad (802)
- Most wickets: (Afghanistan) Hameed Hasan (43)

The 2009–10 ICC Intercontinental Cup was the fifth edition of the ICC Intercontinental Cup tournament, an international first-class cricket competition between nations who had not been awarded Test status by the International Cricket Council. The first fixtures were played in July 2009. The format was changed since the previous edition, with a two division system being introduced. The 2009 ICC World Cup Qualifier also served as a qualifier for this tournament. The top six teams from the qualifier, along with a Zimbabwe XI, would compete in a round robin top division. The teams ranked 7th–10th in the competition would contest the ICC Intercontinental Shield.

== Table ==
Team	Points	P	W	L	D	FI	A
Afghanistan	97	6	5	0	1	4	0
Scotland	89	6	4	1	1	5	0
Zimbabwe XI	72	6	3	1	2	4	0
Ireland	55	6	2	1	3	3	0
Kenya	43	6	2	3	1	2	0
Netherlands	15	6	0	5	1	2	0
Canada	9	6	0	5	1	1	0

- Win – 14 points
- Draw if more than 10 hours of play lost – 7 points (otherwise 3 points)
- First Innings leader – 6 points (independent of final result)
- Abandoned without a ball played – 10 points.

== Matches ==
=== 2009 season ===
2–4 July
Scorecard

Scotland	v	Canada
185 (62.4 overs); Gordon Drummond 52 (97); Khurram Chohan 6/23 (13.4 overs)		142 (40.1 overs); Rizwan Cheema 35 (40); Calum MacLeod 4/66 (19.1 overs)
199 (75.2overs); Jan Stander 64 (128); Rizwan Cheema 3/39 (13 overs)		213 (78.3 overs); Sandeep Jyoti 47 (130); Richie Berrington 2/20 (7 overs)

Scotland won by 29 runs
Mannofield Park, Aberdeen, Scotland
Umpires: Enamul Haque (BAN) & Brian Jerling (SA)

- Points: Scotland 20, Canada 0

3–6 July
Scorecard

Ireland	v	Kenya
404 (111.3 overs); Paul Stirling 100 (181); Steve Tikolo 6/80 (24.3 overs)		331 (114 overs); Jimmy Kamande 73 (116); Regan West 4/94 (38 overs)
224/7 (dec.) (65 overs); Andrew White 59* (79); Jimmy Kamande 2/18 (5 overs)		245/8 (70 overs); Collins Obuya 84 (95); Andrew White 2/6 (5 overs)

Match Drawn
Woodvale Road, Eglinton, Ireland
Umpires: Paul Baldwin (GER) & Rudi Koertzen (SA)

- Points: Ireland 9, Kenya 3

15–18 July
Scorecard

Canada	v	Netherlands
177 (65.4 overs); Sandeep Jyoti 37 (70); Daan van Bunge 3/11 (4.4 overs)		229 (81.3 overs); Nick Statham 57 (137); Sandeep Jyoti 3/59 (14 overs)
419/9 (dec.) (100 overs); Sunil Dhaniram 144 (178); Berend Westdijk 4/85 (17 overs)		233/8 (103 overs); Daan van Bunge 98 (294); Umar Bhatti 4/32 (18 overs)

Match Drawn
Hazelaarweg, Rotterdam, Netherlands
Umpires: Niels Bagh (DEN) & Brian Jerling (SA)

- Points: Netherlands 9, Canada 3

14–17 August
Scorecard

Kenya	v	Canada
317 (86.1 overs); Steve Tikolo 158; Henry Osinde 3/28 (12.1 overs)		234 (92.4 overs); Zameer Zahir 57; Nehemiah Odhiambo 3/60 (20 overs)
362/3d (85 overs); Steve Tikolo 169; Umar Bhatti 3/62 (15 overs)		198 (65.3 overs); Abdool Samad 87 (152); Hiren Varaiya 6/45 (20.3 overs)

Kenya won by 247 runs
Maple Leaf Cricket Club, King City, Ontario, Canada
Umpires: Karran Bayney (CAN) & Norman Malcolm (WI)
Player of the match: Steve Tikolo (KEN)

- Points: Kenya 20, Canada 0

16–19 August
Scorecard

Zimbabwe XI	v	Afghanistan
350 (81.5 overs); Tatenda Taibu 172 (211); Mohammad Nabi 3/90 (28.5 overs)		427 (130.1 overs); Noor Ali 130 (200); Timycen Maruma 5/106 (36 overs)
446/9 (dec.) (113.5 overs); Tatenda Taibu 120 (195); Shapoor Zadran 2/42 (10 overs)		211/4 (44.5 overs); Noor Ali 100* (134); Forster Mutizwa 2/18 (3.5 overs)

Match Drawn
Mutare Sports Club, Mutare, Zimbabwe
Umpires: Jeff Luck (NAM) & Justice Tapfumaneyi (ZIM)

- Points: Afghanistan 9, Zimbabwe 3

17–20 August
Scorecard

Ireland	v	Scotland
202 (66.1 overs); William Porterfield 77 (121); Majid Haq 5/30 (19.1 overs)		208 (82.4 overs); Qasim Sheikh 100* (215); Regan West 7/88 (29.4 overs)
303 (106.1 overs); William Porterfield 118 (304); Gordon Goudie 4/61 (19.1 overs)		72/5 (31.0 overs); Qasim Sheikh 17 (43); Andre Botha 2/16 (6 overs)

Match Drawn
Mannofield Park, Aberdeen, Scotland
Umpires: Paul Baldwin (GER) & Ian Ramage

- Points: Scotland 9, Ireland 3

24–27 August
Scorecard

Netherlands	v	Afghanistan
181 (56.5 overs); Tom de Grooth 54 (86); Hamid Hassan 4/45 (17.5 overs)		107 (36.5 overs); Nowroz Mangal 41 (102); Peter Borren 3/21 (9 overs)
132 (38.1 overs); Peter Borren 63 (70); Mirwais Ashraf 4/24 (9.1 overs)		209/9 (89.3 overs); Noor Ali 56 (127); Edgar Schiferli 5/57 (24 overs)

Afghanistan won by 1 wicket
VRA Cricket Ground, Amstelveen, Netherlands
Umpires: Niels Bagh (DEN) & Nadeem Ghauri (PAK)

- Points: Netherlands 6, Afghanistan 14

=== 2009–10 season ===
7–10 October
Scorecard

Kenya	v	Zimbabwe XI
333 (92.3 overs); Steve Tikolo 61 (96); Timycen Maruma 3/82 (24 overs)		352 (103.5 overs); Vusi Sibanda 209 (320); Thomas Odoyo 3/38 (19 overs)
254 (74.3 overs); Morris Ouma 54 (115); Ed Rainsford 3/39 (13 overs)		238/5 (62.5 overs); Vusi Sibanda 116* (172); Thomas Odoyo 1/18 (6 overs)

Zimbabwe XI won by 5 wickets
Kwekwe Sports Club, Kwekwe, Zimbabwe
Umpires: Owen Chorimbe (ZIM) & Nadir Shah (BAN)

- Points: Zimbabwe XI 20, Kenya 0

21–24 January
Scorecard

Ireland	v	Afghanistan
405 (98 overs); William Porterfield 78 (134); Samiullah Shenwari 4/75 (27 overs)		474 (153.2 overs); Mohammad Shahzad 88 (121); Andrew White 4/99 (31.2 overs)
202 (75.3 overs); Trent Johnston 63* (91); Dawlat Ahmadzai 5/52 (15 overs)		137/3 (31.3 overs); Noor Ali 57 (75); Trent Johnston 1/13 (4 overs)

Afghanistan won by 7 wickets
Rangiri Dambulla International Stadium, Dambulla, Sri Lanka
Umpires: Ranmore Martinesz & Tyron Wijewardene

- Points: Afghanistan 20, Ireland 0

25–28 January
Scorecard

Kenya	v	Scotland
91 (49.1 overs); Collins Obuya 40 (73); Richie Berrington 3/13 (14 overs)		306 (116.1 overs); Qasim Sheikh 108 (222); Nehemiah Odhiambo 3/60 (19 overs)
323(132.4 overs); Morris Ouma 130 (209); Majid Haq 3/46 (29 overs)		110/2 (32.2 Overs); Douglas Lockhart 51* (116); James Ngoche 1/17 (10 Overs)

Scotland won by 8 wickets
Gymkhana Club Ground, Nairobi, Kenya
Umpires: Subhash Modi (Zim) & Russell Tiffin (Zim)

- Points: Scotland 20, Kenya 0

20–23 February
Scorecard

Canada	v	Afghanistan
566 (151.5 overs); S Dhaniram 130 (189); Samiullah Shinwari 4/118 [36]		264 (79.0 overs); Shabir Noori 60 (162); NR Kumar 3/58 [13]
191/4d (40.0 overs); TC Bastiampillai 73 (93); Shapoor Zadran 2/85 [16]		494/4 (106.4 overs); Mohammad Shahzad 215* (258); S Dhaniram 1/30 [11]

Afghanistan won by 6 wickets
Sharjah Cricket Association Stadium, Sharjah, United Arab Emirates
Umpires: Ahsan Raza (PAK) and RA Kettleborough (ENG)
Player of the match: Mohammad Shahzad

- Points: Afghanistan 14, Canada 6

20–23 February
Scorecard

Netherlands	v	Kenya
385 (105.1 overs); RN ten Doeschate 212* (282); E Otieno 4/57 [25.1]		433 (110.0 overs); DO Obuya 115 (190); RN ten Doeschate 5/104 [23]
367/6d (53. overs); ES Szwarczynski 93 (165); E Otieno 3/59 [17]		320/5 (52.0 overs); RR Patel 87 (109); RN ten Doeschate 2/70 [15]

Kenya won by 5 wickets
Gymkhana Club Ground, Nairobi, Kenya
Umpires: SR Modi and Zameer Haider (PAK)

- Points: Kenya 20, Netherlands 0

=== 2010 season ===
10–13 June
Scorecard

Netherlands	v	Scotland
210 (90 overs); Wilfred Diepeveen 72* (141); Matthew Parker 4/69 (24 overs)		391 (133.2 overs); Richie Berrington 82 (161); Pieter Seelaar 3/67 (18.2 overs)
257 (96.2 overs); Peter Borren 109 (192); Richie Berrington 3/48 (17 overs)		77/6 (24.2 overs); Majid Haq 34* (31); Mark Jonkman 5/21 (12 overs)

Scotland won by 4 wickets
Sportpark Het Schootsveld, Deventer, the Netherlands
Umpires: Niels Bagh (Den) and Brian Jerling (SA)

- Scotland won the toss and elected to field.
- Points: Scotland 20, Netherlands 0

25–28 July
Scorecard

Zimbabwe XI	v	Netherlands
298 (89 overs); Craig Ervine 145 (238); Berend Westdijk 4/46 (13 overs)		186 (75.5 overs); Wesley Barresi 81 (163); Natsai Mushangwe 3/47 (18.5 overs)
305/5d (70.3 overs); Vusi Sibanda 88 (150); Maurits Jonkman 2/63 (13 overs)		280 (94 overs); Pieter Seelaar 81* (162); Timycen Maruma 3/44 (11 overs)

Zimbabwe XI won by 137 runs
VRA Ground, Amstelveen, the Netherlands
Umpires: Paul Baldwin (Ger) and Kumar Dharmasena (SL)

- Zimbabwe XI won the toss and elected to bat.
- Points: Zimbabwe XI 20, Netherlands 0.

2–5 August
Scorecard

Canada	v	Zimbabwe XI
129 (54.2 overs); Rizwan Cheema 46* (111); Tendai Chatara 3/21 (12.2 overs)		351 (97.1 overs); Craig Ervine 177 (284); Umar Bhatti 6/98 (28 overs)
149 (56.5 overs); Hamza Tariq 39 (81); Shingirai Masakadza 5/58 (22 overs)

Zimbabwe XI won by an innings and 73 runs
Maple Leaf Cricket Club, King City, Ontario, Canada
Umpires: Karran Bayney (Can) and Roger Dill (Ber)
Player of the match: Umar Bhatti (Can)

- Points: Zimbabwe XI 20, Canada 0.

11–14 August
Scorecard

Afghanistan	v	Scotland
435 (126.5 overs); Samiullah Shinwari 102 (194); Gordon Drummond 2/60 (27 overs)		139 (61.4 overs); Dewald Nel 36 (49); Hameed Hasan 6/40 (18 overs)
249/5d (61.5 overs); Mohammad Shahzad 105* (126); Majid Haq 2/66 (21 overs)		316 (110.5 overs); Ewan Chalmers 67 (126); Hameed Hasan 5/114 (33.5 overs)

Afghanistan won by 229 runs
Cambusdoon New Ground, Ayr, Scotland
Umpires: Asoka de Silva (SL) and Ian Ramage

- Points: Afghanistan 20, Scotland 0.

11–14 August
Scorecard

Netherlands	v	Ireland
188 (64 overs); Wilfred Diepeveen 41 (48); George Dockrell 4/36 (16 overs)		408 (105.1 overs); Andrew White 144 (218); Mohammad Kashif 5/53 (20.1 overs)
136 (40 overs); Peter Borren 37 (83); Allan Eastwood 4/62 (18 overs)

Ireland won by innings and 84 runs
Observatory Lane, Rathmines, Dublin, Ireland
Umpires: Niels Bagh (Den) and Johanes Cloete (SA)

- Points: Ireland 20, Netherlands 0.

=== 2010–11 season ===
31 August – 3 September 2010
Scorecard

Canada	v	Ireland
120 (32 overs); Zubin Surkari 28 (28); Trent Johnston 5/23 (9 overs)		261 (71.5 overs); Andrew White 84 (128); Henry Osinde 5/68 (21 overs)
316 (106.5 overs); Ashish Bagai 90 (157); Kevin O'Brien 5/39 (17.5 overs)		176/4 (41.1 overs); Andre Botha 61 (84); Henry Osinde 2/30 (11 overs)

Ireland won by 6 wickets
Toronto Cricket, Skating and Curling Club, Toronto, Ontario, Canada
Umpires: Karran Bayney (Can) and Chris Gaffaney (NZ)

- Canada won the toss and elected to bat.
- Points: Ireland 20, Canada 0.
- Play was reduced on Days 3 and 4 due to rain.

20 –23 September 2010
Scorecard

Ireland	v	Zimbabwe XI
465 (134.5 overs); Andrew White 102 (176); Shingirai Masakadza 5/107 (29 overs)		590 (173.2 overs); Sean Williams 178 (280); Kevin O'Brien 4/104 (30.2 overs)
151/4 (54 overs); William Porterfield 66 (104); Vusi Sibanda 1/3 (5 overs)

Match drawn
Harare Sports Club, Harare, Zimbabwe
Umpires: Shaun George (SA) and Russell Tiffin (Zim)

- Ireland won the toss and elected to bat.
- Points: Zimbabwe XI 9, Ireland 3.

26–29 September 2010
Scorecard

Zimbabwe XI	v	Scotland

Scotland won (walkover without a ball bowled)
Harare Sports Club, Harare, Zimbabwe

- Points: Scotland 20, Zimbabwe XI 0.

2–5 October 2010
Scorecard

Afghanistan	v	Kenya
464 (105 overs); Nawroz Mangal 168 (187); Elijah Otieno 4/99 (19 overs)		160 (39.5 overs); Seren Waters 73 (95); Hameed Hasan 5/70 (13 overs)
207 (49.1 overs); Javed Ahmadi 55 (59); James Ngoche 5/39 (13.1 overs)		344 (90.5 overs); David Obuya 79 (110); Hameed Hasan 6/87 (18.5 overs)

Afghanistan won by 167 runs
Nairobi Gymkhana Club, Nairobi, Kenya
Umpires: Marais Erasmus (SA) and Subhash Modi (Ken)

- Afghanistan won the toss and elected to bat.
- Points: Afghanistan 20, Kenya 0.

== Final ==
2–6 December 2010
Scorecard

Scotland	v	Afghanistan
212 (88.4 overs); Neil McCallum 104* (221); Hamid Hassan 5/45 (26.4 overs)		171 (60.1 overs); Nawroz Mangal 56 (92); Majid Haq 3/49 (22.1 overs)
82 (47.3 overs); Fraser Watts 28 (49); Mirwais Ashraf 3/8 (6.3 overs)		124/3 (26.4 overs); Mohammad Shahzad 56* (62); Matthew Parker 2/41 (9.4 overs)

Afghanistan won by 7 wickets
Dubai International Cricket Stadium, Dubai, UAE
Umpires: Kumar Dharmasena (SL) and Buddhi Pradhan (Nep)
Player of the match: Hamid Hassan (Afghanistan)

- Scotland won the toss and elected to bat.

== Summary ==
=== 2009 season ===
The tournament began in July when Scotland beat Canada in Aberdeen, inside three days. Kenya then drew with Ireland in Eglinton. Paul Stirling scored his first century in the first innings. In the third match Daan van Bunge scored 98 not for the Netherlands in the draw with Canada in Rotterdam. In August Kenya visited Canada in King City. Steve Tikolo had a brilliant performance, scoring two centuries in the match for a total of 326 runs, with Kenya winning the game by 247 runs. Afghanistan made their debut in first class cricket, visiting Mutare to play the Zimbabwe XI. Noor Ali scored two centuries in this match (230 runs), securing the draw. Tatenda Taibu also scored two centuries for 279 runs. In a match reduced by rain on the final day, Scotland and Ireland played out a draw in Aberdeen. Qasim Sheikh and William Porterfield made centuries, but Regan West took seven Scottish wickets for 88 runs in Scotland's 2nd innings. In Amstelveen, Afghanistan secured their first win, beating the Netherlands by one wicket. Afghanistan's ninth 2nd Innings wicket fell with only six runs needed for victory; Samiullah Shenwari scored the winning runs with a four for the first victory for Afghanistan in first class cricket.

=== 2009-10 season ===
Zimbabwe XI defeated Kenya with a notable performance of Vusi Sibanda, who scored 209 and 116*. Afghanistan scored their second win versus Ireland in Dambulla. Scotland made the target to obtain the win versus Kenya. Dewald Nel took 5 wickets, included to Morris Ouma, who scored 106 runs in the second inning. In February Afghanistan in Sharjah won on third occasion in the Intercontinental Cup by defeating Canada, with an amazing second innings of 494 runs. This was the ninth highest fourth-innings run chase in first-class cricket. Mohammad Shahzad contributed to the victory with 214 runs. The same day Kenya made a run chase of 320 runs versus Netherlands.

== Statistics and records ==
Statistics and records for the 2009–10 Intercontinental Cup.

Most runs

Player	Matches	Runs	Average	HS
(Afghanistan) Mohammad Shahzad	7	802	80.20	214*
(Afghanistan) Nawroz Mangal	7	593	49.41	168
(Ireland) Andrew White	6	557	69.62	144
(Afghanistan) Noor Ali	5	527	58.55	130
(Kenya) Steve Tikolo	5	516	51.60	169

Most wickets

Player	Matches	Wickets	Average	BBI
(Afghanistan) Hameed Hasan	6	43	19.18	6/40
(Scotland) Majid Haq	6	24	22.95	5/30
(Afghanistan) Mohammad Nabi	6	22	32.63	4/33
(Ireland) Trent Johnston	6	21	22.52	5/23
(Kenya) Nehemiah Odhiambo	6	21	37.57	3/60
