= 2010 ICC World Cricket League Division One =

Cricket tournament in the Netherlands

- Dates: 1 – 10 July 2010
- Administrator(s): International Cricket Council
- Cricket format: One Day International
- Tournament format(s): Round-robin
- Host(s): Netherlands
- Champions: Ireland
- Participants: 6
- Matches: 18
- Player of the series: (Netherlands) Tom Cooper
- Most runs: (Netherlands) Tom Cooper (408)
- Most wickets: (Ireland) Alex Cusack (10)
- Official website: Cricinfo site

The 2010 ICC World Cricket League Division One was a cricket tournament which took place in July 2010 in the Netherlands. It formed part of the World Cricket League competition administered by the International Cricket Council, the international governing body for cricket.

Division One, which is the successor to the now defunct ICC 6 Nations Challenge, is the highest tier of the World Cricket League, and is effectively the second level of one-day cricket for national teams below the 10 Test-playing nations. All teams competing in the 2010 Division One tournament qualified for the climax of the World Cricket League, the 2013 ICC World Cup Qualifier.

The competition was won by Ireland (who as winners of the 2009 ICC World Cup Qualifier were de facto reigning champions), defeating Scotland in the final, thus ending the tournament unbeaten.

== Teams ==
The following six teams have One Day International status.

ACA (1)

- Kenya

ACA (1)

- Canada

ACC (1)

- Afghanistan

ECC (3)

- Ireland
- Netherlands (Hosts)
- Scotland

== Squads ==
- * – Withdrawn Player.

| Afghanistan | Canada | Ireland | Kenya | Netherlands | Scotland |
|---|---|---|---|---|---|
| Nowroz Mangal (c); Mirwais Ashraf (vc); Aftab Alam; Asghar Afghan; Dawlat Ahmadzai; Hamid Hassan; Javed Ahmadi; Karim Sadiq; Khaliq Dad; Mohammad Nabi; Mohammad Shahzad (wk); Noor Ali Zadran; Samiullah Shenwari; Shabir Noori; Shapoor Zadran | Ashish Bagai (c)(wk); Rizwan Cheema (vc); Harvir Baidwan; Geoff Barnett; Trevin Bastiampillai; Umar Bhatti; Ian Billcliff; Parth Desai; Sunil Dhaniram; Jimmy Hansra; Calvert Hooper; Khurram Chohan; Nitish Kumar; Hiral Patel; Zubin Surkari; Sandeep Jyoti* | Trent Johnston (c); Andrew Balbirnie; Alex Cusack; George Dockrell; Phil Eaglestone; James Hall; Nigel Jones; Rory McCann (wk); John Mooney; Kevin O'Brien; Andrew Poynter; Paul Stirling; Albert van der Merwe; Andrew White; Craig Young; Andre Botha*; Gary Wilson* | Morris Ouma (c)(wk); Jimmy Kamande; Alfred Luseno; James Ngoche; Shem Ngoche; Alex Obanda; Collins Obuya; Nehemiah Odhiambo; Nelson Odhiambo; Thomas Odoyo; Elijah Otieno; Francis Otieno; Rakep Patel; Hiren Varaiya; Dominic Wesonga | Peter Borren (c); Bas Zuiderent (vc); Adeel Raja; Wesley Barresi; Mudassar Bukhari; Atse Buurman (wk); Tom Cooper; Tom de Grooth; Mark Jonkman; Alexei Kervezee; Bradley Kruger; Bernard Loots; Mohammad Kashif; Pieter Seelaar; Eric Szwarczynski; Maurits Jonkman; Nick Statham*; Ryan ten Doeschate* | Gordon Drummond (c); Richie Berrington; Ewan Chalmers; Gordon Goudie; Ollie Hairs; Omer Hussain; Moneeb Iqbal; Neil Laidlaw; Dougie Lockhart (wk); Ross Lyons; Neil McCallum; Gregor Maiden; Preston Mommsen; Matthew Parker; Fraser Watts; Josh Davey*; Majid Haq* |

== Fixtures ==
=== Group stage ===
==== Points table ====
| Pos | Team | Pld | W | L | T | NR | Pts | NRR | |
|---|---|---|---|---|---|---|---|---|---|
| 1 | Ireland | 5 | 5 | 0 | 0 | 0 | 10 | 0.918 | Team qualifies for 2013 ICC World Cup Qualifier and final |
| 2 | Scotland | 5 | 4 | 1 | 0 | 0 | 8 | 0.178 | Team qualifies for 2013 ICC World Cup Qualifier and final |
| 3 | Afghanistan | 5 | 3 | 2 | 0 | 0 | 6 | −0.105 | Team qualifies for 2013 ICC World Cup Qualifier and 3rd place playoff |
| 4 | Netherlands | 5 | 2 | 3 | 0 | 0 | 4 | 0.312 | Team qualifies for 2013 ICC World Cup Qualifier and 3rd place playoff |
| 5 | Canada | 5 | 1 | 4 | 0 | 0 | 2 | −0.449 | Team qualifies for 2013 ICC World Cup Qualifier and 5th place playoff |
| 6 | Kenya | 5 | 0 | 5 | 0 | 0 | 0 | −0.915 | Team qualifies for 2013 ICC World Cup Qualifier and 5th place playoff |

==== Matches ====
1 July 2010
Scorecard

| Canada; 257/7 (50 overs) | v | Afghanistan; 258/4 (48.4 overs) |
| Ashish Bagai 82 (122); Samiullah Shenwari 3/43 (10 overs) | | Nowroz Mangal 70 (58); Hiral Patel 1/28 (5 overs) |

Afghanistan won by 6 wickets
Sportpark Westvliet, Voorburg
Umpires: Niels Bagh (Den) and Brian Jerling (SA)
Player of the match: Nowroz Mangal (Afg)

- Canada won the toss and elected to bat.

1 July 2010
Scorecard

| Kenya; 163 (45.3 overs) | v | Ireland; 164/3 (39.5 overs) |
| Alex Obanda 40 (52); John Mooney 2/26 (6 overs) | | Paul Stirling 87 (106); Thomas Odoyo 1/5 (5 overs) |

Ireland won by 7 wickets
Hazelaarweg, Rotterdam
Umpires: Norman Malcolm (WI) and Ian Ramage (Sco)
Player of the match: Alex Cusack (Ire)

- Ireland won the toss and elected to field.

1 July 2010
Scorecard

| Netherlands; 234/6 (50 overs) | v | Scotland; 235/9 (49.5 overs) |
| Tom Cooper 87 (130); Gordon Drummond 2/25 (10 overs) | | Moneeb Iqbal 63 (92); Mudassar Bukhari 3/31 (10 overs) |

Scotland won by 1 wicket
VRA Ground, Amstelveen
Umpires: Kumar Dharmasena (SL) and Buddhi Pradhan (Nep)
Player of the match: Tom Cooper (Ned)

- Netherlands won the toss and elected to bat.

3, 4 July 2010
Scorecard

| Ireland; 237/9 (50 overs) | v | Afghanistan; 198 (47.1 overs) |
| Andrew Poynter 78 (109); Hamid Hassan 3/53 (9 overs) | | Shabir Noori 38 (78); Alex Cusack 5/22 (8.1 overs) |

Ireland won by 39 runs
Hazelaarweg, Rotterdam
Umpires: Brian Jerling (SA) and Buddhi Pradhan (Nep)
Player of the match: Andrew Poynter (Ire)

- Ireland won the toss and elected to bat.
- Rain ended play during the innings break.

3 July 2010
Scorecard

| Scotland; 236/4 (50 overs) | v | Canada; 126/9 (26 overs) |
| Neil McCallum 89 (78); Umar Bhatti 2/29 (10 overs) | | Hiral Patel 37 (32); Gordon Goudie 3/18 (6 overs) |

Scotland won by 69 runs (D/L)
VRA Ground, Amstelveen
Umpires: Niels Bagh (Den) and Norman Malcolm (WI)
Player of the match: Neil McCallum (Sco)

- Scotland won the toss and elected to bat.
- Rain reduced Canada's innings to 26 overs. According to the Duckworth-Lewis method, their target was 196 runs.

3 July 2010
Scorecard

| Netherlands; 229 (49.2 overs) | v | Kenya; 112 (30 overs) |
| Alexei Kervezee 92 (89); Jimmy Kamande 4/36 (9.2 overs) | | Collins Obuya 29 (41); Adeel Raja 2/3 (4 overs) |

Netherlands won by 117 runs
Sportpark Westvliet, Voorburg
Umpires: Kumar Dharmasena (SL) and Ian Ramage (Sco)
Player of the match: Alexei Kervezee (Ned)

- Kenya won the toss and elected to field.

5 July 2010
Scorecard

| Kenya; 233/7 (50 overs) | v | Afghanistan; 234/9 (50 overs) |
| Collins Obuya 60 (97); Hamid Hassan 3/32 (9 overs) | | Samiullah Shenwari 82 (118); Nehemiah Odhiambo 3/53 (10 overs) |

Afghanistan won by 1 wicket
VRA Ground, Amstelveen
Umpires: Niels Bagh (Den) and Brian Jerling (SA)
Player of the match: Morris Ouma (Ken)

- Kenya won the toss and elected to bat.

5 July 2010
Scorecard

| Scotland; 117 (47.2 overs) | v | Ireland; 120/5 (34.2 overs) |
| Neil McCallum 49 (94); Trent Johnston 2/18 (10 overs) | | Kevin O'Brien 41 (84); Gordon Drummond 2/23 (8.2 overs) |

Ireland won by 5 wickets
Sportpark Westvliet, Voorburg
Umpires: Norman Malcolm (WI) and Buddhi Pradhan (Nep)
Player of the match: Kevin O'Brien (Ire)

- Ireland won the toss and elected to field.

5 July 2010
Scorecard

| Canada; 168 (49.1 overs) | v | Netherlands; 169/3 (42.4 overs) |
| Ashish Bagai 71 (128); Bradley Kruger 3/21 (8.1 overs) | | Eric Szwarczynski 84 (121); Harvir Baidwan 2/28 (10 overs) |

Netherlands won by 7 wickets
Hazelaarweg, Rotterdam
Umpires: Kumar Dharmasena (SL) and Ian Ramage (Sco)
Player of the match: Eric Szwarczynski (Ned)

- Canada won the toss and elected to bat.

7 July 2010
Scorecard

| Canada; 154/9 (50 overs) | v | Ireland; 155/5 (39.1 overs) |
| Nitish Kumar 38 (75); Kevin O'Brien 2/21 (8 overs) | | John Mooney 44* (61); Parth Desai 3/35 (10 overs) |

Ireland won by 5 wickets
VRA Ground, Amstelveen
Umpires: Norman Malcolm (WI) and Ian Ramage (Sco)
Player of the match: Kevin O'Brien (Ire)

- Canada won the toss and elected to bat.

7 July 2010
Scorecard

| Scotland; 172/8 (50 overs) | v | Kenya; 166 (48.4 overs) |
| Fraser Watts 50 (92); James Ngoche 3/18 (10 overs) | | Alex Obanda 39 (53); Matthew Parker 4/33 (10 overs) |

Scotland won by 6 runs
Hazelaarweg, Rotterdam
Umpires: Niels Bagh (Den) and Kumar Dharmasena (SL)
Player of the match: Matthew Parker (Sco)

- Scotland won the toss and elected to bat.

7 July 2010
Scorecard

| Netherlands; 202/8 (50 overs) | v | Afghanistan; 203/4 (42.3 overs) |
| Tom Cooper 101 (155); Khaliq Dad 3/30 (10 overs) | | Nowroz Mangal 67* (53); Tom Cooper 2/19 (7 overs) |

Afghanistan won by 6 wickets
Sportpark Westvliet, Voorburg
Umpires: Brian Jerling (SA) and Buddhi Pradhan (Nep)
Player of the match: Tom Cooper (Ned)

- Afghanistan won the toss and elected to field.

9 July 2010
Scorecard

| Afghanistan; 141 (47.1 overs) | v | Scotland; 142/8 (43.5 overs) |
| Nowroz Mangal 38* (83); Ross Lyons 3/21 (10 overs) | | Fraser Watts 46 (98); Shapoor Zadran 2/19 (5.5 overs) |

Scotland won by 2 wickets
Hazelaarweg, Rotterdam
Umpires: Niels Bagh (Den) and Norman Malcolm (WI)
Player of the match: Fraser Watts (Sco)

- Afghanistan won the toss and elected to bat.

9 July 2010
Scorecard

| Kenya; 153 (45.2 overs) | v | Canada; 154/4 (35.5 overs) |
| Morris Ouma 38 (70); Harvir Baidwan 3/24 (8 overs) | | Ashish Bagai 61 (78); Thomas Odoyo 2/14 (5 overs) |

Canada won by 6 wickets
Sportpark Thurlede, Schiedam
Umpires: Brian Jerling (SA) and Ian Ramage (Sco)
Player of the match: Harvir Baidwan (Can)

- Canada won the toss and elected to field.

9 July 2010
Scorecard

| Ireland; 177 (48.2 overs) | v | Netherlands; 138 (38.5 overs) |
| John Mooney 54 (71); Bernard Loots 3/16 (8 overs) | | Peter Borren 47 (67); Paul Stirling 4/11 (6 overs) |

Ireland won by 39 runs
VRA Ground, Amstelveen
Umpires: Kumar Dharmasena (SL) and Buddhi Pradhan (Nep)
Player of the match: Paul Stirling (Ire)

- Ireland won the toss and elected to bat.

=== Playoffs ===
==== 5th place playoff ====
10 July 2010
Scorecard

| Kenya; 190 (50 overs) | v | Canada; 194/7 (49.2 overs) |
| Thomas Odoyo 39 (64); Rizwan Cheema 3/36 (10 overs) | | Zubin Surkari 49 (69); Alfred Luseno 2/23 (4 overs) |

Canada won by 3 wickets
Sportpark Thurlede, Schiedam
Umpires: Niels Bagh (Den) and Buddhi Pradhan (Nep)
Player of the match: Zubin Surkari (Can)

- Canada won the toss and elected to field.

==== 3rd place playoff ====
10 July 2010
Scorecard

| Netherlands; 218/5 (50 overs) | v | Afghanistan; 219/5 (46 overs) |
| Tom Cooper 96 (135); Mirwais Ashraf 2/20 (6 overs) | | Mohammad Shahzad 82 (108); Mudassar Bukhari 2/22 (8 overs) |

Afghanistan won by 5 wickets
Hazelaarweg, Rotterdam
Umpires: Norman Malcolm (WI) and Ian Ramage (Sco)
Player of the match: Tom Cooper (Ned)

- Netherlands won the toss and elected to bat.

==== Final ====
10 July 2010
Scorecard

| Scotland; 232 (48.5 overs) | v | Ireland; 233/4 (44.5 overs) |
| Fraser Watts 98 (112); Nigel Jones 2/20 (2.5 overs) | | Kevin O'Brien 98* (102); Gordon Drummond 1/40 (9 overs) |

Ireland won by 6 wickets
VRA Ground, Amstelveen
Umpires: Kumar Dharmasena (SL) and Brian Jerling (SA)
Player of the match: Kevin O'Brien (Ire)

- Ireland won the toss and elected to field.
