= 2011 Cricket World Cup squads =

This is a list of the squads picked for the 2011 Cricket World Cup. The oldest player at the 2011 World Cup was John Davison (40) of Canada while the youngest was Nitish Kumar (16) also of Canada.

== Group A ==
=== Australia ===
Coach: (Australia) Tim Nielsen

No.	Player	Date of Birth	ODIs	Batting	Bowling style	List A team
14	Ricky Ponting (c)	19 December 1974 (aged 36)	352	Right	Right-arm Medium/Offbreak	Tasmania
4	Doug Bollinger^{3} (withdrawn)	24 July 1981 (aged 29)	27	Left	Left-arm Fast Medium	New South Wales
23	Michael Clarke (vc)	2 April 1981 (aged 29)	183	Right	Slow Left-arm Orthodox	New South Wales
12	Callum Ferguson^{1}	21 November 1984 (aged 26)	28	Right	Right-arm Medium	South Australia
57	Brad Haddin (wk)	23 October 1977 (aged 33)	70	Right	None	New South Wales
41	John Hastings	4 November 1985 (aged 25)	2	Right	Right-arm Fast Medium	Victoria
31	David Hussey	15 July 1977 (aged 33)	24	Right	Right-arm off break	Victoria
48	Michael Hussey^{3}	27 May 1975 (aged 35)	151	Left	Right-arm Medium	Western Australia
25	Mitchell Johnson	2 November 1981 (aged 29)	86	Left	Left-arm Fast	Western Australia
18	Jason Krejza^{2}	14 January 1983 (aged 28)	1	Right	Right-arm Off-break	Tasmania
58	Brett Lee	8 November 1976 (aged 34)	187	Right	Right-arm Fast	New South Wales
36	Tim Paine (wk)	8 December 1984 (aged 26)	24	Right	Right-arm Medium	Tasmania
49	Steve Smith	2 June 1989 (aged 21)	10	Right	Right-arm Legbreak	New South Wales
32	Shaun Tait	22 February 1983 (aged 27)	25	Right	Right-arm Fast	South Australia
33	Shane Watson	17 June 1981 (aged 29)	118	Right	Right-arm Fast Medium	New South Wales
7	Cameron White	18 August 1983 (aged 27)	73	Right	Right-arm Googly	Victoria

^{1,2} Callum Ferguson and Jason Krezja replaced Michael Hussey and Nathan Hauritz respectively, who were included in the original squad but pulled out due to injury.
^{3}Michael Hussey later returned to the squad, replacing Doug Bollinger, who was ruled out with injury midway through the initial group stage.

=== Canada ===
Coach: (Canada) Pubudu Dassanayake

No.	Player	Date of Birth	ODIs	Batting	Bowling style	Domestic team
10	Ashish Bagai (c) (wk)	26 January 1982 (aged 29)	54	Right	None	Ontario
99	Rizwan Cheema (vc)	15 August 1978 (aged 32)	21	Right	Right-arm Medium	Ontario
7	Harvir Baidwan	31 July 1987 (aged 23)	19	Right	Right-arm Medium	Ontario
34	Balaji Rao	4 March 1978 (aged 32)	4	Left	Right-arm Legbreak	Ontario
9	John Davison	9 May 1970 (aged 40)	27	Right	Right-arm Offbreak	Toronto
90	Parth Desai	11 December 1990 (aged 20)	9	Right	Slow Left-arm Orthodox	Ontario
60	Tyson Gordon	31 January 1982 (aged 29)	0	Left	Right-arm Fast-medium	Alberta
57	Ruvindu Gunasekera	20 July 1991 (aged 19)	3	Left	Right-arm Legbreak Googly	Ontario
68	Jimmy Hansra	29 December 1984 (aged 26)	7	Right	Right-arm Offbreak	British Columbia
89	Khurram Chohan	22 February 1980 (aged 30)	15	Right	Right-arm Fast-medium	Alberta
21	Nitish Kumar	21 May 1994 (aged 16)	5	Right	Right-arm Offbreak	Ontario
17	Henry Osinde	17 October 1978 (aged 32)	34	Right	Right-arm Medium-fast	Ontario
13	Hiral Patel	10 August 1991 (aged 19)	12	Right	Slow Left-arm Orthodox	Ontario
22	Zubin Surkari	26 February 1980 (aged 30)	15	Right	Right-arm Medium	Ontario
5	Karl Whatham	27 August 1981 (aged 29)	0	Right	Right-arm Offbreak	British Columbia
61	Hamza Tariq (wk)	21 July 1990 (aged 20)	0	Right	None	British Columbia

=== Kenya ===
Coach: (Cricket West Indies) Eldine Baptiste

No.	Player	Date of Birth	ODIs	Batting	Bowling style	Domestic team
11	Jimmy Kamande (c)	12 December 1978 (aged 32)	81	Right	Right-arm Offbreak	(Kenya) Nairobi Gymkhana
17	Maurice Ouma (wk)	8 November 1982 (aged 28)	67	Right	None	(Kenya) Western Chiefs
89	Tanmay Mishra	22 December 1986 (aged 24)	29	Right	Right-arm Medium	(Kenya) Nairobi Gymkhana
29	James Ngoche	29 January 1988 (aged 23)	9	Right	Right-arm Offbreak	(Kenya) Western Chiefs
99	Alex Obanda	25 December 1987 (aged 23)	37	Right	Right-arm Medium	(Kenya) Eastern Aces
27	Collins Obuya	27 July 1981 (aged 29)	86	Right	Right-arm Legbreak	(Kenya) Western Chiefs
21	David Obuya (wk)	14 August 1979 (aged 31)	67	Right	None	(Kenya) Northern Nomads
35	Nehemiah Odhiambo	7 August 1983 (aged 27)	53	Right	Right-arm Medium-fast	(Kenya) Southern Stars
5	Thomas Odoyo	12 May 1978 (aged 32)	129	Right	Right-arm Medium-fast	(Zimbabwe) Southern Rocks
77	Peter Ongondo	10 February 1977 (aged 34)	77	Right	Right-arm Medium-fast	(Kenya) Western Chiefs
39	Elijah Otieno	3 January 1988 (aged 23)	16	Right	Right-arm Medium-fast	(Kenya) Eastern Aces
52	Rakep Patel	12 July 1989 (aged 21)	23	Right	Right-arm Offbreak	(Kenya) Northern Nomads
25	Steve Tikolo	25 June 1971 (aged 39)	129	Right	Right-arm Offbreak	(Zimbabwe) Southern Rocks
4	Seren Waters	11 April 1990 (aged 20)	14	Right	Right-arm Legbreak	(England) Surrey
66	Shem Ngoche	6 June 1989 (aged 21)	5	Right	Slow Left-arm Orthodox	(Kenya) Northern Nomads

=== New Zealand ===
Coach: (New Zealand) John Wright

No.	Player	Date of Birth	ODIs	Batting	Bowling style	List A team
11	Daniel Vettori (c)	27 January 1979 (aged 32)	263	Left	Slow Left-arm Orthodox	(New Zealand) Northern Districts
42	Brendon McCullum (wk)	27 September 1981 (aged 29)	178	Right	Right-Arm Medium	(New Zealand) Otago
52	Hamish Bennett	22 February 1987 (aged 23)	2	Left	Right-Arm Fast-Medium	(New Zealand) Canterbury
70	James Franklin	7 November 1980 (aged 30)	78	Left	Left-Arm Fast-Medium	(New Zealand) Wellington
31	Martin Guptill	30 September 1986 (aged 24)	38	Right	Right-Arm Offbreak	(New Zealand) Auckland
16	Jamie How	19 May 1981 (aged 29)	35	Right	Right-arm Offbreak	(New Zealand) Central Districts
15	Nathan McCullum	1 September 1980 (aged 30)	15	Right	Right-Arm Offbreak	(New Zealand) Otago
37	Kyle Mills	15 March 1979 (aged 31)	123	Right	Right-Arm Fast	(New Zealand) Auckland
24	Jacob Oram	28 July 1978 (aged 32)	141	Left	Right-Arm Medium	(New Zealand) Central Districts
77	Jesse Ryder	6 August 1984 (aged 26)	24	Left	Right-Arm Medium	(New Zealand) Wellington
38	Tim Southee	11 November 1988 (aged 22)	38	Right	Right-Arm Fast-Medium	(New Zealand) Northern Districts
56	Scott Styris	10 July 1975 (aged 35)	174	Right	Right-Arm Medium	(New Zealand) Northern Districts
3	Ross Taylor	8 March 1984 (aged 26)	93	Right	Right-arm Offbreak	(New Zealand) Central Districts
22	Kane Williamson	8 August 1990 (aged 20)	9	Right	Right-Arm Offbreak	(New Zealand) Northern Districts
58	Luke Woodcock	19 March 1982 (aged 28)	1	Left	Slow Left-arm Orthodox	(New Zealand) Wellington

=== Pakistan ===
Coach: (Pakistan) Waqar Younis

No.	Player	Date of Birth	ODIs	Batting	Bowling style	List A team
10	Shahid Afridi(c)	1 March 1977 (aged 33)	306	Right	Right-arm Legbreak Googly	(Pakistan) Karachi
22	Misbah-ul-Haq (vc)	28 May 1974 (aged 36)	58	Right	Right-arm Legbreak	(Pakistan) Faisalabad
23	Kamran Akmal (wk)	13 January 1982 (aged 29)	123	Right	None	(Pakistan) Lahore
12	Abdul Razzaq	2 December 1979 (aged 31)	248	Right	Right-arm Medium-fast	(Pakistan) Lahore
36	Abdur Rehman	1 March 1980 (aged 30)	14	Left	Slow Left-arm Orthodox	(Pakistan) Sialkot
19	Ahmed Shehzad	23 November 1991 (aged 19)	4	Right	Right-arm Legbreak	(Pakistan) Lahore
81	Asad Shafiq	28 January 1986 (aged 25)	10	Right	Right-arm Legbreak	(Pakistan) Karachi
8	Mohammad Hafeez	17 October 1980 (aged 30)	58	Right	Right-arm Offbreak	(Pakistan) Faisalabad
50	Saeed Ajmal	14 October 1977 (aged 33)	35	Right	Right-arm Offbreak	(Pakistan) Faisalabad
14	Shoaib Akhtar	13 August 1975 (aged 35)	157	Right	Right-arm Fast	(Pakistan) Islamabad
96	Umar Akmal	26 May 1990 (aged 20)	24	Right	None	(Pakistan) Lahore
55	Umar Gul	14 April 1984 (aged 26)	75	Right	Right-arm Fast-medium	(Pakistan) Peshawar
47	Wahab Riaz	28 June 1985 (aged 25)	9	Right	Left-arm Fast-medium	(Pakistan) Lahore
75	Younis Khan	29 November 1977 (aged 33)	207	Right	Right-arm Legbreak	(Pakistan) Peshawar

^{1} Junaid Khan replaced Sohail Tanvir, who was originally selected before pulling out due to injury.

=== Sri Lanka ===
Coach: (Australia) Trevor Bayliss

No.	Player	Date of Birth	ODIs	Batting	Bowling style	List A team
11	Kumar Sangakkara (wk) (c)	27 October 1977 (aged 33)	282	Left	Right-arm offbreak	(Sri Lanka) Kandurata
27	Mahela Jayawardene	27 May 1977 (aged 33)	332	Right	Right-arm medium	(Sri Lanka) Wayamba
23	Tillakaratne Dilshan (vc)	14 October 1976 (aged 34)	194	Right	Right-arm offbreak	(Sri Lanka) Basnahira
26	Dilhara Fernando	19 July 1979 (aged 31)	141	Right	Right-arm fast medium	(Sri Lanka) Kandurata
14	Rangana Herath	19 March 1978 (aged 32)	11	Left	Slow left-arm orthodox	(Sri Lanka) Wayamba
24	Chamara Kapugedera	24 February 1987 (aged 23)	85	Right	Right-arm medium	(Sri Lanka) Kandurata
92	Nuwan Kulasekara	22 July 1982 (aged 28)	83	Right	Right-arm fast medium	(Sri Lanka) Kandurata
99	Lasith Malinga	28 August 1983 (aged 27)	77	Right	Right-arm fast	(Sri Lanka) Basnahira
69	Angelo Mathews	2 June 1987 (aged 23)	35	Right	Right-arm fast medium	(Sri Lanka) Basnahira
40	Ajantha Mendis	11 March 1985 (aged 25)	46	Right	Right-arm offbreak, Legbreak	(Sri Lanka) Wayamba
08	Muttiah Muralitharan	17 April 1972 (aged 38)	341	Right	Right-arm offbreak	(Sri Lanka) Kandurata
01	Thisara Perera	3 April 1989 (aged 21)	16	Left	Right-arm fast medium	(Sri Lanka) Basnahira
03	Thilan Samaraweera	22 September 1976 (aged 34)	44	Right	Right-arm offbreak	(Sri Lanka) Wayamba
05	Chamara Silva	14 December 1979 (aged 31)	64	Right	Legbreak	(Sri Lanka) Ruhuna
44	Upul Tharanga	2 February 1985 (aged 26)	112	Left	None	(Sri Lanka) Ruhuna

Muttiah Muralitharan and Angelo Mathews have forced the Sri Lankan team to call up Chaminda Vaas and Suraj Randiv respectively, as standbys ahead of the World Cup final against India[3]

=== Zimbabwe ===
Coach: (England) Alan Butcher

No.	Player	Date of Birth	ODIs	Batting	Bowling style	List A team
47	Elton Chigumbura (c)	14 March 1986 (aged 24)	122	Right	Right-arm Medium	(Zimbabwe) Southern Rocks
91	Regis Chakabva	20 September 1987 (aged 23)	5	Right	Right-arm Offbreak	(Zimbabwe) Mashonaland Eagles
74	Charles Coventry (wk)	8 March 1983 (aged 27)	34	Right	Right-arm Legbreak	(Zimbabwe) Matabeleland Tuskers
30	Graeme Cremer	19 September 1986 (aged 24)	37	Right	Right-arm Legbreak	(Zimbabwe) Mid West Rhinos
	Craig Ervine	19 August 1985 (aged 25)	14	Left	Right-arm Offbreak	(Zimbabwe) Southern Rocks
	Terry Duffin^{1}	20 March 1982 (aged 28)	23	Left	Right-arm Medium	(Zimbabwe) Matabeleland Tuskers
	Greg Lamb	4 March 1981 (aged 29)	9	Right	Right-arm Medium/ Offbreak	(Zimbabwe) Mashonaland Eagles
	Shingirai Masakadza	4 September 1986 (aged 24)	6	Right	Right-arm Fast-medium	(Zimbabwe) Mountaineers
28	Chris Mpofu	27 November 1985 (aged 25)	49	Right	Right-arm Fast-medium	(Zimbabwe) Matabeleland Tuskers
7	Ray Price	12 June 1976 (aged 34)	83	Right	Slow Left-arm Orthodox	(Zimbabwe) Mashonaland Eagles
23	Tinashe Panyangara^{2}	21 October 1985 (aged 25)	23	Right	Right-arm Fast-medium	(Zimbabwe) Mountaineers
44	Tatenda Taibu (wk)	14 May 1983 (aged 27)	130	Right	Right-arm Offbreak	(Zimbabwe) Southern Rocks
1	Brendan Taylor (wk)	6 February 1986 (aged 25)	112	Right	Right-arm Offbreak	(Zimbabwe) Mid West Rhinos
52	Prosper Utseya	26 March 1985 (aged 25)	121	Right	Right-arm Offbreak	(Zimbabwe) Mountaineers
14	Vusi Sibanda^{3}	10 October 1983 (aged 27)	85	Right	Right-arm Medium	(Zimbabwe) Mid West Rhinos

^{1} Terry Duffin, ^{2} Tinashe Panyangara & ^{3}Vusi Sibanda replaced Tino Mawoyo, Ed Rainsford & Sean Williams, who were included in the original squad but pulled out due to injury.

== Group B ==
=== Bangladesh ===
Coach: (Australia) Jamie Siddons

No.	Player	Date of Birth	ODIs	Batting	Bowling style	List A team
75	Shakib Al Hasan (c)	24 March 1987 (aged 23)	102	Left	Slow Left-Arm Orthodox	(Bangladesh) Khulna Division
9	Mushfiqur Rahim (wk)	1 September 1988 (aged 22)	80	Right	None	(Bangladesh) Rajshahi Division
29	Tamim Iqbal (vc)	20 March 1989 (aged 21)	76	Left	Slow Left-Arm Orthodox	(Bangladesh) Chittagong Division
62	Imrul Kayes	2 February 1987 (aged 24)	30	Left	Left-Arm Off-Break	(Bangladesh) Khulna Division
31	Junaid Siddique	30 October 1987 (aged 23)	46	Left	Left-Arm Off-Break	(Bangladesh) Rajshahi Division
42	Shahriar Nafees	25 January 1986 (aged 25)	64	Left	Slow Left-Arm Orthodox	(Bangladesh) Barisal Division
98	Mohammad Ashraful	7 July 1984 (aged 26)	164	Right	Right-Arm Leg-Break	(Bangladesh) Dhaka Division
71	Raqibul Hasan	8 October 1987 (aged 23)	49	Right	Right-Arm Leg-Break	(Bangladesh) Barisal Division
30	Mahmudullah	4 February 1986 (aged 25)	61	Right	Right-Arm Off-Break	(Bangladesh) Dhaka Division
77	Naeem Islam	31 December 1986 (aged 24)	40	Right	Right-Arm Off-Break	(Bangladesh) Rajshahi Division
13	Shafiul Islam	6 October 1989 (aged 21)	23	Right	Right-Arm Medium-Fast	(Bangladesh) Rajshahi Division
34	Rubel Hossain	1 January 1990 (aged 21)	21	Right	Right-Arm Medium-Fast	(Bangladesh) Chittagong Division
41	Abdur Razzak	15 June 1982 (aged 28)	111	Left	Slow Left-Arm Orthodox	(Bangladesh) Khulna Division
46	Suhrawadi Shuvo	21 November 1988 (aged 22)	11	Left	Slow Left-Arm Orthodox	(Bangladesh) Rajshahi Division
90	Nazmul Hossain	5 October 1987 (aged 23)	34	Right	Right-Arm Medium-Fast	(Bangladesh) Khulna Division

=== England ===
Coach: (Zimbabwe) Andy Flower

No.	Player	Date of Birth	ODIs	Batting	Bowling style	List A team
14	Andrew Strauss (c)	2 March 1977 (aged 33)	114	Left	Left-arm Medium	(England) Middlesex
9	James Anderson	30 July 1982 (aged 28)	133	Left	Right-arm Fast-medium	(England) Lancashire
7	Ian Bell	11 April 1982 (aged 28)	84	Right	Right-arm Medium	(England) Warwickshire
42	Ravi Bopara^{1}	4 May 1985 (aged 25)	54	Right	Right-arm Medium	(England) Essex
20	Tim Bresnan	28 February 1985 (aged 25)	34	Right	Right-arm Fast-medium	(England) Yorkshire
8	Stuart Broad^{3} (withdrawn)	24 June 1986 (aged 24)	73	Left	Right-arm Fast-medium	(England) Nottinghamshire
5	Paul Collingwood	26 May 1976 (aged 34)	189	Right	Right-arm Medium	(England) Durham
46	Jade Dernbach^{4}	3 April 1986 (aged 25)	0	Right	Right-arm Medium-fast	(England) Surrey
16	Eoin Morgan^{2}	10 September 1986 (aged 24)	61	Left	Left-arm Medium	(England) Middlesex
24	Kevin Pietersen^{2} (withdrawn)	27 June 1980 (aged 30)	103	Right	Right-arm Offbreak	(England) Surrey
23	Matt Prior (wk)	26 February 1982 (aged 28)	55	Right	None	(England) Sussex
95	Adil Rashid^{5}	17 February 1988 (aged 23)	5	Right	Right-arm Leg-break	(England) Yorkshire
13	Ajmal Shahzad^{4} (withdrawn)	27 July 1985 (aged 25)	5	Right	Right-arm Fast-medium	(England) Yorkshire
66	Graeme Swann	24 March 1979 (aged 31)	44	Right	Right-arm Offbreak	(England) Nottinghamshire
53	James Tredwell	27 February 1982 (aged 28)	2	Left	Right-arm Offbreak	(England) Kent
35	Chris Tremlett^{3}	2 September 1981 (aged 29)	13	Right	Right-arm Fast-medium	(England) Surrey
4	Jonathan Trott	22 April 1981 (aged 29)	12	Right	Right-arm Medium	(England) Warwickshire
6	Luke Wright	7 March 1985 (aged 25)	42	Right	Right-arm Medium	(England) Sussex
40	Michael Yardy^{5} (withdrawn)	27 November 1980 (aged 30)	20	Left	Slow Left-arm Orthodox	(England) Sussex

^{1} Ravi Bopara replaced Eoin Morgan, who was originally selected before pulling out due to injury.
^{2} Eoin Morgan later rejoined the squad, replacing Kevin Pietersen, who was ruled out with a hernia midway through the initial group stage.
^{3} Chris Tremlett replaced Stuart Broad, who was ruled out with a side injury midway through the initial group stage.
^{4} Jade Dernbach replaced Ajmal Shahzad, who was ruled out with a hamstring strain midway through the initial group stage.
^{5} Adil Rashid replaced Michael Yardy who was ruled out before England's quarter-final match with Sri Lanka after suffering from depression.

=== India ===
Coach: (South Africa) Gary Kirsten

No.	Player	Date of Birth	ODIs	Batting	Bowling style	List A team
7	Mahendra Singh Dhoni (c & wk)	7 July 1981 (aged 29)	177	Right	Right-arm medium	(India) Jharkhand
44	Virender Sehwag (vc)	20 October 1978 (aged 32)	228	Right	Right-arm offbreak	(India) Delhi
5	Gautam Gambhir	14 October 1981 (aged 29)	105	Left	Right-arm legbreak	(India) Delhi
10	Sachin Tendulkar	24 April 1973 (aged 37)	444	Right	Right arm leg break	(India) Mumbai
12	Yuvraj Singh	12 December 1981 (aged 29)	265	Left	Slow left-arm orthodox	(India) Punjab
48	Suresh Raina	27 November 1986 (aged 24)	110	Left	Right-arm offbreak	(India) Uttar Pradesh
18	Virat Kohli	5 November 1988 (aged 22)	45	Right	Right-arm medium	(India) Delhi
28	Yusuf Pathan	17 November 1982 (aged 28)	45	Right	Right-arm offbreak	(India) Baroda
34	Zaheer Khan	7 October 1978 (aged 32)	182	Right	Left-arm fast-medium	(India) Baroda
3	Harbhajan Singh	3 July 1980 (aged 30)	217	Right	Right-arm offbreak	(India) Punjab
64	Ashish Nehra	29 April 1979 (aged 31)	116	Right	Left-arm medium fast	(India) Delhi
13	Munaf Patel	12 July 1983 (aged 27)	71	Right	Right-arm medium fast	(India) Baroda
36	S. Sreesanth^{1}	6 February 1983 (aged 28)	51	Right	Right-arm medium fast	(India) Kerala
11	Piyush Chawla	24 December 1988 (aged 22)	5	Left	Right-arm legbreak	(India) Uttar Pradesh
99	Ravichandran Ashwin	17 September 1986 (aged 24)	7	Right	Right-arm offbreak	(India) Tamil Nadu

^{1} S. Sreesanth replaced Praveen Kumar, who was originally selected before pulling out due to injury.

=== Ireland ===
Coach: (Cricket West Indies) Phil Simmons

No.	Player	Date of Birth	ODIs	Batting	Bowling style	Domestic team
	William Porterfield (c)	6 September 1984 (aged 26)	44	Left	Right-arm Offbreak	(England) Gloucestershire
	Gary Wilson (wk)	5 February 1986 (aged 25)	25	Right	None	(England) Surrey
	Andre Botha	12 September 1975 (aged 35)	40	Left	Right-arm Medium	(Ireland) North County
	Alex Cusack	29 October 1980 (aged 30)	31	Right	Right-arm Medium	(Ireland) Clontarf
	George Dockrell	22 July 1992 (aged 18)	16	Right	Slow Left-arm Orthodox	(England) Somerset
	Trent Johnston	29 April 1974 (aged 36)	47	Right	Right-arm Medium-fast	(Ireland) Railway Union
	Nigel Jones	22 April 1982 (aged 28)	11	Right	Right-arm Medium	(Ireland) Civil Service North
	Ed Joyce	22 September 1978 (aged 32)	17	Left	Right-arm Medium	(England) Sussex
	John Mooney	10 February 1982 (aged 29)	29	Left	Right-arm Medium	(Ireland) North County
	Kevin O'Brien	4 March 1984 (aged 26)	52	Right	Right-arm Medium	(England) Nottinghamshire
	Niall O'Brien (wk)	8 November 1981 (aged 29)	40	Left	None	(England) Northamptonshire
	Boyd Rankin	5 July 1984 (aged 26)	23	Left	Right-arm Fast-medium	(England) Warwickshire
	Paul Stirling	3 September 1990 (aged 20)	23	Right	Right-arm Offbreak	(England) Middlesex
	Albert van der Merwe	1 June 1979 (aged 31)	8	Right	Right-arm Offbreak	(Ireland) The Hills
	Andrew White	3 July 1980 (aged 30)	49	Right	Right-arm Offbreak	(England) Northamptonshire

=== Netherlands ===
Coach: (Australia) Peter Drinnen

No.	Player	Date of Birth	ODIs	Batting	Bowling style	Domestic team
83	Peter Borren (c)	21 August 1983 (aged 27)	39	Right	Right-arm Medium	(Netherlands) VRA Amsterdam
4	Adeel Raja	15 August 1980 (aged 30)	19	Right	Right-arm Offbreak	(Netherlands) VRA Amsterdam
2	Wesley Barresi (wk)	3 May 1984 (aged 26)	9	Right	None	(Netherlands) VRA Amsterdam
7	Mudassar Bukhari	26 December 1983 (aged 27)	27	Right	Right-arm Fast-medium	(Netherlands) Amsterdam CC
82	Atse Buurman (wk)	21 March 1982 (aged 28)	15	Right	None	(Netherlands) VRA Amsterdam
26	Tom Cooper	26 November 1986 (aged 24)	10	Right	Right-arm Offbreak	South Australia
99	Tom de Grooth	14 May 1979 (aged 31)	22	Right	Right-arm Offbreak	(Netherlands) HCC Den Haag
5	Alexei Kervezee	11 September 1989 (aged 21)	30	Right	Right-arm Medium	(England) Worcestershire
21	Bradley Kruger	17 September 1988 (aged 22)	4	Right	Right-arm Fast-medium	(England) Leeds/Bradford UCCE
	Bernard Loots	19 April 1979 (aged 31)	3	Right	Right-arm Medium	(Netherlands) HCC Den Haag
3	Pieter Seelaar	2 July 1987 (aged 23)	21	Right	Slow Left-arm Orthodox	(Netherlands) Hermes DVS
13	Eric Szwarczynski	13 February 1983 (aged 28)	30	Right	None	(Netherlands) VRA Amsterdam
27	Ryan ten Doeschate	30 June 1980 (aged 30)	27	Right	Right-arm Fast-medium	(England) Essex
	Berend Westdijk	5 March 1985 (aged 25)	0	Right	Right-arm Medium	(Netherlands) HBS Craeyenhout
33	Bas Zuiderent	3 March 1977 (aged 33)	53	Right	Right-arm Medium	(Netherlands) VRA Amsterdam

=== South Africa ===
Coach: (South Africa) Corrie van Zyl

No.	Player	Date of Birth	ODIs	Batting	Bowling style	List A team
15	Graeme Smith (c)	1 February 1981 (aged 30)	163	Left	Right arm Offbreak	(South Africa) Cape Cobras
17	AB de Villiers (wk)	17 February 1984 (aged 27)	112	Right	Right-arm Medium	(South Africa) Titans
1	Hashim Amla	31 March 1983 (aged 27)	40	Right	Right-arm Medium	(South Africa) Dolphins
22	Johan Botha	2 May 1982 (aged 28)	67	Right	Right-arm Offbreak	(South Africa) Warriors
21	JP Duminy	14 April 1984 (aged 26)	54	Left	Right-arm Offbreak	(South Africa) Cape Cobras
18	Francois du Plessis	13 July 1984 (aged 26)	3	Right	Right-arm Legbreak	(South Africa) Titans
41	Colin Ingram	3 July 1985 (aged 25)	11	Left	None	(South Africa) Warriors
3	Jacques Kallis	16 October 1975 (aged 35)	307	Right	Right-arm Fast Medium	(South Africa) Warriors
65	Morné Morkel	6 October 1984 (aged 26)	36	Left	Right-arm Fast	(South Africa) Titans
36	Wayne Parnell	30 July 1989 (aged 21)	18	Left	Left-arm Fast Medium	(South Africa) Warriors
13	Robin Peterson	4 August 1979 (aged 31)	38	Left	Slow Left-arm Orthodox	(South Africa) Warriors
8	Dale Steyn	27 June 1983 (aged 27)	46	Right	Right-arm Fast	(South Africa) Titans
99	Imran Tahir	27 March 1979 (aged 31)	0	Right	Right-arm Legbreak	(South Africa) Dolphins
68	Lonwabo Tsotsobe	7 March 1984 (aged 26)	17	Right	Left-arm Fast Medium	(South Africa) Warriors
44	Morne van Wyk (wk)	20 March 1979 (aged 31)	6	Right	None	(South Africa) Knights

=== West Indies ===
Coach: (Cricket West Indies) Ottis Gibson

No.	Player	Date of Birth	ODIs	Batting	Bowling style	List A team
88	Darren Sammy (c)	20 December 1983 (aged 27)	43	Right	Right-arm Fast-medium	(Saint Lucia) Windward Islands
35	Devon Thomas^{1} (wk)	12 November 1989 (aged 21)	2	Right	None	(Antigua and Barbuda) Leeward Islands
	Kirk Edwards^{2}	3 November 1984 (aged 26)	0	Right	Right-arm Offbreak	Barbados
62	Sulieman Benn	22 July 1981 (aged 29)	18	Left	Slow Left-arm Orthodox	Barbados
	Devendra Bishoo^{3}	6 November 1985 (aged 25)	0	Left	Right-arm Legbreak	Guyana
46	Darren Bravo	6 February 1989 (aged 22)	10	Left	Right-arm Medium-fast	Trinidad and Tobago
6	Shivnarine Chanderpaul	16 August 1974 (aged 36)	261	Left	Right-arm Legbreak	Guyana
45	Chris Gayle	21 September 1979 (aged 31)	220	Left	Right-arm Offbreak	Jamaica
33	Nikita Miller	16 May 1982 (aged 28)	33	Right	Slow Left-arm Orthodox	Jamaica
55	Kieron Pollard	12 May 1987 (aged 23)	30	Right	Right-arm Medium-fast	Trinidad and Tobago
14	Ravi Rampaul	15 October 1984 (aged 26)	50	Left	Right-arm Fast-medium	Trinidad and Tobago
24	Kemar Roach	30 June 1988 (aged 22)	13	Right	Right-arm Fast	Barbados
	Andre Russell	29 April 1988 (aged 22)	0	Right	Right-arm Fast	Jamaica
53	Ramnaresh Sarwan	23 June 1980 (aged 30)	156	Right	Right-arm Legbreak	Guyana
28	Devon Smith	21 October 1981 (aged 29)	32	Left	Right-arm Offbreak	(Grenada) Windward Islands

^{1,2,3} Devon Thomas, Kirk Edwards and Devendra Bishoo replaced Carlton Baugh, Adrian Barath and Dwayne Bravo respectively, who were included in the original squad but pulled out due to injury.
