= Dutch cricket team in Ireland in 2010 =

International cricket tour in Ireland

	Ireland	Netherlands
- Dates: 11 August – 18 August 2010
Captains	Trent Johnston	Peter Borren

One Day International series
- Results: Ireland won the 2-match series 2–0
Most runs	Gary Wilson 161	Tom Cooper 93
Most wickets	Andrew White 5	Maurits Jonkman 3

The Netherlands cricket team toured Ireland from 11 to 18 August 2010. The tour consisted of one Intercontinental Cup Match and two One Day Internationals (ODIs). Ireland won all three matches by comfortable margins.

== Intercontinental Cup Match ==
11–13 August
(scorecard)

Netherlands	v	Ireland
188 (64 overs); Wilfred Diepeveen 41 (48); George Dockrell 4/36 (16 overs)		408 (105.1 overs); Andrew White 144 (218); Mohammad Kashif 5/53 (20.1 overs)
136 (40 overs); Peter Borren 37 (83); Allan Eastwood 4/62 (18 overs)

Ireland won by an innings and 84 runs
Observatory Lane, Rathmines, Dublin
Umpires: Niels Bagh (Denmark) & Johanes Cloete (RSA)

- Points: Ireland 20, Netherlands 0.

== ODI series ==
=== 1st ODI ===
16 August
(scorecard)

Ireland; 275/6 (50 overs)	v	Netherlands; 205 all out (45.1 overs)
Gary Wilson 113 (147); Maurits Jonkman 2/35 (6 overs)		Tom Cooper 68 (58); Andrew White 4/44 (10 overs)

Ireland won by 70 runs
Clontarf Cricket Club Ground, Dublin
Umpires: Niels Bagh & Johanes Cloete
Player of the match: Gary Wilson (Ireland)

- Tom Heggelman (Ned) made his ODI debut.

=== 2nd ODI ===
18 August
(scorecard)

Netherlands; 125 all out (47.2 overs)	v	Ireland; 129/1 (20.3 overs)
Pieter Seelaar 34 (62); John Mooney 2/16 (8 overs)		Paul Stirling 62 (36); Maurits Jonkman 1/21 (4 overs)

Ireland won by 9 wickets
Clontarf Cricket Club Ground, Dublin
Umpires: Niels Bagh & Johanes Cloete
