= Westdijk (surname) =

Westdijk is a Dutch surname. Notable people with the surname include:

- Berend Westdijk (born 1985), Dutch cricketer
- Robert Jan Westdijk (born 1964), Dutch film director
