= Afghan cricket team in Scotland in 2010 =

	Afghanistan	Scotland
- Dates: 11 August – 17 August 2010
Captains	Nowroz Mangal	Gordon Drummond

One Day International series
- Results: 2-match series drawn 1–1
Most runs	Karim Sadiq 114	Fraser Watts 110
Most wickets	Shapoor Zadran 4	Josh Davey 5

The Afghan cricket team toured Scotland from 11 to 17 August 2010. The tour consisted of one Intercontinental Cup Match and two One Day Internationals (ODIs).

== Intercontinental Cup Match ==
11–14 August
(scorecard)

Afghanistan	v	Scotland
435 (126.5 overs); Samiullah Shenwari 102 (194); Gordon Drummond 2/60 (27 overs)		139 all out (61.4 overs); Dewald Nel (36); Hamid Hassan (6/40) (18 overs)
246/5d (61.5 overs); Mohammad Shahzad 105* (126); Majid Haq 2/66 (21 overs)		316 all out (110.5); Ewan Chalmers 67 (126); Hamid Hassan 5/114 (33.5 overs)

Afghanistan won by 229 runs
Cambusdoon New Ground, Ayr
Umpires: Asoka de Silva (Sri Lanka) & Ian Ramage (Scotland)
Player of the match: Hamid Hassan (Afghanistan)

- Points: Afghanistan 20, Scotland 0.

== ODI series ==
=== 1st ODI ===
16 August
(scorecard)

Scotland; 224/9 (50 overs)	v	Afghanistan; 225/1 (31 overs)
Fraser Watts 55 (80); Shapoor Zadran 3/69 (10 overs)		Karim Sadiq 114* (108); Matthew Parker 1/28 (3 overs)

Afghanistan won by 9 wickets
Cambusdoon New Ground, Ayr
Umpires: Asoka de Silva (Sri Lanka) & Ian Ramage (Scotland)

- Scotland won the toss and elected to bat

=== 2nd ODI ===
17 August
(scorecard)

Afghanistan; 120 (40.2 overs)	v	Scotland; 121/4 (33.5 overs)
Samiullah Shinwari 46 (74); Josh Davey 5/9 (7.2 overs)		Fraser Watts 55* (100); Shapoor Zadran 1/13 (8 overs)

Scotland won by 6 wickets
Cambusdoon New Ground, Ayr
Umpires: Asoka de Silva (Sri Lanka) & Ian Ramage (Scotland)

- Afghanistan won the toss and elected to bat
