= Diepeveen =

Diepeveen is a surname. Notable people with the surname include:

- Cees Jan Diepeveen (born 1956), Dutch field hockey player
- Wilfred Diepeveen (born 1985), Dutch cricketer
