= Sri Lanka Triangular Series in 2010 =

Tri-nation series in Sri Lanka in 2010
- Date: 10 August 2010 – 28 August 2010
- Location: Sri Lanka
- Result: Sri Lanka won the series
- Player of the series: (India) Virender Sehwag
Teams
New Zealand	Sri Lanka	India
Captains
Ross Taylor	Kumar Sangakkara	Mahendra Singh Dhoni
Most runs
Ross Taylor 119	Tillakaratne Dilshan 239	Virender Sehwag 268
Most wickets
Kyle Mills 8	Thissara Perera 8	Praveen Kumar 9

The Tri-nation series in Sri Lanka in 2010 was the One Day International cricket tournament in Sri Lanka that was held between India, Sri Lanka and New Zealand in the month of August 2010. All the matches were held in Rangiri Dambulla International Stadium, Dambulla.

== Format ==
Points were awarded in group stage as follows:

Result	Points
Win	4 points
Tie	2 points
No result	2 points
Loss	0 points

One bonus point was awarded in a match if a team won with a run rate 25% or more higher than the losing team. (i.e. By winning within 40 overs batting second or by restrict the opposition to 80% of their target after batting first.)

== Fixtures ==
=== Group stage ===
==== Points table ====
Pos	Team	Pld	W	L	NR	T	BP	Pts	NRR
1	Sri Lanka	4	2	1	1	0	1	11	+0.960
2	India	4	2	2	0	0	2	10	-0.946
3	New Zealand	4	1	2	1	0	1	7	+0.394

==== Round 1 ====
10 August
Scorecard

New Zealand; 288 (48.5 overs)	v	India; 88 (29.3 overs)
Ross Taylor 95 (113); Ashish Nehra 4/47 (9.5 overs)		Ravindra Jadeja 20 (44); Daryl Tuffey 3/34 (8 overs)

New Zealand won by 200 runs
Rangiri Dambulla International Stadium, Dambulla
Umpires: Simon Taufel (Aus) & Ranmore Martinesz (Sri)
Player of the match: Ross Taylor

- New Zealand won the toss and elected to bat

New Zealand elected to bat and collapsed at 28/3 before Scott Styris and Ross Taylor came into the crease and scored 88 and 95 respectively this helped to push the New Zealand total to 288. India then started to bat and got of to a good start before a flurry of Indian wickets fell starting with opener Virender Sehwag, most of the batters were caught in the slip cordon. India then collapsed at 88.

13 August
Scorecard

New Zealand; 192 (48.1 overs)	v	Sri Lanka; 195/7 (40.5 overs)
BJ Watling 55 (68); Lasith Malinga 3/35 (10 overs)		Upul Tharanga 70 (109); Kyle Mills 4/41 (9.5 overs)

Sri Lanka won by 3 wickets
Rangiri Dambulla International Stadium, Dambulla
Umpires: Simon Taufel (Aus) & Kumar Dharmasena (Sri)
Player of the match: Upul Tharanga

- New Zealand won the toss and elected to bat

16 August
Scorecard

Sri Lanka; 170 (46.1 overs)	v	India; 171/4 (34.3 overs)
Tillakaratne Dilshan 45 (62); Pragyan Ojha 3/36 (9.1 overs)		Virender Sehwag 99* (100); Angelo Mathews 2/32 (7 overs)

India won by 6 wickets
Rangiri Dambulla International Stadium, Dambulla
Umpires: Asad Rauf (Pak) & Ranmore Martinesz
Player of the match: Virender Sehwag

- Sri Lanka won the toss and elected to bat

==== Round 2 ====
19 August
Scorecard

New Zealand	v	Sri Lanka

No result (abandoned with a toss)
Rangiri Dambulla International Stadium, Dambulla
Umpires: Asad Rauf (Pak) & Tyron Wijewardene (Sri)

- New Zealand won the toss and elected to bat.
- Match abandoned due to rain. Match rescheduled for 20 August.

20 August
Scorecard

Sri Lanka; 203/3 (43.3 overs)	v	New Zealand
Mahela Jayawardene 59* (72); Scott Styris 2/36 [10]

No result
Rangiri Dambulla International Stadium, Dambulla
Umpires: Asad Rauf (Pak) and Tyron Wijewardene (Sri)

- New Zealand won the toss and elected to field.
- Match abandoned due to rain.

22 August
Scorecard

India; 103 (33.4 overs)	v	Sri Lanka; 104/2 (15.1 overs)
Yuvraj Singh 38 (64); Thissara Perera 5/28 (7.4 overs)		Tillakaratne Dilshan 35 (23); Ishant Sharma 2/15 (3.1 overs)

Sri Lanka won by 8 wickets
Rangiri Dambulla International Stadium, Dambulla
Umpires: Asad Rauf (Pakistan) and Kumar Dharmasena
Player of the match: Thissara Perera (SL)

- India won the toss and elected to bat

25 August
Scorecard

India; 223 (46.3 overs)	v	New Zealand; 118 (30.1 overs)
Virender Sehwag 110 (93); Tim Southee 4/49 (10 overs)		Kyle Mills 52 (35); Munaf Patel 3/21 (7 overs)

India won by 105 runs
Rangiri Dambulla International Stadium, Dambulla
Umpires: Asad Rauf (Pak) and Asoka de Silva
Player of the match: Virender Sehwag (IND)

- India won the toss and elected to bat

=== Final ===
28 August
Scorecard

Sri Lanka; 299/8 (50 overs)	v	India; 225 (46.5 overs)
Tillakaratne Dilshan 110 (115); Munaf Patel 2/43 (9 overs)		MS Dhoni 67 (100); Thisara Perera 3/36 (9 overs)

Sri Lanka won by 74 runs
Rangiri Dambulla International Stadium, Dambulla
Umpires: Asad Rauf (Pakistan) and Asoka De Silva
Player of the match: Tillakaratne Dilshan (SL)

- Sri Lanka won the toss and elected to bat.

== Media coverage ==
=== Television ===
- Ten Sports / TEN Cricket : India, Pakistan, Middle East, Indonesia, Hong Kong and Singapore
- Doordarshan : India (Only India matches and final)
- Zee Café : England and Wales
- SuperSport : South Africa, Kenya and Zimbabwe
- Setanta Sports : Australia
- Sri Lanka Rupavahini Corporation : Sri Lanka
- Sky Network Television : New Zealand
