= Matthew Parker (cricketer) =

Scottish cricketer (born 1990)

Personal information
- Full name: Matthew Archibald Parker
- Born: 2 March 1990 (age 36); Dundee, Angus, Scotland
- Batting: Left-handed
- Bowling: Right-arm medium-fast

International information
- National side: Scotland
- ODI debut (cap 43): 15 June 2010 v Netherlands
- Last ODI: 17 August 2010 v Afghanistan
- T20I debut (cap 21): 18 March 2012 v Ireland
- Last T20I: 22 March 2012 v Netherlands

Career statistics
Competition	ODI	T20I	FC	LA
Matches	10	2	3	35
Runs scored	59	–	122	192
Batting average	9.83	–	20.33	12.00
100s/50s	0/0	–	0/1	0/0
Top score	22	–	65	23
Balls bowled	414	36	630	1,264
Wickets	12	1	14	42
Bowling average	27.25	61.00	23.78	27.92
5 wickets in innings	0	0	0	1
10 wickets in match	0	0	0	0
Best bowling	4/33	1/36	4/63	5/47
Catches/stumpings	3/–	0/–	2/–	8/–
- Source: Cricinfo, 31 March 2013

Matthew Archibald Parker (born 2 March 1990) is a Scottish cricketer. Parker is a left-handed batsman who bowled right-arm medium-fast. Formerly a bowling all-rounder before a hip injury forced him to give up bowling, Parker made his senior debut for Scotland in 2009, with his international debut coming in 2010. In total he has made forty-four senior appearances for Scotland.

== Life and career ==
Born in Dundee, Parker was educated at Arbroath High School, before attending Edinburgh's Telford College. Having played at age group level for Scotland, Parker made his senior debut for Scotland in a List A match against Warwickshire in English county cricket's 2009 Friends Provident Trophy, with him playing twice more in the competition against Kent and Somerset. The following year he made his first-class debut against the Netherlands in the 2009–10 ICC Intercontinental Cup, scoring a maiden half century with 65 runs in Scotland's first-innings. Following the match he made his One Day International (ODI) debut against the same opposition. Four days after the conclusion of this match he played his second against England at Raeburn Place, scoring two runs before he was dismissed by Graeme Swann in an English victory. Within days of this match he played in two List A matches against a touring India A.

In July 2010, he was selected as part of Scotland's fifteen man squad for the 2010 World Cricket League Division One in the Netherlands, playing in six ODI's during the tournament, during which he took a total of 8 wickets at an average of 27.37, with best figures of 4/33. Following the conclusion of the tournament, he featured in three List A matches in English county cricket's 2010 Clydesdale Bank 40, making appearances against Durham, Warwickshire and Nottinghamshire. In August 2010, Afghanistan visited Scotland for their Intercontinental Cup, with Parker playing in the first-class fixture, as well as the two ODI's which followed that fixture. These remain his final appearances to date for Scotland in ODI's. Later in the 2010 season, he made four further List A appearances in the Clydesdale Bank 40, Scotland finished second in the 2009–10 ICC Intercontinental Cup, earning them a place in the final of the tournament against Afghanistan at the DSC Cricket Stadium in Dubai, with Afghanistan winning the title with a victory by 7 wickets. This is Parker's last first-class appearance to date.

In the 2011 season, Parker made further List A appearance in county cricket's 2011 Clydesdale Bank 40, making six appearances, during which against Warwickshire at Edgbaston he took a maiden five wicket haul, with figures of 5/47 from seven overs. after which he underwent an operation on a hip injury, ruling him out of the rest of the season. He returned in February 2012, when Parker was named as part of Scotland's fourteen man squad for the 2012 World Twenty20 Qualifier in the United Arab Emirates, with Parker making his Twenty20 debut in the tournament against Uganda, before following this up by appearing against Oman in the second match. He made his Twenty20 International (T20I) debut in the third match against Ireland, before making a second T20I appearance against the Netherlands. Scotland finished the tournament in fifth place and therefore missed out on qualification for the 2012 World Twenty20 in Sri Lanka. In the 2012 season, he once again featured for Scotland in the Clydesdale Bank 40, making seven List A appearances. Having failed to recover fully from the hip operation carried out in 2011, Parker was advised by a specialist in November 2012 to no longer bowl.
