= Indian cricket team in Sri Lanka in 2010 =

	India	Sri Lanka
- Dates: 18 July – 7 August 2010
Captains	Mahendra Singh Dhoni	Kumar Sangakkara

Test series
- Result: 3-match series drawn 1–1
Most runs	Sachin Tendulkar (390)	Kumar Sangakkara (467)
Most wickets	Pragyan Ojha (8)	Suraj Randiv (11)
- Player of the series: Virender Sehwag (Ind)

The Indian cricket team toured Sri Lanka, playing three Test matches from 18 July to 7 August 2010.

== Squads ==
The squads of the four teams participating in the tournament were announced in early June by the respective cricket boards.

Squads
India	Sri Lanka
Mahendra Singh Dhoni (c) (wk)	Kumar Sangakkara (c) (wk)
Dinesh Karthik (vc)	Muttiah Muralitharan (vc)
Ravichandran Ashwin	Rangana Herath
Ashok Dinda	Mahela Jayawardene
Gautam Gambhir	Suraj Randiv
Harbhajan Singh	Thilina Kandamby
Ravindra Jadeja	Chamara Kapugedera
Zaheer Khan	Nuwan Kulasekara
Virat Kohli	Farveez Maharoof
Praveen Kumar	Lasith Malinga
Ashish Nehra	Angelo Mathews
Pragyan Ojha	Thilan Samaraweera
Suresh Raina	Upul Tharanga
Rohit Sharma	Chanaka Welegedara
Saurabh Tiwary

== Test Series ==
=== 1st Test ===
18–22 July
Scorecard

Sri Lanka	v	India
520/8d (124 overs); Tharanga Paranavitana 111 (289); Abhimanyu Mithun 4/105 (28 overs)		276 (65 overs); Virender Sehwag 109 (118); Muttiah Muralitharan 5/63 (17 overs)
96/0 (14.1 overs); Tillakaratne Dilshan 68* (47); Pragyan Ojha 0/11 (3 overs)		338 (115.4 overs) (f/o); Sachin Tendulkar 84 (168); Lasith Malinga 5/50 (17 overs)

Sri Lanka won by 10 wickets
Galle International Stadium, Galle
Umpires: Daryl Harper (Aus) and Rod Tucker (Aus)
Player of the match: Lasith Malinga (SL)

- Sri Lanka won the toss and elected to bat.
- Bad light ended play after 68 overs on Day 1.
- Rain prevented play on Day 2.
- Abhimanyu Mithun (Ind) made his Test debut.
- Muttiah Muralitharan (SL) announced that he would retire from Test cricket following this match. On the last day of the match, and on the last wicket of the match, he earned his 800th career Test wicket.

=== 2nd Test ===
26–30 July
Scorecard

Sri Lanka	v	India
642/4d (159.4 overs); Kumar Sangakkara 219 (335); Virender Sehwag 1/71 (20 overs)		707 (225.2 overs); Sachin Tendulkar 203 (347); Ajantha Mendis 4/172 (63 overs)
129/3 (45 overs); Kumar Sangakkara 42* (114); Abhimanyu Mithun 1/17 (6 overs)

Match drawn
Sinhalese Sports Club, Colombo
Umpires: Daryl Harper (Aus) and Rod Tucker (Aus)
Player of the match: Kumar Sangakkara (SL)

- Sri Lanka won the toss and elected to bat.
- Suresh Raina (Ind) and Suraj Randiv (SL) made their Test debuts.
- Suresh Raina (Ind) scored his first century in Tests.

=== 3rd Test ===
3–7 August
Scorecard

Sri Lanka	v	India
425 (138 overs); Thilan Samaraweera 137* (288); Pragyan Ojha 4/115 (46 overs)		436 (106.1 overs); Virender Sehwag 109 (105); Suraj Randiv 4/80 (25.1 overs)
267 (85.2 overs); Thilan Samaraweera 83 (139); Amit Mishra 3/47 (17.2 overs)		258/5 (68.3 overs); VVS Laxman 103* (149); Suraj Randiv 5/82 (29 overs)

India won by 5 wickets
P. Sara Oval, Colombo
Umpires: Simon Taufel (Aus) and Rod Tucker (Aus)
Player of the match: VVS Laxman (Ind)

- Sri Lanka won the toss and elected to bat.
- Bad light ended play after 86.5 overs on day 1, and 86.1 overs on day 2.
- Sachin Tendulkar (Ind) broke Steve Waugh's (Aus) record for most appearances in Tests (169).

== Tour Match ==
=== Sri Lanka Board President's XI vs Indians ===
13–15 July
Scorecard

Sri Lanka Board President's XI	v	Indians
514/9d (104.3 overs); Upul Tharanga 110 (116); Pragyan Ojha 5/153 (27.3 overs)		291 (64.2 overs); Yuvraj Singh 118 (146); Ajantha Mendis 6/67 (17.2 overs)
260/6 (61.1 overs); Lahiru Thirimanne 102 (142); Pragyan Ojha 3/85(22 overs)

Match drawn
Colts Cricket Club Ground, Colombo
Umpires: Gamini Dissanayake and Lyndon Hannibal

- Sri Lanka Board President's XI won the toss and elelcted to bat.

== Media Coverage ==
=== Television ===
- Ten Sports : India, Pakistan, Middle East, Indonesia, Hong Kong and Singapore
- Zee cafe : England and Wales
- SuperSport (South African broadcaster) : South Africa, Kenya and Zimbabwe
- Setanta Sports Australia : Australia
- Sri Lanka Rupavahini Corporation : Sri Lanka
- Sky Network Television : New Zealand

=== Internet ===
http://www.srilankacricket.lk – Online commentary only
