= 2010 Global Champions Tour =

The 2010 Global Champions Tour was the fifth edition of the Global Champions Tour (GCT), an important international show jumping competition series. The series was held mainly in Europe, one competition was held outside of Europe. All competitions were endowed at least 285000 €. All GCT events was held as CSI 5*.

The competitions was held between May 7, 2010, and August 29, 2010. There was no final. At the end of the season the best 18 riders in the final overall standings has got a bonus prize money, in total €1,000,000

== Competitions ==
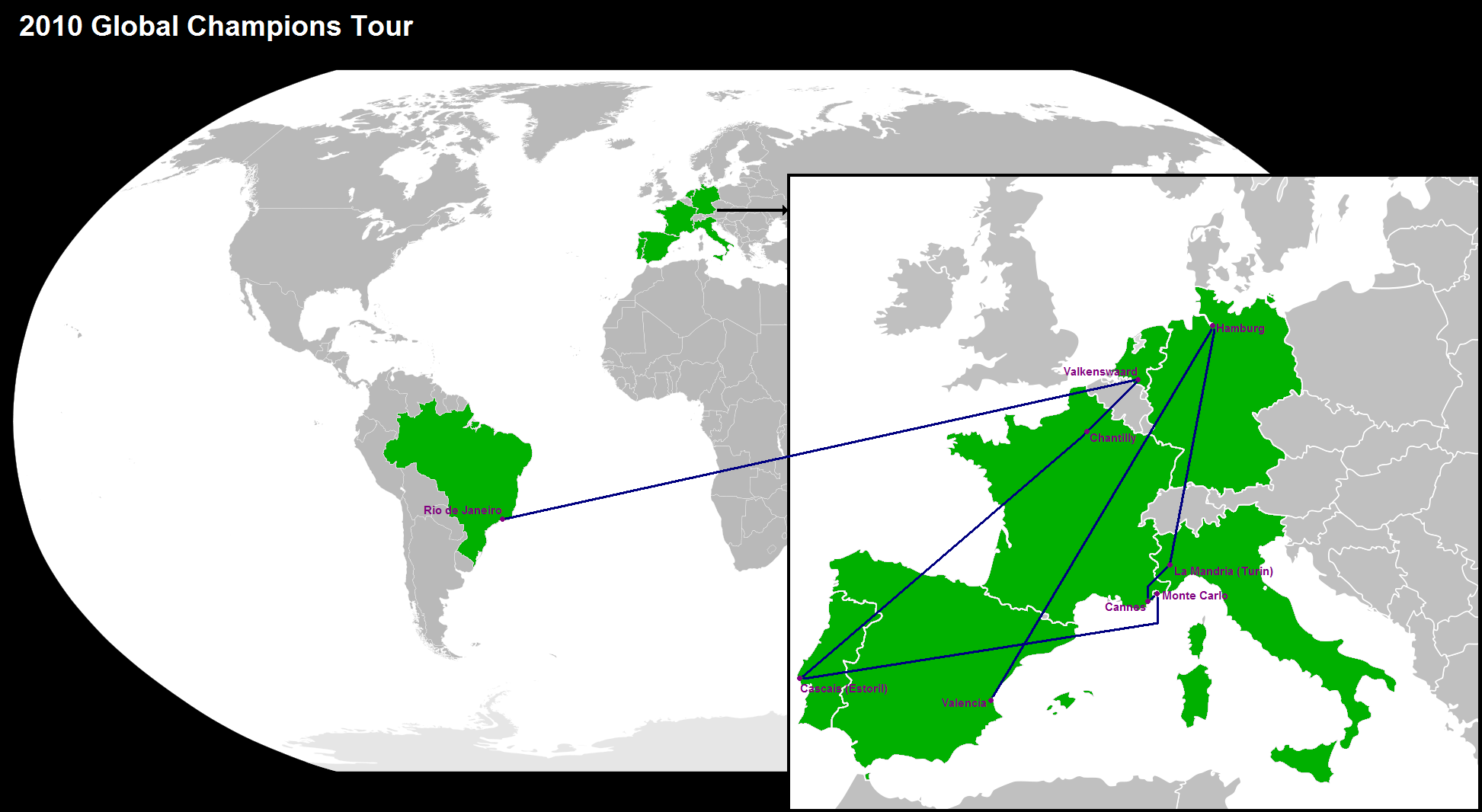
competitions of the 2010 Global Champions Tour

All competitions are held as competition over two rounds against the clock with one jump-off against the clock.

=== 1st Competition: Global Champions Tour of Spain ===
May 7, 2010 to May 9, 2010 – Museo de las Ciencias Príncipe Felipe, Ciutat de les Arts i les Ciències, Valencia, Spain
Competition: Saturday, May 8, 2010 – Start: 4:00 pm, prize money: €285000

	Rider	Horse	Round 1		Round 2		Jump-off		scoring points
	Rider	Horse	Penalties	Time (s)	Penalties	Time (s)	Penalties	Time (s)	scoring points
1	(France) Timothée Anciaume	Lamm de Fetan	0	-	0	-	0	45.00	40
2	(Germany) Marcus Ehning	Sabrina	0	-	0	-	0	45.32	37
3	(Belgium) Jos Lansink	Valentina van't Heike	0	-	0	-	4	42.95	35

(Top 3 of 49 Competitors)

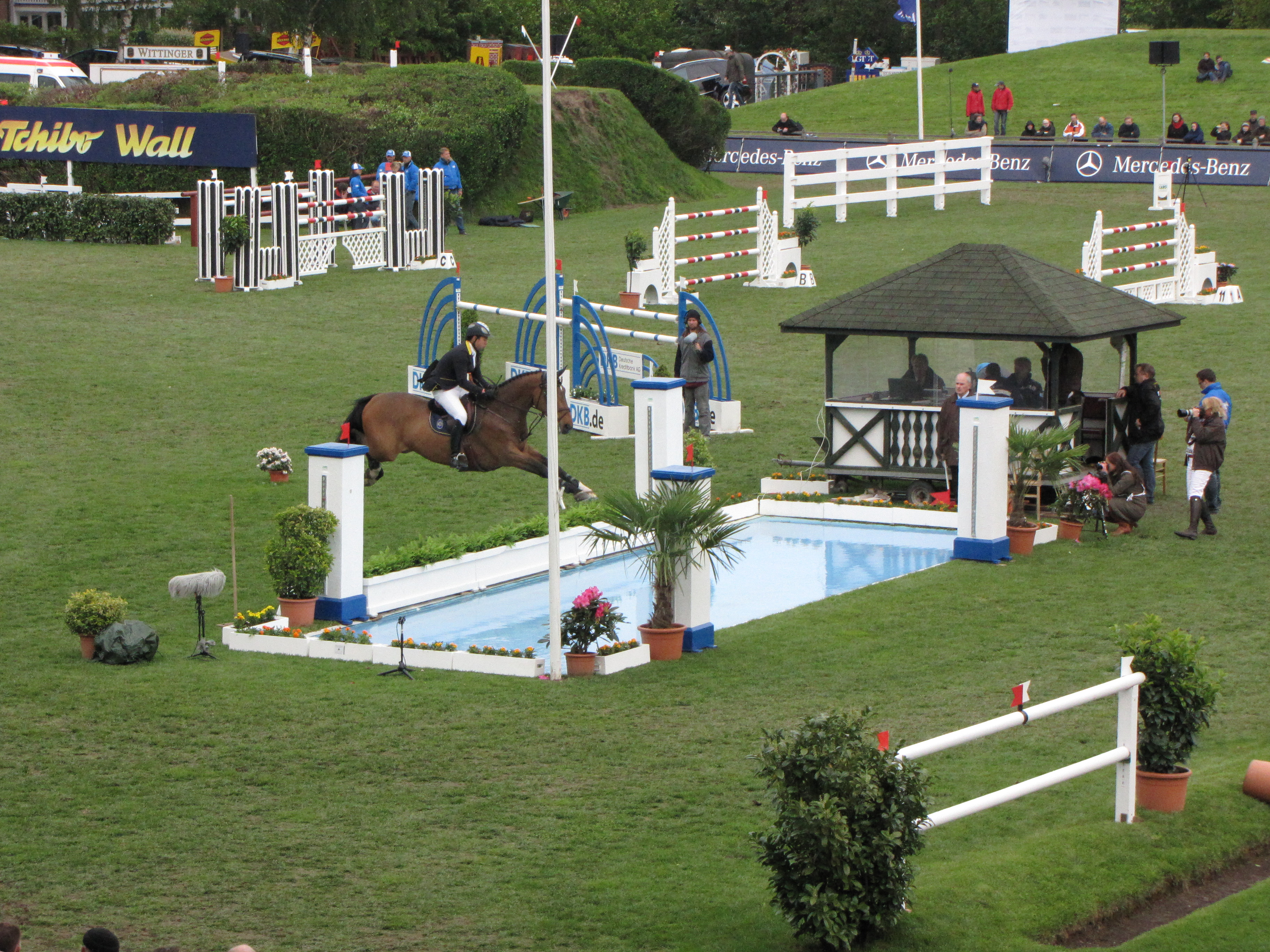
Kenneth Cheng at the 2010 Global Champions Tour of Germany

=== 2nd Competition: Global Champions Tour of Germany ===
May 13, 2010 to May 16, 2010 – Hamburg (German show jumping and dressage derby), Germany
Competition: Saturday, May 15, 2010 – Start: 2:00 pm, prize money: €285000

	Rider	Horse	Round 1		Round 2		Jump-off		scoring points
	Rider	Horse	Penalties	Time (s)	Penalties	Time (s)	Penalties	Time (s)	scoring points
1	(United States) Lauren Hough	Quick Study	0	-	0	-	0	42.46	40
2	(Australia) Edwina Alexander	Itot du Château	0	-	0	-	4	38.43	37
3	(United States) Laura Kraut	Cedric	0	-	0	-	4	38.84	35

(Top 3 of 50 Competitors)

=== 3rd Competition: Global Champions Tour of Italy ===
May 20, 2010 to May 23, 2010 – La Mandria near Turino, Italy
Competition: Saturday, May 22, 2010 – Start: 2:00 pm, prize money: €300000

	Rider	Horse	Round 1		Round 2		Jump-off		scoring points
	Rider	Horse	Penalties	Time (s)	Penalties	Time (s)	Penalties	Time (s)	scoring points
1	(Germany) Marco Kutscher	Cash	0	-	0	-	0	37.98	40
2	(United Kingdom) Nick Skelton	Carlo	0	-	0	-	0	38.18	37
3	(Brazil) Rodrigo Pessoa	Rebozo	0	-	0	-	0	41.12	35

(Top 3 of 46 Competitors)

=== 4th Competition: France I ===
June 10, 2010 to June 12, 2010 – Cannes, France
Competition: Saturday, June 12, 2010 – Start: 6:00 pm, prize money: €285000

	Rider	Horse	Round 1		Round 2		Jump-off		scoring points
	Rider	Horse	Penalties	Time (s)	Penalties	Time (s)	Penalties	Time (s)	scoring points
1	(Australia) Edwina Alexander	Itot du Chateau	0	-	0	-	0	44.34	40
2	(France) Kevin Staut	Le Prestige St Lois	0	-	0	-	4	36.29	37
3	(Republic of Ireland) Jessica Kürten	Libertina	0	-	0	-	4	36.78	35

(Top 3 of 43 Competitors)

=== 5th Competition: Global Champions Tour of Monaco ===
June 24, 2010 to June 26, 2010 – shore at the marina „Port Hercule“, Monte Carlo, Monaco
Competition: Saturday, June 26, 2010 – Start: 6:00 pm, prize money: €285000

	Rider	Horse	Round 1		Round 2		Jump-off		scoring points
	Rider	Horse	Penalties	Time (s)	Penalties	Time (s)	Penalties	Time (s)	scoring points
1	(Brazil) Bernardo Alves	Bridgit	0	-	0	-	0	35.27	40
2	(Republic of Ireland) Jessica Kürten	Libertina	0	-	0	-	0	35.29	37
3	(Belgium) Jos Lansink	Valentina van't Heike	0	-	0	-	0	40.21	35

(Top 3 of 44 Competitors)

=== 6th Competition: Global Champions Tour of Portugal ===
July 1, 2010 to July 3, 2010 – Hipódromo Manuel Possolo, Cascais near Estoril, Portugal
Competition: Saturday, July 3, 2010 – Start: 7:00 pm, prize money: €325000 (show jumping grand prix with the second-highest prize money in Europe)

	Rider	Horse	Round 1		Round 2		Jump-off		scoring points
	Rider	Horse	Penalties	Time (s)	Penalties	Time (s)	Penalties	Time (s)	scoring points
1	(Germany) Meredith Michaels-Beerbaum	Checkmate	0	-	0	-	0	44.11	40
2	(Germany) Marco Kutscher	Cash	0	-	0	-	0	45.82	37
3	(Belgium) Jos Lansink	Valentina van't Heike	0	-	0	-	0	51.87	35

(Top 3 of 41 Competitors)

=== 7th Competition: France II ===
July 23, 2010 to July 25, 2010 – Chantilly Racecourse, Chantilly, France
Competition: Saturday, July 24, 2010 – Start: 3:30 pm, prize money: €285000

	Rider	Horse	Round 1		Round 2		Jump-off		scoring points
	Rider	Horse	Penalties	Time (s)	Penalties	Time (s)	Penalties	Time (s)	scoring points
1	(United States) Laura Kraut	Cedric	0	-	0	-	0	38.22	40
2	(France) Penelope Leprevost	Mylord Charthago	0	-	0	-	0	40.39	37
3	(Australia) Edwina Alexander	Itot du Chateau	0	-	0	-	0	40.91	35

(Top 3 of 49 Competitors)

=== 8th Competition: Global Champions Tour of the Netherlands ===
August 13, 2010 to August 15, 2010 – Valkenswaard, Netherlands
Competition: Saturday, August 14, 2010 – Start: 1:45 pm, prize money: €285000

	Rider	Horse	Round 1		Round 2		Jump-off		scoring points
	Rider	Horse	Penalties	Time (s)	Penalties	Time (s)	Penalties	Time (s)	scoring points
1	(United States) Laura Kraut	Cedric	0	-	0	-	0	36.72	40
2	(Republic of Ireland) Denis Lynch	Lantinus	0	-	0	-	0	37.88	37
3	(Germany) Christian Ahlmann	Taloubet Z	0	-	0	-	4	37.17	35

(Top 3 of 50 Competitors)

=== 9th Competition: Global Champions Tour of Brasil ===
August 26, 2010 to August 28, 2010 – equestrian facility of the Sociedade Hípica Brasileira, Rio de Janeiro (Athina Onassis International Horse Show), Brazil
Competition: Saturday, August 28, 2010 – Start: 4:30 pm, prize money: €300000

	Rider	Horse	Round 1		Round 2		Jump-off		scoring points
	Rider	Horse	Penalties	Time (s)	Penalties	Time (s)	Penalties	Time (s)	scoring points
1	(Germany) Marcus Ehning	Noltes Küchengirl	0	-	0	-	0	33.23	40
2	(Republic of Ireland) Denis Lynch	All Inclusive NRW	0	-	0	-	0	33.50	37
3	(Australia) Edwina Alexander	Itot du Château	0	-	0	-	0	34.01	35

(Top 3 of 37 Competitors)

== Final standings ==
	Rider	1st Competition	2nd Competition	3rd Competition	4th Competition	5th Competition	6th Competition	7th Competition	8th Competition	9th Competition	scoring points (Total)	prize money (bonus)
1	(Germany) Marcus Ehning	37	29	24	32	(0)	30	30	(19)	40	222	300,000 €
2	(Germany) Marco Kutscher	32	33	40	33	7	37	(0)	33	(0)	215	€180,000
3	(Australia) Edwina Alexander	(0)	37	(10)	40	12	19	35	20	35	198	€120,000
4	(Belgium) Jos Lansink	35	(0)	28	28	35	35	7	25	(0)	193	€80,000
5	(Republic of Ireland) Jessica Kürten	11	21	33	35	37	9	(6)	27	—	173	€60,000

(Top 5), 7 results count for the final standing
