= Bradley Kruger =

Netherlands cricketer (born 1988)

Bradley Kruger (born 17 September 1988 in Pretoria, South Africa) is a Netherlands cricketer. He has a shirt number of 21.

== 2011 World Cup ==
Kruger was part of the Dutch squad at the 2011 World Cup held in India, Sri Lanka and Bangladesh, from 19 February to 2 April 2011.
