= Bernard Loots =

Netherlands cricketer (born 1979)

Bernardus Pieters "Bernard" Loots (19 April 1979, Prieska, South Africa) is a South African-born Dutch cricketer. He has a shirt number of 79. Loots grew up in South Africa and moved to the Netherlands in 2006

== 2011 World Cup ==
He was part of the Dutch squad at the 2011 World Cup held in India, Sri Lanka and Bangladesh, from 19 February to 2 April 2011.
