= Wilfred Diepeveen =

Dutch cricketer (born 1985)

Personal information
- Full name: Wilfred Diepeveen
- Born: 18 June 1985 (age 41); Utrecht, Netherlands
- Batting: Right-handed
- Bowling: Legbreak
- Role: Batsman

International information
- National side: Netherlands
- Only ODI: 13 September 2011 v Kenya

Career statistics
Competition	ODI	FC	LA
Matches	1	3	9
Runs scored	6	171	128
Batting average	6.00	34.20	16.00
100s/50s	0/0	0/1	0/0
Top score	6	72*	27
Catches/stumpings	0/–	2/–	3/–
- Source: CricInfo, 30 December 2013

Wilfred Diepeveen (born 18 June 1985) is a Dutch cricketer. A right-handed batsman, Diepeveen began his international career in 2000 with the Netherlands U-15 team, progressing through the U-17s, U-19s and A teams and appearing in several European championships before joining the full squad. He debuted for the Netherlands on 10 June 2010 during the 2009–10 ICC Intercontinental Cup, and top scored with 72 not out in his first innings. He made his One Day International (ODI) debut in September 2011 against Kenya, making six runs. That has been the only ODI that Diepeveen has played for the Netherlands to-date.
