= Allan Eastwood =

Irish cricketer

Personal information
- Full name: Allan William Eastwood
- Born: 22 October 1979 (age 47); Portlaoise, Ireland
- Nickname: Stretch
- Height: 6 ft 5 in (1.96 m)
- Batting: Right-handed
- Bowling: Right-arm fast

Career statistics
Competition	First-class
Matches	3
Runs scored	17
Batting average	8.50
100s/50s	0/0
Top score	9
Balls bowled	486
Wickets	9
Bowling average	32.44
5 wickets in innings	0
10 wickets in match	0
Best bowling	4/62
Catches/stumpings	0/–
- Source: CricketArchive, 20 April 2023

Allan Eastwood is an Irish cricketer. He made his international debut against The Netherlands on 11 August 2010 taking 4 wickets in the second innings.

== Background ==
Eastwood is from Roscrea in County Tipperary and began his cricketing career at Ballyeighan C.C. In his teens and early twenties he was a key member of the Ballyeighan side that won a Middle A Cup, Middle B Cup and numerous Midland and South East Cups. When Ballyeighan failed to gain promotion to senior ranks due to their lack of facilities Eastwood moved to Pembroke C.C. in Dublin.

== International career ==
After quickly establishing himself in Pembroke's first team Eastwood assumed the captaincy for the 2010 season. Impressing the Irish selectors with his action, pace and athleticism he was selected for the Ireland A side to play against the MCC at College Park, Trinity College, Dublin, on 3 August 2010. In that match he did enough to impress the watching Ireland coach Phil Simmons and was called into the first team for the game against The Netherlands the following week. In addition to his four wickets in the second innings, Eastwood opened his first class account taking the wicket of Eric Szwarczynski in the first innings. He is the second man from Roscrea to play for Ireland, the other being Harry Read over a century ago.
