= Berend Westdijk =

Netherlands cricketer (born 1985)

Personal information
- Full name: Berend Arnold Westdijk
- Born: 5 March 1985 (age 41); The Hague, Netherlands
- Batting: Right-handed
- Bowling: Right-arm medium
- Role: Bowler

International information
- National side: Netherlands
- ODI debut (cap 49): 22 February 2011 v England
- Last ODI: 28 June 2011 v Scotland
- ODI shirt no.: 53

Career statistics
| Competition | ODI | FC | LA |
|---|---|---|---|
| Matches | 4 | 4 | 10 |
| Runs scored | 1 | 22 | 4 |
| Batting average | 0.50 | 4.40 | 2.00 |
| 100s/50s | 0/0 | 0/0 | 0/0 |
| Top score | 1* | 17 | 3* |
| Balls bowled | 156 | 576 | 294 |
| Wickets | 1 | 12 | 3 |
| Bowling average | 195.00 | 28.00 | 121.66 |
| 5 wickets in innings | 0 | 0 | 0 |
| 10 wickets in match | 0 | 0 | 0 |
| Best bowling | 1/56 | 4/46 | 1/31 |
| Catches/stumpings | 1/– | 3/– | 2/– |
- Source: ESPNcricinfo, 6 April 2012

Berend Westdijk (born 5 March 1985) is a Netherlands cricketer who is known mainly for his right-arm fast-medium bowling. He was born at The Hague.

Westdijk was part of the Dutch squad at the 2011 World Cup held in India, Sri Lanka and Bangladesh, from 19 February to 2 April 2011. It was at the World Cup that his One Day International debut came, against England, at Nagpur on 22 February 2011. On debut, Westdijk's bowling was economical, though he remained wicketless, in a close, relatively high-scoring match.
