= Maurits Jonkman =

Dutch cricketer (born 1986)

Personal information
- Born: 20 March 1986 (age 40)
- Batting: Right-handed
- Bowling: Right-arm fast

Career statistics
Competition	ODI	First-class
Matches	4	4
Runs scored	20	62
Batting average	10.00	10.33
100s/50s	0/0	0/0
Top score	13	18*
Balls bowled	136	420
Wickets	6	8
Bowling average	18.33	37.12
5 wickets in innings	0	0
10 wickets in match	0	0
Best bowling	3/22	2/63
Catches/stumpings	1/–	1/–
- Source: ESPNCricinfo, 14 April 2022

Maurits Maarten Alexander Jonkman (born 20 March 1986), is a Dutch international cricketer who has represented the Netherlands in first-class and One-Day International cricket. He bats right-handed but is known best for his right-arm fast bowling.

His identical twin, Mark, also represents the Netherlands in cricket.
