= Cambusdoon New Ground =

Cricket field in South Ayrshire, Scotland

Coordinates: 55°25′50.64″N 4°38′05.14″W

- Cambusdoon

Ground information
- Location: Alloway, Ayr, Ayrshire, Scotland
- Country: Scotland
- Establishment: 1997
- Owner: Cambusdoon Sports Club
- Operator: Ayr Cricket Club
- Tenants: Scotland cricket team
- End names
- n/a n/a

International information
- First ODI: 5 August 2006: Scotland v Ireland
- Last ODI: 16 July 2022: Namibia v Nepal
- As of 16 July 2022; Source: Cricinfo.com

Cambusdoon New Ground is a cricket ground located in Ayr, Scotland. It is the home of Ayr Cricket Club and hosted three One Day Internationals (ODI) in August 2006 as part of the European Cricket Championship tournament.

== History ==
In 2006, Cambusdoon and Mannofield were Scottish grounds to be formally approved by the International Cricket Council (ICC) to host One Day International matches.

Cambusdoon is the home of Ayr Cricket Club and hosted three European Cricket Championship matches involving Scotland, Ireland and the Netherlands in August 2006. It also hosted two ODI matches in 2010 between Scotland and Afghanistan.

In July 2012, Scotland's two ICC World Cricket League (WCL) fixtures against Canada were moved to Ayr Cricket Club after The Grange in Edinburgh was declared unplayable.

In February 2017, Cricket Scotland confirmed that the ground would host the 2015–17 ICC Intercontinental Cup match between Scotland and Namibia, scheduled to take place in June.

== International centuries ==
There have been two ODI centuries scored at the venue.

No.	Score	Player	Team	Balls	Opposing team	Date	Result
1	114*	Karim Sadiq	Afghanistan	108	Scotland	16 August 2010	Won
2	100*	Mohammad Shahzad	Afghanistan	72	Scotland	16 August 2010	Won

== List of five-wicket hauls ==
There has only been one five-wicket haul at the venue.

No.	Bowler	Date	Team	Opposing team	Inn	Overs	Runs	Wkts	Econ	Batsmen
1	Josh Davey	17 August 2010	Scotland	Afghanistan	1	7.2	9	5	1.22	Won
