= 2016 Inter-Provincial Cup =

- Administrator(s): Cricket Ireland
- Cricket format: List A
- Tournament format(s): Double round-robin
- Participants: 3
- Matches: 6

The 2016 Inter-Provincial Cup was the fourth season of the Inter-Provincial Cup, the domestic List A cricket competition of Ireland. The competition is played between Leinster Lightning, Northern Knights and North-West Warriors.

The championship is in Strategic Plan of Cricket Ireland success to achieve Test Status for the national team.

== Standings ==
Team	Pld	W	L	T	NR	Pts
Leinster Lightning	4	3	0	0	1	15
Northern Knights	4	1	2	0	1	6
North West Warriors	4	2	0	0	2	4

== Squads ==
Leinster Lightning	Northern Knights	North West Warriors
John Anderson (Captain); Rory Anders; Joe Carroll; Kenny Carroll; Peter Chase; Bill Coghlan; Adrian D'Arcy; Eoghan Delany; George Dockrell; Stephen Doheny; Jamie Grassi; Dominick Joyce; Tyrone Kane; Joshua Little; Fintan McAllister; Kevin O'Brien; Andrew Poynter; Eddie Richardson; Simi Singh; Max Sorensen; Jack Tector; Sean Terry; Lorcan Tucker; Yaqoob Ali	James Shannon (Captain); Mark Adair; Mark Berry; Stephen Bunting; Allen Coulter; Adam Dennison; Christopher Dougherty; Phil Eaglestone; Peter Eakin; Shane Getkate; Michael Gilmour; Jamie Holmes; Nigel Jones; Gary Kidd; Mansoor Amjad; Graeme McCarter; Jordan McClurkin; James McCollum; Robert McKinley; Jacob Mulder; Lee Nelson; Nathan Smith; Nikolai Smith; Rusty Theron; Greg Thompson	Andy McBrine (Captain); Ross Allen; Andrew Austin; Craig Averill; Jarred Barnes; David Barr; Andrew Britton; Scott Campbell; Rishi Chopra; Varun Chopra; Rickie-Lee Dougherty; Aaron Gillespie; Ryan Hunter; Danza Hyatt; Ryan MacBeth; Gary McClintock; William McClintock; Marco Marais; Jason Milligan; David Rankin; Jonathan Robinson; David Scanlon; Stuart Thompson; Oraine Williams; Craig Young

== Fixtures ==
=== 1st match ===
2 May 2016
10:45 IST
Scorecard

Northern Knights; 221 (49.4 overs)	v	Leinster Lightning (H); 226/4 (43.4 overs)
Greg Thompson 61 (59); Eddie Richardson 3/40 (10 overs)		Kevin O'Brien 89* (77); Graeme McCarter 2/35 (10 overs)

Leinster Lightning won by 6 wickets
Clontarf Cricket Club Ground, Dublin
Umpires: Michael Ross and Sum Wijesundera

- Northern Knights won the toss and elected to bat
- Points: Leinster Lightning 4, Northern Knights 0.

=== 2nd match ===
30 May 2016
10:45 IST
Scorecard

Leinster Lightning; 332/7 (50 overs)	v	North West Warriors (H); 191 (41.3 overs)
Simi Singh 136 (135); Stuart Thompson 4/64 (8 overs)		Marco Marais 66 (77); Simi Singh 4/16 (6.3 overs)

Leinster Lightning won by 141 runs
New Strabane Park, Strabane
Umpires: Noel Dunn and Paul Reynolds

- Leinster Lightning won the toss elected to bat
- Points: Leinster Lightning 5, Northern Knights 0.

=== 3rd match ===
12 June 2016
10:45 IST
Scorecard

North West Warriors; 212/8 (38 overs)	v	Leinster Lightning (H); 46/2 (10 overs)
Oraine Williams 85 (65); Peter Chase 3/22 (8 overs)		Dom Joyce 20* (29); Jarred Barnes 2/15 (5 overs)

No result
The Vineyard, Dublin
Umpires: Sameer Dutt and Graeme McCrea

- Leinster Lightning won the toss and elected to field
- Points: Leinster Lightning 2, North West Warriors 2.

=== 4th match ===
31 July 2016
10:45 IST
Scorecard

Northern Knights; 246 (48.3 overs)	v	Leinster Lightning (H); 248/6 (47.5 overs)
Shane Getkate 87 (86); George Dockrell 4/51 (10 overs)		Sean Terry 85* (101); Nathan Smith 2/41 (10 overs)

Leinster Lightning won by 4 wickets
Observatory Lane, Rathmines
Umpires: Sameer Dutt and Jareth McCready

- Northern Knights won the toss and elected to bat
- Points: Leinster Lightning 4, Northern Knights 0.

=== 5th match ===
7 August 2016
11:00 IST
Scorecard

North West Warriors; 270 (50 overs)	v	Northern Knights (H); 238/7 (41.4 overs)
Andy McBrine 66 (76); Robert McKinley 3/46 (7 overs)		Adam Dennison 73 (100); David Scanlon 2/24 (6 overs)

Northern Knights won by 3 wickets (D/L/S)
The Lawn, Waringstown
Umpires: Roland Black and Philip Thompson

- North West Warriors won the toss and elected to bat
- Points: Northern Knights 4, North West Warriors 0.

=== 6th match ===
14 August 2016
10:45 IST

North West Warriors (H)	v	Northern Knights

No result
Woodvale Road, Eglinton
Umpires: George Brolly and Alan Neill

- Points: North West Warriors 2, Northern Knights 2.

== See also ==
- 2016 Inter-Provincial Championship
- 2016 Inter-Provincial Trophy
