= 2016 Inter-Provincial Championship =

- Administrator: Cricket Ireland
- Cricket format: 3-day
- Tournament format: Double round-robin
- Champions: Leinster Lightning (4th title)
- Participants: 3
- Matches: 6

The 2016 Inter-Provincial Championship is the fourth season of the Inter-Provincial Championship, the domestic three-day (though not officially first-class) cricket competition of Ireland. The competition is played between Leinster Lightning, Northern Knights and North West Warriors. The championship will be sponsored by Hanley Energy and will be observed by International Cricket Council. The championship is in the Strategic Plan of Cricket Ireland success to achieve Test Status for the national team.

== Standings ==
The tournament was dominated by drawn matches; five of the six matches ended in a draw, with only Leinster Lightning managing a positive result from their game with North West Warriors. The highest score of the championship was 206 by Adam Dennison.

Team	Pld	W	L	D	NR	Pts
Leinster Lightning (C)	4	1	0	3	0	50
Northern Knights	4	0	0	4	0	39
North West Warriors	4	0	1	3	0	32

== Squads ==
Leinster Lightning	Northern Knights	North West Warriors
John Anderson (Captain); Rory Anders; Joe Carroll; Kenny Carroll; Peter Chase; Bill Coghlan; Adrian D'Arcy; Eoghan Delany; George Dockrell; Stephen Doheny; Jamie Grassi; Dominick Joyce; Tyrone Kane; Joshua Little; Fintan McAllister; Kevin O'Brien; Andrew Poynter; Eddie Richardson; Simi Singh; Max Sorensen; Jack Tector; Sean Terry; Lorcan Tucker; Yaqoob Ali	James Shannon (Captain); Mark Adair; Stephen Bunting; Allen Coulter; Adam Dennison; Christopher Dougherty; Phil Eaglestone; Peter Eakin; Shane Getkate; Jamie Holmes; Nigel Jones; Gary Kidd; Jamie Magowan; Mansoor Amjad; Graeme McCarter; Jordan McClurkin; James McCollum; Robert McKinley; Jacob Mulder; Lee Nelson; Nathan Smith; Nikolai Smith; Greg Thompson	Andy McBrine (c); Ross Allen; Andrew Austin; Craig Averill; Jarred Barnes; David Barr; Andrew Britton; Scott Campbell; Rishi Chopra; Varun Chopra; Rickie-Lee Dougherty; Aaron Gillespie; Ryan Hunter; Danza Hyatt; Ryan MacBeth; Gary McClintock; William McClintock; Jason Milligan; Suraj Randiv; David Rankin; Jonathan Robinson; David Scanlon; Roshen Silva; Stuart Thompson; Oraine Williams; Craig Young

== Fixtures ==
=== 1st match ===
10–12 May 2016
Scorecard

Northern Knights	v	Leinster Lightning (H)
371 (122.3 overs); James Shannon 85 (283); George Dockrell 2/52 (32 overs)		77 (37.3 overs); Joe Carroll 15 (47); Graeme McCarter 5/24 (12 overs)
		222/2 (93 overs) (f/o); Simi Singh 75* (203); Jacob Mulder 2/66 (32 overs)

Match drawn
Clontarf Cricket Club Ground, Dublin
Umpires: Alan Neill and Paul Reynolds

- Leinster Lightning won the toss and elected to field.
- Points: Northern Knights 10, Leinster Lightning 5.

=== 2nd match ===
17–19 May 2016
Scorecard

Leinster Lightning	v	Northern Knights (H)
306/3d (90 overs); John Anderson 135 (189); Nikolai Smith 1/23 (16 overs)		320/8d (94.4 overs); Jamie Holmes 53 (129); Eddie Richardson 3/55 (20.4 overs)
117/7 (57 overs); Andrew Poynter 42 (126); Graeme McCarter 3/41 (19 overs)

Match drawn
Civil Service Cricket Club Ground, Belfast
Umpires: Azam Baig and Jareth McCready

- Leinster Lightning won the toss and elected to bat.
- Points: Leinster Lightning 10, Northern Knights 8.

=== 3rd match ===
31 May–2 June 2016
Scorecard

Leinster Lightning	v	North West Warriors (H)
414 (118.2 overs); John Anderson 87 (177); Andy McBrine 3/74 (23.2 overs)		128 (54.5 overs); Danza Hyatt 37 (61); Tyrone Kane 3/15 (15 overs)
		219 (78.3 overs) (f/o); David Rankin 58 (116); Peter Chase 4/22 (11.3 overs)

Leinster Lightning won by an innings and 67 runs
Bready Cricket Club Ground, Magheramason
Umpires: David Bradley and Paul Reynolds

- Leinster Lightning won the toss and elected to bat.
- Points: Leinster Lightning 24, North West Warriors 3.

=== 4th match ===
21–23 June 2016
Scorecard

Northern Knights (H)	v	North West Warriors
277 (92.5 overs); Shane Getkate 53 (100); David Scanlon 6/37 (15.5 overs)		318 (95.3 overs); Andy McBrine 82 (85); Jacob Mulder 6/92 (27.3 overs)
225/7 (71 overs); James McCollum 76 (148); Ross Allen 3/74 (24 overs)

Match drawn
Bready Cricket Club Ground, Magheramason
Umpires: David Bradley and Alan Neill

- North West Warriors won the toss and elected to field.
- Points: North West Warriors 11, Northern Knights 10.

=== 5th match ===
8–10 August 2016
Scorecard

Northern Knights (H)	v	North West Warriors
400/6d (86.5 overs); Adam Dennison 206 (250); Craig Young 3/85 (14.5 overs)		233 (54.1 overs); Rickie-Lee Dougherty 46 (75); Phil Eaglestone 4/54 (12.1 overs)
		184/4 (53 overs) (f/o); Andrew Austin 84 (170); Phil Eaglestone 3/29 (11 overs)

Match drawn
The Green, Comber
Umpires: Martin Block and David Bradley

- Northern Knights won the toss and elected to bat.
- Points: Northern Knights 14, North West Warriors 10.

=== 6th match ===
23–25 August 2016
Scorecard

North West Warriors	v	Leinster Lightning (H)
302 (85.4 overs); Oraine Williams 121 (150); Kevin O'Brien 3/45 (14 overs)		378/9d (73 overs); George Dockrell 101 (94); Craig Young 3/89 (18 overs)
53/0 (24 overs); Ross Allen 36* (86)

Match drawn
The Village, Malahide
Umpires: Azam Baig and David Bradley

- North West Warriors won the toss and elected to bat.
- Points: Leinster Lightning 14, North West Warriors 14.

== Highest Scores ==
- 206 - A Dennison - Northern Cricket Union v North West, The Green, Comber
- 135* - J Anderson - Leinster Cricket Union v Northern Cricket Union Civil Service Cricket Club, Stormont, Belfast
- 121 - O Williams - North West v Leinster Cricket Union The Village, Malahide, Dublin
- 101 - GH Dockrell - Leinster Cricket Union v North West The Village, Malahide, Dublin

== Best Bowling ==
- 6-37 D Scanlon - North West v Northern Cricket Union Magheramason, Bready
- 6-92 J Mulder - Northern Cricket Union v North West Magheramason, Bready
- 5-24 GJ McCarter - Northern Cricket Union v Leinster Cricket Union Castle Avenue, Dublin

== See also ==
- 2016 Inter-Provincial Cup
- 2016 Inter-Provincial Trophy
