= 2015 Inter-Provincial Championship =

- Administrator: Cricket Ireland
- Cricket format: 3-day
- Tournament format: Double round-robin
- Champions: Leinster Lightning (3rd title)
- Participants: 3
- Matches: 6

The 2015 Inter-Provincial Championship is the third season of the Inter-Provincial Championship, the domestic three-day (though not officially first-class) cricket competition of Ireland. The competition is contested by Leinster Lightning, Northern Knights and North West Warriors.

== Standings ==
Team	Pld	W	L	D	NR	Pts
Leinster Lightning (C)	4	1	0	3	0	42.5
North West Warriors	4	0	0	4	0	33
Northern Knights	4	0	1	3	0	29

== Squads ==
Leinster Lightning	Northern Knights	North West Warriors
John Mooney (Captain); John Anderson; Bill Coghlan; Joe Carroll; Eoghan Delany; George Dockrell; Tyrone Kane; Fintan McAllister; Andrew Poynter; Eddie Richardson; Simi Singh; Max Sorensen; Jack Tector; Lorcan Tucker; Yaqoob Ali	Andrew White (Captain); Stephen Bunting; James Cameron-Dow; Adam Dennison; Christopher Dougherty; Phil Eaglestone; Peter Eakin; Shane Getkate; Neil Gill; Jordan McClurkin; James McCollum; Robert McKinley; Jacob Mulder; Lee Nelson; James Shannon; Alistair Shields; Greg Thompson; Rassie van der Dussen	Andy McBrine (Captain); Craig Averill; Scott Campbell; Rickie-Lee Dougherty; Jan Frylinck; Michael Loubser; Graeme McCarter; Gary McClintock; Marco Marais; David Rankin; Stuart Thompson; Kyllin Vardhan; Craig Young

== Fixtures ==
12–14 May
Scorecard

North West Warriors	v	Leinster Lightning (H)
260 (65.2 overs); Marco Marais 66 (82); Simi Singh 3/18 (3.2 overs)		101 (32.4 overs); John Anderson 37 (73); Stuart Thompson 3/24 (7 overs)
		367/5 (107 overs) (f/o); Bill Coghlan 130 (204); Craig Young 2/65 (20 overs)

Match drawn
Clontarf CC, Dublin
Umpires: Louis Fourie and Kevin Gallagher

- Leinster Lightning won the toss and elected to field.
- Points: Northern Knights 10, Leinster Lightning 6.5.

24–26 May
Scorecard

North West Warriors	v	Northern Knights (H)
272 (93.4 overs); Stuart Thompson 113 (197); Phil Eaglestone 4/64 (22 overs)		164 (47 overs); Shane Getkate 78 (79); Graeme McCarter 3/34 (14 overs)
268/5d (71 overs); Kyllin Vardhan 137* (184); Neil Gill 3/60 (10 overs)		257/5 (89 overs); James Shannon 66 (114); Craig Young 3/57 (17 overs)

Match drawn
Downpatrick CC, Downpatrick
Umpires: Mark Hawthorne and Alan Neill

- North West Warriors won the toss and elected to bat.
- Points: North West Warriors 10, Northern Knights 8.

7–9 June
Scorecard

Northern Knights	v	North West Warriors (H)
167 (54.5 overs); Greg Thompson 43 (72); Stuart Thompson 3/23 (11.5 overs)		264 (87.3 overs); Andy McBrine 76 (143); James Cameron-Dow 8/98 (30.3 overs)
124/2 (42 overs); Rassie van der Dussen 62* (115); Stuart Thompson 1/22 (6 overs)

Match drawn
Bready CC, Magheramason
Umpires: David Bradley and Roland Black

- North West Warriors won the toss and elected to field.
- Points: North West Warriors 10, Northern Knights 8.

10–12 August
Scorecard

Leinster Lightning	v	Northern Knights (H)
205 (70.3 overs); John Anderson 60 (131); James Cameron-Dow 3/35 (18 overs)		193 (86.2 overs); James Shannon 68 (196); Max Sorensen 6/34 (18 overs)
209/4 (54 overs); Fintan McAllister 92 (164); Rassie van der Dussen 2/2 (2 overs)

Match drawn
Stormont, Belfast
Umpires: Jareth McCready and Alan Neill

- Northern Knights won the toss and elected to field.
- Points: Leinster Lightning 9, Northern Knights 8.

1–3 September
Scorecard

North West Warriors (H)	v	Leinster Lightning

Match abandoned
Bready CC, Magheramason
Umpires: David Bradley and Charles McElwee

- No toss made.
- Points: North West Warriors 3, Leinster Lightning 3.

8–10 September
Scorecard

Leinster Lightning (H)	v	Northern Knights
337/9d (87.4 overs); John Mooney 125 (195); Jacob Mulder 3/85 (22 overs)		174 (68.1 overs); Shane Getkate 36 (79); Max Sorensen 3/49 (16 overs)
191/1d (30 overs); Fintan McAllister 105* (95); Shane Getkate 1/33 (4 overs)		202 (51.5 overs); Robert McKinley 56 (43); Yaqoob Ali 5/51 (10.5 overs)

Leinster Lightning won by 152 runs
Leinster CC, Rathmines
Umpires: Kevin Gallagher and Paul Reynolds

- Northern Knights won the toss and elected to field.
- Points: Leinster Lightning 24, Northern Knights 5.

== See also ==
- 2015 Inter-Provincial Cup
- 2015 Inter-Provincial Trophy
