= 2015 Inter-Provincial Trophy =

Cricket tournament in Ireland

- Dates: 1 May 2015 – 25 June 2015
- Administrator: Cricket Ireland
- Cricket format: 20 over
- Tournament format: Double Round-robin
- Champions: Leinster Lightning (2nd title)
- Participants: 3
- Matches: 6
- Most runs: John Mooney (175)
- Most wickets: Tyrone Kane (10)

The 2015 Inter-Provincial Trophy was the third edition of the Inter-Provincial Trophy, a 20 over cricket competition played in Ireland. It was held from 1 May to 25 June 2015.

Leinster Lightning won the tournament on the last day. Despite losing to North West Warriors by 15 runs, Warriors failed to gain a bonus point and so Lightning were crowned champions for the second time.

== Points table ==
The following teams competed:

| Team | Pld | W | L | T | NR | BP | Pts | NRR |
|---|---|---|---|---|---|---|---|---|
| Leinster Lightning | 4 | 3 | 1 | 0 | 0 | 1 | 13 | +0.886 |
| North West Warriors | 4 | 3 | 1 | 0 | 0 | 0 | 12 | +0.055 |
| Northern Knights | 4 | 0 | 4 | 0 | 0 | 0 | 0 | -1.042 |

Champions

== Squads ==
| Leinster Lightning | Northern Knights | North-West Warriors |
|---|---|---|
| John Mooney (Captain); John Anderson (Vice Captain); Yaqoob Ali; Kenny Carroll; Bill Coghlan; Alex Cusack; Eoghan Delany; Bobby Gamble; Dom Joyce; Tyrone Kane; Fintan McAllister; Cormac McLoughlin; Kevin O’Brien; Andrew Poynter; Eddie Richardson; Simi Singh; Max Sorensen; Fiachra Tucker; Lorcan Tucker | Andrew White (Captain); James Cameron-Dow; Chris Dougherty; Phil Eaglestone; Peter Eakin; Shane Getkate; Neil Gill; Nigel Jones; Gary Kidd; James Shannon; Greg Thompson; Rassie Van Der Dussen; James McCollum; Lee Nelson; Adam Dennison | Andrew McBrine (Captain); Andrew Austin; Craig Averill; David Barr; Rishi Chopra; Ricky-Lee Dougherty; Ryan Hunter; Graeme McCarter; Gary McClintock; William McClintock; David Rankin; Stuart Thompson; Craig Young |

== Fixtures ==
1 May 2015
Scorecard
Match report

| Leinster Lightning; 144/7 (20 overs) | v | Northern Knights (H); 139/8 (20 overs) |
| Andrew Poynter 52* (47); Gary Kidd 2/17 (4 overs) | | Nigel Jones 60 (47); Tyrone Kane 3/21 (4 overs) |

Leinster Lightning won by 5 runs
Stormont, Belfast
Umpires: Mark Hawthorne and Alan Neill

- Northern Knights won the toss and elected to field.
- Tyrone Kane took a hat-trick with the wickets of White, Getkate and Eakin.
- Points: Leinster Lightning 4, North West Warriors 0.

15 May 2015
Scorecard
Match report

| Leinster Lightning (H); 168/6 (20 overs) | v | Northern Knights; 115/8 (20 overs) |
| John Anderson 61 (36); Neil Gill 2/18 (3 overs) | | Greg Thompson 34 (19); Alex Cusack 2/16 (4 overs) |

Leinster Lightning won by 53 runs
Anglesea Road, Dublin
Umpires: Paul Reynolds and Louis Fourie

- Northern Knights won the toss and elected to field.
- Points: Leinster Lightning 5 (Bonus 1), Northern Knights 0.

22 May 2015
Scorecard
Match report

| North West Warriors; 131/6 (20 overs) | v | Leinster Lightning (H); 137/3 (17.2 overs) |
| Stuart Thompson 71* (56); Tyrone Kane 5/15 (4 overs) | | John Mooney 53* (52); Rishi Chopra 1/17 (2 overs) |

Leinster Lightning won by 7 wickets
Claremont Road, Dublin
Umpires: Azam Ali Baig and Kevin Gallagher

- North West Warriors won the toss and elected to bat.
- Points: Leinster Lightning 4, North West Warriors 0.

29 May 2015
Scorecard
Match report

| North West Warriors (H); 96/3 (11 overs) | v | Northern Knights; 96/4 (11 overs) |
| Stuart Thompson 42 (22); Lee Nelson 2/12 (2 overs) | | James Shannon 57* (32); Graeme McCarter 2/8 (2 overs) |

North West Warriors won by 3 runs D/L method
Woodvale Road, Eglinton
Umpires: Roland Black and Dermot Ward

- Northern Knights won the toss and elected to field.
- The match was reduced to 11 overs per side, Northern Knights target was 100 runs
- Points: North West Warriors 4, Northern Knights 0.

12 June 2015
Scorecard
Match report

| North West Warriors; 136/7 (20 overs) | v | Northern Knights (H); 123 (19.3 overs) |
| David Rankin 35 (34); Zac Rushe 2/19 (4 overs) | | Chris Dougherty 40 (38); Craig Young 3/13 (3.3 overs) |

North West Warriors won by 13 runs
Circular Road, Belfast
Umpires: Jareth McCready and Philip Thompson

- North West Warriors won the toss and elected to bat.
- Points: North West Warriors 4, Northern Knights 0.

25 June 2015
Scorecard
Match report

| North West Warriors (H); 200/6 (20 overs) | v | Leinster Lightning; 185/4 (20 overs) |
| David Rankin 76 (44); John Anderson 2/27 (4 overs) | | John Mooney 110* (68); Craig Young 2/32 (4 overs) |

Northern Knights won by 15 runs
Woodvale Road, Eglinton
Umpires: Roland Black and Noel Dunn

- Leinster Lightning won the toss and elected to field.
- Leinster Lightning are crowned champions.
- Points: North West Warriors 4, Leinster Lightning 0.

== See also ==
- 2015 Inter-Provincial Championship
- 2015 Inter-Provincial Cup
