= 2016 Inter-Provincial Trophy =

Cricket tournament

- Dates: 13 May – 5 August 2026
- Administrator: Cricket Ireland
- Cricket format: 20 Over
- Tournament format: Double round-robin
- Host: Ireland
- Champions: Leinster Lightning (3rdth title)
- Runners-up: North West Warriors
- Participants: 3
- Matches: 6
- Most runs: Stuart Thompson - 83
- Most wickets: Eddie Richardson - 6

The 2016 Inter-Provincial Trophy was the fourth edition of the Inter-Provincial Trophy, a 20 over cricket competition played in Ireland. It was held from 13 May to 5 August 2016. Leinster Lightning were the defending champions.

It was the final edition of the tournament without List A T20 status, which would be granted ahead of the 2017 season.

Leinster Lightning won the tournament for the third consecutive time and would go on the achieve the Irish domestic treble that season.

== Points table ==
Pos	Team	Pld	W	L	NR	Pts
1	Leinster Lightning	4	3	0	1	16
2	North West Warriors	4	2	2	0	9
3	Northern Knights	4	0	3	1	2

Source: ESPNcricinfo

Champions

=== Points summary ===
Team	Group matches			
Team	1	2	3	4
Leinster Lightning	5	10	12	16
Northern Knights	0	2	2	2
North West Warriors	0	4	4	9

Win	Loss	Tie	No result	Eliminated

- Note: The total points at the end of each group match are listed.
- Note: Click on the points or results to see the match summary.

== Fixtures ==
Match 1
13 May 2016
17:00
Scorecard

Leinster Lightning; 169/7 (20 overs)	v	North West Warriors; 128 (19.2 overs)
Kevin O'Brien 42 (24); Andy McBrine 2/21 (4 overs)		Marco Marais 36 (28); Eddie Richardson 2/18 (4 overs)

Leinster Lightning won by 41 runs
Anglesea Road Cricket Ground, Dublin
Umpires: Azam Baig and Bala Kailash

- North West Warriors won the toss and elected to field
- Points: Leinster Lightning 5, North West Warriors 0

Match 2
27 May 2016
17:00
Scorecard

North West Warriors; 130/7 (20 overs)	v	Northern Knights; 118/7 (20 overs)
David Rankin 25 (27); Shane Getkate 3/22 (4 overs)		Pieter Malan 25 (27); Stuart Thompson 2/12 (4 overs)

North West Warriors won by 12 runs
The Green, Comber
Umpires: Gary Blair and Michael Ross

- North West Warriors won the toss and elected to bat
- Ponits: North West Warriors 4, Northern Knights 0

Match 3
24 June 2016
17:00
Scorecard

Leinster Lightning; 173/8 (20 overs)	v	North West Warriors; 99 (15 overs)
Max Sorensen 36 (16); Jonathon Robinson 3/22 (4 overs)		Rickie-Lee Dougherty 39 (29); George Dockrell 3/12 (4 overs)

Leinster Lightning won by 74 runs
Woodvale Road, Eglinton
Umpires: George Brolly and Noel Dunn

- Leinster Lightning won the toss and elected to bat
- Points: Leinster Lightning 5, North West Warriors 0

Match 4
1 July 2016
17:00
Scorecard

Leinster Lightning	v	Northern Knights

Match abandoned
Anglesea Road Cricket Ground, Dublin
Umpires: John Andrews and Clive Colleran

- No toss.
- No play was possible due to rain.
- Points: Leinster Lightning 2, Northern Knights 2.

Match 5
22 July 2016
17:00
Scorecard

Leinster Lightning; 137/8 (20 overs)	v	Northern Knights; 113/7 (20 overs)
Kenny Carroll 30 (29); Jacob Mulder 3/22 (4 overs)		Rusty Theron 54* (37); Peter Chase 2/13 (4 overs)

Leinster Lightning won by 24 runs
The Green, Comber
Umpires: Michael Foster and Philip Thompson

- Northern Knights won the toss and elected to field
- Points: Leinster Lightning 4, Northern Knights 0
- Leinster Lightning won the 2016 Inter-Provincial Trophy

Match 6
5 August 2026
17:00
Scorecard

North West Warriors; 192/4 (20 overs)	v	Northern Knights; 140/6 (20 overs)
Ryan Hunter 79 (51); Nikolai Smith 2/25 (4 overs)		Shane Getkate 30 (20); Jonathon Robinson 2/15 (4 overs)

North West Warriors won by 52 runs
New Strabane Park, Strabane
Umpires: Graham McCrea and Noel Dunn

- North West Warriors won the toss and elected to bat
- Points: North West Warriors 5, Northern Knights 0

== Statistics ==
=== Most Runs ===
Runs	Innings	Average	SR	Player	Team(s)
83	3	27.66	123.95	Stuart Thompson	North West Warriors
79	1	79.00	154.90	Ryan Hunter	North West Warriors
75	4	25.00	147.05	Andy McBrine	North West Warriors
66	3	66.00	206.25	George Dockrell	Leinster Lightning
65	3	21.66	125.00	Simi Singh	Leinster Lightning

=== Most Wickets ===
Wickets	Innings	Average	Econ	Player	Team
6	3	10.66	5.81	Eddie Richardson	Leinster Lightning
5	3	11.20	7.00	Jacob Mulder	Northern Knights
5	3	11.20	5.60	Jonathon Robinson	North West Warriors
5	3	11.40	5.70	George Dockrell	Leinster Lightning
5	3	12.60	6.30	Tyrone Kane	Leinster Lightning

== See also ==
- 2016 Inter-Provincial Championship
- 2016 Inter-Provincial Cup
