= Zimbabwean cricket team in Ireland in 2019 =

International cricket tour

	Ireland	Zimbabwe
- Dates: 29 June – 14 July 2019
Captains	William Porterfield (ODIs); Gary Wilson (T20Is)	Hamilton Masakadza

One Day International series
- Results: Ireland won the 3-match series 3–0
Most runs	James McCollum (148)	Craig Ervine (156)
Most wickets	Tim Murtagh (9)	Solomon Mire (5)
- Player of the series: Tim Murtagh (Ire)

Twenty20 International series
- Results: 3-match series drawn 1–1
Most runs	Paul Stirling (83)	Craig Ervine (123)
Most wickets	Mark Adair (4)	Tendai Chatara (3); Kyle Jarvis (3)
- Player of the series: Craig Ervine (Zim)

The Zimbabwe cricket team toured Ireland in June and July 2019 to play three One Day Internationals (ODIs) and three Twenty20 International (T20I) matches. All the matches were played at the Stormont Cricket Ground in Belfast and the Bready Cricket Club Ground in Magheramason. Zimbabwe last toured Ireland in 2003.

Cricket Ireland had considered cancelling the tour, following poor ticket sales for international matches earlier in the season, but the International Cricket Council (ICC) provided a US$500,000 bailout. The T20Is were scheduled to take place on the same days and venues as the corresponding women's fixtures. However, in June 2019, the women's tour was cancelled 48 hours before it was due to take place, due to a funding issue from Zimbabwe Cricket. With the cancellation of the women's matches, Cricket Ireland revised the start time of the first men's T20I fixture.

Ireland won the first two ODIs of the tour, taking an unassailable lead in the series, and their first series win at home against a Full Member side. It was Ireland's first ODI series win at home since beating Scotland in September 2014. Ireland won the third match by six wickets to win the series 3–0, their first clean-sweep in ODIs against a Full Member team. The T20I series was tied 1–1, after the first match was washed out.

== Squads ==
ODIs		T20Is	
Ireland	Zimbabwe	Ireland	Zimbabwe
William Porterfield (c); Mark Adair; Andrew Balbirnie; Shane Getkate; Tyrone Kane; Andy McBrine; James McCollum; Tim Murtagh; Kevin O'Brien; Boyd Rankin; Simi Singh; Paul Stirling; Lorcan Tucker; Gary Wilson	Hamilton Masakadza (c); Ryan Burl; Tendai Chatara; Elton Chigumbura; Craig Ervine; Kyle Jarvis; Tinashe Kamunhukamwe; Solomon Mire; Peter Moor; Christopher Mpofu; Richmond Mutumbami (wk); Ainsley Ndlovu; Sikandar Raza; Brendan Taylor; Donald Tiripano; Sean Williams	Gary Wilson (c); Mark Adair; Andrew Balbirnie; Gareth Delany; George Dockrell; Shane Getkate; Tyrone Kane; Josh Little; Kevin O'Brien; Boyd Rankin; Paul Stirling; Greg Thompson; Lorcan Tucker; Craig Young	Hamilton Masakadza (c); Ryan Burl; Tendai Chatara; Elton Chigumbura; Craig Ervine; Kyle Jarvis; Tinashe Kamunhukamwe; Solomon Mire; Peter Moor; Christopher Mpofu; Richmond Mutumbami (wk); Ainsley Ndlovu; Sikandar Raza; Brendan Taylor; Donald Tiripano; Sean Williams

== Tour match ==
=== 50-over match: Ireland A vs Zimbabwe ===
29 June 2019
10:45
Scorecard

Ireland A 283/9 (50 overs)	v	Zimbabwe; 256 (47.2 overs)
Simi Singh 90 (104); Kyle Jarvis 2/41 (10 overs)		Sean Williams 104 (90); Peter Chase 3/44 (7.2 overs)

Ireland A won by 27 runs
Woodvale Road, Eglinton
Umpires: Roland Black (Ire) and Philip Thompson (Ire)

- Zimbabwe won the toss and elected to field.

== ODI series ==
=== 1st ODI ===
1 July 2019
10:45
Scorecard

Zimbabwe; 254/9 (50 overs)	v	Ireland; 258/6 (48.3 overs)
Craig Ervine 105 (117); Mark Adair 4/73 (10 overs)		Andrew Balbirnie 101 (112); Tendai Chatara 3/36 (9 overs)

Ireland won by 4 wickets
Bready Cricket Club Ground, Magheramason
Umpires: Shaun George (SA) and Mark Hawthorne (Ire)

- Ireland won the toss and elected to field.
- Shane Getkate (Ire) made his ODI debut.
- This was the first ODI to be played at this ground.
- William Porterfield played in his 250th match as captain of Ireland.

=== 2nd ODI ===
4 July 2019
10:45
Scorecard

Ireland; 242/9 (50 overs)	v	Zimbabwe; 237/9 (50 overs)
James McCollum 73 (92); Solomon Mire 4/43 (8 overs)		Sean Williams 58 (84); Tim Murtagh 5/21 (10 overs)

Ireland won by 5 runs
Stormont Cricket Ground, Belfast
Umpires: Roland Black (Ire) and Shaun George (SA)

- Zimbabwe won the toss and elected to field.
- Paul Stirling became the first batsman for Ireland to score 4,000 runs in ODIs.
- Tim Murtagh (Ire) took his first five-wicket haul in ODIs.

=== 3rd ODI ===
7 July 2019
10:45
Scorecard

Zimbabwe; 190 (46.5 overs)	v	Ireland; 191/4 (41.2 overs)
Sean Williams 67 (103); Tim Murtagh 3/39 (9.5 overs)		James McCollum 54 (69); Sean Williams 1/14 (4 overs)

Ireland won by 6 wickets
Stormont Cricket Ground, Belfast
Umpires: Roland Black (Ire) and Shaun George (SA)

- Zimbabwe won the toss and elected to bat.
- Shaun George (SA) umpired in his 50th ODI.
- William Porterfield (Ire) scored his 4,000th run in ODIs.
- This was William Porterfield's 50th win as captain of Ireland in ODIs.

== T20I series ==
=== 1st T20I ===
10 July 2019
12:30
Scorecard

Ireland	v	Zimbabwe

Match abandoned
Stormont Cricket Ground, Belfast
Umpires: Mark Hawthorne (Ire) and Alan Neill (Ire)

- No toss.
- No play was possible due to rain.

=== 2nd T20I ===
12 July 2019
16:00 (D/N)
Scorecard

Zimbabwe; 132/8 (13 overs)	v	Ireland; 134/1 (10.5 overs)
Craig Ervine 55 (32); Mark Adair 4/40 (3 overs)		Paul Stirling 83* (36); Tendai Chatara 1/23 (2 overs)

Ireland won by 9 wickets (DLS method)
Bready Cricket Club Ground, Magheramason
Umpires: Roland Black (Ire) and Mark Hawthorne (Ire)

- Ireland won the toss and elected to field.
- Ireland were set a revised target of 134 runs from 13 overs due to rain.
- Mark Adair and Gareth Delany (Ire) both made their T20I debuts.

=== 3rd T20I ===
14 July 2019
16:00 (D/N)
Scorecard

Ireland; 171/9 (20 overs)	v	Zimbabwe; 172/2 (16.4 overs)
Gary Wilson 47 (47); Kyle Jarvis 3/38 (4 overs)		Craig Ervine 68* (47); George Dockrell 1/16 (2 overs)

Zimbabwe won by 8 wickets
Bready Cricket Club Ground, Magheramason
Umpires: Roland Black (Ire) and Alan Neill (Ire)

- Zimbabwe won the toss and elected to field.
- Craig Ervine and Sean Williams scored an unbeaten 111 runs for the third wicket, the highest partnership for any wicket for Zimbabwe in T20Is.
