= 2021 Men's T20 World Cup squads =

The 2021 ICC Men's T20 World Cup was the seventh ICC Men's T20 World Cup tournament, which was held in United Arab Emirates and Oman. Each team selected a squad of fifteen players before 10 October 2021. The player ages are as on 17 October 2021, the opening day of the tournament, and where a player plays for more than one team in Twenty20 cricket, only their domestic team is listed (for example: at the time, Jos Buttler played for Lancashire Lightning).

== Afghanistan ==
Afghanistan announced their initial squad on 9 September 2021.

Coach: (South Africa) Lance Klusener

No.	Player	Date of birth	Batting	Bowling style	Domestic team
7	Mohammad Nabi (c)^{1}	1 January 1985 (aged 36)	Right	Right-arm off-spin
56	Fareed Ahmad^{2}	10 August 1994 (aged 27)	Left	Left-arm fast-medium
17	Sharafuddin Ashraf^{2} ^{3}	10 January 1995 (aged 26)	Right	Right-arm off-spin
87	Usman Ghani	20 November 1996 (aged 24)	Right	Right-arm medium
21	Rahmanullah Gurbaz (wk)	28 November 2001 (aged 19)	Right	–
66	Hamid Hassan	1 June 1987 (aged 34)	Right	Right-arm fast
11	Karim Janat	11 August 1998 (aged 23)	Right	Right-arm medium
19	Rashid Khan^{1}	20 September 1998 (aged 23)	Right	Right-arm leg break
14	Gulbadin Naib	16 March 1991 (aged 30)	Right	Right-arm fast-medium
50	Hashmatullah Shahidi	4 November 1994 (aged 26)	Left	Right-arm off-spin
77	Mohammad Shahzad (wk)	10 January 1987 (aged 34)	Right	—
78	Naveen-ul-Haq	23 September 1999 (aged 22)	Right	Right-arm medium-fast
88	Mujeeb Ur Rahman	28 March 2001 (aged 20)	Right	Right-arm off-spin
1	Najibullah Zadran	28 February 1993 (aged 28)	Left	Right-arm off-spin
3	Hazratullah Zazai	23 March 1998 (aged 23)	Left	Slow left-arm orthodox
Reserve players
10	Dawlat Zadran^{2}	19 March 1988 (aged 33)	Right	Right-arm fast-medium
45	Samiullah Shinwari^{2}	31 December 1987 (aged 33)	Right	Right-arm leg break
5	Fazalhaq Farooqi^{2}	22 September 2000 (aged 21)	Right	Left-arm fast-medium
Removed players
20	Shapoor Zadran^{2}	8 July 1987 (aged 34)	Left	Left-arm fast-medium
32	Qais Ahmad^{2}	15 August 2000 (aged 21)	Right	Right-arm leg-spin
40	Afsar Zazai^{2}	10 August 1993 (aged 28)	Right	–
Withdrawn players
44	Asghar Afghan^{3}	22 February 1987 (aged 34)	Right	Right-arm fast-medium

^{1}After the squad was named, Rashid Khan stepped down as the team's captain, stating that the selection committee had not gained his consent for the team. Mohammad Nabi was then named as Afghanistan's captain.

^{2}On 10 October 2021, Afghanistan named their final squad of 15 for the tournament. Afsar Zazai was removed from the reserve list, whereas Shapoor Zadran and Qais Ahmad were removed from the main squad. Sharafuddin Ashraf and Dawlat Zadran were moved to the reserve list from the main squad. Fareed Ahmad was moved to the main squad from the reserve list, whereas Samiullah Shinwari and Fazalhaq Farooqi were new additions to the reserve list.

^{3}On 31 October 2021, Asghar Afghan announced his retirement from cricket. Sharafuddin Ashraf, one of the reserve players, was named as his replacement for the rest of the tournament.

== Australia ==
Australia announced their squad on 18 August 2021.

Coach: (Australia) Justin Langer

No.	Player	Date of birth	Batting	Bowling style	Domestic team
5	Aaron Finch (c)	17 November 1986 (aged 34)	Right	Slow left-arm orthodox	Melbourne Renegades
30	Pat Cummins (vc)	8 May 1993 (aged 28)	Right	Right-arm fast	—
46	Ashton Agar	14 October 1993 (aged 28)	Left	Slow left-arm orthodox	Perth Scorchers
38	Josh Hazlewood	8 January 1991 (aged 30)	Left	Right-arm fast-medium	—
48	Josh Inglis (wk)	4 March 1995 (aged 26)	Right	—	Perth Scorchers
8	Mitchell Marsh	20 October 1991 (aged 29)	Right	Right-arm fast-medium	Perth Scorchers
32	Glenn Maxwell	14 October 1988 (aged 33)	Right	Right-arm off-spin	Melbourne Stars
55	Kane Richardson	12 February 1991 (aged 30)	Right	Right-arm fast-medium	Melbourne Renegades
49	Steven Smith	2 June 1989 (aged 32)	Right	Right-arm leg break	—
56	Mitchell Starc	30 January 1990 (aged 31)	Left	Left-arm fast	Sydney Sixers
17	Marcus Stoinis	16 August 1989 (aged 32)	Right	Right-arm medium-fast	Melbourne Stars
22	Mitchell Swepson	4 October 1993 (aged 28)	Right	Right-arm leg break	Brisbane Heat
13	Matthew Wade (wk)	26 December 1987 (aged 33)	Left	Right-arm medium-fast	Hobart Hurricanes
31	David Warner	27 October 1986 (aged 34)	Left	Right-arm leg break
88	Adam Zampa	31 March 1992 (aged 29)	Right	Right-arm leg break	Melbourne Stars
Reserve players
54	Dan Christian	4 May 1983 (aged 38)	Right	Right-arm fast-medium	Sydney Sixers
12	Nathan Ellis	22 September 1994 (aged 27)	Right	Right-arm fast-medium	Hobart Hurricanes
95	Daniel Sams	27 October 1992 (aged 28)	Right	Left-arm fast-medium	Sydney Thunder

== Bangladesh ==
Bangladesh announced their squad on 9 September 2021.

Coach: (South Africa) Russell Domingo

No.	Player	Date of birth	Batting	Bowling style	Domestic team
30	Mahmudullah (c)	4 February 1986 (aged 35)	Right	Right-arm off-spin	Chattogram Challengers
10	Nasum Ahmed	5 December 1994 (aged 26)	Left	Slow left-arm orthodox	Chattogram Challengers
3	Taskin Ahmed	3 April 1995 (aged 26)	Left	Right-arm fast	Rangpur Rangers
16	Litton Das (wk)	13 October 1994 (aged 27)	Right	–	Rajshahi Royals
55	Mahedi Hasan	12 December 1994 (aged 26)	Right	Right-arm off-spin	Dhaka Platoon
81	Nurul Hasan (wk)	21 November 1993 (aged 27)	Right	Right-arm off-spin	Chattogram Challengers
18	Afif Hossain	22 September 1999 (aged 22)	Right	Right-arm off-spin	Rajshahi Royals
34	Rubel Hossain^{1} ^{3}	1 November 1990 (aged 30)	Right	Right-arm fast-medium	Chattogram Challengers
29	Shamim Hossain	2 September 2000 (aged 21)	Left	Right-arm off-spin	–
47	Shoriful Islam	3 June 2001 (aged 20)	Left	Left-arm medium-fast	–
23	Mohammad Naim	22 August 1999 (aged 22)	Left	Right-arm medium-fast	Rangpur Rangers
15	Mushfiqur Rahim (wk)	9 May 1987 (aged 34)	Right	Right-arm off-spin	Khulna Tigers
90	Mustafizur Rahman	6 September 1995 (aged 26)	Left	Left-arm medium-fast	Rangpur Rangers
59	Soumya Sarkar	25 February 1993 (aged 28)	Right	Right-arm medium-fast	Cumilla Warriors
Withdrawn players
7	Aminul Islam^{1} ^{2}	6 November 1999 (aged 21)	Right	Right-arm leg break	Khulna Tigers
74	Mohammad Saifuddin^{3}	1 November 1996 (aged 24)	Left	Right-arm fast-medium	Rajshahi Royals
75	Shakib Al Hasan^{4}	24 April 1987 (aged 34)	Left	Slow left-arm orthodox	Rangpur Rangers

^{1}Rubel Hossain and Aminul Islam were named as travelling reserves.

^{2}On 10 October 2021, Aminul Islam withdrew himself from the squad and returned home.

^{3}On 26 October 2021, Mohammad Saifuddin was ruled out of the tournament due to a back injury, with Rubel Hossain named as his replacement.

^{4}Shakib Al Hasan was ruled out of Bangladesh's final two Super 12 matches due to a hamstring injury.

== England ==
England announced their squad on 9 September 2021.

Coach: (England) Chris Silverwood

No.	Player	Date of birth	Batting	Bowling style	Domestic team
16	Eoin Morgan (c)	10 September 1986 (aged 35)	Left	Right-arm medium	Middlesex
63	Jos Buttler (vc, wk)	8 September 1990 (aged 31)	Right	–	Lancashire Lightning
18	Moeen Ali	18 June 1987 (aged 34)	Left	Right-arm off-spin	Worcestershire Rapids
51	Jonny Bairstow (wk)	26 September 1989 (aged 32)	Right	–	Yorkshire Vikings
7	Sam Billings (wk)	15 June 1991 (aged 30)	Right	–	Kent Spitfires
59	Tom Curran^{1}	12 March 1995 (aged 26)	Right	Right-arm fast-medium	Surrey
34	Chris Jordan	4 October 1988 (aged 33)	Right	Right-arm fast-medium	Sussex Sharks
23	Liam Livingstone	4 August 1993 (aged 28)	Right	Right-arm leg break	Lancashire Lightning
29	Dawid Malan	3 September 1987 (aged 34)	Left	Right-arm leg break	Yorkshire Vikings
95	Adil Rashid	17 February 1988 (aged 33)	Right	Right-arm leg break	Yorkshire Vikings
38	Reece Topley^{2}	21 February 1994 (aged 27)	Right	Left-arm medium-fast	Surrey
14	James Vince^{3}	14 March 1991 (aged 30)	Right	Right-arm medium	Hampshire Hawks
15	David Willey	28 February 1990 (aged 31)	Left	Left-arm fast-medium	Yorkshire Vikings
19	Chris Woakes	2 March 1989 (aged 32)	Right	Right-arm fast-medium	Birmingham Bears
33	Mark Wood	11 January 1990 (aged 31)	Right	Right-arm fast	Durham
Reserve players
83	Liam Dawson	1 March 1990 (aged 31)	Right	Slow left-arm orthodox	Hampshire Hawks
Withdrawn players
58	Sam Curran^{1}	3 June 1998 (aged 23)	Left	Left-arm medium-fast	Surrey
72	Tymal Mills^{2}	12 August 1992 (aged 29)	Right	Left-arm fast	Sussex Sharks
20	Jason Roy^{3}	21 July 1990 (aged 31)	Right	Right-arm medium	Surrey

^{1}On 5 October 2021, Sam Curran was ruled out of England's squad due to a back injury. His brother, Tom Curran, was named as his replacement.

^{2}On 3 November 2021, Tymal Mills was ruled out of the rest of the tournament due to thigh strain, with Reece Topley, one of the reserves, named as his replacement.

^{3}Jason Roy suffered a calf injury during England's Super 12 match against South Africa, ruling him out of the rest of the tournament, with James Vince, one of the reserve players, named as his replacement.

== India ==
India announced their squad on 8 September 2021.

Coach: (India) Ravi Shastri

No.	Player	Date of birth	Batting	Bowling style	Domestic team
18	Virat Kohli (c)	5 November 1988 (aged 32)	Right	Right-arm medium	Royal Challengers Bangalore
45	Rohit Sharma (vc)	30 April 1987 (aged 34)	Right	Right-arm off-spin	Mumbai Indians
99	Ravichandran Ashwin	17 September 1986 (aged 35)	Right	Right-arm off-spin	Delhi Capitals
93	Jasprit Bumrah	6 December 1993 (aged 27)	Right	Right-arm fast-medium	Mumbai Indians
28	Rahul Chahar	4 August 1999 (aged 22)	Right	Right-arm leg break	Mumbai Indians
29	Varun Chakravarthy	29 August 1991 (aged 30)	Right	Right-arm leg break	Kolkata Knight Riders
8	Ravindra Jadeja	6 December 1988 (aged 32)	Left	Slow left-arm orthodox	Chennai Super Kings
32	Ishan Kishan (wk)	18 July 1998 (aged 23)	Left	–	Mumbai Indians
15	Bhuvneshwar Kumar	5 February 1990 (aged 31)	Right	Right-arm medium-fast	Sunrisers Hyderabad
17	Rishabh Pant (wk)	4 October 1997 (aged 24)	Left	–	Delhi Capitals
1	KL Rahul	18 April 1992 (aged 29)	Right	Right-arm medium	Punjab Kings
33	Hardik Pandya	11 October 1993 (aged 28)	Right	Right-arm medium-fast	Mumbai Indians
11	Mohammed Shami	3 September 1990 (aged 31)	Right	Right-arm fast	Punjab Kings
54	Shardul Thakur^{1}	16 October 1991 (aged 30)	Right	Right-arm medium-fast	Chennai Super Kings
63	Suryakumar Yadav	14 September 1990 (aged 31)	Right	Right-arm medium	Mumbai Indians
Reserve players
90	Deepak Chahar	7 August 1992 (aged 29)	Right	Right-arm medium	Chennai Super Kings
41	Shreyas Iyer	6 December 1994 (aged 26)	Right	Right-arm leg break	Delhi Capitals
20	Axar Patel^{1}	20 January 1994 (aged 27)	Left	Slow left-arm orthodox	Delhi Capitals

^{1}On 13 October 2021, Shardul Thakur replaced Axar Patel in India's squad, with Axar added to the team's list of standby player.

== Ireland ==
Ireland announced a provisional squad of 18 players on 9 September 2021, which will be reduced to a core squad of 15 players, plus reserves, in early October. On 8 October 2021, the final 15 players were announced.

Coach: (South Africa) Graham Ford

No.	Player	Date of birth	Batting	Bowling style	Domestic team
63	Andrew Balbirnie (c)	28 December 1990 (aged 30)	Right	Right-arm off-spin	Leinster Lightning
32	Mark Adair	27 March 1996 (aged 25)	Right	Right-arm fast	Northern Knights
85	Curtis Campher	20 April 1999 (aged 22)	Right	Right-arm medium-fast	Munster Reds
64	Gareth Delany	28 April 1997 (aged 24)	Right	Right-arm leg break	Munster Reds
50	George Dockrell	22 July 1992 (aged 29)	Right	Slow left-arm orthodox	Leinster Lightning
82	Josh Little	1 November 1999 (aged 21)	Right	Left-arm fast	Leinster Lightning
35	Andy McBrine	30 April 1993 (aged 28)	Left	Right-arm off-spin	North West Warriors
22	Kevin O'Brien	4 March 1984 (aged 37)	Right	Right-arm medium-fast	Leinster Lightning
5	Neil Rock (wk)	24 September 2000 (aged 21)	Left	–	Northern Knights
21	Simi Singh	4 February 1987 (aged 34)	Right	Right-arm off-spin	Leinster Lightning
1	Paul Stirling	3 September 1990 (aged 31)	Right	Right-arm off-spin	Northern Knights
13	Harry Tector	6 December 1999 (aged 21)	Right	Right-arm off-spin	Northern Knights
3	Lorcan Tucker (wk)	10 September 1996 (aged 25)	Right	–	Leinster Lightning
86	Ben White	29 August 1998 (aged 23)	Right	Right-arm leg break	Northern Knights
44	Craig Young	4 April 1990 (aged 31)	Right	Right-arm fast-medium	North West Warriors
Reserve players
58	Shane Getkate	2 October 1991 (aged 30)	Right	Right-arm medium-fast	North West Warriors
9	Graham Kennedy	24 August 1999 (aged 22)	Left	Slow left-arm orthodox	North West Warriors
60	Barry McCarthy	13 September 1992 (aged 29)	Right	Right-arm fast-medium	Leinster Lightning

== Namibia ==
Namibia announced their squad on 10 September 2021.

Coach: (South Africa) Pierre de Bruyn

No.	Player	Date of birth	Batting	Bowling style	Domestic team
7	Gerhard Erasmus (c)	11 April 1995 (aged 26)	Right	Right-arm leg break
12	JJ Smit (vc)	10 November 1995 (aged 25)	Right	Left-arm medium-fast
11	Stephan Baard	29 April 1992 (aged 29)	Right	Right-arm medium-fast
55	Karl Birkenstock	27 March 1996 (aged 25)	Left	Right-arm fast-medium
–	Michiel du Preez (wk)	3 January 1996 (aged 25)	Right	Right-arm leg break
49	Jan Frylinck	6 April 1994 (aged 27)	Left	Left-arm medium-fast
48	Zane Green (wk)	11 October 1996 (aged 25)	Left	–
19	Jan Nicol Loftie-Eaton	15 March 2000 (aged 21)	Left	Right-arm medium
01	Bernard Scholtz	10 March 1990 (aged 31)	Right	Slow left-arm orthodox
47	Ben Shikongo	8 May 2000 (aged 21)	Right	Right-arm medium-fast
70	Ruben Trumpelmann	1 February 1998 (aged 23)	Right	Left-arm fast
63	Michael van Lingen	24 October 1997 (aged 23)	Left	Left-arm medium
96	David Wiese	18 May 1985 (aged 36)	Right	Right-arm fast-medium
46	Craig Williams	25 February 1984 (aged 37)	Right	Right-arm medium
23	Pikky Ya France	23 April 1990 (aged 31)	Right	Right-arm off-spin
Reserve players
–	Mauritius Ngupita	13 December 2000 (aged 20)	–	–

== Netherlands ==
The Netherlands announced their squad on 10 September 2021.

Coach: (Australia) Ryan Campbell

No.	Player	Date of birth	Batting	Bowling style	Domestic team
8	Pieter Seelaar (c)	2 July 1987 (aged 34)	Right	Slow left-arm orthodox	VOC Rotterdam
48	Colin Ackermann (vc)	4 April 1991 (aged 30)	Right	Right-arm off-spin	–
61	Philippe Boissevain	18 October 2000 (aged 20)	Right	Leg-break googly	VCC
32	Ben Cooper	10 February 1992 (aged 29)	Left	Right-arm medium	VRA Amsterdam
35	Scott Edwards (wk)	23 August 1996 (aged 25)	Right		VOC Rotterdam
20	Brandon Glover	3 April 1997 (aged 24)	Right	Right-arm fast	–
12	Fred Klaassen	13 November 1992 (aged 28)	Right	Left-arm medium-fast	–
5	Bas de Leede	15 November 1999 (aged 21)	Right	Right-arm medium	VCC
97	Stephan Myburgh	28 February 1984 (aged 37)	Left	Right-arm off-spin	Punjab CCR
4	Max O'Dowd	4 March 1994 (aged 27)	Right	Right-arm off-spin	VOC Rotterdam
27	Ryan ten Doeschate	30 June 1980 (aged 41)	Right	Right-arm medium-fast	–
17	Logan van Beek	25 February 1991 (aged 30)	Right	Right-arm medium-fast	VCC
10	Timm van der Gugten	7 September 1990 (aged 31)	Right	Right-arm medium-fast	–
52	Roelof van der Merwe	31 December 1984 (aged 36)	Right	Slow left-arm orthodox	–
47	Paul van Meekeren	15 January 1993 (aged 28)	Right	Right-arm fast	–
Reserve players
21	Tobias Visee	21 January 1991 (aged 30)	Right	–	–
24	Shane Snater	24 March 1996 (aged 25)	Right	Right-arm medium	–

== New Zealand ==
New Zealand announced their squad on 10 August 2021.

Coach: (New Zealand) Gary Stead

No.	Player	Date of birth	Batting	Bowling style	Domestic team
22	Kane Williamson (c)	8 August 1990 (aged 31)	Right	Right-arm off-spin	Northern Knights
38	Tim Southee (vc)	11 December 1988 (aged 32)	Right	Right-arm fast-medium	Northern Knights
60	Todd Astle	24 September 1986 (aged 35)	Right	Right-arm leg break	Canterbury Kings
18	Trent Boult	22 July 1989 (aged 32)	Right	Left-arm fast-medium	Northern Knights
80	Mark Chapman	27 June 1994 (aged 27)	Left	Slow left-arm orthodox	Auckland Aces
31	Martin Guptill	30 September 1986 (aged 35)	Right	Right-arm off-spin	Auckland Aces
12	Kyle Jamieson	30 December 1994 (aged 26)	Right	Right-arm fast-medium	Auckland Aces
20	Adam Milne^{1}	13 April 1992 (aged 29)	Right	Right-arm fast	Central Stags
75	Daryl Mitchell	20 May 1991 (aged 30)	Right	Right-arm medium	Canterbury Kings
50	James Neesham	17 September 1990 (aged 31)	Left	Right-arm medium-fast	Wellington Firebirds
23	Glenn Phillips	6 December 1996 (aged 24)	Right	Right-arm off-spin	Auckland Aces
43	Tim Seifert (wk)	14 December 1994 (aged 26)	Right	—	Northern Knights
74	Mitchell Santner	5 February 1992 (aged 29)	Left	Slow left-arm orthodox	Northern Knights
61	Ish Sodhi	31 October 1992 (aged 28)	Right	Right-arm leg break	Northern Knights
Withdrawn players
69	Lockie Ferguson^{1}	13 June 1991 (aged 30)	Right	Right-arm fast	Auckland Aces
88	Devon Conway (wk)^{2}	8 July 1991 (aged 30)	Left	Right-arm medium	Wellington Firebirds

^{1}Adam Milne was named as injury cover, and replaced Lockie Ferguson in New Zealand's squad, after Ferguson suffered a calf tear.

^{2}Devon Conway was ruled out of New Zealand's squad for the final of the tournament after breaking his hand during the semi-final match against England.

== Oman ==
Oman announced their squad on 8 September 2021.

Coach: (Sri Lanka) Duleep Mendis

No.	Player	Date of birth	Batting	Bowling style	Domestic team
12	Zeeshan Maqsood (c)	24 October 1987 (aged 33)	Left	Slow left-arm orthodox	IT Works
47	Aqib Ilyas (vc)	5 September 1992 (aged 29)	Right	Right-arm off-spin
68	Khawar Ali	20 December 1985 (aged 35)	Right	Right-arm leg break	IT Works
1	Fayyaz Butt	17 August 1993 (aged 28)	Right	Right-arm fast-medium	Arm Alpha
25	Nestor Dhamba	19 February 1990 (aged 31)	Right	Right-arm off-spin	IT Works
26	Sandeep Goud	8 November 1991 (aged 29)	Right	Right-arm medium	Muscat CT
22	Kaleemullah	24 December 1990 (aged 30)	Right	Right-arm medium	Arm Alpha
30	Ayaan Khan	30 August 1992 (aged 29)	Left	Slow left-arm orthodox	Muscat CT
18	Bilal Khan	10 April 1988 (aged 33)	Left	Left-arm medium-fast	Arm Alpha
7	Suraj Kumar (wk)	29 November 1988 (aged 32)	Right	–	Al Turki MNC
86	Naseem Khushi	11 August 1982 (aged 39)	Right	–	Muscat CT
21	Sufyan Mehmood	21 October 1991 (aged 29)	Left	Right-arm medium	Renaissance
99	Mohammad Nadeem	4 September 1982 (aged 39)	Right	Right-arm medium-fast	IT Works
75	Khurram Nawaz	30 January 1986 (aged 35)	Right	–
10	Jatinder Singh	5 March 1989 (aged 32)	Right	Right-arm off-spin	Muscat CT

== Pakistan ==
Pakistan announced their squad on 6 September 2021.

Coach: (Pakistan) Saqlain Mushtaq

No.	Player	Date of birth	Batting	Bowling style	Domestic team
56	Babar Azam (c)	15 October 1994 (aged 27)	Right	Right-arm off-spin	Central Punjab
7	Shadab Khan (vc)	4 October 1998 (aged 23)	Right	Right-arm leg break	Northern
54	Sarfaraz Ahmed (wk)^{1}	22 May 1987 (aged 34)	Right	Right-arm off spin	Sindh
10	Shaheen Afridi	6 April 2000 (aged 21)	Left	Left-arm fast	Khyber Pakhtunkhwa
45	Asif Ali	1 October 1991 (aged 30)	Right	Right-arm medium-fast	Northern
32	Hasan Ali	7 February 1994 (aged 27)	Right	Right-arm fast-medium	Central Punjab
46	Haider Ali^{2}	2 October 2000 (aged 20)	Right	Right-arm medium	Northern
8	Mohammad Hafeez	17 October 1980 (aged 41)	Right	Right-arm off-spin	Khyber Pakhtunkhwa
18	Shoaib Malik^{4}	1 February 1982 (aged 39)	Right	Right-arm off-spin	Central Punjab
21	Mohammad Nawaz	21 March 1994 (aged 27)	Left	Slow left-arm orthodox	Northern
97	Haris Rauf	7 November 1993 (aged 27)	Right	Right-arm fast	Northern
16	Mohammad Rizwan (wk)	1 June 1992 (aged 29)	Right	Right-arm medium	Khyber Pakhtunkhwa
9	Imad Wasim	18 December 1988 (aged 32)	Left	Slow left-arm orthodox	Northern
74	Mohammad Wasim Jr	25 August 2001 (aged 20)	Right	Right-arm medium	Khyber Pakhtunkhwa
39	Fakhar Zaman^{3}	4 October 1990 (aged 31)	Left	Slow left-arm orthodox	Khyber Pakhtunkhwa
Reserve players
91	Usman Qadir	10 August 1993 (aged 28)	Left	Right-arm leg break	Central Punjab
28	Shahnawaz Dahani	5 August 1998 (aged 23)	Right	Right-arm fast-medium	Sindh
72	Khushdil Shah^{3}	7 February 1995 (aged 26)	Left	Left-arm off break	Southern Punjab
Removed players
77	Azam Khan^{1}	10 August 1998 (aged 23)	Right	-	Southern Punjab
87	Mohammad Hasnain^{2}	5 April 2000 (aged 21)	Right	Right-arm fast	Sindh
Withdrawn players
92	Sohaib Maqsood^{4}	15 April 1987 (aged 34)	Right	Right-arm off-spin	Southern Punjab

^{1} ^{2}On 8 October 2021, Pakistan updated their squad, with Sarfaraz Ahmed and Haider Ali replacing Azam Khan and Mohammad Hasnain.

^{3}Fakhar Zaman was also moved from the reserve list to the full team in place of Khushdil Shah.

^{4}The following day, Sohaib Maqsood was ruled out of Pakistan's squad due to a back injury, with Shoaib Malik named as his replacement.

== Papua New Guinea ==
Papua New Guinea announced their squad on 24 August 2021.

Coach: (Italy) Carl Sandri

No.	Player	Date of birth	Batting	Bowling style	Domestic team
13	Assad Vala (c)	5 August 1987 (aged 34)	Left	Right-arm off-spin	ODG Electrical Mariners
92	Charles Amini	14 April 1998 (aged 23)	Left	Right-arm leg break	Hastings Deering Black Bass
31	Simon Atai (wk)	19 September 1999 (aged 22)	Left	–	ODG Electrical Mariners
34	Sese Bau	23 June 1992 (aged 29)	Left	Right-arm medium	Toyota Cassowaries
45	Kiplin Doriga (wk)	18 October 1995 (aged 25)	Left	–	Hastings Deering Black Bass
14	Jack Gardner		–	Right-arm medium-fast	–
44	Hiri Hiri	1 May 1995 (aged 26)	Right	Right-arm off-break	TrakPro MudMen
7	Jason Kila	15 January 1990 (aged 31)	Left	Slow left-arm orthodox	TrakPro MudMen
16	Kabua Morea	30 September 1993 (aged 28)	Right	Left-arm medium-fast	TrakPro MudMen
43	Nosaina Pokana	21 April 1996 (aged 25)	Left	Left-arm fast	Toyota Cassowaries
53	Damien Ravu	3 May 1994 (aged 27)	Right	Right-arm medium-fast	Hastings Deering Black Bass
6	Lega Siaka	21 December 1992 (aged 28)	Right	Right-arm leg break	TrakPro MudMen
77	Chad Soper	19 November 1991 (aged 29)	Right	Right-arm medium-fast	–
46	Gaudi Toka	17 June 1994 (aged 27)	Left	Right-arm medium-fast	TrakPro MudMen
4	Tony Ura	15 October 1989 (aged 32)	Right	–	Toyota Cassowaries
2	Norman Vanua	2 December 1993 (aged 27)	Right	Right-arm medium	TrakPro MudMen

== Scotland ==
Scotland announced a provisional squad of 17 players on 9 September 2021, which was reduced to 15 players and two reserves on 10 October 2021.

Coach: (South Africa) Shane Burger

No.	Player	Date of birth	Batting	Bowling style	Domestic team
15	Kyle Coetzer (c)	14 April 1984 (aged 37)	Right	Right-arm medium-fast
44	Richie Berrington (vc)	3 April 1987 (aged 34)	Right	Right-arm medium-fast
17	Dylan Budge	11 September 1995 (aged 26)	Right	Right-arm medium
9	Matthew Cross (wk)	15 October 1992 (aged 29)	Right	–
45	Alasdair Evans	12 January 1989 (aged 32)	Right	Right-arm fast-medium
13	Chris Greaves	12 October 1990 (aged 31)	Right	Right-arm leg break
49	Michael Jones^{1}	5 January 1998 (aged 23)	Right	Right-arm off-spin
29	Michael Leask	29 October 1990 (aged 30)	Right	Right-arm off-spin
10	Calum MacLeod	15 November 1988 (aged 32)	Right	Right-arm fast-medium
93	George Munsey	21 February 1993 (aged 28)	Left	Right-arm medium-fast
50	Safyaan Sharif	24 May 1991 (aged 30)	Right	Right-arm fast-medium
32	Hamza Tahir	9 November 1995 (aged 25)	Right	Slow left-arm orthodox
18	Craig Wallace (wk)	27 June 1990 (aged 31)	Right	–
51	Mark Watt	29 July 1996 (aged 25)	Left	Slow left-arm orthodox
58	Brad Wheal	28 August 1996 (aged 25)	Right	Right-arm fast
Reserve players
71	Chris Sole	27 February 1994 (aged 28)	Right	Right-arm medium-fast
Withdrawn players
38	Josh Davey^{1}	3 August 1990 (aged 31)	Right	Right-arm medium-fast

^{1}Josh Davey was ruled out of Scotland's squad for their final three matches due to a groin injury. Michael Jones who was initially in the reserves list was named as his replacement.

== South Africa ==
South Africa announced their squad on 9 September 2021.

Coach: (South Africa) Mark Boucher

No.	Player	Date of birth	Batting	Bowling style	Domestic team
11	Temba Bavuma (c)	17 May 1990 (aged 31)	Right	Right-arm medium	Lions
12	Quinton de Kock (wk)	17 December 1992 (aged 28)	Left	Slow left-arm orthodox	Titans
77	Bjorn Fortuin	21 October 1994 (aged 26)	Right	Slow left-arm orthodox	Lions
17	Reeza Hendricks	14 August 1989 (aged 32)	Right	Right-arm fast-medium	Lions
45	Heinrich Klaasen (wk)	30 July 1991 (aged 30)	Right	Right-arm off-spin	Titans
16	Keshav Maharaj	7 February 1990 (aged 31)	Right	Slow left-arm orthodox	Dolphins
4	Aiden Markram	4 October 1994 (aged 27)	Right	Right-arm off-spin	Titans
10	David Miller	10 June 1989 (aged 32)	Left	Right-arm off-spin	Dolphins
13	Wiaan Mulder	19 February 1998 (aged 23)	Right	Right-arm medium	Lions
22	Lungi Ngidi	29 March 1996 (aged 25)	Right	Right-arm fast	Titans
20	Anrich Nortje	16 November 1993 (aged 27)	Right	Right-arm fast	Warriors
29	Dwaine Pretorius	29 March 1989 (aged 32)	Right	Right-arm medium-fast	Lions
25	Kagiso Rabada	25 May 1995 (aged 26)	Right	Right-arm fast	Lions
26	Tabraiz Shamsi	18 February 1990 (aged 31)	Right	Left-arm unorthodox	Titans
72	Rassie van der Dussen	7 February 1989 (aged 32)	Right	Right-arm leg break	Lions
Reserve players
27	George Linde	4 December 1991 (aged 29)	Left	Slow left-arm orthodox	Cape Cobras
23	Andile Phehlukwayo	3 March 1996 (aged 25)	Left	Right-arm fast-medium	Dolphins
6	Lizaad Williams	1 October 1993 (aged 28)	Left	Right-arm medium-fast	Titans

== Sri Lanka ==
Sri Lanka announced their squad on 12 September 2021.

Coach: (South Africa) Mickey Arthur

No.	Player	Date of birth	Batting	Bowling style	Domestic team
7	Dasun Shanaka (c)	9 September 1991 (aged 30)	Right	Right-arm medium	Dambulla Giants
75	Dhananjaya de Silva (vc)	6 September 1991 (aged 30)	Right	Right-arm off-spin	Jaffna Stallions
72	Charith Asalanka	29 June 1997 (aged 24)	Left	Right-arm off-spin	Jaffna Stallions
36	Dinesh Chandimal (wk)	18 November 1989 (aged 31)	Right	Right-arm off-spin	Colombo Kings
5	Dushmantha Chameera	11 January 1992 (aged 29)	Right	Right-arm fast	Colombo Kings
4	Akila Dananjaya^{1} ^{4}	4 October 1993 (aged 28)	Left	Right-arm off-spin	Galle Gladiators
28	Avishka Fernando	5 April 1998 (aged 23)	Right	Right-arm medium-fast	Jaffna Stallions
71	Binura Fernando^{1} ^{4}	12 July 1995 (aged 26)	Right	Left-arm medium-fast	Jaffna Stallions
49	Wanindu Hasaranga	29 July 1997 (aged 24)	Right	Right-arm leg break	Jaffna Stallions
29	Chamika Karunaratne	29 May 1996 (aged 25)	Right	Right-arm medium-fast
8	Lahiru Kumara^{1} ^{4}	13 February 1997 (aged 24)	Left	Right-arm fast-medium	Dambulla Giants
18	Pathum Nissanka^{2} ^{4}	18 May 1998 (aged 23)	Right	–
55	Kusal Perera (wk)	17 August 1990 (aged 31)	Left	Right-arm medium	Kandy Tuskers
54	Bhanuka Rajapaksa	24 October 1991 (aged 29)	Right	Right-arm fast	Galle Gladiators
61	Maheesh Theekshana	1 August 2000 (aged 21)	Right	Right-arm off-spin	Jaffna Stallions
Reserve players
88	Pulina Tharanga^{1}	23 January 1993 (aged 28)	Right	-	Galle Gladiators
10	Ashen Bandara^{2}	23 November 1998 (aged 22)	Right	Right-arm leg break	Jaffna Stallions
85	Lakshan Sandakan^{2}	10 June 1991 (aged 29)	Right	Left-arm leg break	Colombo Kings
25	Ramesh Mendis^{2}	7 June 1995 (aged 26)	Right	Right-arm off spin	Dambulla Giants
99	Shiran Fernando^{5}	4 May 1993 (aged 28)	Right	Right-arm medium-fast
Removed players
21	Kamindu Mendis^{4}	30 September 1998 (aged 23)	Left	Ambidextrous off spin	Kandy Warriors
63	Nuwan Pradeep^{4}	19 October 1986 (aged 34)	Right	Right-arm fast-medium	Dambulla Giants
12	Praveen Jayawickrama^{4}	30 September 1998 (aged 23)	Right	Left-arm off spin	Jaffna Stallions
15	Minod Bhanuka^{2} ^{3} ^{4}	29 April 1995 (aged 26)	Left	-	Jaffna Stallions
Withdrawn players
45	Lahiru Madushanka^{3}	12 September 1992 (aged 29)	Right	Right-arm fast-medium	Dambulla Giants

^{1}Akila Dananjaya, Binura Fernando, Lahiru Kumara and Pulina Tharanga were named as reserve players.

^{2}On 1 October 2021, Sri Lanka added Pathum Nissanka, Minod Bhanuka, Ashen Bandara, Lakshan Sandakan and Ramesh Mendis to their squad.

^{3}Lahiru Madushanka was ruled out of Sri Lanka's squad due to a fractured collarbone, with Minod Bhanuka named as his replacement.

^{4}Sri Lanka announced their final squad for the tournament on 10 October 2021. Kamindu Mendis, Nuwan Pradeep, Praveen Jayawickrama, and Minod Bhanuka were removed from the squad. Akila Dananjaya, Lahiru Kumara, Binura Fernando, and Pathum Nissanka were added to the squad.

^{5}On 16 October 2021, Shiran Fernando was also added to Sri Lanka's squad as a reserve player.

== West Indies ==
The West Indies announced their squad on 9 September 2021.

Coach: (Cricket West Indies) Phil Simmons

No.	Player	Date of birth	Batting	Bowling style	Domestic team
55	Kieron Pollard (c)	12 May 1987 (aged 34)	Right	Right-arm medium	Trinbago Knight Riders
29	Nicholas Pooran (vc, wk)	2 October 1995 (aged 26)	Left	Right-arm off-spin	Guyana Amazon Warriors
47	Dwayne Bravo	7 October 1983 (aged 38)	Right	Right-arm medium-fast	St Kitts & Nevis Patriots
10	Roston Chase	22 March 1992 (aged 29)	Right	Right-arm off-spin	Saint Lucia Kings
72	Andre Fletcher (wk)	28 November 1987 (aged 33)	Right	Right-arm medium-fast	Saint Lucia Kings
45	Chris Gayle	21 September 1979 (aged 42)	Left	Right-arm off-spin	St Kitts & Nevis Patriots
2	Shimron Hetmyer	26 December 1996 (aged 24)	Left	—	Guyana Amazon Warriors
21	Akeal Hosein^{1}	25 April 1993 (aged 28)	Left	Slow left-arm orthodox	Trinbago Knight Riders
17	Evin Lewis	27 December 1991 (aged 29)	Left	Right-arm medium	St Kitts & Nevis Patriots
98	Jason Holder^{2}	4 January 1991 (aged 30)	Right	Right-arm fast-medium	Barbados Royals
14	Ravi Rampaul	15 October 1984 (aged 37)	Left	Right-arm fast-medium	Trinbago Knight Riders
12	Andre Russell	29 April 1988 (aged 33)	Right	Right-arm fast	Jamaica Tallawahs
54	Lendl Simmons	25 January 1985 (aged 36)	Right	Right-arm medium-fast	Trinbago Knight Riders
42	Oshane Thomas	18 February 1997 (aged 24)	Left	Right-arm fast	Barbados Royals
86	Hayden Walsh Jr.	23 April 1992 (aged 29)	Left	Right-arm leg break	Barbados Royals
Reserve players
19	Sheldon Cottrell	19 August 1989 (aged 32)	Right	Left-arm fast-medium	St Kitts & Nevis Patriots
46	Darren Bravo	6 February 1989 (aged 32)	Left	Right-arm medium	Trinbago Knight Riders
Withdrawn players
97	Fabian Allen^{1}	7 May 1995 (aged 26)	Right	Slow left-arm orthodox	St Kitts & Nevis Patriots
61	Obed McCoy^{2}	4 January 1997 (aged 24)	Left	Left-arm fast-medium	Saint Lucia Kings

^{1}On 20 October 2021, Akeal Hosein, one of the reserve players, replaced Fabian Allen, after Allen was ruled out with an ankle injury.

^{2}On 27 October 2021, Jason Holder, one of the reserve players, replaced Obed McCoy, after McCoy was ruled out due to an injury.
