= Afghan cricket team in Ireland in 2019 =

International cricket tour

	Ireland	Afghanistan
- Dates: 19 – 21 May 2019
Captains	William Porterfield	Gulbadin Naib

One Day International series
- Results: 2-match series drawn 1–1
Most runs	Paul Stirling (121)	Mohammad Shahzad (103)
Most wickets	Mark Adair (7)	Gulbadin Naib (7)
- Player of the series: Paul Stirling (Ire)

The Afghanistan cricket team toured Ireland in May 2019 to play two One Day International (ODI) matches. Both matches were played at the Stormont Cricket Ground in Belfast. The ODI fixtures were part of Afghanistan's preparation for the 2019 Cricket World Cup. In April 2019, the Afghanistan Cricket Board (ACB) named Gulbadin Naib as the team's new ODI captain, replacing Asghar Afghan. The series was drawn 1–1, with Ireland winning the first match and Afghanistan winning the second.

== Squads ==
ODIs
Ireland	Afghanistan
William Porterfield (c); Mark Adair; Andrew Balbirnie; George Dockrell; Tyrone Kane; Andrew McBrine; Barry McCarthy; James McCollum; Tim Murtagh; Kevin O'Brien; Boyd Rankin; Paul Stirling; Lorcan Tucker; Gary Wilson	Gulbadin Naib (c); Asghar Afghan; Aftab Alam; Hamid Hassan; Rashid Khan; Mohammad Nabi; Mujeeb Ur Rahman; Rahmat Shah; Hashmatullah Shahidi; Mohammad Shahzad (wk); Samiullah Shinwari; Dawlat Zadran; Najibullah Zadran; Noor Ali Zadran; Hazratullah Zazai

== ODI series ==
=== 1st ODI ===
19 May 2019
10:45
Scorecard

Ireland; 210 (48.5 overs)	v	Afghanistan; 138 (35.4 overs)
Paul Stirling 71 (94); Aftab Alam 3/28 (7.5 overs)		Asghar Afghan 29 (51); Mark Adair 4/19 (6.4 overs)

Ireland won by 72 runs
Stormont Cricket Ground, Belfast
Umpires: Shaun George (SA) and Alan Neill (Ire)

- Afghanistan won the toss and elected to field.
- Boyd Rankin (Ire) took his 100th wicket in ODIs.

=== 2nd ODI ===
21 May 2019
10:45
Scorecard

Afghanistan; 305/7 (50 overs)	v	Ireland; 179 (41.2 overs)
Mohammad Shahzad 101 (88); Mark Adair 3/71 (10 overs)		Paul Stirling 50 (56); Gulbadin Naib 6/43 (9.2 overs)

Afghanistan won by 126 runs
Stormont Cricket Ground, Belfast
Umpires: Shaun George (SA) and Mark Hawthorne (Ire)

- Ireland won the toss and elected to field.
- Gulbadin Naib took his first five-wicket haul and the third-best figures by a bowler for Afghanistan in ODIs.
