= 2026 Inter-Provincial Trophy =

Cricket tournament

- Dates: 2 June – 29 July 2026
- Administrator: Cricket Ireland
- Cricket format: Twenty20
- Tournament format: Triple round-robin
- Host: Ireland
- Champions: Leinster Lightning (10th title)
- Participants: 3
- Matches: 9
- Most runs: Andrew Balbirnie (205)
- Most wickets: Jai Moondra (10)

The 2026 Inter-Provincial Trophy was the fourteenth edition of the Inter-Provincial Trophy, a Twenty20 cricket competition in Ireland and was the tenth edition of the competition played with full Twenty20 status.

Three provincial teams took part in the tournament. In March 2026, Cricket Ireland confirmed the fixtures for the competition. Leinster Lightning are still the defending champions after the final match was abandoned due to rain.

The tournament began on 2 June and the final match was scheduled to be played on 17 June 2026.

On 10 June 2026, Cricket Ireland announced that the round of fixtures scheduled for 10-11 June in Lisburn were postponed due to ongoing rioting across Northern Ireland. The following week, it was announced that the fixtures were rescheduled to 28-29 July.

== Teams and standings ==
=== Points table ===
| Pos | Team | Pld | W | L | NR | Pts | NRR |
|---|---|---|---|---|---|---|---|
| 1 | Leinster Lightning | 6 | 4 | 0 | 2 | 22 | 2.524 |
| 2 | North West Warriors | 6 | 2 | 3 | 1 | 11 | −0.385 |
| 3 | Northern Knights | 6 | 0 | 3 | 3 | 6 | −2.190 |

Source: Cricinfo

Champions

=== Points summary ===
| Team | Group matches | | | | | |
| Team | 1 | 2 | 3 | 4 | 5 | 6 |
|---|---|---|---|---|---|---|
| Leinster Lightning | 4 | 6 | 11 | 15 | 20 | 22 |
| Northern Knights | 2 | 4 | 4 | 4 | 4 | 6 |
| North West Warriors | 0 | 2 | 7 | 7 | 11 | 11 |

| Win | Loss | Tie | No result | Eliminated |

- Note: The total points at the end of each group match are listed.
- Note: Click on the points or results to see the match summary.

== Fixtures ==
Match 1
2 June 2026
15:30
Scorecard

| Leinster Lightning; 179/9 (16 overs) | v | North West Warriors; 159/6 (16 overs) |
| George Dockrell 57 (20); Craig Young 3/37 (3 overs) | | Gavin Roulston 57 (31); Jai Moondra 3/31 (4 overs) |

Leinster Lightning won by 20 runs
Bready Cricket Club Ground, Bready
Umpires: Roland Black and George Brolly
Player of the match: George Dockrell (Leinster Lightning)

- North West Warriors won the toss and elected to field.
- The match was reduced to 16 overs per side due to rain.
- Points: Leinster Lightning 4, North West Warriors 0.

Match 2
3 June 2026
10:45
Scorecard

| Northern Knights; 16/0 (1.2 overs) | v | Leinster Lightning |
| Ross Adair 11* (5) |

No result
Bready Cricket Club Ground, Bready
Umpires: George Brolly and Warren McCully

- Leinster Lightning won the toss and elected to field.
- No further play was possible due to rain.
- Points: Northern Knights 2, Leinster Lightning 2.

Match 3
3 June 2026
15:30
Scorecard

| North West Warriors | v | Northern Knights |

Match abandoned
Bready Cricket Club Ground, Bready
Umpires: George Brolly and Warren McCully

- No toss.
- No play was possible due to rain.
- Points: Northern Knights 2, North West Warriors 2.

Match 4
28 July 2026
15:30
Scorecard

| North West Warriors; 214/5 (20 overs) | v | Northern Knights; 198 (19.5 overs) |
| Gareth Delany 55* (20); Shane Dadswell 1/9 (2 overs) | | Morgan Topping 83 (49); Gareth Delany 3/29 (4 overs) |

North West Warriors won by 16 runs
Wallace Park, Lisburn
Umpires: Mark Hawthorne and Jareth McCready
Player of the match: Gareth Delany (North West Warriors)

- North West Warriors won the toss and elected to bat.
- The match was rescheduled to 28 July 2026 due to rioting.
- Points: North West Warriors 4, Northern Knights 0.

Match 5
29 July 2026
10:45
Scorecard

| North West Warriors; 176/4 (18 overs) | v | Leinster Lightning; 129/2 (9.4 overs) |
| Andrew Balbirnie 102* (61); Jai Moondra 3/39 (4 overs) | | Harry Tector 59* (29); Trent McKeegan 1/18 (3 overs) |

Leinster Lightning won by 40 runs (DLS method)
Wallace Park, Lisburn
Umpires: Azam Baig and Warren McCully

- Leinster Lightning won the toss and elected to field.
- The match was reduced to 18 overs per side due to rain.
- Leinster Lightning were 40 runs ahead of the DLS par score of 90 runs off 9.4 overs due to rain.
- Alastair Doherty (North West Warriors) made his T20 debut.
- The match was rescheduled to 29 July 2026 due to rioting.
- Points: Leinster Lightning 5, North West Warriors 0.

Match 6
29 July 2026
15:30
Scorecard

| Northern Knights | v | Leinster Lightning |

Match abandoned
Wallace Park, Lisburn

- No toss.
- No play was possible due to rain.
- The match was rescheduled to 29 July 2026 due to rioting.
- Points: Leinster Lightning 2, Northern Knights 2.

Match 7
16 June 2026
15:30
Scorecard

| Northern Knights; 152/9 (20 overs) | v | Leinster Lightning; 153/2 (13.3 overs) |
| James McCollum 24 (28); Matt Hollard 3/35 (4 overs) | | Lorcan Tucker 58* (24); Reuben Wilson 1/25 (2.3 overs) |

Leinster Lightning won by 8 wickets
Sydney Parade, Dublin
Umpires: Aidan Seaver and Kashif Sumra
Player of the match: Tim Tector (Leinster Lightning)

- Leinster Lightning won the toss and elected to field.
- Charles Swart (Northern Knights) made his T20 debut.
- Points: Leinster Lightning 5, Northern Knights 0.

Match 8
17 June 2026
10:45
Scorecard

| North West Warriors; 204/6 (20 overs) | v | Northern Knights; 159 (17.1 overs) |
| Gareth Delany 56 (27); Adam Leckey 3/47 (4 overs) | | Kian Hilton 43* (25); Scott MacBeth 3/17 (3.1 overs) |

North West Warriors won by 45 runs
Sydney Parade, Dublin
Umpires: Azam Baig and Aidan Seaver
Player of the match: Scott MacBeth (North West Warriors)

- Northern Knights won the toss and elected to field.
- Hassan Shahid (North West Warriors) made his T20 debut.
- Points: North West Warriors 5, Northern Knights 0.

Match 9
17 June 2026
15:30
Scorecard

| Leinster Lightning; 183 (19.3 overs) | v | North West Warriors; 149 (18.1 overs) |
| Lorcan Tucker 56 (26); Trent McKeegan 3/28 (3.3 overs) | | Gareth Delany 31 (24); Gavin Hoey 3/26 (4 overs) |

Leinster Lightning won by 34 runs
Sydney Parade, Dublin
Umpires: Aidan Seaver (Ire) and Kashif Sumra (Eng)
Player of the match: Lorcan Tucker (Leinster Lightning)

- North West Warriors won the toss and elected to field.
- Points: Leinster Lightning 4, North West Warriors 0.
