= 2017 Inter-Provincial Cup =

Cricket tournament

- Dates: 1 May 2017 – 10 September 2017
- Administrator: Cricket Ireland
- Cricket format: List A
- Tournament format: Round-robin
- Champions: Leinster Lightning
- Participants: 3
- Matches: 6
- Most runs: Ed Joyce (188)
- Most wickets: George Dockrell (10)

The 2017 Inter-Provincial Cup was the fifth edition of the Inter-Provincial Cup, a List A cricket competition played in Ireland. It was held from 1 May to 10 September 2017. It was the first edition of the competition to be played with List A status, following the outcome of a meeting by the International Cricket Council (ICC) in October 2016. Three teams competed; Leinster Lightning, North West Warriors and Northern Knights, with Leinster Lightning being the defending champions. Leinster Lightning retained their title, after North West Warriors won their match against Northern Knights on 6 August, giving Leinster Lightning an unassailable lead in the competition.

== Points table ==
The following teams competed:

Team	Pld	W	L	T	NR	Pts
Leinster Lightning	4	3	0	0	1	15
North West Warriors	4	1	2	0	1	6
Northern Knights	4	0	2	0	2	4

Champions

== Fixtures ==
=== 1st match ===
1 May 2017
Scorecard

Leinster Lightning (H); 286 (49.2 overs)	v	North West Warriors; 181 (44.2 overs)
Kevin O'Brien 75 (49); Craig Young 4/50 (9.2 overs)		Irosh Samarasooriya 77 (95); George Dockrell 3/37 (9.2 overs)

Leinster Lightning won by 105 runs
The Vineyard, Dublin
Umpires: Azam Baig and Graeme McCrea

- Leinster Lightning won the toss and elected to bat.
- Jamie Grassi, Tyrone Kane, Simi Singh (Leinster Lightning), Rickie-Lee Dougherty, Steve Vijay Lazars, Gary McClintock, David Rankin and Johnny Thompson (North West Warriors) all made their List A debuts.
- Points: Leinster Lightning 5, North West Warriors 0.

=== 2nd match ===
29 May 2017
Scorecard

Northern Knights; 84/2 (14.3 overs)	v	North West Warriors (H)
James Shannon 26* (20); David Scanlon 1/19 (3 overs)

No result
New Strabane Park, Strabane
Umpires: Jonathan Kennedy and Graeme McCrea

- North West Warriors won the toss and elected to field.
- Rain reduced the match to 41 overs per side.
- More rain during Northern Knights' innings prevented any further play.
- Ross Allen, Aaron Gillespie, David Scanlon (North West Warriors); Adam Dennison, Shane Getkate, Robert McKinley, Nathan Smith and Nikolai Smith (Northern Knights) all made their List A debuts.
- Points: North West Warriors 2, Northern Knights 2.

=== 3rd match ===
4 June 2017
Scorecard

Leinster Lightning; 299/8 (50 overs)	v	Northern Knights (H)
Ed Joyce 116 (124); Shane Getkate 5/44 (10 overs)

No result
The Meadow, Downpatrick
Umpires: Philip Thompson and Sum Wijesundera

- Leinster Lightning won the toss and elected to bat.
- Rain during the innings break prevented any further play.
- Bobby Gamble, Jack Tector, Lorcan Tucker (Leinster Lightning) and Morgan Topping (Northern Knights) all made their List A debuts.
- Points: Northern Knights 2, Leinster Lightning 2.

=== 4th match ===
2 July 2017
Scorecard

Leinster Lightning; 232 (50 overs)	v	North West Warriors (H); 205 (47.2 overs)
Kevin O'Brien 58* (58); Ross Allen 3/52 (10 overs)		Stuart Thompson 50 (73); George Dockrell 4/38 (9.2 overs)

Leinster Lightning won by 27 runs
Bready Cricket Club Ground, Bready
Umpires: Azam Baig and Graeme McCrea

- Leinster Lightning won the toss and elected to bat.
- David Barr and William McClintock (North West Warriors) both made their List A debuts.
- Points: Leinster Lightning 4, North West Warriors 0.

=== 5th match ===
6 August 2017
Scorecard

Northern Knights (H); 167 (29.1 overs)	v	North West Warriors; 168/9 (30 overs)
Christopher Dougherty 41 (41); Ross Allen 3/9 (2.1 overs)		Johnny Thompson 51 (52); Nathan Smith 3/14 (6 overs)

North West Warriors won by 1 wicket
The Lawn, Waringstown
Umpires: Roland Black and Michael Ross

- Northern Knights won the toss and elected to bat.
- Rain reduced the match to 30 overs per side.
- James McCollum and Lee Nelson (Northern Knights) both made their List A debuts.
- Points: North West Warriors 4, Northern Knights 0.

=== 6th match ===
10 September 2017
Scorecard

Leinster Lightning (H); 239/8 (48 overs)	v	Northern Knights; 132 (24.5 overs)
George Dockrell 50* (35); Gary Kidd 3/31 (10 overs)		Robert McKinley 27* (27); George Dockrell 3/18 (5 overs)

Leinster Lightning won by 55 (D/L method)
Observatory Lane, Dublin
Umpires: Michael Foster and Sum Wijesundera

- Northern Knights won the toss and elected to field.
- Rain set Northern Knights a revised target of 188 runs from 25 overs.
- David Delany and Gareth Delany (Leinster Lightning) both made their List A debuts.
- Points: Leinster Lightning 4, Northern Knights 0.
