= Scottish cricket team in Ireland in 2015 =

| | Ireland | Scotland |
- Dates: 18 June 2015 – 21 June 2015
| Captains | Kevin O'Brien | Preston Mommsen |

Twenty20 International series
- Results: Scotland won the 4-match series 2–0
| Most runs | Kevin O'Brien (66) | Matthew Cross (108) |
| Most wickets | Tyrone Kane (4) | Safyaan Sharif (4) |
- Player of the series: Matthew Cross (Sco)

The Scottish cricket team toured Ireland from 18 to 21 June 2015 to play four Twenty20 International (T20I) matches. Scotland won the four-match series 2–0, with two games declared no-results due to rain. Originally planned as a three-match series, an extra game was added to the schedule after the second match was abandoned without a ball being bowled due to rain. The tour was a warm-up for the 2015 ICC World Twenty20 Qualifier which took place in Ireland the following month.

== Squads ==
| Ireland | Scotland |
|---|---|
| Kevin O'Brien (c); John Anderson; Andrew Balbirnie; Alex Cusack; George Dockrell; Tyrone Kane; Andrew McBrine; Graeme McCarter; ~~John Mooney~~; Andrew Poynter; Stuart Poynter; David Rankin; Max Sorensen; ~~Paul Stirling~~; Stuart Thompson; Craig Young | Preston Mommsen (c); Richie Berrington; Freddie Coleman; Matthew Cross; Josh Davey; Con de Lange; Alasdair Evans; Michael Leask; Gavin Main; George Munsey; Safyaan Sharif; Craig Wallace; Mark Watt |

On 16 June Ireland's Paul Stirling and John Mooney were removed from the squad. Stirling was required for matches with Middlesex and Mooney pulled out due to family commitments. They were replaced by David Rankin and John Anderson.

== T20I series ==
=== 1st T20I ===
18 June 2015
17:30 (D/N)
Scorecard

| Ireland; 146/5 (20 overs) | v | Scotland; 150/4 (16.1 overs) |
| David Rankin 34 (37); Michael Leask 2/23 (4 overs) | | Matthew Cross 60 (33); Tyrone Kane 3/27 (3.1 overs) |

Scotland won by 6 wickets
Bready Cricket Club Ground, Magheramason
Umpires: Mark Hawthorne (Ire) and Nigel Llong (Eng)

- Ireland won the toss and elected to bat.
- John Anderson, Tyrone Kane, Graeme McCarter, Stuart Poynter, David Rankin, Craig Young (Ire) and Alasdair Evans, George Munsey and Mark Watt (Sco) all made their T20I debuts.

=== 2nd T20I ===
19 June 2015
17:30 (D/N)
Scorecard

| Ireland | v | Scotland |

No result
Bready Cricket Club Ground, Magheramason
Umpires: Mark Hawthorne (Ire) and Nigel Llong (Eng)

- Scotland won the toss and elected to field.
- Rain prevented any play from taking place.
- Andrew Balbirnie (Ire), Con de Lange and Gavin Main (both Sco) made their T20I debuts.

=== 3rd T20I ===
20 June 2015
15:30
Scorecard

| Ireland; 166/6 (20 overs) | v | Scotland; 167/4 (18.1 overs) |
| Andrew Poynter 36 (24); Safyaan Sharif 2/26 (4 overs) | | Matthew Cross 48 (30); George Dockrell 3/21 (4 overs) |

Scotland won by 6 wickets
Bready Cricket Club Ground, Magheramason
Umpires: Mark Hawthorne (Ire) and Nigel Llong (Eng)

- Scotland won the toss and elected to field.

=== 4th T20I ===
21 June 2015
14:00
Scorecard

| Scotland | v | Ireland |

No result
Bready Cricket Club Ground, Magheramason
Umpires: Mark Hawthorne (Ire) and Nigel Llong (Eng)

- Ireland won the toss and elected to field.
- Rain prevented any play from taking place.
