= Afghan cricket team in Ireland in 2016 =

International cricket tour

	Ireland	Afghanistan
- Dates: 10 July 2016 – 19 July 2016
Captains	William Porterfield	Asghar Stanikzai

One Day International series
- Results: 5-match series drawn 2–2
Most runs	Ed Joyce (339)	Mohammad Shahzad (176)
Most wickets	Kevin O'Brien (10); Barry McCarthy (10)	Rashid Khan (7)
- Player of the series: Ed Joyce (Ire)

The Afghanistan cricket team toured Ireland in July 2016 to play five One Day Internationals (ODIs) matches at Stormont, Belfast. It was the first time Ireland played a five-match ODI series. The series was drawn 2–2, with the first match being abandoned due to rain.

== Squads ==
ODIs
Ireland	Afghanistan
William Porterfield (c); Mark Adair; John Anderson; Peter Chase; Ed Joyce; Tyrone Kane; Andrew McBrine; Barry McCarthy; Tim Murtagh; Kevin O'Brien; Stuart Poynter; Paul Stirling; Sean Terry; Gary Wilson	Asghar Stanikzai (c); Javed Ahmadi; Yamin Ahmadzai; Mirwais Ashraf; Amir Hamza; Hameed Hassan; Rashid Khan; Mohammad Nabi; Gulbadin Naib; Rahmat Shah; Mohammad Shahzad; Samiullah Shinwari; Dawlat Zadran; Najibullah Zadran; Noor Ali Zadran; Shapoor Zadran

Nasir Jamal, Imran Janat and Afsar Zazai were named as reserve players for Afghanistan.

== ODI series ==
=== 1st ODI ===
10 July 2016
Scorecard

Ireland	v	Afghanistan

Match abandoned
Stormont Cricket Ground, Belfast
Umpires: Roland Black (Ire) and Ian Ramage (Sco)

- No toss.
- Rain prevented any play and the match was abandoned without a ball bowled.

=== 2nd ODI ===
12 July 2016
Scorecard

Afghanistan; 250 (49.2 overs)	v	Ireland; 211 (48.2 overs)
Mohammad Shahzad 66 (79); Kevin O'Brien 4/45 (10 overs)		Ed Joyce 62 (87); Rashid Khan 3/28 (10 overs)

Afghanistan won by 39 runs
Stormont Cricket Ground, Belfast
Umpires: Alan Neill (Ire) and Ian Ramage (Sco)

- Ireland won the toss and elected to field.

=== 3rd ODI ===
14 July 2016
Scorecard

Afghanistan; 236 (49.1 overs)	v	Ireland; 237/4 (47.3 overs)
Mohammad Shahzad 81 (95); Kevin O'Brien 3/28 (9.1 overs)		Ed Joyce 105* (135); Hameed Hassan 2/21 (6 overs)

Ireland won by 6 wickets
Stormont Cricket Ground, Belfast
Umpires: Roland Black (Ire) and Ian Ramage (Sco)

- Afghanistan won the toss and elected to bat.
- Sean Terry (Ire) made his ODI debut.

=== 4th ODI ===
17 July 2016
Scorecard

Afghanistan; 229/7 (50 overs)	v	Ireland; 150 (41 overs)
Rashid Khan 60* (44); Andy McBrine 2/29 (10 overs)		Kevin O'Brien 34 (49); Rashid Khan 4/21 (8 overs)

Afghanistan won by 79 runs
Stormont Cricket Ground, Belfast
Umpires: Alan Neill (Ire) and Chettithody Shamshuddin (Ind)

- Afghanistan won the toss and elected to bat.

=== 5th ODI ===
19 July 2016
Scorecard

Ireland; 265/5 (50 overs)	v	Afghanistan; 253/9 (50 overs)
Ed Joyce 160* (148); Dawlat Zadran 2/49 (10 overs)		Najibullah Zadran 54 (66); Kevin O'Brien 3/57 (10 overs)

Ireland won by 12 runs
Stormont Cricket Ground, Belfast
Umpires: Roland Black (Ire) and Chettithody Shamshuddin (Ind)

- Afghanistan won the toss and elected to field.
- Kevin O'Brien (Ire) played in his 100th ODI.
- Ed Joyce (Ire) made his highest score and the second-highest for any Ireland batsman in an ODI.
- Ed Joyce made 60.37% of Ireland's runs, the highest percentage for an Associate side in a completed ODI innings.
