= Jonathan Robinson (Irish cricketer) =

Irish cricketer (born 1982)

Personal information
- Born: 9 November 1982 (age 44); Derry, Northern Ireland
- Batting: Right-handed
- Bowling: Right-arm off break

Domestic team information
- Years: Team
- 2016–2017: North West Warriors
- T20 debut: 26 May 2017 North West Warriors v Leinster Lightning

Career statistics
Competition	Twenty20
Matches	3
Runs scored	6
Batting average	6.00
100s/50s	0/0
Top score	6
Balls bowled	30
Wickets	1
Bowling average	34.00
5 wickets in innings	0
10 wickets in match	0
Best bowling	1/20
Catches/stumpings	0/–
- Source: ESPNcricinfo, 22 July 2017

Jonathan Robinson (born 9 November 1982) is an Irish cricketer. He made his Twenty20 cricket debut for North West Warriors in the 2017 Inter-Provincial Trophy on 26 May 2017.
