= Jamie Grassi =

Irish cricketer

Personal information
- Full name: Jamie Brian Grassi
- Born: 9 October 1998 (age 28); Dublin, Ireland
- Batting: Right-handed
- Role: Wicket-keeper

International information
- National side: Italy
- T20I debut (cap 19): 15 October 2021 v Denmark
- Last T20I: 21 October 2021 v Germany

Domestic team information
- Years: Team
- 2016–2017: Leinster Lightning
- 2017–2018: Munster Reds
- Since 2021: Leinster Lightning

Career statistics
Competition	T20I	LA	T20
Matches	6	6	19
Runs scored	58	158	151
Batting average	14.50	31.60	10.06
100s/50s	0/0	0/1	0/0
Top score	20	82	21
Catches/stumpings	2/–	1/0	8/6
- Source: ESPNcricinfo, 3 February 2023

Jamie Brian Grassi (born 9 October 1998) is an Irish cricketer who represents the Italy national cricket team. Grassi's father is Italian, and he qualified to play for Italy in 2021, after his three-year exclusion period had expired.

Grassi made his List A debut for Leinster Lightning in the 2017 Inter-Provincial Cup on 1 May 2017. He made his Twenty20 cricket debut for Munster Reds in the 2017 Inter-Provincial Trophy on 26 May 2017. In December 2017, he was named in Ireland's squad for the 2018 Under-19 Cricket World Cup.

In September 2021, he was named in Italy's Twenty20 International (T20I) squad for the Regional Final of the 2021 ICC Men's T20 World Cup Europe Qualifier tournament. He made his T20I debut on 15 October 2021, for Italy against Denmark.
