= Nathan Smith (Irish cricketer) =

Irish cricketer

Personal information
- Full name: Nathan Bede Smith
- Born: 9 July 1995 (age 31); Sandringham, Victoria, Australia

Domestic team information
- Years: Team
- 2016–2018: Northern Knights
- FC debut: 30 May 2017 Northern v North West
- LA debut: 29 May 2017 Northern v North West

Career statistics
Competition	FC	LA	T20
Matches	6	6	3
Runs scored	55	19	8
Batting average	9.16	4.75	8.00
100s/50s	0/0	0/0	0/0
Top score	22*	9	6
Balls bowled	732	222	48
Wickets	9	6	3
Bowling average	40.55	30.00	17.33
5 wickets in innings	0	0	0
10 wickets in match	0	0	0
Best bowling	4/34	3/14	2/22
Catches/stumpings	1/–	0/–	2/–
- Source: Cricinfo, 27 July 2019

Nathan Bede Smith (born 9 July 1995) is an Australian-born Irish former cricketer. He represented the Northern Knights team in the Inter-Provincial Championship, Ireland's first class competition. Smith was predominantly a bowler. In March 2019, Smith announced that he would no longer be available to be selected by Cricket Ireland, as he focused on opportunities in Australia.

== Career ==
Smith made his List A debut for Northern Knights in the 2017 Inter-Provincial Cup on 29 May 2017. He made his first-class debut for Northern Knights in the 2017 Inter-Provincial Championship on 30 May 2017. He made his Twenty20 cricket debut for Northern Knights in the 2017 Inter-Provincial Trophy on 9 June 2017.

In May 2018, Smith was named in a fourteen-man squad for Ireland's first ever Test match, to be played against Pakistan later the same month. However, ahead of the match he suffered an injury, ruling him out of the fixture, and was replaced in the squad by Craig Young.
