= Ross Allen (Irish cricketer) =

Irish cricketer (born 1996)

Personal information
- Born: 21 June 1996 (age 30)
- Batting: Left-handed
- Bowling: Slow left-arm orthodox

Domestic team information
- Years: Team
- 2014–present: North West Warriors
- FC debut: 30 May 2017 North West v Northern
- LA debut: 29 May 2017 North West v Northern

Career statistics
Competition	FC	LA	T20
Matches	10	13	11
Runs scored	289	37	25
Batting average	22.23	6.16	8.33
100s/50s	0/1	0/0	0/0
Top score	81	9	12*
Balls bowled	294	247	66
Wickets	3	12	1
Bowling average	49.33	17.58	71.00
5 wickets in innings	0	0	0
10 wickets in match	0	0	0
Best bowling	1/9	3/9	1/14
Catches/stumpings	3/–	4/–	4/–
- Source: Cricinfo, 6 May 2021

Ross Allen (born 21 June 1996) is an Irish cricketer. He made his List A debut for North West Warriors in the 2017 Inter-Provincial Cup on 29 May 2017. He made his first-class debut for North West Warriors in the 2017 Inter-Provincial Championship on 30 May 2017. He made his Twenty20 debut for North West Warriors in the 2017 Inter-Provincial Trophy on 23 June 2017.

In June 2019, he was named in the Ireland Wolves squad for their home series against the Scotland A cricket team.
