= Robert McKinley (cricketer) =

Irish cricketer (born 1993)

Personal information
- Full name: George Kenneth Robert McKinley
- Born: 3 November 1993 (age 33); Larne, Northern Ireland
- Batting: Right-handed
- Bowling: Right-arm medium

Domestic team information
- Years: Team
- 2014–present: Northern Knights
- 2015: Loughborough MCCU
- FC debut: 2 April 2015 Loughborough MCCU v Hampshire
- LA debut: 29 May 2017 Northern v North West

Career statistics
Competition	FC	LA	T20
Matches	5	3	3
Runs scored	130	27	2
Batting average	21.66	–	2.00
100s/50s	0/0	0/0	0/0
Top score	43*	27*	2
Balls bowled	462	102	48
Wickets	9	2	3
Bowling average	42.22	42.00	15.00
5 wickets in innings	0	0	0
10 wickets in match	0	0	0
Best bowling	3/67	1/27	3/18
Catches/stumpings	1/–	0/–	2/–
- Source: CricketArchive, 6 October 2017

George Kenneth Robert McKinley (born 3 November 1993) is a cricketer from Larne, Northern Ireland, who has played at Larne Grammar School, Larne town and Ballymena, then at first-class level for Loughborough MCC University. He debuted for them during the 2015 English season, having earlier played for the Ireland national under-19 side.

He made his List A debut for Northern Knights in the 2017 Inter-Provincial Cup on 29 May 2017. He made his Twenty20 debut for Northern Knights in the 2017 Inter-Provincial Trophy on 16 June 2017.
