= Oraine Williams =

Jamaican cricketer (born 1992)

Personal information
- Full name: Oraine Williams
- Born: 13 July 1992 (age 34)

Domestic team information
- Years: Team
- 2017-present: Jamaica

Career statistics
Competition	FC	List A
Matches	10	4
Runs scored	216	36
Batting average	11.36	9.00
100s/50s	0/1	0/0
Top score	56	15
Balls bowled	16	-
Wickets	0	-
Bowling average	-	-
5 wickets in innings	0	-
10 wickets in match	0	-
Best bowling	0/5	-/-
Catches/stumpings	12/0	0/0
- Source: Cricinfo, 9 October 2021

Oraine Williams (born 13 July 1992) is a Jamaican cricketer. He made his first-class debut for Jamaica in the 2016–17 Regional Four Day Competition on 7 April 2017. In June 2021, he was selected to take part in the Minor League Cricket tournament in the United States following the players' draft.
