= Rickie-Lee Dougherty =

Irish cricketer (born 1991)

Personal information
- Full name: Rickie-Lee Dougherty
- Born: 6 March 1991 (age 35)
- Batting: Left-handed
- Role: Wicket-keeper

Domestic team information
- Years: Team
- 2013–present: North West Warriors
- Only First-class: 30 May 2017 North West v Northern
- List A debut: 1 May 2017 North West v Leinster

Career statistics
Competition	FC	LA	T20
Matches	1	4	8
Runs scored	1	46	46
Batting average	1.00	23.00	23.00
100s/50s	0/0	0/0	0/0
Top score	1	24	24*
Catches/stumpings	6/0	2/1	11/1
- Source: ESPNcricinfo, 12 June 2018

Rickie-Lee Dougherty (born 6 March 1991) is an Irish cricketer. He made his List A debut for North West Warriors in the 2017 Inter-Provincial Cup on 1 May 2017. He made his Twenty20 cricket debut for North West Warriors in the 2017 Inter-Provincial Trophy on 26 May 2017. He made his first-class debut for North West Warriors in the 2017 Inter-Provincial Championship on 30 May 2017.
