= Nikolai Smith =

Italian cricketer

Personal information
- Full name: Nikolai Leonard Smith
- Born: 5 January 1993 (age 33); Cape Town, Cape Province, South Africa
- Batting: Right-handed
- Bowling: Right-arm medium

International information
- National side: Italy (2019–present)
- T20I debut (cap 20): 15 October 2021 v Denmark
- Last T20I: 21 October 2021 v Germany

Domestic team information
- Years: Team
- 2013–2018: Northern Knights

Career statistics
Competition	T20I	FC	LA	T20
Matches	6	5	16	11
Runs scored	90	67	343	116
Batting average	22.50	8.37	31.18	12.88
100s/50s	0/0	0/0	1/0	0/0
Top score	26	28	102*	26
Balls bowled	–	353	126	50
Wickets	–	8	6	3
Bowling average	–	17.50	20.00	26.33
5 wickets in innings	–	0	0	0
10 wickets in match	–	0	0	0
Best bowling	–	2/25	4/44	2/23
Catches/stumpings	3/–	1/–	6/–	4/–
- Source: Cricinfo, 3 February 2023

Nikolai Leonard Smith (born 5 January 1993) is an Italian cricketer who plays for the Italy national cricket team. He qualifies as an Italian citizen through his mother, who comes from Ottaviano.

He made his Twenty20 cricket debut for Northern Knights in the 2017 Inter-Provincial Trophy on 26 May 2017. He made his List A debut for Northern Knights in the 2017 Inter-Provincial Cup on 29 May 2017. He made his first-class debut for Northern Knights in the 2017 Inter-Provincial Championship on 30 May 2017.

In November 2019, he was named in Italy's squad for the Cricket World Cup Challenge League B tournament in Oman. In Italy's opening match of the tournament, against Kenya, Smith scored his first century in List A cricket.

In September 2021, he was named in Italy's Twenty20 International (T20I) squad for the Regional Final of the 2021 ICC Men's T20 World Cup Europe Qualifier tournament. He made his T20I debut on 15 October 2021, for Italy against Denmark.
