= John Anderson (Irish cricketer) =

Irish cricketer

Personal information
- Full name: John Anderson
- Born: 6 October 1982 (age 44); Durban, Natal Province, South Africa
- Batting: Right-handed
- Bowling: Right-arm offbreak
- Role: Batsman
- Relatives: Isobel Joyce (wife)

International information
- National side: Ireland (2014-2017)
- ODI debut (cap 43): 8 September 2014 v Scotland
- Last ODI: 27 September 2016 v Australia
- T20I debut (cap 29): 18 June 2015 v Scotland
- Last T20I: 21 June 2015 v Scotland

Domestic team information
- Years: Team
- 2002: KwaZulu-Natal
- 2013–2018: Leinster Lightning

Career statistics
Competition	ODI	T20I	FC	LA
Matches	8	4	19	24
Runs scored	151	12	933	516
Batting average	18.87	6.00	35.88	22.43
100s/50s	0/0	0/0	2/7	0/1
Top score	39	9	127	75
Balls bowled	30	6	565	60
Wickets	0	0	7	0
Bowling average	–	–	48.14	–
5 wickets in innings	–	–	0	–
10 wickets in match	–	–	0	–
Best bowling	–	–	2/92	–
Catches/stumpings	3/–	0/–	7/–	7/–
- Source: ESPNcricinfo, 3 October 2018

John Anderson (born 6 October 1982) is a South African-born Irish former cricketer. Anderson is a right-handed opening batsman who bowls right-arm off spin.

== Early career (2002–2013) ==
Anderson made his first-class debut for KwaZulu-Natal against Griqualand West in October 2002. Anderson later moved to Ireland, where he played for Merrion Cricket Club. In 2012 Anderson was included in an Ireland A squad for a tour of England in April and May. He played three matches: a one-day match against Marylebone Cricket Club and two three-day matches against Kent 2nd XI and Gloucestershire 2nd XI. He was retained in the Ireland A team for a series against the touring South Africa A cricket team in August and September. He played four matches, including two first-class matches and two List A matches, making his List A debut on 19 August.

== International career (2013–2018) ==
=== 2011–13 ICC Intercontinental Cup (2013) ===
Anderson made his Ireland debut in the 2011–13 ICC Intercontinental Cup against the Netherlands in July 2013, and scored his maiden first-class century (127) in a 279-run Irish victory. He played Ireland's last three matches for the tournament against Scotland and Afghanistan. He scored a half-century against Scotland in an innings victory, and Ireland progressed to the final against Afghanistan. He top-scored in the first innings with another half-century, scoring 55 while Ireland were bowled out for a paltry 187 runs. He only scored 2 runs in the second innings but Ireland went on to win the match by 122 runs regardless. Due to his performances in international cricket Anderson won Cricket Ireland's Aengus Fanning International Player of the Year award for 2013.

=== Limited overs matches (2014–2016) ===
In July 2014 Anderson made his way into Ireland's limited overs side for a series of unofficial One Day Internationals against Sri Lanka A. He kept his place in the side and made his One Day International debut against Scotland in September. He played all three matches of the ODI series but was unimpressive, only scoring 40 runs combined.

He made his Twenty20 International debut against Scotland on 18 June 2015. After the 2015 season he was included in Ireland's Emerging Players Programme for 2015/16 to train over the winter. He was in Ireland's squad for their ODI series against Afghanistan in 2016, but he was struck on the head while batting in the second match and showed symptoms of concussion, forcing him out of the next match.

=== Return to Intercontinental Cup (2016) ===
Anderson impressed in domestic cricket in 2016 with strong performances for Leinster Lightning in the 2016 Inter-Provincial Championship. Across the four matches he scored 342 runs at an average of 85.50 with a high score of 135 not out. As a result, he returned to Ireland's Intercontinental Cup side for the first time since the 2013 final to play in Ireland's home match against Hong Kong. He played again in March 2017 and, though Ireland suffered an innings defeat to Afghanistan, he scored another half-century (61), having reached 50 in all of his first five Intercontinental Cup matches.

=== Retirement ===
In October 2018, he retired from international cricket. The following month, he was named the Male Club Player of the Year at the annual Cricket Ireland Awards.
