= Jacob Mulder =

Irish cricketer (born 1995)

Personal information
- Full name: Jacob Mulder
- Born: 11 August 1995 (age 31); Perth, Western Australia
- Batting: Right-handed
- Bowling: Right-arm leg break

International information
- National side: Ireland (2016–2019)
- ODI debut (cap 51): 4 March 2017 v UAE
- Last ODI: 24 March 2017 v Afghanistan
- ODI shirt no.: 12
- T20I debut (cap 37): 5 September 2016 v Hong Kong
- Last T20I: 12 March 2017 v Afghanistan
- T20I shirt no.: 12

Domestic team information
- Years: Team
- 2015–2020: Northern Knights

Career statistics
Competition	ODI	T20I	FC	LA
Matches	4	8	4	18
Runs scored	15	6	87	122
Batting average	–	3.00	21.75	15.25
100s/50s	0/0	0/0	0/0	0/0
Top score	15*	5*	38*	28
Balls bowled	186	174	584	639
Wickets	5	12	5	19
Bowling average	31.00	16.00	60.00	29.15
5 wickets in innings	0	0	0	0
10 wickets in match	0	0	0	0
Best bowling	3/57	4/16	2/33	3/5
Catches/stumpings	1/–	2/–	1/–	5/–
- Source: CricketArchive, 12 October 2019

Jacob Mulder (born 11, August 1995) is an Australian-born Irish cricketer. He made his Twenty20 International (T20I) debut against Hong Kong on 5 September 2016. He made his One Day International (ODI) debut against the United Arab Emirates on 4, March 2017. He made his first-class debut for Northern Knights in the 2017 Inter-Provincial Championship on 1 August 2017. In 2020, he finished his career playing in Ireland, before returning to Australia.
