= Kenny Carroll =

Irish cricketer

Personal information
- Full name: Kenneth Edward Desmond Carroll
- Born: 22 March 1983 (age 43); Booterstown, Ireland
- Batting: Right-handed
- Bowling: Right-arm leg break
- Role: Batsman

International information
- National side: Ireland
- ODI debut (cap 15): 31 January 2007 v Bermuda
- Last ODI: 11 July 2007 v Netherlands
- ODI shirt no.: 26

Domestic team information
- Years: Team
- 2014–2016: Leinster Lightning

Career statistics
Competition	ODI	List A
Matches	6	10
Runs scored	70	131
Batting average	11.66	13.10
100s/50s	0/0	0/0
Top score	28	28
Balls bowled	6	12
Wickets	0	0
Bowling average	–	–
5 wickets in innings	–	–
10 wickets in match	–	–
Best bowling	–	–
Catches/stumpings	4/–	4/–
- Source: ESPNcricinfo, 3 May 2017

Kenneth Edward Desmond Carroll (born 22 March 1983) is an Irish cricketer. He was born at Booterstown, Dublin, educated at Oatlands College, Stillorgan, and currently works for the Irish postal service, An Post. He is a right-handed batsman and a right-arm leg break bowler. He currently plays for Railway Union and has represented the Southern XI, Ireland U-23, Ireland A and made his debut for the senior team in 2006.

The Dublin-born player has played in the 2006 European Championships having represented Ireland's Under-23 team in the same tournament earlier in the year, winning the award for Player of the Tournament. He also played in the 2006 EurAsia Cricket Series, but Ireland's A team finished bottom of their group in the competition. Carroll made his World Cup debut against Sri Lanka in Ireland's last 'Super 8's match and also opened the batting against India and South Africa in the recent Future Cup in Belfast.

Carroll has also played for the Ireland men's national field hockey team, winning several caps. He is currently part of the A training squad. Carroll also captained his club side, Railway Union, to a Neville Cup in 2011 and a first Men's Irish Hockey League qualification ever for the club.
