= Adam Dennison =

Irish cricketer (born 1997)

Personal information
- Full name: Adam Dennison
- Born: 3 May 1997 (age 29)
- Batting: Right-handed

Domestic team information
- Years: Team
- 2014–present: Northern Knights
- First-class debut: 30 May 2017 Northern v North West
- List A debut: 29 May 2017 Northern v North West

Career statistics
Competition	FC	LA	T20
Matches	2	6	9
Runs scored	45	60	176
Batting average	11.25	12.00	22.00
100s/50s	0/0	0/0	0/0
Top score	36	23	35
Catches/stumpings	0/–	2/–	1/–
- Source: Cricinfo, 28 August 2018

Adam Dennison (born 3 May 1997) is an Irish cricketer. He made his Twenty20 cricket debut for Northern Knights in the 2017 Inter-Provincial Trophy on 26 May 2017. Prior to his Twenty20 debut, he was part of Ireland's squad for the 2016 Under-19 Cricket World Cup.

He made his List A debut for Northern Knights in the 2017 Inter-Provincial Cup on 29 May 2017. He made his first-class debut for Northern Knights in the 2017 Inter-Provincial Championship on 30 May 2017.
