= Gary McClintock =

Irish cricketer (born 1997)

Personal information
- Full name: Gary S McClintock
- Born: 1 January 1997 (age 29)
- Batting: Right-handed
- Bowling: Right-arm medium-fast
- Role: All-rounder
- Relatives: William McClintock (brother)

Domestic team information
- Years: Team
- 2014–present: North West Warriors
- Only LA: 1 May 2017 North West v Leinster

Career statistics
Competition	List A
Matches	1
Runs scored	10
Batting average	10.00
100s/50s	0/0
Top score	10
Balls bowled	6
Wickets	0
Bowling average	–
5 wickets in innings	–
10 wickets in match	–
Best bowling	–
Catches/stumpings	1/–
- Source: ESPNricinfo, 1 May 2017

Gary McClintock (born 1 January 1997) is an Irish cricketer. He made his List A debut for North West Warriors in the 2017 Inter-Provincial Cup on 1 May 2017. Prior to his List A debut, he was part of Ireland's squad for the 2016 Under-19 Cricket World Cup.
