= Graeme McCarter =

Irish cricketer

Personal information
- Full name: Graeme John McCarter
- Born: 10 October 1992 (age 34); Derry, Northern Ireland
- Batting: Right-handed
- Bowling: Right-arm medium
- Role: Bowler

International information
- National side: Ireland (2014–2015)
- Only ODI (cap 47): 12 September 2014 v Scotland
- T20I debut (cap 31): 18 June 2015 v Scotland
- Last T20I: 20 June 2015 v Scotland

Domestic team information
- Years: Team
- 2012–2014: Gloucestershire
- 2016–present: Northern Knights

Career statistics
Competition	ODI	T20I	FC	LA
Matches	1	3	14	29
Runs scored	1	–	232	89
Batting average	–	–	16.57	7.41
100s/50s	0/0	–	0/1	0/0
Top score	1*	–	62*	23
Balls bowled	48	30	1,854	1,264
Wickets	0	0	26	36
Bowling average	–	–	39.92	24.91
5 wickets in innings	–	–	0	1
10 wickets in match	–	–	0	0
Best bowling	–	–	4/95	6/32
Catches/stumpings	0/–	0/–	3/–	4/–
- Source: Cricinfo, 17 July 2021

Graeme John McCarter (born 10 October 1992) is an Irish cricketer from Northern Ireland, who represents the Ireland cricket team. He played matches for the national team in 2014 and 2015 before being dropped and reselected to represent them in 2021.

At domestic level, he has played for Gloucestershire County Cricket Club since 2012, having joined the club's academy in 2008. In June 2012, he signed a contract with Gloucestershire till the end of the 2014 season. He made his One Day International debut against Scotland in September 2014. He made his Twenty20 International debut against Scotland on 18 June 2015.

== Career ==
Born in Derry, Graeme McCarter began playing for Ireland at Under-15 level. He also played badminton, and represented Ireland, but chose to pursue cricket instead as he felt he was better at it. McCarter joined Gloucestershire's academy in late 2008, and in November 2010 he signed a two-year contract with the club.

At the same time, McCarter was also recognised as a future prospect for Ireland. The International Cricket Council (ICC) held a Europe Men's Academy in February 2011 for twelve of Europe's best players, and McCarter was one of four Ireland players to attend. In June that year, he was called up to Ireland's senior squad for the first time. However, he had to wait until September to make his first-class debut.

The 2011 Under-19 Cricket World Cup Qualifier was held in July and August; McCarter took 14 wickets as Ireland secured one of the available places at the following year's Under-19 World Cup.

Ireland faced Namibia in the 2011–13 ICC Intercontinental Cup, and in the absence of several first-choice players due to commitments to county cricket McCarter was included in the squad. Ireland won by five wickets and McCarter took a single wicket (that of Pikky Ya France, bowled) in the match while conceding 90 runs (1/90). In February 2012, McCarter was again part of the ICC's Europe Men's Academy. After playing regularly for Gloucestershire's second XI, he made his debut for the first team on 7 May 2012 during a Clydesdale Bank 40 match against Middlesex. He bowled Joe Denly to claim his maiden wicket in one day cricket, and finished with 3/41 as Gloucestershire won a rain-affected match. The same week, McCarter played his maiden County Championship match for the club; the only other first-class match he had played was for Ireland. The match against Yorkshire ended defeat. While McCarter scored 29 not out from 14 balls in his only innings, when he bowled he conceded 67 runs from 19 overs without taking a wicket.

Following the 2013 season, it was announced that McCarter would head to Australia for the winter to play club cricket as well as attending coaching sessions held by former Australian Test match fast bowler, Craig McDermott

He made his One Day International (ODI) debut against Scotland in September 2014.

In May 2021, McCarter was named in Ireland's ODI squad for their series against the Netherlands. This came after McCarter was the leading wicket-taker for the Ireland Wolves tour against the Netherlands A team.
