= Tyrone Kane =

Irish cricketer (born 1994)

Personal information
- Full name: Tyrone Edward Kane
- Born: 8 July 1994 (age 32); Dublin, Ireland
- Batting: Right-handed
- Bowling: Right-arm fast-medium
- Role: Bowler

International information
- National side: Ireland (2015–2023)
- Only Test (cap 4): 11 May 2018 v Pakistan
- T20I debut (cap 30): 18 June 2015 v Scotland
- Last T20I: 14 January 2023 v Zimbabwe

Domestic team information
- Years: Team
- 2013–2020: Leinster Lightning
- 2021–present: Munster Reds

Career statistics
Competition	Test	T20I	FC	LA
Matches	1	9	10	34
Runs scored	14	45	228	645
Batting average	7.00	15.00	25.33	23.88
100s/50s	0/0	0/0	0/1	0/4
Top score	14	26*	75	83
Balls bowled	156	92	1,254	1,258
Wickets	0	9	15	43
Bowling average	–	15.88	40.40	23.79
5 wickets in innings	0	0	0	1
10 wickets in match	0	0	0	0
Best bowling	–	3/19	3/45	6/42
Catches/stumpings	0/–	1/–	2/–	7/–
- Source: Cricinfo, 23 February 2023

Tyrone Edward Kane (born 8 July 1994) is an Irish cricketer who plays for the Ireland national cricket team. He was one of the eleven cricketers to play in Ireland's first ever Test match, against Pakistan, in May 2018. In December 2018, he was one of nineteen players to be awarded a central contract by Cricket Ireland for the 2019 season. In January 2020, he was one of nineteen players to be awarded a central contract from Cricket Ireland, the first year in which all contracts were awarded on a full-time basis.

== Domestic and T20 career ==
He made his List A debut for Leinster Lightning in the 2017 Inter-Provincial Cup on 1 May 2017. He made his first-class debut for Leinster Lightning in the 2017 Inter-Provincial Championship on 30 August 2017.

In July 2019, he was selected to play for the Dublin Chiefs in the inaugural edition of the Euro T20 Slam cricket tournament. However, the following month the tournament was cancelled.

== International career ==
He made his Twenty20 International (T20I) debut against Scotland on 18 June 2015. In June 2016, he was named in Ireland's One Day International (ODI) squad for their series against Afghanistan, that took place the following month, but he did not play.

In May 2018, he was named in a fourteen-man squad for Ireland's first ever Test match, which was played against Pakistan later the same month. He made his Test debut for Ireland, against Pakistan, on 11 May 2018 and was dismissed for a duck.

In May 2019, he was named in Ireland's ODI squad for their series against Afghanistan, but he did not play. The following month, he was named in the Ireland Wolves squad for their home series against the Scotland A cricket team. On 10 July 2020, Kane was named in Ireland's 21-man squad to travel to England to start training behind closed doors for the ODI series against the England cricket team.
