= Shane Getkate =

Irish cricketer

Personal information
- Full name: Shane Charles Getkate
- Born: 2 October 1991 (age 35); Durban, Natal Province, South Africa
- Batting: Right-handed
- Bowling: Right-arm medium-fast
- Role: All-rounder

International information
- National side: Ireland
- ODI debut (cap 58): 1 July 2019 v Zimbabwe
- Last ODI: 13 September 2021 v Zimbabwe
- T20I debut (cap 44): 13 February 2019 v Oman
- Last T20I: 24 February 2022 v UAE

Domestic team information
- Years: Team
- 2014–2020: Northern Knights
- 2021–2024: North West Warriors
- 2022/23: Matabeleland Tuskers

Career statistics
Competition	ODI	T20I	FC	LA
Matches	4	30	11	63
Runs scored	23	275	381	1,300
Batting average	23.00	11.95	23.81	27.08
100s/50s	0/0	0/0	0/2	1/8
Top score	16*	30	70	120
Balls bowled	192	330	726	1,422
Wickets	7	16	13	46
Bowling average	20.71	28.93	35.38	28.50
5 wickets in innings	0	0	0	1
10 wickets in match	0	0	0	0
Best bowling	2/30	3/20	4/62	5/44
Catches/stumpings	1/–	9/–	0/–	15/–
- Source: Cricinfo, 20 February 2026

Shane Charles Getkate (born 2 October 1991) is a South African-born Irish cricketer. Getkate was born with Wolff–Parkinson–White syndrome, which caused him to collapse on field during an under-19 game in June 2011. In January 2020, he was one of nineteen players to be awarded a central contract from Cricket Ireland, the first year in which all contracts were awarded on a full-time basis.

== Domestic and T20 career ==
He made his Twenty20 cricket debut for Northern Knights in the 2017 Inter-Provincial Trophy on 26 May 2017. He made his List A debut for Northern Knights in the 2017 Inter-Provincial Cup on 29 May 2017. He made his first-class debut for Northern Knights in the 2017 Inter-Provincial Championship on 30 May 2017.

In April 2019, he was one of five cricketers to be awarded with an Emerging Player Contract by Cricket Ireland, ahead of the 2019 domestic season. In July 2019, he was selected to play for the Belfast Titans in the inaugural edition of the Euro T20 Slam cricket tournament. However, the following month the tournament was cancelled.

== International career ==
In January 2019, he was named in Ireland's Twenty20 International (T20I) squads for the Oman Quadrangular Series and the series against Afghanistan in India. He made his T20I debut for Ireland against Oman on 13 February 2019, becoming Ireland's 700th international cap.

In June 2019, he was named in the Ireland Wolves squad for their home series against the Scotland A cricket team. Later the same month, he was named in Ireland's squad for their series against Zimbabwe. He made his One Day International (ODI) debut for Ireland against Zimbabwe on 1 July 2019.

In September 2019, he was named in Ireland's squad for the 2019 ICC T20 World Cup Qualifier tournament in the United Arab Emirates. In February 2021, Getkate was named in the Ireland Wolves' squad for their tour to Bangladesh. In September 2021, Getkate was named in Ireland's provisional squad for the 2021 ICC Men's T20 World Cup.
