= Alan Neill =

Cricket umpire

Personal information
- Full name: Alan James Neill
- Born: 10 June 1956 (age 70); Downpatrick, County Down, Northern Ireland
- Role: Umpire

Umpiring information
- ODIs umpired: 10 (2016–2021)
- T20Is umpired: 20 (2016–2021)
- WODIs umpired: 8 (2009–2021)
- WT20Is umpired: 7 (2009–2018)
- Source: Cricinfo, 13 September 2021

Alan James Neill (born 10 June 1956) is a Northern Irish cricket umpire. Neill serves as a member of the ICC Associate and Affiliate Panel of Umpires representing Ireland.

Neill stood in matches during the 2016 ICC World Cricket League Division Five tournament in Jersey in May 2016, including the final between Jersey and Oman. On 12 July 2016, he made his One Day International (ODI) umpiring debut in a match between Ireland and Afghanistan. On 5 September 2016 he stood in his first Twenty20 International match, between Ireland and Hong Kong.

In April 2019, he was one of four umpires to be awarded a full-time season contract by Cricket Ireland, the first time that Cricket Ireland offered such contracts to umpires. Neill had officiated in 10 ODIs and 20 T20Is by September 2021.

== See also ==
- List of One Day International cricket umpires
- List of Twenty20 International cricket umpires
