= James McCollum =

Irish cricketer

Personal information
- Full name: James Alexander McCollum
- Born: 1 August 1995 (age 31); Lisburn, Northern Ireland
- Batting: Right-handed
- Bowling: Right-arm medium
- Role: Opening batsman

International information
- National side: Ireland (2019–2023)
- Test debut (cap 15): 15 March 2019 v Afghanistan
- Last Test: 24 April 2023 v Sri Lanka
- ODI debut (cap 53): 28 February 2019 v Afghanistan
- Last ODI: 26 January 2021 v Afghanistan

Domestic team information
- Years: Team
- 2014–present: Northern Knights
- 2017: Durham MCCU

Career statistics
Competition	Test	ODI	FC	LA
Matches	6	10	28	69
Runs scored	199	188	1,455	1,289
Batting average	18.09	18.80	34.64	20.46
100s/50s	0/0	0/2	3/6	1/6
Top score	39	73	119*	102
Balls bowled	–	–	126	84
Wickets	–	–	5	1
Bowling average	–	–	17.60	48.00
5 wickets in innings	–	–	1	0
10 wickets in match	–	–	0	0
Best bowling	–	–	5/32	1/14
Catches/stumpings	2/–	2/–	5/–	16/–
- Source: Cricinfo, 26 May 2025

James Alexander McCollum (born 1 August 1995) is an Irish cricketer from Northern Ireland. He made his international debut for the Ireland cricket team in February 2019. In January 2020, he was one of nineteen players to be awarded a central contract from Cricket Ireland, the first year in which all contracts were awarded on a full-time basis.

== Domestic career ==
He made his first-class debut on 28 March 2017 for Durham MCCU against Gloucestershire as part of the Marylebone Cricket Club University fixtures. Prior to his first-class debut, he played for Northern Knights in the 2016 Inter-Provincial Championship in Ireland.

He made his Twenty20 debut for Northern Knights in the 2017 Inter-Provincial Trophy on 23 June 2017. He made his List A debut for Northern Knights in the 2017 Inter-Provincial Cup on 6 August 2017. He was the leading run-scorer for Northern Knights in the 2018 Inter-Provincial Championship, with 442 runs in four matches.

== International career ==
In December 2018, he was one of nineteen players to be awarded a central contract by Cricket Ireland for the 2019 season. In January 2019, he was named in Ireland's Test and One Day International (ODI) squads for their series against Afghanistan in India. He made his ODI debut for Ireland against Afghanistan on 28 February 2019. He made his Test debut for Ireland against Afghanistan on 15 March 2019.

In June 2019, he was named in the Ireland Wolves squad for their home series against the Scotland A cricket team. On 10 July 2020, McCollum was named in Ireland's 21-man squad to travel to England to start training behind closed doors for the ODI series against the England cricket team. In February 2021, McCollum was named in the Ireland Wolves' squad for their tour to Bangladesh.

McCollum was named in the Test squad for Ireland's return to the format in their tours to Bangladesh and Sri Lanka in 2023, appearing in all three Tests on the tour. He also appeared in Ireland's Test against England at Lord's in June 2023, and during the second innings, despite retiring hurt with an ankle injury and being on crutches, volunteered to return to the crease to help team-mate Andy McBrine reach his maiden Test century, though he was not ultimately required to do so.
