= Stuart Thompson =

Irish cricketer (born 1991)

Personal information
- Full name: Stuart Robert Thompson
- Born: 15 August 1991 (age 35); Derry, Northern Ireland
- Batting: Left-handed
- Bowling: Right-arm medium-fast
- Role: Bowler
- Relatives: Nigel Thompson (father)

International information
- National side: Ireland (2013-2019)
- Test debut (cap 10): 11 May 2018 v Pakistan
- Last Test: 24 July 2019 v England
- ODI debut (cap 42): 8 September 2013 v Scotland
- Last ODI: 12 May 2017 v Bangladesh
- ODI shirt no.: 17
- T20I debut (cap 27): 19 February 2014 v West Indies
- Last T20I: 1 November 2019 v Netherlands
- T20I shirt no.: 17

Domestic team information
- Years: Team
- 2013–present: North West Warriors

Career statistics
Competition	Test	ODI	T20I	FC
Matches	3	20	41	19
Runs scored	64	228	328	582
Batting average	10.66	16.28	14.90	21.55
100s/50s	0/1	0/0	0/1	1/1
Top score	53	39	56	148
Balls bowled	410	559	474	2,072
Wickets	10	12	18	38
Bowling average	20.40	40.83	37.22	30.39
5 wickets in innings	0	0	0	0
10 wickets in match	0	0	0	0
Best bowling	3/28	2/17	4/18	3/28
Catches/stumpings	0/–	8/–	23/–	7/–
- Source: CricketArchive, 23 April 2020

Stuart Robert Thompson (born 15 August 1991) is an Irish cricketer from Northern Ireland. Thompson is left-handed batsman who bowls right-arm medium-fast. He was one of the eleven cricketers to play in Ireland's first ever Test match, against Pakistan, in May 2018.

In December 2018, he was one of nineteen players to be awarded a central contract by Cricket Ireland for the 2019 season. In January 2020, he was one of nineteen players to be awarded a central contract from Cricket Ireland, the first year in which all contracts were awarded on a full-time basis.

== Career ==
=== Early and domestic ===
Thompson has represented Ireland at U-19 level, playing five Youth One Day International's. In 2012, Thompson was included in the Ireland squad for the 2011–13 ICC Intercontinental Cup match against Afghanistan and made his first-class debut in the match. In August 2012, Thompson was included in the Ireland squad for the 2012 ICC World Twenty20 tournament in Sri Lanka.

In May 2018, he scored his maiden century in first-class cricket, batting for North West Warriors against Leinster Lightning in the 2018 Inter-Provincial Championship. The same month, he was named in a fourteen-man squad for Ireland's first ever Test match, which was played against Pakistan later the same month.

In July 2019, he was selected to play for the Belfast Titans in the inaugural edition of the Euro T20 Slam cricket tournament. However, the following month the tournament was cancelled.

=== International career ===
He made his Test debut for Ireland, against Pakistan, on 11 May 2018. In the first innings, he took three wickets and scored 3 runs. In the second innings of the inaugural Test match he scored his first Test fifty when batting at no.7, becoming only the second Irish player after Kevin O'Brien to score a Test fifty during the same match, eventually where O'Brien went onto score a Test hundred. He also notched a 114 runstand with Kevin O'Brien during the Ireland's second innings to uplift the team from an innings defeat after being forced to follow on.

In January 2019, he was named in Ireland's squad for their one-off Test against Afghanistan in India. In September 2019, he was named in Ireland's squad for the 2019 ICC T20 World Cup Qualifier tournament in the United Arab Emirates.

On 18 July 2020, Thompson was added to Ireland's touring squad to travel to England to start training behind closed doors for the ODI series against the England cricket team.
