= Stormont Cricket Ground =

Cricket ground at Stormont near Belfast, Northern Ireland

Coordinates: 54°35′49″N 5°50′04″W

Civil Service Cricket Club Ground
- Stormont
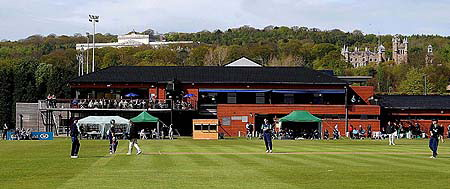
- Interactive map of Civil Service Cricket Club Ground

Ground information
- Location: Belfast, Northern Ireland
- Country: Northern Ireland
- Establishment: 1949
- Capacity: 6,000
- End names
- Dundonald End; City End

International information
- First men's Test: 25–28 July 2024: Ireland v Zimbabwe
- Last men's Test: 27–30 May 2026: Ireland v New Zealand
- First men's ODI: 13 June 2006: Ireland v England
- Last men's ODI: 13 September 2021: Ireland v Zimbabwe
- First men's T20I: 2 August 2008: Kenya v Netherlands
- Last men's T20I: 26 April 2026: Ireland v India
- First women's ODI: 5 August 1997: Ireland v South Africa
- Last women's ODI: 28 July 2025: Ireland v Zimbabwe
- First women's T20I: 10 July 2019: Ireland v Zimbabwe
- Last women's T20I: 27 May 2021: Ireland v Scotland

Team information
Civil Service North of Ireland	(2005)
Northern Knights	(2017–present)
- As of 27 May 2026; Source: Cricinfo

The Stormont, also known as Civil Service Cricket Club Ground, is an international and first-class cricket ground in Belfast, Northern Ireland. It is situated in the grounds of the Stormont Estate, the seat of government in Northern Ireland, and is the home of Civil Service North of Ireland Cricket Club.

== International cricket ==
It is one of four ODI grounds in Ireland, the others being the Bready in Magheramason and Clontarf and Malahide in Dublin. The ground was established in 1949 and saw its first ODI in June 2006: the inaugural ODI match for the Irish cricket team, against England.

In 2007, a three-match ODI series between India and South Africa was played at this ground, and in 2008 it hosted the qualifying tournament for the ICC World Twenty20.

It was selected as a venue to host matches in the 2015 ICC World Twenty20 Qualifier tournament. The ground hosted its first Test match when Ireland played Zimbabwe in July 2024. Ireland beat Zimbabwe by four wickets and recorded a second consecutive Test victory and a first on home soil.

In 2026, it hosted a two-match T20I series between India and Ireland.

== International centuries ==
Seven ODI centuries have been scored at the venue, two of them by Ireland's own Ed Joyce.

No.	Score	Player	Team	Balls	Opposing team	Date	Result
1	113	Marcus Trescothick	England	114	Ireland	13 June 2006	Won
2	101	Junaid Siddique	Bangladesh	123	Ireland	15 July 2010	Lost
3	108	William Porterfield	Ireland	116	Bangladesh	15 July 2010	Won
4	109	Paul Stirling	Ireland	107	Pakistan	30 May 2011	Lost
5	105*	Ed Joyce (1/2)	Ireland	135	Afghanistan	14 July 2016	Won
6	160*	Ed Joyce (2/2)	Ireland	148	Afghanistan	19 July 2016	Won
7	101	Mohammad Shahzad	Afghanistan	88	Ireland	21 May 2019	Won

== International five-wicket hauls ==
=== One Day Internationals ===
Five-wicket hauls in Men's One Day International matches at Civil Service Cricket Club
No.	Bowler	Date	Team	Opposing Team	Inn	O	R	W	Result
1	Gulbadin Naib	21 May 2019	Afghanistan	Ireland	2	9.2	43	6	Afghanistan won
2	Tim Murtagh	4 July 2019	Ireland	Zimbabwe	2	10	21	5	Ireland won

=== Twenty20 Internationals ===
Five-wicket hauls in Men's Twenty20 International matches at Civil Service Cricket Club
No.	Bowler	Date	Team	Opposing Team	Inn	O	R	W	Result
1	Elias Sunny	18 July 2012	Bangladesh	Ireland	2	4	13	5	Bangladesh won
