= Simi Singh =

Irish cricketer (born 1987)

Personal information
- Full name: Simranjit Singh
- Born: 4 February 1987 (age 39); Bathlana, Punjab, India
- Batting: Right-handed
- Bowling: Right-arm off break
- Role: All-rounder

International information
- National side: Ireland (2017–2022)
- ODI debut (cap 52): 14 May 2017 v New Zealand
- Last ODI: 12 July 2022 v New Zealand
- T20I debut (cap 42): 12 June 2018 v Netherlands
- Last T20I: 23 October 2022 v Sri Lanka

Domestic team information
- Years: Team
- 2013–2023: Leinster Lightning

Career statistics
Competition	ODI	T20I	FC	LA
Matches	35	53	13	79
Runs scored	593	296	612	1,614
Batting average	22.80	10.20	36.00	27.82
100s/50s	1/1	0/1	2/2	2/6
Top score	100*	57*	121	121*
Balls bowled	1,519	965	1,785	3,239
Wickets	39	44	27	84
Bowling average	25.92	27.84	25.25	27.48
5 wickets in innings	1	0	1	1
10 wickets in match	0	0	0	0
Best bowling	5/10	3/9	5/38	5/10
Catches/stumpings	13/–	16/–	6/–	28/–
- Source: Cricinfo, 8 February 2026

Simranjit "Simi" Singh (born 4 February 1987) is an Indian born Irish cricketer. In December 2018, he was one of nineteen players to be awarded a central contract by Cricket Ireland for the 2019 season. In January 2020, he was one of nineteen players to be awarded a central contract from Cricket Ireland, the first year in which all contracts were awarded on a full-time basis.

== Domestic and T20 career ==
Singh made his List A debut for Leinster Lightning in the 2017 Inter-Provincial Cup on 1 May 2017.

Singh made his Twenty20 cricket debut for Leinster Lightning in the 2017 Inter-Provincial Trophy on 26 May 2017. He made his first-class debut for Leinster Lightning in the 2017 Inter-Provincial Championship on 5 June 2017.

In July 2019, Singh was selected to play for the Dublin Chiefs in the inaugural edition of the Euro T20 Slam cricket tournament. However, the following month the tournament was cancelled.

Singh was the leading run-scorer and wicket-taker in the 2019 Inter-Provincial Championship, finishing the tournament with 204 runs and 13 wickets.

== International career ==
In May 2017, Singh was named in Ireland's One Day International (ODI) squad for their tri-series tournament featuring Bangladesh and New Zealand. He made his ODI debut for Ireland against New Zealand on 14 May 2017.

In June 2018, Singh was named in Ireland's Twenty20 International (T20I) squad for the 2018 Netherlands Tri-Nation Series. He made his T20I debut against the Netherlands on 12 June 2018. He scored 57 not out on debut and became the first batsman to score a fifty on T20I debut batting at number 8 or lower.

In January 2019, Singh was named in Ireland's squad for their one-off Test against Afghanistan in India, but he did not play. In July 2019, he was named in Ireland's Test squad for their one-off match against England at Lord's, but he did not play again. In September 2019, he was named in Ireland's squad for the 2019 ICC T20 World Cup Qualifier tournament in the United Arab Emirates.

On 10 July 2020, Singh was named in Ireland's 21-man squad to travel to England to start training behind closed doors for the ODI series against the England cricket team.

On 18 January 2021, against the UAE, Singh took his first five-wicket haul in ODI cricket, with five wickets for ten runs off his ten overs. On 16 July 2021, against South Africa, Singh scored his first century in ODI cricket, with 100 not out. He also became the first batsman to score a century in ODI cricket batting at number 8 or lower. In September 2021, Singh was named in Ireland's provisional squad for the 2021 ICC Men's T20 World Cup.

In the annual ICC Awards in January 2022, he was included in ICC Men's ODI Team of the Year for the year 2021.
