= Leinster Lightning =

Irish provincial cricket team

Personnel
- Captain: Lorcan Tucker
- Coach: Andre Botha
- Owner: Cricket Leinster

Team information
- Colours: Blue
- Founded: 2013
- Home ground: Sydney Parade & Oak Hill Cricket Club Ground

History
- Inter-Provincial Championship wins: 6
- Inter-Provincial Cup wins: 7
- Inter-Provincial Trophy wins: 10
- Official website: Cricket Leinster

Leinster Lightning is an Irish inter-provincial cricket team. They participate in the Inter-Provincial Championship, Inter-Provincial Cup and Inter-Provincial Trophy.

The team is based in Dublin and is managed by Cricket Leinster.

== History ==
In 2013, Cricket Ireland formed the three-day Interprovincial Championship, Cup and Trophy, featuring teams from Leinster, the NCU and the North West. The Leinster team is known as Leinster Lightning.

In January 2015, Ted Williamson was announced as the new head coach, taking over from Trent Johnston. Under his coaching, Leinster Lightning took a clean-sweep of trophies in the 2015 and 2016 seasons before he stepped down from the position.

Up to and including the 2016 Inter-Provincial Championship, the matches were not given first-class status. However, at an International Cricket Council meeting in October 2016, first-class status was awarded to all future matches.

In 2019, Nigel Jones was appointed Head Coach and Pathway Manager. Following the 2019 season the Inter-Provincial Championship was suspended due to the COVID-19 pandemic and had not yet returned as of October 2025.

In the history of the Inter-provincial series, Lightning have won 22 of the available 29 trophies.

2023 was the first season in which the team failed to win at least one competition.

== Honours ==
Inter-Provincial Championship - (First Class) - 6 titles

Winners: 2013, 2014, 2015, 2016 and 2017 and 2019

Inter-Provincial Cup - (List A) - 8 titles

Winners: 2014, 2015, 2016, 2017, 2018, 2019, 2020 and 2021

Inter-Provincial Trophy - (T20) - 8 titles

Winners: 2013, 2015, 2016, 2017, 2018, 2020 and 2022, 2024

== Current squad ==
- ‡ denotes players with international caps.
- * denotes players qualified to play for Ireland on residency or dual nationality.

Name	Nationality	Birth date	Batting style	Bowling style	Club	Notes
Batters
Christopher De Freitas *‡	Portugal	6 February 2002 (age 24)	Right-handed	Right-arm off break	Balbriggan	
Harry Tector ‡	Ireland	6 December 1999 (age 26)	Right-handed	Right-arm off break	Pembroke	Ireland central contract
Tim Tector ‡	Ireland	7 March 2003 (age 23)	Right-handed	Right-arm off break	Pembroke	Ireland retainer contract
All-rounders
Curtis Campher ‡	Ireland	20 April 1999 (age 27)	Right-handed	Right-arm medium-fast	Clontarf	Ireland central contract
George Dockrell ‡	Ireland	22 July 1992 (age 33)	Right-handed	Slow left-arm orthodox	Phoenix	Ireland central contract
Wicket-keepers
Stephen Doheny ‡	Ireland	20 August 1998 (age 27)	Right-handed	Right-arm off break	Merrion	Ireland central contract
Lorcan Tucker ‡	Ireland	10 September 1996 (age 29)	Right-handed	—	Pembroke	Captain; Ireland central contract
Bowlers
David Delany ‡	Ireland	28 December 1997 (age 28)	Right-handed	Right-arm fast-medium	Clontarf	
Gavin Hoey ‡	Ireland	5 November 2001 (age 24)	Right-handed	Right-arm leg break	Pembroke	Ireland central contract
Matt Hollard ‡	Ireland	14 April 1999 (age 27)	Right-handed	Right-arm medium-fast	Balbriggan	Ireland retainer contract
Josh Little ‡	Ireland	1 November 1999 (age 26)	Right-handed	Left-arm fast-medium	Pembroke	Ireland central contract
Barry McCarthy ‡	Ireland	13 September 1992 (age 33)	Right-handed	Right-arm fast-medium	Pembroke	Ireland central contract
Jai Moondra ‡	Ireland	10 January 1997 (age 29)	Left-handed	Left-arm fast-medium	Leinster	
Ben White ‡	Ireland	29 August 1998 (age 27)	Right-handed	Right-arm leg break	Phoenix	Ireland retainer contract
