= Northern Knights (cricket team) =

Provincial cricket team on the island of Ireland

Personnel
- Captain: Matthew Humphreys
- Coach: Simon Johnston
- Owner: Northern Cricket Union of Ireland

Team information
- Colors: Navy and Red
- Founded: 2013
- Home ground: Stormont Cricket Ground, Belfast
- Capacity: 7,000

History
- Inter-Provincial Championship wins: 0
- Interprovincial One-Day Trophy wins: 2
- Interprovincial Twenty20 Cup wins: 1

Northern Knights is a first-class inter-provincial cricket team in Ireland.

The team participates in the Inter-Provincial Championship, Interprovincial One-Day Trophy & Interprovincial Twenty20 Cup.

The team represents the Northern Cricket Union of Ireland, which in turn covers most of eastern and southern Ulster and parts of western Ulster.

== History ==
In 2013, Cricket Ireland formed a three-day Championship, 50 over Cup and 20 over Trophy featuring teams from Leinster, the North and the North West. The NCU team would be known as the Northern Knights. On 8 April, they announced Eugene Moleon as their coach and Gavin Rogers as his assistant coach.

The Knights lifted their first trophy, the Inter-Provincial Cup, in that debut season. A surprise final day victory by the North West Warriors over Leinster Lightning ensured the Knights won the title by a single point.

Up to and including the 2016 Inter-Provincial Championship, the matches were not given first-class status. However, at an International Cricket Council meeting in October 2016, first-class status was awarded to all future matches.

In January 2016, Simon Johnston, then head of Waringstown Cricket Club, was appointed head coach of the team, replacing Eugene Moleon.

In would be 2019 before the Knights silverware drought came to an end. The team won 3 of their 6 Inter-Provincial Trophy games in a rain-affected season which was enough for captain Gary Wilson to lift the trophy.

Following Wilson's retirement, Harry Tector took over captaincy duties for the 2021 season. He was succeeded by Mark Adair in 2022.

2023 was the most successful year in the team's history as they completed a List A and T20 double.

== Honours ==
Inter-Provincial Cup - (List A) - 2 titles

Winners: 2013, 2023

Inter-Provincial Trophy - (T20) - 1 title

Winners: 2023

== Current squad ==
- ‡ denotes players with international caps.
- * denotes players qualified to play for Ireland on residency or dual nationality.

Name	Nationality	Birth date	Batting style	Bowling style	Club	Notes
Batters
Ross Adair ‡	Ireland	21 April 1994 (age 32)	Right-handed	Slow left-arm orthodox	Lisburn	Captain; Ireland central contract
Cade Carmichael ‡	Ireland	8 March 2002 (age 24)	Right-handed	Right-arm medium	Instonians	Ireland central contract
Shane Dadswell	South Africa	18 November 1997 (age 28)	Right-handed	Right-arm medium-fast	Instonians	
James McCollum ‡	Ireland	1 August 1995 (age 30)	Right-handed	Right-arm medium	Waringstown	
Paul Stirling ‡	Ireland	3 September 1990 (age 35)	Right-handed	Right-arm off break	—	Ireland central contract
Charles Swart *	South Africa	—	Right-handed	—	C.I.Y.M.S.	
Morgan Topping	Ireland	25 March 1999 (age 27)	Right-handed	Right-arm off break	Waringstown	
All-rounders
Mark Adair ‡	Ireland	27 March 1996 (age 30)	Right-handed	Right-arm fast-medium	Lisburn	Ireland central contract
Adam Leckey	Ireland	25 September 2006 (age 19)	Right-handed	Right-arm medium	CSNI	
Jordan Neill ‡	Ireland	3 September 2005 (age 20)	Right-handed	Right-arm medium-fast	CSNI	
Wicket-keepers
Kian Hilton	Ireland	11 February 2005 (age 21)	Right-handed	—	North Down	
Sam Topping	Ireland	6 May 2005 (age 21)	Left-handed	—	Waringstown	
Bowlers
Harry Dyer	Ireland	15 March 2006 (age 20)	Right-handed	Right-arm off break	CSNI	
Matthew Foster	Ireland	15 January 2000 (age 26)	Left-handed	Right-arm fast-medium	Waringstown	
Matthew Humphreys ‡	Ireland	28 September 2002 (age 23)	Right-handed	Slow left arm orthodox	Instonians	Ireland central contract
Thomas Mayes ‡	Ireland	4 January 2001 (age 25)	Right-handed	Right-arm medium-fast	North Down	Ireland retainer contract
Carson McCullough	Ireland	28 February 2005 (age 21)	Right-handed	Slow left arm orthodox	C.I.Y.M.S.	
Cian Robertson	Ireland	19 August 2002 (age 23)	Right-handed	Slow left-arm orthodox	Instonians	
Reuben Wilson ‡	Ireland	17 September 2006 (age 19)	Right-handed	Right-arm medium	Clontarf	Ireland education contract
