= 2013 Inter-Provincial Trophy =

2013 Interprovincial Twenty20 Cup
- Administrator: Cricket Ireland
- Cricket format: 20 over
- Tournament format: Double round-robin
- Participants: 3
- Matches: 6

The 2013 Interprovincial Twenty20 Cup was the first season of the Interprovincial Twenty20 Cup, the domestic Twenty20 cricket competition of Ireland. The competition was played between Leinster Lightning, Northern Knights, and North West Warriors.

The competition was won by Leinster Lightning, who won the last game of the competition, against North West Warriors at Bready CC, to draw level with Northern Knights on 6 points, but finish top of the table on Net Run Rate.

The Interprovincial Series has been funded at least partly by the ICC via their TAPP programme.

== Points table ==
Pos	Team	Pld	W	L	Pts	NRR
1	Leinster Lightning (C)	4	3	1	6	3.003
2	Northern Knights (R)	4	3	1	6	−0.364
3	North West Warriors	4	0	4	0	−2.588

(C) Champions; (R) Runners-up

== Squads ==
Leinster Lightning	Northern Knights	North West Warriors
Kevin O'Brien (captain); Ben Ackland; Bill Coghlan; Pat Collins; Alex Cusack; Tyrone Kane; Fintan McAllister; Barry McCarthy; John Mooney; Stephen Moreton; Stuart Poynter; Eddie Richardson; Max Sorensen; Reinhardt Strydom; Albert van der Merwe	Andrew White (captain); Phil Eaglestone; Peter Eakin; James Holmes; Nigel Jones; Nick Larkin; Rory McCann; Eugene Moleon; Lee Nelson; James Shannon; David Simpson; Nikolai Smith; Jonny Terrett; Greg Thompson; Ben Wylie	Iftikhar Hussain (captain); Brian Allen; Andrew Britton; Gareth Burns; Scott Campbell; Peter Connell; Rickie-Lee Dougherty; Ryan Hunter; Andrew McBrine; Dean McCarter; Niall McDonnell; Andrew McGinnis; Gareth McKeegan; Jason Milligan; David Rankin; Andrew Riddles; Johnny Thompson; Stuart Thompson; Craig Young

== Fixtures ==
Match 1
21 June 2013
Scorecard

North West Warriors; 78 (18.1 overs)	v	Leinster Lightning; 81/3 (11 overs)
Andrew McBrine 27* (29); Max Sorensen 3/13 (3 overs)		Andrew Poynter 28* (18); Gareth Burns 1/5 (2 overs)

Leinster Lightning won by 7 wickets
Pembroke CC, Dublin
Umpires: Azam Ali Baig & Louis Fourie

- Leinster Lightning 2; North West Warriors 0

Match 2
21 June 2013
Scorecard

Leinster Lightning; 177/4 (20 overs)	v	Northern Knights; 119 (18.5 overs)
Pat Collins 66 (54); Andrew White 2/24 (4 overs)		Nigel Jones 22 (23); Barry McCarthy 3/24 (3 overs)

Leinster Lightning won by 58 runs
Pembroke CC, Dublin
Umpires: Azam Ali Baig & Martin Block

- Leinster Lightning 2; Northern Knights 0

Match 3
16 July 2013
Scorecard

Leinster Lightning; 143/8 (20 overs)	v	Northern Knights; 144/5 (20 overs)
Andrew Poynter 37; Peter Eakin 2/15 (4 overs)		Nigel Jones 77; Eddie Richardson 3/23 (4 overs)

Northern Knights won by 5 wickets
North Down CC, Comber
Umpires: Mark Hawthorne & Noel McCarey

- Northern Knights 2; Leinster Lightning 0

Match 4
16 July 2013
Scorecard

North West Warriors; 144/5 (20 overs)	v	Northern Knights; 148/4 (19 overs)
Johnny Thompson 51 (45); Ben Wylie 2/19 (4 overs)		James Shannon 62*; Peter Connell 1/10 (3 overs)

Northern Knights won by 6 wickets
North Down CC, Comber
Umpires: Mark Hawthorne & Noel McCarey

- Northern Knights 2; North West Warriors 0

Match 5
21 July 2013
Scorecard

North West Warriors; 92 (20 overs)	v	Northern Knights; 95/5 (18 overs)
Scott Campbell 19 (22); Andrew White 3/17 (4 overs)		Nigel Jones 22*; Andrew McBrine 3/12 (4 overs)

Northern Knights won by 5 wickets
Bready CC
Umpires: Roland Black & Paul Simpson

- Northern Knights 2; North West Warriors 0

Match 6
21 July 2013
Scorecard

Leinster Lightning; 192/5 (20 overs)	v	North West Warriors; 86 (18.5 overs)
Max Sorensen 38 (27); Gareth Burns 2/29 (4 overs)		Dean McCarter 20 (33); Tyrone Kane 3/17 (4 overs)

Leinster Lightning won by 106 runs
Bready CC
Umpires: Roland Black & Paul Simpson

- Leinster Lightning 2; North West Warriors 0

== Records ==
=== Highest Individual Innings ===
Score (BF)	Player	For	Opps	Venue	Date
77 (55)	Nigel Jones	NK	LL	Pembroke CC	21 Jun
66 (54)	Pat Collins	LL	NK	Pembroke CC	21 Jun
62 (42)	James Shannon	NK	NWW	North Down CC	16 Jul
51* (45)	Jonathan Thompson	NWW	NK	North Down CC	16 Jul

=== Best Bowling in an Innings ===
Overs	Mdns	Runs	Wkts	Player	For	Opps	Venue	Date
4	0	12	3	Andrew McBrine	NWW	NK	Bready CC	21 Jul
3	0	13	3	Max Sorensen	LL	NWW	Pembroke CC	21 Jun
3	0	13	3	Alex Cusack	LL	NK	Pembroke CC	21 Jun
4	0	17	3	Tyrone Kane	LL	NWW	Bready CC	21 Jul
4	0	17	3	Andrew White	NK	NWW	Bready CC	21 Jul

=== Season Aggregates ===
==== Most runs ====
Runs	Player	Avge	Str Rate	HS
133	Nigel Jones	44.33	113.68	77
113	Pat Collins	28.25	118.95	66
96	James Shannon	24.00	131.51	62
94	Andrew Poynter	31.33	116.05	37

==== Most wickets ====
Wickets	Economy	Player	Matches	Best Bowling
9	5.79	Eddie Richardson	4	3/23
6	5.21	Andrew White	4	3/17
6	5.27	Albert van der Merwe	4	2/12
6	6.00	Max Sorensen	4	3/13

== See also ==
- 2013 Interprovincial Championship
- 2013 Interprovincial One-Day Trophy
