= 2014 Inter-Provincial Cup =

- Administrator: Cricket Ireland
- Cricket format: List A
- Tournament format: Double round-robin
- Participants: 3

The 2014 Inter-Provincial Cup is the second season of the Inter-Provincial Cup, the domestic List A cricket competition of Ireland. The competition is played between Leinster Lightning, Northern Knights and North-West Warriors.

The Leinster Lightning won this year's competition with a game to spare, after beating the Northern Knights at Waringstown. In the final match of the season, at Rathmines against the same opposition, the Lightning won again to finish the competition with a 100% record of four wins out of four.

The Inter-Provincial Series has been funded at least partly by the ICC via their TAPP programme.

== Final Table ==
| Team | Pld | W | L | TNR | BP | Pts | NRR |
|---|---|---|---|---|---|---|---|
| Leinster Lightning | 4 | 4 | 0 | 0 | 1 | 17 | +0.942 |
| Northern Knights | 4 | 1 | 2 | 1 | 1 | 7 | +0.247 |
| North-West Warriors | 4 | 0 | 3 | 1 | 0 | 2 | -2.011 |

== Squads ==
| Leinster Lightning | Northern Knights | North-West Warriors |
|---|---|---|
| John Mooney (Captain); Ben Ackland; Yaqoob Ali; John Anderson; Andrew Balbirnie; Pat Collins; George Dockrell; Tyrone Kane; Fintan McAllister; Barry McCarthy; David Murphy; Kevin O'Brien; Andrew Poynter; Stuart Poynter; Eddie Richardson; Max Sorensen; Fiachra Tucker | Andrew White (Captain); Stephen Bunting; James Cameron-Dow; Allen Coulter; Adam Dennison; Christopher Dougherty; Phil Eaglestone; Shane Getkate; Neil Gill; Nigel Jones; Nick Larkin; James McCollum; Christopher McMorran; Lee Nelson; Zach Rushe; James Shannon; David Simpson; Greg Thompson; Jason van der Merwe; Nathan Waller | Andrew McBrine (Captain); Brian Allen; Andrew Austin; David Barr; Scott Campbell; Richi Chopra; Rickie-Lee Dougherty; Iftikhar Hussain; Gary McClintock; Niall McDonnell; Jason Milligan; Matt Moran; David Rankin; Andrew Riddles; Johnny Thompson; Stuart Thompson; Craig Young |

== Fixtures ==
The tournament ran from 3 May to 20 September.

3 May
(scorecard)

| North-West Warriors; 285/4 (50 overs) | v | Leinster Lightning; 254/7 (38 overs/38) |
| Johnny Thompson 66* (47); Eddie Richardson 2/54 (10 overs) | | Andrew Balbirnie 103* (103); Andrew McBrine 2/50 (10 overs) |

Leinster Lightning won by 19 runs (D/L)
The Hills CC, Milverton
Umpires: Gordon Black & Sameer Dutt

- Points: Leinster Lightning 4, North-West Warriors 0

26 May
(scorecard)

| North-West Warriors; 120 ao (39.1 overs) | v | Northern Knights; 31/0 (7 overs) |
| Andrew Riddles 28 (41); Nigel Jones 3/19 (10 overs) |

No result
Coleraine CC
Umpires: Roland Black & Noel Dunn

- Points: North-West Warriors 2, Northern Knights 2

14 July
(scorecard)

| Northern Knights; 227/4 (42 overs/42) | v | North-West Warriors; 95/8 (23.3 overs/23.3) |
| Lee Nelson 47 (38); Richi Chopra 2/40 (9 overs) | | Andrew McBrine 24 (28); David Simpson 2/3 (4 overs) |

Northern Knights won by 107 runs (D/L)
North Down CC, Comber
Umpires: Mark Hawthorne & Jareth McCready

- Points: Northern Knights 5, North-West Warriors 0

16 August
(scorecard)

| Leinster Lightning; 158/5 (28 overs/28) | v | North-West Warriors; 160 ao (23.1 overs/28) |
| Andrew Balbirnie 88 (97); Craig Young 2/22 (6 overs) | | Gary McClintock 46 (34); Albert van der Merwe 3/30 (6 overs) |

Leinster Lightning won by 54 runs (D/L)
Strabane CC
Umpires: David Bradley & Charlie McElwee

- Points: Leinster Lightning 5, North-West Warriors 0

14 September
(scorecard)

| Leinster Lightning; 254/9 (50 overs) | v | Northern Knights; 207 ao (43.5 overs) |
| Andrew Poynter 124* (112); Greg Thompson 2/47 (10 overs) | | James McCollum 37* (50); Kevin O'Brien 3/24 (6 overs) |

Leinster Lightning won by 47 runs
Waringstown CC
Umpires: Alex Adam s& Alan Neill

- Points: Leinster Lightning 4, Northern Knights 0

20 September
(scorecard)

| Northern Knights; 192 ao (47.5 overs) | v | Leinster Lightning; 194/8 (43.5 overs) |
| Andrew White 44 (75); Tyrone Kane 4/31 (10 overs) | | John Anderson 80 (88); Neil Gill 3/35 (10 overs) |

Leinster Lightning won by 2 wickets
Leinster CC, Rathmines
Umpires: Azam Ali Baig & Kevin Gallagher

- Points: Leinster Lightning 4, Northern Knights 0

== See also ==
- 2014 Inter-Provincial Championship
- 2014 Inter-Provincial Trophy
- 2014 Irish cricket season
