= 2013 Inter-Provincial Cup =

- Administrator: Cricket Ireland
- Cricket format: One-day
- Tournament format: Double round-robin
- Participants: 3

The 2013 Inter-Provincial Cup was the first season of the Inter-Provincial Cup, the domestic 50-over one-day competition of Ireland. The competition was played between Leinster Lightning, Northern Knights and North West Warriors.

The Northern Knights were the inaugural winners of the competition, following a surprise last day defeat of Leinster Lightning by North West Warriors by 71 runs in Strabane. That result meant the Northern Knights finished top of the table with 10 points from four matches.

The Inter-Provincial Series has been funded at least partly by the ICC via their TAPP programme.

== Final Table ==
Team	Pld	W	L	TNR	BP	Pts	NRR
Northern Knights	4	2	1	1	0	10	+0.117
Leinster Lightning	4	2	2	0	1	9	+0.364
North West Warriors	4	1	2	1	1	7	-0.588

== Squads ==
Leinster Lightning	Northern Knights	North West Warriors
Kevin O'Brien (Captain); Ben Ackland; John Anderson; Andrew Balbirnie; Peter Chase; Bill Coghlan; Pat Collins; Alex Cusack; Trent Johnston; Tyrone Kane; Fintan McAllister; Barry McCarthy; John Mooney; Stephen Moreton; Andrew Poynter; Eddie Richardson; Max Sorensen; Albert van der Merwe	Andrew White (Captain); Christopher Dougherty; Phil Eaglestone; Peter Eakin; James Hall; Nigel Jones; Gary Kidd; Nick Larkin; Eugene Moleon; Lee Nelson; James Shannon; David Simpson; Michael Taiaroa; Jonny Terrett; Greg Thompson; Ben Wylie	Iftikhar Hussain (Captain); Brian Allen; David Barr; Andrew Britton; Gareth Burns; Scott Campbell; Peter Connell; Rickie-Lee Dougherty; Andrew McBrine; Niall McDonnell; Jason Milligan; David Rankin; Andrew Riddles; Johnny Thompson; Stuart Thompson; Craig Young

== Fixtures ==
6 May
(scorecard)

Northern Knights; 259/7 (50 overs)	v	Leinster Lightning; 260/8 (49 overs)
Lee Nelson 54 (56); Albert van der Merwe 2/46 (10 overs)		Kevin O’Brien 111* (89); David Simpson 2/21 (5 overs)

Leinster Lightning won by 2 wickets
The Hills CC, Milverton
Umpires: Gordon Black & Louis Fourie

- Points: Leinster Lightning 2; Northern Knights 0

19 May
(scorecard)

North West Warriors	v	Northern Knights

Match abandoned due to rain
Coleraine CC

- Points: North-West Warriors 2, Leinster Lightning 2

1 Jun
(Scorecard)

Leinster Lightning; 272/6 (50 overs)	v	North West Warriors; 123 all out (40.1 overs)
Ben Ackland 78 (102); Andrew McBrine 3/40 (10 overs)		Scott Campbell 27 (63); Andrew Balbirnie 3/14 (4 overs)

Leinster Lightning won by 149 runs
Malahide CC
Umpires: Gordon Black & Louis Fourie

- Points: Leinster Lightning 5, North-West Warriors 0

15 July
(scorecard)

North West Warriors; 232/9 (50 overs)	v	Northern Knights; 234/8 (48.1 overs)
Johnny Thompson 86 (82); Phil Eaglestone 3/17 (10 overs)		Nigel Jones 72 (67); Johnny Thompson 3/50 (8.1 overs)

Northern Knights won by 2 wickets
North Down CC, Comber
Umpires: Michael Ross & Richard Smith

- Points: Northern Knights 4; North-West Warriors 0

10 August
(scorecard)

Leinster Lightning; 243/9 (50 overs)	v	Northern Knights; 246/7 (48.1 overs)
Eddie Richardson 74 (79); Peter Eakin 3/44 (10 overs)		Lee Nelson 62 (64); Tyrone Kane 3/30 (6 overs)

Northern Knights won by 3 wickets
Waringstown CC
Umpires: Alex Adams & Jareth McCready

- Points: Northern Knights 4; Leinster Lightning 0

21 September
(scorecard)

North West Warriors; 230/8 (50 overs)	v	Leinster Lightning; 159 all out (45 overs)
Niall McDonnell 41 (57); Barry McCarthy 2/44 (10 overs)		Kevin O’Brien 39 (32); Andrew Riddles 4/31 (10 overs)

North-West Warriors won by 71 runs
Strabane CC
Umpires: Roland Black & Charlie McElwee

- Points: North-West Warriors 5; Leinster Lightning 0

== Records ==
=== Highest Individual Innings ===
Score (BF)	Player	For	Opps	Venue	Date
111* (87)	Kevin O'Brien	LL	NK	The Hills CC	6 May
86 (82)	Johnny Thompson	NWW	NK	North Down CC	15 Jul
78 (102)	Ben Ackland	LL	NWW	Malahide CC	1 Jun
74 (79)	Eddie Richardson	LL	NK	Waringstown CC	10 Aug
72 (67)	Nigel Jones	NK	NWW	North Down CC	15 Jul
71* (51)	Kevin O'Brien	LL	NWW	Malahide CC	1 Jun

=== Best Bowling in an Innings ===
Overs	Mdns	Runs	Wkts	Player	For	Opps	Venue	Date
10	1	31	4	Andrew Riddles	NWW	LL	Strabane CC	21 Sep
4	0	14	3	Andrew Balbirnie	LL	NWW	Malahide CC	1 Jun
10	5	17	3	Phil Eaglestone	NK	NWW	North Down CC	15 Jul
6	0	30	3	Tyrone Kane	LL	NK	Waringstown CC	10 Aug
9.1	0	39	3	Max Sorensen	LL	NK	Waringstown CC	10 Aug
10	0	40	3	Andrew McBrine	NWW	LL	Malahide CC	1 Jun

=== Season Aggregates ===
==== Most runs ====
Runs	Player	Avge	Str Rate
221	Kevin O'Brien	221.00	130.00
162	John Anderson	40.50	62.55
137	Lee Nelson	45.67	84.57
116	Nigel Jones	38.67	93.55
105	Ben Ackland	35.00	76.09

==== Most wickets ====
Wickets	Economy	Player	Matches
7	4.53	Max Sorensen	4
6	3.95	Andrew Riddles	3
6	4.12	Andrew McBrine	3
5	4.19	Albert van der Merwe	4
5	4.23	Phil Eaglestone	3
5	5.78	David Simpson	3

== See also ==
- 2013 Inter-Provincial Championship
- 2013 Inter-Provincial Trophy
