= 2014 Inter-Provincial Championship =

- Administrator: Cricket Ireland
- Cricket format: 3-day
- Tournament format: Double round-robin
- Champions: Leinster Lightning (2nd title)
- Participants: 3
- Matches: 6
- Most runs: Craig Ervine (224)
- Most wickets: James Cameron-Dow (18)

The 2014 Inter-Provincial Championship is the second season of the Inter-Provincial Championship, the domestic three-day (though not officially first-class) cricket competition of Ireland. The competition is played between Leinster Lightning, Northern Knights and North West Warriors.

This year's competition was won by the Leinster Lightning, who secured a draw in their final match of the season to win the title. They retained the Championship, having won the inaugural Inter-Provincial Championship.

The Inter-Provincial Series has been funded at least partly by the International Cricket Council via their Targeted Assistance and Performance Programme (TAPP).

== Standings ==
Team	Pld	W	L	T	D	A	Bat	Bowl	Ded	Pts
Leinster Lightning	4	3	0	0	1	0	10	13	0	74
Northern Knights	4	1	2	0	1	0	5	13	0	37
North West Warriors	4	1	3	0	0	0	3	16	0	35

== Squads ==
Leinster Lightning	Northern Knights	North West Warriors
John Mooney (Captain); Ben Ackland; John Anderson; Kenny Carroll; Bill Coghlan; Pat Collins; Tyrone Kane; Fintan McAllister; Cormac McLoughlan; Kevin O'Brien; Andrew Poynter; Eddie Richardson; Simi Singh; Max Sorensen; Albert van der Merwe	Andrew White (Captain); Mark Adair; James Cameron-Dow; Allen Coulter; Christopher Dougherty; Craig Ervine; Shane Getkate; Nick Larkin; Lee Nelson; James Shannon; David Simpson; Nathan Waller; Imad Wasim; Greg Thompson; Robert McKinley; JW Terrett; James McCollum; Adam Dennison; Neil Gill; Zach Rushe	Andrew McBrine (Captain); Jared Barnes; David Barr; Scott Campbell; Rickie-Lee Dougherty; Ernest Kemm; Tabish Khan; Gary McClintock; William McClintock; Niall McDonnell; Jason Milligan; David Rankin; Andrew Riddles; Johnny Thompson; Stuart Thompson; Craig Young; Ross Allen

== Fixtures ==
20–22 May
Scorecard

North West Warriors	v	Leinster Lightning
176 (62.5 overs); NJ McDonnell 53 (86); EJ Richardson 4/42 (18.5 overs)		220 (71.5 overs); FP McAllister 48* (99); CA Young 5/37 (16 overs)
105 (34.2 overs); CA Young 20* (17); JF Mooney 4/22 (12 overs)		65/6 (23 overs); BJ Ackland 19 (36); EH Kemm 3/15 (8 overs)

Leinster Lightning won by 4 wickets
Bready CC, Magheramason
Umpires: CA McElwee and RP Smith

- Leinster won the toss and elected to field
- Points: Leinster 22, North West Warriors 5

3–5 June
Scorecard

North West Warriors	v	Northern Knights
190 (67.2 overs); J Thompson 40 (69); SC Getkate 4/25 (11.2 overs)		187 (47.2 overs); NCR Larkin 40 (59); T Khan 6/55 (17.2 overs)
150 (61.1 overs); RL Dougherty 41 (87); NR Waller 4/24 (9.1 overs)		157/2 (41.2 overs); CR Ervine 72* (124); CA Young 1/28 (8 overs)

Northern Knights won by 8 wickets
Stormont, Belfast
Umpires: AJ Neill and CA McElwee

- Northern Knights won the toss and elected to field
- Points: Northern Knights 21, North West Warriors 5

17–19 June
Scorecard

Leinster Lightning	v	Northern Knights
290/9d (99.4 overs); J Anderson 60 (150); SC Getkate 3/47 (14 overs)		144 (51.2 overs); SC Getkate 34 (48); MC Sorensen 4/34 (12 overs)
187/6d (56.5 overs); AD Poynter 62 (81); I Wasim 2/21 (9 overs)		176 (81.1 overs); NCR Larkin 40 (90); EJ Richardson 3/24 (12 overs)

Leinster Lightning won by 157 runs
College Park, Dublin
Umpires: A Ali Baig and S Dutt

- Leinster Lightning won the toss and elected to bat
- Points: Leinster 23, Northern Knights 4

1–3 July
Scorecard

Leinster Lightning	v	North West Warriors
324 (109 overs); MC Sorensen 86 (151); CA Young 4/91 (22 overs)		188 (65.4 overs); EH Kemm 55* (155); JF Mooney 3/34 (17 overs)
156/2d (36.5 overs); FP McAllister 71 (103); AR McBrine 2/33 (8.5 overs)		227 (67.4 overs); AR McBrine 87 (120); A van der Merwe 4/54 (17.4 overs)

Leinster Lightning won by 65 runs
Malahide, Dublin
Umpires: L Fourie and K Gallagher

- Leinster Lightning won the toss and chose to bat
- Points: Leinster 23, North West Warriors 5

12–14 August
Scorecard

Northern Knights	v	Leinster Lightning
312/4d (76 overs); CR Ervine 131 (176); MC Sorensen 2/60 (16 overs)		205/3d (55.1 overs); KED Carroll 77 (117); GJ Thompson 1/36 (9 overs)

Match Drawn
Waringstown CC, Waringstown
Umpires: NT McCarey and M Hawthorne

- Northern Knights won the toss and elected to bat
- No play on day 2 due to rain
- Points: Northern Knights 8, Leinster 6

26–28 August
Scorecard

North West Warriors	v	Northern Knights
137 (46 overs); G McClintock 57 (92); AR White 3/31 (14 overs)		119 (50.5 overs); C Dougherty 37 (75); CA Young 2/6 (7 overs)
250 (75.1 overs); J Thompson 53 (88); J Cameron-Dow 7/107 (34 overs)		224 (88.1 overs); NL Smith 46 (108); AR McBrine 5/52 (25 overs)

North West Warriors won by 44 runs
Eglinton CC, Eglinton
Umpires: RE Black and D Bradley

- Northern Knights won the toss and elected to field
- Points: North West Warriors 20, Northern Knights 4

== See also ==
- 2014 Inter-Provincial Cup
- 2014 Inter-Provincial Trophy
- 2014 Irish cricket season
