= 2014 Inter-Provincial Trophy =

- Administrator: Cricket Ireland
- Cricket format: 20 over
- Tournament format: Double round-robin
- Participants: 3

The 2014 Inter-Provincial Trophy is the second season of the Inter-Provincial Trophy, the domestic Twenty20 cricket competition of Ireland. The competition is played between Leinster Lightning, Northern Knights and North-West Warriors.

The North-West Warriors won the 2014 competition, winning by three points from Leinster Lightning. The final days matches, scheduled for Pembroke CC in Dublin, were abandoned due to bad weather, meaning that the Warriors maintained their lead at the top of the table.

The player of the tournament was David Rankin of the North-West Warriors.

The Inter-Provincial Series has been funded at least partly by the ICC via their TAPP programme.

== Table ==
Team	Pld	W	TNR	L	Pts	NRR
North-West Warriors	4	2	1	1	11	+0.503
Leinster Lightning	4	1	2	1	8	-0.417
Northern Knights	4	1	1	2	6	-0.216

The points system has changed for 2014, with 4 points now awarded for a win, 2 points for a tie or no result, and 1 bonus point available to a team winning a match with a run rate of 1.25 times that of the losing team.

== Squads ==
Leinster Lightning	Northern Knights	North-West Warriors
John Mooney (Captain); Andrew Balbirnie; Kenneth Carroll; Pat Collins; Bill Coghlan; Tyrone Kane; Fintan McAllister; Barry McCarthy; Andrew Poynter; Eddie Richardson; Max Sorensen; Albert van der Merwe	Andrew White (Captain); Mark Adair; James Cameron-Dow; Christopher Dougherty; Peter Eakin; Shane Getkate; Nigel Jones; Nick Larkin; Lee Nelson; James Shannon; David Simpson; Greg Thompson; Nathan Waller	Andy McBrine (Captain); Brian Allen; Andrew Britton; Scott Campbell; Richi Chopra; Rickie-Lee Dougherty; William McClintock; Jason Milligan; Matt Moran; David Rankin; Andrew Riddles; Johnny Thompson; Stuart Thompson; Craig Young

== Fixtures ==
6 July / Game 1
(scorecard)

North-West Warriors; 167/3 (20 overs)	v	Leinster Lightning; 110 all out (15.3 overs/16)
David Rankin 62 (50); Eddie Richardson 1/20 (4 overs)		Barry McCarthy 34 (24); Richi Chopra 3/31 (3 overs)

North-West Warriors won by 30 runs (D/L)
Bready CC
Umpires: Roland Black & Dermot Ward

- Delayed restart following rain during the interval; Leinster Lightning target revised to 141 from 16 overs. North-West Warriors 5 points

6 July / Game 2
(scorecard)

North-West Warriors; 149/9 (20 overs)	v	Northern Knights; 152/3 (19.1 overs)
David Rankin 73 (54); Peter Eakin 4/22 (4 overs)		Christopher Dougherty 58 (52); Richi Chopra 1/20 (4)

Northern Knights won by 7 wickets, with 5 balls to spare
Bready CC
Umpires: Roland Black & Noel Dunn

- Northern Knights 4 points

13 July / Game 1
(scorecard)

Leinster Lightning; 157/7 (20 overs)	v	Northern Knights; 142/6 (20 overs)
Andrew Poynter 70 (36); James Cameron-Dow 2/24 (4 overs)		Nigel Jones 51 (45); Albert van der Merwe 2/21 (4 overs)

Leinster Lightning won by 15 runs
North Down CC, Comber
Umpires: Noel McCarey & Michael Ross

- Points: Leinster Lightning 4 points

13 July / Game 2
(scorecard)

Northern Knights; 120/8 (20 overs)	v	North-West Warriors; 122/7 (19.2 overs)
Lee Nelson 29* (41); Andrew McBrine 2/18 (4 overs)		Stuart Thompson 26 (26); Greg Thompson 3/10 (4 overs)

North-West Warriors won by 3 wickets, with 4 balls to spare
North Down CC, Comber
Umpires: Mark Hawthorne & Noel McCarey

- Points: North-West Warriors 4 points

3 August / Game 1

Leinster Lightning	v	Northern Knights

Match Abandoned without a ball bowled
Pembroke CC, Dublin

- Points: Leinster Lightning 2 points, Northern Knights 2 points

3 August / Game 2

Leinster Lightning	v	North-West Warriors

Match Abandoned without a ball bowled
Pembroke CC, Dublin

- Points: Leinster Lightning 2 points, North-West Warriors 2 points

== See also ==
- 2014 Inter-Provincial Championship
- 2014 Inter-Provincial Cup
- 2014 Irish cricket season
