= 2013 Inter-Provincial Championship =

One of the Bombastic Championship season in the history of cricket

- Administrator: Cricket Ireland
- Cricket format: 3-day
- Tournament format: Double round-robin
- Champions: Leinster Lightning (1st title)
- Participants: 3
- Matches: 6
- Most runs: John Anderson (345)
- Most wickets: Phil Eaglestone (18)

The 2013 Interprovincial Championship was the first season of the Inter-Provincial Championship, the domestic multi-day cricket competition of Ireland. The competition comprised three contestants: Leinster Lightning, Northern Knights and North West Warriors.

The inaugural Inter-Provincial Championship was won by the Leinster Lightning, who clinched the title with one match to spare. Despite falling just four runs short of victory in their opening match, they then won their next two games before closing with a hard-fought, high-scoring draw against Northern Knights in the last game of the year at Waringstown.

The Inter-Provincial Series has been funded at least partly by the International Cricket Council via their Targeted Assistance and Performance Programme (TAPP).

== Table ==
| Team | Pld | W | D | L | BatBP | BowlBP | Dedns | Points |
|---|---|---|---|---|---|---|---|---|
| Leinster Lightning | 4 | 2 | 2 | 0 | 12 | 13 | 0 | 63 |
| Northern Knights | 4 | 1 | 2 | 1 | 8 | 13 | 0 | 43 |
| North West Warriors | 4 | 0 | 2 | 2 | 2 | 14 | 0 | 22 |

== Squads ==
| Leinster Lightning | Northern Knights | North West Warriors |
|---|---|---|
| Kevin O'Brien (Captain); Ben Ackland; John Anderson; Peter Chase; Bill Coghlan; Pat Collins; Alex Cusack; Tyrone Kane; Paul Lawson; Fintan McAllister; John Mooney; Andrew Poynter; Stuart Poynter; Eddie Richardson; Simi Singh; Max Sorensen; Albert van der Merwe | Andrew White (Captain); James Cameron-Dow; Allen Coulter; Christopher Dougherty; Phil Eaglestone; Craig Ervine; Nigel Jones; Nick Larkin; Rory McCann; Eugene Moleon; Lee Nelson; Zach Rushe; James Shannon; Nikolai Smith; Jonny Terrett; Greg Thompson; Nathan Waller | Iftikhar Hussain (Captain); Brian Allen; Andrew Britton; Gareth Burns; Scott Campbell; Peter Connell; Rickie-Lee Dougherty; Kamran Sajiid; Andrew McBrine; Dean McCarter; Niall McDonnell; Jason Milligan; Romano Ramoo; David Rankin; Andrew Riddles; Roy Silva; Johnny Thompson; Stuart Thompson; Craig Young |

== Fixtures ==
14–16 May
(Scorecard)

| North West Warriors | v | Leinster Lightning |
| 191 all out (65 overs); Andrew Riddles 47*; Kevin O'Brien 2/12 | | 319 all out (121.2 overs); Bill Coghlan 71; Peter Connell 4/59 |
| 153 all out (68.5 overs); Andrew Riddles 31; Max Sorensen 4/50 | | 22/5 (4 overs); Patrick Collins 10; Johnny Thompson 2/6 |

Match Drawn
College Park, Dublin
Umpires: David Bradley & Louis Fourie

- Leinster Lightning won the toss and chose to bowl
- Close of play (Day 1) – Leinster Lightning 105/1 (39 overs); (Day 2) – North-West Warriors 2nd inns 22/2 (9 overs). Leinster Lightning 10 pts, North-West Warriors 7 pts

4–6 June
(Scorecard)

| North West Warriors | v | Northern Knights |
| 116 all out (44.2 overs); Kamran Sajiid 47; Phil Eaglestone 3/35 | | 131 all out (48.3 overs); Jonny Terrett 29; Stuart Thompson 3/31 |
| 172 all out (60.1 overs); Rickie-Lee Dougherty 34; Phil Eaglestone 4/51 | | 160/7 (59.5 overs); James Shannon 49; Andrew McBrine 2/28 |

Northern Knights won by 3 wickets
Eglinton CC
Umpires: Roland Black & David Bradley

- Northern Knights won the toss and chose to bowl
- Close of play (Day 1) – North-West Warriors 2nd inns 12/0 (6 overs); (Day 2) – Northern Knights 2nd inns 97/5 (47 overs). Northern Knights 20 pts, North-West Warriors 4 pts

25–27 June
(Scorecard)

| Leinster Lightning | v | Northern Knights |
| 364 all out (93.4 overs); John Anderson 86; Phil Eaglestone 4/93 | | 123 all out (48.2 overs); Christopher Dougherty 60; John Mooney 3/18 |
| | | 228 for 9 (all out) (77 overs); Christopher Dougherty 69; Pat Collins 2/10 |

Leinster Lightning won by an innings and 13 runs
College Park, Dublin
Umpires: Azam Ali Baig & Louis Fourie

- Northern Knights won the toss and chose to bowl
- Close of play (Day 1) – Northern Knights 20/2 (7.3 overs); (Day 2) – Northern Knights 2nd inns 204/8 (69 overs). Leinster Lightning 24 pts, Northern Knights 4 pts

30 July – 1 August
(Scorecard)

| Northern Knights | v | North West Warriors |
| 301/9 dec. (99.2 overs); Craig Ervine 92; Iftikhar Hussain 3/70 | | 69/4 (22 overs); Niall McDonnell 26; Phil Eaglestone 2/30 |

Match drawn
Osborne Park, Belfast
Umpires: Noel McCarey & Charlie McElwee

- Northern Knights won the toss and chose to bat
- Close of play (Day 1) – Northern Knights 259/6 (90 overs); (Day 2) – North-West Warriors 69/4 (22 overs). No play on day 3 (Rain). Northern Knights 8 pts, North-West Warriors 7 pts.

13–14 August
(Scorecard)

| North West Warriors | v | Leinster Lightning |
| 164 all out (45 overs); David Rankin 28; Max Sorensen 4/41 | | 267/8 dec. (83.4 overs); John Anderson 91; Andrew McBrine 3/45 |
| 173 all out (55.5 overs); Andrew McBrine 48; John Anderson 3/4 | | 73/3 (17.1 overs); Ben Ackland 28; Johnny Thompson 2/21 |

Leinster Lightning won by 7 wickets
Bready CC
Umpires: David Bradley & Charlie McElwee

- North-West Warriors won the toss and chose to bat
- Close of play (Day 1) – Leinster Lightning 173/3 (57 overs). Match completed on day 2. Leinster Lightning 23 pts, North-West Warriors 4 pts.

27–29 August
(Scorecard)

| Northern Knights | v | Leinster Lightning |
| 501/4 dec. (117.1 overs); Nick Larkin 247*; John Mooney 3/73 | | 225 all out (93.5 overs); Ben Ackland 87; Phil Eaglestone 4/52 |
| | | 315/8 dec. (86 overs); Andrew Poynter 113; James Cameron-Dow 5/124 |

Match drawn
Waringstown CC
Umpires: Alan Neill & Charlie McElwee

- Northern Knights won the toss and chose to bat
- Close of play (Day 1) –; (Day 2) -. Northern Knights 11 pts, Leinster Lightning 6 pts.

== Records ==
=== Highest Individual Innings ===
| Score | Player | For | Opps | Venue | Date |
|---|---|---|---|---|---|
| 247* | Nick Larkin | NK | LL | Waringstown CC | 27-29 Aug |
| 113 | Andrew Poynter | LL | NK | Waringstown CC | 27-29 Aug |
| 92 | Craig Ervine | NK | NWW | Osborne Park | 30 Jul-1 Aug |
| 91 | John Anderson | LL | NWW | Bready CC | 13-14 Aug |
| 88 | Christopher Dougherty | NK | LL | Waringstown CC | 27-29 Aug |
| 87 | Ben Ackland | LL | NK | Waringstown CC | 27-29 Aug |
| 86 | John Anderson | LL | NK | College Park | 25-27 Jun |
| 76 | Simi Singh | LL | NWW | Bready CC | 13-14 Aug |
| 75 | Christopher Dougherty | NK | NWW | Osborne Park | 30 Jul-1 Aug |

=== Best Bowling in an Innings ===
| Overs | Mdns | Runs | Wkts | Player | For | Opps | Venue | Date |
|---|---|---|---|---|---|---|---|---|
| 35 | 7 | 124 | 5 | James Cameron-Dow | NK | LL | Waringstown CC | 27-29 Aug |
| 14 | 4 | 41 | 4 | Max Sorensen | LL | NWW | Bready CC | 13-14 Aug |
| 25 | 8 | 50 | 4 | Max Sorensen | LL | NWW | College Park | 14–16 May |
| 17 | 5 | 51 | 4 | Phil Eaglestone | NK | NWW | Eglinton CC | 4-6 Jun |
| 17 | 3 | 52 | 4 | Phil Eaglestone | NK | LL | Waringstown CC | 27-29 Aug |
| 27 | 7 | 59 | 4 | Peter Connell | NWW | LL | College Park | 14–16 May |
| 20 | 3 | 93 | 4 | Phil Eaglestone | NK | LL | College Park | 25-27 Jun |

=== Season Aggregates ===
==== Most runs ====
| Runs | Inns | Avge | Player | Highest |
|---|---|---|---|---|
| 345 | 7 | 57.50 | John Anderson | 91 |
| 334 | 6 | 66.80 | Christopher Dougherty | 88 |
| 247 | 2 | 247.00 | Nick Larkin | 247* |
| 195 | 5 | 48.75 | Andrew Poynter | 113 |
| 172 | 6 | 34.40 | Andrew Riddles | 47* |

==== Most wickets ====
| Wickets | Average | Player | Best Bowling |
|---|---|---|---|
| 18 | 16.94 | Phil Eaglestone | 4-51 |
| 15 | 20.67 | Max Sorensen | 4-41 |
| 12 | 15.00 | John Mooney | 3-12 |
| 10 | 22.20 | Eddie Richardson | 3-26 |
| 9 | 16.11 | Peter Connell | 4-59 |

== See also ==
- 2013 Interprovincial One-Day Trophy
- 2013 Interprovincial Twenty20 Cup
