= List of Northern Knights first-class players =

Irish cricket team

Northern Knights was formed in 2013 and became a first-class team in 2017. They played their inaugural first-class match in the 2017 Inter-Provincial Championship against North West Warriors. Northern Knights are yet to win the Interprovincial Championship, in either it time as a non first-class competition, or with first-class status. In total, 29 players have appeared in first-class cricket for Northern Knights, with James McCollum having played in all 11 first-class fixtures played by Northern Knights.

McCollum is Northern Knights leading run-scorer in first-class cricket, aggregating 750 runs. Three batsmen have scored a century for Northern Knights in the format: McCollum, James Shannon and Harry Tector. Tector's score of 146, is the highest score by a Northern Knights batsman, while Shannon has the teams best batting average: 61.33. Among the bowlers, South African-born James Cameron-Dow has taken more wickets than any other, claiming 15. McCollum has the best bowling figures in an innings: he claimed five wickets against North West Warriors in a 2018 match, while conceding 32 runs.

Players are initially listed in order of appearance; where players made their debut in the same match, they are initially listed by batting order.

== Key ==
General

- † – Wicket-keeper
- First – Year of first-class debut for Northern Knights
- Last – Year of latest first-class match for Northern Knights
- Mat – Number of first-class appearances for Northern Knights

Batting

- Runs – Runs scored in career
- HS – Highest score
- Avg – Runs scored per dismissal
- * – Batsman remained not out

Bowling

- Balls – Balls bowled in career
- Wkt – Wickets taken in career
- BBI – Best bowling in an innings
- Ave – Average runs per wicket

Fielding

- Ca – Catches taken
- St – Stumpings effected
All statistics correct as of the end of the Irish 2019 cricket season.

== List of first-class cricketers ==
Northern Knights first-class players
No.	Name	Nationality	First	Last	Mat	Runs	HS	Avg	Balls	Wkt	BBI	Ave	Ca	St	Ref(s)
No.	Name	Nationality	First	Last	Mat	Batting			Bowling				Fielding		Ref(s)
1	Adam Dennison	Ireland	2017	2017	2	45	36	11.25	0	–	–	–	0	0	
2	Christopher Dougherty †	Ireland	2017	2018	8	212	74	15.14	0	–	–	–	15	0	
3	James McCollum	Ireland	2017	2019	11	750	119*	46.87	96	5	5/32	12.40	1	0	
4	James Shannon	Ireland	2017	2018	6	552	140*	61.33	54	2	1/7	9.00	2	0	
5	Shane Getkate	Ireland	2017	2019	10	355	70	25.35	684	13	4/62	33.38	0	0	
6	Nikolai Smith	Ireland	2017	2018	5	67	28	8.37	353	8	2/25	17.50	1	0	
7	Greg Thompson	Ireland	2017	2017	2	75	37	25.00	0	–	–	–	1	0	
8	Lee Nelson	Ireland	2017	2017	2	32	17	10.66	48	–	–	–	0	0	
9	Robert McKinley	Ireland	2017	2017	3	91	43*	22.75	228	5	2/36	49.33	1	0	
10	Nathan Smith	Ireland	2017	2018	5	47	22*	7.83	630	6	4/34	52.50	1	0	
11	Gary Kidd	Ireland	2017	2018	5	20	10	6.66	766	13	3/36	29.30	3	0	
12	John Matchett	Ireland	2017	2018	3	51	27	8.50	12	–	–	–	3	0	
13	Graeme McCarter	Ireland	2017	2019	5	111	62*	27.75	597	5	2/37	55.20	1	0	
14	Jacob Mulder	Ireland	2017	2018	3	47	22	11.75	272	2	2/33	74.50	1	0	
15	Jamie Magowan †	Ireland	2017	2017	2	31	30	31.00	0	–	–	–	3	0	
16	Marc Ellison	New Zealand	2018	2019	7	225	65	22.50	0	–	–	–	6	0	
17	Harry Tector	Ireland	2018	2019	7	330	146	36.66	703	14	4/70	24.42	1	0	
18	Neil Rock †	Ireland	2018	2019	6	79	22*	15.80	0	–	–	–	11	1	
19	James Cameron-Dow	Ireland	2018	2019	7	102	39*	20.40	1,013	15	5/101	36.20	2	0	
20	James Magee	Ireland	2018	2018	1	0	0	0.00	60	–	–	–	0	0	
21	Mark Adair	Ireland	2018	2019	6	194	91	27.71	565	7	3/33	41.71	5	0	
22	Phil Eaglestone	Ireland	2018	2018	2	10	10*	5.00	183	1	1/63	148.00	0	0	
23	Aaron Wright	Ireland	2018	2018	1	19	18	9.50	0	–	–	–	0	0	
24	Matthew McCord	Ireland	2018	2018	1	50	46	50.00	90	1	1/22	41.00	1	0	
25	Gary Wilson †	Ireland	2019	2019	3	73	36	24.33	0	–	–	–	2	0	
26	Matthew Foster	Ireland	2019	2019	2	7	6	3.50	156	4	2/38	22.00	0	0	
27	Murray Commins	Ireland	2019	2019	2	1	1	0.50	0	–	–	–	1	0	
28	Josh Manley	Ireland	2019	2019	1	2	1*	2.00	66	2	2/50	25.00	0	0	
29	Ruhan Pretorius	South Africa	2019	2019	1	2	2	2.00	72	1	1/35	35.00	0	0	

== See also ==
- List of Northern Knights List A players
- List of Northern Knights Twenty20 players
- List of Irish first-class cricketers
