= 2015 Inter-Provincial Cup =

- Dates: 4 May 2015 – 30 August 2015
- Administrator(s): Cricket Ireland
- Cricket format: One Day
- Tournament format(s): Round-robin
- Champions: Leinster Lightning
- Participants: 3
- Matches: 6
- Most runs: Dominick Joyce (158)
- Most wickets: John Mooney (7); Andrew White (7)

The 2015 Inter-Provincial Cup was the third edition of the Inter-Provincial Cup, a One Day cricket competition played in Ireland. It was held from 4 May to 30 August 2015. Three teams competed; Leinster Lightning, North West Warriors and Northern Knights, with Leinster Lightning being the defending champions. Leinster Lightning retained their title, after going undefeated in the tournament.

== Points table ==
The following teams competed:

Team	Pld	W	L	T	NR	Pts
Leinster Lightning	4	3	0	0	1	17
Northern Knights	4	2	2	0	0	9
North West Warriors	4	0	3	0	1	2

Champions

== Fixtures ==
=== 1st match ===
4 May 2015

Northern Knights (H); 208 (49.2 overs)	v	North West Warriors; 105 (34.3 overs)
James Shannon 46 (48); Andrew McBrine 2/24 (10 overs)		Stuart Thompson 21 (25); Gary Kidd 4/26 (9.3 overs)

Northern Knights won by 103 runs
Stormont, Belfast
Umpires: Noel McCarey and Alan Neill

- North West Warriors won the toss and elected to field
- * Points: Northern Knights 5, North West Warriors 0.

=== 2nd match ===
17 May 2015

Northern Knights; 182/5 (39 overs)	v	North West Warriors (H); 164/8 (35 overs)
Rassie van der Dussen 93 (97); Stuart Thompson 2/49 (8 overs)		Craig Averill 36 (73); Andrew White 2/22 (5 overs)

Northern Knights won by 3 runs (DLS method)
Lodge Road, Coleraine, Coleraine
Umpires: Roland Black and Noel Dunn

- North West Warriors won the toss and elected to field.
- Northern Knights innings was reduced to 39 overs, North West Warriors target was 168 runs in 35 overs.
- Points: North West Warriors 0, Northern Knights 4.

=== 3rd match ===
14 June 2015

North West Warriors; 211 (41.4 overs)	v	Leinster Lightning (H); 215/4 (30.1 overs)
Gary McClintock 62 (64); Max Sorensen 4/44 (8 overs)		Dominick Joyce 86 (71); Graeme McCarter 2/37 (5 overs)

Leinster Lightning won by 6 wickets
Observatory Lane, Dublin
Umpires: Sameer Dutt and Paul Reynolds

- North West Warriors won the toss and elected to bat.
- * Points: North West Warriors 0, Leinster Lightning 5.

=== 4th match ===
2 August 2015

Leinster Lightning (H); 320 (49.5 overs)	v	Northern Knights; 162 (33.5 overs)
John Anderson 76 (83); Shane Getkate 4/48 (6.5 overs)		Andrew White 57 (84); Eddie Richardson (cricketer) 3/26 (7 overs)

Leinster Lightning won by 158 runs
Anglesea Road Cricket Ground, Dublin
Umpires: Gordon Black and Sameer Dutt

- Northern Knights won the toss and elected to field.
- * Points: Leinster Lightning 5, Northern Knights 0.

=== 5th match ===
9 August 2015

Leinster Lightning; 217 (49.5 overs)	v	Northern Knights (H); 138 (35.4 overs)
E Delany 48 (51); Andrew White 4/44 (9 overs)		Rassie van der Dussen 22 (38); John Mooney 4/25 (6 overs)

Leinster Lightning won by 79 runs
The Lawn, Waringstown
Umpires: Jareth McCready and Alan Neill

- Leinster Lightning won the toss and elected to bat.
- * Points: Leinster Lightning 5, Northern Knights 0.

=== 6th match ===
30 August 2015

North West Warriors (H)	v	Leinster Lightning

Match abandoned.
New Strabane Park, Strabane

- No toss contested.
- * Points: North West Warriors 2, Leinster Lightning 2.
