= Irish cricket team in Kenya in 2011–12 =

	Kenya	Ireland
- Dates: 12 February – 24 February 2012
Captains	Collins Obuya	William Porterfield

One Day International series
- Results: 2-match series drawn 1–1
Most runs	Tanmay Mishra (72)	Ed Joyce (91)
Most wickets	Hiren Varaiya (4); Shem Ngoche (4)	George Dockrell (3)

Twenty20 International series
- Results: Ireland won the 3-match series 3–0
Most runs	Tanmay Mishra (84)	Paul Stirling (77)
Most wickets	Shem Ngoche (4)	George Dockrell (6)

The Ireland cricket team toured Kenya in February 2012. They played an Intercontinental Cup match, two Intercontinental Cup ODIs and two Twenty20 Internationals against Kenya.

== Background ==
In early January 2012, it was reported at Ireland's tour to Kenya was in doubt due to security concerns at their Mombasa venue. These concerns arose with Mombasa being just 150 miles from the volatile Somali border, where recent high-profile kidnappings and attacks have taken place. Cricket Ireland, liaising with the International Cricket Council, requested that the matches held at Mombasa be moved if their players security could not be guaranteed. However Cricket Kenya drew up sufficient security plans to allow the matches to take place at Mombasa.

== Squads ==
Kenya	Ireland
Collins Obuya (c); Morris Ouma (wk); Duncan Allan; Irfan Karim; Tanmay Mishra; Rakep Patel; Ragheb Aga; Nehemiah Odhiambo; Nelson Odhiambo; Hiren Varaiya; Shem Ngoche; Alex Obanda; David Obuya; Elijah Otieno; Alfred Luseno	William Porterfield (c); Gary Wilson (wk); Alex Cusack; George Dockrell; Trent Johnston; Nigel Jones; Ed Joyce; John Mooney; Rory McCann; Kevin O'Brien; Andrew Poynter; Boyd Rankin; James Shannon; Max Sorensen; Paul Stirling; Albert van der Merwe; Andrew White

== Intercontinental Cup Match ==
12–13 February 2012
Scorecard

Ireland	v	Kenya
75 all out (33.5 overs); Ed Joyce 26 (53); Hiren Varaiya 6/22 (10 overs)		109 all out (35.1 overs); Ragheb Aga 46 (73); George Dockrell 5/37 (13 overs)
152 all out (49 overs); Ed Joyce 54 (64); Hiren Varaiya 6/51 (22 overs)		108 all out (47.2 overs); Nelson Odhiambo 32 (102); Albert van der Merwe 6/27 (18.2 overs)

Ireland won by 10 runs
Mombasa Sports Club Ground, Mombasa
Umpires: David Odhiambo (Ken) and Russell Tiffin (Zim)

- Ireland won the toss and elected to bat
- Points: Kenya 6; Ireland 14

== ODI Series ==
=== 1st ODI ===
18 February
Scorecard

Ireland; 200 (47.3 overs)	v	Kenya; 201/3 (42.4 overs)
Paul Stirling 46 (44); Collins Obuya 3/24 (6 overs)		Tanmay Mishra 70* (76); John Mooney 1/27 (7 overs)

Kenya won by 7 wickets
Mombasa Sports Club Ground, Mombasa
Umpires: David Odhiambo (Ken) and Russell Tiffin (Zim)
Player of the match: Tanmay Mishra (Ken)

- Ireland won the toss and elected to bat.
- Points: Kenya 2, Ireland 0.

=== 2nd ODI ===
20 February
Scorecard

Ireland; 237/9 (50 overs)	v	Kenya; 120 (35.1 overs)
Ed Joyce 88 (125); Hiren Varaiya 3/46 (10 overs)		Shem Ngoche 28 (37); Alex Cusack 2/13 (5 overs)

Ireland won by 117 runs
Mombasa Sports Club Ground, Mombasa
Umpires: Shaun George (RSA) & Russell Tiffin (Zim)
Player of the match: Ed Joyce (Ire)

- Ireland won the toss and elected to bat.
- Points: Ireland 2, Kenya 0.

== Twenty20 Series ==
=== 1st T20I ===
22 February
Scorecard

Kenya; 107 all out (20 overs)	v	Ireland; 109/4 (15.3 overs)
Tanmay Mishra 34 (30); George Dockrell 3/15 (4 overs)		Kevin O'Brien 30 (36); James Ngoche 1/7 (3 overs)

Ireland won by 6 wickets
Mombasa Sports Club Ground, Mombasa
Umpires: Shaun George (RSA) and David Odhiambo (Ken)
Player of the match: George Dockrell (Ire)

- Ireland won the toss and elected to field.

=== 2nd T20I ===
23 February
Scorecard

Kenya; 131/7 (20 overs)	v	Ireland; 132/2 (17.3 overs)
David Obuya 28 (25); Paul Stirling 2/21 (4 overs)		Paul Stirling 65* (52); Ragheb Aga 1/10 (1 over)

Ireland won by 8 wickets
Mombasa Sports Club Ground, Mombasa
Umpires: Shaun George (RSA) and David Odhiambo (Ken)
Player of the match: Paul Stirling (Ire)

- Kenya won the toss and elected to bat.

=== 3rd T20I ===
24 February
Scorecard

Ireland; 107/9 (20 overs)	v	Kenya; 105/7 (20 overs)
Ed Joyce 38 (46); Shem Ngoche 4/14 (3 overs)		Collins Obuya 42 (38); George Dockrell 2/13 (4 overs)

Ireland won by 2 runs
Mombasa Sports Club Ground, Mombasa
Umpires: Shaun George (RSA) and David Odhiambo (Ken)
Player of the match: Shem Ngoche (Ken)

- Ireland won the toss and elected to bat.
