= Inter-Provincial Championship =

Four-day cricket tournament in Ireland

- Countries: Ireland
- Administrator: Cricket Ireland
- Format: First-class cricket (from 2017 onwards)
- First edition: 2013
- Latest edition: 2019
- Tournament format: Double round-robin
- Number of teams: 3
- Current champion: North West Warriors
- Most successful: Leinster Lightning (5 titles)
- Most runs: John Anderson (472)
- Most wickets: Max Sorensen (32)
- Website: http://cricketireland.ie
- 2020 Inter-Provincial Championship

The Inter-Provincial Championship was an annual three-day cricket tournament in Ireland, played between regional teams drawn from three of Ireland's five provincial unions. It paralleled first-class cricket tournaments in other countries such as the County Championship of England and the Sheffield Shield of Australia. The tournament was held for the first time in 2013 across venues in Ireland. It was last held in 2019.

Up to and including the 2016 tournament, the matches were not given first-class status. However, at an International Cricket Council (ICC) meeting in October 2016, first-class status was awarded to all future matches, starting with the 2017 tournament.

== History ==
=== Background ===
The Ireland cricket team have had huge success recently on the international level which has boosted the popularity of the game in the country. They had earned the reputation of being giant killers after upsetting teams like Pakistan and Bangladesh (2007 Cricket World Cup), and England (2011 Cricket World Cup). Their good performances in major international tournaments meant that Cricket Ireland openly started bidding for Test match status to the International Cricket Council. Nevertheless, one of the main stumbling roadblocks for Ireland getting to play the pinnacle of the game was a lack of a first-class cricket infrastructure at home, amongst other things. As early as August 2011, Cricket Ireland announced plans of a domestic first-class tournament. In January 2012, Cricket Ireland announced the ambitious 'Vision 2020' plan which announced the establishment of a first-class structure by 2015 and achievement of Test status by 2020. It also began work on a cricket academy to find talented players across the country and improving grass-roots cricket in the country. For the first time professional contacts, with central, A, B, and C were established. Plans for Test status were established partly to stem the flow of their star cricketers moving away to England in hope of playing Test cricket such as Ed Joyce, Eoin Morgan and Boyd Rankin. According to Richard Holdsworth in an interview with Setanta Sports, CI are pleased with the strategic progress that had been made as of November 2012. In December 2012, Ireland got a $1.5m boost as increased funding from the ICC to establish elite domestic competitions in the country.

=== Hiatus and plans for return of first-class cricket ===
The Inter-Provincial Championship has not been held since 2019, and as of 2025 there are still no specific plans for its revival in the original 2013-2019 format. The 2020 competition was originally scheduled to have only half of the regular fixtures from previous editions before being indefinitely postponed due to the Covid-19 pandemic with Cricket Ireland confirming in February 2021 that there would be no first-class competition in 2021.

In July 2024, Cricket Ireland announced the launch of an interim domestic first-class cricket fixture titled the "Emerald Challenge". The match was to be of four days in duration (in contrast to the typical three days of the old Inter-Provincial Championship) and was to be contested by two quasi-franchise teams, the Raiders and the Strikers, composed of the top 26 players in Ireland. The match would also serve as preparation for the upcoming test against Zimbabwe that was to be held in Belfast in late July 2024.

Following the conclusion of the Emerald Challenge match, Cricket Ireland launched a new Strategic Plan in August 2024 which listed as one of its desired outcomes the reintroduction of first-class cricket by 2025 and at the provincial level by 2027. The Emerald Challenge match was held again in May 2026.

== Format ==
The Inter-Provincial Championship was played in a double round-robin format, with each team playing each other twice, once at home and once away.

=== Points summary ===
Points were scored as follows:

- Win – 16 points
- Draw – 3 points
- Tie – 8 points
- Batting bonus points – 1 point for scoring 150, 200, 250 and 300 runs
- Bowling bonus points – 1 points for taking 3, 5, 7 and 9 wickets
- Bonus points only apply for the first 100 overs of each team's first innings
- Over rate penalties also apply on a match by match basis for teams who fail to bowl their overs at the required rate

== Teams ==
Three of Ireland's five cricket unions take part in the Inter-Provincial Series; Munster Cricket Union and Connacht Cricket Union do not participate.

In the six years of its existence, the competition had been dominated by Leinster Lightning, winning the first five titles, including the 2017 competition, the first one treated as a first-class competition. In 2018, North West Warriors finally broke the Leinster stranglehold, winning their first Championship. In July 2020, Danish cricketer Freddie Klokker suggested that a European XI team could play in the competition, to give more experience to European cricketers playing in the longer format of the game.

Team	First season	Titles	First-class titles	Most recent 2019
Leinster Lightning	2013	6	2	1st
North West Warriors	2013	1	1	3rd
Northern Knights	2013	0	0	2nd

== Competition placings ==
=== 2013 to present ===
Season	Winner	Second	Third
2013	Leinster Lightning	Northern Knights	North West Warriors
2014	Leinster Lightning	Northern Knights	North West Warriors
2015	Leinster Lightning	North West Warriors	Northern Knights
2016	Leinster Lightning	Northern Knights	North West Warriors
2017	Leinster Lightning	North West Warriors	Northern Knights
2018	North West Warriors	Leinster Lightning	Northern Knights
2019	Leinster Lightning	Northern Knights	North West Warriors
2020	Not held due to the COVID-19 pandemic		
2021	Not held due to the COVID-19 pandemic		
2022	Not held due to the COVID-19 pandemic		
2023	Not held		
2024	Not held		
2025	Not held		

== All-time records ==
(All records correct to end of 2018 season)

=== Team records ===
==== Highest innings totals ====
- First Class cricket only

Score	Team	Opps	Venue	Date
509/9d	North West Warriors	Leinster Lightning	Malahide	1 May 2018
460/9	North West Warriors	Leinster Lightning	Bready CC	20 June 2018
448/7	Leinster Lightning	Northern Knights	Malahide	4 September 2018
446	North West Warriors	Northern Knights	Comber Cricket Ground	2 July 2018
440/9d	Northern Knights	Leinster Lightning	Malahide	4 September 2018

=== Lowest completed innings totals ===
Score	Team	Opps	Venue	Date
105	North West Warriors	Leinster Lightning	Bready CC	20–22 May 2014
116	North West Warriors	Northern Knights	Eglinton CC	4–6 June 2013
119	Northern Knights	North West Warriors	Eglinton CC	26–28 August 2014
123	Northern Knights	Leinster Lightning	College Park	25–27 June 2013

=== Highest scores in the fourth innings of the match ===
Score	Team	Opps	Venue	Date	Result
227	North West Warriors	Leinster Lightning	Malahide	1–3 July 2014	Lost by 65 runs
224	Northern Knights	North West Warriors	Eglinton CC	26–28 August 2014	Lost by 44 runs
176	Northern Knights	Leinster Lightning	College Park	17–19 June 2014	Lost by 157 runs
160/7	Northern Knights	North West Warriors	Eglinton CC	4–6 June 2013	Won by 3 wickets
157/2	Northern Knights	North West Warriors	Stormont	3–5 June 2014	Won by 8 wickets

=== Most career runs ===
- First Class cricket only

Runs	Innings	Player	Team
674	14	James McCollum	Northern Knights
552	11	James Shannon	Northern Knights
489	10	Niall O'Brien	North West Warriors
452	10	Jack Tector	Leinster Lightning
381	7	Ed Joyce	Leinster Lightning
358	8	Andrew Balbirnie	Leinster Lightning

=== Highest individual scores ===
Score	Player	For	Opps	Venue	Date
247*	Nick Larkin	Northern Knights	Leinster Lightning	Waringstown CC	27–29 August 2013
131	Craig Ervine	Northern Knights	Leinster Lightning	Waringstown CC	12–14 August 2014
113	Andrew Poynter	Leinster Lightning	Northern Knights	Waringstown CC	27–29 August 2013

=== Most runs scored in a season ===
- First Class cricket only

Runs	Innings	Player	Team	Season
458	7	William Porterfield	North West Warriors	2018
446	7	James Shannon	Northern Knights	2017
442	7	James McCollum	Northern Knights	2018

=== Most career wickets ===
- First Class cricket only

Wickets	Matches	Player	Team
31	8	David Scanlon	North West Warriors
30	7	George Dockrell	Leinster Lightning
30	7	Craig Young	North West Warriors
24	7	Peter Chase	Leinster Lightning

=== Best bowling in an innings ===
Bowling	Player	Team	Opps	Venue	Date
7/107	James Cameron-Dow	Northern Knights	North West Warriors	Eglinton CC	26–28 August 2014
6/55	Tabish Khan	North-West Warriors	Northern Knights	Stormont	3–5 June 2014
5/37	Craig Young	North West Warriors	Leinster Lightning	Bready CC	20–22 May 2014
5/124	James Cameron-Dow	Northern Knights	Leinster Lightning	Waringstown CC	27–29 August 2013

=== Most wickets in a season ===
- First Class cricket only

Wickets	Average	Player	Team	Season
22	13.09	George Dockrell	Leinster Lightning	2017
19	19.68	David Scanlon	North West Warriors	2018

=== Highest partnerships for each wicket ===
Wicket	P/Ship	Player 1	Player 2	Team	Opps	Venue	Date
1st	169	Chris Dougherty	Nick Larkin	Northern Knights	Leinster Lightning	Waringstown CC	27–29 August 2013
2nd	169	Chris Dougherty	Craig Ervine	Northern Knights	North West Warriors	Osborne Park	30 July – 1 August 2013
3rd	87*	Craig Ervine	Andrew White	Northern Knights	North West Warriors	Stormont	3–5 June 2014
4th	192	Craig Ervine	Andrew White	Northern Knights	Leinster Lightning	Waringstown CC	12–14 August 2013
5th	100	John Anderson	Kevin O'Brien	Leinster Lightning	Northern Knights	College Park	25–27 June 2013
6th	76	Stuart Thompson	Andrew McBrine	North West Warriors	Northern Knights	Eglinton CC	26–28 August 2014
7th	62	Andrew McBrine	Jonathan Thompson	North West Warriors	Leinster Lightning	Malahide CC	1–3 July 2014
8th	104	Andrew Poynter	Tyrone Kane	Leinster Lightning	Northern Knights	Waringstown CC	27–29 August 2013
9th	48*	Tyrone Kane	Max Sorensen	Leinster Lightning	Northern Knights	Waringstown CC	27–29 August 2013
10th	134	Max Sorensen	Albert van der Merwe	Leinster Lightning	North West Warriors	Malahide CC	1–3 July 2014

== Seasons ==
- 2013 Inter-Provincial Championship
- 2014 Inter-Provincial Championship
- 2015 Inter-Provincial Championship
- 2016 Inter-Provincial Championship

First Class status granted in 2017

- 2017 Inter-Provincial Championship
- 2018 Inter-Provincial Championship
- 2019 Inter-Provincial Championship

== See also ==
- Cricket in Ireland
- History of cricket
- Inter-Provincial Cup
- Inter-Provincial Trophy
- Inter-Provincial T20 Festival
