= 2008 Associates Tri-Series in Scotland =

- Date: 1 July 2008 – 3 July 2008
- Location: Scotland
- Result: New Zealand win
Teams
Ireland	New Zealand	Scotland
Captains
Kyle McCallan	Daniel Vettori	Ryan Watson
Most runs
Gary Wilson 60 Ryan Haire 56 Kyle McCallan 49	Brendon McCullum 188; Hamish Marshall 161; Ross Taylor 120	Gavin Hamilton 121; Colin Smith 70; Qasim Sheikh 41
Most wickets
Andrew White 2 Thinus Fourie & Phil Eaglestone & Reinhardt Strydom & Kyle McCallan & Andre Botha 1	Jacob Oram & Grant Elliott 4 Tim Southee & Michael Mason 3	Dewald Nel 5 John Blain 3 Gordon Goudie 2

A tri-series in Scotland took place between 1 July and 3 July involving New Zealand, Ireland and Scotland. On 1 July, New Zealand beat Ireland by 290 runs. This became a new world record for the biggest margin of victory by runs. The previous world record was India's 257 run drubbing of Bermuda in the 2007 Cricket World Cup.

== Points table ==
Group Stage
Pos	Team	Pld	W	L	T	NR	Pts
1	New Zealand	2	2	0	0	0	4
2	Scotland	2	1	1	0	0	2
3	Ireland	2	0	2	0	0	0

Source: Cricinfo

== Tri-Series ==
=== 1st match ===
1 July 2008
10:45
Scorecard

New Zealand; 402/2 (50 overs)	v	Ireland; 112 (28.4 overs)
Brendon McCullum 166 (135); Phil Eaglestone 1/60 (7 overs)		Peter Connell 22* (26); Tim Southee 3/23 (6 overs)

New Zealand won by 290 runs
Mannofield Park, Aberdeen, Scotland
Umpires: Paul Baldwin (Ger) and Steve Davis (Aus)

- Ireland won the toss and elected to field.
- Andrew Poynter, Peter Connell, Paul Stirling and Ryan Haire (all Ire) made their ODI debut.
- Ryan Haire (Ire) made his List A debut.
- Phil Eaglestone (Ire) play his only ODI match.
- James Marshall (NZ) played his final ODI match.
- Brendon McCullum and James Marshall (both NZ) scored their maiden ODI centuries.
- New Zealand's 290 run win over Ireland is the ODI record for the biggest margin of victory by runs.
- Points: New Zealand 2, Ireland 0

=== 2nd match ===
2 July 2008
10:45
Scorecard

Ireland; 210/8 (50 overs)	v	Scotland; 211/5 (47.3 overs)
Ryan Haire 54 (63); Dewald Nel 4/25 (9 overs)		Gavin Hamilton 115 (150); Andrew White 2/17 (4.3 overs)

Scotland won by 5 wickets
Mannofield Park, Aberdeen, Scotland
Umpires: Paul Baldwin (Ger) and Steve Davis (Aus)

- Ireland won the toss and elected to bat.
- Gordon Goudie, Qasim Sheikh and Richie Berrington (all Sco) made their ODI debut.
- Gavin Hamilton (Sco) scored is maiden ODI century.
- Points: Scotland 2, Ireland 0

=== 3rd match ===
3 July 2008
10:45
Scorecard

Scotland; 101 (33.2 overs)	v	New Zealand; 102/2 (14.4 overs)
Qasim Sheikh 18 (43); Jacob Oram 3/13 (6 overs)		Ross Taylor 61* (41); Dewald Nel 1/34 (6 overs)

New Zealand won by 8 wickets
Mannofield Park, Aberdeen, Scotland
Umpires: Paul Baldwin (Ger) and Steve Davis (Aus)

- New Zealand won the toss and elected to field.
- Points: New Zealand 2, Scotland 0
