= Pakistani cricket team in Ireland in 2011 =

Pakistan cricket team in Ireland in 2011
- Date: 27–30 May 2011
- Location: Civil Service Cricket Club Ground, Belfast
- Result: Pakistan won the 2-match series 2–0
Teams
- Ireland: Pakistan
Captains
- William Porterfield: Misbah-ul-Haq
Most runs
- Paul Stirling (148): Younis Khan (70)
Most wickets
- Alex Cusack (4): Saeed Ajmal (7)

The Pakistan national cricket team visited Ireland in May 2011 to play two One Day Internationals. The series was played from 27 to 30 May 2011. Misbah-ul-Haq was the captain of the Pakistanti team while William Porterfield was the captain of the Irish team. Both the matches were won by Pakistan. Paul Stirling of the Irish team scored the maximum number of runs in the series while Saeed Ajmal of Pakistan took 7 wickets in the series.

== Squads ==
Pakistan	Ireland
Misbah-ul-Haq (c); Abdur Rehman; Asad Shafiq; Azhar Ali; Hammad Azam; Junaid Khan; Mohammad Hafeez; Mohammad Salman; Saeed Ajmal; Shahid Afridi; Tanvir Ahmed; Taufeeq Umar; Umar Akmal; Umar Gul; Wahab Riaz; Younis Khan	William Porterfield (c); Alex Cusack; Trent Johnston; Nigel Jones; Ed Joyce; Niall McDonnell; John Mooney; Kevin O'Brien; Niall O'Brien; Boyd Rankin; Albert van der Merwe; Andrew White; Gary Wilson

== ODI series ==
=== 1st ODI ===
28 May 2011
Scorecard

Ireland; 96 (20 overs)	v	Pakistan; 97/3 (27.3 overs)
Paul Stirling 39 (22); Junaid Khan 4/12 (5 overs)		Mohammad Hafeez 52 (84); Alex Cusack 3/13 (5 overs)

Pakistan won by 7 wickets (D/L)
Civil Service Cricket Club Ground, Stormont, Belfast
Umpires: Ian Gould (Eng) and Mark Hawthorne (Ire)
Player of the match: Junaid Khan (Pak)

- Pakistan won the toss and elected to field.
- Match reduced to 38 overs per side due to rain. Further rain in Ireland's innings reduced match to 36 overs per side, and adjusted Pakistan's target to 95 runs from 36 overs.

=== 2nd ODI ===
30 May 2011
Scorecard

Ireland; 238/8 (50 overs)	v	Pakistan; 242/5 (48.4 overs)
Paul Stirling 109 (107); Saeed Ajmal 4/35 (10 overs)		Younis Khan 64 (74); Boyd Rankin 1/29 (9 overs)

Pakistan won by 5 wickets
Civil Service Cricket Club Ground, Belfast
Umpires: Ian Gould (Eng) & Mark Hawthorne (Ire)
Player of the match: Paul Stirling (Ire)

- Ireland won the toss and elected to bat.
