= Alan Hughes (cricketer) =

Irish cricketer (born 1951)

Personal information
- Full name: Alan John Hughes
- Born: 4 April 1951 (age 75); Dublin, Ireland
- Batting: Right-handed
- Bowling: Right-arm medium
- Relatives: Patrick Hughes (cousin)

Domestic team information
- Years: Team
- 1980: Ireland

Career statistics
Competition	List A
Matches	1
Runs scored	0
Batting average	0.00
100s/50s	–/–
Top score	0
Balls bowled	18
Wickets	0
Bowling average	–
5 wickets in innings	–
10 wickets in match	–
Best bowling	–
Catches/stumpings	–/–
- Source: Cricinfo, 19 October 2021

Alan John Hughes (born 4 April 1951) is an Irish former cricketer. A right-handed batsman and right-arm medium pace bowler, he played five times for the Ireland cricket team between 1979 and 1982, including one List A match. He made his debut for Ireland against Worcestershire in August 1979. He took 4/95 in the Worcestershire first innings, his best bowling performance for Ireland. He played his only List A match the following year against Middlesex at Lord's. He appeared three more times for Ireland: against Canada in June 1981, India in May 1982 and the MCC in June 1982. His only run for Ireland came in the match against Canada. In all matches for Ireland, he took nine wickets at an average of 26.56. His cousin Patrick also represented Ireland at cricket. Hughes was president of Malahide Cricket Club and oversaw the club's hosting of its first One Day International between Ireland and England in 2013.
