= English cricket team in Ireland in 2013 =

	England	Ireland
- Date: 3 September 2013
Captains	Eoin Morgan	William Porterfield

One Day International series
- Results: England won the 1-match series 1–0
Most runs	Eoin Morgan (124)	William Porterfield (112)
Most wickets	Boyd Rankin (4)	Tim Murtagh (3)
- Player of the series: Eoin Morgan (Eng)

The England cricket team visited Ireland on 3 September 2013 for a one-match One Day International series against the Ireland cricket team at Malahide Cricket Club Ground, Dublin. The match served as a warm-up for England ahead of their five-match ODI series against Australia later in the month. After Ireland opener William Porterfield scored 112 to get the hosts to a total of 269/7, England responded with unbeaten centuries from captain Eoin Morgan (playing against his country of origin) and Ravi Bopara to win the match by 6 wickets.

== Squads ==
Ireland	England
William Porterfield (c); George Dockrell; Trent Johnston; Ed Joyce; John Mooney; Tim Murtagh; Kevin O'Brien; Niall O'Brien (wk); Eddie Richardson; Max Sorensen; Paul Stirling; Andrew White; Gary Wilson (wk)	Eoin Morgan (c); Gary Ballance; Ravi Bopara; Danny Briggs; Jos Buttler (wk); Michael Carberry; Steven Finn; Chris Jordan; Jamie Overton; Boyd Rankin; Ben Stokes; James Taylor; James Tredwell; Luke Wright

== ODI series ==
=== Only ODI ===
3 September 2013
10:30
Scorecard

Ireland; 269/7 (50 overs)	v	England; 274/4 (43 overs)
William Porterfield 112 (142); Boyd Rankin 4/46 (9 overs)		Eoin Morgan 124* (106); Tim Murtagh 3/33 (10 overs)

England won by 6 wickets
The Village, Malahide, Dublin
Umpires: Mark Hawthorne (Ire) and Ruchira Palliyaguru (SL)
Player of the match: Eoin Morgan (Eng)

- England won the toss and elected to field.
- This was the first One Day International to be held at Malahide.
- Eoin Morgan and Ravi Bopara's 226-run stand was the highest fifth-wicket partnership in ODI cricket.
- Gary Ballance, Michael Carberry (both Eng) and Max Sorensen (Ire) made their ODI debuts.
