= 2018 Inter-Provincial Championship =

Cricket tournament

- Dates: 1 May 2018 – 6 September 2018
- Administrator: Cricket Ireland
- Cricket format: First-class
- Tournament format: Round-robin
- Champions: North West Warriors (1st title)
- Participants: 3
- Matches: 6
- Most runs: William Porterfield (458)
- Most wickets: David Scanlon (19)

The 2018 Inter-Provincial Championship was the sixth edition of the Inter-Provincial Championship, a first-class cricket competition played in Ireland. It was held from 1 May to 6 September 2018. It was the second edition of the competition to be played with first-class status. Leinster Lightning were the defending champions. The venue for the opening fixture, originally scheduled to take place at Oak Hill Cricket Club Ground, was moved to Pembroke Cricket Club, due to poor weather.

Seventeen of Ireland's international players took part in the opening fixture of the tournament, ahead of Ireland's first Test match, which was played against Pakistan on 11 May 2018.

North West Warriors won the tournament, following the conclusion of the fifth match of the competition. They beat Northern Knights by 140 runs to give them an unassailable lead. It was the first time that a side other than Leinster Lightning had won the tournament.

== Points table ==
Team	Pld	W	L	D	Pts
North West Warriors	4	2	0	2	64
Leinster Lightning	4	1	0	3	49
Northern Knights	4	0	3	1	24

Champions

== Fixtures ==
=== 1st match ===
1–3 May 2018
Scorecard

North West Warriors	v	Leinster Lightning (H)
509/9d (137 overs); Niall O'Brien 165 (294); George Dockrell 3/120 (29 overs)		286 (86 overs); Andrew Balbirnie 114* (238); Craig Young 3/49 (17 overs)
		227/7 (76 overs) (f/o); Jack Tector 53 (95); David Scanlon 2/39 (14 overs)

Match drawn
Pembroke Cricket Club, Dublin
Umpires: Paul Reynolds and Azam Baig

- Leinster Lightning won the toss and elected to field.
- Stuart Thompson (North West Warriors) scored his maiden first-class century.
- Points: North West Warriors 11, Leinster Lightning 6.

=== 2nd match ===
29–31 May 2018
Scorecard

Northern Knights	v	Leinster Lightning (H)
263 (87.3 overs); James McCollum 87 (190); Peter Chase 3/38 (11.3 overs)		268 (95.4 overs); John Anderson 66 (150); Harry Tector 3/28 (11 overs)
272/5d (62 overs); James McCollum 84 (134); Simi Singh 3/39 (12 overs)		268/5 (59 overs); John Anderson 123* (164); James Cameron-Dow 2/72 (22)

Leinster Lightning won by 5 wickets
The Green, Comber
Umpires: Jareth McCready and Azam Baig

- Northern Knights won the toss and elected to bat.
- Marc Ellison, Harry Tector, Neil Rock, James Cameron-Dow, James Magee (Northern Knights), Jarred Barnes (Leinster Lightning) all made their first-class debuts.
- Points: Leinster Lightning 23, Northern Knights 7.

=== 3rd match ===
20–22 June 2018
Scorecard

North West Warriors (H)	v	Leinster Lightning
80 (39 overs); David Rankin 16 (41); Peter Chase 5/24 (11 overs)		273 (70.4 overs); George Dockrell 92 (126); David Scanlon 4/70 (18.4 overs)
460/9 (175 overs); William Porterfield 207 (442); Andrew Balbirnie 3/50 (23 overs)

Match drawn
Bready Cricket Club Ground, Bready
Umpires: Graeme McCrea and Steve Wood

- Leinster Lightning won the toss and elected to field.
- Graham Kennedy (North West Warriors), Stephen Doheny and Josh Little (Leinster Lightning) all made their first-class debuts.
- Points: Leinster Lightning 10, North West Warriors 7.

=== 4th match ===
2–4 July 2018
Scorecard

Northern Knights	v	North West Warriors (H)
250 (81.3 overs); James McCollum 116 (230); Craig Young 3/62 (19 overs)		446 (128.1 overs); Andy McBrine 77 (178); James Cameron-Dow 5/101 (35 overs)
209 (87.5 overs); Christopher Dougherty 74 (181); Craig Young 5/60 (21.5 overs)		15/0 (1.3 overs); William Porterfield 4* (6)

North West Warriors won by 10 wickets
The Green, Comber
Umpires: Alan Neill and Philip Thompson

- Northern Knights won the toss and elected to bat first.
- Points: North West Warriors 24, Northern Knights 6.

=== 5th match ===
17–19 July 2018
Scorecard

North West Warriors	v	Northern Knights (H)
226 (65.5 overs); Niall O'Brien 45 (64); James McCollum 5/32 (10 overs)		188 (62.2 overs); Marc Ellison 65 (136); David Scanlon 5/63 (17 overs)
303/7d (64 overs); William Porterfield 152 (174); Harry Tector 4/70 (18 overs)		201 (57.2 overs); James McCollum 48 (65); Andy McBrine 4/35 (16 overs)

North West Warriors won by 140 runs
Bready Cricket Club Ground, Bready
Umpires: Graeme McCrea and Michael Foster

- Northern Knights won the toss and elected to field.
- Aaron Wright and Matthew McCord (Northern Knights) both made their first-class debuts.
- Points: North West Warriors 22, Northern Knights 5.

=== 6th match ===
4–6 September 2018
Scorecard

Northern Knights	v	Leinster Lightning (H)
440/9d (109.3 overs); James McCollum 93 (145); Simi Singh 3/75 (28 overs)		448/7 (125 overs); Jack Tector 87 (180); James Cameron-Dow 2/92 (30 overs)

Match drawn
Malahide Cricket Club Ground, Malahide
Umpires: Jonathan Kennedy and Paul Reynolds

- Northern Knights won the toss and elected to bat.
