= Alan Nelson (cricketer) =

Irish cricketer

Personal information
- Full name: Alan Norris Nelson
- Born: 22 November 1965 (age 60); Banbridge, County Down, Northern Ireland
- Batting: Right-handed
- Bowling: Right-arm fast-medium
- Relatives: Noel Nelson (brother); Lee Nelson (nephew)

International information
- National side: Ireland

Domestic team information
- Years: Team
- 1988–1993: Ireland

Career statistics
Competition	First-class	List A
Matches	4	6
Runs scored	56	20
Batting average	18.66	10.00
100s/50s	0/0	0/0
Top score	23	9*
Balls bowled	750	318
Wickets	14	4
Bowling average	22.57	48.50
5 wickets in innings	1	0
10 wickets in match	0	0
Best bowling	5/27	2/19
Catches/stumpings	2/–	1/–
- Source: Cricinfo, 15 November 2011

Alan Norris Nelson (born 22 November 1965) is a former Irish cricketer. Nelson was a right-handed batsman who bowled right-arm fast-medium. He was born at Banbridge, County Down, Northern Ireland. He was educated at Banbridge Academy.

Nelson made his first-class debut for Ireland against Scotland in 1988. He made three further first-class appearances for Ireland between then and 1991, all of which came against Scotland. In his four first-class appearances, he took 14 wickets at an average of 22.57, with best figures of 5/27. With the bat, he scored 56 runs at an average of 18.66, with a high score of 23 not out. He made his List A debut for Ireland against Gloucestershire in the 1988 NatWest Trophy. He made five further List A appearances, the last of which came against Yorkshire in the 1993 NatWest Trophy. In his six List A matches, he took just 4 wickets at an average of 48.50, with best figures of 2/19. While with the bat, he scored 20 runs at an average of 10.00, with a high score of 9 not out. He also made six appearances for Ireland in the 1994 ICC Trophy in Kenya.

His brother, Noel, played a single first-class match for Ireland, while his son, Liam, has played Youth One Day Internationals for Ireland Under-19s. Outside of cricket, Nelson works as a despatch clerk.
