= Craig McKnight =

Scottish cricketer

Personal information
- Full name: Craig Thomas McKnight
- Born: 6 September 1969 (age 57); Bellshill, Lanarkshire, Scotland
- Batting: Left-handed
- Bowling: Slow left-arm orthodox

Domestic team information
- Years: Team
- 1990: Scotland

Career statistics
Competition	First-class
Matches	1
Runs scored	0
Batting average	0.00
100s/50s	–/–
Top score	0
Balls bowled	138
Wickets	3
Bowling average	24.00
5 wickets in innings	–
10 wickets in match	–
Best bowling	3/48
Catches/stumpings	1/–
- Source: Cricinfo, 27 July 2022

Craig Thomas McKnight (born 6 September 1969) is a Scottish former first-class cricketer.

McKnight was born in September 1969 at Bellshill, Lanarkshire. He was educated at Hutcheson's Grammar School, before matriculating to the University of Strathclyde. A club cricketer for Poloc Cricket Club, McKnight made a single appearance for Scotland in first-class cricket against Ireland at Edinburgh in 1990. Playing in the Scottish side as a slow left-arm orthodox bowler, he took the wickets of Mark Cohen, Alan Lewis and Noel Nelson in the Irish first innings, finishing the innings with figures of 3 for 48. In the Scottish first innings, he was dismissed without scoring by Garfield Harrison. Prior to his debut for Scotland, McKnight was associated with English county side Nottinghamshire, playing several second eleven matches for them.
