= 2019 Inter-Provincial Championship =

Cricket tournament

- Dates: 28 May 2019 – 29 August 2019
- Administrator: Cricket Ireland
- Cricket format: First-class
- Tournament format: Round-robin
- Champions: Leinster Lightning (6th title)
- Participants: 3
- Matches: 6
- Most runs: Simi Singh (204)
- Most wickets: Simi Singh (13)

The 2019 Inter-Provincial Championship, known for sponsorship reasons as the Test Triangle Inter-Provincial Championship, was the seventh edition of the Inter-Provincial Championship, a first-class cricket competition played in Ireland. It took place from 28 May to 29 August 2019. It was the third edition of the competition to be played with first-class status. North West Warriors were the defending champions.

The tournament was heavily affected by rain, with none of the games being completed. Only six days of play across the eighteen that were scheduled took place. Leinster Lightning were the eventual winners of the tournament.

== Points table ==
Team	Pld	W	L	D	NR	Pts
Leinster Lightning	4	0	0	4	0	40
Northern Knights	4	0	0	3	1	35
North West Warriors	4	0	0	3	1	33

Champions

== Fixtures ==
=== 1st match ===
28–30 May 2019
Scorecard

North West Warriors	v	Northern Knights (H)
234/7 (104 overs); Graham Kennedy 73* (176); Harry Tector 3/48 (23 overs)

Match drawn
The Green, Comber
Umpires: Roland Black and Alan Neill

- North West Warriors won the toss and elected to bat.
- No play was possible on days 2 and 3 due to rain.
- Kyle Magee (North West Warriors) made his first-class debut.
- Points: Northern Knights 9, North West Warriors 8.

=== 2nd match ===
17–19 June 2019
Scorecard

North West Warriors (H)	v	Leinster Lightning
135 (59.3 overs); William Porterfield 25 (48); Simi Singh 3/15 (12.3 overs)		154/5 (55.4 overs); Andy Balbirnie 50 (106); Craig Young 3/45 (13 overs)

Match drawn
Bready Cricket Club Ground, Bready
Umpires: Roland Black and Mark Hawthorne

- Leinster Lightning won the toss and elected to field.
- No play was possible on day 1 due to rain.
- No play was possible until after lunch on day 2 due to a wet outfield.
- Fionn Hand and Cormac McLoughlin-Gavin (Leinster Lightning) both made their first-class debuts.
- Points: Leinster Lightning 11, North West Warriors 0.

=== 3rd match ===
30 July–1 August 2019
Scorecard

Northern Knights	v	Leinster Lightning (H)
332 (106.5 overs); Harry Tector 146 (234); Simi Singh 3/24 (10.5 overs)		324/8d (76.3 overs); Simi Singh 100* (124); David Delany 3/63 (14 overs)
131 (60.5 overs); Gary Wilson 36 (67); Simi Singh 5/38 (25.5 overs)

Match drawn
Sydney Parade, Dublin
Umpires: Alan Neill and Mary Waldron

- Leinster Lightning won the toss and elected to field.
- Josh Manley (Northern Knights) made his first-class debut.
- Harry Tector (Northern Knights) scored his maiden century in first-class cricket.
- Points: Leinster Lightning 10, Northern Knights 10.

=== 4th match ===
6–8 August 2019
Scorecard

Northern Knights (H)	v	Leinster Lightning
150/4d (41.3 overs); James McCollum 44 (77); Kevin O'Brien 1/16 (5.4 overs)		217/7 (53.4 overs); Andrew Balbirnie 81 (118); David Delany 3/48 (11 overs)

Match drawn
Stormont, Belfast
Umpires: Roland Black and Mark Hawthorne

- Leinster Lightning won the toss and elected to field.
- Only 18.1 overs of play was possible across days 1 and 2 due to rain.
- Points: Northern Knights 10, Leinster Lightning 9.

=== 5th match ===
12–14 August 2019
Scorecard

Leinster Lightning (H)	v	North West Warriors
131 (45.4 overs); Simi Singh 29 (52); Craig Young 4/26 (12 overs)		168/9 (66 overs); William Porterfield 95* (192); Barry McCarthy 5/51 (19 overs)

Match drawn
North County Cricket Club, Balrothery
Umpires: Mark Hawthorne and Alan Neill

- Leinster Lightning won the toss and elected to bat.
- No play was possible on day 3 due to rain.
- Will Smale (North West Warriors) made his first-class debut.
- Points: Leinster Lightning 11, North West Warriors 10.

=== 6th match ===
27–29 August 2019
Scorecard

North West Warriors (H)	v	Northern Knights

Match abandoned
Bready Cricket Club Ground, Bready
Umpires: Roland Black and Deighton Butler

- No toss.
- No play was possible due to rain and a wet outfield.
- Potints: North West Warriors 6, Northern Knights 6.
