= Noel Nelson =

Irish cricketer

Personal information
- Full name: Noel Nelson
- Born: 13 April 1967 (age 59); Banbridge, Northern Ireland
- Batting: Right-handed
- Bowling: Right-arm medium
- Relatives: Alan Nelson (brother); Lee Nelson (nephew)

Domestic team information
- Years: Team
- 1990: Ireland

Career statistics
Competition	First-class
Matches	1
Runs scored	0
Batting average	0.00
100s/50s	0/0
Top score	0
Balls bowled	90
Wickets	0
Bowling average	–
5 wickets in innings	–
10 wickets in match	–
Best bowling	–
Catches/stumpings	1/–
- Source: Cricinfo, 21 October 2018

Noel Nelson (born 13 April 1967) is a former Irish first-class cricketer.

Nelson was born at Banbridge in County Down in April 1967, and was educated at Banbridge Academy. An all-rounder at club level, he played one first-class cricket match for Ireland against Scotland at Edinburgh in 1990. In a drawn match, Nelson batted once and was dismissed without scoring by Craig McKnight. He also bowled fifteen overs with his medium pace, but failed to take a wicket. He toured Zimbabwe in March 1991, playing six minor fixtures. Following this tour, he was not selected again for Ireland, beginning a career as an operations manager instead. His brother, Alan Nelson, also played first-class cricket for Ireland. More recently, his nephew, Lee Nelson, has played first-class cricket for the Northern Knights.
