= Rishi Chopra =

Irish cricketer (born 1995)

Personal information
- Born: 18 December 1995 (age 30)
- Source: Cricinfo, 6 July 2018

Rishi Chopra (born 18 December 1995) is an Irish cricketer. He made his Twenty20 debut for North West Warriors in the 2018 Inter-Provincial Trophy on 6 July 2018.
