= Nigel Thompson =

Irish cricketer

Personal information
- Full name: Nigel Ernest Thompson
- Born: 25 June 1964 (age 62); Derry, Northern Ireland
- Batting: Right-handed
- Bowling: Right-arm medium
- Relatives: Stuart Thompson (son)

Domestic team information
- Years: Team
- 1988–1991: Ireland

Career statistics
Competition	First-class	List A
Matches	3	2
Runs scored	79	26
Batting average	15.80	13.00
100s/50s	0/0	0/0
Top score	38	14
Balls bowled	381	144
Wickets	3	2
Bowling average	64.33	31.00
5 wickets in innings	0	0
10 wickets in match	0	–
Best bowling	2/67	1/30
Catches/stumpings	1/–	0/–
- Source: Cricinfo, 26 October 2018

Nigel Ernest Thompson (born 25 June 1964) is a former Irish first-class cricketer.

Thompson was born at Derry and educated at Limavady High School. Playing club cricket for several club teams in the North West, Thompson made his debut in first-class cricket for Ireland against Scotland at Dumfries in 1988. Thompson made two further appearances in first-class cricket for Ireland, both against Scotland in 1989 and 1991. He scored 79 runs in these matches and took 3 wickets. Thompson also played one-day List A cricket for Ireland on two occasions, the first occasion came in the 1989 NatWest Trophy against Derbyshire at Derby, while the second came against Middlesex in the 1991 NatWest Trophy at Dublin. He scored 26 runs in these two matches and took 2 wickets. Outside of cricket, he works as a manufacturing operator for DuPont. He is the father of the Ireland Test cricketer Stuart Thompson, who featured in Ireland's first ever Test match against Pakistan in 2018.
