= 2014 Irish cricket season =

In the 2014 Irish cricket season, Ireland hosted three international series, against Sri Lanka, Sri Lanka A and Scotland, losing the two against Sri Lankan teams, but beating Scotland. In domestic cricket, Leinster Lightning won two of the three competitions, while North-West Warriors won the other.

== International cricket ==
=== One Day International series against Sri Lanka ===
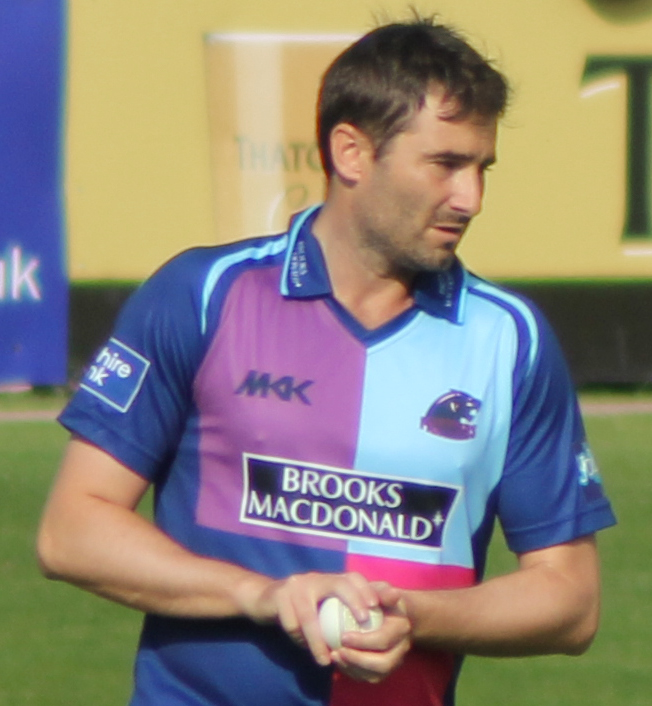
Tim Murtagh bowled well for Ireland against Sri Lanka in the first ODI.

Prior to their series against England, the Sri Lanka national cricket team visited Ireland in May to contest two ODIs, both hosted at Clontarf Cricket Club Ground in Dublin. In the first match, Ireland won the toss and invited Sri Lanka to bat first. Tim Murtagh was described as being "almost unplayable" by Ger Siggins of ESPNcricinfo, and the Irish bowling attack was generally praised for maintaining pressure on Sri Lanka, who were restricted to 219 for eight from their 50 overs. During their response, Ireland lost too many early wickets, struggling to 74 for seven. They were eventually dismissed for 140, giving Sri Lanka a 79 run victory. Ajantha Mendis was named man of the match for taking three wickets and conceding only 27 runs. The second ODI, two days later was abandoned without any play because of rain, granting Sri Lanka a 1–0 series victory.

=== List A series against Sri Lanka A ===
A couple of months after their series against Sri Lanka, Ireland were visited by Sri Lanka A, who played a three match "unofficial ODI" series, which were given List A status. The first two matches were played at Civil Service Cricket Club Ground in Belfast, while the third was scheduled for Lodge Road, Coleraine. Sri Lanka A lost the toss in the first match and were asked to bat first. After losing a wicket in the first over, Mahela Udawatte and Danushka Gunathilaka shared a 106-run partnership. Thereafter, the team regularly lost wickets and completed their innings 283 all out. In reply, Ireland never established a significant partnership, with only Stuart Poynter, who scored 109 runs, making a significant score, and Ireland lost by 28 runs. Sri Lanka A batted first again in the second match, and half-century scores for four of their first five batsmen helped to propel them to a score of 329 for eight. The captain, Ashan Priyanjan was the team's top-scorer, with 111 runs. Poynter opened the innings for Ireland, but was dismissed first ball, and his fellow opener, Andy Balbirnie, followed two overs later. Stuart Thompson scored a half-century, but five wickets from the leg-spinner Seekkuge Prasanna helped Sri Lanka A to a 107 runs victory. As in the ODI series, the final match was abandoned due to rain, so Sri Lanka A won the series 2–0.

=== One Day International series against Scotland ===
Late in the season, during September, Scotland travelled to Ireland to play three ODIs at the Malahide Cricket Club Ground in Dublin. The Irish squad was largely similar to that which faced Sri Lanka A, though John Mooney, Kevin O'Brien, George Dockrell and Max Sorensen returned to the squad. Ireland won the toss and chose to bowl first, and regularly took wickets to restrict Scotland to a total of 172. Craig Young became the ninth player to take five wickets during their ODI debut, to help bowl Scotland out after 40 overs and three balls. Ireland chased the target down easily, aided by a half-century from O'Brien, to win by seven wickets. Scotland fared better in the second match after once again being invited to bat first; an unbeaten century from Richie Berrington helped his side reach 221. O'Brien was Ireland's leading run-scorer again, with 67 runs, and despite losing a few wickets once O'Brien was dismissed, Ireland reached the target with over five overs to spare. Shortly before the third match of the series, an interview with Mooney was broadcast on RTÉ Sport, in which he spoke about his battle against depression which had forced him to take a break from international cricket. During the match, he was received a standing ovation for his score of 96, which held the Irish innings together, though they finished on a below-par score of 241. Scotland's off-spiiner, Majid Haq, collected five wickets in the innings. In their reply, Scotland lost the wicket of Matthew Cross in the second over, but a partnership of 182 between Calum MacLeod and Hamish Gardiner helped to seal their only victory of the series, with the former reaching his second ODI century.

== Domestic cricket ==
Leinster Lightning won the 2014 Inter-Provincial Championship for the second successive year, finishing with three wins and draw from their four matches. They also won the 50-over Inter-Provincial Cup, in which they won all four of their matches, but they finished as runners-up in the Twenty20 competition, with North-West Warriors winning the Inter-Provincial Trophy. North-West batsmen dominated the batting tables, as three of the four players to top 200 runs in the Championship; Craig Ervine scored the most, accruing 224. A North-West player also topped the bowled charts, James Cameron-Dow, though the three next best bowlers all played for Leinster.

The Irish Senior Cup and Alan Murray Twenty20 Cup finals were both contested between Clontarf and The Hills. The Hills finished as Senior Cup winners, claiming a nine-run victory, aided by half-centuries from Cormac McLoughlin and Michael Baumgart. In the Twenty20 competition, Clontarf took a more comprehensive win, scoring 142 runs, including 60 from Andrew Poynter, and then bowling The Hills out for 95.
