= 2020 Inter-Provincial Championship =

Cricket tournament

- Dates: 11 – 27 August 2020
- Administrator: Cricket Ireland
- Cricket format: First-class
- Tournament format: Round-robin
- Participants: 3
- Matches: 3

The 2020 Inter-Provincial Championship, known for sponsorship reasons as the Test Triangle Inter-Provincial Championship, was scheduled to be the eighth edition of the Inter-Provincial Championship, a first-class cricket competition played in Ireland. It was scheduled to take place from 2 to 27 August 2020. It would have been the fourth edition of the competition to be played with first-class status. The number of fixtures were halved from the previous year, with each team playing two matches instead of four. Leinster Lightning were the defending champions.

On 26 March 2020, Cricket Ireland confirmed that domestic competitions would be pushed back to 28 May 2020 at the earliest, due to the COVID-19 pandemic. Government restrictions prevented any cricket, including training, from starting before June 2020. The Irish government announced a provisional date of 20 July 2020 for a possible restart of sporting fixtures in the country. Plans of a possible start of domestic cricket in Ireland, with matches taking place during August and September, were looked at in July 2020. However, on 22 July 2020, Cricket Ireland confirmed that only the 20-over and 50-over tournaments would take place in 2020 due to the pandemic. In February 2021, Cricket Ireland confirmed that there would be no first-class competition in 2021, with the focus on limited overs cricket instead.
