= Patrick Hughes (cricketer) =

Irish cricketer and teacher (1943–2022)

Personal information
- Born: 10 April 1943; Blackrock, County Dublin, Leinster, Ireland
- Died: 19 February 2022 (aged 78)
- Batting: Right-handed
- Bowling: Right-arm fast-medium

International information
- National side: Ireland

Career statistics
| Competition | First-class |
|---|---|
| Matches | 5 |
| Runs scored | 55 |
| Batting average | 11.00 |
| 100s/50s | 0/0 |
| Top score | 35 |
| Balls bowled | 873 |
| Wickets | 9 |
| Bowling average | 48.77 |
| 5 wickets in innings | 0 |
| 10 wickets in match | 0 |
| Best bowling | 3/77 |
| Catches/stumpings | 6/– |
- Source: CricketArchive, 16 November 2022

Lewis Patrick Hughes (10 April 1943 – 19 February 2022), also known as Podge Hughes, was an Irish cricketer and maths teacher at Mount Temple Comprehensive School. A right-handed batsman and right-arm fast-medium bowler, he played thirteen times for the Ireland cricket team between 1965 and 1978 including five first-class matches.

== Playing career ==
Hughes made his debut for Ireland against Hampshire in September 1965 in a first-class match. It was very much a poor start to his international career, as he scored a duck in each innings and only took one wicket, and he did not play for Ireland again for almost three years. In June 1972 he played his final first-class match against Scotland and was again absent from the team for an extended period, this time for over five years, returning for a match against Sussex in July 1977. His last match for Ireland was against the MCC at Eglinton, County Londonderry in June 1978.

== Statistics ==
In all matches for Ireland, he scored 159 runs at an average of 10.60. He took 15 wickets at an average of 50.87. In first-class cricket, he scored 55 runs at an average of 11.00 and took nine wickets at an average of 48.77.

== Personal life and death ==
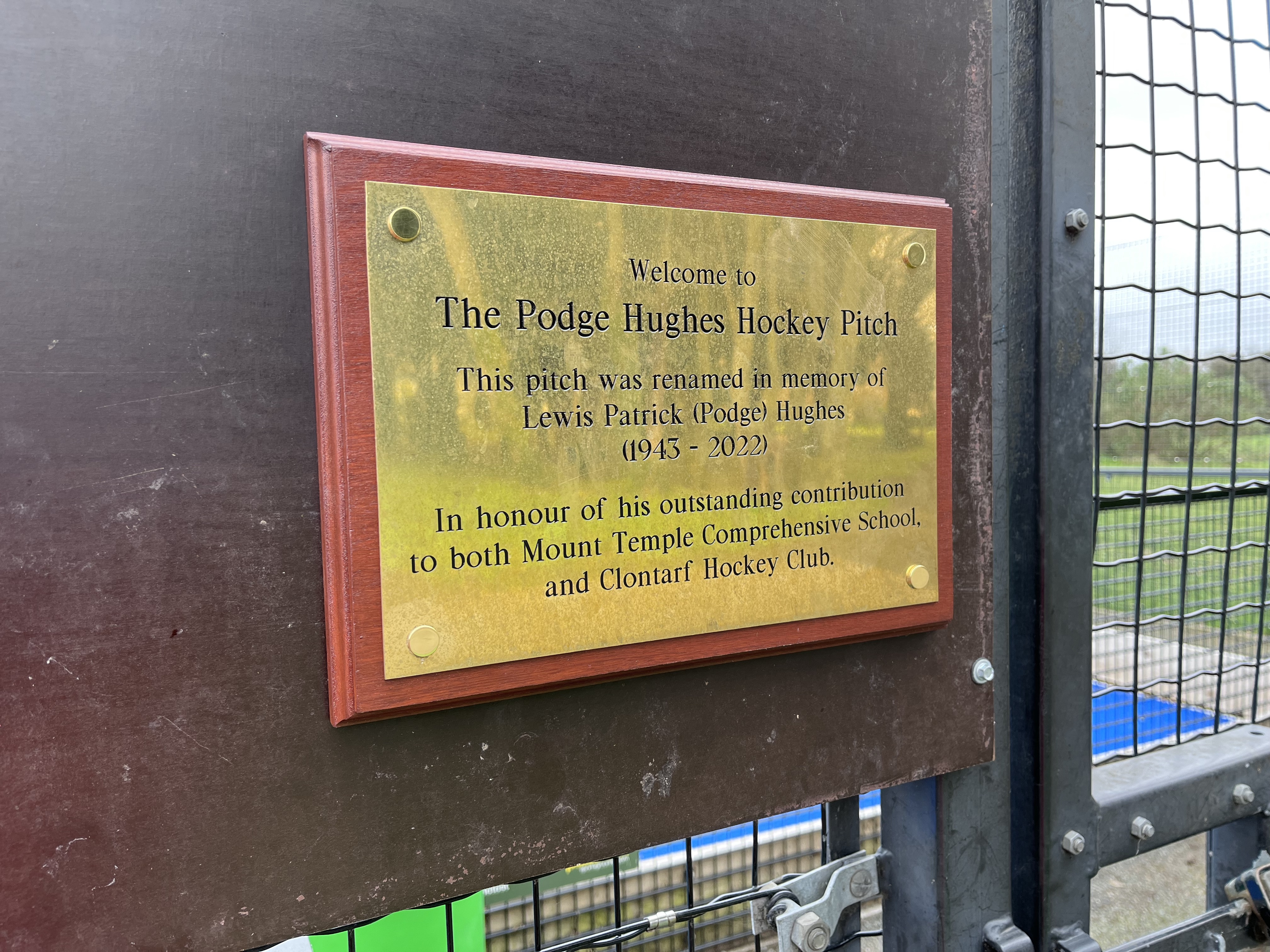
Podge Hughes Hockey Pitch Plaque at Mount Temple School / Clontarf Hockey Club

Hughes died on 19 February 2022, at the age of 78. His cousin Alan also represented Ireland at cricket. In February 2023, the hockey pitch in Mount Temple School was renamed in his memory, in partnership with Clontarf Hockey Club.
