= Matthew McCord =

Irish cricketer (born 1995)

Matthew Andrew Clarke McCord
Personal information
- Born: 30 January 1995 (age 31)
- Source: Cricinfo, 18 July 2018

Matthew Andrew Clarke McCord (born 30 January 1995) is an Irish cricketer. He made his first-class debut for Northern Knights in the 2018 Inter-Provincial Championship on 17 July 2018.
