= James Magee (cricketer, born 1995) =

Irish cricketer (born 1995)

Personal information
- Born: 27 December 1995 (age 30)
- Source: Cricinfo, 28 May 2018

James Magee (born 27 December 1995) is an Irish cricketer. He made his first-class debut for Northern Knights in the 2018 Inter-Provincial Championship on 29 May 2018.
