= Aaron Wright (cricketer) =

Irish cricketer (born 1997)

Personal information
- Full name: Aaron Timothy David Wright
- Born: 22 January 1997 (age 29)
- Source: Cricinfo, 18 July 2018

Aaron Wright (born 22 January 1997) is an Irish cricketer. He made his first-class debut for Northern Knights in the 2018 Inter-Provincial Championship on 17 July 2018.
