= Rory McCann (cricketer) =

Irish cricketer

Personal information
- Full name: Rory Desmond McCann
- Born: 11 January 1985 (age 41); Belfast, County Antrim, Northern Ireland
- Batting: Right-handed
- Role: Wicket-keeper

International information
- National side: Ireland
- ODI debut (cap 34): 1 July 2010 v Kenya
- Last ODI: 7 September 2010 v Canada
- T20I debut (cap 22): 22 February 2012 v Kenya
- Last T20I: 23 February 2012 v Kenya

Career statistics
Competition	ODI	T20I	FC	LA
Matches	8	3	1	12
Runs scored	44	1	4	58
Batting average	11.00	1.00	2.00	9.66
100s/50s	0/0	0/0	0/0	0/0
Top score	18	1	4	18
Catches/stumpings	9/–	1/–	9/–	14/–
- Source: Cricinfo, 24 February 2012

Rory Desmond McCann (born 11 January 1985) is an Irish cricketer from Northern Ireland. McCann is a right-handed batsman who fields as a wicket-keeper. He was born at Belfast in Northern Ireland.

McCann made his debut for Ireland in two List A matches against West Indies A in 2010 at the Stormont. With the unavailability of regular wicket-keeper Niall O'Brien, McCann was selected for Ireland's squad for the 2010 World Cricket League Division One. McCann made his One Day International debut during the tournament, against Kenya. He made six One Day International appearances during the tournament. McCann had an uneventful tournament, which was eventually won by Ireland, scoring 24 runs at an average of 8.00, while behind the stumps he took 8 catches.

During Ireland's tour to Canada in September 2010, McCann made his first-class debut against Canada in the Intercontinental Cup. Opening the batting in this match, he was dismissed for 4 runs in Ireland's first-innings by Khurram Chohan, while in their second-innings he was dismissed for a duck by Henry Osinde. Though a poor match for McCann with the bat, he did stand out behind the stumps, taking five catches in the Canadians first-innings and four in their second. He later played in both of Ireland's One Day Internationals that followed the first-class match. Having not featured for Ireland since their tour to Canada, McCann was selected for Ireland's tour to Kenya in February 2012 and as part of their squad for the 2012 World Twenty20 Qualifier, due in part to Niall O'Brien's participation in the Bangladesh Premier League.

During the tour of Kenya, McCann didn't feature in the first-class Intercontinental Cup match, or the One Day International series that followed it, he did however make his Twenty20 International debut in the three match Twenty20 series which followed, although he wasn't required to bat in the first two matches.
