= Ryan Haire =

Irish cricketer (born 1981)

Personal information
- Full name: Ryan Samuel Haire
- Born: 1 May 1981 (age 45); Dundonald, County Down, Northern Ireland
- Batting: Left-handed
- Bowling: Right-arm leg break

International information
- National side: Ireland
- ODI debut (cap 26): 1 July 2008 v New Zealand
- Last ODI: 2 July 2008 v Scotland

Domestic team information
- Years: Team
- 2000: Ireland

Career statistics
Competition	ODI	First-class
Matches	2	1
Runs scored	56	0
Batting average	28.00	0.00
100s/50s	0/1	0/0
Top score	54	0
Catches/stumpings	2/–	0/–
- Source: CricketArchive, 7 August 2009

Ryan Samuel Haire (born 1 May 1981) is an Irish cricketer from Northern Ireland.

A left-handed batsman and leg spin bowler who is an occasional wicket-keeper he played five times for the Ireland cricket team in 2000 including one first-class match.

== Playing career ==
He first featured for the Ireland cricket team at Under-19 level, playing in the 1999 European Championship and the following years U/19 Cricket World Cup in Sri Lanka.

He made his debut for the senior side later in 2000, playing two matches against the MCC in Eglinton, County Londonderry in May. He was then named in the Irish squad for that year's European Championship, playing in the matches against Denmark and Italy. The following month, he played what to date is his final match for Ireland against Scotland, which is his only first-class match.

Whilst he has not played for the Irish senior side since 2000, he has continued to play at lower levels. He played for an Ireland Development XI in 2001, and for Ireland A in 2003. He was named in the Ireland squad for the 2004 European Under-23 Championship, but the tournament was abandoned due to the weather. He also played in two 2005 ICC Trophy warm-up matches for a Northern Cricket Union President's XI against Bermuda and the USA.

== Statistics ==
In all matches for Ireland, he scored 47 runs at an average of 11.75, with a top score of 31 not out in his first match against the MCC.
