= David Simpson (Irish cricketer) =

Irish cricketer (born 1983)

Personal information
- Full name: David Dean Simpson
- Born: 20 July 1983 (age 43); Derry, Northern Ireland
- Batting: Left-handed
- Bowling: Right-arm fast-medium

Career statistics
Competition	List A
Matches	2
Runs scored	1
Batting average	0.50
100s/50s	–/–
Top score	1
Balls bowled	48
Wickets	0
Bowling average	–
5 wickets in innings	–
10 wickets in match	–
Best bowling	–
Catches/stumpings	–/–
- Source: Cricinfo, 2025

David Simpson (born 20 July 1983) is an Irish cricketer.

== Early life ==
David Dean Simpson was born on 20 July 1983 in Derry, Northern Ireland.

== Career ==
Simpson is a left-handed batsman and a right-arm medium-fast bowler. He represented Ireland A in 2006, and has also represented the Northern Cricket Union President's XI and the Irish Under-23 team.
