= Ragheb Aga =

Kenyan cricketer (born 1984)

Personal information
- Full name: Ragheb Gul Aga
- Born: 10 July 1984 (age 42); Nairobi, Kenya
- Batting: Right-handed
- Bowling: Right arm medium-fast
- Role: All-rounder

International information
- National side: Kenya (2004–2014)
- ODI debut (cap 27): 11 September 2004 v India
- Last ODI: 30 January 2014 v Scotland
- ODI shirt no.: 75
- T20I debut (cap 16): 2 August 2008 v Netherlands
- Last T20I: 26 November 2013 v Canada
- T20I shirt no.: 75

Domestic team information
- Years: Team
- 2007–2010: Sussex (squad no. 28)

Career statistics
Competition	ODI	T20I	FC	LA
Matches	12	20	22	33
Runs scored	150	213	443	396
Batting average	16.66	13.31	14.76	15.84
100s/50s	–/1	0/1	–/1	–/1
Top score	86	52*	66*	86
Balls bowled	402	288	2,038	1,034
Wickets	8	15	34	25
Bowling average	40.00	20.40	38.44	35.52
5 wickets in innings	0	0	1	0
10 wickets in match	0	0	0	0
Best bowling	2/17	3/24	5/46	4/14
Catches/stumpings	3/0	7/0	9/0	8/0
- Source: Cricinfo, 12 May 2017

Ragheb Gul Aga (born 10 July 1984) is a Kenyan cricketer, who played as an all-rounder for Kenya in ODIs and T20Is and for Sussex in English domestic cricket. He became Kenya's third captain in two months in November 2004 when he captained the team at the Intercontinental Cup Finals in place of Hitesh Modi.

== County career ==
In 2008, Aga signed a one-year deal to play County cricket for Sussex, having played List A cricket for the county during the 2007 season. He was, however, surprisingly recalled to the Kenya side in 2008. Aga spent a further two seasons at Sussex, finally being released by the county at the end of the 2010 season.

== Records ==
Aga was the first batsman to score a T20I half-century when batting at number 8 (or lower), when he scored 52 not out against Scotland on 13 November 2013. This was the highest score at this position until it was exceeded by Simi Singh in 2018.
