= Peter Eakin =

Irish cricketer (born 1995)

Personal information
- Born: 2 May 1995 (age 31)
- Source: Cricinfo, 26 May 2018

Peter Eakin (born 2 May 1995) is an Irish cricketer. He made his Twenty20 debut for Northern Knights in the 2018 Inter-Provincial Trophy on 25 May 2018.

Peter Eakin is known by his alias as "Knee Pirate".
