= Nathan Waller (cricketer) =

Zimbabwean cricketer (born 1991)

Personal information
- Full name: Nathan Waller
- Born: 19 November 1991 (age 34); Harare, Zimbabwe
- Batting: Right-handed
- Bowling: Right-arm fast-medium
- Role: All-rounder
- Relatives: Andy Waller (uncle); Malcolm Waller (cousin)

Domestic team information
- Years: Team
- 2008: Centrals

Career statistics
Competition	First-class	List A
Matches	1	3
Runs scored	0	31
Batting average	0.00	10.33
100s/50s	0/0	0/0
Top score	0	21
Balls bowled	126	60
Wickets	2	2
Bowling average	22.50	12.00
5 wickets in innings	0	0
10 wickets in match	0	0
Best bowling	2/16	2/24
Catches/stumpings	0/–	0/–
- Source: CricketArchive, 6 February 2011

Nathan Waller (born 19 November 1991) is a Zimbabwean former first-class cricketer. He represented Zimbabwe at the Under-19 level in 2009 and 2010, and has also appeared domestically for Centrals in the 2008–09 Faithwear Clothing Inter-Provincial One-Day Competition.

In June 2017, he was named, along with his cousin Malcom Waller, in Zimbabwe's Test squad for their one-off match against Sri Lanka. Nathan was not picked in the playing eleven, although his cousin played that match.
