= Phil Eaglestone =

Personal information
- Full name: Phillip Steven Eaglestone
- Born: 17 June 1982 (age 44); Beckenham, Greater London, England
- Batting: Left-handed
- Bowling: Left-arm medium

International information
- National side: Ireland (2008–2012)
- Only ODI (cap 25): 1 July 2008 v New Zealand
- Only T20I (cap 18): 3 February 2010 v Canada

Domestic team information
- Years: Team
- 2016–present: Northern Knights

Career statistics
Competition	ODI	T20I	FC	LA
Matches	10	1	10	11
Runs scored	24	–	40	15
Batting average	4.00	–	3.66	3.75
100s/50s	0/0	–	0/0	0/0
Top score	5.03	–	10*	4
Balls bowled	440	12	814	392
Wickets	20	0	14	12
Bowling average	32.07	–	36.20	31.58
5 wickets in innings	0	–	0	0
10 wickets in match	0	–	0	0
Best bowling	3/48	–	2/50	3/48
Catches/stumpings	0/–	0/–	1/–	0/–
- Source: CricketArchive, 15 July 2018

Phil Eaglestone (born 17 June 1982) is an English-born Irish cricketer. Primarily a left-arm seamer, Eaglestone made his One Day International debut for Ireland in 2008. Two years later he played his first Twenty20 International.

== Career ==
=== Domestic ===
Phil Eaglestone's plays for his local club, that of Strabane. He first represented Ireland in 2008. In his first season playing for them in the Friends Provident Trophy (FPT), he featured in four games, taking five wickets at an average of 22.40. His debut match was against Nottinghamshire on 27 April 2008. He opened the bowling with Kevin O'Brien and finished with figures of 10–2–49–2; his wickets were those of Will Jefferson and Graeme Swann. He was forced to miss one FPT game in May 2008 due to a knee injury.

=== International career ===
Before making his senior team debut, Eagleston represented Ireland A against Denmark and Marylebone Cricket Club. Although Eaglestone was part of the 15-man squad that toured Bangladesh in early 2008, he did not play on the tour. He made his international debut on 1 July 2008, playing against New Zealand in a One Day International (ODI) as part of the 2008 Associates Tri-Series in Scotland. Ireland lost the match, which was played in Scotland, by 290 runs. Eaglestone opened the bowling with fellow seamer Peter Connell – who was also on debut – and finished with figures of 7–0–60–1 as New Zealand amassed 402 from their 50 overs. The first wicket Eaglestone took was that of Brendon McCullum for 166.

Although he was selected in Ireland's squad for the European Cricket Championship, held later in July 2008, a suspected stress fracture of the tibia (shin) led to his withdrawal. The injury also prevented him from playing in the Twenty20 World Cup qualifiers in August 2008.
