= Niall McDonnell (cricketer) =

Irish cricketer (born 1979)

Personal information
- Full name: Niall James McDonnell
- Born: 12 October 1979 (age 47); Strabane, Northern Ireland
- Batting: Right-handed
- Role: Batsman

Domestic team information
- Years: Team
- 2013–present: North West Warriors
- Only First-class: 30 May 2017 North West v Northern

Career statistics
Competition	First-class
Matches	1
Runs scored	30
Batting average	30.00
100s/50s	0/0
Top score	30
Catches/stumpings	2/–
- Source: ESPNcricinfo, 1 June 2017

Niall James McDonnell (born 12 October 1979, Strabane, County Tyrone) is a Northern Irish left-handed batsman cricket player. He was included in the Ireland cricket team squad when the Pakistani cricket team toured Ireland in 2011.

He played two matches against MCC team and scored a century against them at College Park. In February 2016, he was appointed assistant coach of the North West Warriors under Bobby Rao.

McDonnell made his first-class cricket debut for the North West Warriors against Northern Knights in the 2017 Inter-Provincial Championship on 30 May 2017.
