= Peter Connell (cricketer) =

Personal information
- Born: 13 August 1981 (age 45); Dannevirke, Manawatu, New Zealand
- Batting: Right-handed
- Bowling: Right-arm medium-fast
- Role: Bowler

International information
- National side: Ireland
- ODI debut (cap 24): 1 July 2008 v New Zealand
- Last ODI: 17 June 2010 v Canada
- T20I debut (cap 2): 2 August 2008 v Scotland
- Last T20I: 13 February 2010 v Afghanistan

Domestic team information
- Years: Team
- 2009: Ireland
- 2006–2010: North Down
- 2002/03: Hawke's Bay

Career statistics
Competition	ODI	T20I	FC	LA
Matches	13	9	8	28
Runs scored	40	4	37	71
Batting average	20.00	4.00	5.28	17.75
100s/50s	0/0	0/0	0/0	0/0
Top score	22*	3*	18	22*
Balls bowled	564	153	1,169	1,253
Wickets	13	10	35	40
Bowling average	39.84	15.60	17.20	27.67
5 wickets in innings	0	0	2	1
10 wickets in match	0	0	1	0
Best bowling	3/68	3/8	6/28	5/19
Catches/stumpings	1/–	3/–	4/–	3/–
- Source: CricInfo, 21 August 2012

Peter Connell (born 13 August 1981) is a New Zealand-born Irish cricketer. An opening bowler, he made his debut for Ireland in 2008, aged 26. He took part in Ireland's successful campaign in the 2007–08 ICC Intercontinental Cup. Connell has also represented Ireland in One Day Internationals (ODIs) and Twenty20 Internationals (T20Is). In January 2012 he was given a contract with Cricket Ireland.

== Career ==
=== Breakthrough ===
Peter Connell made his Twenty20 debut on 27 June 2008 in a match for Ireland against Bangladesh A. His three overs conceded twenty runs for no wickets and he opened the bowling with Thinus Fourie. Connell made his first-class debut for Ireland on 9 July 2008 in a match against the Netherlands as part of the 2007–08 ICC Intercontinental Cup. Opening the bowling with Thinus Fourie, Connell took a ten-wicket haul, finishing with figures of 10 wickets for 69 runs (10/69) in the match, and also took a hat-trick as Ireland won by an innings and 67 runs. He was the 16th player in the history of first-class cricket to take a hat-trick on debut and the first to do so in an international match. He is also the only player to have taken a first-class hat-trick for Ireland. With 30 first-class wickets for Ireland, Connell is the 16th highest wicket-taker for Ireland. In the 2007–08 ICC Intercontinental Cup, Connell was Ireland's leading wicket-taker for the tournament. His haul of 28 wickets from 5 matches, at an average of 11.67, was also the fourth highest total of wickets for that year's tournament and was the best average for bowlers with 10 wickets or more.

Ireland played in the ICC World Twenty20 Qualifiers in August 2008. On 2 August, the team played their maiden T20 International, beating Scotland by four wickets; Connell made his T20I debut in the match, along with the rest of the Ireland team. Ireland progressed to the final and ended up sharing the trophy with the Netherlands as the match was rained off. Connell finished the tournament with 6 wickets from 4 matches, at an average of 6.00; he was Ireland's second leading wicket-taker – behind Andre Botha with 8, and tied with Alex Cusack who also had 6 – and was the equal fifth leading wicket-taker in the tournament.

=== 2009 ===
Ireland took part in the 2009 Friends Provident Trophy, losing five of their eight matches and two were rained off. In Ireland's only victory of the competition, Connell took career best figures of 5/19; it was his first five-wicket haul in one-day matches, beating his previous best bowling figures of 4/71. Ireland bowled Worcestershire out for 58, their lowest ever one-day total, to win by 94 runs. Playing at New Road, Worcester, Ireland received a standing ovation as they walked off the pitch. Connell finished the competition with 10 wickets at an average of 21.30. In the 2009 ICC World Twenty20 in June 2009, Ireland progressed to the super eights. Despite helping Ireland qualify for the tournament the previous year, Connell played just one match in the tournament; opening the bowling, he bowled just one over for fourteen runs in a match Ireland lost to New Zealand.

Ireland's campaign in the 2009–10 ICC Intercontinental Cup, in pursuit of their fourth consecutive title in the competition, began in July 2009. Connell played in their first match, which was against Kenya; opening the bowling, he returned match figures of 2/97. Phil Simmons, Ireland's coach, was dissatisfied with Connell's performance and he was dropped for Ireland's next Intercontinental Cup match, which was against Scotland. Simmons cited "a drop in attitude" for Connell's lack of success and subsequent drop, adding "I need to see that he's back to where he was at towards the beginning of last year. I want people to realise just how nice it is to be involved with this squad and not take it for granted." Connell was given an opportunity to prove himself in an Ireland A match against Marylebone Cricket Club.

In January 2012 Cricket Ireland increased the number of player contracts to 23 across three categories, and Connell was given a category C contract.
