= Fintan McAllister =

Irish cricketer (born 1987)

Personal information
- Full name: Fintan Patrick McAllister
- Born: 9 February 1987 (age 39); Dublin, Ireland
- Batting: Left-handed
- Role: Wicket-keeper batsman

International information
- National side: Ireland (2008–2009)

Domestic team information
- Years: Team
- 2013–2016: Leinster Lightning

Career statistics
| Competition | FC | LA | T20 |
|---|---|---|---|
| Matches | 1 | 4 | 1 |
| Runs scored | – | 26 | – |
| Batting average | – | 13.00 | – |
| 100s/50s | –/– | 0/0 | –/– |
| Top score | – | 13* | – |
| Catches/stumpings | 1/0 | 6/0 | 1/0 |
- Source: ESPNcricinfo, 3 May 2017

Fintan Patrick McAllister (born 9 February 1987 in Dublin, Ireland) is an Irish cricketer. He is a left-handed batsman and wicket-keeper. He has represented the Ireland national side, the Ireland national under-19 cricket team in 2006, and has also played for the Irish Under-23 team.

== Playing career ==
He represented Ireland in the 2005 European Under-19 Championship, as well as the 2006 Under-19 Cricket World Cup. In general, McAllister serves as an opening batsman. He subsequently progressed to the Irish Under-23s team and took part in the 2006 European Under-23 Championship.

On the domestic front, he plays cricket for Malahide Cricket Club and also represents Leinster Lightning in Dublin.

== Personal life ==
He is the older brother of Irish footballer David McAllister, who plays for Sheffield United and represents the Republic of Ireland Under-23 national football team.
