= Ben Ackland =

English born Irish cricketer (born 1989)

Personal information
- Full name: Benjamin James Ackland
- Born: 26 October 1989 (age 37); Nuneaton, Warwickshire, England
- Nickname: Ackers
- Height: 6 ft 1 in (1.85 m)
- Batting: Right-handed
- Bowling: Right-arm off break
- Role: Batsman

Domestic team information
- Years: Team
- 2010–2012: Cambridge MCCU

Career statistics
| Competition | First-class |
|---|---|
| Matches | 7 |
| Runs scored | 365 |
| Batting average | 33.18 |
| 100s/50s | 0/4 |
| Top score | 74 |
| Balls bowled | 6 |
| Wickets | 0 |
| Bowling average | – |
| 5 wickets in innings | – |
| 10 wickets in match | – |
| Best bowling | – |
| Catches/stumpings | 2/– |
- Source: CricketArchive, 9 September 2013

Benjamin James Ackland (born 26 October 1989) is an English-born Irish cricketer. He is a right-handed batsman who bowls right-arm off break. He was born in Nuneaton in Warwickshire, and educated at Queen's College, Taunton.

Ackland made his debut for Ireland Under-19s in a Youth One Day International against England Under-19s in the 2008 Under-19 World Cup. He made six appearances in that competition and also played for Ireland Under-19s in 2010 Under-19 World Cup, making five appearances in that competition.

Later in 2010, while studying for his degree in Sports Science & Coaching at Anglia Ruskin University, Ackland made his first-class debut for Cambridge MCCU against Leicestershire. He made a further appearance that season against Sussex. In the 2011 season, he made three further first-class appearances for the team, playing against Essex, Middlesex and Surrey. In his five first-class matches to date, he has scored 293 runs at an average of 41.85, with a high score of 74. This score, one of four fifties he made, came against Middlesex.
