= James Cameron-Dow =

Irish cricketer (born 1990)

Personal information
- Full name: James Cameron-Dow
- Born: 18 May 1990 (age 36); Cape Town, Cape Province, South Africa
- Batting: Left-handed
- Bowling: Slow left-arm orthodox
- Role: Bowler

International information
- National side: Ireland (2019)
- Only Test (cap 12): 15 March 2019 v Afghanistan
- ODI debut (cap 54): 2 March 2019 v Afghanistan
- Last ODI: 10 March 2019 v Afghanistan

Domestic team information
- Years: Team
- 2018–present: Northern Knights

Career statistics
Competition	Test	ODI	FC	LA
Matches	1	4	10	18
Runs scored	41	7	244	107
Batting average	41.00	–	34.85	21.40
100s/50s	0/0	0/0	0/1	0/0
Top score	32*	7*	76*	34*
Balls bowled	143	186	1,627	804
Wickets	3	5	31	16
Bowling average	39.33	30.20	31.12	42.93
5 wickets in innings	0	0	3	0
10 wickets in match	0	0	0	0
Best bowling	2/94	3/32	7/77	3/32
Catches/stumpings	2/–	2/–	4/–	11/–
- Source: Cricinfo, 24 April 2019

James Cameron-Dow (born 18 May 1990) is a South African-born Irish cricketer. He made his international debut for the Ireland cricket team in March 2019.

== Domestic career ==
James made his List A debut for Northern Knights in the 2018 Inter-Provincial Cup on 28 May 2018. He made his first-class debut for Northern Knights in the 2018 Inter-Provincial Championship on 29 May 2018. He was the leading wicket-taker for Northern Knights in the 2018 Inter-Provincial Championship, with fourteen dismissals in four matches. In April 2019, he was one of five cricketers to be awarded with an Emerging Player Contract by Cricket Ireland, ahead of the 2019 domestic season.

== International career ==
In January 2019, James was named in Ireland's Test and One Day International (ODI) squads for their series against Afghanistan in India. He made his ODI debut for Ireland against Afghanistan on 2 March 2019. He made his Test debut for Ireland against Afghanistan on 15 March 2019.
