= North West of Ireland Cricket Union =

North West Cricket Union
- Sport: Cricket
- Abbreviation: NWCU
- Founded: 1890
- Affiliation: Cricket Ireland
- Headquarters: Derry
- President: John Semple
- CEO: Kathryn Rough
- Coach: Boyd Rankin

Official website
- www.northwestcricket.com

The North West of Ireland Cricket Union, often referred to as the North West Cricket Union, is one of five provincial governing bodies in Ireland. Along with the Connacht, Leinster, Munster and Northern unions, it makes up the Irish Cricket Union (now known as Cricket Ireland), the supreme governing body of Irish cricket.

The North West jurisdiction covers counties Fermanagh and Londonderry and part of Tyrone in Northern Ireland and Donegal in the Republic of Ireland. All of these counties are in Ulster, the northern province in Ireland. The Union organises the North West Senior Cup and the North West Senior League.

The Union was formed as the County Derry Cricket Union in 1890, changing to the current name in 1907 to reflect the wider geographical basis of its membership.

== Interprovincial Team ==
In 2013, Cricket Ireland formed the three-day Interprovincial Championship, featuring teams from Leinster, the NCU and the North West. The North West team is known as the North West Warriors. On 8 April, they announced former Indian cricketer Bobby Rao as their coach.
