= Johnny Thompson (cricketer) =

Irish cricketer (born 1983)

Personal information
- Full name: Jonathan Thompson
- Born: 8 June 1983 (age 43)

Domestic team information
- Years: Team
- 2013-2017: North West Warriors
- 2017-2020: Brigade
- 2020-2024: Newbuildings
- FC debut: 20 June 2017 North West v Leinster
- LA debut: 1 May 2017 North West v Leinster

Career statistics
Competition	FC	LA	T20
Matches	3	3	4
Runs scored	38	85	86
Batting average	7.60	42.50	28.66
100s/50s	0/0	0/1	0/0
Top score	25	51	39
Balls bowled	222	132	60
Wickets	4	2	4
Bowling average	34.75	59.50	19.00
5 wickets in innings	0	0	0
10 wickets in match	0	0	0
Best bowling	3/61	2/46	2/19
Catches/stumpings	1/–	1/–	2/–
- Source: ESPNcricinfo, 31 August 2017

Johnny Thompson (born 8 June 1983) is an Irish cricketer. He made his List A debut for North West Warriors in the 2017 Inter-Provincial Cup on 1 May 2017. He made his Twenty20 cricket debut for North West Warriors in the 2017 Inter-Provincial Trophy on 26 May 2017. He made his first-class debut for North West Warriors in the 2017 Inter-Provincial Championship on 20 June 2017.

In June 2023, Thompson said the season would be his last of club cricket, citing his age and a shoulder injury as factors in the decision. He also said he'd "always wanted to take up golf". In July 2024, he was man of the match in Newbuildings' first win of the North West Senior cup.
