= Eddie Richardson (cricketer) =

Irish cricketer (born 1990)

Personal information
- Full name: Edward James Richardson
- Born: 22 July 1990 (age 36); Louth, County Louth, Ireland
- Batting: Right-handed
- Bowling: Right-arm medium

International information
- National side: Ireland (2013–2014)
- ODI debut (cap 41): 6 September 2013 v Scotland
- Last ODI: 8 September 2013 v Scotland
- ODI shirt no.: 11

Domestic team information
- Years: Team
- 2013–2018: Leinster Lightning
- 2019: Munster Reds

Career statistics
Competition	ODI	FC	LA	T20
Matches	2	5	9	12
Runs scored	12	166	56	54
Batting average	12.00	33.20	11.20	7.71
100s/50s	0/0	0/2	0/0	0/0
Top score	12	81	27	18
Balls bowled	66	516	348	221
Wickets	2	10	8	17
Bowling average	27.00	26.50	39.12	16.88
5 wickets in innings	0	0	1	0
10 wickets in match	0	0	0	0
Best bowling	2/39	4/33	5/61	4/25
Catches/stumpings	0/–	4/–	0/–	3/–
- Source: CricketArchive, 30 May 2021

Edward James Richardson (born 22 July 1990) is an Irish cricketer. Richardson is a right-handed medium pace bowler who also bats right-handed. On 6 September 2013, Richardson made his One Day International debut for Ireland against Scotland. He made his Twenty20 cricket debut for Leinster Lightning in the 2017 Inter-Provincial Trophy on 26 May 2017. He made his first-class debut for Leinster Lightning in the 2017 Inter-Provincial Championship on 5 June 2017.

In August 2013, he earned his maiden call-up to the national team for the series against England. In July 2014, he took his first five-wicket haul in List A cricket against Sri Lanka A.
