= Nigel Jones (cricketer) =

New Zealand-Irish cricketer (born 1982)

Personal information
- Full name: Nigel Geoffrey Jones
- Born: 22 April 1982 (age 44); Timaru, Canterbury, New Zealand
- Batting: Right-handed
- Bowling: Right-arm medium

International information
- National side: Ireland
- ODI debut (cap 33): 1 July 2010 v Kenya
- Last ODI: 25 August 2011 v England
- T20I debut (cap 20): 13 February 2010 v Afghanistan
- Last T20I: 24 September 2012 v West Indies

Domestic team information
- Years: Team
- 2007–2014: Civil Service North
- 2015–2022: C.I.Y.M.S. Cricket Club

Career statistics
Competition	ODI	T20I	LA	T20
Matches	14	5	18	11
Runs scored	74	42	129	123
Batting average	14.80	21.00	16.12	20.50
100s/50s	0/0	0/0	0/0	0/1
Top score	25*	14*	30	57
Balls bowled	389	12	545	120
Wickets	10	0	12	5
Bowling average	23.40	–	31.33	23.60
5 wickets in innings	0	–	0	0
10 wickets in match	0	–	0	0
Best bowling	2/19	–	2/19	2/21
Catches/stumpings	7/–	1/–	9/–	3/–
- Source: CricketArchive, 19 May 2018

Nigel Geoffrey Jones (born 22 April 1982) is a New Zealand-born Irish cricketer. Jones is a right-handed batsman who bowls right-arm medium pace. Jones plays international cricket for Ireland. He was born in Timaru, New Zealand.

Jones made his List-A debut for Ireland against Jamaica on their tour of the West Indies in 2010. He made his Twenty20 debut when Ireland played Sri Lanka A in the 2010 Quadrangular Twenty20 Series in Sri Lanka. Jones made his Twenty20 International debut when Ireland played Afghanistan in the final of the 2010 ICC World Twenty20 Qualifier. This is his only Twenty20 International to date.

Jones was a member of Ireland's 2010 ICC World Cricket League Division One winning team. During the tournament, he made his One Day International debut which came against Kenya. He played 6 further One Day International's during the tournament. During the tour, he played a further 2 Twenty20's against a West Indies XI. A member of Ireland's squad for the 2010 ICC World Twenty20, Jones did not feature in any of Ireland's matches during the tournament. He was also selected in Ireland's 15-man squad for the 2011 World Cup, but did not play in the tournament. In January 2012 Cricket Ireland increased the number of player contracts to 23 across three categories, and Jones was given a category C contract.
