= Greg Thompson (cricketer) =

Irish cricketer (born 1987)

Personal information
- Full name: Greg James Thompson
- Born: 17 September 1987 (age 39); Lisburn, Northern Ireland
- Height: 6 ft 0 in (1.83 m)
- Batting: Right-handed
- Bowling: Right-arm leg break
- Role: Bowler

International information
- National side: Ireland (2004–2019)
- ODI debut (cap 23): 18 March 2008 v Bangladesh
- Last ODI: 22 March 2008 v Bangladesh
- T20I debut (cap 39): 5 September 2016 v Hong Kong
- Last T20I: 14 July 2019 v Zimbabwe

Domestic team information
- Years: Team
- 2005: Lancashire
- 2007–2008: Durham UCCE
- 2013–present: Northern Knights

Career statistics
Competition	ODI	T20I	FC	LA
Matches	3	10	14	13
Runs scored	2	107	207	73
Batting average	1.00	15.28	20.70	9.12
100s/50s	0/0	0/0	0/0	0/0
Top score	2	44	38	23
Balls bowled	72	–	1,107	84
Wickets	1	–	17	2
Bowling average	73.00	–	35.58	37.50
5 wickets in innings	0	–	0	0
10 wickets in match	0	-	0	0
Best bowling	1/35	–	3/76	1/2
Catches/stumpings	1/–	2/–	7/–	6/–
- Source: CricketArchive, 21 April 2020

Greg James Thompson (born 17 September 1987) is an Irish cricketer from Northern Ireland. He is a right-handed batsman and a leg-break bowler. He has played for Ireland since 2004, playing for the full squad before reverting to play for the Under-17, Under-19 and Under-23 teams respectively from 2005 onwards. He is at Royal School Armagh. He played for Lancashire during 2005, having played for Hampshire's Second XI in 2004. He represented Lancashire in the Second XI trophy during 2006.

Thompson represented Ireland in the 2004 and 2006 Under-19 World Cups. He made his One Day International (ODI) debut against Bangladesh on 18 March 2008, and went on to play in all three matches of this tour (his only ODI appearances to date). He made his Twenty20 International (T20I) debut against Hong Kong more than 8 years later on 5 September 2016.

He is the joint leading wicket-taker along with Moisés Henriques in Under-19 Cricket World Cup tournament history with 27 dismissals.

In July 2019, he was selected to play for the Belfast Titans in the inaugural edition of the Euro T20 Slam cricket tournament. However, the following month the tournament was cancelled.
