= Leinster Cricket Union =

Provincial sports governing body

Cricket Leinster
- Sport: Cricket
- Abbreviation: CL
- Founded: 1890
- Affiliation: Cricket Ireland
- Headquarters: Ballsbridge
- Location: Leinster Region
- President: Brian Kelleher
- CEO: Philip Smith
- Vice president: Albert Harper
- Coach: Andre Botha

Official website
- www.cricketleinster.ie
- Other key staff: Lorcan Tucker (Leinster Lightning captain)

The Leinster Cricket Union, also known as Cricket Leinster, is one of five provincial governing bodies for cricket in Ireland.

Along with the Northern, Munster, Connacht and North West unions, it makes up the Irish Cricket Union (now known as Cricket Ireland), the overall governing body of Irish cricket.

Cricket Leinster oversees approximately 50% of the cricket playing population on the island and has over 6,000 registered adult players.

== Jurisdiction ==
The Leinster jurisdiction covers counties in the traditional Irish province of Leinster in the Republic of Ireland. In 2005, there were 40 clubs fielding 97 teams affiliated to the union. There are currently 48 clubs affiliated to the Union, this includes Cork County, Cork Harlequins and County Cavan who play in Leinster competitions despite not geographically being in the province.

== History ==
The Union was founded in 1890 as the "Leinster Branch of the Irish Cricket Union". Initially, there was strong resistance to competitive cricket and the Leinster Senior League and Leinster Senior Cup did not start until 1919, although junior clubs competed for the Intermediate Cup from 1895 and a schools league began in 1906.

== Interprovincial team ==
In 2013, Cricket Ireland formed the Interprovincial Championship, Cup and Trophy competitions featuring teams from Leinster, the NCU and the North West. The Leinster team is known as Leinster Lightning. Lightning are the most successful team in the competitions' history, winning 21 of a possible 29 trophies.

In addition, Leinster oversees a Men’s and Women’s team which participate in the National Future Series. Leinster also runs an Under 23 competition which involves teams from South Leinster, North Leinster and Dublin University (Trinity College).

== Governance ==
In 2017, Philip Smith was appointed General Manager as part of the revamped Executive and has retained the role ever since. Michael Cotter was appointed Cricket Operations & Administration Manager in 2024, replacing Kevin Gallagher.

There are 11 staff covering development, performance, operations, administration and finance roles. In addition, there are 48 voluntary posts elected by the member clubs each autumn.

The Cricket Leinster Board oversees a number of committees which are responsible for different governance areas.

The current members of the Board are:

- John Heavey (Chairperson of the Board)
- Barry Tucker (Chair of Finance)
- Brian Kelleher (Chair of Cricket & 2026 President)
- Stella Downes
- Jannat Ramay
- Aedamar Howlett
- Alan Lewis
- Alan Maginnis
- Asad Ali
- Ronan O'Sullivan
- Philip Smith (General Manager) attends ex-officio
