= Lee Nelson (cricketer) =

Irish cricketer (born 1990)

Personal information
- Full name: Lee Trevor Nelson
- Born: 5 December 1990 (age 35); Craigavon, Northern Ireland
- Batting: Right-handed
- Bowling: Right-arm off break
- Relatives: Alan Nelson (uncle); Noel Nelson (uncle)

Domestic team information
- Years: Team
- 2013–present: Northern Knights
- FC debut: 30 May 2017 Northern v North West
- Only LA: 6 August 2017 Northern v North West

Career statistics
Competition	FC	LA	T20
Matches	2	1	3
Runs scored	32	8	10
Batting average	10.66	8.00	10.00
100s/50s	0/0	0/0	0/0
Top score	17	8	7
Balls bowled	48	24	42
Wickets	0	1	1
Bowling average	–	28.00	64.00
5 wickets in innings	–	0	0
10 wickets in match	–	0	0
Best bowling	–	1/28	1/44
Catches/stumpings	0/–	0/–	0/–
- Source: Cricinfo, 9 August 2017

Lee Trevor Nelson (born 5 December 1990) is an Irish cricketer. He made his Twenty20 cricket debut for Northern Knights in the 2017 Inter-Provincial Trophy on 26 May 2017. He made his first-class debut for Northern Knights in the 2017 Inter-Provincial Championship on 30 May 2017. He made his List A debut for Northern Knights in the 2017 Inter-Provincial Cup on 6 August 2017.
