= Christopher Dougherty =

Irish cricketer (born 1988)

Chris Dougherty
Personal information
- Full name: Christopher Dougherty
- Born: 16 January 1988 (age 38)
- Batting: Left-handed
- Role: Batsman, wicket-keeper
- Relatives: Dekker Curry (uncle)

International information
- National side: Ireland (2014)

Domestic team information
- Years: Team
- 2008–2010: Leeds/Bradford MCCU
- 2013–present: Northern Knights

Career statistics
Competition	FC	LA	T20
Matches	7	6	1
Runs scored	205	124	42
Batting average	15.76	24.80	42.00
100s/50s	0/1	0/0	0/0
Top score	74	46	42
Catches/stumpings	14/0	5/0	2/0
- Source: ESPNcricinfo, 28 August 2018

Christopher Dougherty (born 16 January 1988, Ireland) is an Irish cricketer who played for Leeds/Bradford MCC University in 2010. He made his List A debut for Ireland against Sri Lanka A cricket team at Civil Service Cricket Club Ground, Belfast where he scored 13 runs after opening the batting. He was part of Ireland's squad for the 2008 Under-19 Cricket World Cup.

He made his first-class debut for Northern Knights in the 2017 Inter-Provincial Championship on 30 May 2017. He made his Twenty20 debut for Northern Knights in the 2017 Inter-Provincial Trophy on 21 July 2017.
