= Max Sorensen =

Personal information
- Full name: Max Christian Sorensen
- Born: 18 November 1985 (age 40); Johannesburg, South Africa
- Batting: Right-handed
- Bowling: Right-arm fast-medium
- Role: Bowler

International information
- National side: Ireland (2012–2016)
- ODI debut (cap 40): 3 September 2013 v England
- Last ODI: 16 June 2016 v Sri Lanka
- ODI shirt no.: 26
- T20I debut (cap 23): 22 February 2012 v Kenya
- Last T20I: 13 March 2016 v Netherlands

Domestic team information
- Years: Team
- 2013–2018: Leinster Lightning
- 2018–2019: Munster Reds

Career statistics
Competition	ODI	T20I	FC	LA
Matches	13	26	9	22
Runs scored	125	92	56	199
Batting average	20.83	18.40	9.33	18.09
100s/50s	0/0	0/0	0/0	0/0
Top score	31	26	19*	31
Balls bowled	543	390	1,262	813
Wickets	16	26	32	24
Bowling average	32.50	18.11	20.53	30.08
5 wickets in innings	0	0	2	0
10 wickets in match	0	0	0	0
Best bowling	4/40	3/17	5/37	4/40
Catches/stumpings	3/–	9/–	6/–	6/–
- Source: CricketArchive, 15 July 2018

Max Christian Sorensen (born 18 November 1985) is a South African-born Irish former international cricketer, who played for the Irish national team. Born in Johannesburg, Sorensen is a right-handed batsman who bowls right-arm fast-medium. He has played for The Hills Cricket Club in Dublin since 2007. In July 2017, he announced his retirement from international cricket.

== International career ==
Sorensen was called up to Ireland's squad for their tour to Kenya in February 2012, and for their subsequent participation in the 2012 World Twenty20 Qualifier. During the Kenyan leg of the tour, Sorensen made his first-class debut against Kenya in the Intercontinental Cup. In a match dominated by spin bowlers, Sorensen was twice dismissed for a duck, once by spinner Hiren Varaiya in Ireland's first-innings and by Nehemiah Odhiambo in Ireland's second-innings. The match was scheduled to last four days, but was completed in two, with Ireland winning by 10 runs.

Although Sorensen didn't feature in the One Day International series that followed, he did however make his Twenty20 International debut in the three match Twenty20 series which followed, taking the wickets of Rakep Patel and Alex Obanda to finish with figures of 2/17 in an Irish victory. The day after this match, he featured in the second Twenty20 International between the teams, which again ended in an Irish victory. Sorensen took one wicket in this match, that of Ragheb Aga.

On 18 January 2015, it was announced that Sorensen had been called into the Cricket Ireland squad for the 2015 Cricket World Cup as a replacement for the injured Tim Murtagh.
