= Albert van der Merwe =

South African-born Irish cricketer (born 1979)

Personal information
- Full name: Albert van der Merwe
- Born: 1 June 1979 (age 47); Bellville, Cape Province, South Africa
- Batting: Right-handed
- Bowling: Right-arm off break

International information
- National side: Ireland
- ODI debut (cap 36): 9 July 2010 v Netherlands
- Last ODI: 20 September 2011 v Canada

Career statistics
Competition	ODI	FC	LA
Matches	9	7	14
Runs scored	15	42	31
Batting average	3.75	10.50	5.16
100s/50s	0/0	0/0	0/0
Top score	237*	20	8
Balls bowled	432	837	605
Wickets	11	28	12
Bowling average	29.36	15.35	39.50
5 wickets in innings	1	3	1
10 wickets in match	0	1	0
Best bowling	5/49	6/27	5/49
Catches/stumpings	1/–	5/–	3/–
- Source: CricketArchive, 28 May 2013

Albert van der Merwe (born 1 June 1979) is a South African-born Irish cricketer. Van der Merwe is right-handed batsman who bowls right-arm off break and who played international cricket for Ireland. He was born in Bellville, Cape Province. He was educated at Huguenot High School, Wellington, Cape Province. Van der Merwe captained the North West University (Pukke) (formerly known as Potchefstroomse Universiteit) to their maiden SA University title in 2001. He was also part of the 2001 side that won the South African National Club Championships. Van der Merwe has played cricket for Irish club sides Derriaghy, The Hills and YMCA CC. Van der Merwe announced his retirement from international cricket in 2013. He is currently head coach of Leinster Lightning, one of 3 interprovincial teams in the Irish Domestic First Class set up.

Van der Merwe made his List-A debut for Ireland against West Indies A during their tour of Ireland, where he played both matches against the tourists.

Van der Merwe was a member of Ireland's 2010 ICC World Cricket League Division One winning squad. During the tournament, he made his One Day International debut against the Netherlands.

Van der Merwe was selected in Ireland's 15-man squad for the 2011 World Cup, but did not play in the tournament. In January 2012 Cricket Ireland increased the number of player contracts to 23 across three categories, and van der Merwe was given a category C contract.

In April 2019, Cricket Ireland appointed him as the Talent Pathway Manager and Coach of the national team.
