= James Shannon (cricketer) =

Irish cricketer

Personal information
- Full name: James Norman Knight Shannon
- Born: 12 February 1990 (age 36); Belfast, Northern Ireland
- Batting: Right-handed
- Bowling: Right-arm off break
- Role: Batsman

International information
- National side: Ireland
- Only ODI (cap 39): 26 May 2013 v Pakistan
- ODI shirt no.: 77
- T20I debut (cap 26): 30 November 2013 v Afghanistan
- Last T20I: 29 June 2018 v India

Domestic team information
- Years: Team
- 2013–present: Northern Knights

Career statistics
Competition	ODI	T20I	FC	LA
Matches	1	8	13	25
Runs scored	2	111	833	386
Batting average	2.00	13.87	39.66	18.38
100s/50s	0/0	0/1	1/7	0/1
Top score	2	60	140*	67
Balls bowled	–	6	102	–
Wickets	–	0	2	–
Bowling average	–	–	25.00	–
5 wickets in innings	–	–	0	–
10 wickets in match	–	–	0	–
Best bowling	–	–	1/7	–
Catches/stumpings	0/–	1/–	5/–	4/–
- Source: CricketArchive, 12 May 2019

James Norman Knight Shannon (born 12 February 1990) is an Irish former cricketer from Northern Ireland. Shannon is a right-handed batsman who bowls right-arm off spin. On 26 May 2013, Shannon made his One Day International debut for Ireland against Pakistan. In January 2020, Shannon announced his retirement from cricket.

== Career ==
He scored the most runs in the 2017 Inter-Provincial Trophy, Ireland's domestic Twenty20 competition, with 251 runs in six matches. He also scored the most runs in the 2017 Inter-Provincial Championship tournament, with 446 runs in four matches.

In December 2018, he was one of nineteen players to be awarded a central contract by Cricket Ireland for the 2019 season.

In May 2018, he was named in a fourteen-man squad for Ireland's first ever Test match, to be played against Pakistan later the same month, but he was not selected to play. In June 2018, Shannon scored his first T20I half-century against India.
