= Andrew White (Irish cricketer) =

Irish cricketer (born 1980)

Personal information
- Full name: Andrew Rowland White
- Born: 3 July 1980 (age 46); Newtownards, County Down, Northern Ireland
- Height: 6 ft 0 in (1.83 m)
- Batting: Right-handed
- Bowling: Right-arm off break
- Role: All-rounder

International information
- National side: Ireland (2004–2014)
- ODI debut (cap 11): 13 June 2006 v England
- Last ODI: 12 September 2014 v Scotland
- T20I debut (cap 10): 2 August 2008 v Scotland
- Last T20I: 24 March 2012 v Afghanistan

Domestic team information
- Years: Team
- 2004–2005: Northamptonshire

Career statistics
Competition	ODI	T20I	FC	LA
Matches	61	18	34	114
Runs scored	776	137	1,695	1,674
Batting average	18.04	22.83	48.42	20.66
100s/50s	0/1	0/0	5/9	0/7
Top score	79	29	152*	79
Balls bowled	869	24	1,563	1,852
Wickets	25	2	23	46
Bowling average	27.52	9.00	35.00	30.84
5 wickets in innings	0	0	0	0
10 wickets in match	0	0	0	0
Best bowling	4/44	2/18	4/99	4/22
Catches/stumpings	21/–	2/–	28/–	35/–
- Source: CricketArchive, 11 February 2015

Andrew Roland White (born 3 July 1980) is a former cricketer from Northern Ireland. He played in the 2007 Cricket World Cup in the West Indies, where Ireland reached the Super 8 stage. He is now a P.E. teacher in Grosvenor Grammar school. Andrew is currently the Free Kicks coach at Ards Football Club.

== Playing career ==
He was a right-handed batsman and a right-arm off-break bowler. He played for Northamptonshire, and with Ireland. He also lined up for the Irish Under-19s squad between 1999 and 2000.

White played in the ICC Trophy in 2001 and 2005 for Ireland, during the latter tournament, helping the Irish team to the final. Since 2006, he has played Twenty20 cricket with Northamptonshire.

White was selected in Ireland's 15-man squad for the 2011 World Cup.

On 10 February 2015, White announced his retirement from cricket at the age of 34. He played 232 times for Ireland between 2000 and 2014 where scored 4560 runs and taking 125 wickets.

== Coaching career ==
White was named as Specialist Coach of Ireland cricket team for the 2017 Desert T20 Challenge.
