= List of Munster Reds Twenty20 players =

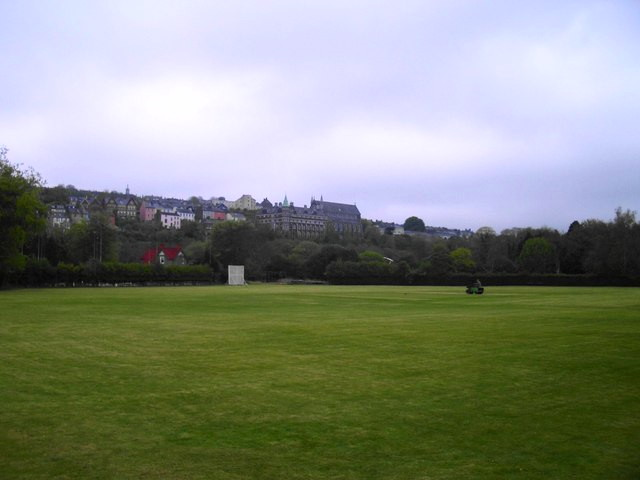
Munster Reds made their debut in Twenty20 cricket at their home ground, The Mardyke (pictured).

Munster Reds is an Irish cricket team. It was formed in 2017 and became a Twenty20 team in the same year. They played their first Twenty20 match in the 2017 Inter-Provincial Trophy, against Northern Knights. In total, 80 players have appeared in Twenty20 cricket for Munster Reds.

Stephen Doheny is Munster Reds' leading run-scorer in Twenty20 cricket, aggregating 569 runs. Doheny's score of 150 not out, achieved in 2025 against Northern Knights, is the highest score by a Munster Reds batsman, and Doheny also has the teams best batting average: 35.56. Among the bowlers, Josh Manley has taken more wickets than any other, claiming 35 – ten wickets more than that of the second most prolific bowler. Curtis Campher has the best bowling figures in an innings: he claimed five wickets against North West Warriors in a 2025 match, while only conceding 16 runs, which included taking five wickets in five balls. PJ Moor has kept wicket in 18 of Munster Reds' Twenty20 matches, taking 13 catches and effecting 3 stumpings. Liam McCarthy has claimed the highest number of catches among fielders, taking 11.

Players are initially listed in order of appearance; where players made their debut in the same match, they are initially listed by batting order.

== Key ==
General

- † – Wicket-keeper
- First – Year of Twenty20 debut for Munster Reds
- Last – Year of latest Twenty20 match for Munster Reds
- Mat – Number of Twenty20 appearances for Munster Reds

Batting

- Runs – Runs scored in career
- HS – Highest score
- Avg – Runs scored per dismissal
- * – Batsman remained not out

Bowling

- Balls – Balls bowled in career
- Wkt – Wickets taken in career
- BBI – Best bowling in an innings
- Ave – Average runs per wicket

Fielding

- Ca – Catches taken
- St – Stumpings effected
All statistics correct as of the end of the Irish 2025 cricket season.

== List of Twenty20 cricketers ==
Munster Reds Twenty20 players
| No. | Name | Nationality | First | Last | Mat | Runs | HS | Avg | Balls | Wkt | BBI | Ave | Ca | St | Ref(s) |
| No. | Name | Nationality | First | Last | Mat | Batting | | | Bowling | | | | Fielding | | Ref(s) |
|---|---|---|---|---|---|---|---|---|---|---|---|---|---|---|---|
| 1 | Jack Tector | Ireland | 2017 | 2020 | 12 | 265 | 59 | 22.08 | 0 | – | – | – | 2 | 0 | |
| 2 | Stephanus Grobler | South Africa | 2017 | 2018 | 5 | 119 | 43* | 29.75 | 60 | 3 | 3/12 | 29.00 | 0 | 0 | |
| 3 | Nicolaas Pretorius † | South Africa | 2017 | 2019 | 10 | 112 | 48 | 11.20 | 0 | – | – | – | 9 | 0 | |
| 4 | Robert Forrest | Ireland | 2017 | 2018 | 10 | 229 | 59 | 22.90 | 0 | – | – | – | 3 | 0 | |
| 5 | Jamie Grassi † | Italy | 2017 | 2018 | 8 | 65 | 21 | 8.12 | 0 | – | – | – | 3 | 6 | |
| 6 | Harry Tector | Ireland | 2017 | 2018 | 5 | 35 | 11* | 8.75 | 84 | 8 | 4/21 | 14.00 | 2 | 0 | |
| 7 | Rory Anders | Ireland | 2017 | 2017 | 3 | 7 | 4 | 3.50 | 0 | – | – | – | 1 | 0 | |
| 8 | Gary King | Zimbabwe | 2017 | 2017 | 2 | 12 | 12 | 12.00 | 28 | 2 | 2/23 | 22.00 | 0 | 0 | |
| 9 | Yaqoob Ali | Ireland | 2017 | 2019 | 13 | 17 | 9* | 8.50 | 264 | 17 | 4/29 | 20.17 | 7 | 0 | |
| 10 | Max Neville | Ireland | 2017 | 2017 | 4 | 3 | 2 | 1.50 | 84 | 4 | 2/22 | 30.25 | 0 | 0 | |
| 11 | Aaron Cawley | Ireland | 2017 | 2021 | 12 | 42 | 19 | 14.00 | 198 | 8 | 2/15 | 34.12 | 3 | 0 | |
| 12 | Morne Bauer | Ireland | 2017 | 2018 | 4 | 26 | 14 | 6.50 | 54 | 0 | – | – | 0 | 0 | |
| 13 | Arsalan Anwar | Pakistan | 2017 | 2017 | 2 | 2 | 2 | 2.00 | 0 | – | – | – | 1 | 0 | |
| 14 | David Delany | Ireland | 2017 | 2024 | 16 | 122 | 25 | 15.25 | 303 | 15 | 3/13 | 28.20 | 4 | 0 | |
| 16 | Muhammad Sadique | Ireland | 2017 | 2017 | 1 | 12 | 12 | 12.00 | 24 | 1 | 1/22 | 22.00 | 0 | 0 | |
| 17 | Cormac Hassett | Ireland | 2017 | 2022 | 8 | 135 | 49 | 19.28 | 0 | – | – | – | 3 | 0 | |
| 18 | Stephen Doheny | Ireland | 2018 | 2025 | 18 | 569 | 150* | 35.56 | 0 | – | – | – | 3 | 0 | |
| 19 | Max Sorensen | Ireland | 2018 | 2019 | 8 | 123 | 48 | 20.50 | 186 | 9 | 2/28 | 32.11 | 3 | 0 | |
| 20 | Jack Carty | Ireland | 2018 | 2021 | 9 | 102 | 33 | 14.57 | 54 | 2 | 1/14 | 42.50 | 2 | 0 | |
| 21 | Jeremy Benton | New Zealand | 2018 | 2019 | 8 | 56 | 21 | 11.20 | 187 | 9 | 3/18 | 23.22 | 2 | 0 | |
| 22 | Murtaza Sidiqi | Ireland | 2018 | 2018 | 3 | 19 | 18 | 9.50 | 0 | – | – | – | 0 | 0 | |
| 23 | Tom Anders | Ireland | 2018 | 2018 | 3 | 1 | 1* | – | 72 | 3 | 2/42 | 37.66 | 0 | 0 | |
| 24 | Diarmuid Carey | Ireland | 2018 | 2020 | 3 | 2 | 2* | – | 48 | 1 | 1/31 | 78.00 | 1 | 0 | |
| 25 | Oliver Gunning | Ireland | 2018 | 2018 | 3 | 96 | 53 | 32.00 | 0 | – | – | – | 1 | 0 | |
| 26 | Jarred Barnes | Ireland | 2018 | 2019 | 5 | 9 | 9 | 4.50 | 114 | 3 | 2/46 | 65.33 | 2 | 0 | |
| 27 | Ruadhan Jones | Ireland | 2018 | 2020 | 5 | 3 | 2 | 1.00 | 0 | – | – | – | 2 | 0 | |
| 28 | Senan Jones | Ireland | 2018 | 2020 | 5 | 5 | 3 | 1.66 | 34 | 1 | 1/21 | 58.00 | 0 | 0 | |
| 29 | Eddie Richardson | Ireland | 2019 | 2019 | 2 | 15 | 10 | 7.50 | 42 | 3 | 3/38 | 25.33 | 0 | 0 | |
| 30 | Jonathan Garth | Ireland | 2019 | 2020 | 4 | 50 | 26 | 16.66 | 66 | 2 | 1/5 | 44.50 | 1 | 0 | |
| 31 | Jeremy Lawlor | Ireland | 2020 | 2020 | 2 | 18 | 12 | 9.00 | 0 | – | – | – | 1 | 0 | |
| 32 | Cormac McLoughlin-Gavin | Ireland | 2020 | 2020 | 2 | 19 | 16 | 9.50 | 0 | – | – | – | 0 | 0 | |
| 33 | Neil Rock † | Ireland | 2020 | 2020 | 2 | 12 | 7 | 6.00 | 0 | – | – | – | 0 | 0 | |
| 34 | Tim Tector | Ireland | 2020 | 2020 | 2 | 17 | 16 | 8.50 | 0 | – | – | – | 0 | 0 | |
| 35 | Matthew Foster | Ireland | 2020 | 2020 | 2 | 8 | 8 | 8.00 | 12 | 1 | 1/7 | 23.00 | 0 | 0 | |
| 36 | PJ Moor † | Ireland (Note: Moor has also played international cricket for Zimbabwe.) | 2021 | 2024 | 30 | 540 | 95* | 18.62 | 0 | – | – | – | 16 | 3 | |
| 37 | Murray Commins | Ireland | 2021 | 2023 | 18 | 468 | 102 | 27.52 | 0 | – | – | – | 4 | 0 | |
| 38 | Tyrone Kane | Ireland | 2021 | 2024 | 18 | 332 | 66* | 23.71 | 137 | 7 | 2/6 | 28.14 | 5 | 0 | |
| 39 | Greg Ford | Ireland | 2021 | 2021 | 7 | 79 | 26 | 26.33 | 0 | – | – | – | 3 | 0 | |
| 40 | Matt Ford | Ireland | 2021 | 2023 | 21 | 311 | 63* | 25.91 | 102 | 5 | 2/25 | 21.00 | 7 | 0 | |
| 41 | Fionn Hand | Ireland | 2021 | 2022 | 15 | 160 | 44* | 26.66 | 238 | 14 | 2/12 | 26.50 | 7 | 0 | |
| 42 | Seamus Lynch † | Ireland | 2021 | 2021 | 6 | 23 | 15 | 5.75 | 0 | – | – | – | 1 | 0 | |
| 43 | Michael Frost | Ireland | 2021 | 2025 | 27 | 13 | 6* | 6.50 | 439 | 15 | 2/10 | 39.26 | 9 | 0 | |
| 44 | Josh Manley | Ireland | 2021 | 2025 | 29 | 79 | 24 | 9.87 | 546 | 35 | 3/12 | 24.77 | 7 | 0 | |
| 45 | Mitchell Thompson | Ireland | 2021 | 2021 | 3 | 14 | 12* | 14.00 | 30 | 1 | 1/16 | 48.00 | 0 | 0 | |
| 46 | Alistair Frost | Zimbabwe | 2021 | 2024 | 14 | 225 | 83 | 28.12 | 36 | 3 | 2/15 | 18.66 | 2 | 0 | |
| 47 | Gareth Delany | Ireland | 2021 | 2024 | 14 | 337 | 60 | 28.08 | 180 | 11 | 3/10 | 20.45 | 7 | 0 | |
| 48 | Liam McCarthy | Ireland | 2021 | 2025 | 31 | 256 | 37* | 25.60 | 477 | 18 | 2/12 | 45.38 | 11 | 0 | |
| 49 | Kevin O'Brien | Ireland | 2022 | 2022 | 6 | 134 | 64* | 33.50 | 0 | – | – | – | 0 | 0 | |
| 50 | Curtis Campher | Ireland | 2022 | 2025 | 15 | 302 | 57 | 23.23 | 238 | 24 | 5/16 | 13.83 | 8 | 0 | |
| 51 | Brandon Kruger | Ireland | 2022 | 2024 | 11 | 61 | 33 | 7.62 | 54 | 2 | 1/12 | 32.50 | 5 | 0 | |
| 52 | Nicolaj Laegsgaard | Denmark | 2023 | 2024 | 8 | 75 | 27 | 12.50 | 108 | 4 | 3/16 | 30.00 | 6 | 0 | |
| 53 | Nathan McGuire | Ireland | 2023 | 2023 | 6 | 69 | 34 | 13.80 | 0 | – | – | – | 3 | 0 | |
| 54 | Conner Fletcher † | Zimbabwe | 2023 | 2023 | 3 | 45 | 28 | 15.00 | 0 | – | – | – | 2 | 0 | |
| 55 | Ben White | Ireland | 2023 | 2025 | 19 | 26 | 9 | 6.50 | 378 | 25 | 5/41 | 19.68 | 5 | 0 | |
| 56 | Michael Granger | Australia | 2023 | 2023 | 1 | 1 | 1 | 1.00 | 6 | 0 | – | – | 1 | 0 | |
| 57 | Ryan Hunter † | Ireland | 2023 | 2023 | 1 | – | – | – | 0 | – | – | – | 1 | 0 | |
| 58 | Ryan Joyce | South Africa | 2023 | 2024 | 2 | 6 | 6* | 6.00 | 6 | 0 | – | – | 2 | 0 | |
| 59 | Carson McCullough | Ireland | 2023 | 2024 | 4 | 19 | 14 | 19.00 | 66 | 4 | 4/25 | 19.75 | 0 | 0 | |
| 60 | Cian Egerton | Ireland | 2023 | 2023 | 1 | 1 | 1 | 1.00 | 12 | 0 | – | – | 0 | 0 | |
| 61 | Byron McDonough | Ireland | 2023 | 2025 | 5 | 17 | 6* | 17.00 | 99 | 6 | 3/40 | 26.16 | 1 | 0 | |
| 62 | Jordan Neill | Ireland | 2024 | 2024 | 5 | 52 | 33 | 17.33 | 0 | – | – | – | 3 | 0 | |
| 63 | John McNally | Ireland | 2024 | 2025 | 14 | 391 | 64 | 30.07 | 156 | 11 | 3/33 | 21.63 | 6 | 0 | |
| 64 | Oliver Metcalfe † | Ireland | 2024 | 2024 | 6 | 31 | 22* | 7.75 | 0 | – | – | – | 0 | 0 | |
| 65 | Ben Calitz | Ireland | 2024 | 2024 | 1 | 54 | 54* | – | 0 | – | – | – | 1 | 0 | |
| 66 | Zubair Khan | Ireland | 2024 | 2025 | 4 | 16 | 12* | 16.00 | 42 | 1 | 1/34 | 62.00 | 2 | 0 | |
| 67 | Jack Dickson | Ireland | 2024 | 2024 | 1 | – | – | – | 0 | – | – | – | 0 | 0 | |
| 68 | Harry Dyer | Ireland | 2024 | 2024 | 2 | – | – | – | 0 | – | – | – | 0 | 0 | |
| 69 | Sean McNicholl | Ireland | 2024 | 2024 | 1 | – | – | – | 18 | 0 | – | – | 1 | 0 | |
| 70 | Peter Francis | Australia | 2024 | 2024 | 2 | 29 | 15 | 14.50 | 36 | 2 | 2/25 | 25.00 | 1 | 0 | |
| 71 | Mark Andrianatos | South Africa | 2024 | 2025 | 3 | 70 | 48 | 35.00 | 0 | – | – | – | 0 | 0 | |
| 72 | Swapnil Modgil | India | 2024 | 2025 | 12 | 170 | 33 | 14.16 | 30 | 1 | 1/12 | 67.00 | 3 | 0 | |
| 73 | Matthew Weldon | Ireland | 2024 | 2024 | 1 | – | – | – | 24 | 2 | 2/16 | 8.00 | 0 | 0 | |
| 74 | Suliman Safi | Afghanistan | 2025 | 2025 | 11 | 77 | 26 | 7.70 | 42 | 1 | 1/26 | 66.00 | 4 | 0 | |
| 75 | Matthew Brewster | Ireland | 2025 | 2025 | 1 | 13 | 13 | 13.00 | 18 | 1 | 1/39 | 39.00 | 0 | 0 | |
| 76 | Philippe le Roux | Ireland | 2025 | 2025 | 11 | 266 | 80 | 26.60 | 0 | – | – | – | 4 | 0 | |
| 77 | Kian Hilton † | Ireland | 2025 | 2025 | 10 | 174 | 50 | 17.40 | 0 | – | – | – | 3 | 2 | |
| 78 | Awais Saghir | Ireland | 2025 | 2025 | 2 | 3 | 2 | 3.00 | 0 | – | – | – | 1 | 0 | |
| 79 | Bakhtyar Nabi | Afghanistan | 2025 | 2025 | 10 | 55 | 28 | 11.00 | 198 | 13 | 3/17 | 18.76 | 3 | 0 | |
| 80 | Oliver Riley | Ireland | 2025 | 2025 | 4 | 14 | 8 | 7.00 | 72 | 3 | 2/37 | 41.00 | 4 | 0 | |
