= 2018 Inter-Provincial Trophy =

Cricket tournament

- Dates: 18 May 2018 – 8 July 2018
- Administrator: Cricket Ireland
- Cricket format: Twenty20
- Tournament format: Round-robin
- Champions: Leinster Lightning (5th title)
- Participants: 4
- Matches: 12
- Most runs: Andrew Balbirnie (262)
- Most wickets: Yaqoob Ali (12)

The 2018 Inter-Provincial Trophy was the sixth edition of the Inter-Provincial Trophy, a Twenty20 cricket competition that was played in Ireland. It was held from 18 May to 8 July 2018. It was the second edition of the competition to be played with full Twenty20 status. Leinster Lightning were the defending champion. They won the tournament, with five wins from their six matches.

== Points table ==
The following teams competed:

| Team | Pld | W | L | D | NR | Pts | NRR |
|---|---|---|---|---|---|---|---|
| Leinster Lightning | 6 | 5 | 1 | 0 | 0 | 23 | +1.567 |
| Northern Knights | 6 | 3 | 3 | 0 | 0 | 15 | +0.308 |
| North West Warriors | 6 | 2 | 4 | 0 | 0 | 8 | –0.720 |
| Munster Reds | 6 | 2 | 4 | 0 | 0 | 8 | –1.179 |

== Fixtures ==
As with the Inter-Provincial Championship, and Inter-Provincial Cup, the Inter-Provincial Trophy, Ireland's national T20 provincial competition, operated as a home and away round robin. Unlike the previous two competitions, however, a fourth provincial team, Munster Reds took part, meaning each team had six fixtures in total. The first six fixtures took place across three matchdays, while the second six fixtures were held together in a single venue across three days, to form an Inter-Provincial T20 Festival.

=== Round 1 ===
18 May 2018 (D/N)
Scorecard

| North West Warriors; 166/5 (20 overs) | v | Northern Knights (H); 141 (20 overs) |
| David Rankin 51 (48); Nigel Jones 2/21 (4 overs) | | Nigel Jones 57 (44); Craig Young 4/21 (4 overs) |

North West Warriors won by 25 runs
Stormont, Belfast
Umpires: Philip Thompson and H Bingham

- Northern Knights won the toss and elected to field.
- Alistair Shields and Neil Rock (Northern Knights) both made their T20 debuts.
- Points: North West Warriors 4, Northern Knights 0.

18 May 2018 (D/N)
Scorecard

| Leinster Lightning; 160/6 (20 overs) | v | Munster Reds (H); 80 (15.4 overs) |
| Gareth Delany 77 (62); Yaqoob Ali 4/29 (4 overs) | | Jamie Grassi 21 (31); George Dockrell 3/15 (4 overs) |

Leinster Lightning won by 80 runs
Pembroke Cricket Club, Dublin
Umpires: Steve Wood and Aidan Seaver

- Leinster Lightning won the toss and elected to bat.
- Jack Carty, Murtaza Sidiqi, Tom Anders (Munster Reds) and Joe Carroll (Leinster Lightning) all made their T20 debuts.
- Points: Leinster Lightning 5, Munster Reds 0.

=== Round 2 ===
25 May 2018 (D/N)
Scorecard

| Leinster Lightning; 178/6 (20 overs) | v | Northern Knights (H); 140 (16 overs) |
| Andrew Balbirnie 79 (52); Shane Getkate 3/23 (4 overs) | | James Shannon 35 (21); Tyrone Kane 4/23 (3 overs) |

Leinster Lightning won by 38 runs
Shaw's Bridge Lower Ground, Belfast
Umpires: Michael Foster and Michael Ross

- Northern Knights won the toss and elected to bat.
- Peter Eakin (Northern Knights) made his T20 debut.
- Points: Leinster Lightning 5, Northern Knights 0.

25 May 2018 (D/N)
Scorecard

| Munster Reds; 126/8 (20 overs) | v | North West Warriors (H); 127/5 (19.1 overs) |
| Robert Forrest 29 (19); Craig Young 3/18 (4 overs) | | Stuart Thompson 36 (20); David Delany 1/13 (4 overs) |

North-West Warriors won by 5 wickets
Woodvale Road, Eglinton
Umpires: Roland Black and Graeme McCrea

- North West Warriors won the toss and elected to field.
- Diarmuid Carey (Munster Reds) made his T20 debut.
- Points:North West Warriors 4, Munster Reds 0.

=== Round 3 ===
8 June 2018 (D/N)
Scorecard

| Leinster Lightning; 99 (19.1 overs) | v | North West Warriors (H); 95/8 (20 overs) |
| Andrew Balbirnie 17 (15); Graham Kennedy 3/15 (4 overs) | | William Porterfield 38 (54); George Dockrell 3/15 (4 overs) |

Leinster won by 4 runs
Bready Cricket Club Ground, Bready
Umpires: Graeme McCrea and Roland Black

- North West Warriors won the toss and elected to field.
- Points: Leinster Lightning 4, North West Warriors 0.

8 June 2018 (D/N)
Scorecard

| Northern Knights; 195/5 (20 overs) | v | Munster Reds (H); 156/6 (20 overs) |
| Gary Wilson 80 (45); Jeremy Benton 3/18 (4 overs) | | Stephen Doheny 62* (47); James Shannon 2/29 (4 overs) |

Northern Knights won by 39 runs
Mardyke, Cork
Umpires: Paul Reynolds and Ger O'Sullivan

- Northern Knights won the toss and elected to bat.
- Points: Northern Knights 5, Munster Reds 0.

=== Round 4 ===
6 July 2018
Scorecard

| North West Warriors; 162/7 (20 overs) | v | Munster Reds (H); 163/4 (17 overs) |
| Aaron Gillespie 80* (55); Yaqoob Ali 2/27 (4 overs) | | Stephen Doheny 64 (43); Andy McBrine 2/32 (4 overs) |

Munster Reds won by 6 wickets
Pembroke Cricket Club, Dublin
Umpires: Paul Reynolds and Steve Wood

- Munster Reds won the toss and elected to field.
- Oliver Gunning, Jarred Barnes, Ruadhan Jones, Senan Jones (Munster Reds), Rishi Chopra and Marcus Poskitt (North West Warriors) all made their T20 debuts.
- Points: Munster Reds 4, North West Warriors 0.

6 July 2018 (D/N)
Scorecard

| Leinster Lightning (H); 207/5 (20 overs) | v | Northern Knights; 180/9 (20 overs) |
| Andrew Balbirnie 72 (48); Mark Adair 2/40 (4 overs) | | Shane Getkate 45 (32); Tyrone Kane 5/22 (3 overs) |

Leinster Lightning won by 27 runs
Pembroke Cricket Club, Dublin
Umpires: Paul Reynolds and Scott Richardson

- Leinster Lightning won the toss and elected to bat.
- Fionn Hand (Leinster Lightning) and James Cameron-Dow (Northern Knights) both made their T20 debuts.
- Points: Leinster Lightning 4, Northern Knights 0.

=== Round 5 ===
7 July 2018
Scorecard

| Northern Knights; 165 (20 overs) | v | Munster Reds (H); 126 (18.2 overs) |
| Adam Dennison 35 (28); Yaqoob Ali 2/12 (4 overs) | | Oliver Gunning 26 (21); Jacob Mulder 3/18 (4 overs) |

Northern Knights won by 39 runs
Pembroke Cricket Club, Dublin
Umpires: Sum Wijesundera and Bala Kailash

- Munster Reds won the toss and elected to field.
- Points: Northern Knights 5, Munster Reds 0.

7 July 2018 (D/N)
Scorecard

| Leinster Lightning (H); 182/3 (20 overs) | v | North West Warriors; 141 (18.4 overs) |
| John Anderson 76* (41); Graham Kennedy 2/20 (4 overs) | | David Rankin 37 (30); Eddie Richardson 4/25 (3.4 overs) |

Leinster won by 41 runs
Pembroke Cricket Club, Dublin
Umpires: Sum Wijesundera and Scott Richardson

- Leinster Lightning won the toss and elected to bat.
- Varun Chopra (North West Warriors) made his T20 debut.
- Points: Leinster Lightning 5, North West Warriors 0.

=== Round 6 ===
8 July 2018
Scorecard

| Northern Knights; 193/6 (20 overs) | v | North West Warriors (H); 144/5 (20 overs) |
| Greg Thompson 80 (44); Stuart Thompson 2/41 (4 overs) | | David Rankin 67 (55); Shane Getkate 2/17 (3 overs) |

Northern Knights won by 49 runs
Pembroke Cricket Club, Dublin
Umpires: Bala Kailash and Azam Baig

- Northern Knights won the toss and elected to bat.
- Points: Northern Knights 5, North West Warriors 0.

8 July 2018 (D/N)
Scorecard

| Munster Reds; 189/5 (20 overs) | v | Leinster Lightning (H); 187/6 (20 overs) |
| Oliver Gunning 53 (31); Tom Stanton 2/33 (4 overs) | | Andrew Balbirnie 61 (34); Max Sorensen 2/40 (4 overs) |

Munster Reds won by 2 runs
Pembroke Cricket Club, Dublin
Umpires: Azam Baig and William Clarke

- Munster Reds won the toss and elected to bat.
- Points: Munster Reds 4, Leinster Lightning 0.
