= List of Northern Knights grounds =

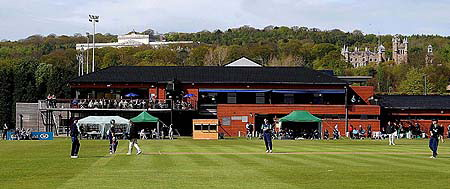
Stormont hosted Northern Knights first home First Class match in 2017.

Northern Knights was established in 2013, and accorded first-class status in 2017.

Since then, they have played first-class, List A and Twenty20 cricket at a number of different home grounds. Their first home first-class match was against North West Warriors in 2017 at Stormont in Belfast.

Northern Knights have played six first-class matches, 15 List A matches, and ten T20 matches at eight different home grounds.

The grounds that Northern Knights have used for home matches are listed below, with statistics complete through the end of the 2023 season.

== List of grounds ==
Name	Location	First	Last	No.	First	Last	No.	First	Last	No.	Refs
Name	Location	First-class			List A			Twenty20			Refs
Stormont	Belfast	5 Jun 2017 v Leinster Lightning	6 Aug 2019 v Leinster Lightning	2	28 May 2018 v North West Warriors	7 Sep 2023 v North West Warriors	12	18 May 2018 v North West Warriors	–	1	(Note: Ireland have played first-class, List A and Twenty20 matches at Civil Service Cricket Ground. Only the first-class, List A and Twenty20 matches played by Northern Knights are recorded.)
The Meadow	Downpatrick	–	–	0	4 Jun 2017 v Leinster Lightning	–	1	–	–	0	(Note: Ireland played a single first-class match at The Meadow against Scotland in 1983. Ireland played two List A matches at The Meadow in 1990 and 1997, with The Meadow hosting a further two List A matches in the 2005 ICC Trophy. Only the List A match played by the Northern Knights is recorded.)
Shaw's Bridge Lower Ground	Belfast	–	–	0	–	–	0	23 Jun 2017 v Leinster Lightning	–	1	(Note: Two List A matches were played there during the 2005 ICC Trophy.)
Middle Road	Carrickfergus	–	–	0	–	–	0	21 Jul 2017 v Munster Reds	–	1	(Note: Middle Road hosted a single List A match between Netherlands and Oman in the 2005 ICC Trophy.)
The Green	Comber	1 Aug 2017 v North West Warriors	28 May 2019 v North West Warriors	4	16 May 2021 v Leinster Lightning	–	1	1 Sep 2020 v North West Warriors	29 May 2022 v Leinster Lightning	5	(Note: Ireland have played two List A matches at The Green (1995 Benson & Hedges Cup v Kent and in the 2005 ICC Trophy v Uganda). In the 2005 ICC Trophy, Uganda and Bermuda also played a List A match there.)
The Lawn	Waringstown	–	–	0	6 Aug 2017 v North West Warriors	–	1	–	–	0	(Note: The Lawn hosted a List A match between Bermuda and the United States in the 2005 ICC Trophy. Only the List A match played by the Northern Knights is recorded.)
Circular Road	Belfast	–	–	0	–	–	0	11 Aug 2017 v North West Warriors	–	1	
Shaw's Bridge Upper Ground	Belfast	–	–	0	–	–	0	25 May 2018 v Leinster Lightning	–	1	

== See also ==
- List of cricket grounds in Ireland
- List of international men's cricket grounds in Ireland
