= 2023 Inter-Provincial Cup =

Cricket tournament

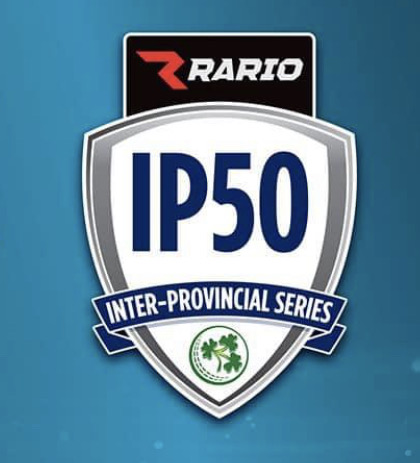
- 2023 Inter-Provincial Cup logo
- Dates: 15 May – 7 September 2023
- Administrator: Cricket Ireland
- Cricket format: List A
- Tournament format: Double round-robin
- Champions: Northern Knights (2nd title)
- Participants: 4
- Matches: 12
- Most runs: Neil Rock 253 (Northern Knights)
- Most wickets: Liam McCarthy 15 (Munster Reds)

The 2023 Inter-Provincial Cup, also known as 2023 Men's Rario Inter-Provincial Series for sponsorship reasons, was the 11th edition of the Inter-Provincial Cup, a List A cricket competition that took place in Ireland during 2023. It was the seventh edition of the competition to be played with List A status. In May 2023, Cricket Ireland confirmed the fixtures for the tournament. Munster Reds are the defending champions, having won the tournament for the first time in 2022.

In the opening match, Munster Reds began their title defence with a six wicket loss against North West Warriors. The tournament was won by the Northern Knights in the final match of the tournament; it was the second title and first time the Northern Knights had won the tournament since it gained List A status in 2017.

== Points table ==
Team	Pld	W	L	T	NR	Pts	NRR
Northern Knights	6	3	2	0	1	15	-0.159
Leinster Lightning	6	3	3	0	0	14	0.829
Munster Reds	6	3	3	0	0	14	0.439
North West Warriors	6	2	3	0	1	11	-1.340

== Fixtures ==
15 May 2023
10:45
Scorecard

Munster Reds; 149 (40.2 overs)	v	North West Warriors; 150/4 (39.1 overs)
Murray Commins 35 (51); Harry Zimmerman 4/36 (10 overs)		Shane Getkate 56* (69); Tyrone Kane 1/19 (9 overs)

North West Warriors won by 6 wickets.
The Mardyke, Cork
Umpires: Jareth McCready (Ire) and Mark Hawthorne (Ire)
Player of the match: Shane Getkate (North West Warriors)

- North West Warriors won the toss and elected to field.
- Finn Catherwood, Michael Granger, Brandon Kruger (Munster Reds), Trent McKeegan, Cameron Melly and Harry Zimmerman (North West Warriors) and all made their List A debuts.
- Points: North West Warriors 5, Munster Reds 0

16 May 2023
10:45
Scorecard

Northern Knights; 316/8 (50 overs)	v	Leinster Lightning; 250 (43.3 overs)
Neil Rock 87 (60); Barry McCarthy 2/36 (9 overs)		Lorcan Tucker 72 (57); Matthew Foster 3/26 (5.3 overs)

Northern Knights won by 66 runs
Pembroke Cricket Club, Dublin
Umpires: Jareth McCready (Ire) and Mark Hawthorne (Ire)
Player of the match: Neil Rock (Northern Knights)

- Leinster Lightning won the toss and elected to field.
- Mark Donegan, Adam Rosslee and Reuben Wilson (Leinster Lightning) all made their List A debuts.
- Points: Northern Knights 5, Leinster Lightning 0.

18 May 2023
10:45
Scorecard

Leinster Lightning; 287 (48.4 overs)	v	Munster Reds; 288/5 (48 overs)
Mark Donegan 87 (113); Michael Granger 3/46 (10 overs)		Tyrone Kane 83 (54); Reuben Wilson 5/42 (9 overs)

Munster Reds won by 5 wickets.
Pembroke Cricket Club, Dublin
Umpires: Paul Reynolds (Ire) and Aidan Seaver (Ire)
Player of the match: Tyrone Kane (Munster Reds)

- Munster Reds won the toss and elected to field.
- Matthew Weldon (Munster Reds) made his List A debut.
- Points: Munster Reds 4, Leinster Lightning 0.

22 May 2023
10:45
Scorecard

Munster Reds; 269/7 (50 overs)	v	Northern Knights; 272/7 (47.1overs)
Murray Commins 114 (122); Theo van Woerkom 3/58 (10 overs)		Morgan Topping 92 (92); Liam McCarthy 4/67 (10 overs)

Northern Knights won by 3 wickets.
Civil Service Cricket Club, Belfast
Umpires: George Brolly (Ire) and Roly Black (Ire)
Player of the match: Morgan Topping (Northern Knights)

- Northern Knights won the toss and elected to field.
- Points: Northern Knights 4, Munster Reds 0.

23 May 2023
10:45
Scorecard

North West Warriors; 183 (44.4 overs)	v	Leinster Lightning; 184/7 (45.2 overs)
Stephen Doheny 46 (55); Fionn Hand 3/51 (10 overs)		Samuel Harbinson 48 (64); Craig Young 2/46 (10 overs)

Leinster Lightning won by 3 wickets
Bready Cricket Club Ground, Bready
Umpires: Jareth McCready (Ire) and Roly Black (Ire)
Player of the match: Samuel Harbinson (Leinster Lightning)

- Leinster Lightning won the toss and elected to field.
- Samuel Harbinson (Leinster Lightning) made his List A debut.
- Points: Leinster Lightning 4, North West Warriors 0

25 May 2023
10:45
Scorecard

Northern Knights; 253/9 (50 overs)	v	North West Warriors; 257/7 (49.4 overs)
Ross Adair 76 (56); Michael Erlank 4/46 (9 overs)		Stephen Doheny 78 (100); Theo van Woerkom 2/32 (10 overs)

North West Warriors won by 3 wickets
Bready Cricket Club Ground, Bready
Umpires: Jareth McCready (Ire) and Mark Hawthrone (Ire)
Player of the match: Shane Getkate (North West Warriors)

- North West Warriors won the toss and elected to field.
- Points: North West Warriors 4, Northern Knights 0

14 August 2023
10:45
Scorecard

Leinster Lightning; 425/7 (50 overs)	v	North West Warriors; 181 (28 overs)
Lorcan Tucker 133 (93); Craig Young 4/61 (10 overs)		Liam Doherty 30 (35); Simi Singh 4/39 (6 overs)

Leinster Lightning won by 244 runs
The Hills, Milverton
Umpires: Roly Black (Ire) and Mark Hawthorne (Ire)
Player of the match: Lorcan Tucker (Leinster Lightning)

- North West Warriors won the toss and elected to field.
- Christopher De Freitas (Leinster Lightning) and Liam Doherty (North West Warriors) both made their List A debuts.
- Points: Leinster Lightning 5, North West Warriors 0.

15 August 2023
10:45
Scorecard

Northern Knights; 302/9 (50 overs)	v	Munster Reds; 250 (44.3 overs)
Neil Rock 102 (73); Josh Manley 3/45 (10 overs)		Liam McCarthy 74 (56); Theo van Woerkom 4/63 (10 overs)

Northern Knights won by 72 runs
The Mardyke, Cork
Umpires: Jonathan Kennedy (Ire) and Steve Wood (Ire)
Player of the match: Neil Rock (Northern Knights)

- Munster Reds won the toss and elected to field.
- Ryan Joyce (Munster Reds) and Jake Egan (Northern Knights) both made their List A debuts.
- Points: Northern Knights 4, Munster Reds 0.

17 August 2023
10:45
Scorecard

Leinster Lightning; 137 (31.2 overs)	v	Munster Reds; 138/3 (25.4 overs)
Gavin Hoey 37 (42); Josh Manley 4/30 (8 overs)		Tyrone Kane 71 (72); Mikey O'Reilly 1/19 (4 overs)

Munster Reds won by 7 wickets
The Mardyke, Cork
Umpires: Jonathan Kennedy (Ire) and Aidan Seaver (Ire)
Player of the match: Tyrone Kane (Munster Reds)

- Munster Reds won the toss and elected to field.
- Sean McNicholl (Leinster Lightning) and Byron McDonough (Munster Reds) both made their List A debuts.
- Points: Munster Reds 5, Leinster Lightning 0.

4 September 2023
10:45
Scorecard

Munster Reds; 306/8 (50 overs)	v	North West Warriors; 191 (40.4 overs)
Gareth Delany 98 (83); Graham Hume 2/40 (10 overs)		Cameron Melly 44 (63); Liam McCarthy 5/16 (8 overs)

Munster Reds won by 115 runs
Bready Cricket Club Ground, Bready
Umpires: Roly Black (Ire) and Jonathan Kennedy (Ire)
Player of the match: Liam McCarthy (Munster Reds)

- North West Warriors won the toss and elected to field.
- Carson McCullough (North West Warriors) made his List A debut.
- Points: Munster Reds 5, North West Warriors 0.

5 September 2023
10:45
Scorecard

Leinster Lightning; 353/9 (50 overs)	v	Northern Knights; 183 all out (30.2 overs)
Seamus Lynch 107 (63); Ruhan Pretorius 3/47 (5 overs)		Paul Stirling 66 (64); Gavin Hoey 6/26 (7.2 overs)

Leinster Lightning won by 170 runs
Civil Service Cricket Club, Belfast
Umpires: Jareth McCready (Ire) and Aidan Seaver (Ire)
Player of the match: Seamus Lynch (Leinster Lightning)

- Leinster Ligntning won the toss and elected to bat.
- Points: Leinster Lightning 5, Northern Knights 0.

7 September 2023
10:45
Scorecard

North West Warriors; 241/9 (50 overs)	v	Northern Knights; 44/2 (9 overs)
Stephen Doheny 79 (97); Theo van Woerkom 2/32 (10 overs)		Cade Carmichael 16* (17); Ryan MacBeth 2/21 (4 overs)

No result
Civil Service Cricket Club, Belfast
Umpires: George Brolly (Ire) and Mark Hawthorne

- North West Warriors won the toss and elected to bat.
- Rain stopped play after 9 overs in the Northern Knights innings.
- Points: Northern Knights 2, North West Warriors 2
