= 2023 Inter-Provincial Trophy =

Cricket tournament

- Dates: 6 June – 3 August 2023
- Administrator: Cricket Ireland
- Cricket format: Twenty20
- Tournament format: Triple round-robin
- Champions: Northern Knights (2nd title)
- Participants: 4
- Matches: 18
- Most runs: 198 Tim Tector (Leinster Lightning)
- Most wickets: 10 Trent McKeegan (North West Warriors); 10 Cain Robertson (Northern Knights)

The 2023 Inter-Provincial Trophy, also known as Rario T20 Inter-Provincial Trophy for sponsorship reasons, was the 11th edition of the Inter-Provincial Trophy, a Twenty20 cricket competition being played in Ireland in 2023. It was the seventh edition of the competition played with full Twenty20 status. The tournament was played as a series of three-day festivals between four teams, with the fixtures being confirmed by Cricket Ireland on 5 June 2023. Leinster Lightning are the defending champions having won their 7th title in 2022.

== Points Table ==
Pos	Team	Pld	W	L	T	NR	BP	Pts	NRR
1	Northern Knights (C)	9	4	1	0	4	3	27	2.046
2	North West Warriors	9	2	3	0	4	2	18	−0.081
3	Munster Reds	9	2	3	0	4	2	18	−0.322
4	Leinster Lightning	9	2	3	0	4	1	17	−1.322

Source: ESPNcricinfo
(C) Champions

Champion

== Fixtures ==
=== Round One ===
6 June 2023
11:00
Scorecard

Munster Reds; 120 (18.5 overs)	v	North West Warriors; 125/4 (16 overs)
Gareth Delany 28 (20); Trent McKeegan 4/24 (3.5 overs)		Scott MacBeth 40 (24); Ben White 1/7 (2 overs)

North West Warriors won by 6 wickets
The Mardyke, Cork
Umpires: Paul Reynolds (Ire) and Sam Hollingshead (Eng)
Player of the match: Trent McKeegan (North West Warriors)

- North West Warriors won the toss and elected to field.
- Michael Granger (North West Warriors), Corner Fletcher, Cameron Melly and Harry Zimmermann (Munster Reds) all made their T20 debuts.
- Points: North West Warriors 5, Munster Reds 0.

6 June 2023
15:30
Scorecard

Northern Knights; 236/3 (20 overs)	v	Leinster Lightning; 163 (17.1 overs)
Neil Rock 79 (26); Amish Sidhu 1/21 (2 overs)		Mark Donegan 58 (32); Thomas Mayes 4/28 (4 overs)

Northern Knights won by 73 runs
The Mardyke, Cork
Umpires: Paul Reynolds (Ire) and Sam Hollingshead (Eng)
Player of the match: Neil Rock (Northern Knights)

- Leinster Lightning won the toss and elected to field.
- Mark Donegan, Samuel Harbinson, Adam Rosslee, Amish Sidhu (Leinster Lightning), Jason van der Merwe and Theo van Woerkom (Northern Knights) all made their T20 debuts.
- Points: Northern Knights 5, Leinster Lightning 0.

7 June 2023
11:00
Scorecard

North West Warriors; 180/7 (20 overs)	v	Leinster Lightning; 99 (13.4 overs)
Shane Getkate 55 (34); Barry McCarthy 4/12 (4 overs)		Barry McCarthy 27 (15); Cain Robertson 4/20 (3.4 overs)

North West Warriors won by 81 runs
The Mardyke, Cork
Umpires: Sam Hollingshead (Eng) and Aidan Seaver (Ire)
Player of the match: Shane Getkate (North West Warriors)

- Leinster Lightning won the toss and elected to field.
- Points: North West Warriors 5, Leinster Lightning 0.

7 June 2023
15:30
Scorecard

Munster Reds; 106/5 (12 overs)	v	Northern Knights; 131/3 (10.4 overs)
Gareth Delany 32 (23); Ruhan Pretorius 3/31 (3 overs)		Ruhan Pretorius 44 (31); Ben White 2/22 (3 overs)

Northern Knights won by 7 wickets (DLS method)
The Mardyke, Cork
Umpires: Sam Hollingshead (Eng) and Aidan Seaver (Ire)
Player of the match: Ruhan Pretorius (Northern Knights)

- Munster Reds won the toss and elected to bat.
- Northern Knights were set a revised target of 129 runs from 12 overs.
- Points: Northern Knights 4, Munster Reds 0.

8 June 2023
11:00
Scorecard

North West Warriors; 164/9 (20 overs)	v	Northern Knights; 167/3 (16.1 overs)
Stephen Doheny 39 (33); Matthew Foster 4/30 (4 overs)		Morgan Topping 51 (28); Jared Wilson 1/33 (3.1 overs)

Northern Knights won by 7 wickets
The Mardyke, Cork
Umpires: Paul Reynolds (Ire) and Aidan Seaver (Ire)
Player of the match: Morgan Topping (Northern Knights)

- Northern Knights won the toss and elected to field.
- Liam Doherty (North West Warriors) made his T20 debut.
- Points: Northern Knights 5, North West Warriors 0.

8 June 2023
15:30
Scorecard

Leinster Lightning; 157/5 (20 overs)	v	Munster Reds; 159/5 (16.1 overs)
Samuel Harbinson 45 (26); Liam McCarthy 2/27 (4 overs)		Murray Commins 37 (26); Amish Sidhu 1/16 (2 overs)

Munster Reds won by 5 wickets
The Mardyke, Cork
Umpires: Paul Reynolds (Ire) and Aidan Seaver (Ire)
Player of the match: Liam McCarthy (Munster Reds)

- Leinster Lightning won the toss and elected to bat.
- Points: Munster Reds 5, Leinster Lightning 0.

=== Round Two ===
14 July 2023
11:00
Scorecard

Munster Reds; 88/7 (16 overs)	v	North West Warriors
Murray Commins 35 (29); Trent McKeegan 3/13 (3 overs)

No result
Bready Cricket Club Ground, Magheramason
Umpires: Mark Hawthorn and Jonathan Kennedy

- North West Warriors won the toss and elected to field.
- No further play was possible due to rain.
- Ryan Joyce and Carson McCullough (Munster Reds) both made their T20 debuts.
- Points: Munster Reds 2, North West Warriors 2.

14 July 2023
15:30
Scorecard

Leinster Lightning	v	Northern Knights

Match abandoned
Bready Cricket Club Ground, Magheramason
Umpires: Mark Hawthorn and Jonathan Kennedy

- No toss
- No play was possible due to rain.
- Points: Leinster Lightning 2, Northern Knights 2.

15 July 2023
Scorecard

Munster Reds	v	Northern Knights

Match abandoned
Bready Cricket Club Ground, Magheramason
Umpires: George Brolly and Roly Black

- No toss
- No play was possible due to rain.
- Points: Munster Reds 2, Northern Knights 2.

15 July 2023
Scorecare

Leinster Lightning	v	North West Warriors

Match abandoned
Bready Cricket Club Ground, Magheramason
Umpires: George Brolly and Roly Black

- No toss.
- No play was possible due to rain.
- Points: Leinster Lightning 2, North West Warriors 2.

16 July 2023
Scorecard

Leinster Lightning	v	Munster Reds

Match abandoned
Bready Cricket Club Ground, Magheramason

- No toss.
- No play was possible due to rain.
- Points: Leinster Lightning 2, Munster Reds 2.

16 July 2023
Scorecard

Northern Knights	v	North West Warriors

Match abandoned
Bready Cricket Club Ground, Magheramason

- No toss.
- No play was possible due to rain.
- Points: North West Warriors 2, Northern Knights 2.

=== Round Three ===
1 August 2023
11:00
Scorecard

Munster Reds; 167/6 (20 overs)	v	Leinster Lightning; 171/4 (15.1 overs)
Murray Commins 62 (37); Simi Singh 4/18 (4 overs)		Tim Tector 64* (37); Ben White 2/31 (4 overs)

Leinster Lightning won by 6 wickets
Sydney Parade, Dublin
Umpires: Paul Reynolds and Aidan Seaver
Player of the match: Riley Mudford (Leinster Lightning)

- Leinster Lightning won the toss and elected to field.
- Riley Mudford (Leinster Lightning) and Cain Egerton (Munster Reds) both made their T20 debuts.
- Points: Leinster Lightning 5, Munster Reds 0.

1 August 2023
15:30
Scorecard

North West Warriors; 78 (15.1 overs)	v	Northern Knights; 81/5 (13 overs)
Jared Wilson 29 (27); Matthew Humphreys 5/13 (4 overs)		Neil Rock 29 (not out) (22); Graham Hume 2/9 (4 overs)

Northern Knights won by 5 wickets
Sydney Parade, Dublin
Umpires: Paul Reynolds and Aidan Seaver
Player of the match: Matthew Humphreys (Northern Knights)

- Northern Knights won the toss and elected to field.
- Northern Knights 5, North West Warriors 0.

2 August 2023
11:00
Scorecard

Munster Reds	v	Northern Knights

Match abandoned
Sydney Parade, Dublin
Umpires: Jonathan Kennedy and Jareth McCready

- No toss
- No play was possible due to rain.
- Points: Munster Reds 2, Northern Knights 2.

2 August 2023
15:30
Scorecard

Leinster Lightning	v	North West Warriors

Match abandoned
Sydney Parade, Dublin
Umpires: Jonathan Kennedy and Jareth McCready

- No toss.
- No play was possible due to rain.
- Points: Leinster Lightning 2, North West Warriors 2.

3 August 2023
11:00
Scorecard

Munster Reds; 183/9 (20 overs)	v	North West Warriors; 145/9 (20 overs)
Alistair Frost 83 (39); Craig Young 4/26 (4 overs)		Liam Doherty 33 (27); Jared Wilson 33 (27); Ben White 3/27 (4 overs)

Munster Reds won by 38 runs
Sydney Parade, Dublin
Umpires: Paul Reynolds and Steve Wood
Player of the match: Alistair Frost (Munster Reds)

- North West Warriors won the toss and elected to field.
- Points: Munster Reds 5, North West Warriors 0.

3 August 2023
Scorecard

Northern Knights; 187/7 (20 overs)	v	Leinster Lightning; 191/5 (18.3 overs)
Neil Rock 47* (36); Fionn Hand 3/32 (4 overs)		Tim Tector 91* (56); Mark Adair 1/16 (3 overs)

Leinster Lightning won by 5 wickets
Sydney Parade, Dublin
Umpires: Paul Reynolds and Steve Wood
Player of the match: Tim Tector (Leinster Lightning)

- Leinster Lightning won the toss and elected to field.
- Points: Leinster Lightning 4, Northern Knights 0.
