= List of Leinster Lightning grounds =

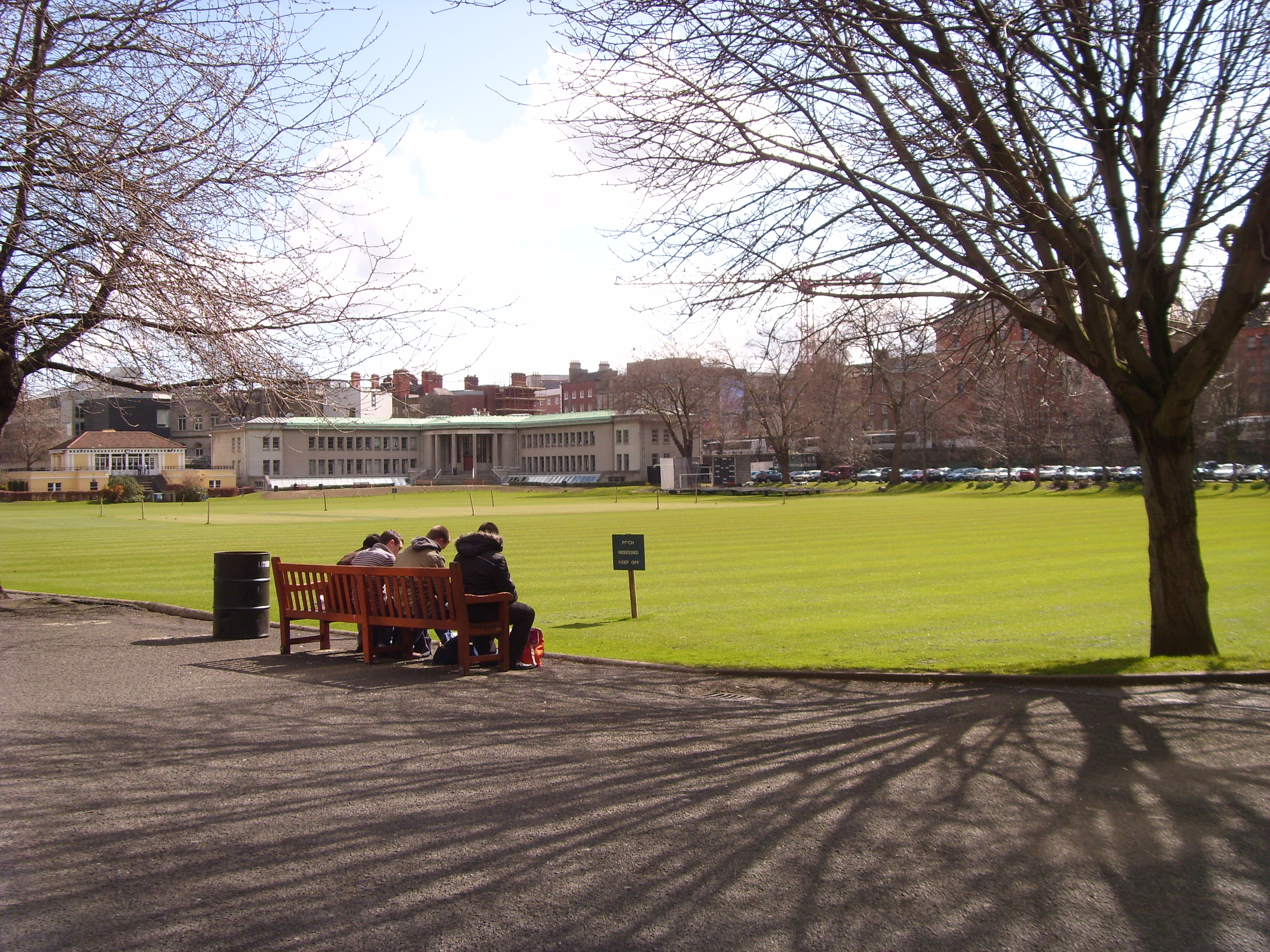
College Park (pictured) will host all Leinster Lightning home matches from 2019.

Leinster Lightning was established in 2013, and accorded first-class status in 2017.

Since then, they have played first-class, List A and Twenty20 cricket at a number of different home grounds.

Their first home first-class match was against North West Warriors in 2017 at Oak Hill Cricket Club Ground in County Wicklow. From 2019, College Park was due to become the home ground for Leinster Lightning for the 2019 and 2020 seasons, though this arrangement failed to materialise.

As of 4 September 2018, Leinster Lightning have played seven first-class matches, 18 List A matches, and 20 Twenty20 matches at eight different home grounds. The grounds that Leinster Lightning have used for home matches are listed below, with statistics complete through the end of the 2023 season.

== List of grounds ==
Name	Location	First	Last	No.	First	Last	No.	First	Last	No.	Refs
Name	Location	First-class			List A			Twenty20			Refs
The Vineyard	Skerries	–	–	0	1 May 2017 v North West Warriors	14 Aug 2023 v North West Warriors	3	–	–	0	(Note: Hosted two List A matches during the 2005 ICC Trophy. Only the List A matches played by Leinster Lighting are recorded.)
Anglesea Road	Dublin	–	–	0	–	–	0	9 Jun 2017 v Northern Knights	21 Jul 2017 v North West Warriors	3	(Note: Hosted a single List A match between Papua New Guinea and the United States during the 2005 ICC Trophy.)
Oak Hill	County Wicklow	20 Jun 2017 v North West Warriors	–	1	–	–	0	–	–	0	(Note: Ireland played a first-class match and two Twenty20 matches here against South Africa A. Only the first-class match played by Leinster Lightning is recorded.)
Castle Avenue	Dublin	5 Sep 2017 v Northern Knights	–	1	–	–	0	–	–	0	(Note: Has hosted 15 first-class matches. Only the first-class match played by Leinster Lightning is recorded.)
Observatory Lane	Dublin	–	–	0	10 Sep 2017 v Northern Knights	9 Sep 2018 v North West Warriors	2	–	–	0	(Note: Hosted two List A matches during the 2005 ICC Trophy. Only the List A matches played by Leinster Lighting are recorded.)
Sydney Parade	Dublin	1 May 2018 v North West Warriors	–	1	27 Jun 2019 v Northern Knights	18 May 2023 v Munster Reds	10	18 May 2018 v Munster Reds	3 Aug 2023 v Northern Knights	17	(Note: Has hosted seven Twenty20 matches. Only the Twenty20 matches with Leinster Lighting as the home team are recorded.)
The Village	Malahide	4 Sep 2018 v Northern Knights	30 Jul 2019 v Northern Knights	2	17 Sep 2020 v Northern Knights	28 Sep 2020 v North West Warriors	3	–	–	0	(Note: Six first-class matches have been played at the ground (including one Test match). Only the first-class match played by Leinster Lighting is recorded.)
The Inch	Balrothery	12 Aug 2019 v North West Warriors	–	1	–	–	0	–	–	0	

== See also ==
- List of cricket grounds in Ireland
- List of international men's cricket grounds in Ireland
