= Robert Forrest =

Robert Forrest may refer to:

- Robert Forrest (sculptor) (1790–1852), Scottish monumental sculptor
- Robert Forrest (priest) (died 1908), Dean of Worcester
- Robert Forrest (cricketer) (born 1993), Irish cricketer
- Robert Forrest (dramatist), Scottish playwright
- Robert Mervyn Forrest (1891–1975), Australian pastoralist and politician
- Bob Forrest (born 1961), singer

== See also ==
- Robert Forest (disambiguation)
