= The Lawn (cricket ground) =

Cricket ground in Waringstown, Northern Ireland

Ground information
- Location: Waringstown, Northern Ireland
- Coordinates: 54.4296°N 6.2997°W
- Establishment: 1851
- Capacity: 1,000
- End names
- Waring's; Clare Road

Team information
Northern Knights	(2017)
- As of 15 July 2018; Source: Ground profile

The Lawn is a cricket ground in Waringstown, County Down, Northern Ireland.

== History ==
The ground was established in 1851 on land donated by Thomas Waring, with Waringstown Cricket Club being founded in the same year. The ground is thought to be the second oldest in Ulster and is considered the Home of Ulster Cricket. The Lawn is known for its famous slanting outfield. Major cricket was first played at the ground in 2005, when Bermuda played the United States in a List A match as part of the 2005 ICC Trophy. (Note: A List A between Ireland and the United States was scheduled two days before this match, however adverse weather let to its cancellation.) A second List A match was held at the ground between Northern Knights and North West Warriors in the 2017 Inter-Provincial Cup.

== Records ==
=== List A ===
- Highest team total: 311/8 by Bermuda v United States, 2005
- Lowest team total: 167 by Northern Knights v North West Warriors, 2017
- Highest individual innings: 132 by Janeiro Tucker for Bermuda v United States, 2005
- Best bowling in an innings: 4-39 by Dwayne Leverock, as above

== See also ==
- List of Northern Knights grounds
- List of cricket grounds in Ireland
