= Craig Lewis =

Craig Lewis may refer to:

- Craig Lewis (baseball) (born 1976), Australian baseball player
- Craig Lewis (cricketer), Irish cricketer
- Craig Lewis (cyclist) (born 1985), American professional road bicycle racer
- H. Craig Lewis (1944–2013), Pennsylvania State Senator

== See also ==
- Lewis Craig (1569–1622), Scottish judge
