= Scotland A cricket team in Ireland in 2019 =

International cricket series

	Ireland A	Scotland A
- Dates: 4 – 11 June 2019
Captains	Dylan Budge	Harry Tector

Twenty20 International series

LA series

The Scotland A cricket team toured Ireland in June 2019 to play three Twenty20 matches and 4 List-A matches.

== List-A series ==
=== 1st Unofficial ODI ===
4 June 2019
11:00
Scorecard

Ireland A	v	Scotland A

Match Abandoned without a ball being bowled
Oak Hill Cricket Club Ground, County Wicklow
Umpires: Gary Blair and Azam Baig

- no toss.

=== 2nd Unofficial ODI ===
5 June 2019
11:00
Scorecard

Scotland A 252 (47.2 overs)	v	Ireland A 227 (48.4 overs)
Dylan Budge 132 (136); Craig Young 5/36 (9 overs)		Gareth Delany 50 (40); Gavin Main 3/40 (9.4 overs)

Scotland A won by 25 runs
Oak Hill Cricket Club Ground, County Wicklow
Umpires: Gary Blair and Azam Baig

- Ireland A won the toss and elected to field.

=== 3rd Unofficial ODI ===
6 June 2019
11:00
Scorecard

Scotland A 242 (44.3 overs)	v	Ireland A 243/4 (44.4 overs)
Michael Leask 110 (76); Graham Kennedy 2/16 (7 overs)		Shane Getkate 104* (95); Michael Leask 2/37 (8 overs)

Ireland A won by 6 wickets
Oak Hill Cricket Club Ground, County Wicklow
Umpires: Gary Blair and Paul Reynolds

- Scotland A won the toss and elected to bat.

=== 4th Unofficial ODI ===
7 June 2019
11:00
Scorecard

Ireland A 179/9 (35 overs)	v	Scotland A 193/6 (27.5 overs)
Lorcan Tucker 61 (86); Michael Leask 3/29 (7 overs)		George Munsey 52* (39); Peter Chase 2/33 (6 overs)

Scotland A won by 4 wickets (DLS Method)
Oak Hill Cricket Club Ground, Wicklow
Umpires: Gary Blair and Aidan Seaver

- Ireland A won the toss and elected to bat.
- Match was reduced to 35 overs per side due to rain and Scotland A were given a revised target of 191 runs in 35 overs by using the DLS method.

== Twenty20 Series ==
=== 1st Unofficial T20 ===
9 June 2019
12:00
Scorecard

Scotland A 153/9 (20 overs)	v	Ireland A 19/2 (3.4 overs)
Craig Wallace 72 (48); Craig Young 3/32 (4 overs)		Nathan McGuire 7* (7); Gavin Main 2/12 (2 overs)

No result
Oak Hill Cricket Club Ground, County Wicklow
Umpires: Michael Foster and Azam Baig

- Ireland A won the toss and elected to field.
- Rain during Ireland A's innings prevented any further play.
