= 2020 Inter-Provincial Trophy =

Cricket tournament

- Dates: 20 August – 8 September 2020
- Administrator: Cricket Ireland
- Cricket format: Twenty20
- Tournament format: Round-robin
- Champions: Leinster Lightning (6th title)
- Participants: 4
- Matches: 12
- Most runs: Kevin O'Brien (148)
- Most wickets: Simi Singh (8)

The 2020 Inter-Provincial Trophy was the eighth edition of the Inter-Provincial Trophy, a Twenty20 cricket competition played in Ireland during August and September 2020. It was the fourth edition of the competition to be played with full Twenty20 status. Northern Knights were the defending champions.

On the opening day of the tournament, Northern Knights beat North West Warriors by two runs in a match affected by the rain, and Leinster Lightning defeated Munster Reds by nine wickets with twelve overs to spare. Leinster Lightning won the tournament, to claim their sixth title, after beating Northern Knights by five wickets in the penultimate round of matches.

The final two fixtures of the tournament, scheduled to be played on 8 September 2020, were both called off a day before they were meant to be played. The match between Munster Reds and Northern Knights was cancelled because of a possible COVID-19 "chain of transmission" linked back to a cancelled match in the 2020 Bob Willis Trophy in England a few days prior. The other match, between North West Warriors and Leinster Lightning, was called off due to a wet outfield, meaning only half of the scheduled twelve matches finished with a result.

== Background ==
Originally the tournament was scheduled to be held from 12 June to 3 August 2020, with competition split into two halves, each branded as a T20 Festival. The first half was scheduled to be played in June, and the second half was scheduled to be played in August.

On 26 March 2020, Cricket Ireland confirmed that domestic competitions would be pushed back to 28 May 2020 at the earliest, due to the COVID-19 pandemic. Government restrictions prevented any cricket, including training, from starting before June 2020. The Irish government announced a provisional date of 20 July 2020 for a possible restart of sporting fixtures in the country. Plans of a possible start of domestic cricket in Ireland, with matches taking place during August and September, were looked at in July 2020. On 22 July 2020, Cricket Ireland confirmed the revised fixtures for the tournament. On 15 August 2020, all the teams confirmed their squads for the tournament.

== Points table ==
The following teams competed:

Team	Pld	W	L	T	NR	Pts	NRR
Leinster Lightning	6	4	0	0	2	22	+2.608
Northern Knights	6	2	1	0	3	15	+0.753
Munster Reds	6	0	2	0	4	8	–4.111
North West Warriors	6	0	3	0	3	6	–2.013

== Fixtures ==
20 August 2020
Scorecard

North West Warriors; 132/6 (20 overs)	v	Northern Knights; 52/3 (7.4 overs)
Graham Hume 47* (40); Graeme McCarter 2/17 (4 overs)		Paul Stirling 41* (24); Graham Hume 2/15 (3 overs)

Northern Knights won by 2 runs (DLS method)
Bready Cricket Club Ground, Bready
Umpires: Mark Hawthorne and Alan Neill

- Northern Knights won the toss and elected to field.
- Rain during Northern Knights innings prevented any further play.
- Will Smale (North West Warriors), Ross Adair and CJ van der Walt (Northern Knights) all made their T20 debuts.
- Points: Northern Knights 4, North West Warriors 0.

20 August 2020
Scorecard

Munster Reds; 76 (19.3 overs)	v	Leinster Lightning; 77/1 (8 overs)
Jonathan Garth 26 (37); Gareth Delany 3/8 (4 overs)		Kevin O'Brien 46* (27); Jonathan Garth 1/5 (1 over)

Leinster won by 9 wickets
Pembroke Cricket Club, Dublin
Umpires: Steve Wood and Paul Reynolds

- Leinster Lightning won the toss and elected to field.
- Matthew Foster and Cormac McLoughlin-Gavin (Munster Reds) both made their T20 debuts.
- Points: Leinster Lightning 5, Munster Reds 0.

25 August 2020
Scorecard

Northern Knights	v	Leinster Lightning

Match abandoned
The Green, Comber
Umpires: Mark Hawthorne and Roland Black

- No toss.
- The match was called off due to the impact of Storm Francis.
- Points: Leinster Lightning 2, Northern Knights 2.

27 August 2020
Scorecard

Leinster Lightning; 124/4 (12 overs)	v	North West Warriors; 104/8 (12 overs)
Kevin O'Brien 82 (37); Graham Hume 3/18 (3 overs)		William Porterfield 50 (30); Simi Singh 3/11 (2 overs)

Leinster Lightning won by 24 runs (DLS method)
Pembroke Cricket Club, Dublin
Umpires: Paul Reynolds and Alan Neill

- North West Warriors won the toss and elected to field.
- North West Warriors were set a revised target of 129 runs from 12 overs due to rain.
- Points: Leinster Lightning 4, North West Warriors 0.
- Greg Ford (Leinster Lightning) made his T20 debut.

27 August 2020
Scorecard

Northern Knights	v	Munster Reds

Match abandoned
Stormont, Belfast
Umpires: Mark Hawthorne and Roland Black

- No toss.
- No play was possible due to rain.
- Points: Northern Knights 2, Munster Reds 2.

1 September 2020
Scorecard

North West Warriors; 115 (20 overs)	v	Northern Knights; 119/2 (14.2 overs)
Ryan Hunter 37 (38); Mark Adair 4/14 (4 overs)		James McCollum 79* (53); Andy McBrine 1/15 (4 overs)

Northern Knights won by 8 wickets
The Green, Comber
Umpires: Roland Black and Alan Neill

- North West Warriors won the toss and elected to bat.
- Ryan Hunter (North West Warriors) made his T20 debut.
- Points: Northern Knights 5, North West Warriors 0.

1 September 2020
Scorecard

Munster Reds; 76/7 (13 overs)	v	Leinster Lightning; 77/3 (9.4 overs)
Jonathan Garth 22 (17); George Dockrell 2/12 (3 overs)		Lorcan Tucker 28* (24); Matthew Foster 1/7 (1 over)

Leinster Lightning won by 7 wickets
The Mardyke, Mardyke
Umpires: Paul Reynolds and Aidan Seaver

- Leinster Lightning won the toss and elected to field.
- The match was reduced to 13 overs per side due to a wet outfield.
- James Newland (Leinster Lightning) made his T20 debut.
- Points: Leinster Lightning 5, Munster Reds 0.

3 September 2020
Scorecard

North West Warriors	v	Munster Reds

Match abandoned
The Inch, Dublin, Balrothery
Umpires: Paul Reynolds and Roland Black

- No toss.
- No play was possible due to rain.
- Points: Munster Reds 2, North West Warriors 2.

3 September 2020
Scorecard

Munster Reds	v	North West Warriors

Match abandoned
The Inch, Dublin, Balrothery
Umpires: Paul Reynolds and Roland Black

- No toss.
- No play was possible due to rain.
- Points: Munster Reds 2, North West Warriors 2.

3 September 2020
Scorecard

Northern Knights; 128 (20 overs)	v	Leinster Lightning; 131/5 (18.5 overs)
Harry Tector 24 (19); Simi Singh 3/15 (4 overs)		Simi Singh 39* (34); Ruhan Pretorius 1/8 (2 overs)

Leinster Lightning won by 5 wickets
Pembroke Cricket Club, Dublin
Umpires: Mark Hawthorne and Alan Neill

- Leinster Lightning won the toss and elected to field.
- Josh Manley (Northern Knights) made his T20 debut.
- Points: Leinster Lightning 4, Northern Knights 0.

8 September 2020
Scorecard

Munster Reds	v	Northern Knights

Match abandoned
The Mardyke, Mardyke

- No toss.
- The match was called off on the previous day due to a COVID-19 related issue.
- Points: Munster Reds 2, Northern Knights 2.

8 September 2020
Scorecard

North West Warriors	v	Leinster Lightning

Match abandoned
Bready Cricket Club Ground, Bready

- No toss.
- The match was called off on the previous day due to a wet outfield.
- Points: North West Warriors 2, Leinster Lightning 2.
