= 2024 Netherlands Women's Tri-Nation Series =

The 2024 Netherlands Women's Tri-Nation Series was a pair of cricket series that was contested by the national teams of Netherlands, Scotland and Papua New Guinea in August 2024. The teams contested a One Day International (ODI) series in the format of a double round-robin, which was followed by a Twenty20 International (T20I) series that was played as a single round-robin.

== Squads ==
Netherlands	Papua New Guinea	Scotland
Babette de Leede (c, wk); Merel Dekeling; Caroline de Lange; Hannah Landheer; Eva Lynch; Phebe Molkenboer; Frederique Overdijk; Robine Rijke; Robin Schmidt; Silver Siegers; Annemijn Thomson; Annemijn van Beuge; Myrthe van den Raad; Carlijn van Koolwijk; Iris Zwilling	Brenda Tau (c, wk); Vicky Araa; Vicky Buruka; Kevau Frank; Mahuta Jayphert; Sibona Jimmy; Dika Lohia; Lakshmi Rajadurai; Tanya Ruma; Pauke Siaka; Henao Thomas; Geua Tom; Isabel Toua; Naoani Vare	Abtaha Maqsood (c); Chloe Abel; Abbi Aitken-Drummond; Olivia Bell; Darcey Carter; Priyanaz Chatterji; Maryam Faisal (wk); Gabriella Fontenla; Katherine Fraser; Saskia Horley; Lorna Jack (wk); Megan McColl; Niamh Muir; Nayma Sheikh; Ellen Watson (wk)

== ODI series ==
2024 Netherlands ODI Tri-Nation Series
- Date: 5–12 August 2024
- Location: Netherlands
- Result: Scotland won the series
Teams
Netherlands	Papua New Guinea	Scotland
Captains
Babette de Leede	Brenda Tau	Abtaha Maqsood
Most runs
Phebe Molkenboer (119)	Naoani Vare (116)	Saskia Horley (214)
Most wickets
Annemijn van Beuge (8) Iris Zwilling (8)	Sibona Jimmy (5)	Abtaha Maqsood (10)

=== Points table ===
Pos	Team	Pld	W	L	NR	Pts	NRR
1	Scotland	4	3	1	0	6	0.803
2	Netherlands	4	3	1	0	6	0.323
3	Papua New Guinea	4	0	4	0	0	−1.189

Source: ESPNcricinfo

=== Fixtures ===
==== 1st ODI ====
5 August 2024
11:00
Scorecard

Papua New Guinea; 148 (35.3 overs)	v	Netherlands; 149/7 (37.1 overs)
Henao Thomas 30 (32); Hannah Landheer 3/26 (9.3 overs)		Robine Rijke 60 (75); Vicky Buruka 2/22 (7 overs)

Netherlands won by 3 wickets
Sportpark Maarschalkerweerd, Utrecht
Umpires: Jareth McCready (Ire) and Maulik Prabhudesai (Ned)
Player of the match: Robine Rijke (Ned)

- Netherlands won the toss and elected to field.

==== 2nd ODI ====
6 August 2024
11:00
Scorecard

Scotland; 258/6 (50 overs)	v	Papua New Guinea; 196 (46.1 overs)
Saskia Horley 100 (121); Isabel Toua 1/31 (6 overs)		Pauke Siaka 44 (49); Saskia Horley 4/24 (10 overs)

Scotland won by 62 runs
Sportpark Maarschalkerweerd, Utrecht
Umpires: Jareth McCready (Ire) and Maulik Prabhudesai (Ned)
Player of the match: Saskia Horley (Sco)

- Papua New Guinea won the toss and elected to field.
- Abbi Aitken-Drummond and Gabriella Fontenla (Sco) both made their ODI debuts.
- Saskia Horley became the first cricketer for Scotland to score a century in women's ODIs.

==== 3rd ODI ====
8 August 2024
11:00
Scorecard

Scotland; 180 (41.1 overs)	v	Netherlands; 181/7 (40.4 overs)
Darcey Carter 86 (110); Iris Zwilling 4/31 (8.1 overs)		Babette de Leede 33 (55); Abtaha Maqsood 3/35 (9 overs)

Netherlands won by 3 wickets
VRA Cricket Ground, Amstelveen
Umpires: Maulik Prabhudesai (Ned) and Jacques Westerberg (Ned)
Player of the match: Iris Zwilling (Ned)

- Scotland won the toss and elected to bat.
- Carlijn van Koolwijk (Ned) made her ODI debut.

==== 4th ODI ====
9 August 2024
11:00
Scorecard

Papua New Guinea; 191 (48.5 overs)	v	Netherlands; 192/9 (47.2 overs)
Tanya Ruma 79 (96); Annemijn van Beuge 5/37 (9.5 overs)		Phebe Molkenboer 75 (137); Henao Thomas 3/36 (10 overs)

Netherlands won by 1 wicket
VRA Cricket Ground, Amstelveen
Umpires: Jareth McCready (Ire) and Jacques Westerberg (Ned)
Player of the match: Phebe Molkenboer (Ned)

- Netherlands won the toss and elected to field.
- Annemijn van Beuge (Ned) took her first five-wicket haul in ODIs.

==== 5th ODI ====
11 August 2024
11:00
Scorecard

Papua New Guinea; 133 (40.3 overs)	v	Scotland; 134/6 (27.2 overs)
Naoani Vare 44 (87); Darcey Carter 3/20 (8 overs)		Saskia Horley 71* (77); Sibona Jimmy 3/19 (5.2 overs)

Scotland won by 4 wickets
VRA Cricket Ground, Amstelveen
Umpires: Jareth McCready (Ire) and Jacques Westerberg (Ned)
Player of the match: Saskia Horley (Sco)

- Scotland won the toss and elected to field.

==== 6th ODI ====
12 August 2024
11:00
Scorecard

Scotland; 187 (49.5 overs)	v	Netherlands; 153 (44.4 overs)
Saskia Horley 43 (70); Annemijn van Beuge 3/29 (8.5 overs)		Frederique Overdijk 34 (67); Katherine Fraser 2/20 (7.4 overs)

Scotland won by 34 runs
VRA Cricket Ground, Amstelveen
Umpires: Jareth McCready (Ire) and Maulik Prabhudesai (Ned)
Player of the match: Katherine Fraser (Sco)

- Scotland won the toss and elected to bat.

== T20I series ==
2024 Netherlands T20I Tri-Nation Series
- Date: 14–16 August 2024
- Location: Netherlands
- Result: Scotland won the series
Teams
Netherlands	Papua New Guinea	Scotland
Captains
Babette de Leede	Brenda Tau	Abtaha Maqsood
Most runs
Iris Zwilling (65)	Brenda Tau (39)	Darcey Carter (84)
Most wickets
Caroline de Lange (2)	Vicky Buruka (3); Sibona Jimmy (3)	Chloe Abel (5)

=== Points table ===
Pos	Team	Pld	W	L	NR	Pts	NRR
1	Scotland	2	2	0	0	4	1.075
2	Netherlands	2	0	1	1	1	−1.350
3	Papua New Guinea	2	0	1	1	1	−0.800

Source: ESPNcricinfo

=== Fixtures ===
==== 1st T20I ====
14 August 2024
14:00
Scorecard

Netherlands; 66/1 (8.2 overs)	v	Papua New Guinea
Iris Zwilling 42* (28); Sibona Jimmy 1/11 (2 overs)

No result
VRA Cricket Ground, Amstelveen
Umpires: Ashraf Din (Ned) and Jnanesh Kolli (Ned)

- Papua New Guinea won the toss and elected to field.
- No further play was possible due to rain.
- Mahuta Jayphert (PNG) made her T20I debut.

==== 2nd T20I ====
15 August 2024
14:00
Scorecard

Scotland; 117/7 (20 overs)	v	Papua New Guinea; 101 (19.3 overs)
Priyanaz Chatterji 32 (31); Vicky Buruka 3/23 (4 overs)		Brenda Tau 39 (33); Chloe Abel 3/14 (4 overs)

Scotland won by 16 runs
VRA Cricket Ground, Amstelveen
Umpires: Adwait Deshpande (Ned) and Jnanesh Kolli (Ned)
Player of the match: Darcey Carter (Sco)

- Scotland won the toss and elected to bat.

==== 3rd T20I ====
16 August 2024
14:00
Scorecard

Scotland; 145/4 (20 overs)	v	Netherlands; 118/9 (20 overs)
Darcey Carter 54* (36); Caroline de Lange 2/15 (4 overs)		Iris Zwilling 23 (36); Nayma Sheikh 4/14 (4 overs)

Scotland won by 27 runs
VRA Cricket Ground, Amstelveen
Umpires: Adwait Deshpande (Ned) and Ashraf Din (Ned)
Player of the match: Nayma Sheikh (Sco)

- Netherlands won the toss and elected to field.
