= Haggan =

Haggan is a surname. Notable people with the surname include:

- Alexander Haggan (born 1992), Irish cricketer
- David Haggan, American politician
- John Haggan (1896–1982), English footballer
- Kimberly Haggan, American politician
- Mario Haggan (born 1980), American football player
- Mark Haggan, British businessman and activist

== See also ==
- Hagan (surname)
