= Robert Forest =

Robert Forest may refer to:

- Robert Forest (cyclist) (born 1961), French former cyclist
- Robert Forest (architect), American architect with Adrian Smith + Gordon Gill Architecture

== See also ==
- Robert De Forest (disambiguation)
- Robert Forrest (disambiguation)
