= Mark Donegan =

Irish cricketer

Personal information
- Full name: Mark Eoghan Donegan
- Born: 22 December 1998 (age 27); Ireland
- Batting: Left-handed
- Role: Wicket-keeper

Domestic team information
- Years: Team
- 2023–present: Leinster Lightning

Career statistics
Competition	List A	Twenty20
Matches	3	5
Runs scored	109	80
Batting average	36.33	16.00
100s/50s	–/1	–/1
Top score	87	58
Catches/stumpings	6/1	1/–
- Source: Cricinfo, 23 September 2023

Mark Eoghan Donegan (born 22 December 1998) is an Irish cricketer.

From County Dublin, Donegan's father was a former captain of the Laois Gaelic football team. He began his education at Loughshinny Primary School in Skerries, where he first became interested in cricket during a coaching session carried out Rush Cricket Club. From there, he attended Gormanston College, before matriculating to Trinity College Dublin, gaining a master's degree in engineering.

Donegan initially joined Rush, but moved to The Hills. He played for the Ireland under-19 team at the 2018 Under-19 World Cup in New Zealand, making six Under-19 One Day International appearances. Having played for Leinster at youth level, Donegan was included in Leinster Lightning's core squad for the 2023 season.

He made his debut for Leinster Lightning in List A one-day cricket in the 2023 Inter-Provincial Cup against Northern Knights at Dublin. He made two further appearances in the competition, against Munster Reds and the North West Warriors; against Munster, he recorded his maiden one-day half century with a score of 87.

Donegan also made his debut in Twenty20 cricket in the 2023 Inter-Provincial Trophy against the Northern Knights at Cork, making 58 runs in a losing cause. He made four further appearances in that seasons competition.
