= 2017 Inter-Provincial Trophy =

Cricket tournament

- Dates: 26 May 2017 – 11 August 2017
- Administrator: Cricket Ireland
- Cricket format: Twenty20
- Tournament format: Round-robin
- Champions: Leinster Lightning (4th title)
- Participants: 4
- Matches: 12
- Most runs: James Shannon (251)
- Most wickets: Craig Young (11)

The 2017 Inter-Provincial Trophy was the fifth edition of the Inter-Provincial Trophy, a Twenty20 cricket competition played in Ireland. It was held from 26 May to 11 August 2017.

It was the first edition of the competition to be played with full Twenty20 status, following the outcome of a meeting by the International Cricket Council (ICC) in October 2016. In April 2017, Cricket Ireland approved the participation of a fourth team, Munster Reds, for the tournament.

Leinster Lightning won the tournament, after beating Munster Reds by five wickets in the final round of fixtures.

== Points table ==
The following teams competed:

Team	Pld	W	L	D	NR	Pts	NRR
Leinster Lightning	6	5	1	0	0	22	+1.637
North West Warriors	6	3	2	0	1	14	–0.221
Northern Knights	6	3	3	0	0	13	+0.273
Munster Reds	6	0	5	0	1	2	–2.245

Champions

== Fixtures ==
=== Round 1 ===
26 May 2017 (D/N)
Scorecard

Leinster Lightning; 153/8 (20 overs)	v	North West Warriors (H); 97 (17 overs)
Andrew Balbirnie 44 (31); Andy McBrine 3/19 (4 overs)		Jonathan Robinson 38* (37); Eddie Richardson 3/11 (3 overs)

Leinster Lightning won by 56 runs
Bready Cricket Club Ground, Bready
Umpires: Noel Dunn and Graeme McCrea

- Leinster Lightning won the toss and elected to bat.
- Peter Chase, Gareth Delany, Bobby Gamble, Eddie Richardson, Simi Singh (Leinster Lightning); Andrew Britton, Rickie-Lee Dougherty, Steve Vijay Lazars, William McClintock, Jonathan Robinson and Johnny Thompson (North West Warriors) all made their T20 debuts.
- Points: Leinster Lightning 5, North West Warriors 0.

26 May 2017 (D/N)
Scorecard

Northern Knights; 123/8 (15 overs)	v	Munster Reds (H); 92/5 (13 overs)
Adam Dennison 33 (21); Stephanus Grobler 3/12 (3 overs)		Jack Tector 59 (40); Jacob Mulder 2/8 (2 overs)

Northern Knights won by 8 runs (D/L method)
Mardyke, Cork
Umpires: Bala Kailash and Steve Wood

- Munster Reds won the toss and elected to field.
- Rain set Munster Reds a revised target of 101 runs from 13 overs.
- This was Munster Reds first match in the Inter-Provincial Trophy.
- Rory Anders, Aaron Cawley, Robert Forrest, Jamie Grassi, Stephanus Grobler, Gary King, Max Neville, Nicolaas Pretorius, Harry Tector, Jack Tector, Yaqoob Ali (Munster Reds); Adam Dennison, Shane Getkate, Michael Gilmour, Craig Lewis, Lee Nelson and Nikolai Smith (Northern Knights) all made their T20 debuts.
- Points: Northern Knights 4, Munster Reds 0.

=== Round 2 ===
9 June 2017 (D/N)
Scorecard

Northern Knights; 157/8 (20 overs)	v	Leinster Lightning (H); 158/3 (17.1 overs)
Greg Thompson 56 (40); Simi Singh 3/19 (4 overs)		Andy Balbirnie 71* (44); Shane Getkate 2/47 (4 overs)

Leinster Lightning won by 7 wickets
Anglesea Road Cricket Ground, Dublin
Umpires: Azam Baig and Paul Reynolds

- Northern Knights won the toss and elected to bat.
- Tom Stanton (Leinster Lightning) and Nathan Smith (Northern Knights) both made their T20 debuts.
- Points: Leinster Lightning 4, Northern Knights 0.

9 June 2017 (D/N)
Scorecard

Munster Reds (H)	v	North West Warriors

Match abandoned
Mardyke, Cork
Umpires: Bala Kailash and Aidan Seaver

- No toss.
- Rain prevented any play.
- Points: Munster Reds 2, North West Warriors 2.

=== Round 3 ===
16 June 2017 (D/N)
Scorecard

Leinster Lightning (H); 247/4 (20 overs)	v	Munster Reds; 188/9 (20 overs)
Simi Singh 109 (53); Yaqoob Ali 2/52 (4 overs)		Robert Forrest 59 (39); Gareth Delany 3/25 (4 overs)

Leinster Lightning won by 59 runs
Anglesea Road Cricket Ground, Dublin
Umpires: Bala Kailash and Sum Wijesundera

- Munster Reds won the toss and elected to field.
- Andrew Sheridan (Leinster Lightning), Arslan Anwar, Morne Bauer and David Delany (Munster Reds) all made their T20 debuts.
- Points: Leinster Lightning 4, Munster Reds 0.

16 June 2017 (D/N)
Scorecard

Northern Knights; 118 (19.2 overs)	v	North West Warriors (H); 122/7 (19.1 overs)
Graeme McCarter 32 (19); Craig Young 5/15 (3.2 overs)		Johnny Thompson 39 (46); Nikolai Smith 2/23 (2.1 overs)

North West Warriors won by 3 wickets
New Strabane Park, Strabane
Umpires: Roland Black and Noel Dunn

- Northern Knights won the toss and elected to bat.
- Aaron Gillespie (North West Warriors), Jamie Holmes and Robert McKinley (Northern Knights) all made their T20 debuts.
- Points: North West Warriors 4, Northern Knights 0.

=== Round 4 ===
23 June 2017 (D/N)
Scorecard

Leinster Lightning; 136/9 (20 overs)	v	Northern Knights (H); 128 (20 overs)
Kevin O'Brien 19 (11); Shane Getkate 2/16 (2 overs)		Graeme McCarter 42 (43); Peter Chase 4/11 (4 overs)

Leinster Lightning won by 8 runs
Shaw's Bridge Lower Ground, Belfast
Umpires: Gary Blair and Michael Ross

- Leinster Lightning won the toss and elected to bat.
- Jamie Magowan and James McCollum (Northern Knights) both made their T20 debuts.
- Points: Leinster Lightning 4, Northern Knights 0.

23 June 2017 (D/N)
Scorecard

North West Warriors (H); 142/5 (20 overs)	v	Munster Reds; 117 (17.4 overs)
Andy McBrine 52* (25); Harry Tector 4/21 (4 overs)		David Delany 25 (18); David Scanlon 3/19 (2.4 overs)

North West Warriors won by 25 runs
Woodvale Road, Eglinton
Umpires: Roland Black and Noel Dunn

- Munster Reds won the toss and elected to field.
- Muhammad Sadique (cricketer) (Munster Reds), Ross Allen, Graham Kennedy and David Scanlon (North West Warriors) all made their T20 debuts.
- Points: North West Warriors 4, Munster Reds 0.

=== Round 5 ===
21 July 2017 (D/N)
Scorecard

Leinster Lightning (H); 118 (19.3 overs)	v	North West Warriors; 119/3 (19.1 overs)
Lorcan Tucker 44 (29); Craig Young 5/22 (3.3 overs)		Stuart Thompson 43 (49); Kevin O'Brien 1/25 (4 overs); George Dockrell 1/25 (4 overs)

North West Warriors won by 7 wickets
Anglesea Road Cricket Ground, Dublin
Umpires: Gordon Black and Azam Baig

- Leinster Lightning won the toss and elected to bat.
- Points: North West Warriors 4, Leinster Lightning 0.

21 July 2017 (D/N)
Scorecard

Northern Knights (H); 209/5 (20 overs)	v	Munster Reds; 154/9 (20 overs)
James Shannon 67 (31); David Delany 1/29 (4 overs)		Stephanus Grobler 43* (31); Robert McKinley 3/18 (4 overs)

Northern Knights won by 55 runs
Middle Road, Carrickfergus
Umpires: Alan Neill and Philip Thompson

- Munster Reds won the toss and elected to field.
- Cormac Hassett (Munster Reds) and Christopher Dougherty (Northern Knights) both made their T20 debuts.
- Points: Northern Knights 4, Munster Reds 0.

=== Round 6 ===
11 August 2017 (D/N)
Scorecard

North West Warriors; 123/4 (20 overs)	v	Northern Knights (H); 124/4 (19.1 overs)
David Barr 41 (48); Gary Kidd 2/19 (3 overs)		James Shannon 62 (43); Andy McBrine 2/24 (4 overs)

Northern Knights won by 6 wickets
Circular Road, Belfast
Umpires: H Bingham and Mark Hawthorne

- North West Warriors won the toss and elected to bat.
- Adam Berry, Alexander Haggan, John Matchett (Northern Knights); David Barr, Aaron Heywood (North West Warriors) all made their T20 debuts.
- Points: Northern Knights 4, North West Warriors 0.

11 August 2017 (D/N)
Scorecard

Munster Reds (H); 118 (19.2 overs)	v	Leinster Lightning; 120/5 (13.4 overs)
Stephan Grobler 36 (28); Josh Little 3/17 (3.2 overs)		Gareth Delany 40 (22); Yaqoob Ali 3/25 (4 overs)

Leinster Lightning won by 5 wickets
Mardyke, Cork
Umpires: Paul Reynolds and Steve Wood

- Munster Reds won the toss and elected to bat.
- Stephen Doheny (Leinster Lightning) made his T20 debut.
- Points: Leinster Lightning 4, Munster Reds 0.
