= Circular Road, Belfast =

Cricket ground in Northern Ireland

Circular Road
Ground information
- Location: Belfast, Northern Ireland
- Coordinates: 54.6040°N 5.8583°W
- Establishment: c. 1981

Team information
Northern Knights	(2017)
- As of 16 July 2018; Source: Ground profile

Circular Road is a cricket ground in Belfast, Northern Ireland.

== History ==
The home ground of the C.I.Y.M.S. Cricket Club, Circular Road has held one major cricket match, when Northern Knights played North West Warriors in a Twenty20 match as part of the 2017 Inter-Provincial Trophy. Northern Knights won the match by six wickets, with James Shannon contributing 62 runs in the Knights chase.

== See also ==
- List of Northern Knights grounds
- List of cricket grounds in Ireland
