= Adam Berry (disambiguation) =

Adam Berry (born 1966) is an American television and film composer.

Adam Berry may also refer to:

- Adam Berry (cricketer) (born 1992), Irish cricketer
- Adam Berry (soccer) (born 1997), Australian soccer player
- Adam Berry (high jumper), winner of the high jump at the 1942 USA Indoor Track and Field Championships
