= List of North West Warriors grounds =

North West Warriors cricket team were established in 2013 to represent the Northern Cricket Union in Ireland, and accorded first-class status in 2017, playing in the Irish Inter-Provincial Championship.

Since then, they have played first-class, List A and Twenty20 cricket at a number of different home grounds. Their first home first-class match was against Northern Knights in 2017 at Woodvale Road in Eglinton, County Londonderry.

North West Warriors have played five home first-class matches, 13 List A matches, and 11 Twenty20 matches at three different home grounds.

The grounds that North West Warriors have used for home matches are listed below, with statistics complete through the end of the 2023 season.

== List of grounds ==
Name	Location	First	Last	No.	First	Last	No.	First	Last	No.	Refs
Name	Location	First-class			List A			Twenty20			Refs
Bready	Magheramason	30 Aug 2017 v Leinster Lightning	17 Jun 2019 v Leinster Lightning	4	2 Jul 2017 v Leinster Lightning	4 Sep 2023 v Munster Reds	7	26 May 2017 v Leinster Lightning	15 Jul 2023 v Leinster Lightning	8	(Note: 27 Twenty20 matches have been played here (including 12 with Twenty20 International status). Ireland have played one ODI at the ground. Only the List A and Twenty20 matches played by North West Warriors are recorded in the table.)
New Strabane Park	Strabane	–	–	0	29 May 2017 v Northern Knights	–	1	16 Jun 2017 v Northern Knights	–	1	
Woodvale Road	Eglinton	30 May 2017 v Northern Knights	–	1	19 Jun 2018 v Leinster Lightning	25 May 2021 v Leinster Lightning	5	23 Jun 2017 v Munster Reds	25 May 2018 v Munster Reds	2	(Note: Ireland have played three first-class matches here. Only the first-class match played by North West Warriors is recorded. Ireland have played three List A matches here. Only the List A matches played by North West Warrior are recorded. Ireland played a single Twenty20 match here against Bangladesh A in 2008. Only the Twenty20 matches played by North West Warriors are recorded.)

== See also ==
- List of cricket grounds in Ireland
- List of international men's cricket grounds in Ireland
