= New Strabane Park =

Cricket ground in Northern Ireland

Ground information
- Location: Strabane, Northern Ireland
- Coordinates: 54.8333°N 7.4664°W
- Establishment: 2008

Team information
North West Warriors	(2017)
- As of 15 July 2018; Source: Ground profile

New Strabane Park is a cricket ground in Strabane, Northern Ireland.

== History ==
The ground was established in 2008 as a replacement for the original Strabane Park, which is now the site of an ASDA superstore. The first major match played on the ground came nine years later in a List A match between North West Warriors and Northern Knights in the 2017 Inter-Provincial Cup, with the match ending in no result due to rain. Later that season North West Warriors played a Twenty20 match at the ground against Northern Knights in the Inter-Provincial Trophy.

== See also ==
- List of North West Warriors grounds
- List of cricket grounds in Ireland
