= List of cricket grounds in Ireland =

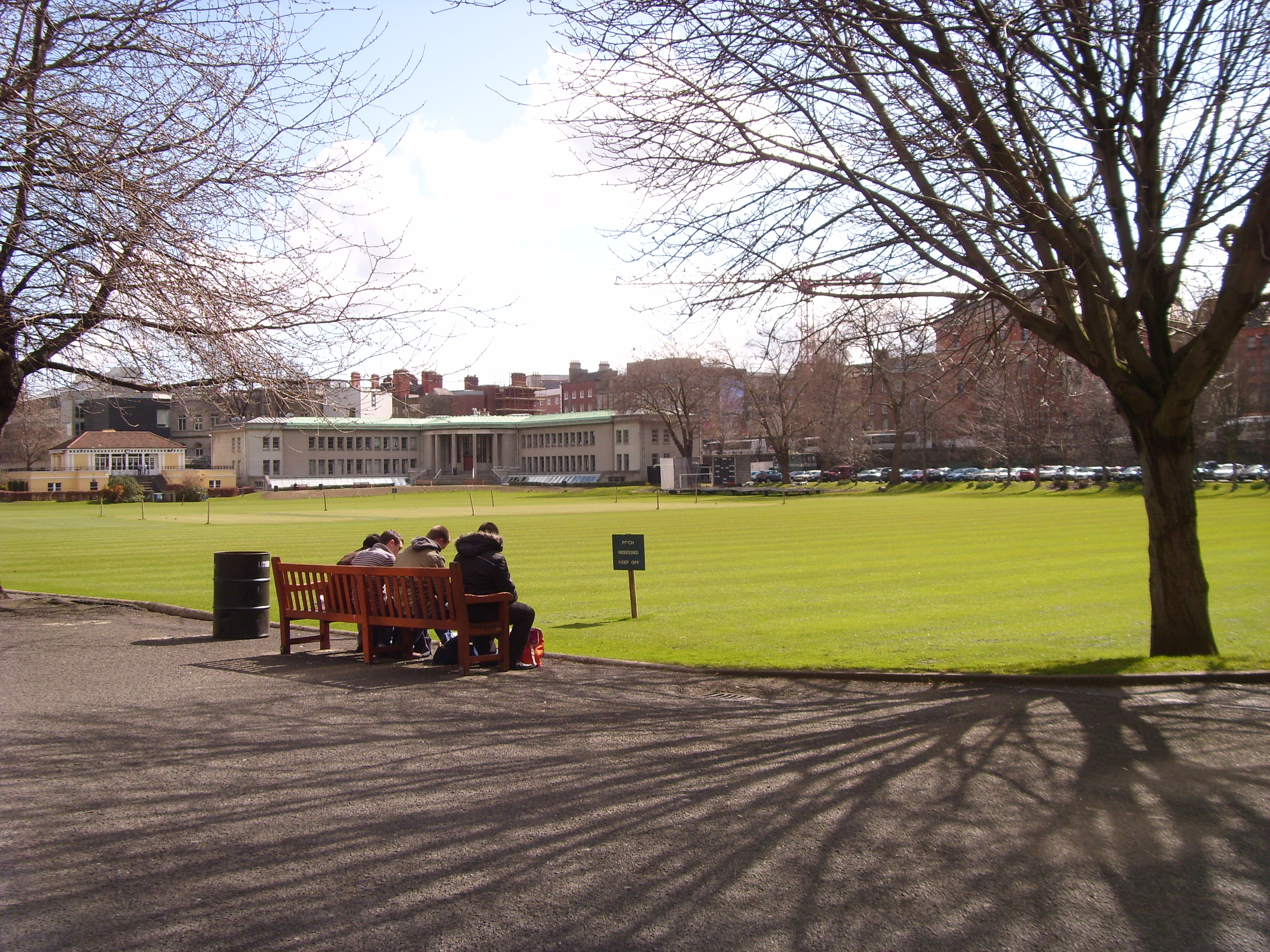
College Park, Dublin hosted Ireland women's first and to date only Women's Test match in 2000

This is a list of cricket grounds in Ireland, inclusive of all-Ireland.

Cricket was introduced to Ireland by the English in the towns of Kilkenny and Ballinasloe in the early 19th century. The game increased in popularity until the early 1880s. The Land War in the 1880s resulting from the Irish Land Commission and a ban on playing "foreign" games by the Gaelic Athletic Association set back the spread of cricket. Anyone playing foreign games such as cricket would be banned from the extremely popular Irish games such as hurling and Gaelic football, which in turn had a detrimental impact on the game. The ban was not lifted until 1970, after which time cricket has continued to grow in popularity.

== Men's international venues ==
- For a full list of grounds that have staged men's international matches, see List of international men's cricket grounds in Ireland

== Domestic teams ==
=== Leinster Lightning ===
- For a full list of grounds that Leinster Lightning have used as home grounds in first-class, List A or Twenty20 cricket, see List of Leinster Lightning grounds

=== Munster Reds ===
- For a full list of grounds that Munster Reds have used as home grounds in Twenty20 cricket, see List of Munster Reds grounds

=== Northern Knights ===
- For a full list of grounds that Northern Knights have used as home grounds in first-class, List A or Twenty20 cricket, see List of Northern Knights grounds

=== North West Warriors ===
- For a full list of grounds that North West Warriors have used as home grounds in first-class, List A or Twenty20 cricket, see List of North West Warriors grounds

== Other venues ==
=== First-class venues ===
Name	Location	First	Last	Matches	First	Last	Matches	Refs
Name	Location	First-class			List A			Refs
Beechgrove	Derry	only match: 27 July 1963; Ireland v Scotland		1	–	–	0	
College Park	Dublin	20 May 1895; Dublin University v Marylebone Cricket Club	12 August 1961; Ireland v Marylebone Cricket Club	28	–	–	0	
Lodge Road	Coleraine	18 July 1987; Ireland v Scotland	13 August 2012; Ireland v South Africa A	2	–	–	0	
Pollock Park	Lurgan	only match: 20 July 1999; Ireland v South Africa Academy		1	4 July 2005; Uganda v United States	7 July 2005; Uganda v United Arab Emirates	2	

=== List A venues ===
Name	Location	First	Last	Matches	Refs
Name	Location	List A			Refs
Ballygomartin Road	Belfast	only match: 1 July 2005; Canada v Namibia		1	
Drummond Cricket Club Ground	near Limavady	only match: 5 July 2005; Oman v Papua New Guinea		1	
John Hunter Grounds	Limavady	only match: 5 July 2005; Namibia v Scotland		1	
Moylena Ground	Antrim	1 July 2005; Denmark v Uganda	4 July 2005; Canada v Oman	2	
Newforge	Belfast	only match: 2 July 2005; Namibia v Papua New Guinea		1	
Osborne Park	Belfast	1 July 2005; Netherlands v Papua New Guinea	4 July 2005; Namibia v Netherlands	2	
The Inch	Dublin	9 July 2005; Denmark v Netherlands	11 July 2005; Oman v United States	2	
The Mall	Armagh	only match: 20 July 1999; Denmark v United States		1	
Upritchard Park	Bangor	2 July 2005; Canada v Scotland	29 June 2008; Ireland v Bangladesh A	4	
Wallace Park	Lisburn	only match: 2 July 2005; Bermuda v United Arab Emirates		1	

=== Defunct venues ===
Name	Location	First	Last	Matches	First	Last	Matches	Refs
Name	Location	First-class			List A			Refs
Cliftonville Cricket Club	Greenisland	–	–	0	only match: 4 July 2005; Bermuda v Denmark		1	
Ormeau Cricket Ground	Belfast	26 June 1926; Ireland v Wales	21 August 1999; Ireland v Scotland	9	25 June 1996; Ireland v Sussex	19 May 1999; Ireland v Essex Cricket Board	2	
Woodbrook Cricket Club Ground	Bray	2 May 1907; Ireland v Yorkshire	12 September 1912; CB Fry's XI v Australians	5	–	–	0	

== Women's international venues ==
Name	Location	First	Last	Matches	First	Last	Matches	First	Last	Matches	Refs
Name	Location	Women's Test			Women's ODI			Women's T20I			Refs
Anglesea Road Cricket Ground	Dublin	–	–	0	27 July 1998; Ireland Women v Australia Women	5 August 2016; Ireland Women v South Africa Women	5	only match: 27 July 2013; Ireland Women v Sri Lanka Women		1	
Ballymagorry	Strabane	–	–	0	only match: 28 July 2002; Ireland Women v India Women		1	–	–	0	
Bready Cricket Club Ground	Magheramason	–	–	0	–	–	0	5 September 2016; Ireland Women v Bangladesh Women	6 September 2016; Ireland Women v Bangladesh Women	2	
Carlisle Cricket Club Ground	Dublin	–	–	0	only match: 21 July 1996; Ireland Women v New Zealand Women		1	–	–	0	
Castle Avenue, Dublin	Dublin	–	–	0	16 August 1990; Ireland Women v England Women	30 June 2018; Bangladesh Women v Pakistan Women	5	28 August 2012; Ireland Women v Pakistan Women	29 August 2012; Ireland Women v Pakistan Women	3	(Note: Has hosted one neutral Women's T20I.)
Civil Service Cricket Club Ground	Belfast	–	–	0	only match: 5 August 1997; Ireland Women v South Africa Women		1	–	–	0	
Claremont Road Cricket Ground	Dublin	–	–	0	31 July 2005; Ireland Women v Australia Women	8 June 2018; Ireland Women v New Zealand Women	7	16 July 2014; Ireland Women v Pakistan Women	28 June 2018; Ireland Women v Bangladesh Women	10	
College Park	Dublin	only match: 30 July 2000; Ireland Women v Pakistan Women		1	1 July 1987; Ireland Women v Australia Women	22 July 2004; Ireland Women v New Zealand Women	11	–	–	0	
Kenure	Rush	–	–	0	23 July 2000; Ireland Women v Pakistan Women	24 July 2002; Ireland Women v India Women	3	only match: 28 June 2008; Ireland Women v West Indies Women		1	
Observatory Lane	Dublin	–	–	0	17 August 1990; Ireland Women v England Women	17 July 2013; Ireland Women v Pakistan Women	6	29 May 2009; Ireland Women v Pakistan Women	6 August 2009; Ireland Women v Netherlands Women	2	(Note: Has hosted one neutral Women's ODI.)
Ormeau Cricket Ground †	Belfast	–	–	0	only match: 28 June 1987; Ireland Women v Australia Women		1	–	–	0	
Park Avenue	Dublin	–	–	0	18 July 1995; Ireland Women v Denmark Women	12 August 2012; Bangladesh Women v Pakistan Women	5	–	–	0	(Note: Has hosted three neutral Women's ODIs.)
Shaw's Bridge Lower Ground	Belfast	–	–	0	19 September 2016; Ireland Women v Bangladesh Women	10 September 2016; Ireland Women v Bangladesh Women	2	–	–	0	
Sydney Parade	Dublin	–	–	0	19 July 1995; Ireland Women v Netherlands Women	27 July 2000; Ireland Women v Pakistan Women	4	only match: 1 July 2018; Ireland Women v Bangladesh Women		1	
The Village	Malahide	–	–	0	3 July 2002; Ireland Women v New Zealand Women	9 August 2016; Ireland Women v South Africa Women	3	28 May 2009; Ireland Women v Pakistan Women	29 June 2018; Ireland Women v Bangladesh Women	2	
The Vineyard	Skerries	–	–	0	30 July 2006; Ireland Women v India Women	10 June 2018; Ireland Women v New Zealand Women	4	only match: 25 May 2009; Ireland Women v Pakistan Women		1	
