= Andrew Sheridan (cricketer) =

Irish cricketer

Personal information
- Born: 19 November 1996 (age 29); Dublin
- Batting: Left-handed
- Bowling: Right-arm fast

Domestic team information
- Years: Team
- 2017–2018: Leinster Lightning
- T20 debut: 16 June 2017 Leinster Lightning v Munster Reds

Career statistics
Competition	Twenty20
Matches	2
Runs scored	17
Batting average	–
100s/50s	0/0
Top score	17*
Balls bowled	18
Wickets	1
Bowling average	26.00
5 wickets in innings	0
10 wickets in match	0
Best bowling	1/26
Catches/stumpings	0/–
- Source: ESPNcricinfo, 23 June 2017

Andrew Sheridan is an Irish cricketer. He made his Twenty20 cricket debut for Leinster Lightning in the 2017 Inter-Provincial Trophy on 16 June 2017.
