= Reuben Wilson (cricketer) =

Irish cricketer

Personal information
- Full name: Reuben Brian Wilson
- Born: 17 September 2006 (age 20); Dublin, Ireland
- Batting: Right-handed
- Bowling: Right-arm medium
- Role: Bowler

International information
- National side: Ireland (2026–present)
- Only Test (cap 36): 27 May 2026 v New Zealand

Domestic team information
- Years: Team
- 2023–2025: Leinster Lightning (squad no. 15)
- 2026: Northern Knights

Career statistics
Competition	Test	FC	LA	T20
Matches	1	2	16	17
Runs scored	4	31	56	8
Batting average	2.00	7.75	14.00	4.00
100s/50s	0/0	0/0	0/0	0/0
Top score	4	15	21	5*
Balls bowled	150	300	658	274
Wickets	1	4	29	14
Bowling average	89.00	37.25	20.89	33.92
5 wickets in innings	0	0	1	0
10 wickets in match	0	0	0	0
Best bowling	1/89	2/22	5/42	3/14
Catches/stumpings	1/–	2/–	6/–	5/–
- Source: Cricinfo, 1 August 2026

Reuben Brian Wilson (born 17 September 2006) is an Irish cricketer.

He has played for Leinster Lightning and Northern Knights in Irish inter-provincial cricket, as well as represented Ireland in Test cricket.

== Domestic career ==
Wilson began his young career at Phoenix Cricket Club in Dublin. At the age of 12 he was announced as the winner of Cricket Leinster's 2018 "Find A Fast Bowler" competition, an award previously won by Irish international Josh Little.

Having moved to YMCA in 2020 and given a good performance in the 2022 Under-19 Cricket World Cup, Wilson was called up to the Leinster Lightning squad for the first time in July 2022.

He made his professional debut aged 16 on 16 May 2023 in the opening List A game of the 2023 Inter-Provincial Cup against Northern Knights where he took 1/80 in a loss.

Just two days later he took a maiden five-for as he dismissed five of the Munster Reds top six batters to return with 5/42.

Wilson would only play another three games in the season before a back-injury ruled him out.

== International career ==
Wilson has been involved in Irish representative squads since a young age, being selected in the Irish Cubs U-13 program in 2018.

At the age of just 15 he was named in the Ireland U-19 squad for the 2022 Under-19 Cricket World Cup in the West Indies. He took 5 wickets in 4 matches as Ireland lost the Plate Final and finished 10th.

Wilson made his Test and international debut for Ireland at the age of 19 in the one-off Test match against New Zealand at Stormont in May 2026.
