= Jamie Holmes (cricketer) =

Irish cricketer (born 1992)

Personal information
- Full name: Jamie Paul Holmes
- Born: 13 October 1992 (age 34); Masterton, Wairarapa, New Zealand
- Batting: Right-handed
- Bowling: Right-arm leg break

Domestic team information
- Years: Team
- 2017: Northern Knights
- Only T20: 16 June 2017 Northern Knights v North West Warriors

Career statistics
Competition	Twenty20
Matches	1
Runs scored	1
Batting average	1.00
100s/50s	0/0
Top score	1
Catches/stumpings	2/–
- Source: Cricinfo, 24 June 2017

Jamie Paul Holmes (born 13 October 1992) is a New Zealand-born Irish cricketer. He made his Twenty20 cricket debut for Northern Knights in the 2017 Inter-Provincial Trophy on 16 June 2017.
