= Observatory Lane =

Cricket ground in Dublin, Ireland

Ground information
- Location: Dublin, Ireland
- Country: Ireland
- Coordinates: 53.3256°N 6.2620°W
- Establishment: 1865
- End names
- Rathmines; Mount Pleasant

International information
- First WODI: 17 August 1990: Ireland v England
- Last WODI: 17 July 2013: Ireland v Pakistan
- First WT20I: 29 May 2009: Ireland v Pakistan
- Last WT20I: 6 August 2009: Ireland v Netherlands

Team information
Leinster Lightning	(2017–2018)
- As of 3 September 2020; Source: Ground profile

Observatory Lane is a cricket ground in Rathmines, Dublin, Ireland.

== History ==
Leinster Cricket Club was founded in 1852, originally playing matches at nearby Grosvenor Square, before moving to Observatory Lane in 1865.

First-class cricket was first played at Observatory Lane in 1912 when Ireland played Scotland. The ground hosted six first-class matches before World War II, including a match between Ireland and the touring New Zealanders in 1937, in which no team passed 100 in any of the four innings. Ireland played the Marylebone Cricket Club in 1948, with a 27 year wait before the next first-class match was played at the ground in 1975. To date, 13 first-class matches have been played at Observatory Lane, the last in 2012 against Afghanistan in the ICC Intercontinental Cup. List A cricket was first played at Observatory Lane in the 2005 ICC Trophy, with the ground hosting two matches. A third List A match was played there between Leinster Lightning and Northern Knights in the 2017 Inter-Provincial Cup, with Leinster Lightning due to play a further List A match there in the 2018 Inter-Provincial Cup. Women's international cricket was first played at Observatory Lane in 1990, when Ireland women played England women in a Women's One Day International (WODI). To date six WODIs have been played at the ground, along with two Women's Twenty20 Internationals in 2009.

=== Rugby international ===
The Ireland rugby union team played their first home match at Observatory Lane in 1875 against England, after Lansdowne Road was deemed unsuitable.

Ireland International Rugby Union Matches
Date	Home	Score	Opponent	Competition	Attendance
13 December 1875	Ireland	0G–1G	England	1875–76 Home Nations	

== Records ==
=== First-class ===
- Highest team total: 462 by Ireland v Canada, 2011
- Lowest team total: 30 by Ireland v New Zealanders, 1937
- Highest individual innings: 144 by Andrew White for Ireland v Netherlands, 2010
- Best bowling in an innings: 8-80 by Robert Gregory for Ireland v Scotland, 1912
- Best bowling in a match: 10-45 by James Boucher for Ireland v Minor Counties, 1937

=== List A ===
- Highest team total: 239/8 by Leinster Lightning v Northern Knights, 2017
- Lowest team total: 132 by Northern Knights v Leinster Lightning, as above
- Highest individual innings: 126* by Kenneth Kamyuka for Uganda v Papua New Guinea, 2005
- Best bowling in an innings: 5-23 by Andrew Britton for North West Warriors v Leinster Lightning, 2018

== See also ==
- List of Leinster Lightning grounds
- List of cricket grounds in Ireland
