= Michael Gilmour =

Irish cricketer (born 1988)

Personal information
- Full name: Michael James Gilmour
- Born: 15 August 1988 (age 38); Belfast, Northern Ireland
- Batting: Right-handed
- Role: Wicket-keeper

Domestic team information
- Years: Team
- 2017: Northern Knights
- T20 debut: 26 May 2017 Northern Knights v Munster Reds

Career statistics
Competition	Twenty20
Matches	3
Runs scored	34
Batting average	11.33
100s/50s	0/0
Top score	18
Catches/stumpings	1/0
- Source: ESPNcricinfo, 16 June 2017

Michael James Gilmour (born 15 August 1988) is an Irish cricketer. He made his Twenty20 cricket debut for Northern Knights in the 2017 Inter-Provincial Trophy on 26 May 2017.
