= CJ van der Walt =

South African cricketer (born 1997)

Personal information
- Born: 12 February 1997 (age 29)
- Source: Cricinfo, 20 August 2020

CJ van der Walt (born 12 February 1997) is a South African cricketer. In 2020, he signed to play for the Northern Knights in Ireland. He made his Twenty20 debut for Northern Knights in the 2020 Inter-Provincial Trophy on 20 August 2020.
