= Oak Hill Cricket Club Ground =

Cricket ground in Kilbride, Ireland

Ground information
- Location: County Wicklow, Ireland
- Coordinates: 52.9286°N 6.1022°W
- Establishment: 2008
- End names
- Pavilion End; Church End

Team information
Leinster Lightning	(2017–2025)
- As of 15 April 2022; Source: Ground profile

Oak Hill Cricket Club Ground is a cricket ground in Kilbride, County Wicklow, Ireland.

== History ==
The ground was constructed in 2008 by businessman Peter Savill on his stud farm at Kilbride. The ground was officially opened on 22 June 2008, with an Ireland XI playing a Lashings XI. The pavilion at the ground is an exact replica of the one found at Ampleforth College in England, where Savill was educated. First-class cricket was first played at the ground in 2012, when Ireland played South Africa A. The ground was scheduled to host two Twenty20 matches as part of the tour, however both matches were cancelled due to rain. The future of the ground was called into question in 2013, when residents of a neighbouring property took legal action in the High Court after complaining about excess noise from the venue. The ground hosted a first-class match between Leinster Lightning and North West Warriors in 2017 Inter-Provincial Championship, which was the inaugural domestic first-class match to be played in Leinster.

== Records ==
=== First-class ===
- Highest team total: 365 by Leinster Lightning v North West Warriors, 2017
- Lowest team total: 202 by Ireland v South Africa A, 2012
- Highest individual innings: 156 by Ed Joyce for Leinster Lightning v North West Warriors, 2017
- Best bowling in an innings: 7-56 by Wayne Parnell for South Africa A v Ireland, 2012
- Best bowling in a match: 8-120 by George Dockrell for Leinster Lightning v North West Warriors, 2017

== See also ==
- List of Leinster Lightning grounds
- List of cricket grounds in Ireland
