= Aaron Heywood =

Irish cricketer

Personal information
- Full name: Aaron Richard Heywood
- Born: 20 November 1997 (age 28); Derry
- Batting: Right-handed
- Bowling: Right-arm off-break

Domestic team information
- Years: Team
- 2017: North West Warriors
- Only T20: 11 August 2017 North West v Northern Knights

Career statistics
Competition	Twenty20
Matches	1
Runs scored	–
Batting average	–
100s/50s	–
Top score	–
Balls bowled	12
Wickets	0
Bowling average	–
5 wickets in innings	–
10 wickets in match	–
Best bowling	–
Catches/stumpings	0/–
- Source: Cricinfo, 11 August 2017

Aaron Richard Heywood is an Irish cricketer. He made his Twenty20 debut for North West Warriors in the 2017 Inter-Provincial Trophy on 11 August 2017.
