= Joe Carroll (cricketer) =

Australian cricketer (born 1991)

Personal information
- Full name: Joe Carroll
- Born: 21 June 1991 (age 35); Hobart, Tasmania
- Batting: Right-handed
- Bowling: Right-arm medium

Domestic team information
- Years: Team
- 2018–2023: Leinster Lightning
- T20 debut: 18 May 2018 Leinster v Munster

Career statistics
Competition	Twenty20
Matches	4
Runs scored	3
Batting average	3.00
100s/50s	0/0
Top score	3
Balls bowled	54
Wickets	4
Bowling average	21.00
5 wickets in innings	0
10 wickets in match	0
Best bowling	2/10
Catches/stumpings	1/–
- Source: Cricinfo, 7 August 2025

Joe Carroll (born 21 June 1991) is an Australian cricketer. He made his Twenty20 debut for Leinster Lightning in the 2018 Inter-Provincial Trophy on 18 May 2018.
