= Diarmuid Carey =

Irish cricketer (born 2000)

Personal information
- Full name: Diarmuid Carey
- Born: 28 September 2000 (age 26); Cork, Munster, Ireland
- Batting: Left-handed
- Bowling: Slow left-arm orthodox

Domestic team information
- Years: Team
- 2018–2020: Munster Reds

Career statistics
Competition	Twenty20
Matches	3
Runs scored	2
Batting average	–
100s/50s	–/–
Top score	2*
Balls bowled	24
Wickets	1
Bowling average	78.00
5 wickets in innings	–
10 wickets in match	–
Best bowling	1/31
Catches/stumpings	1/–
- Source: Cricinfo, 23 January 2021

Diarmuid Carey (born 28 September 2000) is an Irish cricketer. He made his Twenty20 debut for Munster Reds in the 2018 Inter-Provincial Trophy on 25 May 2018 against North West Warriors. He did not feature for Munster in the 2019 season, but did go onto play a further two Twenty20 matches against Leinster Lightning in the 2020 Inter-Provincial Trophy.
