= Tom Anders =

Irish cricketer

Personal information
- Full name: Tom Anders
- Source: Cricinfo, 19 May 2018

Tom Anders is an Irish cricketer. He made his Twenty20 debut for Munster Reds in the 2018 Inter-Provincial Trophy on 18 May 2018.
