= Upritchard Park =

Cricket ground in Northern Ireland

Coordinates: 54°38′36.78″N 5°39′19.34″W

- Location: Bangor, Northern Ireland
- Capacity: 2,000
- End names
- Bloomfield End; Gransha End
- As of 29 August 2011; Source: Ground profile

Upritchard Park is a cricket ground in Bangor, Northern Ireland and the home of Bangor Cricket Club. In 2005, the ground hosted three List A matches in the 2005 ICC Trophy. The first of these was between Canada and Scotland, which resulted in a Scottish victory by 7 wickets. The second saw Denmark play the UAE, with the match ending in a no result, while the third saw Ireland play Denmark, with Ireland winning by 73 runs.

In 2008, the ground hosted a further List A match between Ireland and Bangladesh A, which resulted in an Irish victory by 5 wickets.
