= Senan Jones =

Irish cricketer (born 2000)

Personal information
- Born: 16 October 2000 (age 26)
- Source: Cricinfo, 6 July 2018

Senan Jones (born 16 October 2000) is an Irish cricketer. He made his Twenty20 debut for Munster Reds in the 2018 Inter-Provincial Trophy on 6 July 2018.
