= Jarred Barnes =

Irish cricketer (born 1988)

Personal information
- Full name: Jarred Barnes
- Born: 9 February 1988 (age 38); Durban, South Africa
- Batting: Right-handed
- Bowling: Right-arm medium

Domestic team information
- Years: Team
- 2018–present: Leinster Lightning
- 2018–present: Munster Reds
- First-class debut: 29 May 2018 Leinster v Northern
- Twenty20 debut: 6 July 2018; Munster v North West

Career statistics
Competition	FC	T20
Matches	2	3
Runs scored	14	9
Batting average	–	9.00
100s/50s	0/0	0/0
Top score	13*	9
Balls bowled	245	72
Wickets	4	2
Bowling average	24.25	60.00
5 wickets in innings	0	0
10 wickets in match	0	n/a
Best bowling	3/46	2/46
Catches/stumpings	0/–	1/–
- Source: Cricinfo, 28 August 2018

Jarred Barnes (born 9 February 1988) is an Irish cricketer. He made his first-class debut for Leinster Lightning in the 2018 Inter-Provincial Championship on 29 May 2018. He made his Twenty20 debut for Munster Reds in the 2018 Inter-Provincial Trophy on 6 July 2018.
