= Alexander Haggan =

Irish cricketer (born 1992)

Personal information
- Full name: Robert Alexander Haggan
- Born: 23 December 1992 (age 33); Belfast, Northern Ireland
- Batting: Right-handed
- Bowling: Right-arm fast-medium

Domestic team information
- Years: Team
- 2017: Northern Knights
- Only T20: 11 August 2017 Northern v North West

Career statistics
Competition	Twenty20
Matches	1
Runs scored	–
Batting average	–
100s/50s	–
Top score	–
Balls bowled	12
Wickets	1
Bowling average	16.00
5 wickets in innings	0
10 wickets in match	0
Best bowling	1/16
Catches/stumpings	0/–
- Source: Cricinfo, 11 August 2017

Robert Alexander Haggan (born 23 December 1992) is an Irish cricketer. He made his Twenty20 debut for Northern Knights in the 2017 Inter-Provincial Trophy on 11 August 2017.
