= Adam Berry (cricketer) =

Irish cricketer (born 1992)

Personal information
- Full name: Adam Richard M Berry
- Born: 22 September 1992 (age 34); Lisburn, Northern Ireland
- Batting: Right-handed
- Bowling: Right-arm medium
- Role: Batsman

Domestic team information
- Years: Team
- 2017: Northern Knights
- Only T20: 11 August 2017 Northern Knights v North West Warriors

Career statistics
Competition	Twenty20
Matches	1
Runs scored	1
Batting average	24.00
100s/50s	0/0
Top score	24
Catches/stumpings	0/–
- Source: Cricinfo, 16 August 2017

Adam Richard M Berry (born 22 September 1992) is an Irish cricketer. He made his Twenty20 debut for Northern Knights in the 2017 Inter-Provincial Trophy on 11 August 2017.
