= Robert De Forest =

Robert De Forest may refer to:

- Robert E. De Forest (1845–1924), American politician
- Robert W. DeForest (1848–1931), American lawyer, financier, and philanthropist
