= Pollock Park =

Cricket ground in Northern Ireland

Coordinates: 54°26′54.53″N 6°20′03.31″W

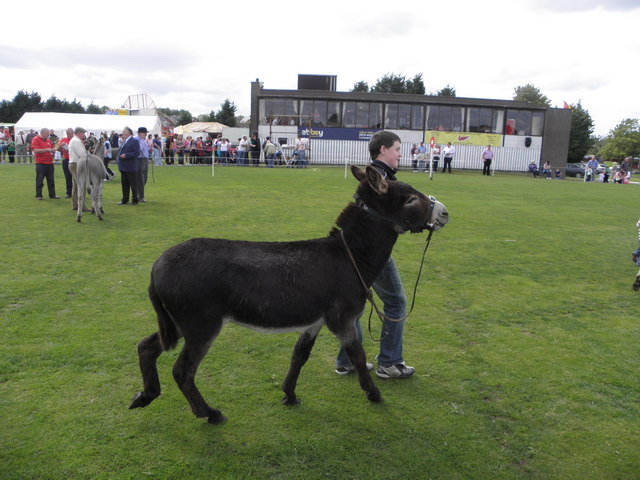
- The pavilion in the background
- Location: Lurgan, Northern Ireland
- As of 28 August 2011; Source: Ground profile

Pollock Park is a cricket ground in Lurgan, Northern Ireland. In 1999, the ground hosted a first-class match between Ireland and the touring South Africa Academy team, with the match ending in a draw. In 2005, the ground hosted two List A matches in the 2005 ICC Trophy. The first of these was between Uganda and the United States, which resulted in a Ugandan victory by 6 wickets, The second saw Uganda play the UAE, which resulted in a 63 run victory for the UAE.
