= Oliver Gunning =

Irish cricketer (born 1996)

Personal information
- Born: 3 October 1996 (age 30)
- Source: Cricinfo, 6 July 2018

Oliver Gunning (born 3 October 1996) is an Irish cricketer. He made his Twenty20 debut for Munster Reds in the 2018 Inter-Provincial Trophy on 6 July 2018.
