= Yaqoob Ali =

Pakistani-born Irish cricketer (born 1980)

Personal information
- Born: 5 April 1980 (age 46); Karachi, Pakistan
- Batting: Right-handed
- Bowling: Right-arm leg-break
- Role: Bowler

Domestic team information
- Years: Team
- 2014–2016: Leinster Lightning
- 2017–2019: Munster Reds
- T20 debut: 26 May 2017 Munster Reds v Northern Knights

Career statistics
Competition	Twenty20
Matches	13
Runs scored	17
Batting average	8.50
100s/50s	0/0
Top score	9*
Balls bowled	264
Wickets	17
Bowling average	20.17
5 wickets in innings	0
10 wickets in match	0
Best bowling	4/29
Catches/stumpings	7/–
- Source: ESPNcricinfo, 7 October 2021

Yaqoob Ali (born 5 April 1980) is a Pakistani-born Irish cricketer. He made his Twenty20 cricket debut for Munster Reds in the 2017 Inter-Provincial Trophy on 26 May 2017. He was the leading wicket-taker in the 2018 Inter-Provincial Trophy tournament, with twelve dismissals in six matches.
