= Jack Carty (cricketer) =

Irish cricketer

Personal information
- Full name: Jack Carty
- Batting: Left-handed
- Bowling: Right-arm medium-fast
- Role: Bowling all-rounder

Domestic team information
- Years: Team
- 2018–2021: Munster Reds
- 2022: Leinster Lightning

Career statistics
Competition	LA	T20
Matches	7	12
Runs scored	152	104
Batting average	38.00	13.00
100s/50s	0/1	0/0
Top score	97	33
Balls bowled	114	84
Wickets	1	4
Bowling average	105.00	29.50
5 wickets in innings	0	0
10 wickets in match	0	0
Best bowling	1/45	2/13
Catches/stumpings	5/–	3/–
- Source: Cricinfo, 5 June 2022

Jack Carty is an Irish cricketer. He made his Twenty20 debut for Munster Reds in the 2018 Inter-Provincial Trophy on 18 May 2018. He made his List A debut on 22 May 2021, for Munster Reds in the 2021 Inter-Provincial Cup.
