= Waringstown =

Village in County Down, Northern Ireland

Coordinates: 54.4336°N 6.2990°W

Waringstown: Irish: Baile an Bhairínigh
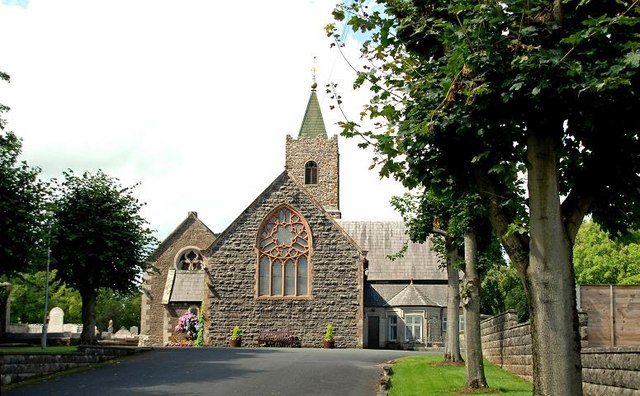
- Donaghacloney parish church, Waringstown

- Location within County Down
- Population: 3,787
- Irish grid reference: J103552
  - Belfast: 23 miles (37 km)
- District: Armagh City, Banbridge and Craigavon
- County: County Down
- Country: Northern Ireland
- Sovereign state: United Kingdom
- Post town: CRAIGAVON
- Postcode district: BT66
- Dialling code: 028
- UK Parliament: Upper Bann
- NI Assembly: Upper Bann

Waringstown (Irish: Baile an Bhairínigh) is a large village in County Down, Northern Ireland. It lies southeast of Lurgan and north of Banbridge, within the parish of Donaghcloney, and the barony of Iveagh Lower, Lower Half. In the 2021 census it had a population of 3,787 people. Over the years, the village has been bestowed numerous awards, including "Best Kept Small Town" for its floral displays and pleasant appearance.

== History ==
The area of Waringstown was formerly part of the district of Clanconnell, which was within the Gaelic territory of Iveagh. After the Irish Confederate Wars, in which the sons of Glasney McAgholy Magennis of Clanconnell took part, their lands were confiscated by the English and shared among the Cromwellian soldiers in lieu of pay. By 1659, the area had been sold to Englishman William Waring, who built a fortified house on the site of an old fort. The weaving village of Waringstown developed under the auspices of William Waring and his descendants. Waring's son, Samuel, brought Flemish weavers to the village, building Huguenot style cottages for them, some of which survive today. In the past, the village was renowned for its handloom damask weaving. The industrial focus was at the southern end of the town, where brewing, linen-weaving, and cambric and clothing manufacture were formerly carried out and where some substantial 18th century and 19th century industrial buildings still exist.

On 20 December 1990—during the Troubles—Wilfred Wethers (46), a Protestant off duty Royal Ulster Constabulary (RUC) officer, was shot and killed by an Irish Republican Army (IRA) sniper while driving his car in Waringstown.

== Cricket ==
The village has, over the years, been associated with the sport of cricket, something that has been attributed to the area's planters being predominantly from the North of England. The local team, Waringstown Cricket Club, has achieved some success in the NCU Senior League, playing its home matches at The Lawn. The club was established in 1851, by a member of the Waring family, and its ground was also donated by the family. The popularity of the sport in the village and its influence elsewhere has led to it being dubbed "The Home of Cricket in Ulster". The neighbouring village of Donaghcloney has a similar heritage in the sport.

== Education ==
- Waringstown Primary School

Waringstowns teachers of 2026 consit of:

Mrs Brown (P.1),Mrs Park (P.1),Mrs Boyce (P.2), Mrs Munce (P.2),Mrs McElhinney (P.3), Miss Mahaffy (P.4), Mr Gault (VP and P.4), Mrs Carpenter (P.4), Mrs Williamson (P.5), Mrs Peacocke (P.5), Mrs Anderson (P.6), Mr Mitchell (P.6), Mrs Davison (P.7), Mrs Humphreys (P.7), Mr McCambley (Principle)

Other teaching staff include:

Mrs McConville (Literacy support), and Mrs Chestnutt (Numeracy support).

== Demography ==
At the 2011 census Waringstown had a population of 3,683 people, an increase of 45.6% on the Census 2001 figure of 2,529. Of these:

- 22.4% were aged under 16 years and 11.51% were aged 65 and over
- 49.69% of the population were male and 50.31% were female
- 84.14% were from a Protestant or other Christian background and 8.85% were from a Catholic background
- 2.79% of people aged 16–74 were unemployed
