= Ruadhan Jones =

Irish cricketer (born 1996)

Personal information
- Full name: Ruadhan Tom Jones
- Born: 9 February 1996 (age 30)
- Source: Cricinfo, 6 July 2018

Ruadhan Jones (born 9 February 1996) is an Irish cricketer. He made his Twenty20 debut for Munster Reds in the 2018 Inter-Provincial Trophy on 6 July 2018. In 2015 Ruadhán joined YMCA CC from Terenure CC.

Jones completed a degree in media at University College Cork and is studying for a master's degree in journalism at Technological University of Dublin. He has contributed articles to a number of publications such as The Irish Catholic. Jones from Grenagh, County Cork, attended Scoil Mhuire, Gan Smál, Blarney.
