= Craig Lewis (cricketer) =

Irish cricketer (born 1986)

Personal information
- Born: 28 October 1986 (age 40); Belfast
- Batting: Right-handed
- Bowling: Right-arm fast-medium

Domestic team information
- Years: Team
- 2017: Northern Knights
- T20 debut: 26 May 2017 Northern Knights v Munster Reds

Career statistics
Competition	Twenty20
Matches	2
Runs scored	1
Batting average	0.50
100s/50s	0/0
Top score	1
Balls bowled	12
Wickets	0
Bowling average	–
5 wickets in innings	–
10 wickets in match	–
Best bowling	–
Catches/stumpings	2/–
- Source: Cricinfo, 17 September 2021

Craig Lewis (born 28 October 1986) is an Irish cricketer. He made his Twenty20 cricket debut for Northern Knights in the 2017 Inter-Provincial Trophy on 26 May 2017.
