= Gary King (cricketer) =

Zimbabwean cricketer (born 1996)

Personal information
- Born: 26 May 1996 (age 30)
- Batting: Right-handed
- Bowling: Right-arm medium-fast
- Role: Bowler

Domestic team information
- Years: Team
- 2017: Munster Reds
- T20 debut: 26 May 2017 Munster Reds v Northern Knights

Career statistics
Competition	Twenty20
Matches	2
Runs scored	12
Batting average	12.00
100s/50s	0/0
Top score	12
Balls bowled	28
Wickets	2
Bowling average	22.00
5 wickets in innings	0
10 wickets in match	0
Best bowling	2/23
Catches/stumpings	0/–
- Source: ESPNcricinfo, 16 August 2017

Gary King (born 26 May 1996) is a Zimbabwean cricketer. He made his Twenty20 cricket debut for Munster Reds in the 2017 Inter-Provincial Trophy in Ireland on 26 May 2017.
