= Morne Bauer =

Irish cricketer

Personal information
- Born: 8 October 1993 (age 33); East London, South Africa
- Batting: Right-handed
- Bowling: Right-arm medium-fast

Domestic team information
- Years: Team
- 2017–2018: Munster Reds
- T20 debut: 16 June 2017 Munster Reds v Leinster Lightning

Career statistics
| Competition | Twenty20 |
|---|---|
| Matches | 4 |
| Runs scored | 26 |
| Batting average | 6.50 |
| 100s/50s | 0/0 |
| Top score | 14 |
| Balls bowled | 54 |
| Wickets | 0 |
| Bowling average | – |
| 5 wickets in innings | – |
| 10 wickets in match | – |
| Best bowling | – |
| Catches/stumpings | 0/– |
- Source: Cricinfo, 12 June 2018

Morne Bauer is an Irish cricketer. He made his Twenty20 cricket debut for Munster Reds in the 2017 Inter-Provincial Trophy on 16 June 2017.
