= Jeremy Benton =

New Zealand cricketer (born 1995)

Personal information
- Full name: Jeremy Thomas Andrew Benton
- Born: 14 June 1995 (age 31); Canterbury, New Zealand
- Batting: Right-handed
- Bowling: Slow left-arm orthodox

Domestic team information
- Years: Team
- 2016/17–2018/19: Canterbury
- 2018–2019: Munster Reds
- LA debut: 3 December 2017 Canterbury v Otago
- T20 debut: 4 December 2016 Canterbury v Central Districts

Career statistics
| Competition | List A | T20 |
|---|---|---|
| Matches | 3 | 22 |
| Runs scored | 44 | 66 |
| Batting average | 44.00 | 9.42 |
| 100s/50s | 0/0 | 0/0 |
| Top score | 40* | 21 |
| Balls bowled | 135 | 427 |
| Wickets | 1 | 20 |
| Bowling average | 127.00 | 27.30 |
| 5 wickets in innings | 0 | 0 |
| 10 wickets in match | 0 | 0 |
| Best bowling | 1/45 | 3/18 |
| Catches/stumpings | 0/– | 6/– |
- Source: ESPNcricinfo, 8 May 2022

Jeremy Thomas Andrew Benton (born 14 June 1995) is a New Zealand former cricketer. He made his Twenty20 debut for Canterbury on 4 December 2016 in the 2016–17 Super Smash. Prior to his debut, he was part of New Zealand's squad for the 2014 Under-19 Cricket World Cup. He made his List A debut for Canterbury in the 2017–18 Ford Trophy on 3 December 2017.

He played cricket in Ireland in 2018 and 2019, captaining the Munster Reds team.
