= Stephanus Grobler =

South African cricketer (born 1982)

Personal information
- Full name: Stephanus Frederick Grobler
- Born: 11 November 1982 (age 44); Pretoria, South Africa
- Batting: Right-handed
- Bowling: Right-arm off break

Domestic team information
- Years: Team
- 2005/06: Gauteng
- 2006/07–2008/09: Boland
- 2009/10–2010/11: South Western Districts
- 2017: Munster Reds
- FC debut: 16 February 2006 Gauteng v Northerns
- Last FC: 17 March 2011 SW Districts v Northerns
- LA debut: 14 October 2007 Boland v KwaZulu-Natal Inland
- Last LA: 20 March 2011 SW Districts v Northerns

Career statistics
Competition	FC	LA	T20
Matches	30	19	5
Runs scored	729	123	119
Batting average	18.22	11.18	29.75
100s/50s	1/0	0/0	0/0
Top score	106	27	43*
Balls bowled	3,959	575	60
Wickets	71	16	3
Bowling average	32.61	29.68	29.00
5 wickets in innings	3	0	0
10 wickets in match	0	0	0
Best bowling	5/38	4/44	3/12
Catches/stumpings	10/–	6/–	0/–
- Source: CricketArchive, 16 August 2017

Stephanus Frederick Grobler (born 11 November 1982) is a South African former cricketer who played for Gauteng, Boland and South Western Districts. A right-handed batsman and right-arm off break bowler, he played 30 first-class matches between 2006 and 2011.

Grobler also played club cricket in the Leicestershire Premier League with Thorpe Arnold and Narborough & Littlethorpe.

He made his Twenty20 cricket debut for Munster Reds in the 2017 Inter-Provincial Trophy on 26 May 2017.
