= The Inch, Dublin =

Cricket grounds in North County Dublin

Coordinates: 53°35′17.54″N 6°11′42.70″W

The Inch
Ground information
- Location: Balrothery, Fingal, County Dublin
- Establishment: 2001 (first recorded match)

Team information
| North County Cricket Club |
- As of 29 August 2011; Source: Ground profile

The Inch is a cricket ground in Balrothery, County Dublin, Ireland. The first recorded match on the ground was in 2001, when North County played The Hills. In 2005, the ground hosted two List A matches in the 2005 ICC Trophy. The first of these saw Denmark play the Netherlands, which resulted in a victory by six wickets for the Netherlands. The second of these saw Oman play the United States, which resulted three wicket victory for Oman.

In 2011, it was one of the venues for the 2011 ICC Under-19 Cricket World Cup Qualifier.
