= Jareth McCready =

Cricket umpire

Personal information
- Born: 6 July 1971 (age 55); Downpatrick, Northern Ireland
- Role: Umpire

Umpiring information
- T20Is umpired: 3 (2022–2022)
- WODIs umpired: 9 (2018–2024)
- WT20Is umpired: 10 (2021–2023)
- Source: Cricinfo, 17 August 2022

Jareth McCready (born 6 July 1971) is a Northern Irish cricket umpire. In February 2022, he was elevated to Cricket Ireland's International Umpire Panel, replacing Alan Neill. His men's international umpiring debut, on 28 June 2022, came in a Twenty20 International (T20I) between Ireland and India.

== See also ==
- List of Twenty20 International cricket umpires
