= List of international men's cricket grounds in Ireland =

Locations of international grounds in Ireland

International men's cricket was first played in Ireland in 1855 by a Gentlemen of England team, although it would not be until 1888 that the first tour by a team termed as representative was made by Scotland.

The first Test match to be played in Ireland came 120 years later in 2018 between Ireland and Pakistan at Malahide.

The first One Day International to be held in Ireland came in the 1999 Cricket World Cup between Bangladesh and the West Indies at Castle Avenue, Dublin.

In 2008, the Stormont in Belfast hosted the first Twenty20 International to be played in Ireland during the 2008 ICC World Twenty20 Qualifier, with Canada playing the Netherlands.

== Men's international grounds ==
=== Active venues ===
Below is a complete list of grounds used for men's international cricket in Ireland. (Note: Count includes only those matches which have been completed.)

Name	Location	First	Last	No.	First	Last	No.	First	Last	No.	Refs
Name	Location	Test			One Day International			Twenty20 International			Refs
Test Grounds
The Village	Malahide	11 May 2018; Ireland v Pakistan	–	1	3 Sep 2013; Ireland v England	15 Jul 2022; Ireland v New Zealand	22	15 Jul 2015; Ireland v Hong Kong	23 Aug; Ireland v India	18	(Note: Hosted the first Test match in Ireland in 2018.)
ODI & T20I grounds
Castle Avenue	Clontarf	–	–	0	21 May 1999; Bangladesh v West Indies	15 May 2019 Ireland v Bangladesh	25	25 Jul 2015; Afghanistan v Oman	29 Aug 2021 Ireland v Zimbabwe	3	(Note: Hosted the first One Day International match in Ireland in 1999.)
Stormont	Belfast	25 July 2024; Ireland v Zimbabwe	–	1	13 Jun 2006; Ireland v England	13 Sep 2021 Ireland v Zimbabwe	34	2 Aug 2008; Canada v Netherlands	17 Aug 2022 Ireland v Afghanistan	27	(Note: Hosted the first Twenty20 International match in Ireland in 2008.)
Bready	Magheramason	–	–	0	1 Jul 2019 Ireland v Zimbabwe	–	1	18 Jun 2015 Ireland v Scotland	4 Sep 2021; Ireland v Zimbabwe	12	

== See also ==
- List of cricket grounds in Ireland
