= Carson McCullough =

Irish cricketer (born 2005)

Personal information
- Full name: Carson John Brian McCullough
- Born: 28 February 2005 (age 21); Belfast, Northern Ireland
- Batting: Right-handed
- Bowling: Slow left-arm orthodox

Domestic team information
- Years: Team
- 2023–2024: Munster Reds
- 2023: North West Warriors
- 2025–2026: Northern Knights

Career statistics
Competition	List A	Twenty20
Matches	7	12
Runs scored	100	45
Batting average	16.66	6.42
100s/50s	0/0	0/0
Top score	28*	14
Balls bowled	150	216
Wickets	2	14
Bowling average	82.00	21.28
5 wickets in innings	0	0
10 wickets in match	0	0
Best bowling	1/35	4/25
Catches/stumpings	3/–	3/–
- Source: Cricinfo, 3 August 2026

Carson John Brian McCullough (born 28 February 2005) is an Irish cricketer. McCullough is from Belfast and plays his club cricket for CIYMS. He has represented Ireland at U-19 level and was selected to be part of the squad for the 2024 Under-19 Cricket World Cup.

== Domestic career ==
Playing in the Northern Cricket Union with CIYMS, McCullough has represented provincial teams at various age groups throughout his career.

He was named in the Northern Knights Under-15 team in 2019 and had graduated to Under-17 level by 2021.

He began training with the Emerging Knights in 2021 and played two games in the Future Series for them, the level just below senior domestic cricket. In 2022 an Ireland U-17 team was added to the competition, for which McCullough played.

The left-arm spinner was back in the Emerging Knights team for the 2023 Future Series but it would not be long before his services were required elsewhere.

On 13 July 2023 McCullough was named in the Munster Reds squad for their upcoming T20 fixtures in Bready having been loaned out by the NCU. Coach and former Ireland international Jeremy Bray said that he had "no doubt this level won’t phase him".

McCullough made his T20 debut for the Reds against the North West Warriors on 14 July in a rained out match. He made 5 runs in what would be his only Reds appearance.

In September he would be loaned out again, this time to the Warriors, for who he would make his List A debut against his former teammates in the Reds. He took his first senior wicket by bowling Irish Test all-rounder Tyrone Kane but went for 64 runs from his 8 overs.

== International career ==
McCullough was named in the Ireland U-17 team for the 2022 Celtic Cup series against Scotland U-17s where he would take 7 wickets across 4 matches.

He would be promoted to the U-19 squad in 2023 for their tour of Great Britain. He made his Youth ODI debut against England U-19s during a famous win for Ireland on 21 August 2023, taking 2 wickets and hammering 23*(10).

The youngster was named in Ireland's 2024 U-19 World Cup squad to compete in South Africa.
