= Robert Forrest (cricketer) =

Irish cricketer (born 1993)

Personal information
- Full name: Robert James Forrest
- Born: 25 May 1993 (age 33); Dublin
- Batting: Right-handed
- Role: Batsman, wicket-keeper

Domestic team information
- Years: Team
- 2017–2018: Munster Reds
- T20 debut: 26 May 2017 Munster Reds v Northern Knights

Career statistics
Competition	Twenty20
Matches	10
Runs scored	229
Batting average	22.90
100s/50s	0/1
Top score	59
Catches/stumpings	3/0
- Source: Cricinfo, 31 May 2018

Robert James Forrest (born 25 May 1993) is an Irish cricketer. He made his Twenty20 cricket debut for Munster Reds in the 2017 Inter-Provincial Trophy on 26 May 2017.
