= Shaw's Bridge Lower Ground =

Cricket ground

- Interactive map of Shaw's Bridge Lower Ground

Ground information
- Location: Belfast, Northern Ireland
- Country: Ireland
- Tenants: Ireland women's cricket team

International information
- First WODI: 9 September 2016: Ireland v Bangladesh
- Last WODI: 10 September 2016: Ireland v Bangladesh

Team information
| Instonians | (2004–present) |
- As of 3 September 2020; Source: CricketArchive Cricket Ireland

Shaw's Bridge Lower Ground is a cricket ground in Belfast, Northern Ireland. It hosted two matches in the 2005 ICC Trophy tournament. One of the matches saw Paul Hoffmann take 6 wickets for 12 runs playing for Scotland against Oman, a record for Scotland in ICC Trophy competition.

It is the home of Cooke Collegians Cricket Club and Instonians Cricket Club.

In September 2016, the Ireland women's cricket team hosted two ODI matches at the ground against Bangladesh.
