= Richard Beamish Cricket Grounds =

Cricket ground in Mardyke, Cork, Ireland

- Mardyke; Cricket Club
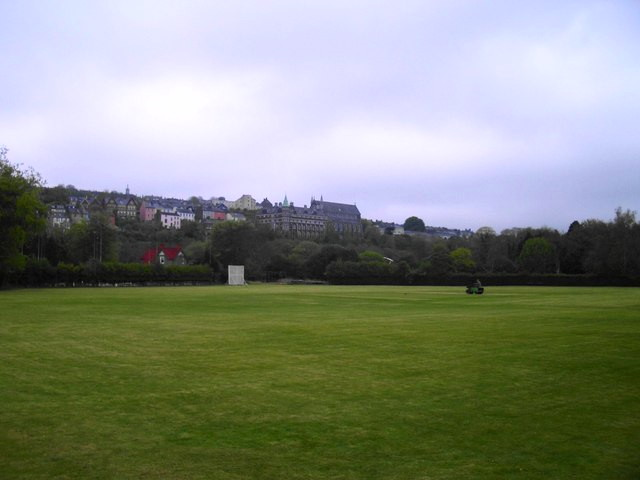

Ground information
- Location: Cork, Ireland
- Coordinates: 51.8964°N 8.4919°W
- Establishment: 1850
- End names
- Dyke Walk End; River End

Team information
Cork County Cricket Club	(1874–present)
Munster Reds	(2017–present)
- As of 2 December 2018; Source: CricketArchive

Richard Beamish Cricket Grounds are a cricket ground in the Mardyke, Cork, Ireland. The cricket field and facilities are located on the southern bank of the River Lee, and overlooked by University College Cork and St Vincent's Catholic Church. The ground is officially named after Richard Beamish, but it is generally called The Mardyke after the area where it is situated, or the Cricket Club as it is the home ground of Cork County Cricket Club. The Munster representative provincial side, the Munster Reds, also use The Mardyke as their home ground.

== History ==
Cricket was first played at the Mardyke in 1850. Cork County Cricket Club was formed in 1874, and began playing their home grounds at the Mardyke. It was around the 1890s that a lot of the features of the ground were established, under the stewardship of Sir George Colthurst. Some of the improvements made to the ground around this time were also funded by the nearby Queen's College. Facilities were of a sufficient standard to attract teams from England, including W. G. Grace's London County, who played Ireland at the ground in 1903. The current long room was built for the 1902 International Exhibition.

The onset of the First World War led to an end of touring teams playing at Cork, however cricket was played by army and naval forces based in and around Cork. With Irish independence in 1922, the military departed and cricket was more dependent on local civilian players. By the 1950s, the number of touring teams visiting the Mardyke had increased, and the ground hosted its inaugural first-class cricket match in 1947, when Ireland played Scotland. The Mardyke played host to two more first-class matches between the sides in 1961 and 1973.

In 2006, the future of the ground was secured for another 150 years, following a legal dispute over ownership between Cork County Cricket Club and the Beamish and Crawford brewing company. In 2017, Twenty20 cricket was first played at the Mardyke, when Munster Reds played the Northern Knights in the 2017 Inter-Provincial Trophy. List A one-day cricket was first played at The Mardyke in the 2021 Inter-Provincial Cup, when Munster Reds hosted the North West Warriors.

== Records ==
=== First-class ===
- Highest team total: 235 all out by Ireland v Scotland, 1961
- Lowest team total: 103 all out by Ireland v Scotland, 1947
- Highest individual innings: 125 by Stanley Bergin for Ireland v Scotland, 1961
- Best bowling in an innings: 7-38 by Dermott Monteith for Ireland v Scotland, 1973
- Best bowling in a match: 12-97 by Dermott Monteith, as above

=== List A ===
- Highest team total: 292 for 6 by North West Warriors v Munster Reds, 2021
- Lowest team total: 289 for 6 by Munster Reds v North West Warriors, as above
- Highest individual innings: 110 by William Porterfield for North West Warriors v Munster Reds, as above
- Best bowling in an innings: 3 for 48 by Craig Young for North West Warriors v Munster Reds, as above

=== Twenty20 ===
- Highest team total: 195 for 5 by Northern Knights v Munster Reds, 2018
- Lowest team total: 92 for 5 by Munster Reds v Northern Knights, 2017
- Highest individual innings: 80 by Gary Wilson for Northern Knights v Munster Reds, 2018
- Best bowling in an innings: 3-12 by Stephanus Grobler for Munster Reds v Northern Knights, 2017
