= 2021 Bangladeshi cricket season =

Cricket season

2020–21 Bangabandhu ODI Series
- Champions: Bangladesh
- Most runs: Tamim Iqbal (158)
- Most wickets: Mehidy Hasan (7)

2020–21 Bangabandhu Test Series
- Champions: West Indies
- Most runs: Kyle Mayers (261)
- Most wickets: Rahkeem Cornwall (14)

2021 Bangabandhu ODI Series
- Champions: Bangladesh
- Most runs: Mushfiqur Rahim (237)
- Most wickets: Dushmantha Chameera (9)

The 2021 Bangladeshi cricket season is taking place from 20 January to 31 December 2021. A total of 29 international matches, including 4 Test, 9 One Day International and 16 Twenty20 International matches are scheduled to take place in Bangladesh in 2021. 72 first-class, 5 List A and 54 Twenty20 matches are also being held in this season. All the international matches will form part of the 2020–2023 ICC Cricket World Cup Super League, 2019–2021 ICC World Test Championship, 2021–2023 ICC World Test Championship and the preparation for the ICC Men's T20 World Cup.

Two international sides– West Indies and Sri Lanka toured Bangladesh, while four international sides– Australia, England, New Zealand and Pakistan are yet to come to Bangladesh in 2021. One second-tier international team– Ireland Wolves also toured Bangladesh in this season. Among the domestic tournaments, three first-class and one Twenty20 tournaments– 2020–21 National Cricket League, 2021 Dhaka Premier Division Twenty20 Cricket League, 2021–22 National Cricket League and 2021–22 Bangladesh Cricket League are scheduled to take place in 2021.

As of June 2021, Bangladesh has been most successful in ODIs in the 2021 season, having won 5 of its 6 matches. The team also played 2 Test matches in this season, having lost all of them. The West Indies won the most number of Test matches than any other team, winning 2 of its 2 matches.

The impact of the COVID-19 pandemic continued into the 2021 Bangladeshi international calendar. In December 2020, one Test and three T20I matches of Bangladesh's home series against West Indies were dropped from the tour itinerary as per request made by Cricket West Indies to prevent any sort of health risks. During the Ireland Wolves' tour of Bangladesh in March 2021, the first unofficial ODI match was abandoned after 30 overs, after Ruhan Pretorius tested positive for COVID-19. However, Pretorius' test was later found to be a false positive, with him returning to the squad for the second match. The original tour schedule included two Twenty20 matches, but one was dropped from the itinerary on 13 March 2021. On 1 April 2021, the remaining matches of the 22nd NCL were postponed due to the rising COVID-19 cases in the country. Originally, the 2021 DPL was scheduled to start on 6 May 2021. However, in April 2021, the tournament was postponed until 31 May 2021, due to the nationwide COVID-19 lockdown.

== Season overview ==
International tours
Start date	End date	Away team	Results [Matches]		
Start date	End date	Away team	Test	ODI	T20I
20 January 2021	15 February 2021	West Indies	0–2 [2]	3–0 [3]	—
23 May 2021	28 May 2021	Sri Lanka	—	2–1 [3]	—
August 2021	August 2021	Australia	—	—	4–1 [5]
6 September 2021	14 September 2021	New Zealand	—	—	3–2 [5]
20 September 2021	11 October 2021	England (Note: The series has been rescheduled for March 2023)	—	[3]	[3]
16 November 2021	14 December 2021	Pakistan	[2]	—	[3]

Domestic tournaments
Start date	End date	Tournament	Winners
20 March 2021	Postponed	2020–21 NCL	
31 May 2021	17 June 2021	2021 DPL Twenty20	
15 October 2021	25 November 2021	2021–22 NCL	
1 December 2021	7 January 2022	2021–22 BCL	

Second-tier international tours
Start date	End date	Away team	Results [Matches]		
Start date	End date	Away team	FC	LA	T20
26 February 2021	16 March 2021	Ireland Wolves	1–0 [1]	4–0 [5]	1–0 [1]

== International tours ==
=== West Indies in Bangladesh ===
The West Indian cricket team toured Bangladesh in January and February 2021 to play two Tests and three One Day International (ODI) matches. Bangladesh won the opening match of the ODI series by six wickets, with more than 16 overs to spare. Bangladesh won the second ODI by seven wickets, while chasing the target of 149, to take an unassailable lead in the series. Bangladesh also conquered the third and final ODI by 120 runs, after they had lift the West Indies a target of 298, taking the series 3–0. Mustafizur Rahman of Bangladesh bagged his 200th international wicket in that match.

The West Indies won the first Test by three wickets, with Kyle Mayers scoring an unbeaten double century on debut to become only the 6th batsman to do so. Mehidy Hasan smashed his first century in Test cricket, while Mominul Haque became the first batsman for Bangladesh to score ten centuries in Tests, and scored his 3,000th run in Tests. This was also the fifth-highest successful run chase in the fourth innings of a Test, and the highest successful run chase in Asia. The West Indies also won the second Test, by 17 runs, to take the series 2–0. Rahkeem Cornwall of the West Indies captured a five-wicket haul in the first-innings, and Mehidy Hasan became the fastest bowler for Bangladesh, in terms of matches, to take 100 wickets in Tests when he picked up the wicket of Shayne Moseley.

2020–2023 ICC Cricket World Cup Super League – ODI series
No.	Date	Home captain	Away captain	Venue	Result
1st ODI	20 January	Tamim Iqbal	Jason Mohammed	Sher-e-Bangla National Cricket Stadium, Dhaka	Bangladesh by 6 wickets
2nd ODI	22 January	Tamim Iqbal	Jason Mohammed	Sher-e-Bangla National Cricket Stadium, Dhaka	Bangladesh by 7 wickets
3rd ODI	25 January	Tamim Iqbal	Jason Mohammed	Zohur Ahmed Chowdhury Stadium, Chittagong	Bangladesh by 120 runs
2019–2021 ICC World Test Championship – Test series
No.	Date	Home captain	Away captain	Venue	Result
1st Test	3–7 February	Mominul Haque	Kraigg Brathwaite	Zohur Ahmed Chowdhury Stadium, Chittagong	West Indies by 3 wickets
2nd Test	11–15 February	Mominul Haque	Kraigg Brathwaite	Sher-e-Bangla National Cricket Stadium, Dhaka	West Indies by 17 runs

=== Sri Lanka in Bangladesh ===
The Sri Lankan cricket team toured Bangladesh in May 2021 to play three One Day International (ODI) matches. Bangladesh won the first ODI by 33 runs. They also won the rain-affected second ODI by 103 runs, to take an unassailable lead in the series. Mushfiqur Rahim hit his 8th ODI century, scoring 125 runs off 127 balls, which helped his side get out of the trouble and post a challenging total on the board. It was Bangladesh's first bilateral series win against Sri Lanka. Sri Lanka won the third match as a consolation victory by 97 runs with Bangladesh winning the series 2–1. Dushmantha Chameera of Sri Lanka took his first five-wicket haul in ODIs and was named the player of the match. Taskin Ahmed of Bangladesh picked up his 50th wicket in ODIs, when Pathum Nissanka was caught behind during the final ball of the 11th over.

2020–2023 ICC Cricket World Cup Super League – ODI series
No.	Date	Home captain	Away captain	Venue	Result
1st ODI	23 May	Tamim Iqbal	Kusal Perera	Sher-e-Bangla National Cricket Stadium, Dhaka	Bangladesh by 33 runs
2nd ODI	25 May	Tamim Iqbal	Kusal Perera	Sher-e-Bangla National Cricket Stadium, Dhaka	Bangladesh by 103 runs (DLS)
3rd ODI	28 May	Tamim Iqbal	Kusal Perera	Sher-e-Bangla National Cricket Stadium, Dhaka	Sri Lanka by 97 runs

=== Australia in Bangladesh ===
The Australian cricket team are scheduled to tour Bangladesh in August 2021 to play five Twenty20 International (T20I) matches. The matches will be used as preparation ahead of the 2021 ICC Men's T20 World Cup.

T20I series
No.	Date	Home captain	Away captain	Venue	Result
T20I 1210	3 August	Mahmudullah	Matthew Wade	Sher-e-Bangla National Cricket Stadium, Dhaka	Bangladesh by 23 runs
T20I 1212	4 August	Mahmudullah	Matthew Wade	Sher-e-Bangla National Cricket Stadium, Dhaka	Bangladesh by 5 wickets
T20I 1216	6 August	Mahmudullah	Matthew Wade	Sher-e-Bangla National Cricket Stadium, Dhaka	Bangladesh by 10 runs
T20I 1218	7 August	Mahmudullah	Matthew Wade	Sher-e-Bangla National Cricket Stadium, Dhaka	Australia by 3 wickets
T20I 1222	9 August	Mahmudullah	Matthew Wade	Sher-e-Bangla National Cricket Stadium, Dhaka	Bangladesh by 60 runs

=== New Zealand in Bangladesh ===
The New Zealand cricket team are scheduled to tour Bangladesh in September 2021 to play five Twenty20 International (T20I) matches. The matches will be used as preparation ahead of the 2021 ICC Men's T20 World Cup.

T20I series
No.	Date	Home captain	Away captain	Venue	Result
T20I 1243	1 September	Mahmudullah	Tom Latham	Sher-e-Bangla National Cricket Stadium, Dhaka	Bangladesh by 7 wickets
T20I 1251	3 September	Mahmudullah	Tom Latham	Sher-e-Bangla National Cricket Stadium, Dhaka	Bangladesh by 4 runs
T20I 1259	5 September	Mahmudullah	Tom Latham	Sher-e-Bangla National Cricket Stadium, Dhaka	New Zealand by 52 runs
T20I 1260	8 September	Mahmudullah	Tom Latham	Sher-e-Bangla National Cricket Stadium, Dhaka	Bangladesh by 6 wickets
T20I 1263	10 September	Mahmudullah	Tom Latham	Sher-e-Bangla National Cricket Stadium, Dhaka	New Zealand by 27 runs

=== England in Bangladesh ===
The English cricket team are scheduled to tour Bangladesh in September and October 2021 to play three One Day International (ODI) and three Twenty20 International (T20I) matches. The T20I matches will be used as preparation ahead of the 2021 ICC Men's T20 World Cup.

=== Pakistan in Bangladesh ===
The Pakistan cricket team are scheduled to tour Bangladesh in November and December 2021 to play two Test and three Twenty20 International (T20I) matches.

== Second-tier international tours ==
=== Ireland Wolves in Bangladesh ===
The Ireland Wolves cricket team toured Bangladesh in February and March 2021 to play an unofficial Test match (with First-class status), five unofficial One Day International matches (with List A status) and one unofficial Twenty20 International match (with Twenty20 status) against the Bangladesh Emerging team. In the only first-class match, the Bangladesh Emerging team won by an innings and 23 runs, as Tanvir Islam took thirteen wickets in the match, including 8/51 in the second innings.

The first unofficial ODI match was abandoned after 30 overs, after Ruhan Pretorius tested positive for COVID-19. Bangladesh Emerging team successfully chased the target of 264 to win the second List A match by 4 wickets. The hosts also won the third unofficial ODI, guided by Saif Hassan's century, to take an unassailable lead in the series. Bangladesh won the fourth one day match by 8 wickets, and the final List A match by 5 runs in a thriller, to whitewash the Irish team. The only T20 match was also conquered by Bangladesh Emerging team at a margin of 30 runs, as the visitors left Bangladesh without a win. Sumon Khan captured a four wicket haul for 28 runs to bowl out the visitors for 154.

== Domestic tournaments ==
=== 2020–21 National Cricket League ===
The 2020–21 National Cricket League is the twenty-second edition of the National Cricket League (NCL), a first-class cricket competition that is being held in Bangladesh. The tournament started on 22 March 2021, with the Bangladesh Cricket Board (BCB) using the tournament as preparation for Bangladesh's tour of Sri Lanka in April 2021.

=== 2021 Dhaka Premier Division Twenty20 Cricket League ===
The 2021 Dhaka Premier Division Twenty20 Cricket League is the second edition of the Dhaka Premier Division Twenty20 Cricket League, a Twenty20 cricket competition that is being held in Bangladesh. The tournament started on 31 May 2021, with twelve teams featuring in the league in Twenty20 format. On 28 May 2021, the BCB released the schedule for the first 30 matches of the tournament. All the matches of the second round of the league were abandoned and all the remaining matches were moved forward by one day due to rain. On 4 June 2021, BCB announced the revised fixtures from fourth to seventh round. On 17 June 2021, the dates of Super League fixture were announced, where top six teams of Group stage points table were advanced to the next round.

=== 2021–22 National Cricket League ===
The 2021–22 National Cricket League will be the twenty-third edition of the National Cricket League (NCL), a first-class cricket competition that is scheduled to be held in Bangladesh from 15 October to 25 November 2021.

=== 2021–22 Bangladesh Cricket League ===
The 2021–22 Bangladesh Cricket League will be the ninth edition of the Bangladesh Cricket League (BCL), a first-class cricket competition that is scheduled to be held in Bangladesh from 1 December 2021 to 7 January 2022.

== Honours ==
Date	Award	Team	Opponent	Tournament/Series	Ref.
25 January 2021	Champions	Bangladesh	West Indies	2020–21 Bangabandhu ODI Series	
28 February 2021	Champions	Bangladesh Emerging	Ireland Wolves	2020–21 Bangladesh A vs Ireland A Unofficial Test Series	
14 March 2021	Champions	Bangladesh Emerging	Ireland Wolves	2020–21 Bangladesh A vs Ireland A Unofficial ODI Series	
16 March 2021	Champions	Bangladesh Emerging	Ireland Wolves	2020–21 Bangladesh A vs Ireland A Unofficial ODI Series	
28 May 2021	Champions	Bangladesh	Sri Lanka	2021 Bangabandhu ODI Series	
9 August 2021	Champions	Bangladesh	Australia	2021 Bangabandhu T20I Series	
1 September 2021	Champions	Bangladesh	Australia	2021 Bangabandhu T20I Series	

== International statistics ==
=== Most Runs ===
Test
Player	Mat	Inns	Runs	Ave	HS	100	50
(Cricket West Indies) Kyle Mayers	2	4	261	87.00	210*	1	0
(Cricket West Indies) Nkrumah Bonner	2	4	231	57.75	90	0	2
(Bangladesh) Liton Das	2	4	200	50.00	71	0	2
One Day International
Player	Mat	Inns	Runs	Ave	HS	100	50
(Bangladesh) Mushfiqur Rahim	6	6	329	82.25	125	1	2
(Bangladesh) Tamim Iqbal	6	6	240	40.00	64	0	3
(Bangladesh) Mahmudullah	6	5	221	73.66	64*	0	3
Last updated on 14 July 2021

=== Most Wickets ===
Test
Player	Mat	Inns	Wkts	BBI	Ave	Econ	5WI	10WM
(Cricket West Indies) Rahkeem Cornwall	2	4	14	5/74	26.71	2.84	1	0
(Bangladesh) Taijul Islam	2	4	12	4/36	26.58	2.19	0	0
(Bangladesh) Mehidy Hasan	2	4	10	4/58	26.10	2.61	0	0
One Day International
Player	Mat	Inns	Wkts	BBI	Ave	Econ	4WI	5WI
(Bangladesh) Mehidy Hasan	6	6	14	4/25	12.71	3.14	2	0
(Bangladesh) Mustafizur Rahman	6	6	12	3/16	13.00	3.46	0	0
(Sri Lanka) Dushmantha Chameera	3	3	9	5/16	11.00	3.78	0	1
Last updated on 14 July 2021								

=== Results summary ===
Team	Matches	Won	Lost	Draw	No Result	% Won
Test
Bangladesh	2	0	2	0	0	0.00
West Indies	2	2	0	0	0	100.00
One Day International
Bangladesh	6	5	1	0	0	83.33
Sri Lanka	3	1	2	0	0	33.33
West Indies	2	0	2	0	0	0.00
Last updated on 14 July 2021

== Broadcasting rights ==
In January 2021, the BCB sold its media rights to Ban Tech, a marketing agency of Bangladesh for ৳179 million (US$2.2 million), for the home series against the West Indies. As the broadcast partners of Ban-Tech, T Sports and Nagorik TV also acquired the rights for broadcasting the matches live on television. BCB chief executive Nizamuddin Chowdhury said, "Ban-Tech won the rights for being the highest bidder, they have got their own channel or else they can show it through other channels."

On 7 May 2021, T Sports also acquired the telecasting rights for all Indian international cricket matches live in Bangladesh. On 17 May 2021, the BCB sold its media rights to Ban Tech for the next three years, for $19.07 million, ahead of their home series against Sri Lanka. Under the agreement with Ban Tech, T Sports and Gazi TV bought and obtained the rights for broadcasting the matches of the series on television.

== Sponsorship rights ==
In January 2021, the BCB announced that the BEXIMCO, the country's leading corporate house, would be the sponsor of the Bangladesh cricket team for their home series against West Indies. The BCB's CEO Nizamuddin Chowdhury said, "Beximco is one of the most prominent brands in the country and is also renowned globally." He added, "It has a proud and long tradition of partnering and supporting the BCB and Bangladesh cricket. We are very pleased to declare Beximco as the national team sponsor."

However, in April 2021, Daraz, an e-commerce platform, was named as the new sponsor of the Bangladesh national men's, women's, U-19 and the A cricket team. Daraz were awarded the rights by the BCB until 2023, under which its logo will appear on the kits of the teams. Syed Mostahidal Hoq, Daraz's managing director expressed his delight saying, "This is an auspicious moment for us because it always gives you immense pleasure to be able to do something for the country. By sponsoring our national cricket team we feel that we have become a part of the passion and glory associated with the game in Bangladesh and we look forward to celebrating many achievements in the years to come."

== Controversies ==
In May 2021, Tamim used inappropriate language during the third ODI against Sri Lanka after an unsuccessful review of his caught-behind dismissal. As a result, he was fined 15% of his total match fee for breaching Level 1 of the ICC Cricket Code of Conduct, although later, Tamim admitted the offence and accepted the sanction proposed by ICC match referee Niamur Rashid.

In June 2021, during the 40th group match between Abahani Limited and Mohammedan Sporting Club of the 2021 Dhaka Premier League, Shakib kicked and broke the stumps after umpire Imran Parvez turned down a LBW appeal. He was bowling against Mushfiqur Rahim in the fifth over of the innings and kicked the stumps as soon as the umpire refused to concede to his appeal. In the same match, he also himself uprooted the stumps when the umpire halted the match due to rain in the following over. However, Shakib later made a public apology statement through his official Facebook page calling his behaviour as a "human error". Following the incident, Shakib was suspended for three matches of the tournament and was fined ৳5 lakh (US$4,100) by the BCB. The BCB also announced that a panel would be set up to investigate claims of biased umpiring in domestic cricket.

On 16 June 2021, Sheikh Jamal Dhanmondi Club lodged a complaint against Rahman, who was playing for Legends of Rupganj, for allegedly racially abusing and throwing stones at Elias Sunny, who was playing for Sheikh Jamal Dhanmondi. The alleged incident took place during a T20 match between Sheikh Jamal Dhanmondi and Old DOHS Sports Club during the Dhaka Premier Division T20 League at the Bangladesh Krira Shikkha Protisthan (BKSP) ground no. 3 in Dhaka. Rahman, who had a game against Partex Sporting Club at the BKSP 4 ground later in the day, abused and threw stones at Sunny, who was fielding at the time, while Rahman was standing outside the boundary. This incident caused the game to be paused for a few minutes. Sunny has alleged that this is not an isolated incident and that this is a continuation of a previous incident where Rahman had racially abused Sunny while the two were playing against each other in a previous match. The Cricket Committee of Dhaka Metropolis (CCDM) is investigating this incident. Following the investigation, Rahman, along with Sheikh Jamal Dhanmondi manager Sultan Mahmud, was fined 50,000 taka (US$590).
