= Bangladesh A cricket team in Ireland in 2018 =

	Ireland Wolves	Bangladesh A
- Dates: 1 – 17 August 2018
Captains	Andrew Balbirnie	Mominul Haque (LA); Soumya Sarkar (T20)

Twenty20 International series
- Results: Bangladesh A won the 3 (unofficial)-match series 2–1
Most runs	William Porterfield (137)	Soumya Sarkar (115)
Most wickets	Andy McBrine (5)	Mohammad Saifuddin (9)

LA series
- Result: 5-match series drawn 2–2
Most runs	Andrew Balbirnie (300)	Mominul Haque (297)
Most wickets	Peter Chase (9)	Khaled Ahmed (10)

The Bangladesh A cricket team toured Ireland to play 5 Unofficial ODIs and 3 Unofficial T20s in August 2018.

The List-A series was drawn 2–2. Bangladesh A won the T20 series 2–1.

== Squads ==
List-A		T20	
Bangladesh A	Ireland Wolves	Bangladesh A	Ireland Wolves
Mominul Haque (c); Saymon Ahmed; Nazmul Hossain Shanto; Fazle Mahmud; Afif Hossain; Khaled Ahmed; Shoriful Islam; Al-Amin; Zakir Hasan; Nayeem Hasan; Sunzamul Islam; Nurul Hasan; Mohammad Saifuddin; Mizanur Rahman; Saif Hassan; Taskin Ahmed; Mohammad Mithun	Andrew Balbirnie (c); David Delany; Peter Chase; Jonathan Garth; Shane Getkate; Tyrone Kane; Graham Kennedy; Andy McBrine; Barry McCarthy; James McCollum; James Shannon; Simi Singh; Harry Tector; Stuart Thompson; Lorcan Tucker; George Dockrell	Soumya Sarkar (c); Mominul Haque; Nazmul Hossain Shanto; Fazle Mahmud; Afif Hossain; Al-Amin; Khaled Ahmed; Shoriful Islam; Zakir Hasan; Nayeem Hasan; Sunzamul Islam; Nurul Hasan; Mizanur Rahman; Mohammad Saifuddin; Saif Hassan; Taskin Ahmed; Taijul Islam; Mohammad Mithun	Andrew Balbirnie (c); Peter Chase; David Delany; George Dockrell; Tyrone Kane; Andy McBrine; Barry McCarthy; Kevin O'Brien; William Porterfield; James Shannon; Simi Singh; Stuart Thompson; Lorcan Tucker; Gareth Delany; Shane Getkate; Joshua Little

== List A series ==
=== 1st Unofficial ODI ===
1 August 2018
10:45
Scorecard

Ireland Wolves; 37/1 (5 overs)	v	Bangladesh A
James McCollum 26* (17); Khaled Ahmed 1/21 (3 overs)

No result
Oak Hill Cricket Club Ground, Wicklow
Umpires: Mark Hawthorne (Ire) and Philip Thompson (Ire)

- Bangladesh A won the toss and elected to field.
- Match was reduced to 28 overs per side due to rain.
- Jonathan Garth (Ireland Wolves) made his List A debut.

=== 2nd Unofficial ODI ===
3 August 2018
10:45
Scorecard

Bangladesh A 289/6 (50 overs)	v	Ireland Wolves; 202 (46.3 overs)
Zakir Hasan 92 (92); Peter Chase 3/63 (10 overs)		Tyrone Kane 49 (40); Shoriful Islam 3/40 (9 overs)

Bangladesh A won by 87 runs
Oak Hill Cricket Club Ground, Wicklow
Umpires: Mark Hawthorne (Ire) and Philip Thompson (Ire)

- Ireland Wolves won the toss and elected to field.

=== 3rd Unofficial ODI ===
5 August 2018
10:45
Scorecard

Ireland Wolves; 245 (49.3 overs)	v	Bangladesh A 211 (46.3 overs)
Stuart Thompson 68 (91); Khaled Ahmed 4/42 (10 overs)		Mominul Haque 46 (66); Tyrone Kane 4/24 (8 overs)

Ireland Wolves won by 34 runs
Oak Hill Cricket Club Ground, Wicklow
Umpires: Mark Hawthorne (Ire) and Philip Thompson (Ire)

- Bangladesh A won the toss and elected to field.

=== 4th Unofficial ODI ===
8 August 2018
10:45
Scorecard

Bangladesh A 386/4 (50 overs)	v	Ireland Wolves; 301 (46.1 overs)
Mominul Haque 182 (133); Andy McBrine 1/45 (10 overs)		Andrew Balbirnie 106 (111); Fazle Mahmud 3/47 (10 overs)

Bangladesh A won by 85 runs
The Vineyard, Dublin
Umpires: Mark Hawthorne (Ire) and Jareth McCready (Ire)

- Bangladesh A won the toss and elected to bat.

=== 5th Unofficial ODI ===
10 August 2018
10:45
Scorecard

Bangladesh A 283/8 (50 overs)	v	Ireland Wolves; 285/2 (46.4 overs)
Fazle Mahmud 74 (63); Peter Chase 5/42 (10 overs)		Andrew Balbirnie 160* (144); Shoriful Islam 1/45 (8.4 overs)

Ireland Wolves won by 8 wickets
Castle Avenue, Dublin
Umpires: Azam Baig (Ire) and Jareth McCready (Ire)

- Bangladesh A won the toss and elected to bat.

== T20 series ==
=== 1st Unofficial T20 ===
13 August 2018
16:00 (D/N)
Scorecard

Ireland Wolves; 152 (20 overs)	v	Bangladesh A 155/6 (18 overs)
Simi Singh 41 (37); Mohammad Saifuddin 2/21 (4 overs)		Soumya Sarkar 57 (41); Andy McBrine 3/23 (4 overs)

Bangladesh A won by 4 wickets
Castle Avenue, Dublin
Umpires: Jareth McCready (Ire) and Paul Reynolds (Ire)

- Ireland Wolves won the toss and elected to bat.
- Shoriful Islam (Bangladesh A) made his T20 debut.

=== 2nd Unofficial T20 ===
16 August 2018 (Note: The 2nd Unofficial T20 was originally scheduled to be played on 15 August at 16:00, but was rescheduled the next day due to rain.)
13:00
Scorecard

Ireland Wolves; 202/6 (20 overs)	v	Bangladesh A 104/7 (15 overs)
Stuart Thompson 47 (38); Mohammad Saifuddin 3/33 (4 overs)		Nayeem Hasan 24* (25); David Delany 2/15 (2 overs)

Ireland Wolves won by 51 runs (D/L method)
The Village, Malahide (Note: The 2nd Unofficial T20 was originally scheduled to be played at Castle Avenue, Dublin.)
Umpires: Paul Reynolds (Ire) and Mary Waldron (Ire)

- Bangladesh A won the toss and elected to field.
- Rain stopped play during Bangladesh A innings.

=== 3rd Unofficial T20 ===
17 August 2018
16:00 (D/N)
Scorecard

Ireland Wolves; 183/5 (18 overs)	v	Bangladesh A 187/4 (16.5 overs)
William Porterfield 78 (39); Mohammad Saifuddin 4/28 (4 overs)		Mohammad Mithun 80 (39); Shane Getkate 3/36 (4 overs)

Bangladesh A won by 6 wickets
The Village, Malahide
Umpires: Michael Foster (Ire) and Paul Reynolds (Ire)

- Ireland Wolves won the toss and elected to bat.
- Match was reduced to 18 overs per side due to rain.
