= 2017 Ireland Tri-Nation Series =

International cricket tournament

- Date: 10–24 May 2017
- Location: Ireland
- Result: New Zealand won the series
- Player of the series: (New Zealand) Tom Latham
Teams
Ireland	Bangladesh	New Zealand
Captains
William Porterfield	Mashrafe Mortaza	Tom Latham
Most runs
Niall O'Brien (144)	Tamim Iqbal (199)	Tom Latham (257)
Most wickets
Peter Chase (6)	Mustafizur Rahman (7)	Mitchell Santner (8)

The 2017 Ireland Tri-Nation Series was a One Day International cricket tournament that took place in Ireland in May 2017. It was a tri-nation series between Ireland, Bangladesh and New Zealand. The matches were in preparation for the 2017 ICC Champions Trophy, which took place in June 2017 in England and Wales. Cricket Ireland announced the full fixtures in July 2016. Ahead of the ODI fixtures, Ireland played two warm-up matches; a 50-over match against Bangladesh and a 25-over match against New Zealand.

Prior to the tournament, Bangladesh's captain Mashrafe Mortaza was suspended for one match for maintaining a slow over-rate in the third ODI between Sri Lanka and Bangladesh in April 2017. Shakib Al Hasan captained Bangladesh for the first match.

New Zealand won the tournament, after they beat Ireland by 190 runs in the fifth ODI of the competition.

== Squads ==
Ireland	Bangladesh	New Zealand
William Porterfield (c); Andrew Balbirnie; Peter Chase; George Dockrell; Ed Joyce; Tim Murtagh; Barry McCarthy; Kevin O'Brien; Niall O'Brien (wk); Simi Singh; Paul Stirling; Stuart Thompson; Gary Wilson (wk); Craig Young	Mashrafe Mortaza (c); Taskin Ahmed; Shakib Al Hasan; Mehedi Hasan; Nurul Hasan; Mosaddek Hossain; Nasir Hossain; Rubel Hossain; Tamim Iqbal; Shafiul Islam; Sunzamul Islam; Imrul Kayes; Mahmudullah; Mushfiqur Rahim (wk); Mustafizur Rahman; Sabbir Rahman; Subashis Roy; Soumya Sarkar	Tom Latham (c, wk); Corey Anderson; Hamish Bennett; Neil Broom; Matt Henry; Scott Kuggeleijn; Adam Milne; Colin Munro; James Neesham; Henry Nicholls; Jeetan Patel; Seth Rance; Luke Ronchi (wk); Mitchell Santner; Ish Sodhi; Ross Taylor; Neil Wagner; George Worker

New Zealand Cricket announced their ODI squad in early April 2017, with ten international players being unavailable because of their commitments to the 2017 Indian Premier League. Jeetan Patel joined New Zealand's squad for their fourth ODI and players involved in the IPL joined the squad on a case-by-case basis. Adam Milne, Corey Anderson and Matt Henry were added to New Zealand's squad ahead of the match against Ireland on 21 May 2017.

== Points table ==
Pos	Team	Pld	W	L	T	NR	BP	Pts	NRR
1	New Zealand	4	3	1	0	0	0	12	1.240
2	Bangladesh	4	2	1	0	1	0	10	0.851
3	Ireland	4	0	3	0	1	0	2	−2.589

Source: Cricinfo

== Practice matches ==
=== 50-overs: Ireland A v Bangladeshis ===
10 May 2017
Scorecard

Bangladeshis; 394/7 (50 overs)	v	Ireland A 195 (41.2 overs)
Sabbir Rahman 100 (86); Shane Getkate 3/60 (7 overs)		Jack Tector 60 (91); Mustafizur Rahman 2/17 (5.2 overs)

Bangladeshis won by 199 runs
Stormont, Belfast
Umpires: Roland Black (Ire) and Alan Neill (Ire)

- Bangladeshis won the toss and elected to bat.
- 13 players per side, 11 batting, 11 fielding.

=== 25-overs: Ireland A v New Zealanders ===
11 May 2017
Scorecard

New Zealanders; 234/6 (25 overs)	v	Ireland A 149/9 (25 overs)
Tom Latham 52 (37); Eddie Richardson 2/43 (5 overs)		Sean Terry 65 (56); Seth Rance 4/13 (4 overs)

New Zealanders won by 85 runs
Observatory Lane, Dublin
Umpires: Azam Baig (Ire) and Paul Reynolds (Ire)

- New Zealanders won the toss and elected to bat.
- 12 players per side, 11 batting, 11 fielding.

== ODI matches ==
=== 1st ODI ===
12 May 2017
12 (D/N)
Scorecard

Bangladesh; 157/4 (31.1 overs)	v	Ireland
Tamim Iqbal 64* (88); Peter Chase 3/33 (6 overs)

No result
Malahide Cricket Club Ground, Dublin
Umpires: Ian Gould (Eng) and Mark Hawthorne (Ire)

- Ireland won the toss and elected to field.
- Rain stopped play during Bangladesh's innings with no further play possible.
- Points: Ireland 2, Bangladesh 2.

=== 2nd ODI ===
14 May 2017
Scorecard

New Zealand; 289/7 (50 overs)	v	Ireland; 238 (45.3 overs)
Neil Broom 79 (63); Barry McCarthy 2/59 (10 overs)		Niall O'Brien 109 (131); Mitchell Santner 5/50 (10 overs)

New Zealand won by 51 runs
Malahide Cricket Club Ground, Dublin
Umpires: Mark Hawthorne (Ire) and Nigel Llong (Eng)
Player of the match: Mitchell Santner (NZ)

- Ireland won the toss and elected to field.
- Simi Singh (Ire), Scott Kuggeleijn and Seth Rance (NZ) all made their ODI debuts.
- Tom Latham played his first ODI as captain of New Zealand.
- Niall O'Brien (Ire) scored his first century in an ODI.
- Mitchell Santner (NZ) took his first five-wicket haul in an ODI.
- Points: New Zealand 4, Ireland 0.

=== 3rd ODI ===
17 May 2017
Scorecard

Bangladesh; 257/9 (50 overs)	v	New Zealand; 258/6 (47.3 overs)
Soumya Sarkar 61 (67); Hamish Bennett 3/31 (10 overs)		Tom Latham 54 (64); Mustafizur Rahman 2/33 (9 overs)

New Zealand won by 4 wickets
Clontarf Cricket Club Ground, Dublin
Umpires: Ian Gould (Eng) and Alan Neill (Ire)
Player of the match: James Neesham (NZ)

- New Zealand won the toss and elected to field.
- This was the first match at this venue between two Full Member teams.
- Points: New Zealand 4, Bangladesh 0.

=== 4th ODI ===
19 May 2017
Scorecard

Ireland; 181 (46.3 overs)	v	Bangladesh; 182/2 (27.1 overs)
Ed Joyce 46 (74); Mustafizur Rahman 4/23 (9 overs)		Soumya Sarkar 87* (68); Kevin O'Brien 1/22 (5.1 overs)

Bangladesh won by 8 wickets
Malahide Cricket Club Ground, Dublin
Umpires: Roland Black (Ire) and Ruchira Palliyaguruge (SL)
Player of the match: Mustafizur Rahman (Ban)

- Bangladesh won the toss and elected to field.
- Sunzamul Islam (Ban) made his ODI debut.
- Points: Bangladesh 4, Ireland 0.

=== 5th ODI ===
21 May 2017
Scorecard

New Zealand; 344/6 (50 overs)	v	Ireland; 154 (39.3 overs)
Tom Latham 104 (111); Peter Chase 2/69 (8 overs)		William Porterfield 48 (50); Matt Henry 3/36 (8 overs)

New Zealand won by 190 runs
Malahide Cricket Club Ground, Dublin
Umpires: Alan Neill (Ire) and Joel Wilson (WI)
Player of the match: Tom Latham (NZ)

- Ireland won the toss and elected to field.
- Points: New Zealand 4, Ireland 0.

=== 6th ODI ===
24 May 2017
Scorecard

New Zealand; 270/8 (50 overs)	v	Bangladesh; 271/5 (48.2 overs)
Tom Latham 84 (92); Shakib Al Hasan 2/41 (8 overs)		Tamim Iqbal 65 (80); Jeetan Patel 2/55 (10 overs)

Bangladesh won by 5 wickets
Clontarf Cricket Club Ground, Dublin
Umpires: Roland Black (Ire) and Ruchira Palliyaguruge (SL)
Player of the match: Mushfiqur Rahim (Ban)

- Bangladesh won the toss and elected to field.
- This was Bangladesh's first win away from home against New Zealand in an ODI.
- Mahmudullah became the fifth batsman for Bangladesh to score 3,000 runs in ODIs.
- Points: Bangladesh 4, New Zealand 0.
