= Ireland Wolves cricket team in Sri Lanka in 2018–19 =

Tour of Sri Lanka by the Ireland A cricket team

Ireland Wolves cricket team in Sri Lanka in 2018-19
	Sri Lanka A	Ireland Wolves
- Dates: 1 – 29 January 2019
Captains	Ashan Priyanjan	Harry Tector

FC series
- Result: Sri Lanka A won the 2-match series 1–0
Most runs	Pathum Nissanka (258)	James McCollum (193)
Most wickets	Lasith Embuldeniya (14)	James Cameron-Dow (13)

LA series
- Result: Sri Lanka A won the 5-match series 5–0
Most runs	Avishka Fernando (523)	Lorcan Tucker (223)
Most wickets	Isuru Udana (11)	Peter Chase (5)

The Ireland A cricket team toured Sri Lanka to play 2 first-class matches and 5 List-A matches against Sri Lanka A cricket team Ahead of the First-class series Ireland Wolves team also played a two-day warm-up match against a Sri Lanka Board Presidents XI.

== Tour Match ==
=== Two-day : Sri Lanka Board President XI v/s Ireland Wolves ===
1–2 January 2019
Scorecard

Ireland Wolves	v	SL Board President XI
159 (53.3 overs); Lorcan Tucker 47 (119)		313/7d (68.1 overs); Hashan Dumindu 74 (121); Harry Tector 2/58 (11 overs)
60/4 (24 overs); James McCollum 31 (49)

Match drawn
FTZ Sports Complex, Katunayake
Umpires: Nila de Silva (SL) and Keerthi Bandara (SL)

- Ireland Wolves won the toss and elected to bat

== First-Class series ==
=== 1st Unofficial Test ===
5–7 January 2019
Scorecard

Ireland Wolves	v	Sri Lanka A
153 (45.2 overs); James McCollum 76 (108); Lasith Embuldeniya 4/46 (13.2 overs)		308 (77.1 overs); Milinda Siriwardana 104 (126); James Cameron-Dow 7/77 (26.1 overs)
196 (54.3 overs); James Shannon 32 (47); Lasith Embuldeniya 5/73 (21 overs)		44/0 (6.5 overs); Pathum Nissanka 26* (23)

Sri Lanka A won by 10 wickets
Sinhalese Sports Club Ground, Colombo
Umpires: Hemantha Boteju (SL) and Deepal Gunawardene (SL)

- Ireland Wolves won the toss and elected to bat
- Jonathan Garth (Ire A) made his first-class debut.

=== 2nd Unofficial Test ===
13–16 January 2019
Scorecard

Ireland Wolves	v	Sri Lanka A
508/8d (138 overs); Neil Rock 85 (198); Chamika Karunaratne 3/99 (25 overs)		303 (73.2 overs); Angelo Perera 127 (161); James Cameron-Dow 5/99 (25.2 overs)
89/3 (24 overs); James McCollum 45* (65); Lasith Embuldeniya 2/37 (10 overs)		468/7d (105.1 overs) (f/o); Pathum Nissanka 217 (274); Jonathan Garth 3/140 (33.1 overs)

Match drawn
MRIC Stadium, Hambantota
Umpires: Pradeep Udawatta (SL) & Prageeth Rambukwella (SL)

== List A Series ==
=== 1st Unofficial ODI ===
19 January 2019
Scorecard

Sri Lanka A 365/5 (50 overs)	v	Ireland Wolves; 305 (48.2 overs)
Avishka Fernando 128 (120); Stuart Thompson 2/36 (6 overs)		Lorcan Tucker 109 (86); Ishan Jayaratne 3/39 (7.2 overs)

Sri Lanka A won by 60 runs
MRIC Stadium, Hambantota
Umpires: Hemantha Boteju (SL) and Deepal Gunawardene (SL)

- Ireland Wolves won the toss and elected to field.

=== 2nd Unofficial ODI ===
21 January 2019
Scorecard

Sri Lanka A 337/5 (50 overs)	v	Ireland Wolves; 162 (35.5 overs)
Upul Tharanga 103 (112); James Cameron-Dow 1/32 (10 overs)		Shane Getkate 56 (55); Milinda Siriwardana 4/26 (4.5 overs)

Sri Lanka A won by 175 runs
MRIC Stadium, Hambantota
Umpires: Ravindra Kottahachchi (SL) and Deepal Gunawardene (SL)

- Sri Lanka A won the toss and elected to bat.

=== 3rd Unofficial ODI ===
24 January 2019
Scorecard

Ireland Wolves; 268/6 (50 overs)	v	Sri Lanka A 272/2 (31.1 overs)
Harry Tector 103 (111); Isuru Udana 3/45 (10 overs)		Minod Bhanuka 113* (87); James Cameron-Dow 2/77 (10 overs)

Sri Lanka A won by 8 wickets
Sinhalese Sports Club Ground, Colombo
Umpires: Gamini Dissanayake (SL) and Prageeth Rambukwella (SL)

- Ireland Wolves won the toss and elected to bat.

=== 4th Unofficial ODI ===
26 January 2019
Scorecard

Sri Lanka A 353/6 (50 overs)	v	Ireland Wolves; 151 (30.4 overs)
Avishka Fernando 139 (118); Simi Singh 2/39 (10 overs)		Simi Singh 31 (29); Isuru Udana 3/33 (6 overs)

Sri Lanka A won by 202 runs
Sinhalese Sports Club Ground, Colombo
Umpires: Pradeep Udawatta (SL) and Nilan De Silva (SL)

- Sri Lanka A won the toss and elected to bat.

=== 5th Unofficial ODI ===
29 January 2019
Scorecard

Sri Lanka A 403/7 (50 overs)	v	Ireland Wolves; 302 (50 overs)
Upul Tharanga 120 (108); Gareth Delany 3/58 (8 overs)		Neil Rock 78 (56); Asela Gunaratne 4/51 (9 overs)

Sri Lanka A won by 101 runs
R. Premadasa Stadium, Colombo
Umpires: Rohitha Kottahachchi (SL) and Asanga Jayasooriya (SL)

- Sri Lanka A won the toss and elected to bat.
