= Ireland Wolves cricket team in Bangladesh 2017–18 =

Ireland Wolves cricket team in Bangladesh in 2017–18
	Bangladesh A	Ireland Wolves
- Dates: 11 October 2017 – 26 October 2017
Captains	Andrew Balbirnie	Nazmul Hossain Shanto

FC series
- Result: Bangladesh A won the 1-match series 1–0
Most runs	Shadman Islam (133)	Simi Singh (133)
Most wickets	Mahedi Hasan (6); Sunzamul Islam (6)	Andy McBrine (7)

LA series
- Result: Bangladesh A won the 5-match series 4–0
Most runs	Nazmul Hossain Shanto (161)	Andrew Balbirnie (154)
Most wickets	Abu Hider (10)	Barry McCarthy (6)

'The Ireland Wolves team toured Bangladesh in October 2017 to play one first-class match and five limited overs matches against the Bangladesh A team.

== Squads ==
Tests		ODIs	
Ireland Wolves	Bangladesh A	Ireland Wolves	Bangladesh A
Andrew Balbirnie (c); John Anderson; Peter Chase; George Dockrell; Shane Getkate; Andy McBrine; Barry McCarthy; Jacob Mulder; Stuart Poynter; James Shannon; Simi Singh; Nathan Smith; Jack Tector; Sean Terry; Stuart Thompson; Lorcan Tucker	Nazmul Hossain Shanto (c); Shadman Islam; Zakir Hasan; Yasir Ali; Nurul Hasan; Sunzamul Islam; Nayeem Hasan; ~~Saif Hassan~~; Ebadat Hossain; Abu Hider Rony; Kamrul Islam Rabbi; Jubair Hossain; Al-Amin; Mehidy Hasan	Andrew Balbirnie (c); John Anderson; Peter Chase; George Dockrell; Shane Getkate; Andy McBrine; Barry McCarthy; Jacob Mulder; Stuart Poynter; James Shannon; Simi Singh; Nathan Smith; Jack Tector; Sean Terry; Stuart Thompson; Lorcan Tucker	Nazmul Hossain Shanto (c); Shadman Islam; Zakir Hasan; Yasir Ali; Nurul Hasan; Sunzamul Islam; Mahedi Hasan; Abu Hider Rony; Tanbir Hayder; Subashis Roy; Abul Hasan; Nadif Chowdhury; Al-Amin; Imran Ali

Mehidy Hasan replaced Saif Hassan following the former's injury during the fielding session.

== First-class match ==
=== Only Unofficial Test ===
11–14 October 2017
Scorecard

Ireland Wolves	v	Bangladesh A
255 (74.5 overs); Simi Singh 121 (159); Mahedi Hasan 3/47 (13.5 overs)		337 (116.4 overs); Shadman Islam 108 (219); Andy McBrine 3/64 (29.4 overs)
213 (60.2 overs); James Shannon 90 (118); Sunzamul Islam 5/90 (23.2 overs)		132/5 (39.3 overs); Yasir Ali 47* (68); Andy McBrine 4/63 (16.3 overs)

Bangladesh A won by 5 wickets
Sylhet International Cricket Stadium, Sylhet
Umpires: Akteruzzaman (Ban) and Gazi Sohel (Ban)
Player of the match: Shadman Islam (Bangladesh A)

- Ireland Wolves won the toss and elected to bat.

== List A series ==
=== 1st Unofficial ODI ===
17 October
09:00
Scorecard

Ireland Wolves; 229 (49.1 overs)	v	Bangladesh A 75/3 (14 overs)
Sean Terry 65 (64); Abul Hasan 2/40 (7.1 overs)		Zakir Hasan 35* (33); Barry McCarthy 2/23 (4 overs)

No result
Sheikh Kamal International Stadium, Cox's Bazar
Umpires: Mahfuzur Rahman (Ban) and Masudur Rahman (Ban)

- Ireland Wolves won the toss and elected to bat.
- The Bangladesh A innings was stopped after 14 overs due to rain.

=== 2nd Unofficial ODI ===
19 October
09:00
Scorecard

Ireland Wolves; 195 (48.1 overs)	v	Bangladesh A 196/7 (46.3 overs)
Simi Singh 33 (51); Sunzamul Islam 4/33 (9.1 overs)		Tanbir Hayder 61* (91); Jacob Mulder 3/42 (10 overs)

Bangladesh A won by 3 wickets
Sheikh Kamal International Cricket Stadium Academy Ground, Cox's Bazar
Umpires: Mahfuzur Rahman (Ban) and Masudur Rahman (Ban)
Player of the match: Tanbir Hayder (Bangladesh A)

- Ireland Wolves won the toss and elected to bat.

=== 3rd Unofficial ODI ===
24 October
09:00
Scorecard

Ireland Wolves; 103 (35.4 overs)	v	Bangladesh A 106/2 (23 overs)
Andrew Balbirnie 52 (90); Abu Hider 3/29 (8 overs)		Nazmul Hossain Shanto 41* (38); George Dockrell 1/23 (6 overs)

Bangladesh A won by 8 wickets
Sheikh Kamal International Stadium, Cox's Bazar
Umpires: Mahfuzur Rahman (Ban) and Masudur Rahman (Ban)
Player of the match: Abu Hider (Bangladesh A)

- Ireland Wolves won the toss and elected to bat.

=== 4th Unofficial ODI ===
25 October
09:00
Scorecard

Ireland Wolves; 170/7 (20 overs)	v	Bangladesh A 172/6 (19.4 overs)
Andrew Balbirnie 83 (51); Imran Ali 3/33 (4 overs)		Al-Amin 67 (40); Barry McCarthy 2/32 (3 overs)

Bangladesh A won by 4 wickets
Sheikh Kamal International Stadium, Cox's Bazar
Umpires: Tanvir Ahmed (Ban) and Masudur Rahman (Ban)
Player of the match: Andrew Balbirnie (Ireland Wolves)

- Bangladesh A won the toss and elected to field.
- Rain reduced the match to 20 overs per side.

=== 5th Unofficial ODI ===
26 October
09:00
Scorecard

Bangladesh A 286/6 (50 overs)	v	Ireland Wolves; 210 (43.4 overs)
Yasir Ali 102* (101); Barry McCarthy 2/45 (9 overs)		Jack Tector 66 (80); Abu Hider 3/38 (9.4 overs)

Bangladesh A won by 76 runs
Sheikh Kamal International Stadium, Cox's Bazar
Umpires: Tanvir Ahmed (Ban) and Masudur Rahman (Ban)
Player of the match: Yasir Ali (Bangladesh A)

- Ireland Wolves won the toss and elected to field.
