= Ireland Wolves cricket team in Bangladesh in 2020–21 =

International cricket tour

	Bangladesh Emerging	Ireland Wolves
- Dates: 26 February – 16 March 2021
Captains	Saif Hassan	Harry Tector

Twenty20 International series
- Results: Bangladesh Emerging won the 1-match series 1–0
Most runs	Towhid Hridoy (58)	Lorcan Tucker (38)
Most wickets	Sumon Khan (4)	Peter Chase (2)

FC series
- Result: Bangladesh Emerging won the 1-match series 1–0
Most runs	Yasir Ali (92)	Curtis Campher (61)
Most wickets	Tanvir Islam (13)	Mark Adair (3); Graham Hume (3)

LA series
- Result: Bangladesh Emerging won the 5-match series 4–0
Most runs	Mahmudul Hasan Joy (285)	Ruhan Pretorius (142)
Most wickets	Sumon Khan (7)	Mark Adair (5); Ruhan Pretorius (5)
- Player of the series: Mahmudul Hasan Joy (Bangladesh Emerging)

The Ireland Wolves cricket team toured Bangladesh in February and March 2021 to play an unofficial Test match (with First-class status), five unofficial One Day International matches (with List A status) and one unofficial Twenty20 International match (with Twenty20 status) against a Bangladesh Emerging team. The tour was confirmed a day after Ireland's tour of Zimbabwe was cancelled. The original tour schedule included two Twenty20 matches, but one was dropped from the itinerary on 13 March 2021.

The first unofficial ODI match was abandoned after 30 overs, after Ruhan Pretorius tested positive for COVID-19. Ahead of the second ODI, the Bangladesh Cricket Board (BCB) confirmed that the match would take place, after all players returned a negative test. Pretorius' test was later found to be a false positive, with him returning to the squad for the second match.

== Squads ==
First Class		List A		T20	
Bangladesh Emerging	Ireland Wolves	Bangladesh Emerging	Ireland Wolves	Bangladesh Emerging	Ireland Wolves
Saif Hassan (c); Khaled Ahmed; Shahin Alam; Akbar Ali; Yasir Ali; Mahidul Islam Ankon; Noman Chowdhury; Anisul Islam Emon; Parvez Hossain Emon; Rakibul Hasan; Tanzid Hasan; Ebadot Hossain; Rishad Hossain; Shahadat Hossain; Shamim Hossain; Towhid Hridoy; Aminul Islam; Mukidul Islam; Shafiqul Islam; Tanvir Islam; Mahmudul Hasan Joy; Sumon Khan; Rejaur Rahman Raja	Harry Tector (c); Mark Adair; Curtis Campher; Peter Chase; Gareth Delany; Stephen Doheny; Jonathan Garth; Shane Getkate; Graham Hume; Jeremy Lawlor; Josh Little; James McCollum; Ruhan Pretorius; Neil Rock (wk); Lorcan Tucker (wk); Ben White	Saif Hassan (c); Khaled Ahmed; Shahin Alam; Akbar Ali; Yasir Ali; Mahidul Islam Ankon; Noman Chowdhury; Anisul Islam Emon; Parvez Hossain Emon; Rakibul Hasan; Tanzid Hasan; Rishad Hossain; Shahadat Hossain; Shamim Hossain; Towhid Hridoy; Aminul Islam; Mukidul Islam; Shafiqul Islam; Tanvir Islam; Mahmudul Hasan Joy; Sumon Khan; Rejaur Rahman Raja	Harry Tector (c); Mark Adair; Curtis Campher; Peter Chase; Gareth Delany; Stephen Doheny; Jonathan Garth; Shane Getkate; Graham Hume; Jeremy Lawlor; Josh Little; James McCollum; Ruhan Pretorius; Neil Rock (wk); Lorcan Tucker (wk); Ben White	Saif Hassan (c); Shahin Alam; Akbar Ali; Yasir Ali; Mahidul Islam Ankon; Noman Chowdhury; Anisul Islam Emon; Parvez Hossain Emon; Rakibul Hasan; Tanzid Hasan; Rishad Hossain; Shahadat Hossain; Shamim Hossain; Towhid Hridoy; Aminul Islam; Mukidul Islam; Shafiqul Islam; Tanvir Islam; Mahmudul Hasan Joy; Sumon Khan; Rejaur Rahman Raja	Harry Tector (c); Mark Adair; Curtis Campher; Peter Chase; Gareth Delany; Stephen Doheny; Jonathan Garth; Shane Getkate; Graham Hume; Jeremy Lawlor; Josh Little; James McCollum; Ruhan Pretorius; Neil Rock (wk); Lorcan Tucker (wk); Ben White

Originally, George Dockrell was set to captain the Ireland Wolves in the unofficial Test, and Harry Tector would lead the side in the limited overs matches. However, the day before the squad departed for Bangladesh, it was announced that Dockrell had opted out of the tour. The same day, Ruhan Pretorius was added to the squad and Tector was confirmed as captain.

== Unofficial First Class series ==
=== Only unofficial Test ===
26 February – 1 March 2021 (Note: While four days of play was scheduled for the match, it reached a result in three days.)
Scorecard

Ireland Wolves	v	Bangladesh Emerging
151 (67 overs); Curtis Campher 38 (92); Tanvir Islam 5/55 (23 overs)		313 (90.4 overs); Yasir Ali 92 (115); Mark Adair 3/22 (16.4 overs)
139 (74.3 overs); Harry Tector 55 (137); Tanvir Islam 8/51 (28.3 overs)

Bangladesh Emerging won by an innings and 23 runs
Zohur Ahmed Chowdhury Stadium, Chittagong
Umpires: Tanvir Ahmed (Ban) and Morshed Ali Khan (Ban)
Player of the match: Tanvir Islam (Bangladesh Emerging)

- Ireland Wolves won the toss and elected to bat.
- Akbar Ali, Mahmudul Hasan Joy, Shahadat Hossain (Bangladesh Emerging) and Curtis Campher (Ireland Wolves) all made their first-class debuts.

== Unofficial List A series ==
=== 1st unofficial OD ===
5 March 2021
09:00
Scorecard

Bangladesh Emerging; 122/4 (30 overs)	v	Ireland Wolves
Towhid Hridoy 44* (61); Mark Adair 2/19 (6 overs)

No result
Zohur Ahmed Chowdhury Stadium, Chittagong
Umpires: Tanvir Ahmed (Ban) and Morshed Ali Khan (Ban)

- Ireland Wolves won the toss and elected to field.
- Ben White (Ireland Wolves) made his List A debut.
- The match was called off after Ruhan Pretorius (Ireland Wolves) tested positive for COVID-19 during the match.

=== 2nd unofficial OD ===
7 March 2021
09:00
Scorecard

Ireland Wolves; 263/7 (50 overs)	v	Bangladesh Emerging; 264/6 (49.4 overs)
Ruhan Pretorius 90 (125); Rakibul Hasan 2/39 (10 overs)		Mahmudul Hasan Joy 66 (95); Ben White 2/45 (10 overs)

Bangladesh Emerging won by 4 wickets
Zohur Ahmed Chowdhury Stadium, Chittagong
Umpires: Tanvir Ahmed (Ban) and Morshed Ali Khan (Ban)
Player of the match: Shamim Hossain (Bangladesh Emerging)

- Bangladesh Emerging won the toss and elected to field.

=== 3rd unofficial OD ===
9 March 2021
11:00
Scorecard

Ireland Wolves; 260/7 (50 overs)	v	Bangladesh Emerging; 264/4 (45.3 overs)
Lorcan Tucker 82* (52); Mukidul Islam 3/53 (10 overs)		Saif Hassan 120 (125); Gareth Delany 2/52 (10 overs)

Bangladesh Emerging won by 6 wickets
Zohur Ahmed Chowdhury Stadium, Chittagong
Umpires: Tanvir Ahmed (Ban) and Morshed Ali Khan (Ban)
Player of the match: Saif Hassan (Bangladesh Emerging)

- Bangladesh Emerging won the toss and elected to field.

=== 4th unofficial OD ===
12 March 2021
09:00
Scorecard

Ireland Wolves; 182 (46.2 overs)	v	Bangladesh Emerging; 186/2 (41.3 overs)
Mark Adair 40 (49); Sumon Khan 4/31 (8.2 overs)		Towhid Hridoy 88* (97); Peter Chase 2/29 (8 overs)

Bangladesh Emerging won by 8 wickets
Sher-e-Bangla National Cricket Stadium, Dhaka
Umpires: Mahfuzur Rahman (Ban) and Masudur Rahman (Ban)
Player of the match: Sumon Khan (Bangladesh Emerging)

- Bangladesh Emerging won the toss and elected to field.

=== 5th unofficial OD ===
14 March 2021
09:00
Scorecard

Bangladesh Emerging; 260 (49.4 overs)	v	Ireland Wolves; 255/9 (50 overs)
Mahmudul Hasan Joy 123 (135); Mark Adair 3/27 (5.4 overs)		Stephen Doheny 81 (99); Saif Hassan 3/31 (10 overs)

Bangladesh Emerging won by 5 runs
Sher-e-Bangla National Cricket Stadium, Dhaka
Umpires: Mahfuzur Rahman (Ban) and Masudur Rahman (Ban)
Player of the match: Mahmudul Hasan Joy (Bangladesh Emerging)

- Ireland Wolves won the toss and elected to field.
- Shahadat Hossain (Bangladesh Emerging) made his List A debut.

== Unofficial T20 series ==
=== Only unofficial T20 ===
16 March 2021
12:30
Scorecard

Bangladesh Emerging; 184/7 (20 overs)	v	Ireland Wolves; 154 (18.1 overs)
Towhid Hridoy 58 (35); Peter Chase 2/36 (4 overs)		Lorcan Tucker 38 (22); Sumon Khan 4/28 (3.1 overs)

Bangladesh Emerging won by 30 runs
Sher-e-Bangla National Cricket Stadium, Dhaka
Umpires: Shafiuddin Ahmed (Ban) and Masudur Rahman (Ban)
Player of the match: Sumon Khan (Bangladesh Emerging)

- Ireland Wolves won the toss and elected to field.
- Ben White (Ireland Wolves) made his T20 debut.

== See also ==
- Netherlands A cricket team in Ireland in 2021
