= Afghan cricket team in Ireland in 2018 =

International cricket tour

Afghanistan cricket team in Ireland in 2018
	Ireland	Afghanistan
- Dates: 20 – 31 August 2018
Captains	William Porterfield (ODIs); Gary Wilson (T20Is)	Asghar Afghan

One Day International series
- Results: Afghanistan won the 3-match series 2–1
Most runs	Andrew Balbirnie (132)	Rahmat Shah (94)
Most wickets	Tim Murtagh (9)	Rashid Khan (8)
- Player of the series: Rashid Khan (Afg)

Twenty20 International series
- Results: Afghanistan won the 3-match series 2–0
Most runs	Gary Wilson (56)	Hazratullah Zazai (156)
Most wickets	Peter Chase (4)	Rashid Khan (7)
- Player of the series: Hazratullah Zazai (Afg)

The Afghanistan cricket team toured Ireland in August 2018 to play three One Day Internationals (ODIs) and three Twenty20 Internationals (T20Is) matches against the Ireland cricket team. Afghanistan won the T20I series 2–0, after the third match was abandoned due to overnight rain and a wet outfield. Afghanistan won the ODI series 2–1.

The second match of the ODI series was the 100th ODI to be played by Afghanistan. In the same match, Mohammad Nabi became the first cricketer for Afghanistan to play in 100 ODIs.

== Squads ==
ODIs		T20Is	
Ireland	Afghanistan	Ireland	Afghanistan
William Porterfield (c); Andrew Balbirnie; Peter Chase; David Delany; George Dockrell; Tyrone Kane; Josh Little; Andy McBrine; Tim Murtagh; Kevin O'Brien; Niall O'Brien; Boyd Rankin; James Shannon; Simi Singh; Paul Stirling; Gary Wilson	Asghar Afghan (c); Javed Ahmadi; Aftab Alam; Ihsanullah; Rashid Khan; Wafadar Momand; Mohammad Nabi; Gulbadin Naib; Shafiqullah (wk); Rahmat Shah; Hashmatullah Shahidi; Mohammad Shahzad (wk); Sayed Shirzad; Samiullah Shinwari; Mujeeb Ur Rahman; Dawlat Zadran; Najibullah Zadran; Hazratullah Zazai	Gary Wilson (c); Andrew Balbirnie; Peter Chase; David Delany; George Dockrell; Tyrone Kane; Josh Little; Andy McBrine; Kevin O'Brien; William Porterfield; Boyd Rankin; James Shannon; Simi Singh; Paul Stirling; Stuart Thompson	Asghar Afghan (c); Fareed Ahmad; Aftab Alam; Mirwais Ashraf; Usman Ghani; Rashid Khan; Mohammad Nabi; Gulbadin Naib; Shafiqullah; Mohammad Shahzad (wk); Samiullah Shinwari; Mujeeb Ur Rahman; Najibullah Zadran; Hazratullah Zazai

After the initial players were selected, Tyrone Kane was added to Ireland's squads as bowling cover. Josh Little replaced David Delany in Ireland's squad for the third ODI.

== T20I Series ==
=== 1st T20I ===
20 August 2018
16:00 (D/N)
Scorecard

Afghanistan; 160/7 (18 overs)	v	Ireland; 144/9 (18 overs)
Hazratullah Zazai 74 (33); Josh Little 2/20 (4 overs)		Gary Wilson 34 (23); Rashid Khan 3/35 (4 overs)

Afghanistan won by 16 runs
Bready Cricket Club Ground, Magheramason
Umpires: Roland Black (Ire) and Alan Neill (Ire)

- Ireland won the toss and elected to field.
- The match was reduced to 18 overs per side due to rain.
- Hazratullah Zazai scored the fastest fifty for Afghanistan in T20Is (22 balls).
- Mohammad Nabi (Afg) became the sixth player to score 1,000 runs and take 50 wickets in T20Is.

=== 2nd T20I ===
22 August 2018
16:00 (D/N)
Scorecard

Afghanistan; 160/8 (20 overs)	v	Ireland; 79 (15 overs)
Hazratullah Zazai 82 (54); Peter Chase 3/35 (4 overs)		William Porterfield 33 (23); Rashid Khan 4/17 (3 overs)

Afghanistan won by 81 runs
Bready Cricket Club Ground, Magheramason
Umpires: Mark Hawthorne (Ire) and Paul Reynolds (Ire)

- Afghanistan won the toss and elected to bat.
- Paul Reynolds (Ire) stood in his first T20I as an umpire.
- Asghar Afghan (Afg) scored his 1,000th run in T20Is.

=== 3rd T20I ===
24 August 2018
16:00 (D/N)
Scorecard

Ireland	v	Afghanistan

Match abandoned
Bready Cricket Club Ground, Magheramason
Umpires: Mark Hawthorne (Ire) and Alan Neill (Ire)

- No toss.
- No play was possible due to rain and a wet outfield.

== ODI Series ==
=== 1st ODI ===
27 August 2018
10:45
Scorecard

Afghanistan; 227/9 (50 overs)	v	Ireland; 198 (48.3 overs)
Gulbadin Naib 64 (98); Tim Murtagh 4/31 (10 overs)		Andrew Balbirnie 55 (82); Aftab Alam 2/34 (9 overs)

Afghanistan won by 29 runs
Stormont Cricket Ground, Belfast
Umpires: Ian Gould (Eng) and Mark Hawthorne (Ire)

- Ireland won the toss and elected to field.
- Hazratullah Zazai (Afg) made his ODI debut.

=== 2nd ODI ===
29 August 2018
10:45
Scorecard

Afghanistan; 182/9 (50 overs)	v	Ireland; 183/7 (43.5 overs)
Najibullah Zadran 42 (52); Tim Murtagh 4/30 (10 overs)		Andrew Balbirnie 60 (92); Rashid Khan 3/37 (10 overs)

Ireland won by 3 wickets
Stormont Cricket Ground, Belfast
Umpires: Ian Gould (Eng) and Paul Reynolds (Ire)

- Afghanistan won the toss and elected to bat.
- This was Afghanistan's 100th ODI.
- Mohammad Nabi became the first cricketer for Afghanistan to play in 100 ODIs.
- Najibullah Zadran (Afg) scored his 1,000th run in ODIs.

=== 3rd ODI ===
31 August 2018
10:45
Scorecard

Ireland; 124 (36.1 overs)	v	Afghanistan; 127/2 (23.5 overs)
Gary Wilson 23 (36); Rashid Khan 3/18 (8 overs)		Ihsanullah 57* (62); Boyd Rankin 1/30 (7 overs)

Afghanistan won by 8 wickets
Stormont Cricket Ground, Belfast
Umpires: Ian Gould (Eng) and Alan Neill (Ire)

- Ireland won the toss and elected to bat.
