= Noman Chowdhury =

Bangladeshi cricketer (born 2001)

Personal information
- Born: 15 August 2001 (age 25)
- Batting: Right-handed
- Bowling: Right-arm medium
- Source: Cricinfo, 13 August 2021

Noman Chowdhury (born 15 August 2001) is a Bangladeshi cricketer. He made his first-class debut on 10 October 2019, for Chittagong Division in the 2019–20 National Cricket League. In February 2021, he was selected in the Bangladesh Emerging squad for their home series against the Ireland Wolves. He made his Twenty20 debut on 7 June 2021, for Khelaghar Samaj Kallyan Samity against Abahani Limited in the 2021 Dhaka Premier Division Twenty20 Cricket League.
