= Anne-Marie McDonald =

Irish cricketer

Personal information
- Full name: Anne-Marie Frances McDonald
- Born: 26 April 1963 (age 63); Ireland
- Batting: Right-handed
- Bowling: Right-arm medium
- Relatives: Jonathan Garth (husband); Kim Garth (daughter); Jonathan Garth (son)

International information
- National side: Ireland (1988–1989)
- ODI debut (cap 13): 29 November 1988 v New Zealand
- Last ODI: 21 July 1989 v England

Career statistics
Competition	ODI
Matches	12
Runs scored	14
Batting average	4.66
100s/50s	0/0
Top score	4*
Balls bowled	606
Wickets	6
Bowling average	54.83
5 wickets in innings	0
10 wickets in match	0
Best bowling	2/18
Catches/stumpings	0/–
- Source: CricketArchive, 2 November 2015

Anne-Marie Frances Garth (née McDonald; born 26 April 1963) is a former Irish international cricketer who played for the Irish national team between 1988 and 1989. A right-handed medium-pace bowler, she played in twelve One Day International (ODI) matches, including at the 1988 World Cup.

A graduate of Dominican College Sion Hill, in County Dublin, McDonald made her international debut at the 1988 World Cup in Australia. She went on to play in all nine of her team's matches, but managed only two wickets overall, the least of any specialist Irish bowler. Her tournament bowling average of 115.50 was only surpassed by Chantal Grevers of the Netherlands, who had an average of 121.50. McDonald had greater success in her three other ODI appearances, all of which came at the 1989 European Championship in Denmark. She took 2/32 in the first match against Denmark, which she followed with a career-best 2/18 against the Netherlands. McDonald was 26 at the time of her last match, and finished her ODI career with a bowling average of 54.83.

== Personal life ==
McDonald married Jonathan Garth, a member of the Irish men's side. Their daughter, Kim Garth, has also represented Ireland in cricket. Their sons play club cricket.
