= Canadian cricket team in Ireland in 2008 =

	Canada	Ireland
- Dates: 12 August 2008 – 12 August 2008
Captains	Sanajayan Thuraisingam	Kyle McCallan

One Day International series
- Results: 1-match series drawn 0–0

The Canadian cricket team visited Ireland on 12 August 2008. The teams were scheduled to play one One-day International before the end of the tour on 12 August 2008 – the planned game was abandoned due to inclement weather without a ball being bowled.

== Event ==
=== Only ODI ===
12 August
(scorecard)

Canada	v	Ireland

Match abandoned without a ball bowled
Clontarf Cricket Club Ground, Dublin, Ireland
Umpires: EAR de Silva (SRI) & SS Prasad (SIN)
