= Ruhan Pretorius =

South African cricketer

Personal information
- Full name: Ruhan Pretorius
- Born: 2 March 1991 (age 35); East London, Cape Province, South Africa
- Batting: Right-handed
- Bowling: Right-arm fast-medium

Domestic team information
- Years: Team
- 2012/13–2018/19: KwaZulu-Natal Inland
- 2019–: Northern Knights
- FC debut: 4 October 2012 KZN Inland v Eastern Province
- LA debut: 7 October 2012 KZN Inland v Eastern Province

Career statistics
Competition	FC	LA	T20
Matches	62	77	64
Runs scored	2,610	1,974	984
Batting average	29.32	31.83	22.88
100s/50s	1/14	1/15	0/4
Top score	151	122*	58
Balls bowled	7,333	2,759	972
Wickets	157	74	48
Bowling average	23.66	29.60	26.33
5 wickets in innings	5	0	0
10 wickets in match	1	0	0
Best bowling	8/31	4/30	3/14
Catches/stumpings	37/–	26/–	26/–
- Source: Cricinfo, 15 July 2025

Ruhan Pretorius (born 2 March 1991) is a South African cricketer. Since 2015, he has played cricket in Ireland, and in 2019 moved to Northern Ireland. In November 2020, he was released by his club, North Down, due to financial reasons. Pretorius will become eligible for international selection through residency for the Ireland cricket team in 2022.

He was included in the KZN Inland squad for the 2016 Africa T20 Cup. He was the leading run-scorer in the 2017–18 CSA Provincial One-Day Challenge tournament for KwaZulu-Natal Inland, with 340 runs in ten matches. In September 2018, he was named in KwaZulu-Natal Inland's squad for the 2018 Africa T20 Cup.

In February 2021, Pretorius was added to the Ireland Wolves' squad for their tour to Bangladesh. However, during the first Unofficial ODI match of the tour, Pretorius tested positive for COVID-19, with the match being abandoned after 30 overs.
