= Wafadar Momand =

Afghan cricketer

Personal information
- Born: 5 October 1999 (age 27); Laghman, Afghanistan
- Batting: Right-handed
- Bowling: Right-arm medium
- Role: Bowler

International information
- National side: Afghanistan (2018–2024)
- Test debut (cap 10): 14 June 2018 v India
- Last Test: 15 March 2019 v Ireland
- T20I debut (cap 51): 16 July 2023 v Bangladesh
- Last T20I: 21 February 2024 v Sri Lanka

Domestic team information
- Years: Team
- Band-e-Amir Dragons

Career statistics
Competition	Test	T20I	FC	LA
Matches	2	2	11	27
Runs scored	12	–	53	30
Batting average	6.00	–	5.88	5.00
100s/50s	0/0	–/–	0/0	0/0
Top score	6*	–	14	15
Balls bowled	222	31	1,284	1,242
Wickets	2	0	20	28
Bowling average	77.50	–	35.15	43.50
5 wickets in innings	0	–	0	0
10 wickets in match	0	–	0	0
Best bowling	2/100	–	4/25	4/41
Catches/stumpings	0/–	0/–	2/–	2/–
- Source: Cricinfo, 19 July 2026

Wafadar Momand (Pashto: وفادار مومند) (born 5 October 1999) is an Afghan cricketer. He was one of the eleven cricketers to play in Afghanistan's first ever Test match, against India, in June 2018.

== Domestic career ==
He made his List A debut for Boost Region in the 2017 Ghazi Amanullah Khan Regional One Day Tournament on 11 August 2017. He made his Twenty20 debut for Band-e-Amir Dragons in the 2017 Shpageeza Cricket League on 15 September 2017.

== International career ==
In December 2017, he was named in Afghanistan's squad for the 2018 Under-19 Cricket World Cup.

In May 2018, he was named in Afghanistan's squad for their inaugural Test match, played against India. He made his Test debut against India, on 14 June 2018. During the match, he along with Rashid Khan, set an unflattering new record of being the first pair of teenagers to concede more than 100 runs each in their nation's inaugural Test match.

In July 2018, he was named in Afghanistan's One Day International (ODI) squad for their series against Ireland, but he did not play. In September 2018, he was named in Afghanistan's ODI squad for the 2018 Asia Cup. However, he was ruled out of the tournament after suffering an injury in a training session.

In December 2018, he was named in Afghanistan's under-23 team for the 2018 ACC Emerging Teams Asia Cup. In February 2019, he was named in Afghanistan's Test squad for their one-off match against Ireland in India. In November 2019, he was named in Afghanistan's squad for the 2019 ACC Emerging Teams Asia Cup in Bangladesh.

In July 2023, he was named in Afghanistan's Twenty20 International (T20I) squad for their series against Bangladesh. He made his T20I debut in the second match of the series, on 16 July 2023.
