= Jonathan Garth (cricketer, born 1965) =

Irish cricketer

Personal information
- Full name: Jonathan Digby Garth
- Born: 12 January 1965 (age 61); Johannesburg, Transvaal, South Africa
- Batting: Right-handed
- Bowling: Right-arm medium
- Relatives: Anne-Marie McDonald (wife); Kim Garth (daughter); Jonathan Garth (son)

International information
- National side: Ireland (1986–1989)

Career statistics
Competition	First-class	List A
Matches	3	4
Runs scored	34	33
Batting average	5.66	11.00
100s/50s	0/0	0/0
Top score	11	17
Balls bowled	192	227
Wickets	0	4
Bowling average	–	31.00
5 wickets in innings	–	0
10 wickets in match	–	0
Best bowling	–	3/28
Catches/stumpings	2/–	2/–
- Source: ESPNcricinfo, 25 September 2020

Jonathan Digby Garth (born 12 January 1965) is a former Irish cricketer who played for the Irish national side between 1986 and 1989. A right-handed batsman and right-arm medium pace bowler, he was born in Johannesburg, South Africa, but raised in Dublin, where he attended The High School. Overall, he played 26 times for Ireland, including three first-class matches and four List A matches.

== Playing career ==
A captain of Ireland youth teams, Garth made his debut for Ireland in May 1986, playing two matches against India. The following month, he played twice against Yorkshire and against Wales and Leicestershire in his List A debut. In July, he played against the MCC, scoring 64 in the Ireland second innings, his highest score (and only half-century) in all matches for Ireland. The following month, he made his first-class debut, playing against Scotland in Glasgow.

Garth continued in the Ireland team throughout 1987, 1988 and 1989, playing against Pakistan, Gloucestershire, Northamptonshire, Sussex, Scotland, the MCC, Worcestershire and Derbyshire, amongst others. Playing against Northamptonshire in a NatWest Trophy match in June 1987, he took 3/28, his best bowling figures for Ireland and in List A cricket. Garth played his last game for Ireland in August 1989 against Wales. In all matches for Ireland, he scored 392 runs at an average of 14.00, and took 24 wickets at an average of 43.46.

== Personal life ==
After retiring from cricket, Garth took up work in the insurance industry. He married Anne-Marie McDonald, who played for the Irish women's team in the late 1980s, including at ODI level. Their daughter, Kim Garth, has also played at international level, while their sons play club cricket.
