= David Delany =

Irish cricketer (born 1997)

Personal information
- Full name: David Colin Alex Delany
- Born: 28 December 1997 (age 28); Dublin, Ireland
- Batting: Left-handed
- Bowling: Right-arm fast
- Role: Bowler
- Relatives: GJ Delany (cousin); LK Delany (cousin)

International information
- National side: Ireland (2019)
- T20I debut (cap 47): 17 September 2019 v Scotland
- Last T20I: 25 October 2019 v Jersey

Domestic team information
- Years: Team
- 2017–2018: Munster Reds
- 2017–2018: Leinster Lightning
- 2018–2021: Northern Knights
- 2022–2023: Munster Reds
- 2024–2026: Leinster Lightning

Career statistics
Competition	T20I	FC	LA	T20
Matches	8	4	31	49
Runs scored	7	21	358	195
Batting average	3.50	7.00	25.57	13.92
100s/50s	0/0	0/0	0/1	0/0
Top score	7	17	76	25
Balls bowled	171	434	1,106	858
Wickets	8	11	29	41
Bowling average	27.75	26.27	38.79	28.85
5 wickets in innings	0	0	0	0
10 wickets in match	0	0	0	0
Best bowling	2/12	4/31	3/59	4/19
Catches/stumpings	0/–	0/–	3/–	10/–
- Source: Cricinfo, 1 August 2026

David Colin Alex Delany (born 28 December 1997) is an Irish cricketer. He made his Twenty20 cricket debut for Munster Reds in the 2017 Inter-Provincial Trophy on 16 June 2017. He made his first-class debut for Leinster Lightning in the 2017 Inter-Provincial Championship on 5 September 2017. He made his List A debut for Leinster Lightning in the 2017 Inter-Provincial Cup on 10 September 2017.

In August 2018, he was named in Ireland's squad for the limited overs series against Afghanistan, but he did not play. In September 2019, he was named in Ireland's Twenty20 International (T20I) squad for the 2019–20 Ireland Tri-Nation Series. He made his T20I debut for Ireland, against Scotland, on 17 September 2019. Later the same month, he was named in Ireland's squad for the 2019 ICC T20 World Cup Qualifier tournament in the United Arab Emirates, during which he bowled the fastest recorded ball by a cricketer for Ireland at 92 mph (148 km/h).

In December 2020, Delany was named in Ireland's One Day International (ODI) squad for their tour to the UAE to play the United Arab Emirates and Afghanistan. However, in January 2021, Delany was ruled out of the tour due to a knee injury. Since his knee injury, Delany has coached at Muir College in South Africa, and played in a local cricket league in Australia, as well as having a prolific career in Ireland too, having been awarded the Cricket Ireland club player of the year. His oldest brother, Eoghan, is a former youth international and subsequently also played for Leinster Lightning in 2015.
