= Jonathan Garth (cricketer, born 2000) =

Irish cricketer

Personal information
- Full name: Jonathan James Garth
- Born: 19 December 2000 (age 25)
- Batting: Right-handed
- Bowling: Right-arm leg break
- Relatives: Jonathan Garth (father); Anne-Marie McDonald (mother); Kim Garth (sister)

Domestic team information
- Years: Team
- 2019–2020: Munster Reds
- 2021: Leinster Lightning

Career statistics
Competition	FC	LA	T20
Matches	3	10	11
Runs scored	70	55	65
Batting average	17.50	13.75	13.00
100s/50s	0/0	0/0	0/0
Top score	45	19	26
Balls bowled	390	354	132
Wickets	7	3	4
Bowling average	39.85	129.00	44.00
5 wickets in innings	0	0	0
10 wickets in match	0	0	0
Best bowling	3/140	1/14	1/5
Catches/stumpings	1/–	3/–	4/–
- Source: Cricinfo, 4 May 2021

Jonathan James Garth (born 19 December 2000) is an Irish cricketer. Garth comes from a cricketing family, with his father Jonathan, mother Anne-Marie McDonald, and his sister Kim all representing Ireland at an international level.

He made his List A debut for Ireland A against Bangladesh A on 1 August 2018. Prior to his List A debut, he was named in Ireland's squad for the 2018 Under-19 Cricket World Cup. He made his first-class cricket debut for Ireland A against Sri Lanka A on 5 January 2019. He made his Twenty20 debut for Munster Reds in the 2019 Inter-Provincial Trophy on 22 June 2019.

On 10 July 2020, Garth was named in Ireland's 21-man squad to travel to England to start training behind closed doors for the One Day International (ODI) series against the England cricket team. Following his inclusion in the training squad, Garth said he was "surprised but delighted" to be named in the team.

In February 2021, Garth was named in the Ireland Wolves' squad for their tour to Bangladesh. Later the same month, Garth was part of the intake for the Cricket Ireland Academy.
