= Peter Chase =

Irish cricketer (born 1993)

Personal information
- Full name: Peter Karl David Chase
- Born: 9 October 1993 (age 33); Dublin, Ireland
- Batting: Right-handed
- Bowling: Right-arm medium-fast
- Role: Bowler

International information
- National side: Ireland (2015–2019)
- ODI debut (cap 48): 19 January 2015 v Scotland
- Last ODI: 31 August 2018 v Afghanistan
- ODI shirt no.: 28
- T20I debut (cap 43): 16 June 2018 v Scotland
- Last T20I: 24 February 2019 v Afghanistan

Domestic team information
- Years: Team
- 2013–2021: Leinster Lightning
- 2014–2015: Durham

Career statistics
Competition	ODI	T20I	FC	LA
Matches	25	12	19	69
Runs scored	35	7	117	144
Batting average	3.50	7.00	13.00	7.20
100s/50s	0/0	0/0	0/0	0/0
Top score	14	4	24	28*
Balls bowled	1,238	251	2,306	3,072
Wickets	34	15	49	91
Bowling average	39.88	27.73	30.30	34.26
5 wickets in innings	0	0	2	1
10 wickets in match	0	0	0	0
Best bowling	3/33	4/35	5/24	5/42
Catches/stumpings	5/–	5/–	6/–	14/–
- Source: Cricinfo, 30 May 2021

Peter Karl David Chase (born 9 October 1993) is an Irish cricketer who played for Durham County Cricket Club. He is a right-arm medium-fast bowler who also bats right handed. In December 2018, he was one of nineteen players to be awarded a central contract by Cricket Ireland for the 2019 season. In June 2022, Chase retired from international cricket.

== Early and personal life ==
Chase played his youth cricket at Malahide Cricket Club, where he was named Youth Player of the Year in 2011 and was playing for the senior team in 2013.

== Domestic career ==
He made his first-class debut for the county in August 2014 against Nottinghamshire. Chase was named Shapoorji Pallonji Cricket Ireland Academy Player of the Year in 2014.

He made his Twenty20 cricket debut for Leinster Lightning in the 2017 Inter-Provincial Trophy on 26 May 2017. He was the leading wicket-taker for Leinster Lightning in the 2018 Inter-Provincial Championship, with thirteen dismissals in four matches.

== International career ==
He made his One Day International (ODI) debut for Ireland against Scotland in the Dubai Triangular Series in the United Arab Emirates on 19 January 2015, although the match was abandoned after the toss was made. In June 2016, he was named in Ireland's ODI squad for their series against Afghanistan, scheduled to take place the following month. In February 2017 he was added to Ireland's Twenty20 International (T20I) squad for their series against Afghanistan in India.

He made his Twenty20 International (T20I) debut for Ireland against Scotland on 16 June 2018. A month later, he bowled the best death over in t20i history when he dismissed both MS Dhoni and Virat Kohli in Malahide. In June 2019, he was named in the Ireland Wolves squad for their home series against the Scotland A cricket team. On 10 July 2020, Chase was named in Ireland's 21-man squad to travel to England to start training behind closed doors for the ODI series against the England cricket team.

In February 2021, Chase was named in the Ireland Wolves' squad for their tour to Bangladesh.

On 9 June 2022, Chase announced his retirement from international cricket after an eight-year career and winning 43 caps for Ireland. He continues to play for Marylebone Cricket Club in Ireland.
