= Ireland Wolves cricket team =

Second-tier Irish national cricket team

Personnel
- Captain: Neil Rock
- Coach: Ryan Eagleson

Team information
- Founded: 2017
- Home ground: Malahide Cricket Club Ground, Dublin, Ireland
- Capacity: 10,000

History
- First-class debut: v. Bangladesh A at Sylhet International Cricket Stadium, Sylhet; 11–14 October 2017
- List A debut: v. United Arab Emirates at Sheikh Zayed Cricket Stadium, Abu Dhabi; 22 April 2006
- Twenty20 debut: v. Bangladesh A at Castle Avenue cricket ground, Dublin; 13 August 2018
- As of 18 September 2024

The Ireland Wolves (formally Ireland A) is a national cricket team representing Ireland. It is the second tier of international Irish cricket, below the full Ireland national cricket team. Matches played by Ireland Wolves are not considered to be One-Day Internationals, instead receiving first-class and List A classification.

The team was originally linked to The Cricket Ireland Academy, allowing for fixtures to take place, prioritising Academy players. The name gave flexibility between The Wolves and The A Team. The first fixtures and tour by the Ireland Wolves was to Bath in April 2017 where they competed in a pre-season T20 Festival with Gloucestershire County Cricket Club, winning 4 of their 5 games and the tournament as a whole.

Peter Johnston was the official Head Coach of Ireland Wolves, since 2022 it has been Coached by Senior Team Support Staff on a rotational basis.

The Ireland Wolves first away series against a Full Member was against the Bangladesh A cricket team, when they toured Bangladesh to play one first-class match at the Sylhet International Cricket Stadium, Sylhet, and five List A matches at Sheikh Kamal International Cricket Stadium Academy Ground, Cox's Bazar. Bangladesh A won the first-class match and four of the List A matches, and the other was washed out.

In August 2018, the Bangladesh A cricket team made a tour to Ireland where they played a series of List A and Twenty20 matches against the Ireland Wolves. The List A series was tied 2-2, while Bangladesh A won the T20 series 2–1.

In January 2019, the Ireland Wolves travelled to Sri Lanka to play two first class matches and five List A matches. The Sri Lanka A cricket team won the 1st unofficial test by 10 wickets, while the 2nd unofficial test ended in a high scoring draw. The unofficial ODI series that followed was won 5–0 by Sri Lanka A.

In May 2019 the Ireland Wolves an historic win, defeating the Bangladesh senior team in a List A fixture played at The Hills Cricket Club. The Ireland Wolves won the game by 88 runs. In June of the same year they then went on to defeat Zimbabwe's senior team by 27 runs in a List A game, giving them back to back historic wins against Full Member senior team opposition.

In January 2020, Cricket Ireland confirmed that the team would tour South Africa to play seven matches against the Namibia cricket team. They would go onto win the T20 series 4-1, giving them a series win over a strong associate senior team, the series was Curtis Campher's first introduction into Irish Cricket.

In February 2021, the Wolves toured Bangladesh for a multi-format series against Bangladesh Emerging Team which was interrupted by covid. They were defeated 4-0 in List A 50 Over series and 1-0 in the T20 Series.

In March–April 2022, the Wolves toured Namibia for three T20 and five List A 50 over games. Ireland lost the T20 series to Namibia A 1-0 and drew the 50 Over series 2-2 with Namibia A. In March 2024, the Wolves toured Nepal for two T20 with Nepal senior sides three T20 and three List A 50 over games with Nepal A sides. Coached by Ryan Eagleson they lost the first two games with Nepal senior side, but went on to win both the T20 and 50 Over series with Nepal A team 2-1 and 3-0 respectively.

== Playing squads ==
International cap players are marked in Bold.

Name	Age	Batting style	Bowling style	Domestic team	Forms	S/N	C/G
Batsmen
Christopher De Freitas	24	Left-handed	Right-arm medium	Leinster Lightning	FC, List A		—
**Ross Adair**	32	Right-handed	Slow left-arm orthodox	Northern Knights	List A, T20	15	F/T
Cade Carmichael	23	Right-handed	Right-arm medium	Northern Knights	FC, List A		—
Morgan Topping	27	Right-handed	Right-arm off-break	Northern Knights	FC, List A, T20	29	—
All-rounders
Jordan Neill	20	Right-handed	Right-arm medium-fast	Munster Reds	FC, List A	39	—
Scott Macbeth	21	Right-handed	Right-arm off-break	North West Warriors	FC, List A		—
Wicket-keepers
**Stephen Doheny**	27	Right-handed	—	North West Warriors	FC, List A, T20	20	F/T
Sam Topping	21	Right-handed	—	Northern Knights	FC, List A		—
Benjamin Calitz	24	Left-handed	—	Northern Knights	FC, List A		—
Spin bowlers
Cian Robertson	23	Right-handed	Right-arm leg-break	Slow left arm orthodox	FC, List A		—
**Gavin Hoey**	24	Right-handed	Right-arm leg-break	Leinster Lightning	FC, List A, T20	59	R
Pace bowlers
Liam McCarthy	24	Left-handed	Right-arm fast-medium	Munster Reds	FC, List A, T20	34	R
Thomas Mayes	25	Right-handed	Right-arm fast-medium	Northern Knights	FC, List A, T20	22	R
**Fionn Hand**	28	Right-handed	Right-arm medium	Leinster Lightning	FC, List A, T20	71	F/T
Matthew Foster	26	Left-handed	Right-arm medium-fast	Northern Knights	FC, List A, T20	52	F/T

== Coaching staff ==
Position	Name
Head coach	(Northern Ireland) Gary Wilson
Assistant coach	(England) Chris Brown
Physiotherapist	(Wales) Mark Rausa
Strength & Conditioning	(Northern Ireland) Stuart Thompson
Performance Analyst	(Northern Ireland) Scott Irvine
Team Manager	(England) Chris Siddell
