= Antigua and Barbuda at the 2014 Commonwealth Games =

- CGF code: ANT
- CGA: Antigua and Barbuda National Olympic Committee
- Website: antiguabarbudanoc.com

in Glasgow, Scotland
- Competitors: 20 in 5 sports
- Flag bearer: Daniel Bailey
- Medals: Gold 0 Silver 0 Bronze 0 Total 0

Commonwealth Games appearances (overview)
- 1966; 1970; 1974; 1978; 1982–1990; 1994; 1998; 2002; 2006; 2010; 2014; 2018; 2022; 2026; 2030

Antigua and Barbuda competed in the 2014 Commonwealth Games in Glasgow, Scotland from 23 July to 3 August 2014.

== Aquatics ==
=== Swimming ===
Men

Athlete	Event	Round 1		Semifinal		Final	
Athlete	Event	Result	Rank	Result	Rank	Result	Rank
J'air Smith	100 m freestyle	57.08	47	did not advance			
J'air Smith	50 m breaststroke	33.62	33	did not advance			

Women

Athlete	Event	Round 1		Semifinal		Final	
Athlete	Event	Result	Rank	Result	Rank	Result	Rank
Rachel Wall	50 m freestyle	29.35	50	did not advance			
Rachel Wall	100 m freestyle	1:05.49	39	did not advance			

== Athletics ==
Men

Athlete	Event	Heat		Semifinal		Final	
Athlete	Event	Result	Rank	Result	Rank	Result	Rank
Chavaughn Walsh	100 m	10.88	51	did not advance			
Tahir Walsh	100 m	DSQ		did not advance			
Daniel Bailey	100 m	10.30	7 Q	10.22	12	did not advance	
Daniel Bailey	200 m	20.74	12 Q	20.49	5 q	20.43	6
Kasheem Colbourne	200 m	21.92	55	did not advance			
Daniel Bailey; Kasheem Colbourne; Miguel Francis; Cejhae Greene; Chavaughn Walsh; Tahir Walsh	4 x 100 m relay	39.48	8 q	—		40.45	7

Women

Track and road events

Athlete	Event	Round 1		Semifinal		Final	
Athlete	Event	Result	Rank	Result	Rank	Result	Rank
Afia Charles	400 m	DSQ		did not advance			
Samantha Edwards	400 m	55.47	32	did not advance			

Field events

Athlete	Event	Qualifying		Final	
Athlete	Event	Result	Rank	Result	Rank
Priscilla Frederick	High jump	1.81	13	did not advance	
Amy Harris	Long jump	No Mark		did not advance	

== Boxing ==
Men

Athlete	Event	Round of 32	Round of 16	Quarterfinals	Semifinals	Final	
Athlete	Event	Opposition Result	Opposition Result	Opposition Result	Opposition Result	Opposition Result	Rank
Yakita Aska	Light heavyweight	Bye	Kozaala (UGA); W 3 - 0	Thorley (WAL); L KO1	did not advance		
Damian Davidson	Welterweight	Finau (TON); L 0 - 3	did not advance				

== Cycling ==
=== Road ===
Men

Athlete	Event	Time	Rank
Jyme Bridges	Road race	DNF	
Jyme Bridges	Time trial	1:01:15.52	47
Andre Simon	Road race	DNF	
Andre Simon	Time trial	58:49.06	34
Marvin Spencer	Road race	DNF	
Marvin Spencer	Time trial	1:01:30.09	49

Women

Athlete	Event	Time	Rank
Tamiko Butler	Road race	2:51:00	24
Tamiko Butler	Time trial	47:17.99	18

=== Track ===
Points Race

Athlete	Event	Laps	Points	Rank
Jyme Brudges	Men's points race	-3	-60	15
Tamiko Butler	Women's points race	did not finish		

Pursuit

Athlete	Event	Qualification		Final	
Athlete	Event	Time	Rank	Opponent results	Rank
Tamiko Butler	Women's individual pursuit	4:08.979	18	did not advance	

Scratch

Athlete	Event	Qualification		Final	
Athlete	Event	Time	Rank	Time	Rank
Jyme Brudges	Men's scratch	did not finish		did not advance	
Tamiko Butler	Women's scratch	—		did not finish	

== Shooting ==
=== Full bore rifle ===
Open

Athlete	Event	Day 1		Day 2		Day 3		Total	
Athlete	Event	Points	Rank	Points	Rank	Points	Rank	Overall	Rank
Thomas Greenaway	Queen's prize individual	93		136		111		340	34
Anderson Perry	Queen's prize individual	99		141		122		362	29
Thomas Greenaway; Anderson Perry	Queen's prize pairs	268	17	189	17	—		457	17

== Swimming ==
Men

Athlete	Event	Heat		Semifinal		Final	
Athlete	Event	Time	Rank	Time	Rank	Time	Rank
J'air Smith	100 m freestyle	57.08	47	did not advance			
J'air Smith	50 m breaststroke	33.62	33	did not advance			

Women

Athlete	Event	Heat		Semifinal		Final	
Athlete	Event	Time	Rank	Time	Rank	Time	Rank
Rachel Wall	50 m freestyle	29.35	50	did not advance			
Rachel Wall	100 m freestyle	1:05.49	39	did not advance			
