= Antigua and Barbuda at the 2018 Commonwealth Games =

- Flag of Antigua and Barbuda
- CG code: ANT
- CGA: Antigua and Barbuda National Olympic Committee
- Website: antiguabarbudanoc.com

in Gold Coast, Australia 4 April 2018 – 15 April 2018
- Competitors: 17 in 5 sports
- Medals: Gold 0 Silver 0 Bronze 0 Total 0

Commonwealth Games appearances (overview)
- 1966; 1970; 1974; 1978; 1982–1990; 1994; 1998; 2002; 2006; 2010; 2014; 2018; 2022; 2026; 2030

Antigua and Barbuda competed at the 2018 Commonwealth Games in the Gold Coast, Australia from 4 to 15 April 2018. It was Antigua and Barbua's 10th appearance at the Commonwealth Games.

== Competitors ==
The following is the list of number of competitors that participated at the Games per sport/discipline.

Sport	Men	Women	Total
Athletics	5	2	7
Boxing	2	0	2
Cycling	2	0	3
Shooting	2	0	2
Swimming	2	2	4
Total	13	4	17

== Athletics ==
Antigua and Barbuda participated with 7 athletes (5 men and 2 women).

Men
Track & road events

Athlete	Event	Heat		Semifinal		Final	
Athlete	Event	Result	Rank	Result	Rank	Result	Rank
Cejhae Greene	100 m	10.36	1 Q	10.39	6	did not advance	
Jared Jarvis	200 m	21.21	3	did not advance			
Tahir Walsh	200 m	21.10	3 q	21.13	8	did not advance	
Coull Graham; Cejhae Greene; Jared Jarvis; Chavaughn Walsh; Tahir Walsh	4 × 100 m relay	DNS		—N/a		did not advance	

Women
Field events

Athlete	Event	Qualification		Final	
Athlete	Event	Distance	Position	Distance	Position
Priscilla Frederick	High jump	—N/a		1.87	5
Jess St. John	Shot put	16.90	6 Q	17.32	7

== Boxing ==
Antigua and Barbuda participated with 2 athletes (2 men).

Men

Athlete	Event	Round of 32	Round of 16	Quarterfinals	Semifinals	Final	Rank
Athlete	Event	Opposition Result	Opposition Result	Opposition Result	Opposition Result	Opposition Result	Rank
Alston Ryan	−64 kg	William Edwards (WAL); L 0-5	did not advance				
Yakita Aska	−91 kg	—N/a	David Nyika (NZL); L 0-5	did not advance			

== Cycling ==
Antigua and Barbuda participated with 2 athletes (2 men).

=== Road ===
Men

Athlete	Event	Time	Rank
Jyme Bridges	Road race	DNF	
Jyme Bridges	Time trial	59:08.46	42
Jeffrey Kelsick	Road race	DNF	
Jeffrey Kelsick	Time trial	1:01:10.11	46

== Shooting ==
Antigua and Barbuda participated with 2 athletes (2 men).

Open

Athlete	Event	Day 1		Day 2		Day 3		Total	
Athlete	Event	Points	Rank	Points	Rank	Points	Rank	Overall	Rank
Edworth Benjamin	Queen's prize individual	85-4v	33	128-4v	33	141-12v	26	354-20v	31
Desroy Maile	Queen's prize individual	92-3v	32	130-5v	32	126-1v	32	348-9v	33
Edworth Benjamin; Desroy Maile	Queen's prize pairs	266-11v	16	245-12v	15	—N/a		511-23v	15

== Swimming ==
Antigua and Barbuda participated with 4 athletes (2 men and 2 women).

Men

Athlete	Event	Heat		Semifinal		Final	
Athlete	Event	Time	Rank	Time	Rank	Time	Rank
Stefano Mitchell	50 m freestyle	24.14	33	did not advance			
Stefano Mitchell	100 m freestyle	54.95	46	did not advance			
Stefano Mitchell	200 m freestyle	2:00.46	28	—N/a		did not advance	
Stefano Mitchell	50 m butterfly	26.43	37	did not advance			
Stefano Mitchell	100 m butterfly	58.88	23	did not advance			
Stefano Mitchell	200 m individual medley	2:18.59	22	—N/a		did not advance	
Jadon Wuilliez	50 m freestyle	25.15	48	did not advance			
Jadon Wuilliez	100 m freestyle	55.21	47	did not advance			
Jadon Wuilliez	50 m breaststroke	31.38	29	did not advance			
Jadon Wuilliez	100 m breaststroke	1:09.17	25	did not advance			
Jadon Wuilliez	200 m breaststroke	2:39.88	16	—N/a		did not advance	
Jadon Wuilliez	50 m butterfly	27.78	46	did not advance			
Jadon Wuilliez	200 m individual medley	2:19.95	23	—N/a		did not advance	

Women

Athlete	Event	Heat		Semifinal		Final	
Athlete	Event	Time	Rank	Time	Rank	Time	Rank
Makaela Holowchak	50 m freestyle	28.65	30	did not advance			
Makaela Holowchak	100 m freestyle	1:01.61	29	did not advance			
Makaela Holowchak	200 m freestyle	2:14.01	19	—N/a		did not advance	
Makaela Holowchak	400 m freestyle	4:41.90	18	—N/a		did not advance	
Aliah Maginley	50 m freestyle	31.20	38	did not advance			
Aliah Maginley	100 m freestyle	1:06.20	34	did not advance			
Aliah Maginley	200 m freestyle	2:25.35	21	—N/a		did not advance	
Aliah Maginley	400 m freestyle	5:09.66	21	—N/a		did not advance	
Aliah Maginley	100 m breaststroke	1:26.15	26	did not advance			
Aliah Maginley	200 m breaststroke	DNS		—N/a		did not advance	

== See also ==
- Antigua and Barbuda at the 2018 Summer Youth Olympics
