= Antigua and Barbuda at the 2015 World Championships in Athletics =

- WA code: ANT

in Beijing
- Competitors: 5
- Medals: Gold 0 Silver 0 Bronze 0 Total 0

World Championships in Athletics appearances
- 1983; 1987; 1991; 1993; 1995; 1997; 1999; 2001; 2003; 2005; 2007; 2009; 2011; 2013; 2015; 2017; 2019; 2022; 2023; 2025

Antigua and Barbuda competed at the 2015 World Championships in Athletics in Beijing, China, from 22 to 30 August 2015.

== Results ==
=== Men ===
Track and road events

Athlete	Event	Heat		Semifinal		Final	
Athlete	Event	Result	Rank	Result	Rank	Result	Rank
Miguel Francis	200 metres	20.38	23 Q	20.14	7	did not advance	
Daniel Bailey; Miguel Francis; Jared Jarvis; Chavaughn Walsh	4 × 100 metres relay	38.01 NR	5 q	—N/a		38.61	6

=== Women ===
Field events

Athlete	Event	Qualification		Final	
Athlete	Event	Result	Position	Result	Position
Priscilla Frederick	High jump	1.85	22	did not advance	
