= Antigua and Barbuda at the 1998 Commonwealth Games =

- Flag of Antigua and Barbuda
- CG code: ANT
- CGA: Antigua and Barbuda National Olympic Committee
- Website: antiguabarbudanoc.com

in Kuala Lumpur, Malaysia 11 September 1998 – 21 September 1998
- Medals: Gold 0 Silver 0 Bronze 0 Total 0

Commonwealth Games appearances (overview)
- 1966; 1970; 1974; 1978; 1982–1990; 1994; 1998; 2002; 2006; 2010; 2014; 2018; 2022; 2026; 2030

Antigua and Barbuda competed at the 1998 Commonwealth Games in Kuala Lumpur, Malaysia from 11 to 21 September 1998. It was Antigua and Barbuda's 5th appearance at the Commonwealth Games.

== Athletics ==
Key

- Note–Ranks given for track events are within the athlete's heat only
- Q = Qualified for the next round
- q = Qualified for the next round as a fastest loser or, in field events, by position without achieving the qualifying target
- NR = National record
- N/A = Round not applicable for the event

Track & road events

Athlete	Event	Heat		Quarterfinal		Semifinal		Final	
Athlete	Event	Time	Rank	Time	Rank	Time	Rank	Time	Rank
N'Kosie Barnes	Men's 200 metres	DNS		did not advance					
N'Kosie Barnes	Men's 400 metres	50.15	7	did not advance					
Dale Jones	Men's 1500 metres	DNS		—N/a				did not advance	
Heather Samuel	Women's 100 m	11.53	4 q	—N/a		11.69	8	did not advance	
Heather Samuel	Women's 200 m	24.56	5	—N/a		did not advance			
Sonia Williams	Women's 100 m	11.69	4 q	—N/a		11.82	9	did not advance	
Sonia Williams	Women's 200 m	DNS		—N/a		did not advance			

== Cricket ==
Antigua and Barbuda named the below squad for the tournament.

Roster

- Dave Joseph (c)
- Curtly Ambrose
- Hamish Anthony
- Eldine Baptiste
- Kenny Benjamin
- Winston Benjamin
- Wilden Cornwall
- Ridley Jacobs (wk)
- Sylvester Joseph
- Anthony Lake
- Richie Richardson
- Ian Tittle
- Earl Waldron
- Hayden Walsh

Summary

Team	Event	Group stage				Semifinal	Final / BM	
Team	Event	Opposition Result	Opposition Result	Opposition Result	Rank	Opposition Result	Opposition Result	Rank
Antigua and Barbuda men	Men's tournament	India; No result	Australia; L by 7 wickets	Canada; W by 121 runs	2	did not advance		8

Group stage

Group B
Pos	Team	Pld	W	L	T	NR	Pts	NRR
1	Australia	3	3	0	0	0	6	3.299
2	Antigua and Barbuda	3	1	1	0	1	3	0.079
3	India	3	1	1	0	1	3	−0.340
4	Canada	3	0	3	0	0	0	−2.558

Source: ESPNcricinfo

9 September 1998
10:00
Scorecard

Antigua and Barbuda; 164/9 (41 overs)	v	India; 30/2 (9.4 overs)
Ridley Jacobs 43* (70); Anil Kumble 3/28 (8 overs)		Sachin Tendulkar 15 (10); Eldine Baptiste 1/4 (1 over)

No result
Tenaga National Sports Complex, Kuala Lumpur
Umpires: Javed Akhtar (Pak) and K. T. Francis (SL)

- Antigua and Barbuda won the toss and elected to bat.
- The match was reduced before play started to 41 overs per side due to overnight rain. Rain prevented any further play after 9.4 overs were bowled in the second innings.
- Wilden Cornwall and Ian Tittle (Ant) both made their List A debut.
- Robin Singh (Ind) took his 100th List A wicket.
- Points: Antigua and Barbuda 1, India 1.

12 September 1998
10:00
Scorecard

Antigua and Barbuda; 99 (30.1 overs)	v	Australia; 101/3 (18 overs)
Eldine Baptiste 22; Damien Fleming 5/24 (9 overs)		Adam Gilchrist 43*; Curtly Ambrose 2/29 (7 overs)

Australia won by 7 wickets
Tenaga National Sports Complex, Kuala Lumpur
Umpires: Rudi Koertzen (SA) and Saleem Badar (Pak)

- Australia won the toss and elected to field.
- Damien Fleming (Aus) took his second and final List A five-wicket haul.
- Points: Australia 2, Antigua and Barbuda 0.
- Antigua and Barbuda were eliminated as a result of this match.

14 September 1998
10:00
Scorecard

Antigua and Barbuda; 256/7 (50 overs)	v	Canada; 135 (31.3 overs)
Anthony Lake 54; Ingleton Liburd 1/41 (7 overs)		Joseph Harris 48; Anthony Lake 4/17 (4.3 overs)

Antigua and Barbuda won by 121 runs
Royal Selangor Club, Kuala Lumpur
Umpires: K. T. Francis (SL) and Syed Mahabubullah (Ban)

- Antigua and Barbuda won the toss and elected to bat.
- Anthony Lake (Ant) made his List A debut.
- Nigel Isaacs (Can) played his only List A match.
- Hayden Walsh Sr., Richie Richardson, Winston Benjamin (Ant) and Anand Varadarajan, Ingleton Liburd, Derick Etwaroo, Danny Ramnarais (Can) all played their final List A match.
- Kenny Benjamin (Ant) took his 100th List A wicket.
- Points: Antigua and Barbuda 2, Canada 0.
