= Antigua and Barbuda at the 2017 World Championships in Athletics =

- Flag of Antigua and Barbuda
- WA code: ANT
- National federation: Antigua & Barbuda Athletic Association

in London, United Kingdom 4–13 August 2017
- Competitors: 2 (2 men and 0 women) in 1 event
- Medals: Gold 0 Silver 0 Bronze 0 Total 0

World Championships in Athletics appearances
- 1983; 1987; 1991; 1993; 1995; 1997; 1999; 2001; 2003; 2005; 2007; 2009; 2011; 2013; 2015; 2017; 2019; 2022; 2023; 2025

Antigua and Barbuda competed at the 2017 World Championships in Athletics in London, United Kingdom, 4–13 August 2017. The Caribbean nation was represented by five male athletes due to compete in three events.

Cejhae Greene advanced through the semifinals of the 100 metres but he sustained an injury and failed to advance to the final. Chavaughn Walsh contested the preliminary rounds of the same event and was one of the 14 athletes to advance to the heats stage. However, he also sustained an injury and was forced to withdraw. A third athlete, Richard Richardson, sustained a wound on his shin and had to get five or six stitches. As a result of these injuries, head coach Carl Casey announced that the team would not be starting in the 4 × 100 metres relay.

== Results ==
=== Men ===
Track and road events

Athlete	Event	Preliminaries		Heat		Semifinal		Final	
Athlete	Event	Result	Rank	Result	Rank	Result	Rank	Result	Rank
Cejhae Greene	100 metres	—N/a		10.21	19 Q	10.64	24	Did not advance	
Chavaughn Walsh	100 metres	10.44	11 Q	DNS	–	Did not advance			
	4 × 100 metres relay	—N/a		DNS	–	—N/a		Did not advance	
