= Miss Caribbean UK 2016 =

Miss Caribbean UK 2016, the 3rd edition of the Miss Caribbean UK pageant, was held on 3 December 2016 at the Broadway Theatre in Catford London, UK. Amy Harris-Willock crowned her successor, the model, Jodie Hodgson, who was representing Barbados. Thirteen contestants competed for the crown.
