= Hayden Walsh =

Hayden Walsh may refer to:

- Hayden Walsh, Sr. (1963–2010), Antiguan cricketer
- Hayden Walsh, Jr. (born 1992), Antiguan cricketer
