= Miss Caribbean UK 2015 =

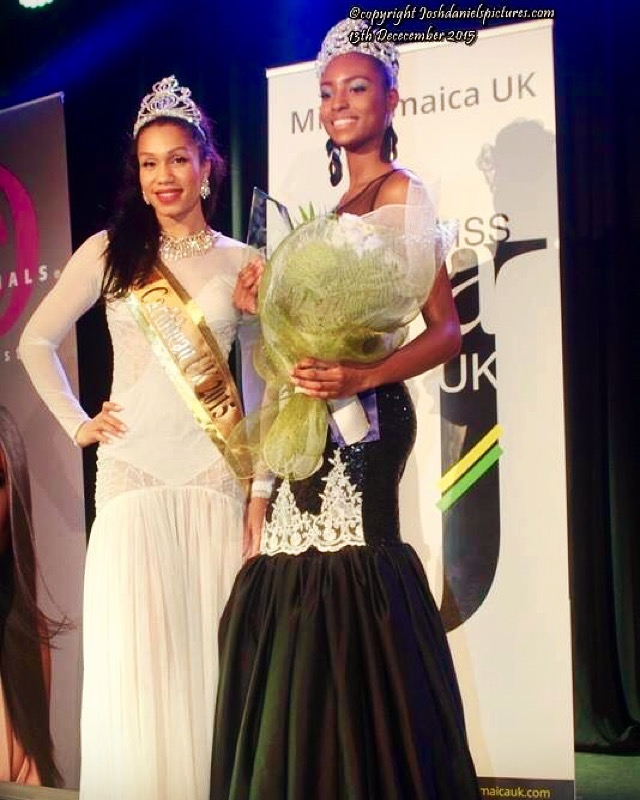
- Miss Caribbean UK 2015 Amy Harris-Willock at Jasmine May's crowning as Miss Jamaica UK 2015
- Date: 5 December 2015
- Presenters: W-Livingston Gilchrist
- Entertainment: Keneva; Myself UK Dance Company; Daijow; Record Heads; Phase 5 Steelband
- Venue: Shaw Theatre, London
- Entrants: 16
- Placements: 7
- Winner: Amy Harris-Willock (Antigua and Barbuda)

Miss Caribbean UK 2015, the 2nd edition of the Miss Caribbean UK pageant, was held on 5 December 2015 at the Shaw Theatre in London, UK. Keeleigh Griffith crowned her successor, the Commonwealth long jump athlete Amy Harris-Willock, who was representing Antigua and Barbuda. Sixteen contestants competed for the crown.
