= Antigua and Barbuda at the 2022 Commonwealth Games =

- Flag of Antigua and Barbuda
- CGF code: ANT
- CGA: Antigua and Barbuda National Olympic Committee
- Website: antiguabarbudanoc.com

in Birmingham, England 28 July 2022 – 8 August 2022
- Competitors: 12 (10 men and 2 women) in 4 sports
- Medals: Gold 0 Silver 0 Bronze 0 Total 0

Commonwealth Games appearances (overview)
- 1966; 1970; 1974; 1978; 1982–1990; 1994; 1998; 2002; 2006; 2010; 2014; 2018; 2022; 2026; 2030

Antigua and Barbuda competed at the 2022 Commonwealth Games held in Birmingham, England. This was Antigua and Barbuda's 11th appearance at the Commonwealth Games.

Antigua and Barbuda's team consisted of 13 athletes (ten men and three women) competing in four sports.

== Competitors ==
The following is the list of number of competitors participating at the Games per sport/discipline.

Sport	Men	Women	Total
Athletics	4	1	5
Boxing	1	0	1
Cycling	2	0	2
Swimming	3	1	4
Total	10	2	12

== Athletics ==
Men
Track and road events

Athlete	Event	Heat		Semifinal		Final	
Athlete	Event	Result	Rank	Result	Rank	Result	Rank
Cejhae Greene	100 m	10.16	3 q	10.45	8	did not advance	
Darion Skerritt	200 m	21.24	4 q	21.41	7	did not advance	
Kalique St. Jean	800 m	1:56.48	7	Did not advance			
Kalique St. Jean	1500 m	DNS		—N/a		Did not advance	

Field events

Athlete	Event	Final	
Athlete	Event	Distance	Rank
Taeco O'Garro	Triple jump	15.68	11

Women
Track and road events

Athlete	Event	Heat		Semifinal		Final	
Athlete	Event	Result	Rank	Result	Rank	Result	Rank
Joella Lloyd	100 m	11.42	3 Q	11.49	5	did not advance	
Joella Lloyd	200 m	DNS		Did not advance			

== Boxing ==
Athlete	Event	Round of 32	Round of 16	Quarterfinals	Semifinals	Final	
Athlete	Event	Opposition Result	Opposition Result	Opposition Result	Opposition Result	Opposition Result	Rank
Alston Ryan	Men's Light welterweight	Isendi (TAN); W 5–0	Browne (SLE); W 5–0	Omar (GHA); L 1–4	Did not advance		

== Cycling ==
Two male road cyclists were selected to the team.

=== Road ===
Men

Athlete	Event	Time	Rank
Jyme Bridges	Road race	DNF	
Conor Delanbanque	Time trial	DNS	

=== Track ===
Points race

Athlete	Event	Final	
Athlete	Event	Points	Rank
Jyme Bridges	Men's point race	DNF	

Scratch race

Athlete	Event	Qualification	Final
Jyme Bridges	Men's scratch race	DNF	Did not advance

== Swimming ==
Men

Athlete	Event	Heat		Semifinal		Final	
Athlete	Event	Time	Rank	Time	Rank	Time	Rank
Stefano Mitchell	50 m freestyle	23.29	18	Did not advance			
Stefano Mitchell	100 m freestyle	51.42	27	did not advance			
Jadon Wuilliez	50 m breaststroke	28.44	16 Q	28.19	13	Did not advance	
Jadon Wuilliez	100 m breaststroke	1:02.38	15 Q	1:02.23	14	did not advance	
Ethan Stubbs-Green	100 m butterfly	57.99	39	Did not advance			
Ethan Stubbs-Green	200 m butterfly	2:10.25	17	—N/a		did not advance	

Women

Athlete	Event	Heat		Semifinal		Final	
Athlete	Event	Time	Rank	Time	Rank	Time	Rank
Olivia Fuller	50 m freestyle	27.76	35	did not advance			
Olivia Fuller	100 m freestyle	1:00.56	33	Did not advance			
