= International cricket in 1998–99 =

Cricket season

The 1998–1999 international cricket season was from September 1998 to April 1999.

== Season overview ==
International tours
Start date	Home team	Away team	Results [Matches]			
Start date	Home team	Away team	Test	ODI	FC	LA
26 September 1998	Zimbabwe	India	1–0 [1]	1–2 [3]	—	—
1 October 1998	Pakistan	Australia	0–1 [3]	0–3 [3]	—	—
20 November 1998	Australia	England	3–1 [5]	—	—	—
20 November 1998	Pakistan	Zimbabwe	0–1 [3]	2–1 [3]	—	—
26 November 1998	South Africa	West Indies	4–0 [5]	6–1 [7]	—	—
18 December 1998	New Zealand	India	1–0 [3]	2–2 [5]	—	—
29 January 1999	India	Pakistan	1–1 [2]	—	—	—
14 February 1999	New Zealand	South Africa	0–1 [3]	2–3 [6]	—	—
5 March 1999	West Indies	Australia	2–2 [4]	3–3 [7]	—	—
16 March 1999	Bangladesh	Pakistan	—	0–1 [1]	—	—
International tournaments
Start date	Tournament				Winners	
9 September 1998	(Malaysia) Cricket at the 1998 Commonwealth Games				South Africa	
24 October 1998	(Bangladesh) 1998 ICC KnockOut Trophy				South Africa	
6 November 1998	(United Arab Emirates) 1998–99 Champions Trophy				India	
4 December 1998	1998–99 Australia Tri-Nation Series				Australia	
16 February 1999	(India) (Sri Lanka) (Pakistan) (Bangladesh) 1998–99 Asian Test Championship				Pakistan	
19 March 1999	(Bangladesh) 1998–99 Meril International Tournament				Zimbabwe	
19 March 1999	(India) 1998–99 Pepsi Cup				Pakistan	
7 April 1999	(United Arab Emirates) 1998–99 Coca-Cola Cup				Pakistan	

== September ==
=== 1998 Commonwealth Games ===
Group A
Pos	Team	Pld	W	L	T	NR	Pts	NRR
1	Sri Lanka	3	3	0	0	0	6	1.581
2	Zimbabwe	3	2	1	0	0	4	1.887
3	Jamaica	3	1	2	0	0	2	−0.122
4	Malaysia	3	0	3	0	0	0	−3.736

Source: ESPNcricinfo

Group C
Pos	Team	Pld	W	L	T	NR	Pts	NRR
1	South Africa	3	3	0	0	0	6	1.143
2	Barbados	3	2	1	0	0	4	1.330
3	Northern Ireland	3	1	2	0	0	2	−0.643
4	Bangladesh	3	0	3	0	0	0	−1.547

Source: ESPNcricinfo

Group B
Pos	Team	Pld	W	L	T	NR	Pts	NRR
1	Australia	3	3	0	0	0	6	3.299
2	Antigua and Barbuda	3	1	1	0	1	3	0.079
3	India	3	1	1	0	1	3	−0.340
4	Canada	3	0	3	0	0	0	−2.558

Source: ESPNcricinfo

Group D
Pos	Team	Pld	W	L	T	NR	Pts	NRR
1	New Zealand	3	3	0	0	0	6	1.799
2	Pakistan	3	1	1	0	1	3	0.480
3	Kenya	3	1	2	0	0	2	−0.697
4	Scotland	3	0	2	0	1	1	−2.401

Source: ESPNcricinfo

Group stage
No.	Date	Team 1	Captain 1	Team 2	Captain 2	Venue	Result
LA 11363	9 September	Antigua and Barbuda	Dave Joseph	India	Ajay Jadeja	Tenaga National Sports Complex, Kuala Lumpur	No result
LA 11364	9 September	Canada	Ingleton Liburd	Australia	Steve Waugh	Perbadanan Kemajuan Negeri Selangor Sports Complex, Petaling Jaya	Australia by 9 wickets
LA 11365	9 September	Jamaica	Jimmy Adams	Zimbabwe	Alistair Campbell	Royal Selangor Club, Kuala Lumpur	Zimbabwe by 6 wickets
LA 11366	9 September	Malaysia	Ramesh Menon	Sri Lanka	Hashan Tillakaratne	Kelab Aman, Kuala Lumpur	Sri Lanka by 7 wickets
LA 11367	9 September	Pakistan	Saleem Elahi	Scotland	George Salmond	Victoria Institution, Kuala Lumpur	No result
LA 11369	10 September	Bangladesh	Akram Khan	Barbados	Philo Wallace	Royal Selangor Club, Kuala Lumpur	Barbados by 4 wickets (D/L)
LA 11370	10 September	Kenya	Aasif Karim	New Zealand	Stephen Fleming	Perbadanan Kemajuan Negeri Selangor Sports Complex, Petaling Jaya	New Zealand by 5 wickets
LA 11371	10 September	Northern Ireland	Alan Rutherford	South Africa	Shaun Pollock	Kelab Aman, Kuala Lumpur	South Africa by 4 wickets (D/L)
LA 11372	12 September	Antigua and Barbuda	Dave Joseph	Australia	Steve Waugh	Tenaga National Sports Complex, Kuala Lumpur	Australia by 7 wickets
LA 11373	12 September	India	Ajay Jadeja	Canada	Ingleton Liburd	Victoria Institution, Kuala Lumpur	India by 112 runs
LA 11374	12 September	Sri Lanka	Hashan Tillakaratne	Jamaica	Jimmy Adams	Perbadanan Kemajuan Negeri Selangor Sports Complex, Petaling Jaya	Sri Lanka by 67 runs
LA 11375	12 September	Pakistan	Saleem Elahi	Kenya	Aasif Karim	Rubber Research Institute Ground, Shah Alam	Pakistan by 129 runs
LA 11376	12 September	Zimbabwe	Alistair Campbell	Malaysia	Ramesh Menon	Kelab Aman, Kuala Lumpur	Zimbabwe by 221 runs
LA 11378	13 September	Bangladesh	Akram Khan	South Africa	Shaun Pollock	Perbadanan Kemajuan Negeri Selangor Sports Complex, Petaling Jaya	South Africa by 5 wickets
LA 11379	13 September	Barbados	Philo Wallace	Northern Ireland	Alan Rutherford	Rubber Research Institute Ground, Shah Alam	Barbados by 176 runs
LA 11380	13 September	New Zealand	Stephen Fleming	Scotland	George Salmond	Kelab Aman, Kuala Lumpur	New Zealand by 177 runs
LA 11390	14 September	Antigua and Barbuda	Dave Joseph	Canada	Ingleton Liburd	Royal Selangor Club, Kuala Lumpur	Antigua and Barbuda by 121 runs
LA 11391	14 September	Malaysia	Ramesh Menon	Jamaica	Jimmy Adams	Victoria Institution, Kuala Lumpur	Jamaica by 6 wickets
LA 11392	14 September	Zimbabwe	Alistair Campbell	Sri Lanka	Hashan Tillakaratne	Tenaga National Sports Complex, Kuala Lumpur	Sri Lanka by 1 wicket
LA 11393	15 September	Australia	Steve Waugh	India	Ajay Jadeja	Perbadanan Kemajuan Negeri Selangor Sports Complex, Petaling Jaya	Australia by 146 runs
LA 11394	15 September	Northern Ireland	Alan Rutherford	Bangladesh	Akram Khan	Royal Selangor Club, Kuala Lumpur	Northern Ireland by 114 runs
LA 11395	15 September	Barbados	Philo Wallace	South Africa	Shaun Pollock	Kelab Aman, Kuala Lumpur	South Africa by 4 wickets
LA 11396	15 September	Scotland	George Salmond	Kenya	Aasif Karim	Rubber Research Institute Ground, Shah Alam	Kenya by 5 wickets
LA 11397	15 September	New Zealand	Stephen Fleming	Pakistan	Arshad Khan	Tenaga National Sports Complex, Kuala Lumpur	New Zealand by 81 runs
Semi finals
No.	Date	Team 1	Captain 1	Team 2	Captain 2	Venue	Result
LA 11398	16 September	Sri Lanka	Hashan Tillakaratne	South Africa	Shaun Pollock	Perbadanan Kemajuan Negeri Selangor Sports Complex, Petaling Jaya	South Africa by 1 wicket
LA 11400	17 September	New Zealand	Stephen Fleming	Australia	Steve Waugh	Tenaga National Sports Complex, Kuala Lumpur	Australia by 9 wickets
Bronze medal match
No.	Date	Team 1	Captain 1	Team 2	Captain 2	Venue	Result
LA 11401	18 September	New Zealand	Stephen Fleming	Sri Lanka	Hashan Tillakaratne	Tenaga National Sports Complex, Kuala Lumpur	New Zealand by 51 runs
Gold medal match
No.	Date	Team 1	Captain 1	Team 2	Captain 2	Venue	Result
LA 11402	19 September	Australia	Steve Waugh	South Africa	Shaun Pollock	Perbadanan Kemajuan Negeri Selangor Sports Complex, Petaling Jaya	South Africa by 4 wickets

=== India in Zimbabwe ===
ODI series
No.	Date	Home captain	Away captain	Venue	Result
ODI 1354	26 September	Alistair Campbell	Mohammad Azharuddin	Queens Sports Club, Bulawayo	India by 8 wickets
ODI 1355	27 September	Alistair Campbell	Mohammad Azharuddin	Queens Sports Club, Bulawayo	India by 8 wickets
ODI 1356	30 September	Alistair Campbell	Mohammad Azharuddin	Harare Sports Club, Harare	Zimbabwe by 37 runs
One-off Test
No.	Date	Home captain	Away captain	Venue	Result
Test 1425	7–11 October	Alistair Campbell	Mohammad Azharuddin	Harare Sports Club, Harare	Zimbabwe by 61 runs

== October ==
=== Australia in Pakistan ===
Test series
No.	Date	Home captain	Away captain	Venue	Result
Test 1424	1–5 October	Aamer Sohail	Mark Taylor	Rawalpindi Cricket Stadium, Rawalpindi	Australia by an innings and 99 runs
Test 1426	15–19 October	Aamer Sohail	Mark Taylor	Arbab Niaz Stadium, Peshawar	Match drawn
Test 1427	22–26 October	Aamer Sohail	Mark Taylor	National Stadium, Karachi	Match drawn
ODI series
No.	Date	Home captain	Away captain	Venue	Result
ODI 1365	6 November	Aamer Sohail	Steve Waugh	National Stadium, Karachi	Australia by 43 runs
ODI 1368	8 November	Aamer Sohail	Steve Waugh	Arbab Niaz Stadium, Peshawar	Australia by 5 wickets
ODI 1371	10 November	Aamer Sohail	Steve Waugh	Gaddafi Stadium, Lahore	Australia by 6 wickets

=== 1998 ICC KnockOut Trophy ===
Preliminary Quarter-final
No.	Date	Team 1	Captain 1	Team 2	Captain 2	Venue	Result
ODI 1357	24 October	New Zealand	Stephen Fleming	Zimbabwe	Alistair Campbell	Bangabandhu National Stadium, Dhaka	New Zealand by 5 wickets
Quarter Finals
No.	Date	Team 1	Captain 1	Team 2	Captain 2	Venue	Result
ODI 1358	25 October	England	Adam Hollioake	South Africa	Hansie Cronje	Bangabandhu National Stadium, Dhaka	South Africa by 6 wickets
ODI 1359	26 October	New Zealand	Stephen Fleming	Sri Lanka	Arjuna Ranatunga	Bangabandhu National Stadium, Dhaka	Sri Lanka by 5 wickets
ODI 1360	28 October	Australia	Steve Waugh	India	Mohammad Azharuddin	Bangabandhu National Stadium, Dhaka	India by 44 runs
ODI 1361	29 October	Pakistan	Aamer Sohail	West Indies	Brian Lara	Bangabandhu National Stadium, Dhaka	West Indies by 30 runs
Semi Finals
No.	Date	Team 1	Captain 1	Team 2	Captain 2	Venue	Result
ODI 1362	30 October	South Africa	Hansie Cronje	Sri Lanka	Arjuna Ranatunga	Bangabandhu National Stadium, Dhaka	South Africa by 92 runs (D/L)
ODI 1363	31 October	India	Mohammad Azharuddin	West Indies	Brian Lara	Bangabandhu National Stadium, Dhaka	West Indies by 6 wickets
Final
No.	Date	Team 1	Captain 1	Team 2	Captain 2	Venue	Result
ODI 1364	1 November	South Africa	Hansie Cronje	West Indies	Brian Lara	Bangabandhu National Stadium, Dhaka	South Africa by 4 wickets

== November ==
=== 1998–99 Champions Trophy ===
Team	Pld	W	L	T	NR	NRR	Pts
India	4	3	1	0	0	+0.579	6
Zimbabwe	4	3	1	0	0	+0.068	6
Sri Lanka	4	0	4	0	0	−0.65	0

Group stage
No.	Date	Team 1	Captain 1	Team 2	Captain 2	Venue	Result
ODI 1366	6 November	India	Mohammad Azharuddin	Sri Lanka	Arjuna Ranatunga	Sharjah Cricket Stadium, Sharjah	India by 3 wickets
ODI 1367	7 November	Sri Lanka	Arjuna Ranatunga	Zimbabwe	Alistair Campbell	Sharjah Cricket Stadium, Sharjah	Zimbabwe by 7 wickets
ODI 1369	8 November	India	Mohammad Azharuddin	Zimbabwe	Alistair Campbell	Sharjah Cricket Stadium, Sharjah	India by 7 wickets
ODI 1370	9 November	India	Mohammad Azharuddin	Sri Lanka	Arjuna Ranatunga	Sharjah Cricket Stadium, Sharjah	India by 81 runs
ODI 1372	10 November	Sri Lanka	Arjuna Ranatunga	Zimbabwe	Alistair Campbell	Sharjah Cricket Stadium, Sharjah	Zimbabwe by 24 runs
ODI 1373	11 November	India	Ajay Jadeja	Zimbabwe	Alistair Campbell	Sharjah Cricket Stadium, Sharjah	Zimbabwe by 13 runs
Final
No.	Date	Team 1	Captain 1	Team 2	Captain 2	Venue	Result
ODI 1374	13 November	India	Ajay Jadeja	Zimbabwe	Alistair Campbell	Sharjah Cricket Stadium, Sharjah	India by 10 wickets

=== Zimbabwe in Pakistan ===
ODI series
No.	Date	Home captain	Away captain	Venue	Result
ODI 1375	20 November	Aamer Sohail	Alistair Campbell	Jinnah Stadium, Gujranwala	Pakistan by 4 wickets
ODI 1376	22 November	Aamer Sohail	Alistair Campbell	Sheikhupura Stadium, Sheikhupura	Zimbabwe by 6 wickets
ODI 1377	24 November	Aamer Sohail	Alistair Campbell	Rawalpindi Cricket Stadium, Rawalpindi	Pakistan by 11 runs
Test series
No.	Date	Home captain	Away captain	Venue	Result
Test 1430	27–30 November	Aamer Sohail	Alistair Campbell	Arbab Niaz Stadium, Peshawar	Zimbabwe by 7 wickets
Test 1432	10–14 December	Moin Khan	Alistair Campbell	Gaddafi Stadium, Lahore	Match drawn
Test 1434a	21 December	Moin Khan	Alistair Campbell	Iqbal Stadium, Faisalabad	Match abandoned

=== England in Australia ===
The Ashes Test series
No.	Date	Home captain	Away captain	Venue	Result
Test 1428	20–24 November	Mark Taylor	Alec Stewart	The Gabba, Brisbane	Match drawn
Test 1431	28–30 November	Mark Taylor	Alec Stewart	WACA Ground, Perth	Australia by 7 wickets
Test 1434	11–15 December	Mark Taylor	Alec Stewart	Adelaide Oval, Adelaide	Australia by 205 runs
Test 1436	25–29 December	Mark Taylor	Alec Stewart	Melbourne Cricket Ground, Melbourne	England by 12 runs
Test 1439	2–5 January	Mark Taylor	Alec Stewart	Sydney Cricket Ground, Sydney	Australia by 98 runs

=== West Indies in South Africa ===
Test series
No.	Date	Home captain	Away captain	Venue	Result
Test 1429	26–30 November	Hansie Cronje	Brian Lara	Wanderers Stadium, Johannesburg	South Africa by 4 wickets
Test 1433	10–12 December	Hansie Cronje	Brian Lara	St George's Park, Port Elizabeth	South Africa by 178 runs
Test 1437	26–30 December	Hansie Cronje	Brian Lara	Kingsmead Cricket Ground, Durban	South Africa by 9 wickets
Test 1440	2–6 January	Hansie Cronje	Brian Lara	Newlands Cricket Ground, Cape Town	South Africa by 149 runs
Test 1441	15–18 January	Hansie Cronje	Brian Lara	Centurion Park, Centurion	South Africa by 351 runs
ODI series
No.	Date	Home captain	Away captain	Venue	Result
ODI 1390	22 January	Hansie Cronje	Brian Lara	Wanderers Stadium, Johannesburg	South Africa by 2 wickets
ODI 1393	24 January	Hansie Cronje	Brian Lara	Buffalo Park, East London	West Indies by 43 runs
ODI 1395	27 January	Hansie Cronje	Brian Lara	Kingsmead Cricket Ground, Durban	South Africa by 55 runs
ODI 1397	30 January	Hansie Cronje	Carl Hooper	St George's Park, Port Elizabeth	South Africa by 99 runs
ODI 1399	2 February	Hansie Cronje	Carl Hooper	Newlands Cricket Ground, Cape Town	South Africa by 89 runs
ODI 1402	5 February	Hansie Cronje	Carl Hooper	Mangaung Oval, Bloemfontein	South Africa by 114 runs
ODI 1404	7 February	Hansie Cronje	Brian Lara	Centurion Park, Centurion	South Africa by 50 runs

== December ==
=== India in New Zealand ===
Test series
No.	Date	Home captain	Away captain	Venue	Result
Test 1434b	18–22 December	Stephen Fleming	Mohammad Azharuddin	Carisbrook, Dunedin	Match abandoned
Test 1435	26–30 December	Stephen Fleming	Mohammad Azharuddin	Basin Reserve, Wellington	New Zealand by 4 wickets
Test 1438	2–6 January	Stephen Fleming	Mohammad Azharuddin	Seddon Park, Hamilton	Match drawn
ODI series
No.	Date	Home captain	Away captain	Venue	Result
ODI 1378	9 January	Stephen Fleming	Mohammad Azharuddin	Owen Delany Park, Taupō	New Zealand by 5 wickets
ODI 1381	12 January	Dion Nash	Mohammad Azharuddin	McLean Park, Napier	India by 2 wickets
ODI 1383	14 January	Dion Nash	Mohammad Azharuddin	Basin Reserve, Wellington	No result
ODI 1385	16 January	Dion Nash	Mohammad Azharuddin	Eden Park, Auckland	India by 5 wickets
ODI 1387	19 January	Dion Nash	Mohammad Azharuddin	AMI Stadium, Christchurch	New Zealand by 70 runs

== January ==
=== 1998–99 Australia Tri-Nation Series ===
Pos	Team	P	W	L	NR	T	NRR	Points
1	Australia	10	7	3	0	0	14	+0.538
2	England	10	5	5	0	0	10	+0.157
3	Sri Lanka	10	3	7	0	0	6	−0.667

Group stage
No.	Date	Team 1	Captain 1	Team 2	Captain 2	Venue	Result
ODI 1379	10 January	Australia	Shane Warne	England	Alec Stewart	The Gabba, Brisbane	England by 7 runs
ODI 1380	11 January	England	Alec Stewart	Sri Lanka	Arjuna Ranatunga	The Gabba, Brisbane	England by 4 wickets
ODI 1382	13 January	Australia	Shane Warne	Sri Lanka	Arjuna Ranatunga	Sydney Cricket Ground, Sydney	Australia by 8 wickets
ODI 1384	15 January	Australia	Shane Warne	England	Alec Stewart	Melbourne Cricket Ground, Melbourne	Australia by 9 wickets
ODI 1386	17 January	Australia	Steve Waugh	England	Alec Stewart	Sydney Cricket Ground, Sydney	England by 7 runs
ODI 1388	19 January	England	Alec Stewart	Sri Lanka	Arjuna Ranatunga	Melbourne Cricket Ground, Melbourne	England by 7 wickets
ODI 1389	21 January	Australia	Steve Waugh	Sri Lanka	Arjuna Ranatunga	Bellerive Oval, Hobart	Sri Lanka by 3 wickets
ODI 1391	23 January	England	Alec Stewart	Sri Lanka	Arjuna Ranatunga	Adelaide Oval, Adelaide	Sri Lanka by 1 wicket
ODI 1392	24 January	Australia	Shane Warne	Sri Lanka	Arjuna Ranatunga	Adelaide Oval, Adelaide	Australia by 80 runs
ODI 1394	26 January	Australia	Steve Waugh	England	Alec Stewart	Adelaide Oval, Adelaide	Australia by 16 runs
ODI 1396	29 January	England	Alec Stewart	Sri Lanka	Arjuna Ranatunga	WACA Ground, Perth	England by 128 runs
ODI 1398	31 January	Australia	Shane Warne	Sri Lanka	Arjuna Ranatunga	WACA Ground, Perth	Australia by 45 runs
ODI 1400	3 February	England	Adam Hollioake	Sri Lanka	Arjuna Ranatunga	Sydney Cricket Ground, Sydney	Sri Lanka by 11 runs
ODI 1401	5 February	Australia	Steve Waugh	England	Alec Stewart	Sydney Cricket Ground, Sydney	Australia by 4 wickets
ODI 1403	7 February	Australia	Shane Warne	Sri Lanka	Arjuna Ranatunga	Melbourne Cricket Ground, Melbourne	Australia by 43 runs
Finals
No.	Date	Team 1	Captain 1	Team 2	Captain 2	Venue	Result
ODI 1405	10 February	Australia	Shane Warne	England	Alec Stewart	Sydney Cricket Ground, Sydney	Australia by 10 runs
ODI 1405a	12 February	Australia	Shane Warne	England	Alec Stewart	Melbourne Cricket Ground, Melbourne	Match abandoned
ODI 1406	13 February	Australia	Shane Warne	England	Alec Stewart	Melbourne Cricket Ground, Melbourne	Australia by 162 runs

=== Pakistan in India ===
Test series
No.	Date	Home captain	Away captain	Venue	Result
Test 1442	28–31 January	Mohammad Azharuddin	Wasim Akram	M. A. Chidambaram Stadium, Chennai	Pakistan by 12 runs
Test 1443	4–7 February	Mohammad Azharuddin	Wasim Akram	Feroz Shah Kotla Ground, Delhi	India by 212 runs

== February ==
=== South Africa in New Zealand ===
ODI series
No.	Date	Home captain	Away captain	Venue	Result
ODI 1407	14 February	Dion Nash	Hansie Cronje	Carisbrook, Dunedin	New Zealand by 3 wickets
ODI 1408	17 February	Dion Nash	Hansie Cronje	AMI Stadium, Christchurch	South Africa by 7 wickets
ODI 1409	20 February	Dion Nash	Hansie Cronje	Eden Park, Auckland	New Zealand by 7 wickets
ODI 1419	25 March	Stephen Fleming	Hansie Cronje	McLean Park, Napier	No result
ODI 1421	26 March	Stephen Fleming	Hansie Cronje	Eden Park, Auckland	South Africa by 2 wickets
ODI 1422	27 March	Stephen Fleming	Hansie Cronje	Eden Park, Auckland	South Africa by 143 runs
ODI 1425	30 March	Stephen Fleming	Hansie Cronje	Basin Reserve, Wellington	No result
ODI 1426a	31 March	Stephen Fleming	Hansie Cronje	Basin Reserve, Wellington	Match abandoned
Test series
No.	Date	Home captain	Away captain	Venue	Result
Test 1446	27 February-3 March	Dion Nash	Hansie Cronje	Eden Park, Auckland	Match drawn
Test 1449	11–15 March	Dion Nash	Hansie Cronje	AMI Stadium, Christchurch	Match drawn
Test 1452	18–22 March	Dion Nash	Hansie Cronje	Basin Reserve, Wellington	South Africa by 8 wickets

=== 1998–99 Asian Test Championship ===
Team	Matches	Won	Drawn	Lost	Bonus Batting	Bonus Bowling	Total points
Pakistan	2	1	1	0	5	8	25
Sri Lanka	2	0	2	0	6	5	11
India	2	0	1	1	5	5	10

Group stage
No.	Date	Team 1	Captain 1	Team 2	Captain 2	Venue	Result
Test 1444	16-20 February 1999	India	Mohammad Azharuddin	Pakistan	Wasim Akram	Eden Gardens, Kolkata	Pakistan by 46 runs
Test 1445	24-28 February 1999	Sri Lanka	Arjuna Ranatunga	India	Mohammad Azharuddin	Singhalese Sports Club Cricket Ground, Colombo	Match drawn
Test 1447	4-8 March 1999	Pakistan	Wasim Akram	Sri Lanka	Hashan Tillakaratne	Gaddafi Stadium, Lahore	Match drawn
Final
Test 1450	12-15 March 1999	Pakistan	Wasim Akram	Sri Lanka	Aravinda de Silva	Bangabandhu National Stadium, Dhaka	Pakistan by an innings and 175 runs

== March ==
=== Australia in the West Indies ===
Test series
No.	Date	Home captain	Away captain	Venue	Result
Test 1448	5–8 March	Brian Lara	Steve Waugh	Queen's Park Oval, Port of Spain	Australia by 312 runs
Test 1451	13–16 March	Brian Lara	Steve Waugh	Sabina Park, Kingston	West Indies by 10 wickets
Test 1453	26–30 March	Brian Lara	Steve Waugh	Kensington Oval, Bridgetown	West Indies by 1 wicket
Test 1454	3–7 April	Brian Lara	Steve Waugh	Antigua Recreation Ground, St. John's	Australia by 176 runs
ODI series
No.	Date	Home captain	Away captain	Venue	Result
ODI 1433	11 April	Brian Lara	Steve Waugh	Arnos Vale Stadium, Kingstown	West Indies by 44 runs
ODI 1436	14 April	Brian Lara	Steve Waugh	National Cricket Stadium, St. George's	Australia by 46 runs
ODI 1438	17 April	Brian Lara	Steve Waugh	Queen's Park Oval, Port of Spain	West Indies by 5 wickets
ODI 1439	18 April	Brian Lara	Steve Waugh	Queen's Park Oval, Port of Spain	Australia by 20 runs
ODI 1440	21 April	Jimmy Adams	Steve Waugh	Bourda, Georgetown	Match tied
ODI 1441	24 April	Jimmy Adams	Steve Waugh	Kensington Oval, Bridgetown	Australia by 4 wickets
ODI 1442	25 April	Jimmy Adams	Steve Waugh	Kensington Oval, Bridgetown	West Indies by 8 wickets

=== Pakistan in Bangladesh ===
ODI series
No.	Date	Home captain	Away captain	Venue	Result
ODI 1410	16 March	Aminul Islam	Wasim Akram	Bangabandhu National Stadium, Dhaka	Pakistan by 152 runs

=== 1998–99 Pepsi Cup ===
Group stage
No.	Date	Team 1	Captain 1	Team 2	Captain 2	Venue	Result
ODI 1411	19 March	Pakistan	Wasim Akram	Sri Lanka	Arjuna Ranatunga	Keenan Stadium, Jamshedpur	Pakistan by 9 runs
ODI 1415	22 March	India	Mohammad Azharuddin	Sri Lanka	Arjuna Ranatunga	Vidarbha Cricket Association Ground, Nagpur	India by 80 runs
ODI 1417	24 March	India	Mohammad Azharuddin	Pakistan	Wasim Akram	Sawai Mansingh Stadium, Jaipur	Pakistan by 143 runs
ODI 1423	27 March	Pakistan	Wasim Akram	Sri Lanka	Arjuna Ranatunga	Indira Priyadarshini Stadium, Visakhapatnam	Sri Lanka by 12 runs
ODI 1426	30 March	India	Ajay Jadeja	Sri Lanka	Arjuna Ranatunga	Nehru Stadium, Pune	India by 51 runs
ODI 1427	1 April	India	Ajay Jadeja	Pakistan	Wasim Akram	PCA IS Bindra Stadium, Mohali	Pakistan by 7 wickets
Final
No.	Date	Team 1	Captain 1	Team 2	Captain 2	Venue	Result
ODI 1428	4 April	India	Ajay Jadeja	Pakistan	Wasim Akram	M. Chinnaswamy Stadium, Bangalore	Pakistan by 123 runs

=== 1998–99 Meril International Tournament ===
Pos	Team	P	W	L	NR	T	Points	NRR
1	Zimbabwe	4	4	0	0	0	8	+1.649
2	Kenya	4	2	2	0	0	4	-0.483
3	Bangladesh	4	0	4	0	0	0	-1.200

Group stage
No.	Date	Team 1	Captain 1	Team 2	Captain 2	Venue	Result
ODI 1412	19 March	Kenya	Aasif Karim	Zimbabwe	Alistair Campbell	Bangabandhu National Stadium, Dhaka	Zimbabwe by 133 runs
ODI 1413	20 March	Bangladesh	Aminul Islam	Kenya	Aasif Karim	Bangabandhu National Stadium, Dhaka	Kenya by 8 wickets
ODI 1414	21 March	Bangladesh	Aminul Islam	Zimbabwe	Alistair Campbell	Bangabandhu National Stadium, Dhaka	Zimbabwe by 126 runs
ODI 1416	23 March	Kenya	Aasif Karim	Zimbabwe	Alistair Campbell	Bangabandhu National Stadium, Dhaka	Zimbabwe by 64 runs
ODI 1418	24 March	Bangladesh	Aminul Islam	Kenya	Aasif Karim	Bangabandhu National Stadium, Dhaka	Kenya by 73 runs
ODI 1420	25 March	Bangladesh	Aminul Islam	Zimbabwe	Alistair Campbell	Bangabandhu National Stadium, Dhaka	Zimbabwe by 3 wickets
Final
No.	Date	Team 1	Captain 1	Team 2	Captain 2	Venue	Result
ODI 1424	27 March	Kenya	Aasif Karim	Zimbabwe	Alistair Campbell	Bangabandhu National Stadium, Dhaka	Zimbabwe by 202 runs

== April ==
=== 1998–99 Coca-Cola Cup ===
Team	Pld	W	L	T	NR	NRR	Pts
India	4	3	1	0	0	−0.392	6
Pakistan	4	2	2	0	0	+0.678	4
England	4	1	3	0	0	−0.285	2

Group stage
No.	Date	Team 1	Captain 1	Team 2	Captain 2	Venue	Result
ODI 1429	7 April	England	Alec Stewart	Pakistan	Wasim Akram	Sharjah Cricket Stadium, Sharjah	Pakistan by 90 runs
ODI 1430	8 April	India	Mohammad Azharuddin	Pakistan	Wasim Akram	Sharjah Cricket Stadium, Sharjah	Pakistan by 116 runs
ODI 1431	9 April	England	Alec Stewart	India	Mohammad Azharuddin	Sharjah Cricket Stadium, Sharjah	India by 20 runs
ODI 1432	11 April	England	Alec Stewart	India	Ajay Jadeja	Sharjah Cricket Stadium, Sharjah	India by 9 runs
ODI 1434	12 April	England	Alec Stewart	Pakistan	Wasim Akram	Sharjah Cricket Stadium, Sharjah	England by 62 runs
ODI 1435	13 April	India	Ajay Jadeja	Pakistan	Wasim Akram	Sharjah Cricket Stadium, Sharjah	India by 6 wickets
Final
No.	Date	Team 1	Captain 1	Team 2	Captain 2	Venue	Result
ODI 1437	16 April	India	Mohammad Azharuddin	Pakistan	Wasim Akram	Sharjah Cricket Stadium, Sharjah	Pakistan by 8 wickets
