= Antigua and Barbuda at the 2022 World Athletics Championships =

- Flag of Antigua and Barbuda
- WA code: ANT
- National federation: Antigua & Barbuda Athletic Association

in Eugene, United States 15–24 July 2022
- Competitors: 2 (1 man and 1 woman)
- Medals: Gold 0 Silver 0 Bronze 0 Total 0

World Athletics Championships appearances
- 1983; 1987; 1991; 1993; 1995; 1997; 1999; 2001; 2003; 2005; 2007; 2009; 2011; 2013; 2015; 2017; 2019; 2022; 2023; 2025

Antigua and Barbuda competed at the 2022 World Athletics Championships in Eugene, United States, from 15 to 24 July 2022.

== Results ==
Antigua and Barbuda entered 2 athletes.

Key

- Q = Qualified for the next round
- q = Qualified for the next round as a fastest loser or, in field events, by position without achieving the qualifying target
- NR = National record
- PB = Personal best
- SB = Season best
- N/A = Round not applicable for the event

=== Men ===
Track and road

Athlete	Event	Preliminary		Heat		Semi-final		Final	
Athlete	Event	Result	Rank	Result	Rank	Result	Rank	Result	Rank
Cejhae Greene	100 m	—N/a		10.17 (−0.1)	27	Did not advance			

=== Women ===
Track and road

Athlete	Event	Heat		Semi-final		Final	
Athlete	Event	Result	Rank	Result	Rank	Result	Rank
Joella Lloyd	100 m	11.27 (+0.2)	27	did not advance			
Joella Lloyd	200 m	22.99 (−0.2)	23 q	23.38	23 (−0.1)	did not advance	
