= Antigua and Barbuda at the 2011 World Championships in Athletics =

- WA code: ANT
- National federation: Antigua & Barbuda Athletic Association

in Daegu
- Competitors: 2
- Medals: Gold 0 Silver 0 Bronze 0 Total 0

World Championships in Athletics appearances
- 1983; 1987; 1991; 1993; 1995; 1997; 1999; 2001; 2003; 2005; 2007; 2009; 2011; 2013; 2015; 2017; 2019; 2022; 2023; 2025

Antigua and Barbuda competed at the 2011 World Championships in Athletics from August 27 to September 4 in Daegu, South Korea. A team of 2 athletes was announced to represent the country in the event. Sprinter Daniel “Bakka” Bailey finished 5th at the last world championships 100 m event.

== Results ==
=== Men ===
Athlete	Event	Preliminaries		Heats		Semifinals		Final	
Athlete	Event	Time Width Height	Rank	Time Width Height	Rank	Time Width Height	Rank	Time Width Height	Rank
Daniel Bailey	100 metres			10.34 Q	18	10.14 q	7	10.26	5
Brendan Christian	200 metres			Did not start					
