= Antigua and Barbuda at the 2010 Commonwealth Games =

- CG code: ANT
- CGA: Antigua and Barbuda National Olympic Committee
- Website: antiguabarbudanoc.com

in Delhi, India
- Competitors: 17 in 5 sports
- Flag bearers: Opening: James Grayman; Closing:
- Medals: Gold 0 Silver 0 Bronze 0 Total 0

Commonwealth Games appearances (overview)
- 1966; 1970; 1974; 1978; 1982–1990; 1994; 1998; 2002; 2006; 2010; 2014; 2018; 2022; 2026; 2030

Antigua and Barbuda competed in the 2010 Commonwealth Games held in Delhi, India, from 3 to 14 October 2010. Despite concerns about safety and their accommodations, the team planned to compete. Antigua and Barbuda competed in athletics, cycling, shooting, swimming and boxing. The delegation was made up of seventeen athletes and nine officials.

== Competitors ==
| Sport | Men | Women | Total |
|---|---|---|---|
| Athletics | 5 | 1 | 6 |
| Boxing | 1 | — | 1 |
| Cycling | 5 | — | 5 |
| Shooting | 4 | — | 4 |
| Swimming | — | 1 | 1 |
| Total | 15 | 2 | 17 |

== Athletics ==
Key

- Note–Ranks given for track events are within the athlete's heat only
- Q = Qualified for the next round
- q = Qualified for the next round as a fastest loser or, in field events, by position without achieving the qualifying target
- NR = National record
- N/A = Round not applicable for the event
- Bye = Athlete not required to compete in round

Men
Track & road events

| Athlete | Event | Round 1 | | Round 2 | | Semifinal | | Final | |
| Athlete | Event | Result | Rank | Result | Rank | Result | Rank | Result | Rank |
|---|---|---|---|---|---|---|---|---|---|
| Richard Richardson | 100m | 10.70 | 6 | did not advance | | | | | |
| Chavaughn Camarley | 100m | 10.82 | 6 | did not advance | | | | | |
| Richard Richardson | 200m | 21.37 | 4 q | 21.65 | 7 | Did not advance | | | |
| Chavaughn Camarley | 200m | DNS | | | | | | | |

Field events

| Athlete | Event | Qualification | | Final | |
| Athlete | Event | Distance | Position | Distance | Position |
|---|---|---|---|---|---|
| James Grayman | High jump | 2.16 | 8 Q | 2.15 | 12 |
| Ayata Joseph | Triple jump | N/A | | DNS | |
| Oraine Brown | Javelin throw | N/A | | DNS | |

Women
Field events

| Athlete | Event | Qualification | | Final | |
| Athlete | Event | Distance | Position | Distance | Position |
|---|---|---|---|---|---|
| Althea Charles | Hammer throw | 54.16 | 16 | Did not advance | |

== Boxing ==
Antigua entered one boxer into the light heavyweight classification.

| Athlete | Event | Round of 32 | Round of 16 | Quarterfinals | Semifinals | Final | |
| Athlete | Event | Opposition Result | Opposition Result | Opposition Result | Opposition Result | Opposition Result | Rank |
|---|---|---|---|---|---|---|---|
| Yakita Aska | Light heavyweight | Saraku (GHA); L 4-18 | Did not advance | | | | |

== Cycling ==
=== Road ===
Men

== See also ==
- 2010 Commonwealth Games
