= Antigua and Barbuda at the 2006 Commonwealth Games =

- CG code: ANT
- CGA: Antigua and Barbuda National Olympic Committee
- Website: antiguabarbudanoc.com

in Melbourne, Australia
- Competitors: 18 (16 Men, 2 Women)
- Flag bearers: Opening: Closing:
- Medals: Gold 0 Silver 0 Bronze 0 Total 0

Commonwealth Games appearances (overview)
- 1966; 1970; 1974; 1978; 1982–1990; 1994; 1998; 2002; 2006; 2010; 2014; 2018; 2022; 2026; 2030

Team badge used at Melbourne 2006

Antigua & Barbuda was represented at the 2006 Commonwealth Games in Melbourne by a contingent comprising 18 sportspersons. Even though the nation did not earn a medal at these Games, the 4 x 100 relay team, featuring N'Kosie Barnes, Ivan Miller, Daniel Bailey, and anchor Brendan Christian, broke the Antigua & Barbuda national 4 x 100 record in the heats with a time of 39.9 seconds, and placed fifth in the finals.

== Competitors ==
The following is the list of number of competitors participating in the Games.

Sport	Men	Women	Total
Athletics	6	1	7
Cycling	3	0	3
Shooting	6	0	6
Swimming	0	1	1
Triathlon	1	0	1
Total	16	2	18

== Athletics ==
Men
Track

Athlete	Events	Round 1		Round 2		Semifinal		Final	
Athlete	Events	Result	Rank	Result	Rank	Result	Rank	Result	Rank
Daniel Bailey	100 m	10.43	3 Q	10.38	5	Did not advance			
Brendan Christian	200 m	21.00	4 q	20.98	4 q	21.10	7	Did not advance	
Ivan Miller	200 m	21.80	4	Did not advance					
Nkosie Barnes	400 m	49.69	5	Did not advance					
Nkosie Barnes; Daniel Bailey; Ivan Miller; Brendan Christian	4 × 100 m relay	39.90 NR	3 q	—N/a				40.76	5

Field

Athlete	Events	Qualification		Final	
Athlete	Events	Result	Rank	Result	Rank
Ayata Joseph	Triple jump	—N/a		15.48	12
James Grayman	High jump	2.10	12 q	2.10	9

Women
Track

Athlete	Events	Heat		Semifinal		Final	
Athlete	Events	Result	Rank	Result	Rank	Result	Rank
Sonia Williams	100 m	12.27	5 q	12.05	8	Did not advance	

Key

- Note–Ranks given for track events are within the athlete's heat only
- Q = Qualified for the next round
- q = Qualified for the next round as a fastest loser or, in field events, by position without achieving the qualifying target
- NR = National record
- WB = World Best
- N/A = Round not applicable for the event
- Bye = Athlete not required to compete in round

== Cycling ==
=== Road ===
Men

Athlete	Event	Time	Rank
Ken Jackson	Road race	DNF	
Ken Jackson	Time trial	1:03:20.92	54
Robert Marsh	Road race	DNF	
Robert Marsh	Time trial	1:01:07.50	48
Lynn Murray	Road race	DNF	
Lynn Murray	Time trial	1:03:28.38	55

== Shooting ==
Men

Athlete	Event	Qualification		Final	
Athlete	Event	Points	Rank	Points	Rank
Vernon Meade	25m Standard Pistol	—N/a		486	28
Frank Theodore	25m Standard Pistol	—N/a		422	31
Ivan Ambrose; Stephans Winter	50m Rifle Prone Pairs	—N/a		1095	17

Open

Athlete	Event	Qualification		Final	
Athlete	Event	Points	Rank	Points	Rank
Ivor Gomes	Full Bore	—N/a		288.08	38
Christopher Joseph	Full Bore	—N/a		332.10	37
Ivor Gomes; Christopher Joseph	Full Bore Pairs	—N/a		464.14	19

== Swimming ==
Women

Athlete	Events	Heat		Semifinal		Final	
Athlete	Events	Time	Rank	Time	Rank	Time	Rank
Christal Clashing O'Reilly	50 m freestyle	32.13	45	Did not advance			
Christal Clashing O'Reilly	50 m breaststroke	43.05	24	Did not advance			

== Triathlon ==
Athlete	Event	Swim (1.5 km)	Bike (40 km)	Run (10 km)	Total time	Rank
Elliott Mason	Men's	28:36.20	1:12:11.26	37:57.30	2:18:44.76	27
