= Antigua and Barbuda at the 2007 World Championships in Athletics =

- Flag of Antigua and Barbuda
- WA code: ANT

in Osaka, Japan 25 August 2007 – 2 September 2007
- Competitors: 2 (2 men and 0 women)
- Medals: Gold 0 Silver 0 Bronze 0 Total 0

World Championships in Athletics appearances
- 1983; 1987; 1991; 1993; 1995; 1997; 1999; 2001; 2003; 2005; 2007; 2009; 2011; 2013; 2015; 2017; 2019; 2022; 2023; 2025

Antigua and Barbuda competed at the 2007 World Athletics Championships in Osaka, Japan, from 25 August to 2 September 2007.

== Results ==
Antigua and Barbuda entered 2 athletes.

Key

- Q = Qualified for the next round
- q = Qualified for the next round as a fastest loser or, in field events, by position without achieving the qualifying target
- NR = National record
- PB = Personal best
- SB = Season best
- N/A = Round not applicable for the event

=== Men ===
Track and road events

Athlete	Event	Heat		Quarter-final		Semifinal		Final		Final Rank
Athlete	Event	Result	Rank	Result	Rank	Result	Rank	Result	Rank	Final Rank
Brendan Christian	100 metres	10.16 Q, SB	1	10.26 Q	3	10.29	7	Did not advance		14
Brendan Christian	200 metres	20.23 Q, NR	3	20.36 Q	3	20.36	5	Did not advance		9

Field events

Athlete	Event	Qualifying		Final		Final Rank
Athlete	Event	Result	Rank	Result	Rank	Final Rank
James Grayman	High Jump	2.14	19	Did not advance		38
