= Miss Caribbean UK 2014 =

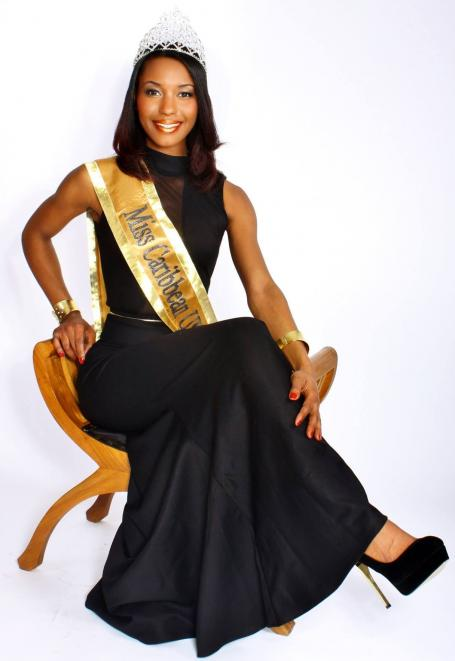
- Miss Caribbean UK 2014
- Date: 30 November 2014
- Presenters: W-Livingston Gilchrist
- Entertainment: Audrey Scott; Myself UK Dance Company; ASH-I; Phase 5 Steelband
- Venue: Tabernacle, Notting Hill, London
- Entrants: 8
- Placements: 3
- Winner: Keeleigh Griffith (Barbados)

Miss Caribbean UK 2014, the inaugural edition of the Miss Caribbean UK pageant, was held on 30 November 2014 at the Tabernacle, Notting Hill in London, UK. Co-founder and pageant director Jacqui Brown crowned her first queen Keeleigh Griffith representing Barbados on the 38th anniversary of the Barbados Independence Act 1966. Eight contestants competed for the crown.
