= Antigua and Barbuda at the 2002 Commonwealth Games =

Sporting event delegation

- CG code: ANT
- CGA: Antigua and Barbuda National Olympic Committee
- Website: antiguabarbudanoc.com

in Manchester, England
- Competitors: 4 (2 Men, 2 Women)
- Flag bearers: Opening: Closing:
- Medals: Gold 0 Silver 0 Bronze 0 Total 0

Commonwealth Games appearances (overview)
- 1966; 1970; 1974; 1978; 1982–1990; 1994; 1998; 2002; 2006; 2010; 2014; 2018; 2022; 2026; 2030

Antigua and Barbuda was represented at the 2002 Commonwealth Games by Anguilla Amateur Athletic Association (AAAA) and abbreviated xx.

Antigua and Barbuda was first represented the 1998 Commonwealth Games in Kuala Lumpur. This was Antigua and Barbuda's second Games.

== Medals ==
	Gold	Silver	Bronze	Total
Antigua and Barbuda	0	0	0	0

== Athletics ==
Women's 100 Metres

- Heather Barbara Samuel - 6th in Semi Final 1, 11.56 s

Women's 200 Metres

- Heather Barbara Samuel - Did Not Start in Heat 4

Men's 400 Metres

- Quincy Anthony - 7th in Quarter Final 2, 47.61 s

Women's 800 Metres

- Janill Williams - 5th in Heat 5, 2 mins 11.58 s

Men's Triple Jump

- Ayata Joseph - 11th, 15.15 metres
