= Antigua and Barbuda at the Commonwealth Games =

- CGF code: ANT
- CGA: Antigua and Barbuda National Olympic Committee
- Website: antiguabarbudanoc.com
- Medals: Gold 0 Silver 0 Bronze 0 Total 0

Commonwealth Games appearances (overview)
- 1966; 1970; 1974; 1978; 1982–1990; 1994; 1998; 2002; 2006; 2010; 2014; 2018; 2022; 2026; 2030

Antigua and Barbuda have competed in nine Commonwealth Games, beginning in 1966. They did not attend in 1974, and after their return to the Games in 1978, did not compete again until 1994. They have competed in every Games since, but still have not won their first Commonwealth Games medal.
