= Antigua and Barbuda at the 2009 World Championships in Athletics =

- WA code: ANT

in Berlin
- Competitors: 2 (2 men)
- Medals: Gold 0 Silver 0 Bronze 0 Total 0

World Championships in Athletics appearances
- 1983; 1987; 1991; 1993; 1995; 1997; 1999; 2001; 2003; 2005; 2007; 2009; 2011; 2013; 2015; 2017; 2019; 2022; 2023; 2025

Antigua and Barbuda competed at the 2009 World Championships in Athletics in Berlin, Germany, which were held from 15 to 23 August 2009. The athlete delegation consisted of two competitors, sprinters Daniel Bailey and Brendan Christian. Bailey competed in the men's 100 metres and reached the final, placing fourth, while Christian competed in the men's 200 metres and reached the semifinals.

== Background ==
The 2009 World Championships in Athletics were held at the Olympiastadion in Berlin, Germany. Under the auspices of the International Amateur Athletic Federation, this was the twelfth edition of the World Championships. It was held from 15 to 23 August 2009 and had 47 different events. Among the competing teams was Antigua and Barbuda. For this edition of the World Championships in Athletics, sprinters Daniel Bailey and Brendan Christian competed for the nation in the men's 100 metres and men's 200 metres, respectively.

== Results ==
=== Men ===
Bailey first competed in the qualifying heats of the men's 100 metres on 15 August 2009 in the fifth heat against six other competitors. There, he recorded a time of 10.26 seconds and placed first, advancing further. He then competed in the quarterfinals held the same day in the fifth heat against seven other competitors. There, he recorded a time of 10.02 seconds and again placed first, advancing further. In the semifinal held a day later, he competed in the first semifinal against seven other competitors. There, he recorded a time of 9.96 seconds and placed second, advancing to the finals. In the finals, he competed against seven other athletes and recorded a time of 9.93 seconds, placing fourth.

Christian competed in the qualifying heats of the men's 200 metres on 18 August 2009 in the second heat against seven other competitors. There, he recorded a time of 20.81 seconds and placed first, advancing further. He then competed in the quarterfinals held the same day in the third heat against seven other competitors. There, he recorded a time of 20.58 seconds and placed fourth, advancing further as his fast was time enough despite being outside of the top three of his heat. In the semifinals held the next day, he competed in the first semifinal against seven other competitors. There, he recorded a time of 20.79 seconds and placed last, failing to advance to the finals.

Event	Athletes	Heats		Quarterfinals		Semifinal		Final	
Event	Athletes	Result	Rank	Result	Rank	Result	Rank	Result	Rank
100 m	Daniel Bailey	10.26	1	10.02	1	9.96	2	9.93	4
200 m	Brendan Christian	20.81	1	20.58	4	20.79	8	did not advance	
