= Antigua and Barbuda at the 2023 World Athletics Championships =

- Flag of Antigua and Barbuda
- WA code: ANT

in Budapest, Hungary 19 August 2023 – 27 August 2023
- Competitors: 1 (1 man and 0 women)
- Medals: Gold 0 Silver 0 Bronze 0 Total 0

World Athletics Championships appearances
- 1983; 1987; 1991; 1993; 1995; 1997; 1999; 2001; 2003; 2005; 2007; 2009; 2011; 2013; 2015; 2017; 2019; 2022; 2023; 2025

Antigua and Barbuda competed at the 2023 World Athletics Championships in Budapest, Hungary, which were held from 19 to 27 August 2023. The athlete delegation of the country was composed of one competitor, sprinter Cejhae Greene who would compete in the men's 100 metres. He qualified for the Championships after he ranked 52nd in the World Athletics Rankings. In the heats, Webster placed sixth out of the eight competitors that competed in his heat and did not advance to the semifinals of the event.

== Background ==
The 2023 World Athletics Championships in Budapest, Hungary, were held from 19 to 27 August 2023. The Championships were held at the National Athletics Centre. To qualify for the World Championships, athletes had to reach an entry standard (e.g. time or distance), place in a specific position at select competitions, be a wild card entry, or qualify through their World Athletics Ranking at the end of the qualification period.

Sprinter Cejhae Greene would be the sole representative for the nation at the championships. He qualified after he ranked 52nd in the World Athletics Rankings for the men's 100 metres with a score of 1219 points. This was Greene's fourth consecutive appearance for Antigua and Barbuda at the World Athletics Championships. His fastest valid mark set during the lead-up to the Championships was 10.11 seconds set in Nashville, Tennessee.

== Results ==
Key

- Q = Qualified for the next round
- q = Qualified for the next round as a fastest loser or, in field events, by position without achieving the qualifying target
- NR = National record
- PB = Personal best
- SB = Season best
- N/A = Round not applicable for the event

=== Men ===
Greene competed in the heats of the Men's 100 metres on 19 August against seven other competitors in his heat. He raced in the fourth heat and recorded a time of 10.23 seconds. There, he placed sixth and did not advance further to the semifinals.

Track and road events

Athlete	Event	Heat		Semifinal		Final	
Athlete	Event	Result	Rank	Result	Rank	Result	Rank
Cejhae Greene	100 metres	10.23	6	Did not advance			
