= Vaughn Walsh =

Antiguan cricketer (born 1964)

Personal information
- Full name: Vaughn Anthony Walsh
- Born: 2 December 1964 (age 61); Liberta, Antigua
- Height: 5 ft 8 in (1.73 m)
- Batting: Right-handed
- Bowling: Right-arm fast
- Relatives: Hayden Walsh Sr. (brother); Hayden Walsh Jr. (nephew)

Domestic team information
- Years: Team
- 1991-92 to 1993-94: Leeward Islands
- 1995-96 to 1996-97: Griqualand West

Career statistics
Competition	First-class	List A
Matches	27	27
Runs scored	268	67
Batting average	11.65	8.37
100s/50s	0/1	0/0
Top score	51	18 not out
Balls bowled	5277	1278
Wickets	92	40
Bowling average	29.85	24.27
5 wickets in innings	2	0
10 wickets in match	0	n/a
Best bowling	6/52	4/37
Catches/stumpings	9/–	6/–
- Source: Cricinfo, 6 November 2019

Vaughn Anthony Walsh (born 2 December 1964) is a former Antiguan cricketer who played first-class and List A cricket from 1992 to 1997.

Vaughn Walsh was considered one of the fastest bowlers in the West Indies in the early 1990s. While living in England in 1991, in a match for his club Leicester Nomads he took 9 for 2. He played three seasons for Leeward Islands from 1991-92 to 1993-94, with best first-class figures of 6 for 77 against Guyana in his second match. He played the 1995–96 and 1996-97 seasons for Griqualand West in South Africa, when his best figures were 6 for 52 in his first match.
