= Hayden Walsh Jr. =

American-born cricketer (born 1992)

Personal information
- Full name: Hayden Rashidi Walsh
- Born: 23 April 1992 (age 34); St. Croix, U.S. Virgin Islands
- Batting: Left-handed
- Bowling: Right-arm leg break
- Role: Bowler
- Relatives: Hayden Walsh Sr. (father); Vaughn Walsh (uncle); Tahir Walsh (Brother)

International information
- National sides: United States (2018–2019); West Indies (2019–2024)
- ODI debut (cap 24/194): 27 April 2019; United States v PNG
- Last ODI: 23 October 2024; West Indies v Sri Lanka
- ODI shirt no.: 86
- T20I debut (cap 11/82): 15 March 2019; United States v UAE
- Last T20I: 26 May 2024; West Indies v South Africa
- T20I shirt no.: 86

Domestic team information
- Years: Team
- 2011/12–2014/15, 2019/20–2024/25: Leeward Islands
- 2015/16–2018/19: Barbados
- 2018: St Kitts and Nevis Patriots
- 2019–2022: Barbados Royals
- 2023: Jamaica Tallawahs
- 2024: Worcestershire
- 2024: Antigua & Barbuda Falcons

Career statistics
Competition	ODI	T20I	FC	LA
Matches	25	39	39	66
Runs scored	176	150	822	809
Batting average	16.00	15.00	14.42	20.74
100s/50s	–/–	–/–	–/2	–/3
Top score	46*	28	86	60*
Balls bowled	1087	635	4543	2603
Wickets	28	31	81	79
Bowling average	36.07	15.0	37.12	29.78
5 wickets in innings	1	–	3	2
10 wickets in match	–	–	–	–
Best bowling	5/39	3/23	6/47	5/39
Catches/stumpings	4/–	9/–	24/–	22/–
- Source: ESPNcricinfo, 9 April 2025

Hayden Rashidi Walsh (born 23 April 1992) is an American cricketer who has represented both the United States and the West Indies cricket teams in international cricket. He was born in the United States Virgin Islands to an Antiguan father, Hayden Walsh Sr. He is a left-handed batsman and right-arm leg-spin bowler.

== Background ==
Walsh was born on Saint Croix, in the U.S. Virgin Islands, and is therefore an American citizen. His Antiguan father, Hayden Walsh Sr., and uncle, Vaughn Walsh, both played first-class matches for the Leeward Islands.

== West Indian domestic cricket ==
Walsh made his first-class debut for the Leeward Islands during the 2011–12 Regional Four Day Competition. In his third match, against Trinidad and Tobago, he took figures of 4/47, including the wickets of West Indies internationals Jason Mohammed and Rayad Emrit. Walsh's highest first-class score to date came during the 2013–14 season of the competition, an innings of 86 against Jamaica.

He made his Twenty20 debut for St Kitts and Nevis Patriots in the 2018 Caribbean Premier League on 28 August 2018.

== USA cricket ==
In October 2018, Walsh was named in the United States' squad for the 2018 ICC World Cricket League Division Three tournament in Oman. In February 2019, he was named in the United States' Twenty20 International (T20I) squad for their series against the United Arab Emirates. The matches were the first T20I fixtures to be played by the United States cricket team. He made his T20I debut for the United States against the United Arab Emirates on 15 March 2019.

In April 2019, he was named in the United States cricket team's squad for the 2019 ICC World Cricket League Division Two tournament in Namibia. The United States finished in the top four places in the tournament, therefore gaining One Day International (ODI) status. Walsh made his ODI debut for the United States on 27 April 2019, against Papua New Guinea, in the tournament's third-place playoff.

In June 2019, he was named in a 30-man training squad for the United States cricket team, ahead of the Regional Finals of the 2018–19 ICC T20 World Cup Americas Qualifier tournament in Bermuda. Later the same month, he was selected to play for the Vancouver Knights franchise team in the 2019 Global T20 Canada tournament. In August 2019, he was named in the United States' squad for the Regional Finals of the 2018–19 ICC T20 World Cup Americas Qualifier tournament.

== West Indies career ==
In October 2019, he was named in the Leeward Islands' squad for the 2019–20 Regional Super50 tournament.

In October 2019, Walsh was named in the West Indies' One Day International (ODI) and Twenty20 International (T20I) squads for their series against Afghanistan in India. On 6 November 2019, he made his ODI debut for the West Indies against Afghanistan, after previously playing one ODI for the United States, becoming the 14th cricketer to represent two international teams in ODIs. On 14 November 2019, he made his T20I debut for the West Indies, also against Afghanistan. Walsh had previously played eight T20Is for the United States, becoming the ninth cricketer to represent two international teams in T20Is.

In July 2020, he was named in the Barbados Tridents squad for the 2020 Caribbean Premier League.

In December 2020, Walsh was named in West Indies's ODI squad for their series against Bangladesh. But after testing positive for COVID-19, he was ruled out of the three match ODI series. In July 2021, Hayden Walsh Jr. was named Player of the Series in the 5 match T20I series against Australia after picking 12 wickets.

In July 2021, in the opening match of the series against Australia, Walsh took his first five-wicket haul in ODI cricket. On 8 August 2021, ICC announced that Walsh, Shakib Al Hasan and Mitchell Marsh was nominated for ICC Player of the Month awards for July 2021. In September 2021, Walsh was named in the West Indies' squad for the 2021 ICC Men's T20 World Cup.

== See also ==
- List of Leeward Islands first-class cricketers
