= Antigua and Barbuda at the 1978 Commonwealth Games =

- CG code: ANT
- CGA: Antigua and Barbuda National Olympic Committee
- Website: antiguabarbudanoc.com

in Edmonton, Alberta, Canada
- Competitors: 5 in 1 sport
- Medals: Gold 0 Silver 0 Bronze 0 Total 0

Commonwealth Games appearances (overview)
- 1966; 1970; 1974; 1978; 1982–1990; 1994; 1998; 2002; 2006; 2010; 2014; 2018; 2022; 2026; 2030

Antigua and Barbuda competed in the 1978 Commonwealth Games in Edmonton, Alberta, Canada from 3 to 12 August 1978. Their team consisted of five male athletes competing in track and field events.

== Athletics ==
Men

Track & road events

Athlete	Event	Heat		Semifinal		Final	
Athlete	Event	Result	Rank	Result	Rank	Result	Rank
Cuthbert Jacobs	200 m	21.63	5	did not advance			
Fred Sowerby	400 m	—N/a		—N/a		47.51	7
Elory Turner	400 m	48.35	6	did not advance			
Lester Flax	400 m	49.42	6	did not advance			
Cuthbert Jacobs; Elory Turner; Fred Sowerby; Lester Flax	4 × 400 m relay	—N/a		—N/a		3:10.45	7

Field events

Athlete	Event	Qualifying		Final	
Athlete	Event	Result	Rank	Result	Rank
Maxwell Peters	Triple jump	15.06	13	did not advance	
