= List of Antiguan and Barbudan records in athletics =

The following are the national records in athletics in Antigua and Barbuda maintained by the country's national athletics federation: Athletic Association of Antigua & Barbuda (ABAA).

== Outdoor ==
Key to tables: Awaiting ratification Record not kept by ABAA Not ratified or later rescinded by ABAA

=== Men ===
Event	Record	Athlete	Date	Meet	Place	Ref..
100 y	9.30+ (+1.1 m/s)	Daniel Bailey	31 May 2011	Golden Spike Ostrava	Ostrava, Czech Republic	
100 m	9.91 (−0.2 m/s)	Daniel Bailey	17 July 2009	Meeting Areva	Paris, France	
150 m (straight)	14.88 (+1.4 m/s)	Daniel Bailey	31 March 2013	Mano a Mano Challenge	Rio de Janeiro, Brazil	
200 m	19.88 (+1.2 m/s)	Miguel Francis	11 June 2016	Jamaica National Racer's Grand Prix	Kingston, Jamaica	
200 m	19.76 (−1.1 m/s)	Miguel Francis	28 June 2015		St. John's, Antigua and Barbuda	
200 m	19.67 (+0.4 m/s) (Note: uncertified track, nevertheless recognised by World Athletics)	Miguel Francis	10 July 2016	Antigua and Barbuda National Championships	St. John's, Antigua and Barbuda	
400 m	44.74	Rai Benjamin	21 April 2018	Mt. SAC Relays	Torrance, United States	
400 m	44.31	Rai Benjamin (Note: eligible to represent United States from October 2018)	20 April 2019	Mt. SAC Relays	Torrance, United States	
800 m	1:48.62	Dale Jones	25 August 1991	World Championships	Tokyo, Japan	
1500 m	3:49.41	Dale Jones	19 September 1988	Olympic Games	Seoul, South Korea	
3000 m	9:10.97	James Baird	31 March 2002	CARIFTA Games	Nassau, The Bahamas	
5000 m	15:13.4	Dale Jones	11 July 1988		Bridgetown, Barbados	
5000 m	14:41.39	William Richards	17 June 2000		Port of Spain, Trinidad and Tobago	
10,000 m	33:32.6	Tyrone Thibou	1986		Bridgetown, Barbados	
Marathon	2:31:49	Cordover Simon	28 August 1994	Commonwealth Games	Victoria, Canada	
110 m hurdles	14.07	Randy Gillon	6 May 2000		Iowa City, United States	
400 m hurdles	47.02	Rai Benjamin	8 June 2018	NCAA Division I Championships	Eugene, United States	
3000 m steeplechase	9:54.5	Tyrone Thibou	31 July 1982		Port of Spain, Trinidad and Tobago	
High jump	2.27 m	James Grayman	7 July 2007		Pergine Valsugana, Italy	
Pole vault	3.80 m	Calvin Greenaway	2 June 1973		Newham, United Kingdom	
Long jump	8.02 m	Lester Benjamin	12 May 1984		Baton Rouge, United States	
Triple jump	16.55 m	James Browne	12 April 1990		San Angelo, United States	
Shot put	15.87 m	Edward Byam	6 June 1969		Sennelager, West Germany	
Shot put	16.51 m	Christopher Johnson	19 February 2023	MEAC Championships	Virginia Beach, United States	
Discus throw	42.79 m	Henry Greaux	24 July 1960		Kingston, Jamaica	
Hammer throw	31.82 m	Lethan Nelson	8 April 2016		St. Louis, United States	
Javelin throw	65.70 m	Oraine Brown	6 July 2012	NACAC Under-23 Championships	Irapuato, Mexico	
Decathlon	6027 pts h	Calvin Greenaway	26–27 September 1970		London, United Kingdom	
Decathlon	100m / Long jump / Shot put / High jump / 400m / 110m H / Discus / Pole vault / Javelin / 1500m; 11.2 / 7.09 m / 11.65 m / 1.85 m / 54.7 / 16.9 / 23.30 m / 3.66 m / 48.20 m / 5:04.1					
20 km walk (road)						
50 km walk (road)						
4 × 100 m relay	38.01	Antigua and Barbuda; Chavaughn Walsh; Daniel Bailey; Jared Jarvis; Miguel Francis	29 August 2015	World Championships	Beijing, China	
4 × 200 m relay	1:24.33	Antigua and Barbuda; Daniel Bailey; Richard Richardson; Jared Jarvis; Chavaughn Walsh	23 April 2017	IAAF World Relays	Nassau, Bahamas	
4 × 400 m relay	3:09.46	Antigua and Barbuda; N'kosie Barnes; Michael Terry; Mitchell Browne; Howard Lindsay	2 August 1996	Olympic Games	Atlanta, United States	

=== Women ===
Event	Record	Athlete	Date	Meet	Place	Ref..
100 m	11.19 (+1.2 m/s)	Joella Lloyd	1 May 2021	Tennessee Challenge	Knoxville, United States	
100 m	11.08 (+0.4 m/s)	Joella Lloyd	9 June 2022	NCAA Division I Championships	Eugene, United States	
100 m	11.06 (+0.5 m/s)	Joella Lloyd	25 May 2024	NCAA East First Round	Lexington, United States	
200 m	23.20	Heather Samuel	22 May 1994		Atlanta, United States	
200 m	22.66 (−0.2 m/s)	Joella Lloyd	9 June 2022	NCAA Division I Championships	Eugene, United States	
400 m	52.49	Afia Charles	12 May 2013	Conference USA Championships	Houston, United States	
800 m	2:06.36	Charmaine Thomas	13 May 1995		Bloomington, United States	
1500 m	4:27.51	Janil Williams	19 July 2000		Montreal, Canada	
3000 m	9:49.89	Janil Williams	10 May 1998	CARIFTA Games	Port of Spain, Trinidad and Tobago	
5000 m	16:56.42	Janil Williams	11 August 2000		Victoria, Canada	
10,000 m						
Marathon						
100 m hurdles	15.77	Elma Camacho	10 May 2009		Murfreesboro, United States	
400 m hurdles	1:02.21	Barbara Selkridge	6 August 1988		Syracuse, United States	
3000 m steeplechase						
High jump	1.91 m	Priscilla Frederick	22 July 2015	Pan American Games	Toronto, Canada	
Pole vault						
Long jump	6.22 m	Amy Harris-Willock	6 July 2014		Basseterre, Saint Kitts and Nevis	
Triple jump	11.35 m (−0.5 m/s)	Janicia Charles	10 May 2003		Orlando, United States	
Triple jump	12.30 m (−0.3 m/s)	Alyssa Dyett	20 May 2023	NJCAA Division I Championships	Hobbs, United States	
Shot put	17.32 m	Jess St. John	13 April 2018	Commonwealth Games	Gold Coast, Australia	
Discus throw	43.84 m A	Jess St. John	26 March 2016		El Paso, United States	
Hammer throw	59.28 m	Althea Renee Charles	2 April 2011	Ramapo College Roadrunner Invitational	Mahwah, United States	
Javelin throw	41.11 m	Amanda Edwards	9 April 2007	CARIFTA Games	Providenciales, Turks and Caicos Islands	
Heptathlon	3683 pts	Elma Camacho	8–9 May 2009		Murfreesboro, United States	
Heptathlon	100m H / High jump / Shot put / 200m / Long jump / Javelin / 800m; 15.78 / 1.39 m / 9.34 m / 27.47w / 4.82 m / 23.50 m / 2:54.65					
20 km walk (road)						
50 km walk (road)						
4 × 100 m relay	46.22	Antigua and Barbuda; Chandora Codrington; Heather Samuel; Anika Jno Baptiste; Sonia Williams	2 May 2004		Port of Spain, Trinidad and Tobago	
4 × 400 m relay	3:39.32	Antigua and Barbuda; Joycelyn Joseph; Ruperta Charles; Monica Stevens; Laverne Bryan	10 August 1984	Olympic Games	Los Angeles, United States	

=== Mixed ===
Event	Record	Athlete	Date	Meet	Place	Ref.
4 × 400 m relay	3:42.18	Antigua and Barbuda; Osei Gardner; Geolyna Dowdye; Tyra Fenton; Cleon Joseph	31 March 2024	CARIFTA Games	St. George's, Grenada	

== Indoor ==
=== Men ===
Event	Record	Athlete	Date	Meet	Place	Ref..
50 m	5.75	Daniel Bailey	28 January 2011	U.S. Open Track and Field	New York City, United States	
60 m	6.54 (heat)	Daniel Bailey	21 February 2009	Aviva Indoor Grand Prix	Birmingham, United Kingdom	
60 m	6.54 (final)	Daniel Bailey	21 February 2009	Aviva Indoor Grand Prix	Birmingham, United Kingdom	
60 m	6.54	Daniel Bailey	6 February 2010	Boston Indoor Games	Boston, United States	
200 m	20.34	Rai Benjamin	10 March 2018	NCAA Division I Championships	College Station, United States	
300 m	33.17	Rai Benjamin	31 January 2015	Armory Track Invitational	New York City, United States	
400 m	46.59	Rai Benjamin	14 March 2015	USA Nationals	New York City, United States	
800 m	1:54.56	Dale Jones	6 March 1987	World Championships	Indianapolis, United States	
1500 m	4:04.14	Dale Jones	6 March 1987	World Championships	Indianapolis, United States	
Mile	4:15.54	Eliott Mason	8 February 2002		New York City, United States	
3000 m						
60 m hurdles	8.03	Randy Gillon	21 February 1999		Madison, United States	
High jump	2.24 m	James Grayman	21 February 2010	Belgian Championships	Ghent, Belgium	
Pole vault						
Long jump	7.92 m	Lester Benjamin	21 January 1988		Johnson City, United States	
Triple jump	16.23 m	James Browne	27 January 1990		Lubbock, United States	
Shot put						
Heptathlon						
Heptathlon	60m / Long jump / Shot put / High jump / 60m H / Pole vault / 1000m					
5000 m walk						
4 × 400 m relay						

=== Women ===
Event	Record	Athlete	Date	Meet	Place	Ref..
60 m	7.15	Joella Lloyd	27 February 2021	SEC Championships	Fayetteville, United States	
200 m	23.39	Joella Lloyd	26 February 2021	SEC Championships	Fayetteville, United States	
200 m	23.38	Joella Lloyd	28 January 2023	Bob Pollock Invitational	Clemson, United States	
300 m	37.64	Samantha Edwards	18 January 2014	Hampton Invitational	Hampton, United States	
400 m	53.01	Samantha Edwards	12 February 2016	David Hemery Valentine Invitatonal	Boston, United States	
800 m						
1500 m						
3000 m						
60 m hurdles	10.06	Elma Camacho	13 February 2009		Clemson, United States	
High jump	1.87 m	Priscilla Frederick	24 January 2015	Tiger Open	Princeton, United States	
Pole vault						
Long jump						
Triple jump	12.39 m	Junise Sheppard	3 February 2024	Ogólnopolskie halowe zawody lekkoatletyczne	Toruń, Poland	
Shot put	14.63 m	Jess St. John	13 February 2015	Mid-Eastern Championships	Landover, United States	
Weight throw	18.45 m	Althea Renee Charles	23 January 2011	Greater Boston Track Club Invitational	Boston, United States	
Pentathlon						
Pentathlon	60m H / High jump / Shot put / Long jump / 800m					
3000 m walk						
4 × 400 m relay						
