= 2015 World Championships in Athletics – Men's 4 × 100 metres relay =

Men's 4 × 100 metres relay at the 2015 World Championships
- Venue: Beijing National Stadium
- Dates: 29 August (heats & final)
- Competitors: 58 from 14 nations
- Winning time: 37.36

Medalists
gold medal	Nesta Carter; Asafa Powell; Nickel Ashmeade; Usain Bolt; Rasheed Dwyer*	Jamaica
silver medal	Mo Youxue; Xie Zhenye; Su Bingtian; Zhang Peimeng	China
bronze medal	Aaron Brown; Andre De Grasse; Brendon Rodney; Justyn Warner	Canada

The men's 4 × 100 metres relay at the 2015 World Championships in Athletics was held at the Beijing National Stadium on 29 August.

== Summary ==
=== Heats ===
Jamaica ran Rasheed Dwyer to rest Usain Bolt in the heats. The United States employed a rare strategy of running the main team and not resting any runners.

The US won the first heat with Great Britain second while resting Chijindu Ujah. Jamaica won the second heat. China set an Asian Continental Record in their heat.

=== Final race ===
The United States managed a clean handoff two times between Trayvon Bromell, Justin Gatlin and Tyson Gay, while Jamaica stiff between Nesta Carter and Asafa Powell. Around the final turn, Nickel Ashmeade made up ground on Gay. The final baton change between Mike Rodgers and Tyson Gay was completed outside the changeover zone and the American team was disqualified.

Jamaica won, with China second and Canada third. Britain did not finish after failing to complete the final baton change.

== Records ==
Prior to the competition, the records were as follows:

World record	Jamaica (Nesta Carter, Michael Frater, Yohan Blake, Usain Bolt)	36.84	London, Great Britain	11 August 2012
Championship record	Jamaica (Nesta Carter, Michael Frater, Yohan Blake, Usain Bolt)	37.04	Daegu, South Korea	4 September 2011
World Leading	United States (Mike Rodgers, Justin Gatlin, Tyson Gay, Ryan Bailey)	37.38	Nassau, Bahamas	2 May 2015
African Record	Nigeria (Osmond Ezinwa, Olapade Adeniken, Francis Obikwelu, Davidson Ezinwa)	37.94	Athens, Greece	9 August 1997
Asian Record	China (Chen Shiwei, Xie Zhenye, Su Bingtian, Zhang Peimeng)	37.99	Incheon, South Korea	29 August 2014
North, Central American and Caribbean record	Jamaica (Nesta Carter, Michael Frater, Yohan Blake, Usain Bolt)	36.84	London, Great Britain	11 August 2012
South American Record	Brazil (Vicente de Lima, Édson Ribeiro, André da Silva, Claudinei da Silva)	37.90	Sydney, Australia	30 September 2000
European Record	Great Britain (Jason Gardener, Darren Campbell, Marlon Devonish, Dwain Chambers)	37.73	Sevilla, Spain	29 August 1999
Oceanian record	Australia (Paul Henderson, Tim Jackson, Steve Brimacombe, Damien Marsh)	38.17	Gothenburg, Sweden	12 August 1995
Oceanian record	Australia (Anthony Alozie, Isaac Ntiamoah, Andrew McCabe, Josh Ross)	38.17	London, Great Britain	10 August 2012
The following records were established during the competition:
Asian Record	China (Mo Youxue, Xie Zhenye, Su Bingtian, Zhang Peimeng)	37.92	Beijing, China	29 August 2015
World Leading	Jamaica (Nesta Carter, Asafa Powell, Nickel Ashmeade, Usain Bolt)	37.36	Beijing, China	29 August 2015

== Qualification standards ==
Entry standards
Top 8 at IWR+ 8 from Top Lists

== Schedule ==
Date	Time	Round
29 August 2015	12:20	Heats
29 August 2015	21:10	Final

All times are local times (UTC+8)

== Results ==
=== Heats ===
Qualification: First 3 of each heat (Q) plus the 2 fastest times (q) advance to the final.

Rank	Heat	Lane	Nation	Athletes	Time	Notes
1	2	4	Jamaica	Nesta Carter, Asafa Powell, Rasheed Dwyer, Nickel Ashmeade	37.41	Q, SB
2	2	6	France	Emmanuel Biron, Christophe Lemaitre, Guy-Elphège Anouman, Jimmy Vicaut	37.88	Q, SB
3	1	8	United States	Trayvon Bromell, Justin Gatlin, Tyson Gay, Mike Rodgers	37.91	Q
4	2	8	China	Mo Youxue, Xie Zhenye, Su Bingtian, Zhang Peimeng	37.92	Q, AR
5	2	7	Antigua and Barbuda	Chavaughn Walsh, Daniel Bailey, Jared Jarvis, Miguel Francis	38.01	q, NR
6	2	9	Canada	Justyn Warner, Andre De Grasse, Brendon Rodney, Aaron Brown	38.03	q, SB
7	1	9	Great Britain & N.I.	Richard Kilty, Harry Aikines-Aryeetey, James Ellington, Daniel Talbot	38.20	Q, SB
8	2	5	Netherlands	Solomon Bockarie, Patrick van Luijk, Liemarvin Bonevacia, Hensley Paulina	38.41	SB
9	1	5	Germany	Julian Reus, Sven Knipphals, Alexander Kosenkow, Aleixo-Platini Menga	38.57	Q
10	1	7	Japan	Kazuma Ōseto, Kenji Fujimitsu, Takuya Nagata, Kotaro Taniguchi	38.60	
11	1	3	Ukraine	Roman Kravtsov, Serhiy Smelyk, Volodymyr Suprun, Vitaliy Korzh	38.79	SB
12	1	6	Bahamas	Warren Fraser, Shavez Hart, Elroy McBride, Teray Smith	38.96	SB
	1	4	Brazil	Gustavo dos Santos, Aldemir da Silva Junior, Bruno de Barros, José Carlos Moreira	DNF	
	2	3	South Africa	Henricho Bruintjies, Anaso Jobodwana, Antonio Alkana, Akani Simbine	DNF	

=== Final ===
The final was started at 21:10.

Rank	Lane	Nation	Athletes	Time	Notes
1st place, gold medalist(s)	4	Jamaica	Nesta Carter, Asafa Powell, Nickel Ashmeade, Usain Bolt	37.36	WL
2nd place, silver medalist(s)	9	China	Mo Youxue, Xie Zhenye, Su Bingtian, Zhang Peimeng	38.01	
3rd place, bronze medalist(s)	3	Canada	Aaron Brown, Andre De Grasse, Brendon Rodney, Justyn Warner	38.13	
4	8	Germany	Julian Reus, Sven Knipphals, Alexander Kosenkow, Aleixo-Platini Menga	38.15	SB
5	5	France	Emmanuel Biron, Christophe Lemaitre, Guy-Elphège Anouman, Jimmy Vicaut	38.23	
6	2	Antigua and Barbuda	Chavaughn Walsh, Daniel Bailey, Jared Jarvis, Miguel Francis	38.61	
	7	Great Britain & N.I.	Richard Kilty, Daniel Talbot, James Ellington, Chijindu Ujah	DNF	
	6	United States	Trayvon Bromell, Justin Gatlin, Tyson Gay, Mike Rodgers	DQ (37.77)	R170.7
