= Antigua and Barbuda at the 2026 Commonwealth Games =

- Flag of Antigua and Barbuda
- CG code: ANT
- CGA: Antigua and Barbuda Commonwealth Games Association
- Website: antiguabarbudanoc.com

in Glasgow, Scotland 23 July 2026 – 2 August 2026
- Competitors: 12 in 4 sports
- Flag bearer: Alston Ryan
- Baton bearer: Aunjulique Liddie
- Medals: Gold 0 Silver 0 Bronze 0 Total 0

Commonwealth Games appearances (overview)
- 1966; 1970; 1974; 1978; 1982–1990; 1994; 1998; 2002; 2006; 2010; 2014; 2018; 2022; 2026; 2030

Antigua and Barbuda competed at the 2026 Commonwealth Games in Glasgow, Scotland. This marked Antigua and Barbuda's 12th participation at the games, after making its debut at the 1966 Commonwealth Games.

The King's Baton relay stopped in Antigua and Barbuda in April 2025.

The Antigua and Barbudan team competed in four sports: Athletics, boxing, track cycling and swimming and consisted of 12 athletes (eight men and four women). Boxer Alston Ryan was the country's flagbearer during the opening ceremony. Meanwhile, swimmer Aunjulique Liddie was the baton bearer during the opening ceremony.

== Competitors ==
The following is the list of number of competitors participating at the Games per sport/discipline.

Sport	Men	Women	Total
Athletics	3	2	5
Boxing	2	0	2
Swimming	2	2	4
Track cycling	1	0	1
Total	8	4	12

== Athletics ==
Antigua and Barbuda entered five track and field athletes (three men and two women).

Key

- Q = Qualified for the next round
- q = Qualified for the next round as a fastest loser or, in field events, by position without achieving the qualifying target

Track events

Athlete	Event	Heat		Semifinal		Final	
Athlete	Event	Result	Rank	Result	Rank	Result	Rank
Dwayne Fleming	Men's 100 metres	10.83	4	Did not advance			
Cejhae Greene	Men's 100 metres	10.12	1 q	10.19	6	Did not advance	
Soniya Jones	Women's 100 metres	11.56	3	Did not advance			
Geolyna Dowdye	Women's 100 metres	11.28	2 q	11.45	7	Did not advance	
Geolyna Dowdye	Women's 200 metres	DNS		Did not advance			

Field events

Athlete	Event	Qualification		Final	
Athlete	Event	Distance	Rank	Distance	Rank
Christopher Johnson	Men's shot put	14.79	13	Did not advance	

== Boxing ==
Antigua and Barbuda entered two male boxers.

Men

Athlete	Event	Round of 32	Round of 16	Quarterfinals	Semifinals	Final	
Athlete	Event	Opposition Result	Opposition Result	Opposition Result	Opposition Result	Opposition Result	Rank
Alston Ryan	65 kg	Bonzo (MAW); L RSC	Did not advance				
Zalaan Jan	80 kg	Ngwira (MAW); W RSC	Panghal (IND); L 0–5	Did not advance			

== Swimming ==
Antigua and Barbuda entered four swimmers (two men and two women).

Athlete	Event	Heat		Semifinal		Final	
Athlete	Event	Time	Rank	Time	Rank	Time	Rank
Jadon Wuilliez	Men's 50 m freestyle	23.70	27	Did not Advance			
Jadon Wuilliez	Men's 50 m breaststroke	27.69	10 Q	28.01	12	Did not Advance	
Jadon Wuilliez	Men's 100 m breaststroke	1:02.81	18	Did not Advance			
Ethan Stubbs-Green	Men's 100 m freestyle	52.31	35	Did not Advance			
Ethan Stubbs-Green	Men's 200 m freestyle	1:55.32	26	Did not Advance			
Ethan Stubbs-Green	Men's 100 m butterfly	55.54	22	Did not Advance			
Ethan Stubbs-Green	Men's 200 m butterfly	2:04.62	13	Did not Advance			
Aunjulique Liddie	Women's 50 m freestyle	28.78	54	Did not Advance			
Aunjulique Liddie	Women's 100 m freestyle	1:03.92	57	Did not Advance			
Aunjulique Liddie	Women's 50 m butterFly	31.67	46	Did not Advance			
Bianca Mitchell	Women's 50 m freestyle	27.83	45	Did not Advance			
Bianca Mitchell	Women's 100 m freestyle	1:00.66	39	Did not Advance			

== Track Cycling ==
Antigua and Barbuda entered one male track cyclist.

Elimination race

Athlete	Event	Final
Athlete	Event	Rank
Atiba Quildan	Men's elimination race	DNS

Sprint

Athlete	Event	Qualification		Round 1	Quarterfinals	Semifinals	Final	
Athlete	Event	Time	Rank	Opposition Time	Opposition Time	Opposition Time	Opposition Time	Rank
Atiba Quildan	Men's sprint	11.310	26	Did not advance				

Keirin

Athlete	Event	1st Round	Repechage	Semifinals	Final
Athlete	Event	Rank	Rank	Rank	Rank
Atiba Quildan	Men's keirin	6 R	5	Did not advance	

Time trial

Athlete	Event	Time	Rank
Atiba Quildan	Men's time trial	1:07.011	21
