= Swimming at the 2018 Commonwealth Games – Men's 200 metre individual medley =

Men's 200 metre individual medley at the 2018 Commonwealth Games
- Venue: Gold Coast Aquatic Centre
- Dates: 10 April
- Competitors: 24 from 14 nations
- Winning time: 1:57.67

Medalists
gold medal	Mitch Larkin	Australia
silver medal	Duncan Scott	Scotland
bronze medal	Clyde Lewis	Australia

The men's 200 metre individual medley event at the 2018 Commonwealth Games was held on 10 April at the Gold Coast Aquatic Centre.

== Records ==
Prior to this competition, the existing world, Commonwealth and Games records were as follows:

World record	Ryan Lochte (USA)	1:54.00	Shanghai, China	28 July 2011
Commonwealth record	Max Litchfield (GBR)	1:56.64	Budapest, Hungary	26 July 2017
Games record	Daniel Tranter (AUS)	1:57.83	Glasgow, United Kingdom	29 July 2014

The following records were established during the competition:

Date	Event	Name	Nationality	Time	Record
10 April	Final	Mitch Larkin	Australia	1:57.67	GR

== Results ==
=== Heats ===
The heats were held at 11:13.

Rank	Heat	Lane	Name	Nation	Result	Notes
1	3	5	Mitch Larkin	Australia	1:59.02	Q
2	3	4	Clyde Lewis	Australia	1:59.50	Q
3	3	6	Daniel Wallace	Scotland	2:00.21	Q
4	1	4	Duncan Scott	Scotland	2:00.44	Q
5	2	5	Bradlee Ashby	New Zealand	2:00.57	Q
6	2	4	Mark Szaranek	Scotland	2:00.58	Q
7	1	5	Xavier Castelli	Wales	2:00.97	Q
8	1	2	Lewis Clareburt	New Zealand	2:01.33	Q
9	1	6	Mackenzie Darragh	Canada	2:01.67	
10	3	3	Joe Litchfield	England	2:01.78	
11	2	6	Jarryd Baxter	South Africa	2:02.23	
12	1	3	Travis Mahoney	Australia	2:02.30	
13	2	3	Jarvis Parkinson	England	2:02.85	
14	2	7	Tristan Cote	Canada	2:03.09	
15	3	2	Ayrton Sweeney	South Africa	2:03.19	
16	2	2	James Brown	Northern Ireland	2:03.34	
17	3	7	Eben Vorster	South Africa	2:07.11	
18	2	1	Jason Arthur	Ghana	2:07.44	
19	1	7	Brandon Schuster	Samoa	2:08.44	
20	3	1	Taichi Vakasama	Fiji	2:12.35	
21	3	8	Izaak Bastian	Bahamas	2:12.87	
22	1	1	Stefano Mitchell	Antigua and Barbuda	2:18.59	
23	2	8	Jadon Wuilliez	Antigua and Barbuda	2:19.95	
24	1	8	Samuele Rossi	Seychelles	2:21.10	

=== Final ===
The final was held at 20:15.

Rank	Lane	Name	Nation	Result	Notes
1st place, gold medalist(s)	4	Mitch Larkin	Australia	1:57.67	GR
2nd place, silver medalist(s)	6	Duncan Scott	Scotland	1:57.86	
3rd place, bronze medalist(s)	5	Clyde Lewis	Australia	1:58.18	
4	7	Mark Szaranek	Scotland	1:59.24	
5	2	Bradlee Ashby	New Zealand	1:59.59	
6	3	Daniel Wallace	Scotland	1:59.85	
7	8	Lewis Clareburt	New Zealand	2:01.13	
8	1	Xavier Castelli	Wales	2:01.49	
