= Antigua and Barbuda at the 1983 World Championships in Athletics =

- Flag of Antigua and Barbuda
- WA code: ANT

in Helsinki, Finland August 7–14, 1983
- Competitors: 2 (1 man and 1 woman) in 2 events
- Medals: Gold 0 Silver 0 Bronze 0 Total 0

World Championships in Athletics appearances
- 1983; 1987; 1991; 1993; 1995; 1997; 1999; 2001; 2003; 2005; 2007; 2009; 2011; 2013; 2015; 2017; 2019; 2022; 2023; 2025

Antigua and Barbuda competed at the 1983 World Championships in Athletics in Helsinki, Finland, which were held from 7 to 14 August 1983. The athlete delegation consisted of two athletes, sprinter Lester Benjamin and high jumper Iona Smith. Benjamin reached the quarterfinals of the men's 100 metres while Smith failed to make it past the qualifying round of the women's high jump.

== Background ==
The 1983 World Championships in Athletics were held at the Helsinki Olympic Stadium in Helsinki, Finland. Under the auspices of the International Amateur Athletics Federation, this was the first edition of the World Championships. It was held from 7 to 14 August 1983 and had 41 different events. Among the competing teams was the nation of Antigua and Barbuda. For this edition of the World Championships in Athletics, sprinter Lester Benjamin and high jumper Iona Smith competed for the nation.

== Men ==
Benjamin competed in the qualifying heats of the men's 100 metres on 7 August 1983 in the first heat against five other competitors. There, he recorded a time of 10.76 seconds and placed third, advancing further as he was in the top three of his heat. The quarterfinals were held the same day and he competed in the second heat against seven other competitors. There, he recorded a time of 10.86 seconds and placed last, failing to advance further to the semifinals as only the top four of each quarterfinals would only be able to do so.

Track and road events

Athlete	Event	Heat		Quarterfinal		Semifinal		Final	
Athlete	Event	Result	Rank	Result	Rank	Result	Rank	Result	Rank
Lester Benjamin	100 metres	10.76	3 Q	10.86	8	Did not advance			

== Women ==
Smith competed in the qualifying round of the women's high jump on 7 August 1983 in Group A against fifteen other competitors. There, her highest attempt achieved was at 1.50 metres. She placed last in the qualification group and failed to qualify for the finals as competitors who have reached the qualification standard of at least 1.90 metres or are within the top 8 of each qualification group would only be able to do so.

Field events

Athlete	Event	Qualification		Final	
Athlete	Event	Distance	Position	Distance	Position
Iona Smith	High jump	1.50	16	Did not advance	
