= Hayden Walsh Sr. =

Antiguan cricketer

Personal information
- Full name: Albert Costayne Hayden Walsh
- Born: 4 March 1963
- Died: 9 January 2010 (aged 46)
- Batting: Left-handed
- Bowling: Right-arm medium
- Role: Batsman
- Relatives: Vaughn Walsh (brother); Hayden Walsh Jr. (son); Tahir Walsh (son)

Domestic team information
- Years: Team
- 1988–1993: Leeward Islands
- Source: CricketArchive, 28 December 2015

Albert Costayne Hayden Walsh (4 March 1963 – 9 January 2010) was an Antiguan cricketer who represented the Leeward Islands in West Indian domestic competitions. He was a left-handed top-order batsman.

Walsh made his senior debut for Antigua and Barbuda in 1984. His first-class debut for the Leeward Islands did not come until February 1988, when he played against Jamaica in the 1987–88 Red Stripe Cup. Walsh established himself in the team the following season, also making his List A debut. However, he did not score a first-class half-century until the 1991–92 season, when he made 77 as an opening batsman against Jamaica.

The 1992–93 season was Walsh's last for the Leeward Islands, and also his most successful. He scored 408 runs from five matches, placing him fifth in the competition for runs and behind only Ridley Jacobs for the Leewards. Against Barbados, Walsh made twin half-centuries, including a career-best 92 in the first innings. He finished with a first-class career batting average of 28.36 from 18 matches. Aged 35, and after a gap of several years without a high-level appearance, Walsh was selected in Antigua and Barbuda's squad for the 1998 Commonwealth Games cricket tournament, where matches held List A status. Opening the batting against Canada, he scored 51, his only List A half-century.

After the conclusion of his playing career, Walsh established a cricket academy for young players. He was also involved in the administration of the game in Antigua. Walsh died in January 2010, having suffered an apparent heart attack while swimming in a hotel pool. His brother, Vaughn Walsh, and son, Hayden Walsh Jr., have both also played for the Leewards.

== See also ==
- List of Leeward Islands first-class cricketers
