= Ian Tittle =

West Indian cricketer (born 1973)

Ian Tittle (born 28 October 1973) is a West Indian cricket player. He represents the Leeward Islands and Antigua & Barbuda in West Indies domestic cricket. He also represented Antigua and Barbuda in the cricket tournament at the 1998 Commonwealth Games.
