= Dave Joseph =

West Indian cricketer (born 1969)

David Joseph
Personal information
- Born: 15 November 1969 (age 56); Antigua
- Batting: Right-handed

International information
- National side: West Indies
- Test debut: 5 March 1999 v Australia
- Last Test: 3 April 1999 v Australia

Career statistics
Competition	Test	First-class
Matches	4	58
Runs scored	141	2,587
Batting average	20.14	30.08
100s/50s	0/1	6/15
Top score	50	131
Catches/stumpings	10/–	63/–
- Source: CricInfo, 31 October 2022

David Rolston Emmanuel Joseph (born 15 November 1969) is a former West Indian international cricketer who played all of his four Test matches against touring Australia in 1999. His only 50 came in his maiden test innings when he scored 50 and shared 88 runs partnership for the third wicket with Brian Lara to take the score to 2–116 before West Indies were collapsed to 167 at Queen's Park Oval, Port of Spain, Trinidad. In the second innings, West Indies were all out for a humiliating 51.

He also captained Antigua and Barbuda in the cricket tournament at the 1998 Commonwealth Games.
