= Jared Jarvis =

Antigua and Barbuda sprinter

Personal information
- Born: 29 August 1994 (age 31) United States
- Weight: 68 kg (150 lb)

Sport
- Country: Antigua and Barbuda
- Sport: Track and field
- Event(s): 100 metres 4 × 100 metres relay

Jared Jarvis (born 29 August 1994) is an Antigua and Barbuda sprinter. He competed in the 4 × 100 metres relay event at the 2015 World Championships in Athletics in Beijing, China.
