= Miss Caribbean UK =

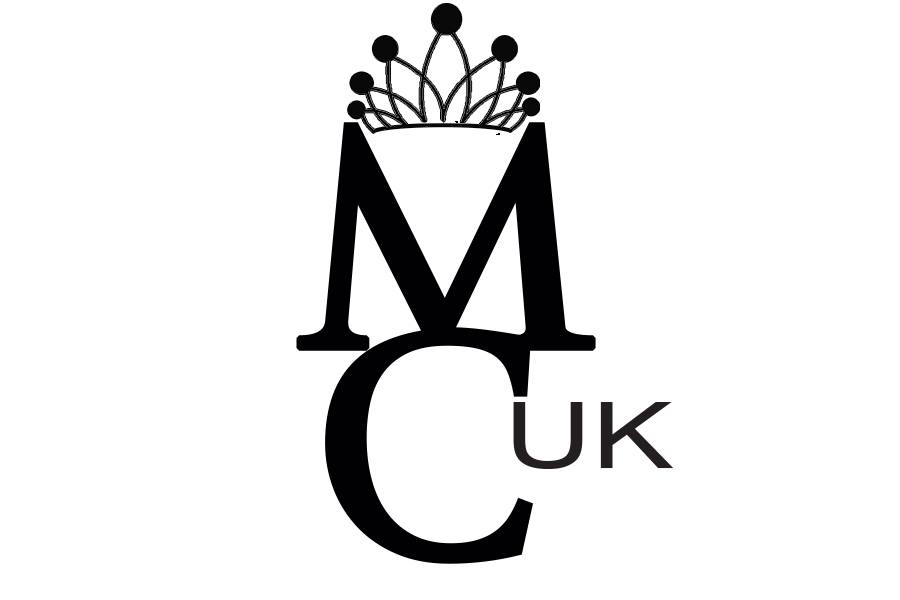
- Logo of the Miss Caribbean UK Pageant
- Formation: 2014
- Type: Beauty pageant
- Headquarters: London
- Location: United Kingdom
- Official language: English
- Founders: Clayton Brown; Jacqui Brown
- Key people: Dr Shaun Wallace; Kloe Dean; Jazmyn Raikes
- Website: misscaribbeanuk.com

Miss Caribbean UK is an Afro-Caribbean beauty pageant held in the United Kingdom. It was created by Clayton Brown and Jacqui Brown in 2014. The stated aims of the pageant are to promote, educate, inspire and celebrate the historical and cultural impact of the Caribbean within the United Kingdom. The organisation has adopted the slogan "Positively Promoting the Caribbean"™, aiming to inspire, inform and unite all the different Caribbean countries under one umbrella. The event uses a pageant to promote, educate, inspire and celebrate the historical and cultural impact of the Caribbean within the United Kingdom. The Patron is Barrister and TV personality Shaun Wallace.

The current Miss Caribbean UK titleholder is Zhané Fritz representing Grenada. She was crowned on 1 November 2025 at Shaw Theater, London.

== Miss Caribbean UK 2014 ==
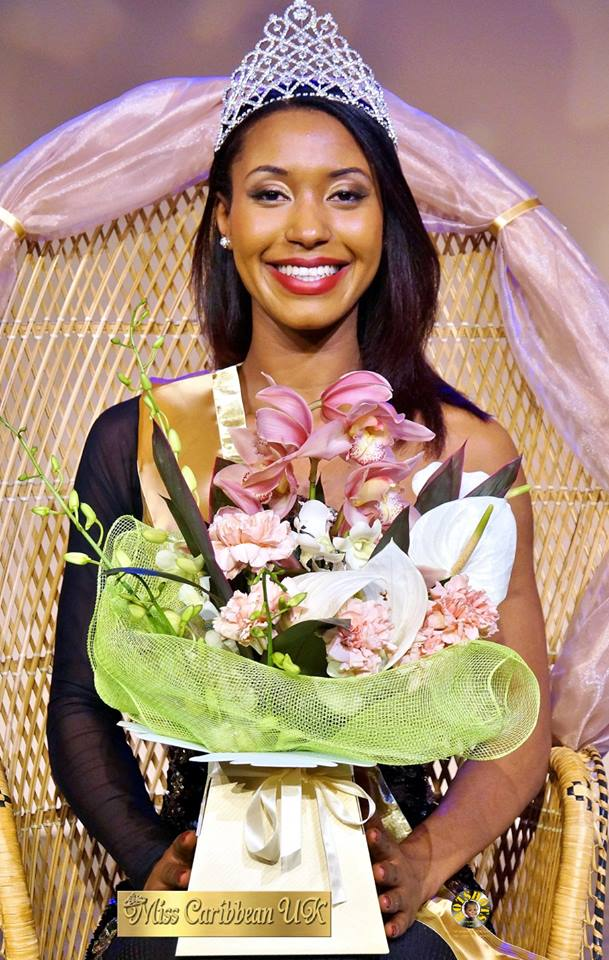
The first Miss Caribbean UK (2014) Miss Keeleigh Griffith representing Barbados

The first Miss Caribbean UK Grand Finalé was held on 30 November 2014 at the Tabernacle, Notting Hill. Eight contestants took part in four rounds including an introduction with Caribbean Carnival costumes, a swimwear round (which was removed the following year), an evening gown round and a round of interview questions. All evening gowns were designed by AgyeFrance.

=== Results ===
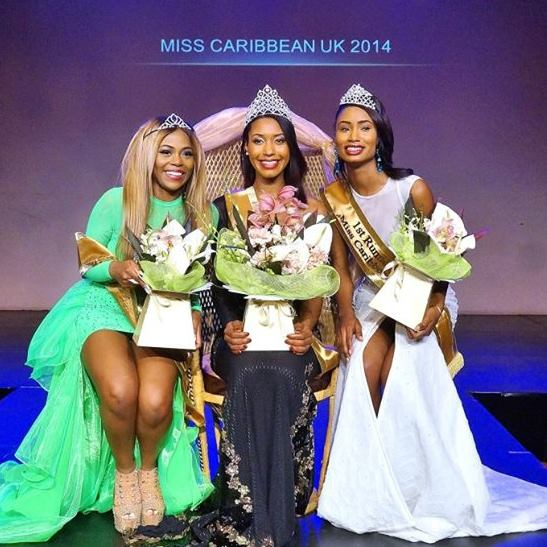
Ayesha Williams, Keeleigh Griffith & Kimhia Toussaint. All dresses by designer Francis Agyapong of AgyeFrance Design

==== Top Finalists ====
- Winner: Keeleigh Griffith, representing Barbados
- 1st Runner up: Kimhia Toussaint, representing Saint Lucia
- 2nd Runner up: Ayesha Williams, representing Jamaica

==== Category Winners ====
- Miss Website Queen: Ayesha Williams, representing Jamaica
- Miss Personality: Jamilah Faucher, representing Saint Lucia
- Miss Elegance: Rheanne Kimberley Murray, representing Jamaica
- Miss Swimwear: Kimhia Toussaint, representing Saint Lucia

== Miss Caribbean UK 2015 ==
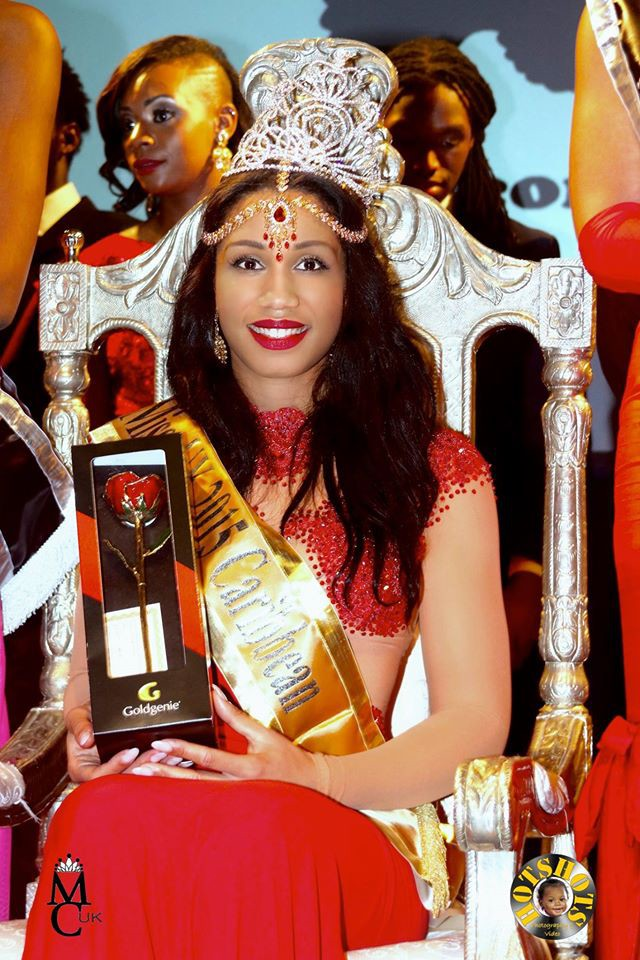
Miss Caribbean UK 2015 Miss Amy Harris-Willock representing Antigua

The second Miss Caribbean UK Grand Finalé was held on 5 December 2015 at the Shaw Theatre, London. Sixteen contestants took part in five rounds including an introduction in the form of a showcase in full Caribbean Carnival costumes, a traditional wear round (which replaced the swimwear round from the previous year), a cocktail dress round, an evening gown round and a round of interview questions.

=== Results ===
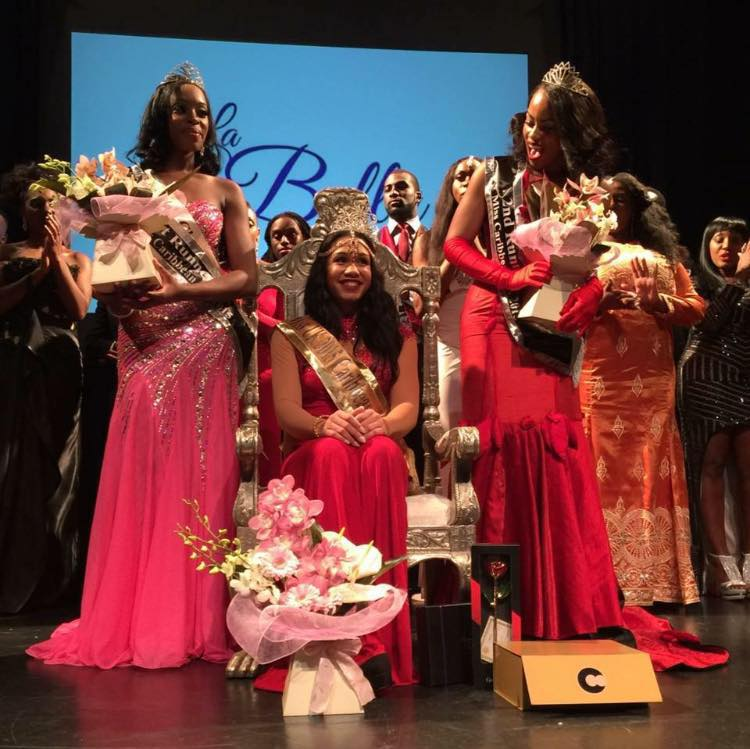
Selina Chippy, Amy Harris-Willock & Nicole Renwick. Amy's dress, which won best evening gown, is by designer Francis Agyapong of AgyeFrance Design

==== Top Finalists ====
- Winner: Amy Harris-Willock, representing Antigua
- 1st Runner up: Selina Chippy, representing Jamaica
- 2nd Runner up: Nicole Renwick, representing Jamaica

==== Category Winners ====
- People's Champion: Selina Chippy
- Miss Personality: Rochelle Barrett
- Best Evening Gown: Amy Harris-Willock

== Miss Caribbean UK 2016 ==
The third Miss Caribbean UK Grand Finalé was held on 3 December 2016 at the Broadway Theatre, Catford. Thirteen contestants showcased one of their many talents with a fantastic choreographed opening dance section, which had a surprise ending with the founders joining the girls onstage and dancing to a few bars of the "Electric Boogie". They also took part in an evening gown round and a round of interview questions.

=== Results ===
==== Top Finalists ====
- Winner: Jodie Hodgson, representing Barbados
- 1st Runner up: Tahmar Arayomi, representing Jamaica
- 2nd Runner up: Cheniel Henderson, representing Jamaica

==== Category Winners ====
- People's Champion: Miss Tanya Rose Brown
- Miss Personality: Atlanta Cousins-Robinson
- Best Evening Gown: Atlanta Cousins-Robinson

== Miss Caribbean UK 2017 ==
The fourth Miss Caribbean UK Grand Finalé was held on 25 November 2017 at the Broadway Theatre, Catford. Nine contestants competed for the Miss Caribbean crown at Broadway Theatre, with the show being choreographed by Kloe Dean.

=== Results ===
==== Top Finalists ====
- Winner: Elizabeth Williams, representing Grenada
- 1st Runner Up: Santrece Stewart, representing Jamaica
- 2nd Runner Up: Carissma Griffiths, representing Jamaica

==== Category Winners ====
- Best Evening Dress: Elizabeth Williams
- People’s Choice: Rianna Patterson
- Miss Personality: Eshiva Wright

NB: The title was assumed by the first Runner-Up; Miss Santrece Stewart

== Miss Caribbean UK 2018 ==
The fifth Miss Caribbean UK Grand Finalé was held on 24 November 2018 at the Greenwood Theatre, London Bridge. Eight contestants competed for the Miss Caribbean crown, and the show was choreographed by Kloe Dean. This year’s event, as with previous years, was very well attended, with a diverse audience from across the UK, who enjoyed a night of Caribbean culture and entertainment.

=== Results ===
==== Top Finalists ====
- Winner and new Miss Caribbean UK Queen: Tamera Farquharson-Ellis, representing St. Kitts and Nevis
- 1st Runner Up: Mosique Daly-Vidal, representing Dominica
- 2nd Runner Up: Tabitha Barnett representing Guyana

==== Category Winners ====
- Best Evening Dress: Tamera Farquharson-Ellis
- People’s Choice: Dhanitra Henry-Nangle
- Miss Personality: Tasha Lawson

== Miss Caribbean UK 2019 ==
The sixth Annual Miss Caribbean UK Grand Finalé was held on 9 November 2019, with twelve contestants competing. It was choreographed by Kloe Dean, and the show was held at the Greenwood theatre, London Bridge, a central location with greater accessibility from all locations.

=== Results ===
Top Finalists

- Winner and new Miss Caribbean UK Queen: Sydonie Barrett, representing The Cayman Islands
- 1st Runner Up: Deearnie Felix, representing Dominica
- 2nd Runner Up: Dale Joseph, representing St Lucia

Category Winners

- Best Evening Dress: Clarice Stewart
- People’s Choice: Sydonie Barrett
- Miss Personality: Rene Thompson

== Miss Caribbean UK 2020 ==
The seventh Annual Miss Caribbean UK Grand Finalé held on 28 November 2020 premiered online and was heavily impacted by the national lockdown caused by the Covid-19 Pandemic. Nine contestants competed for this annual Caribbean event. Following government restrictions, the show was held without an audience at The Tudor Rose, 68 The Green, Southall UB2 4BG.

=== Results ===
Top Finalists

- Winner and new Miss Caribbean UK Queen: Farrah Grant, representing Turks and Caicos Islands
- 1st Runner Up: Ashlea Smith, representing The Cayman Islands
- 2nd Runner Up: Gernice Haynes, representing Jamaica

Category Winners

- Best Evening Dress: Farrah Grant
- People’s Choice: Farrah Grant
- Miss Personality: Ashlea Smith

== Miss Caribbean UK 2022 ==
The eighth Miss Caribbean UK Grand Finalé was hosted on 29 October 2022 at the Shaw Theatre, London. This was the first in-person show since 2019, as the 2020 show was hosted online and no show occurred in 2021. Eight finalists competed for the winning title.

=== Results ===
Top Finalists

- Winner and new Miss Caribbean UK Queen: Samara Telesford, representing St. Vincent and the Grenadines
- 1st Runner Up: Odavia Moffat, representing Jamaica
- 2nd Runner up: Sarafina Mitchell, representing The Cayman Islands.

Category Winners

- Best Evening Dress: Samara Telesford
- People's Choice: Samara Telesford
- Miss Personality (tie): Samara Telesford, Gregiana Augustin
- Best Charity Fundraiser: Trishauna Stewart

== Miss Caribbean UK 2023 ==
The ninth Miss Caribbean UK Grand Finalé was hosted on 29 October 2023 at the Shaw Theatre, London.

=== Results ===
Top Finalists

- Winner and new Miss Caribbean UK Queen: Eshiva Wright, representing Jamaica
- 1st Runner Up: Huldah Deborah Williams, representing Dominica
- 2nd Runner Up: Ali Mai Joseph, representing Saint Lucia

Category Winners

- Best Evening Dress: Tierney Fauche
- People's Choice: Zahrah Catalaya Yvonne
- Miss Personality: Ella Greaves-King
- Best Charity Fundraiser: Zahrah Cat

== Miss Caribbean UK 2024 ==
The tenth Miss Caribbean UK Grand Finalé was hosted on 2 November 2024 at the Shaw Theatre, London.

=== Results ===
Top Finalists

- Winner and new Miss Caribbean UK Queen: Shakyrah Davis, representing Antigua and Barbuda
- 1st Runner Up: Carla-Mark Thompson, representing Aruba
- 2nd Runner Up: Layia Johnson, representing Jamaica

Category Winners

- Best Evening Dress: Shakyrah Davis
- People's Choice: Shakyrah Davis
- Best Charity Fundraiser: Shakyrah Davis

== Miss Caribbean UK 2025 ==
The eleventh Miss Caribbean UK Grand Finalé was hosted on 1 November 2025 at the Shaw Theatre, London and featured 11 finalists.

=== Results ===
Top Finalists

- Winner and new Miss Caribbean UK Queen: Zhané Fritz, representing Grenada and Jamaica
- 1st Runner Up: Tansy Daniel, representing St. Vincent and the Grenadines
- 2nd Runner Up: Aliyah Brown, representing Trinidad and Tobago
