= Jyme Bridges =

Antiguan racing cyclist

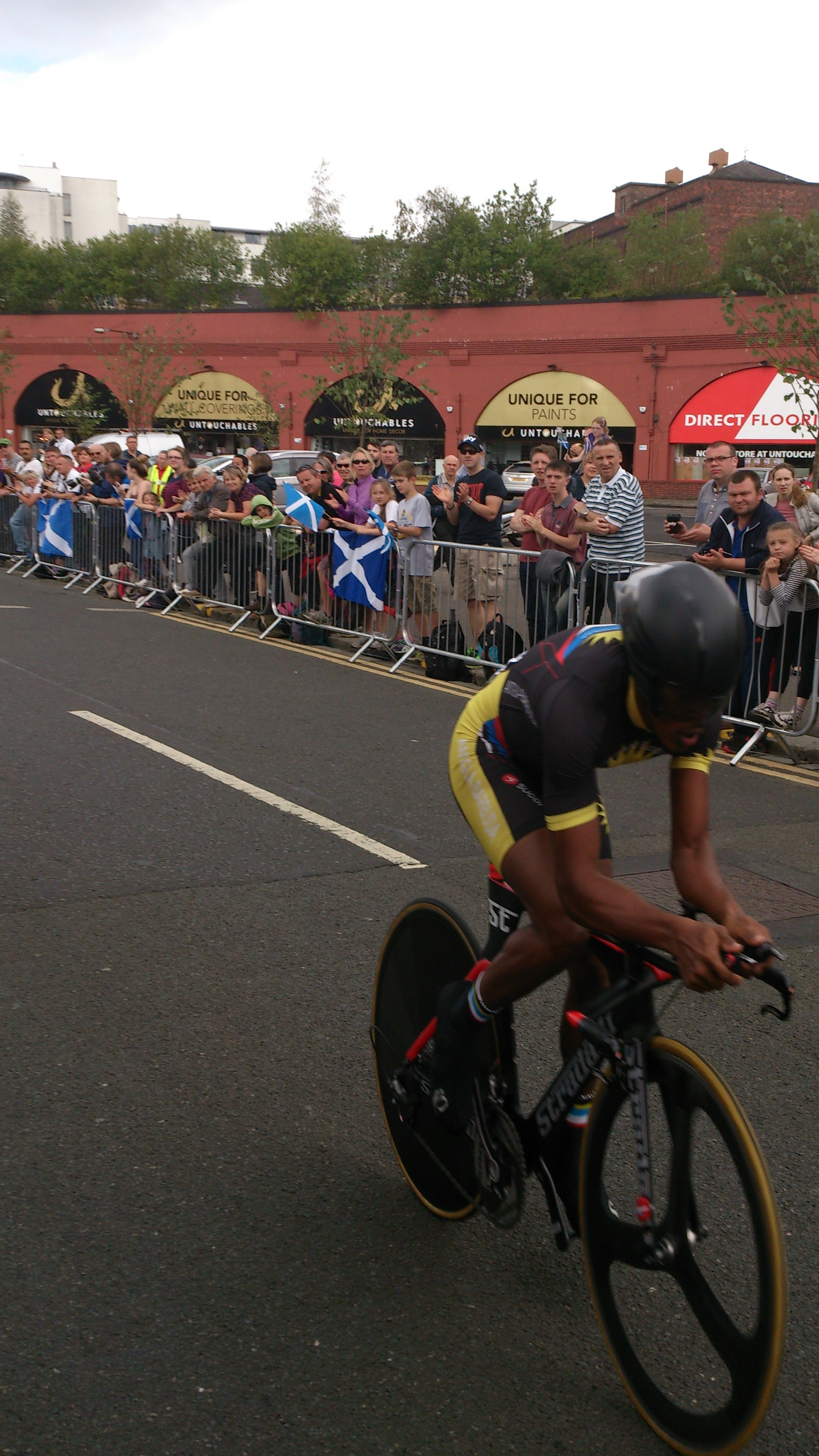
- Bridges at the 2014 Commonwealth Games

Personal information
- Full name: Jyme Bridges Jr.
- Born: 22 August 1989 (age 37)

Cycling career
- Sport: Cycling
- Disciplines: Road; Track
- Role: Rider

Amateur teams
- 2015–2016: Team Drive Phase Sport
- 2018–2019: Team DPS
- 2024: Albiono Pro Cycling

Professional team
- 2025: Albiono Pro Cycling

Jyme Bridges Jr. (born 22 August 1989) is an Antiguan racing cyclist, who has competed for his country at four Commonwealth Games between 2010 and 2022.

== Major results ==
2007
3rd Road race, National Road Championships
2008
1st Road race, National Road Championships
2009
National Road Championships

1st Road race
2nd Time trial

2010
2nd Time trial, National Road Championships
2011
National Road Championships

1st Road race
1st Under-23 road race

2012
National Road Championships

1st Road race
3rd Time trial

2013
1st Time trial, National Road Championships
2014
National Road Championships

1st Road race
3rd Time trial

2015
1st Road race, National Road Championships
2016
4th Road race, National Road Championships
2018
National Road Championships

1st Road race
3rd Time trial

2022
1st Road race, National Road Championships
2023
National Road Championships

1st Road race
3rd Time trial

2024
National Road Championships

1st Road race
2nd Time trial
