= Amy Harris-Willock =

English long jumper

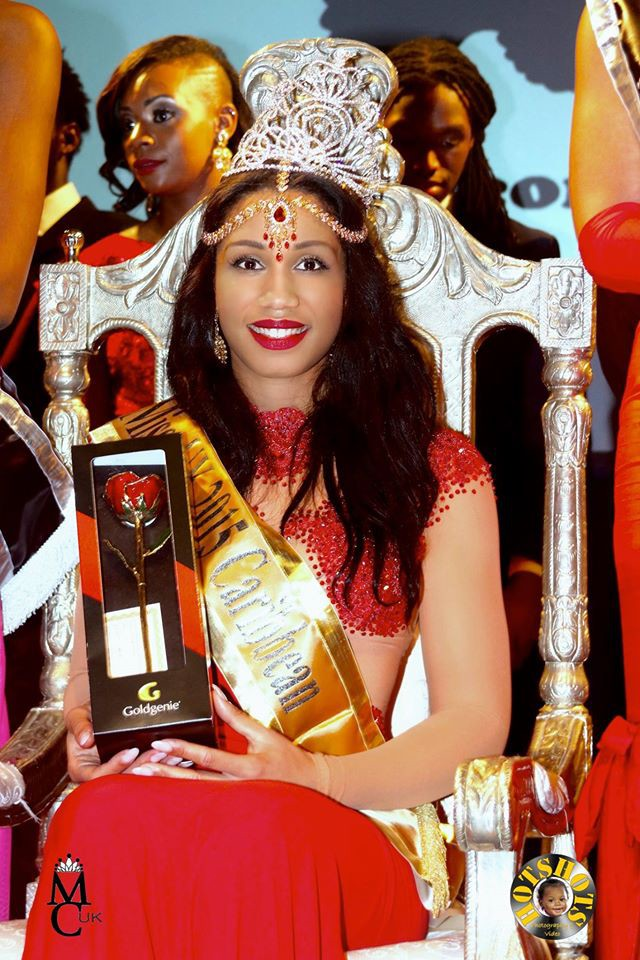
Amy Harris-Willock as Miss Caribbean UK 2015

Amy Melissa Harris-Willock (born 14 September 1987 in Birmingham) is an English long jumper of Antiguan descent competing as Amy Harris, and a former titleholder of the pageant Miss Caribbean UK.

== Athletics career ==
Competing under her birth name Amy Harris and a member of UK Athletics, she won the long jump gold medal at the 2004 Commonwealth Youth Games in Bendigo, Victoria with a jump of 6.19 m (20.3 ft) and silver at the 2005 European Athletics Junior Championships in Kaunas, Lithuania with a personal best jump of 6.35 m (20.8 ft).

She was holder of the England Athletics Championship outdoors under-20 women's long jump record 2006–12 with a jump of 6.40 m (21.0 ft) made while she was competing for Birchfield Harriers athletics club.

Harris attended courses at Florida State University 2008–12 during which time she competed both for the Florida State Seminoles and Birchfield Harriers. In 2010, she won silver at the UK championships in Birmingham and gold at the England Track and Field Championships in Gateshead.

She was Atlantic Coast Conference champion in both outdoor and indoor long jump for 2012 and made the fourth best ever long jump at Florida State with 21 ft 1.25 in (6.43 m).

In 2014 Harris, whose grandfather Etel Nathaniel Willock lived in Bolans until his death in 2010, transferred her allegiance to Antigua and Barbuda in recognition of her heritage and is a member of the Antigua & Barbuda Athletic Association. She is the national record holder for the long jump. She competed in the 2014 Commonwealth Games long jump.

== Miss Caribbean UK 2015 ==
Amy Harris-Willock competed and won the 2015 edition of Miss Caribbean UK. She was selected from four finalists in the Birmingham heat of the pageant competition on 25 July 2015. She then went on to join sixteen other hopefuls from around the United Kingdom and was placed as one of the seven who made it through to the final round at the Grand Finalé on 5 December at the Shaw Theatre.

She won best evening gown in her red bespoke tailored dress designed exclusively for her by Francis Agyapong of AgyeFrance Design. She was then announced the 2015 winner of the entire competition.
