= Tahir Walsh =

Antigua and Barbuda sprinter

Personal information
- Full name: Tahir Jelani Walsh
- Nationality: Antigua and Barbuda
- Born: 24 February 1994 (age 32)
- Home town: St. John's, Antigua and Barbuda
- Height: 1.82 m (6 ft 0 in)
- Weight: 83 kg (183 lb)

Sport
- Sport: Running
- Events: 100 metres, 200 metres

Achievements and titles
- Personal bests: 100 m: 10.16 (Miami, Florida 2021); 200 m: 20.84 (El Paso 2017)
Medal record
Men's athletics
Representing Antigua and Barbuda
CARIFTA Games (Junior)
Bronze medal – third place	2013 Nassau	100 m
Commonwealth Youth Games
Gold medal – first place	2011 Douglas	100 m
Silver medal – second place	2011 Douglas	200 m
CAC Junior Championships (Youth)
Bronze medal – third place	2010 Santo Domingo	200 m
CARIFTA Games (Youth)
Bronze medal – third place	2010 George Town	100 m

Tahir Jelani Walsh (born 24 February 1994) is an Antiguan sprinter. He finished fourth in the boys' 100 metres at the 2010 Summer Youth Olympics. At the 2016 Summer Olympics in Rio de Janeiro, he competed as a member of the men's 4 × 100 m relay team. The team finished 6th in their heat with a season's best time of 38.44 seconds, but did not qualify for the final.
