= Antigua & Barbuda Athletic Association =

Governing body for athletics in Antigua and Barbuda

- Sport: Athletics
- Jurisdiction: Association
- Abbreviation: ABAA
- Founded: 1960
- Affiliation: IAAF
- Affiliation date: 1966
- Regional affiliation: NACAC
- Headquarters: St. John's
- President: Rodney Williams
- Vice president: Everton Cornelius
- Secretary: Leslie Williams
- (Antigua and Barbuda)

The Antigua & Barbuda Athletic Association (ABAA) is the governing body for the sport of athletics in Antigua and Barbuda. Current president is Rodney Williams.

== History ==
ABAA was founded in 1960, and was affiliated to the IAAF in 1966.

== Affiliations ==
ABAA is the national member federation for Antigua and Barbuda in the following international organisations:

- International Association of Athletics Federations (IAAF)
- North American, Central American and Caribbean Athletic Association (NACAC)
- Association of Panamerican Athletics (APA)
- Central American and Caribbean Athletic Confederation (CACAC)
- Leeward Islands Athletics Association (LIAA)

Moreover, it is part of the following national organisations:

- Antigua and Barbuda Olympic Association (ABOA)

== National records ==
ABAA maintains the Antiguan and Barbudan records in athletics.
