= Chavaughn Walsh =

Antigua and Barbuda sprinter

Personal information
- Full name: Chavaughn Camarley Walsh
- Born: 29 December 1987 (age 38) St. John's, Antigua and Barbuda
- Height: 1.80 m (5 ft 11 in)
- Weight: 72 kg (159 lb)

Sport
- Sport: Track and field
- Events: 100 m, 200 m

Chavaughn Camarley Walsh (born 29 December 1987) is an Antigua and Barbuda sprinter. He competed in the 4 × 100 metres relay event at the 2015 World Championships in Beijing finishing sixth in the final.

== International competitions ==
Year	Competition	Venue	Position	Event	Notes
Representing Antigua and Barbuda
2013	Central American and Caribbean Championships	Morelia, Mexico	18th (h)	100 m	10.54
2013	Central American and Caribbean Championships	Morelia, Mexico	23rd (h)	200 m	22.08
2014	Commonwealth Games	Glasgow, United Kingdom	50th (h)	100 m	10.88
2015	IAAF World Relays	Nassau, Bahamas	6th (B)	4 × 100 m relay	39.25
2015	Pan American Games	Toronto, Canada	1st (h)	4 × 100 m relay	38.14^{1}
2015	World Championships	Beijing, China	6th	4 × 100 m relay	38.61
2016	World Indoor Championships	Portland, United States	13th (sf)	60 m	6.61
2016	Olympic Games	Rio de Janeiro, Brazil	12th (h)	4 × 100 m relay	38.44
2017	IAAF World Relays	Nassau, Bahamas	–	4 × 100 m relay	DNF
2017	IAAF World Relays	Nassau, Bahamas	8th (h)	4 × 200 m relay	1:24.33
2017	World Championships	London, United Kingdom	11th (p)	100 m	10.44

^{1}Disqualified in the final

== Personal bests ==
Outdoor

- 100 metres – 10.22 (+1.8 m/s, San Marcos 2015)
- 200 metres – 20.85 (-0.1 m/s, Houston 2015)

Indoor

- 60 metres – 6.59 (Houston 2016)
- 200 metres – 21.05 (College Station 2015)
