= New Zealand cricket team in the West Indies in 2022 =

International cricket tour

	West Indies	New Zealand
- Dates: 10 – 21 August 2022
Captains	Nicholas Pooran (Note: Rovman Powell captained the West Indies for the third T20I.)	Kane Williamson (Note: Tom Latham captained New Zealand for the second and third ODIs.)

One Day International series
- Results: New Zealand won the 3-match series 2–1
Most runs	Nicholas Pooran (121)	Finn Allen (124); Daryl Mitchell (124)
Most wickets	Jason Holder (7)	Trent Boult (8)
- Player of the series: Mitchell Santner (NZ)

Twenty20 International series
- Results: New Zealand won the 3-match series 2–1
Most runs	Shamarh Brooks (105)	Glenn Phillips (134)
Most wickets	Odean Smith (7)	Mitchell Santner (6)
- Player of the series: Glenn Phillips (NZ)

The New Zealand cricket team toured the West Indies in August 2022 to play three One Day International (ODI) and three Twenty20 International (T20I) matches. The ODI series formed part of the inaugural 2020–2023 ICC Cricket World Cup Super League, with the tour took place straight after New Zealand's tour of the Netherlands.

Originally the tour was scheduled to take place in July 2020, but the COVID-19 pandemic put the tour in doubt. In April 2020, David White, Chief Executive of New Zealand Cricket, said that the tour would be "most unlikely" to happen. However, the tour was postponed after the fixtures clashed with the West Indies rescheduled tour to England. The full details of the rescheduled tour were confirmed on 1 June 2022.

== Squads ==
ODIs		T20Is	
West Indies	New Zealand	West Indies	New Zealand
Nicholas Pooran (c); Shai Hope (vc); Jermaine Blackwood; Shamarh Brooks; Yannic Cariah; Keacy Carty; ~~Shimron Hetmyer~~; Jason Holder; Akeal Hosein; Alzarri Joseph; Brandon King; Kyle Mayers; ~~Gudakesh Motie~~; ~~Keemo Paul~~; Jayden Seales; Kevin Sinclair	Kane Williamson (c); Finn Allen; Trent Boult; Michael Bracewell; Devon Conway; Lockie Ferguson; Martin Guptill; ~~Matt Henry~~; Tom Latham; Daryl Mitchell; James Neesham; Glenn Phillips; Mitchell Santner; Ben Sears; Ish Sodhi; Tim Southee	Nicholas Pooran (c); Rovman Powell (vc); Shamarh Brooks; Dominic Drakes; Shimron Hetmyer; Jason Holder; Akeal Hosein; Alzarri Joseph; Brandon King; Kyle Mayers; Obed McCoy; Keemo Paul; Romario Shepherd; Odean Smith; Devon Thomas; Hayden Walsh Jr.	Kane Williamson (c); Finn Allen; Trent Boult; Michael Bracewell; Devon Conway; Lockie Ferguson; Martin Guptill; ~~Matt Henry~~; Tom Latham; Daryl Mitchell; James Neesham; Glenn Phillips; Mitchell Santner; Ben Sears; Ish Sodhi; Tim Southee

On 13 August, New Zealand Cricket (NZC) announced that Matt Henry was ruled out of the tour due to rib injury, and was replaced by Ben Sears. Shimron Hetmyer, Gudakesh Motie and Keemo Paul all were ruled out of the ODI series due to different reasons, forcing Cricket West Indies (CWI) to add Jermaine Blackwood and Yannic Cariah to the West Indies' ODI squad. Odean Smith was also added to the squad as a reserve.

== T20I series ==
=== 1st T20I ===
10 August 2022
13:30
Scorecard

New Zealand; 185/5 (20 overs)	v	West Indies; 172/7 (20 overs)
Kane Williamson 47 (33); Odean Smith 3/32 (4 overs)		Shamarh Brooks 42 (43); Mitchell Santner 3/19 (4 overs)

New Zealand won by 13 runs
Sabina Park, Jamaica
Umpires: Nigel Duguid (WI) and Patrick Gustard (WI)
Player of the match: Mitchell Santner (NZ)

- West Indies won the toss and elected to field.

=== 2nd T20I ===
12 August 2022
13:30
Scorecard

New Zealand; 215/5 (20 overs)	v	West Indies; 125/9 (20 overs)
Glenn Phillips 76 (41); Obed McCoy 3/40 (4 overs)		Obed McCoy 23* (15); Michael Bracewell 3/15 (4 overs); Mitchell Santner 3/15 (4 overs)

New Zealand won by 90 runs
Sabina Park, Jamaica
Umpires: Patrick Gustard (WI) and Leslie Reifer (WI)
Player of the match: Glenn Phillips (NZ)

- New Zealand won the toss and elected to bat.

=== 3rd T20I ===
14 August 2022
13:30
Scorecard

New Zealand; 145/7 (20 overs)	v	West Indies; 150/2 (19 overs)
Glenn Phillips 41 (26); Odean Smith 3/29 (4 overs)		Shamarh Brooks 56* (59); Ish Sodhi 1/36 (4 overs)

West Indies won by 8 wickets
Sabina Park, Jamaica
Umpires: Gregory Brathwaite (WI) and Nigel Duguid (WI)
Player of the match: Brandon King (WI)

- New Zealand won the toss and elected to bat.

== ODI series ==
=== 1st ODI ===
17 August 2022
14:00 (D/N)
Scorecard

New Zealand; 190 (45.2 overs)	v	West Indies; 193/5 (39 overs)
Kane Williamson 34 (50); Akeal Hosein 3/28 (10 overs)		Shamarh Brooks 79 (91); Tim Southee 2/39 (10 overs)

West Indies won by 5 wickets
Kensington Oval, Barbados
Umpires: Gregory Brathwaite (WI) and Joel Wilson (WI)
Player of the match: Shamarh Brooks (WI)

- West Indies won the toss and elected to field.
- Yannic Cariah and Kevin Sinclair (WI) both made their ODI debuts.
- World Cup Super League points: West Indies 10, New Zealand 0.

=== 2nd ODI ===
19 August 2022
14:00 (D/N)
Scorecard

New Zealand; 212 (48.2 overs)	v	West Indies; 161 (35.3/41 overs)
Finn Allen 96 (117); Kevin Sinclair 4/41 (8.2 overs)		Yannic Cariah 52 (84); Tim Southee 4/22 (7 overs)

New Zealand won by 50 runs (DLS method)
Kensington Oval, Barbados
Umpires: Nigel Duguid (WI) and Joel Wilson (WI)
Player of the match: Finn Allen (NZ)

- West Indies won the toss and elected to field.
- West Indies were set a revised target of 212 runs from 41 overs due to rain.
- World Cup Super League points: New Zealand 10, West Indies 0.

=== 3rd ODI ===
21 August 2022
14:00 (D/N)
Scorecard

West Indies; 301/8 (50 overs)	v	New Zealand; 307/5 (47.1 overs)
Kyle Mayers 105 (110); Trent Boult 3/53 (10 overs)		Tom Latham 69 (75); Jason Holder 2/37 (7 overs)

New Zealand won by 5 wickets
Kensington Oval, Barbados
Umpires: Leslie Reifer (WI) and Joel Wilson (WI)
Player of the match: Tom Latham (NZ)

- New Zealand won the toss and elected to field.
- World Cup Super League points: New Zealand 10, West Indies −2. (Note: West Indies were deducted two Super League points for a slow over rate while bowling.)
