= English cricket team in South Africa in 2022–23 =

International cricket tour

| | South Africa | England |
- Dates: 27 January – 1 February 2023
| Captains | Temba Bavuma | Jos Buttler |

One Day International series
- Results: South Africa won the 3-match series 2–1
| Most runs | Temba Bavuma (180) | Jos Buttler (261) |
| Most wickets | Anrich Nortje (6) | Jofra Archer (7) |
- Player of the series: Jos Buttler (Eng)

The England cricket team toured South Africa in January and February 2023 to play three One Day International (ODI) matches. These matches formed part of the inaugural 2020–2023 ICC Cricket World Cup Super League, having been postponed during England's tour of South Africa in December 2020 due to a COVID-19 outbreak. The first two matches were played in Bloemfontein, and the last match in Kimberley.

England lost the opening ODI by 27 runs despite a century for Jason Roy helping them to 146/0 inside 20 overs, chasing South Africa's total of 298/7. South Africa completed their third-highest successful ODI chase in the second match, with a Temba Bavuma century leading them past England total of 342/7. In the third ODI, England recovered from 14/3 as Jos Buttler (131) and Dawid Malan (118) added 232 runs for the fourth wicket with team accelerating to a total of 346/7; Jofra Archer then took six wickets to complete a 59-run victory for the visitors.

== Squads ==
| South Africa | England |
|---|---|
| Temba Bavuma (c); Quinton de Kock; Reeza Hendricks; Marco Jansen; Heinrich Klaasen (wk); Sisanda Magala; Keshav Maharaj; Janneman Malan; Aiden Markram; David Miller; Lungi Ngidi; Anrich Nortje; Wayne Parnell; Kagiso Rabada; Tabraiz Shamsi; Rassie van der Dussen | Jos Buttler (c, wk); Moeen Ali; Jofra Archer; Harry Brook; Sam Curran; Ben Duckett; Dawid Malan; Adil Rashid; Jason Roy; Phil Salt; Olly Stone; Reece Topley; David Willey; Chris Woakes |

== ODI series ==
=== 1st ODI ===
27 January 2023
13:00 (D/N)
Scorecard

| South Africa; 298/7 (50 overs) | v | England; 271 (44.2 overs) |
| Rassie van der Dussen 111 (117); Sam Curran 3/35 (9 overs) | | Jason Roy 113 (91); Anrich Nortje 4/62 (10 overs) |

South Africa won by 27 runs
Mangaung Oval, Bloemfontein
Umpires: Marais Erasmus (SA) and Bongani Jele (SA)
Player of the match: Sisanda Magala (SA)

- South Africa won the toss and elected to bat.
- Harry Brook (Eng) made his ODI debut.
- World Cup Super League points: South Africa 10, England 0.

=== 2nd ODI ===
29 January 2023
10:00
Scorecard

| England; 342/7 (50 overs) | v | South Africa; 347/5 (49.1 overs) |
| Jos Buttler 94* (82); Anrich Nortje 2/64 (9 overs) | | Temba Bavuma 109 (102); Olly Stone 2/48 (10 overs) |

South Africa won by 5 wickets
Mangaung Oval, Bloemfontein
Umpires: Marais Erasmus (SA) and Adrian Holdstock (SA)
Player of the match: Temba Bavuma (SA)

- South Africa won the toss and elected to field.
- South Africa's 347/5 was a record successful run chase at this ground.
- World Cup Super League points: South Africa 10, England 0.

=== 3rd ODI ===
1 February 2023
13:00 (D/N)
Scorecard

| England; 346/7 (50 overs) | v | South Africa; 287 (43.1 overs) |
| Jos Buttler 131 (127); Lungi Ngidi 4/62 (10 overs) | | Heinrich Klaasen 80 (62); Jofra Archer 6/40 (9.1 overs) |

England won by 59 runs
Diamond Oval, Kimberley
Umpires: Marais Erasmus (SA) and Allahudien Paleker (SA)
Player of the match: Jos Buttler (Eng)

- South Africa won the toss and elected to field.
- The partnership between Jos Buttler and Dawid Malan (232) was England's fourth highest for any wicket, and the joint fifth highest fourth-wicket partnership for any team in ODIs.
- Jofra Archer's figures of 6/40 were the third best for England in ODIs.
- World Cup Super League points: England 10, South Africa –1. (Note: South Africa were deducted one WCSL point for bowling a slow over-rate.)
