= Pakistani cricket team in the Netherlands in 2022 =

International cricket tour

	Netherlands	Pakistan
- Dates: 16 – 21 August 2022
Captains	Scott Edwards	Babar Azam

One Day International series
- Results: Pakistan won the 3-match series 3–0
Most runs	Tom Cooper (193)	Babar Azam (222)
Most wickets	Bas de Leede (5); Vivian Kingma (5)	Naseem Shah (10)

The Pakistan cricket team toured the Netherlands to play three One Day International (ODI) matches in August 2022. The ODI series formed part of the inaugural 2020–2023 ICC Cricket World Cup Super League. It was the first bilateral ODI series between the two teams.

== Background ==
Pakistan were originally scheduled to tour the Netherlands in July 2020 to play three ODI matches, ahead of their tour of England. It would have been the first bilateral series between the two sides. Pakistan were also scheduled to play a two-match Twenty20 International (T20I) series against Ireland following this series. However, on 22 April 2020, the Dutch government announced that it had banned all events in the country, both sports and cultural, until 1 September 2020 due to the COVID-19 pandemic in the Netherlands.

In April 2022, both the Pakistan Cricket Board (PCB) and the Royal Dutch Cricket Association (KNCB) agreed on rescheduling the series for August 2022. Later the same month both cricket boards agreed the itinerary for the tour, with all the matches taking place in Rotterdam.

== Squads ==
Netherlands	Pakistan
Scott Edwards (c, wk); Shariz Ahmad; Musa Ahmed; Wesley Barresi; Tom Cooper; Bas de Leede; Aryan Dutt; Arnav Jain; Vivian Kingma; Ryan Klein; Teja Nidamanuru; Max O'Dowd; Tim Pringle; Vikramjit Singh; Logan van Beek	Babar Azam (c); Shadab Khan (vc); Shaheen Afridi; Shahnawaz Dahani; Imam-ul-Haq; Mohammad Haris (wk); Zahid Mahmood; Mohammad Nawaz; Haris Rauf; Mohammad Rizwan (wk); Agha Salman; Abdullah Shafique; Khushdil Shah; Naseem Shah; Mohammad Wasim; Fakhar Zaman

== ODI series ==
=== 1st ODI ===
16 August 2022
11:00
Scorecard

Pakistan; 314/6 (50 overs)	v	Netherlands; 298/8 (50 overs)
Fakhar Zaman 109 (109); Bas de Leede 2/42 (10 overs)		Scott Edwards 71* (60); Naseem Shah 3/51 (10 overs)

Pakistan won by 16 runs
Hazelaarweg Stadion, Rotterdam
Umpires: Rizwan Akram (Ned) and Michael Gough (Eng)
Player of the match: Fakhar Zaman (Pak)

- Pakistan won the toss and elected to bat.
- Salman Ali Agha and Naseem Shah (Pak) both made their ODI debuts.
- World Cup Super League points: Pakistan 10, Netherlands 0.

=== 2nd ODI ===
18 August 2022
11:00
Scorecard

Netherlands; 186 (44.1 overs)	v	Pakistan; 191/3 (33.4 overs)
Bas de Leede 89 (120); Haris Rauf 3/16 (7.1 overs)		Mohammad Rizwan 69* (82); Vivian Kingma 2/32 (4.4 overs)

Pakistan won by 7 wickets
Hazelaarweg Stadion, Rotterdam
Umpires: Nitin Bathi (Ned) and Michael Gough (Eng)
Player of the match: Mohammad Nawaz (Pak)

- Netherlands won the toss and elected to bat.
- World Cup Super League points: Pakistan 10, Netherlands 0.

=== 3rd ODI ===
21 August 2022
11:00
Scorecard

Pakistan; 206 (49.4 overs)	v	Netherlands; 197 (49.2 overs)
Babar Azam 91 (125); Bas de Leede 3/50 (9 overs)		Tom Cooper 62 (105); Naseem Shah 5/33 (10 overs)

Pakistan won by 9 runs
Hazelaarweg Stadion, Rotterdam
Umpires: Rizwan Akram (Ned) and Michael Gough (Eng)
Player of the match: Naseem Shah (Pak)

- Pakistan won the toss and elected to bat.
- Abdullah Shafique (Pak) made his ODI debut.
- World Cup Super League points: Pakistan 10, Netherlands 0.
