= Irish cricket team in the West Indies in 2021–22 =

International cricket tour

	West Indies	Ireland
- Dates: 8 – 16 January 2022
Captains	Kieron Pollard	Andrew Balbirnie (Note: Paul Stirling captained Ireland for the second and third ODIs.)

One Day International series
- Results: Ireland won the 3-match series 2–1
Most runs	Shamarh Brooks (137)	Harry Tector (159)
Most wickets	Akeal Hosein (6)	Andy McBrine (10)
- Player of the series: Andy McBrine (Ire)

The Ireland cricket team toured the West Indies in January 2022 to play three One Day International (ODI) matches and a one-off Twenty20 International (T20I) match. The ODI series formed part of the inaugural 2020–2023 ICC Cricket World Cup Super League. On 6 December 2021, the full schedule for the tour was confirmed by both cricket boards. Ireland last toured the West Indies in January 2020. Prior to the series, the Irish team were scheduled to play five white ball matches against the United States in Florida. However, the ODI matches were cancelled due to COVID-19 cases within the squads.

The second ODI, originally scheduled to be played on 11 January 2022, was postponed after Ireland captain Andrew Balbirnie, wicket-keeper Lorcan Tucker and interim head coach David Ripley tested positive for COVID-19. On 11 January 2022, both cricket boards agreed to reschedule the remaining fixtures, with the one-off T20I match being cancelled. With Balbirnie ruled out of the remaining matches, Paul Stirling was named as Ireland's captain for the second and third ODIs.

Ahead of the ODI series, Ireland played a 50-over tour match against Jamaica, losing the fixture by five wickets. The West Indies won the first ODI match by 24 runs, with Shamarh Brooks on debut top-scoring with 93. The second ODI was shortened due to rain, with Ireland winning the match by five wickets to level the series. Ireland won the third and final ODI by two wickets to win the series 2–1. Other than Afghanistan and Zimbabwe, it was Ireland's first ODI series win against a Test side. It was also Ireland's first ODI series win away from home against an ICC Full Member team.

== Squads ==
ODIs		T20Is	
West Indies	Ireland	West Indies	Ireland
Kieron Pollard (c); Shai Hope (vc); Shamarh Brooks; Roston Chase; Justin Greaves; Jason Holder; Akeal Hosein; Alzarri Joseph; Gudakesh Motie; Nicholas Pooran (wk); Jayden Seales; Romario Shepherd; Odean Smith; Devon Thomas	Andrew Balbirnie (c); Paul Stirling (c); Mark Adair; Curtis Campher; Gareth Delany; George Dockrell; Josh Little; Andy McBrine; Barry McCarthy; William Porterfield; Neil Rock; ~~Simi Singh~~; Harry Tector; Lorcan Tucker (wk); ~~Ben White~~; Craig Young	Kieron Pollard (c); Nicholas Pooran (vc); Roston Chase; Sheldon Cottrell; Dominic Drakes; Shai Hope; Akeal Hosein; Jason Holder; Brandon King; Kyle Mayers; Rovman Powell; Romario Shepherd; Odean Smith; Hayden Walsh Jr.	Andrew Balbirnie (c); Mark Adair; Curtis Campher; Gareth Delany; George Dockrell; Shane Getkate; Josh Little; Barry McCarthy; William McClintock; Neil Rock; ~~Simi Singh~~; Paul Stirling; Lorcan Tucker; ~~Ben White~~; Craig Young

Cricket West Indies named Keacy Carty and Sheldon Cottrell as reserves in their ODI squad, with Jayden Seales, Alzarri Joseph and Devon Thomas named as reserves in their T20I squad. Simi Singh and Ben White were both ruled out of Ireland's squad for the first ODI after providing positive COVID-19 tests. Singh and White were later ruled out of the rest of the series, after returning another positive test for COVID-19. Ireland's Paul Stirling and Shane Getkate also missed the first ODI, after they had to remain in the United States following positive COVID-19 tests, but rejoined the squad ahead of the second ODI. Andrew Balbirnie and Lorcan Tucker tested positive for COVID-19 ahead of the second ODI, resulting in the match being postponed.

== Tour match ==
5 January 2022
09:30
Scorecard

Ireland; 234 (48.3 overs)	v	Jamaica; 235/5 (38.4 overs)
George Dockrell 82 (107); Nicholson Gordon 5/34 (9.3 overs)		Rovman Powell 82* (63); Josh Little 3/21 (7 overs)

Jamaica won by 5 wickets
Sabina Park, Jamaica
Umpires: Gregory Brathwaite (WI) and Nigel Duguid (WI)

- Jamaica won the toss and elected to field.

== ODI series ==
=== 1st ODI ===
8 January 2022
09:30
Scorecard

West Indies; 269 (48.5 overs)	v	Ireland; 245 (49.1 overs)
Shamarh Brooks 93 (89); Mark Adair 3/38 (8.5 overs)		Andrew Balbirnie 71 (94); Romario Shepherd 3/50 (9 overs)

West Indies won by 24 runs
Sabina Park, Jamaica
Umpires: Nigel Duguid (WI) and Joel Wilson (WI)
Player of the match: Shamarh Brooks (WI)

- Ireland won the toss and elected to field.
- Shamarh Brooks, Justin Greaves, Odean Smith (WI) and Neil Rock (Ire) all made their ODI debuts.
- Neil Rock replaced Andy McBrine as a concussion substitute for Ireland.
- World Cup Super League points: West Indies 10, Ireland –2. (Note: Ireland were deducted two WCSL points for bowling a slow over-rate.)

=== 2nd ODI ===
13 January 2022
09:30
Scorecard

West Indies; 229 (48 overs)	v	Ireland; 168/5 (32.3 overs)
Romario Shepherd 50 (41); Andy McBrine 4/36 (10 overs)		Harry Tector 54* (75); Akeal Hosein 2/51 (8 overs)

Ireland won by 5 wickets (DLS method)
Sabina Park, Jamaica
Umpires: Leslie Reifer (WI) and Joel Wilson (WI)
Player of the match: Andy McBrine (Ire)

- Ireland won the toss and elected to field.
- Ireland were set a revised target of 168 runs from 36 overs due to rain.
- Paul Stirling captained Ireland for the first time in ODIs.
- Paul Stirling also became the first cricketer for Ireland to score 5,000 runs in ODIs.
- World Cup Super League points: Ireland 10, West Indies 0.

=== 3rd ODI ===
16 January 2022
09:30
Scorecard

West Indies; 212 (44.4 overs)	v	Ireland; 214/8 (44.5 overs)
Shai Hope 53 (39); Andy McBrine 4/28 (10 overs)		Andy McBrine 59 (100); Roston Chase 3/44 (10 overs)

Ireland won by 2 wickets
Sabina Park, Jamaica
Umpires: Gregory Brathwaite (WI) and Joel Wilson (WI)
Player of the match: Andy McBrine (Ire)

- Ireland won the toss and elected to field.
- World Cup Super League points: Ireland 10, West Indies 0.
