= 2020–2023 Cricket World Cup Super League =

International Cricket League

2020–23 ICC Men's Cricket World Cup Super League
- Dates: 30 July 2020 – 14 May 2023
- Administrator: International Cricket Council
- Cricket format: One Day International
- Tournament format: Group tournament
- Host: Various
- Participants: 13
- Matches: 156
- Most runs: (Pakistan) Babar Azam (1454)
- Most wickets: (Australia) Adam Zampa (41)
- Official website: icc-cricket.com

The 2020–23 ICC Men's Cricket World Cup Super League was the first edition of the ICC Cricket World Cup Super League, a One Day International (ODI) league. The league took place from July 2020 to May 2023, and served as part of the 2023 Cricket World Cup qualification process.

The league featured thirteen teams, the twelve Full Members of the International Cricket Council (ICC), and the Netherlands, who won the 2015–17 ICC World Cricket League Championship to qualify for this competition. Each team was scheduled to play an ODI series against eight of the other twelve teams, four series at home and four away. Each series consisted of three ODIs.

The COVID-19 pandemic affected the start of the league, with several series of matches being postponed. In April 2020, following a Chief Executives' meeting, the ICC announced that it would look at the future of the league at a later date, once there is a better understanding of the impact of the pandemic on cricket. The series between England and Ireland, starting 30 July 2020, were the first matches of the league. In March 2022, as a result of the impact from the pandemic, the ICC agreed to extend the cut-off date for the tournament until May 2023, allowing the series between Ireland and Bangladesh to take place.

== Teams and qualification pathway ==
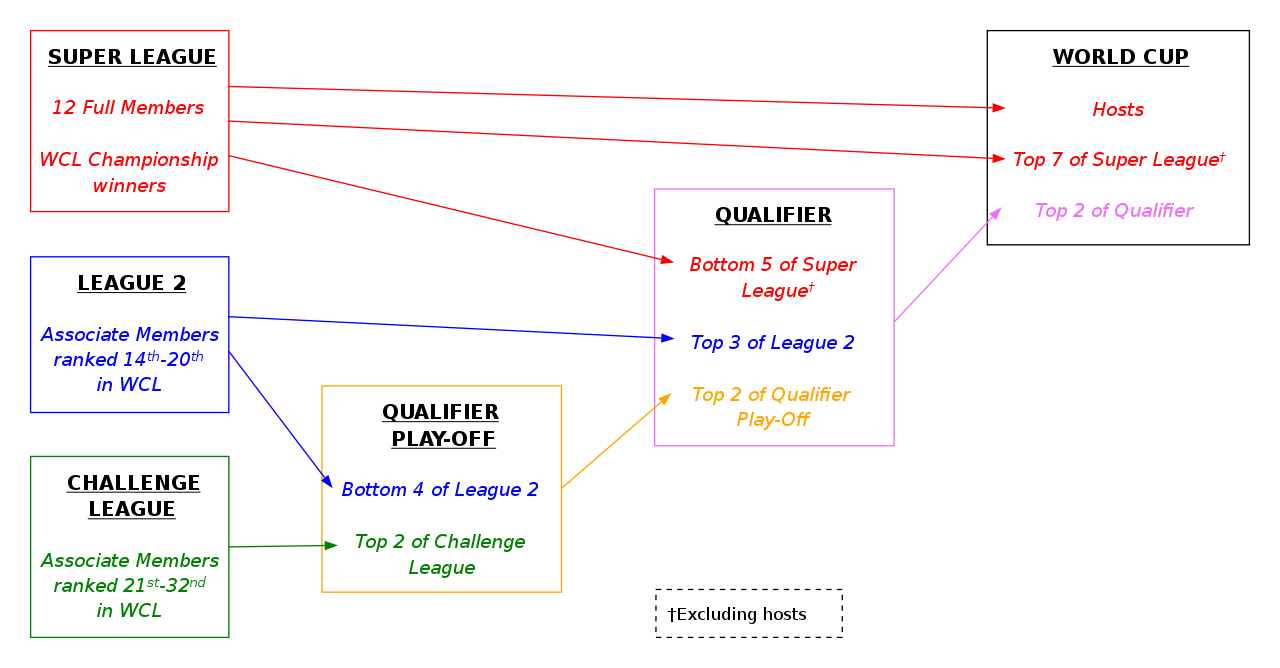
A diagram that explains the qualification structure for the 2023 ICC Cricket World Cup.

Thirteen teams qualified:

- Full Members of the ICC:
  - Afghanistan
  - Australia
  - Bangladesh
  - England
  - India
  - Ireland
  - New Zealand
  - Pakistan
  - South Africa
  - Sri Lanka
  - West Indies
  - Zimbabwe
- Winners of the 2015-2017 ICC Cricket World Cricket League Championship
  - Netherlands

For the World Cup, the hosts, and the top seven sides thereafter, qualified automatically. The remaining five teams advanced to a qualifying event—the 2023 Cricket World Cup Qualifier—along with five Associate sides, from which two sides went through to the World Cup.

The top twelve teams in this Super League remain in the Super League for the next World Cup cycle. The 13th ranked team in this Super League and the champions of the 2019–22 ICC Cricket World Cup League 2 took part in World Cup Qualifier, where the better team placed the 13th spot in the next Super League while the team ranked lower qualified in the next League 2.

== Format ==
The tournament was a partial round-robin league and played over two years. Each team were scheduled to play eight other opponents, four at home and four away, in series consisting of three ODI matches. This meant that a given team did not face all other opponents in their group, but all teams were scheduled to the same number of matches ( i.e., 12 matches at home and 12 matches away).

Points were awarded as follows:

- Win – 10 points
- No result or abandoned – 5 points
- Loss – 0 points
1. If a match was abandoned and the pitch or outfield was declared unfit by the ICC Pitch and Outfield Monitoring Process, then the match point was awarded to the visiting team.
2. A team that was behind the required over-rate at the end of a match teams had one competition point deducted for each over it was behind.
3. Tied matches were decided by a Super Over. If a Super Over were a tie, subsequent Super Overs played until there was a winner.

Following a trial that started in December 2019, the ICC announced the use of technology to monitor front-foot no-balls for all matches in the Super League. The third umpire called the front-foot no-balls, communicating with the on-field umpires.

== Schedule ==
The match schedule was announced by the ICC on 20 June 2018 as part of the 2018–23 ICC Future Tours Programme.

Home \ Away	(Afghanistan)	(Australia)	(Bangladesh)	(England)	(India)	(Ireland)	(Netherlands)	(New Zealand)	(Pakistan)	(South Africa)	(Sri Lanka)	(Cricket West Indies)	(Zimbabwe)
Afghanistan		Cancelled	—	—	—	3–0	3–0	—	Cancelled	—	—	—	—
Australia	—		—	—	2–1	—	—	3–0	—	Cancelled	—	—	2–1
Bangladesh	2–1	—		1–2	—	—	—	—	—	—	2–1	3–0	—
England	—	1–2	—		—	2–1	—	—	3–0	—	2–0	—	—
India	Cancelled	—	—	2–1		—	—	—	—	2–1	—	3–0	—
Ireland	—	—	0–2	—	—		—	0–3	—	1–1	—	—	1–1
Netherlands	—	—	—	0–3	—	2–1		—	0–3	—	—	0–3	—
New Zealand	—	—	3–0	—	1–0	—	3–0		—	—	2–0	—	—
Pakistan	—	2–1	—	—	—	—	—	1–2		—	—	3–0	2–1
South Africa	—	—	1–2	2–1	—	—	2–0	—	1–2		—	—	—
Sri Lanka	1–1	—	—	—	1–2	—	—	—	—	2–1		—	2–1
West Indies	—	1–2	—	—	—	1–2	—	1–2	—	—	3–0		—
Zimbabwe	0–3	—	0–3	—	0–3	—	2–1	—	—	—	—	—	

Source: ESPNcricinfo
Legend: Blue = home team win; Yellow = draw; Red = away team win.

The four teams that each side were not scheduled to face in the tournament was as follows:

Team	Did Not Play			
Afghanistan	England	New Zealand	South Africa	West Indies
Australia	Bangladesh	Ireland	Netherlands	Sri Lanka
Bangladesh	Australia	India	Netherlands	Pakistan
England	Afghanistan	New Zealand	West Indies	Zimbabwe
India	Bangladesh	Ireland	Netherlands	Pakistan
Ireland	Australia	India	Pakistan	Sri Lanka
Netherlands	Australia	India	Bangladesh	Sri Lanka
New Zealand	Afghanistan	England	South Africa	Zimbabwe
Pakistan	Bangladesh	India	Ireland	Sri Lanka
South Africa	Afghanistan	New Zealand	West Indies	Zimbabwe
Sri Lanka	Australia	Ireland	Netherlands	Pakistan
West Indies	Afghanistan	England	South Africa	Zimbabwe
Zimbabwe	England	New Zealand	South Africa	West Indies

=== COVID-19 pandemic ===
The COVID-19 pandemic began before the start of the league, which was originally scheduled for May 2020 to March 2022, and resulted in no international cricket being played from March to July 2020. All Super League fixtures scheduled for 2020 were postponed or rescheduled with considerations for pandemic-related restrictions. Fixtures had to be reconsidered to account for the disruptions to the schedule.

Bangladesh's matches against Ireland were postponed on 21 March 2020. In April 2020, South Africa's tour to Sri Lanka was postponed. The same month, Pakistan's tour of the Netherlands and the West Indies tour of the Netherlands were both postponed, after the Dutch government banned all events in the country, both sports and cultural, until 1 September 2020. On 15 May 2020, Cricket Ireland confirmed that the tour by New Zealand had also been postponed. On 12 June 2020, the Board of Control for Cricket in India (BCCI) confirmed that it had called off their tours to Zimbabwe and Sri Lanka. On 30 June, Cricket Australia confirmed that their planned home series against Zimbabwe had also been postponed due to the virus. New Zealand's tour of the West Indies was postponed, after the fixtures clashed with the West Indies rescheduled tour to England. In August 2020, the Netherlands' tour of the Zimbabwe was cancelled due to the pandemic.

The first matches of the Super League were Ireland's 3-match ODI series in England which were originally scheduled for September 2020 but brought forward to July and August with all three matches taking place in Southampton. Australia's tour of England, which was originally to take place in July 2020, was postponed and took place in September 2020. England's tour of South Africa was postponed following an outbreak of COVID-19 among members of both teams and the hotel staff.

In December 2020, the ICC rescheduled the postponed series to a new schedule which would end in March 2023. A further, minor extension to May 2023 was announced in March 2022.

== League table ==
Pos	Team	Pld	W	L	NR	Ded	Pts	NRR	Progress to
1	New Zealand	24	16	5	3	0	175	0.914	2023 Cricket World Cup (Note: India qualify automatically as hosts.)
2	England	24	15	8	1	0	155	0.976	2023 Cricket World Cup
3	Bangladesh	24	15	8	1	0	155	0.220	2023 Cricket World Cup
4	Australia	24	15	9	0	0	150	0.785	2023 Cricket World Cup
5	Afghanistan	18	14	3	1	0	145	0.573	2023 Cricket World Cup
6	India	21	13	6	2	1	139 (Note: India were deducted one point for a slow over rate against Australia on 27 November 2020.)	0.782	2023 Cricket World Cup
7	Pakistan	21	13	8	0	0	130	0.108	2023 Cricket World Cup
8	South Africa	24	9	13	2	2	98 (Note: South Africa were deducted one point for a slow over rate against Pakistan on 2 April 2021, and one point for a slow over rate against England on 1 February 2023.)	−0.077	2023 Cricket World Cup
9	West Indies	24	9	15	0	2	88 (Note: West Indies were deducted two points for a slow over rate against New Zealand on 21 August 2022.)	−0.738	2023 Cricket World Cup Qualifier
10	Sri Lanka	24	7	14	3	4	81 (Note: Sri Lanka were deducted two points for a slow over rate against West Indies on 14 March 2021, one point for a slow over rate against India on 20 July 2021, and one point for a slow over rate against New Zealand on 25 March 2023.)	−0.369	2023 Cricket World Cup Qualifier
11	Ireland	24	6	15	3	2	73 (Note: Ireland were deducted two points for a slow over rate against West Indies on 8 January 2022.)	−0.357	2023 Cricket World Cup Qualifier
12	Zimbabwe	24	6	17	1	0	65	−0.952	2023 Cricket World Cup Qualifier
13	Netherlands	24	3	20	1	0	35	−1.179	2023 Cricket World Cup Qualifier

Source: ICC, ESPN Cricinfo The series between Afghanistan and India, and Afghanistan and Pakistan were not played (or awarded to either side).
Notes:

In the event that one or more teams had the same number of points, the following tie-breaking procedure was used:

1. The team that had won the greater number of matches was placed higher.
2. If still equal, the team with the higher net run rate was placed higher.
3. If still equal, the team that was ranked in the higher position in the ICC Men's ODI Team Rankings on 1 July 2020 was placed higher.

== Fixtures ==
=== 2020 ===
==== England v Ireland ====
This series was originally scheduled for September 2020 but was rescheduled due to the COVID-19 pandemic.

30 July 2020 (D/N)
Scorecard

Ireland; 172 (44.4 overs)	v	England; 174/4 (27.5 overs)

England won by 6 wickets
Rose Bowl, Southampton
Points: England 10, Ireland 0

1 August 2020 (D/N)
Scorecard

Ireland; 212/9 (50 overs)	v	England; 216/6 (32.3 overs)

England won by 4 wickets
Rose Bowl, Southampton
Points: England 10, Ireland 0

4 August 2020 (D/N)
Scorecard

England; 328 (49.5 overs)	v	Ireland; 329/3 (49.5 overs)

Ireland won by 7 wickets
Rose Bowl, Southampton
Points: Ireland 10, England 0

==== England v Australia ====
This series was originally scheduled for July 2020 but was rescheduled due to the COVID-19 pandemic.

11 September 2020 (D/N)
Scorecard

Australia; 294/9 (50 overs)	v	England; 275/9 (50 overs)

Australia won by 19 runs
Old Trafford, Manchester
Points: Australia 10, England 0

13 September 2020 (D/N)
Scorecard

England; 231/9 (50 overs)	v	Australia; 207 (48.4 overs)

England won by 24 runs
Old Trafford, Manchester
Points: England 10, Australia 0

16 September 2020 (D/N)
Scorecard

England; 302/7 (50 overs)	v	Australia; 305/7 (49.4 overs)

Australia won by 3 wickets
Old Trafford, Manchester
Points: Australia 10, England 0

=== 2020–21 ===
==== Pakistan v Zimbabwe ====
This series was originally scheduled to begin in November 2020.

30 October 2020 (D/N)
Scorecard

Pakistan; 281/8 (50 overs)	v	Zimbabwe; 255 (49.4 overs)

Pakistan won by 26 runs
Rawalpindi Cricket Stadium, Rawalpindi
Points: Pakistan 10, Zimbabwe 0

1 November 2020 (D/N)
Scorecard

Zimbabwe; 206 (45.1 overs)	v	Pakistan; 208/4 (35.2 overs)

Pakistan won by 6 wickets
Rawalpindi Cricket Stadium, Rawalpindi
Points: Pakistan 10, Zimbabwe 0

3 November 2020 (D/N)
Scorecard

Zimbabwe; 278/6 (50 overs)	v	Pakistan; 278/9 (50 overs)

Match tied
(Zimbabwe won the Super Over)
Rawalpindi Cricket Stadium, Rawalpindi
Points: Zimbabwe 10, Pakistan 0

==== Australia v India ====
27 November 2020 (D/N)
Scorecard

Australia; 374/6 (50 overs)	v	India; 308/8 (50 overs)

Australia won by 66 runs
Sydney Cricket Ground, Sydney
Points: Australia 10, India −1

29 November 2020 (D/N)
Scorecard

Australia; 389/4 (50 overs)	v	India; 338/9 (50 overs)

Australia won by 51 runs
Sydney Cricket Ground, Sydney
Points: Australia 10, India 0

2 December 2020 (D/N)
Scorecard

India; 302/5 (50 overs)	v	Australia; 289 (49.3 overs)

India won by 13 runs
Manuka Oval, Canberra
Points: India 10, Australia 0

==== Bangladesh v West Indies ====
20 January 2021 (D/N)
Scorecard

West Indies; 122 (32.2 overs)	v	Bangladesh; 125/4 (33.5 overs)

Bangladesh won by 6 wickets
Sher-e-Bangla National Cricket Stadium, Dhaka
Points: Bangladesh 10, West Indies 0

22 January 2021 (D/N)
Scorecard

West Indies; 148 (43.4 overs)	v	Bangladesh; 149/3 (33.2 overs)

Bangladesh won by 7 wickets
Sher-e-Bangla National Cricket Stadium, Dhaka
Points: Bangladesh 10, West Indies 0

25 January 2021 (D/N)
Scorecard

Bangladesh; 297/6 (50 overs)	v	West Indies; 177 (44.2 overs)

Bangladesh won by 120 runs
Zohur Ahmed Chowdhury Stadium, Chittagong
Points: Bangladesh 10, West Indies 0

==== Afghanistan v Ireland ====
21 January 2021
Scorecard

Afghanistan; 287/9 (50 overs)	v	Ireland; 271/9 (50 overs)

Afghanistan won by 16 runs
Sheikh Zayed Cricket Stadium, Abu Dhabi
Points: Afghanistan 10, Ireland 0

24 January 2021
Scorecard

Ireland; 259/9 (50 overs)	v	Afghanistan; 260/3 (45.2 overs)

Afghanistan won by 7 wickets
Sheikh Zayed Cricket Stadium, Abu Dhabi
Points: Afghanistan 10, Ireland 0

26 January 2021
Scorecard

Afghanistan; 266/9 (50 overs)	v	Ireland; 230 (47.1 overs)

Afghanistan won by 36 runs
Sheikh Zayed Cricket Stadium, Abu Dhabi
Points: Afghanistan 10, Ireland 0

==== West Indies v Sri Lanka ====
10 March 2021
Scorecard

Sri Lanka; 232 (49 overs)	v	West Indies; 236/2 (47 overs)

West Indies won by 8 wickets
Sir Vivian Richards Stadium, Antigua
Points: West Indies 10, Sri Lanka 0

12 March 2021
Scoarecard

Sri Lanka; 273/8 (50 overs)	v	West Indies; 274/5 (49.4 overs)

West Indies won by 5 wickets
Sir Vivian Richards Stadium, Antigua
Points: West Indies 10, Sri Lanka 0

14 March 2021
Scorecard

Sri Lanka; 274/6 (50 overs)	v	West Indies; 276/5 (48.3 overs)

West Indies won by 5 wickets
Sir Vivian Richards Stadium, Antigua
Points: West Indies 10, Sri Lanka −2

==== New Zealand v Bangladesh ====
20 March 2021
Scorecard

Bangladesh; 131 (41.5 overs)	v	New Zealand; 132/2 (21.2 overs)

New Zealand won by 8 wickets
University of Otago Oval, Dunedin
Points: New Zealand 10, Bangladesh 0

23 March 2021 (D/N)
Scorecard

Bangladesh; 271/6 (50 overs)	v	New Zealand; 275/5 (48.2 overs)

New Zealand won by 5 wickets
Hagley Oval, Christchurch
Points: New Zealand 10, Bangladesh 0

26 March 2021
Scorecard

New Zealand; 318/6 (50 overs)	v	Bangladesh; 154 (42.4 overs)

New Zealand won by 164 runs
Basin Reserve, Wellington
Points: New Zealand 10, Bangladesh 0

==== India v England ====
This series was originally scheduled for September 2020. However, with the IPL being rescheduled to September–November 2020, this series was postponed to March 2021.

23 March 2021 (D/N)
Scorecard

India; 317/5 (50 overs)	v	England; 251 (42.1 overs)

India won by 66 runs
Maharashtra Cricket Association Stadium, Pune
Points: India 10, England 0

26 March 2021 (D/N)
Scorecard

India; 336/6 (50 overs)	v	England; 337/4 (43.3 overs)

England won by 6 wickets
Maharashtra Cricket Association Stadium, Pune
Points: England 10, India 0

28 March 2021 (D/N)
Scorecard

India; 329 (48.2 overs)	v	England; 322/9 (50 overs)

India won by 7 runs
Maharashtra Cricket Association Stadium, Pune
Points: India 10, England 0

==== South Africa v Pakistan ====
This series was originally scheduled for October 2020 but was rescheduled due to the COVID-19 pandemic.

2 April 2021
Scorecard

South Africa; 273/6 (50 overs)	v	Pakistan; 274/7 (50 overs)

Pakistan won by 3 wickets
Centurion Park, Centurion
Points: Pakistan 10, South Africa −1

4 April 2021
Scorecard

South Africa; 341/6 (50 overs)	v	Pakistan; 324/9 (50 overs)

South Africa won by 17 runs
Wanderers Stadium, Johannesburg
Points: South Africa 10, Pakistan 0

7 April 2021
Scorecard

Pakistan; 320/7 (50 overs)	v	South Africa; 292 (49.3 overs)

Pakistan won by 28 runs
Centurion Park, Centurion
Points: Pakistan 10, South Africa 0

=== 2021 ===
==== Bangladesh v Sri Lanka ====
This series was originally scheduled for December 2020 but was rescheduled due to the COVID-19 pandemic.

23 May 2021
Scorecard

Bangladesh; 257/6 (50 overs)	v	Sri Lanka; 224 (48.1 overs)

Bangladesh won by 33 runs
Sher-e-Bangla National Cricket Stadium, Dhaka
Points: Bangladesh 10, Sri Lanka 0

25 May 2021
Scorecard

Bangladesh; 246 (48.1 overs)	v	Sri Lanka; 141/9 (40 overs)

Bangladesh won by 103 runs (DLS method)
Sher-e-Bangla National Cricket Stadium, Dhaka
Points: Bangladesh 10, Sri Lanka 0

28 May 2021
Scorecard

Sri Lanka; 286/6 (50 overs)	v	Bangladesh; 189 (42.3 overs)

Sri Lanka won by 97 runs
Sher-e-Bangla National Cricket Stadium, Dhaka
Points: Sri Lanka 10, Bangladesh 0

==== Netherlands v Ireland ====
2 June 2021
Scorecard

Netherlands; 195 (50 overs)	v	Ireland; 194/9 (50 overs)

Netherlands won by 1 run
Sportpark Maarschalkerweerd, Utrecht
Points: Netherlands 10, Ireland 0

4 June 2021
Scorecard

Netherlands; 157 (49.2 overs)	v	Ireland; 158/2 (43 overs)

Ireland won by 8 wickets
Sportpark Maarschalkerweerd, Utrecht
Points: Ireland 10, Netherlands 0

7 June 2021
Scorecard

Ireland; 163 (49.2 overs)	v	Netherlands; 166/6 (45.5 overs)

Netherlands won by 4 wickets
Sportpark Maarschalkerweerd, Utrecht
Points: Netherlands 10, Ireland 0

==== England v Sri Lanka ====
29 June 2021
Scorecard

Sri Lanka; 185 (42.3 overs)	v	England; 189/5 (34.5 overs)

England won by 5 wickets
Riverside Ground, Chester-le-Street
Points: England 10, Sri Lanka 0

1 July 2021
Scorecard

Sri Lanka; 241/9 (50 overs)	v	England; 244/2 (43 overs)

England won by 8 wickets
The Oval, London
Points: England 10, Sri Lanka 0

4 July 2021
Scorecard

Sri Lanka; 166 (41.1 overs)	v	England

No result
Bristol County Ground, Bristol
Points: England 5, Sri Lanka 5

==== England v Pakistan ====
8 July 2021
Scorecard

Pakistan; 141 (35.2 overs)	v	England; 142/1 (21.5 overs)

England won by 9 wickets
Sophia Gardens, Cardiff
Points: England 10, Pakistan 0

10 July 2021
Scorecard

England; 247 (45.2 overs)	v	Pakistan; 195 (41 overs)

England won by 52 runs
Lord's, London
Points: England 10, Pakistan 0

13 July 2021
Scorecard

Pakistan; 331/9 (50 overs)	v	England; 332/7 (48 overs)

England won by 3 wickets
Edgbaston, Birmingham
Points: England 10, Pakistan 0

==== Ireland v South Africa ====
11 July 2021
Scorecard

Ireland; 195/4 (40.2 overs)	v	South Africa

No result
The Village, Malahide
Points: Ireland 5, South Africa 5

13 July 2021
Scorecard

Ireland; 290/5 (50 overs)	v	South Africa; 247 (48.3 overs)

Ireland won by 43 runs
The Village, Malahide
Points: Ireland 10, South Africa 0

16 July 2021
Scorecard

South Africa; 346/4 (50 overs)	v	Ireland; 276 (47.1 overs)

South Africa won by 70 runs
The Village, Malahide
Points: South Africa 10, Ireland 0

==== Zimbabwe v Bangladesh ====
16 July 2021
Scorecard

Bangladesh; 276/9 (50 overs)	v	Zimbabwe; 121 (28.5 overs)

Bangladesh won by 155 runs
Harare Sports Club, Harare
Points: Bangladesh 10, Zimbabwe 0

18 July 2021
Scorecard

Zimbabwe; 240/9 (50 overs)	v	Bangladesh; 242/7 (49.1 overs)

Bangladesh won by 3 wickets
Harare Sports Club, Harare
Points: Bangladesh 10, Zimbabwe 0

20 July 2021
Scorecard

Zimbabwe; 298 (49.3 overs)	v	Bangladesh; 302/5 (48 overs)

Bangladesh won by 5 wickets
Harare Sports Club, Harare
Points: Bangladesh 10, Zimbabwe 0

==== Sri Lanka v India ====
This series was originally scheduled for June 2020 but was rescheduled to July 2021 due to the COVID-19 pandemic.

18 July 2021
Scorecard

Sri Lanka; 262/9 (50 overs)	v	India; 263/3 (36.4 overs)

India won by 7 wickets
R. Premadasa Stadium, Colombo
Points: India 10, Sri Lanka 0

20 July 2021
Scorecard

Sri Lanka; 275/9 (50 overs)	v	India; 277/7 (49.1 overs)

India won by 3 wickets
R. Premadasa Stadium, Colombo
Points: India 10, Sri Lanka −1

23 July 2021
Scorecard

India; 225 (43.1 overs)	v	Sri Lanka; 227/7 (39 overs)

Sri Lanka won by 3 wickets (DLS method)
R. Premadasa Stadium, Colombo
Points: Sri Lanka 10, India 0

==== West Indies v Australia ====
20 July 2021 (D/N)
Scorecard

Australia; 252/9 (49 overs)	v	West Indies; 123 (26.2 overs)

Australia won by 133 runs (DLS method)
Kensington Oval, Barbados
Points: Australia 10, West Indies 0

22–24 July 2021 (Note: The toss for this match took place on 22 July, with play being suspended due to a positive COVID-19 case. Per the ICC's playing conditions, play resumed on 24 July from when the toss occurred, as the match was not abandoned.) (D/N)
Scorecard

Australia; 187 (47.1 overs)	v	West Indies; 191/6 (38 overs)

West Indies won by 4 wickets
Kensington Oval, Barbados
Points: West Indies 10, Australia 0

26 July 2021 (Note: The match was originally scheduled to play on 24 July 2021 and rescheduled due to COVID-19.) (D/N)
Scorecard

West Indies; 152 (45.1 overs)	v	Australia; 153/4 (30.3 overs)

Australia won by 6 wickets
Kensington Oval, Barbados
Points: Australia 10, West Indies 0

==== Ireland v Zimbabwe ====
8 September 2021
Scorecard

Zimbabwe; 266/7 (50 overs)	v	Ireland; 228 (48.4 overs)

Zimbabwe won by 38 runs
Stormont, Belfast
Points: Zimbabwe 10, Ireland 0

10 September 2021
Scorecard

Ireland; 282/8 (50 overs)	v	Zimbabwe

No result
Stormont, Belfast
Points: Ireland 5, Zimbabwe 5

13 September 2021
Scorecard

Zimbabwe; 131 (34 overs)	v	Ireland; 118/3 (22.2 overs)

Ireland won by 7 wickets (DLS method)
Stormont, Belfast
Points: Ireland 10, Zimbabwe 0

=== 2021–22 ===
==== Sri Lanka v South Africa ====
This series was originally scheduled for June 2020 but was postponed due to the COVID-19 pandemic.

2 September 2021 (D/N)
Scorecard

Sri Lanka; 300/9 (50 overs)	v	South Africa; 286/6 (50 overs)

Sri Lanka won by 14 runs
R. Premadasa Stadium, Colombo
Points: Sri Lanka 10, South Africa 0

4 September 2021 (D/N)
Scorecard

South Africa; 283/6 (47 overs)	v	Sri Lanka; 197 (36.4 overs)

South Africa won by 67 runs (DLS method)
R. Premadasa Stadium, Colombo
Points: South Africa 10, Sri Lanka 0

7 September 2021 (D/N)
Scorecard

Sri Lanka; 203/9 (50 overs)	v	South Africa; 125 (30 overs)

Sri Lanka won by 78 runs
R. Premadasa Stadium, Colombo
Points: Sri Lanka 10, South Africa 0

==== South Africa v Netherlands ====
26 November 2021
Scorecard

South Africa; 277/8 (50 overs)	v	Netherlands; 11/0 (2 overs)

No result
Centurion Park, Centurion
Points: South Africa 5, Netherlands 5

31 March 2023 (D/N)
Scorecard

Netherlands; 189 (46.1 overs)	v	South Africa; 190/2 (30 overs)

South Africa won by 8 wickets
Willowmoore Park, Benoni
Points: South Africa 10, Netherlands 0

2 April 2023
Scorecard

South Africa; 370/8 (50 overs)	v	Netherlands; 224 (39.1 overs)

South Africa won by 146 runs
Wanderers Stadium, Johannesburg
Points: South Africa 10, Netherlands 0

==== West Indies v Ireland ====
8 January 2022
Scorecard

West Indies; 269 (48.5 overs)	v	Ireland; 245 (49.1 overs)

West Indies won by 24 runs
Sabina Park, Jamaica
Points: West Indies 10, Ireland −2

13 January 2022
Scorecard

West Indies; 229 (48 overs)	v	Ireland; 168/5 (32.4 overs)

Ireland won by 5 wickets (DLS method)
Sabina Park, Jamaica
Points: Ireland 10, West Indies 0

16 January 2022
Scorecard

West Indies; 212 (44.4 overs)	v	Ireland; 214/8 (44.5 overs)

Ireland won by 2 wickets
Sabina Park, Jamaica
Points: Ireland 10, West Indies 0

==== Sri Lanka v Zimbabwe ====
This series was originally scheduled for October 2020 but was postponed due to the COVID-19 pandemic.

16 January 2022 (D/N)
Scorecard

Zimbabwe; 296/9 (50 overs)	v	Sri Lanka; 300/5 (48.3 overs)

Sri Lanka won by 5 wickets
Pallekele International Cricket Stadium, Kandy
Points: Sri Lanka 10, Zimbabwe 0

18 January 2022 (D/N)
Scorecard

Zimbabwe; 302/8 (50 overs)	v	Sri Lanka; 280/9 (50 overs)

Zimbabwe won by 22 runs
Pallekele International Cricket Stadium, Kandy
Points: Zimbabwe 10, Sri Lanka 0

21 January 2022 (D/N)
Scorecard

Sri Lanka; 254/9 (50 overs)	v	Zimbabwe; 70 (24.4 overs)

Sri Lanka won by 184 runs
Pallekele International Cricket Stadium, Kandy
Points: Sri Lanka 10, Zimbabwe 0

==== Afghanistan v Netherlands ====
21 January 2022
Scorecard

Afghanistan; 222/8 (50 overs)	v	Netherlands; 186 (48 overs)

Afghanistan won by 36 runs
West End Park International Cricket Stadium, Doha
Points: Afghanistan 10, Netherlands 0

23 January 2022
Scorecard

Afghanistan; 237/6 (50 overs)	v	Netherlands; 189 (47.4 overs)

Afghanistan won by 48 runs
West End Park International Cricket Stadium, Doha
Points: Afghanistan 10, Netherlands 0

25 January 2022
Scorecard

Afghanistan; 254/5 (50 overs)	v	Netherlands; 179 (42.4 overs)

Afghanistan won by 75 runs
West End Park International Cricket Stadium, Doha
Points: Afghanistan 10, Netherlands 0

==== India v West Indies ====
6 February 2022
Scorecard

West Indies; 176 (43.5 overs)	v	India; 178/4 (28 overs)

India won by 6 wickets
Narendra Modi Stadium, Ahmedabad
Points: India 10, West Indies 0

9 February 2022
Scorecard

India; 237/9 (50 overs)	v	West Indies; 193 (46 overs)

India won by 44 runs
Narendra Modi Stadium, Ahmedabad
Points: India 10, West Indies 0

11 February 2022
Scorecard

India; 265 (50 overs)	v	West Indies; 169 (37.1 overs)

India won by 96 runs
Narendra Modi Stadium, Ahmedabad
Points: India 10, West Indies 0

==== Bangladesh v Afghanistan ====
23 February 2022
Scorecard

Afghanistan; 215 (49.1 overs)	v	Bangladesh; 219/6 (48.5 overs)

Bangladesh won by 4 wickets
Zohur Ahmed Chowdhury Stadium, Chittagong
Points: Bangladesh 10, Afghanistan 0

25 February 2022
Scorecard

Bangladesh; 306/4 (50 overs)	v	Afghanistan; 218 (45.1 overs)

Bangladesh won by 88 runs
Zohur Ahmed Chowdhury Stadium, Chittagong
Points: Bangladesh 10, Afghanistan 0

28 February 2022
Scorecard

Bangladesh; 192 (46.5 overs)	v	Afghanistan; 193/3 (40.1 overs)

Afghanistan won by 7 wickets
Zohur Ahmed Chowdhury Stadium, Chittagong
Points: Afghanistan 10, Bangladesh 0

==== South Africa v Bangladesh ====
18 March 2022
Scorecard

Bangladesh; 314/7 (50 overs)	v	South Africa; 276 (48.5 overs)

Bangladesh won by 38 runs
Centurion Park, Centurion
Points: Bangladesh 10, South Africa 0

20 March 2022
Scorecard

Bangladesh; 194/9 (50 overs)	v	South Africa; 195/3 (37.2 overs)

South Africa won by 7 wickets
New Wanderers Stadium, Johannesburg
Points: South Africa 10, Bangladesh 0

23 March 2022
Scorecard

South Africa; 154 (37 overs)	v	Bangladesh; 156/1 (26.3 overs)

Bangladesh won by 9 wickets
Centurion Park, Centurion
Points: Bangladesh 10, South Africa 0

==== New Zealand v Netherlands ====
29 March 2022
Scorecard

Netherlands; 202 (49.4 overs)	v	New Zealand; 204/3 (38.3 overs)

New Zealand won by 7 wickets
Bay Oval, Tauranga
Points: New Zealand 10, Netherlands 0

2 April 2022
Scorecard

New Zealand; 264/9 (50 overs)	v	Netherlands; 146 (34.1 overs)

New Zealand won by 118 runs
Seddon Park, Hamilton
Points: New Zealand 10, Netherlands 0

4 April 2022
Scorecard

New Zealand; 333/8 (50 overs)	v	Netherlands; 218 (42.3 overs)

New Zealand won by 115 runs
Seddon Park, Hamilton
Points: New Zealand 10, Netherlands 0

==== Pakistan v Australia ====
29 March 2022
Scorecard

Australia; 313/7 (50 overs)	v	Pakistan; 225 (45.2 overs)

Australia won by 88 runs
Gaddafi Stadium, Lahore
Points: Australia 10, Pakistan 0

31 March 2022
Scorecard

Australia; 348/8 (50 overs)	v	Pakistan; 349/4 (49 overs)

Pakistan won by 6 wickets
Gaddafi Stadium, Lahore
Points: Pakistan 10, Australia 0

2 April 2022
Scorecard

Australia; 210 (41.5 overs)	v	Pakistan; 214/1 (37.5 overs)

Pakistan won by 9 wickets
Gaddafi Stadium, Lahore
Points: Pakistan 10, Australia 0

=== 2022 ===
==== Netherlands v West Indies ====
This series was originally scheduled for July 2020 but was postponed due to the COVID-19 pandemic.

31 May 2022
Scorecard

Netherlands; 240/7 (45 overs)	v	West Indies; 249/3 (43.1 overs)

West Indies won by 7 wickets (DLS method)
VRA Cricket Ground, Amstelveen
Points: West Indies 10, Netherlands 0

2 June 2022
Scorecard

Netherlands; 214 (48.3 overs)	v	West Indies; 217/5 (45.3 overs)

West Indies won by 5 wickets
VRA Cricket Ground, Amstelveen
Points: West Indies 10, Netherlands 0

4 June 2022
Scorecard

West Indies; 308/5 (50 overs)	v	Netherlands; 288 (49.5 overs)

West Indies won by 20 runs
VRA Cricket Ground, Amstelveen
Points: West Indies 10, Netherlands 0

==== Zimbabwe v Afghanistan ====
The series was scheduled for February 2022. It was postponed in January 2022 after Zimbabwe Cricket could not secure all the broadcasting services including the Decision Review System. It was subsequently rescheduled for June 2022.

4 June 2022
Scorecard

Afghanistan; 276/5 (50 overs)	v	Zimbabwe; 216 (50 overs)

Afghanistan won by 60 runs
Harare Sports Club, Harare
Points: Afghanistan 10, Zimbabwe 0

6 June 2022
Scorecard

Zimbabwe; 228 (50 overs)	v	Afghanistan; 229/2 (44.3 overs)

Afghanistan won by 8 wickets
Harare Sports Club, Harare
Points: Afghanistan 10, Zimbabwe 0

9 June 2022
Scorecard

Zimbabwe; 135 (44.5 overs)	v	Afghanistan; 137/6 (37.4 overs)

Afghanistan won by 4 wickets
Harare Sports Club, Harare
Points: Afghanistan 10, Zimbabwe 0

==== Pakistan v West Indies ====
The matches were originally scheduled to be played in December 2021, but were postponed after multiple cases of COVID-19 were confirmed in the West Indies team and support staff.

8 June 2022 (D/N)
Scorecard

West Indies; 305/8 (50 overs)	v	Pakistan; 306/5 (49.2 overs)

Pakistan won by 5 wickets
Multan Cricket Stadium, Multan
Points: Pakistan 10, West Indies 0

10 June 2022 (D/N)
Scorecard

Pakistan; 275/8 (50 overs)	v	West Indies; 155 (32.2 overs)

Pakistan won by 120 runs
Multan Cricket Stadium, Multan
Points: Pakistan 10, West Indies 0

12 June 2022 (D/N)
Scorecard

Pakistan; 269/9 (48 overs)	v	West Indies; 216 (37.2 overs)

Pakistan won by 53 runs (DLS method)
Multan Cricket Stadium, Multan
Points: Pakistan 10, West Indies 0

==== Netherlands v England ====
The tour was originally scheduled for May 2021 but was postponed by a year.

17 June 2022
Scorecard

England; 498/4 (50 overs)	v	Netherlands; 266 (49.3 overs)

England won by 232 runs
VRA Cricket Ground, Amstelveen
Points: England 10, Netherlands 0

19 June 2022
Scorecard

Netherlands; 235/7 (41 overs)	v	England; 239/4 (36.1 overs)

England won by 6 wickets
VRA Cricket Ground, Amstelveen
Points: England 10, Netherlands 0

22 June 2022
Scorecard

Netherlands; 244 (49.2 overs)	v	England; 248/2 (30.1 overs)

England won by 8 wickets
VRA Cricket Ground, Amstelveen
Points: England 10, Netherlands 0

==== Ireland v New Zealand ====
This series was originally scheduled for June 2020 but was postponed due to the COVID-19 pandemic.

10 July 2022
Scorecard

Ireland; 300/9 (50 overs)	v	New Zealand; 305/9 (49.5 overs)

New Zealand won by 1 wicket
The Village, Malahide
Points: New Zealand 10, Ireland 0

12 July 2022
Scorecard

Ireland; 216 (48 overs)	v	New Zealand; 219/7 (38.1 overs)

New Zealand won by 3 wickets
The Village, Malahide
Points: New Zealand 10, Ireland 0

15 July 2022
Scorecard

New Zealand; 360/6 (50 overs)	v	Ireland; 359/9 (50 overs)

New Zealand won by 1 run
The Village, Malahide
Points: New Zealand 10, Ireland 0

==== Netherlands v Pakistan ====
This series was originally scheduled for July 2020 but was postponed due to the COVID-19 pandemic. It was subsequently rescheduled for August 2022.

16 August 2022
Scorecard

Pakistan; 314/6 (50 overs)	v	Netherlands; 298/8 (50 overs)

Pakistan won by 16 runs
Hazelaarweg Stadion, Rotterdam
Points: Pakistan 10, Netherlands 0

18 August 2022
Scorecard

Netherlands; 186 (44.1 overs)	v	Pakistan; 191/3 (33.4 overs)

Pakistan won by 7 wickets
Hazelaarweg Stadion, Rotterdam
Points: Pakistan 10, Netherlands 0

21 August 2022
Scorecard

Pakistan; 206 (49.4 overs)	v	Netherlands; 197 (49.2 overs)

Pakistan won by 9 runs
Hazelaarweg Stadion, Rotterdam
Points: Pakistan 10, Netherlands 0

==== West Indies v New Zealand ====
This series was originally scheduled for July 2020 but was postponed due to the COVID-19 pandemic. It was subsequently rescheduled for August 2022.

17 August 2022 (D/N)
Scorecard

New Zealand; 190 (45.2 overs)	v	West Indies; 193/5 (39 overs)

West Indies won by 5 wickets
Kensington Oval, Bridgetown
Points: West Indies 10, New Zealand 0

19 August 2022 (D/N)

New Zealand; 212 (48.2 overs)	v	West Indies; 213/5 (35.3 overs)

West Indies won by 5 wickets
Kensington Oval, Bridgetown
Points: West Indies 10, New Zealand 0

21 August 2022 (D/N)
Scorecard

West Indies; 301/8 (50 overs)	v	New Zealand; 307/5 (47.1 overs)

New Zealand won by 5 wickets
Kensington Oval, Bridgetown
Points: New Zealand 10, West Indies −2

==== Zimbabwe v India ====
This series was originally scheduled for August 2020 but was postponed due to the COVID-19 pandemic. It was subsequently rescheduled for August 2022.

18 August 2022
Scorecard

Zimbabwe; 189 (40.3 overs)	v	India; 192/0 (30.5 overs)

India won by 10 wickets
Harare Sports Club, Harare
Points: India 10, Zimbabwe 0

20 August 2022
Scorecard

Zimbabwe; 161 (38.1 overs)	v	India; 167/5 (25.4 overs)

India won by 5 wickets
Harare Sports Club, Harare
Points: India 10, Zimbabwe 0

22 August 2022
Scorecard

India; 289/8 (50 overs)	v	Zimbabwe; 276 (49.3 overs)

India won by 13 runs
Harare Sports Club, Harare
Points: India 10, Zimbabwe 0

==== Australia v Zimbabwe ====
This series was originally scheduled for August 2020 but was postponed due to the COVID-19 pandemic. It was subsequently rescheduled to August 2022.

28 August 2022
Scorecard

Zimbabwe; 200 (47.3 overs)	v	Australia; 201/5 (33.3 overs)

Australia won by 5 wickets
Riverway Stadium, Townsville
Points: Australia 10, Zimbabwe 0

31 August 2022
Scorecard

Zimbabwe; 96 (27.5 overs)	v	Australia; 100/2 (14.4 overs)

Australia won by 8 wickets
Riverway Stadium, Townsville
Points: Australia 10, Zimbabwe 0

3 September 2022
Scorecard

Australia; 141 (31 overs)	v	Zimbabwe; 142/7 (39 overs)

Zimbabwe won by 3 wickets
Riverway Stadium, Townsville
Points: Zimbabwe 10, Australia 0

=== 2022–23 ===
==== Australia v New Zealand (Chappell–Hadlee Trophy) ====
This series was originally scheduled for January–February 2021 but was postponed due to the COVID-19 pandemic until the 2021–22 season. However, the tour was postponed in January 2022 due to the uncertainty of the quarantine rules for when the New Zealand team return home. It was subsequently scheduled for September 2022.

6 September 2022 (D/N)
Scorecard

New Zealand; 9/232 (50 overs)	v	Australia; 8/233 (45 overs)

Australia won by 2 wickets
Cazalys Stadium, Cairns
Points: Australia 10, New Zealand 0

8 September 2022 (D/N)
Scorecard

Australia; 9/195 (50 overs)	v	New Zealand; 82 (33 overs)

Australia won by 113 runs
Cazalys Stadium, Cairns
Points: Australia 10, New Zealand 0

11 September 2022 (D/N)
Scorecard

Australia; 5/267 (50 overs)	v	New Zealand; 242 (49.5 overs)

Australia won by 25 runs
Cazalys Stadium, Cairns
Points: Australia 10, New Zealand 0

==== India v South Africa ====
6 October 2022 (D/N)
Scorecard

South Africa; 249/4 (40 overs)	v	India; 240/8 (40 overs)

South Africa won by 9 runs
BRSABV Ekana Cricket Stadium, Lucknow
Points: South Africa 10, India 0

9 October 2022 (D/N)
Scorecard

South Africa; 278/7 (50 overs)	v	India; 282/3 (45.5 overs)

India won by 7 wickets
JSCA International Stadium Complex, Ranchi
Points: India 10, South Africa 0

11 October 2022 (D/N)
Scorecard

South Africa; 99 (27.1 overs)	v	India; 105/3 (19.1 overs)

India won by 7 wickets
Arun Jaitley Stadium, Delhi
Points: India 10, South Africa 0

==== New Zealand v India ====
India's tour of New Zealand was postponed due to a packed calendar and COVID-19 related restrictions. The tour was subsequently rescheduled to follow the 2022 ICC Men's T20 World Cup in November 2022. On 28 June 2022, New Zealand Cricket confirmed the dates for the tour.

25 November 2022 (D/N)
Scorecard

India; 306/7 (50 overs)	v	New Zealand; 309/3 (47.1 overs)

New Zealand won by 7 wickets
Eden Park, Auckland
Points: New Zealand 10, India 0

27 November 2022 (D/N)
Scorecard

India; 89/1 (12.5 overs)	v	New Zealand

No result
Seddon Park, Hamilton
Points: New Zealand 5, India 5

30 November 2022 (D/N)
Scorecard

India; 219 (47.3 overs)	v	New Zealand; 104/1 (18 overs)

No result
Hagley Oval, Christchurch
Points: New Zealand 5, India 5

==== Sri Lanka v Afghanistan ====
Afghanistan's tour of Sri Lanka was originally rescheduled for January 2023, but it was subsequently announced that the games would take place in November 2022.

25 November 2022
Scorecard

Afghanistan; 294/8 (50 overs)	v	Sri Lanka; 234 (38 overs)

Afghanistan won by 60 runs
Pallekele International Cricket Stadium, Kandy
Points: Afghanistan 10, Sri Lanka 0

27 November 2022
Scorecard

Afghanistan; 228 (48.2 overs)	v	Sri Lanka; 10/0 (2.4 overs)

No result
Pallekele International Cricket Stadium, Kandy
Points: Sri Lanka 5, Afghanistan 5

30 November 2022
Scorecard

Afghanistan; 313/8 (50 overs)	v	Sri Lanka; 314/6 (49.4 overs)

Sri Lanka won by 4 wickets
Pallekele International Cricket Stadium, Kandy
Points: Sri Lanka 10, Afghanistan 0

==== Pakistan v New Zealand ====
9 January 2023
Scorecard

New Zealand; 255/9 (50 overs)	v	Pakistan; 258/4 (48.1 overs)

Pakistan won by 6 wickets
National Bank Cricket Arena, Karachi
Points: Pakistan 10, New Zealand 0

11 January 2023
Scorecard

New Zealand; 261 (49.5 overs)	v	Pakistan; 182 (43 overs)

New Zealand won by 79 runs
National Bank Cricket Arena, Karachi
Points: New Zealand 10, Pakistan 0

13 January 2023
Scorecard

Pakistan; 280/9 (50 overs)	v	New Zealand; 281/8 (48.1 overs)

New Zealand won by 2 wickets
National Bank Cricket Arena, Karachi
Points: New Zealand 10, Pakistan 0

==== South Africa v England ====
This series was originally scheduled for March–April 2020 but was rescheduled to December 2020 due to the COVID-19 pandemic. England's tour of South Africa was then disrupted in December 2020, following an outbreak of COVID-19 among members of both teams and the hotel staff.

27 January 2023
Scorecard

South Africa; 298/7 (50 overs)	v	England; 271 (44.2 overs)

South Africa won by 27 runs
Mangaung Oval, Bloemfontein
Points: South Africa 10, England 0

29 January 2023
Scorecard

England; 342/7 (50 overs)	v	South Africa; 347/5 (49.1 overs)

South Africa won by 5 wickets
Mangaung Oval, Bloemfontein
Points: South Africa 10, England 0

1 February 2023
Scorecard

England; 346/7 (50 overs)	v	South Africa; 287 (43.1 overs)

England won by 59 runs
Diamond Oval, Kimberley
Points: England 10, South Africa −1

==== Bangladesh v England ====
This series was originally scheduled for September 2021 but was postponed in August 2021. On 3 August 2021, ECB confirmed that the tour has been re-arranged for March 2023. On 27 August 2022, both the cricket boards confirmed the fixtures of the tour.

1 March 2023 (D/N)
Scorecard

Bangladesh; 209 (47.2 overs)	v	England; 212/7 (48.4 overs)

England won by 3 wickets
Sher-e-Bangla National Cricket Stadium, Mirpur
Points: England 10, Bangladesh 0

3 March 2023 (D/N)
Scorecard

England; 326/7 (50 overs)	v	Bangladesh; 194 (44.4 overs)

England won by 132 runs
Sher-e-Bangla National Cricket Stadium, Mirpur
Points: England 10, Bangladesh 0

6 March 2023 (D/N)
Scorecard

Bangladesh; 246 (48.5 overs)	v	England; 196 (43.1 overs)

Bangladesh won by 50 runs
Zahur Ahmed Chowdhury Stadium, Chittagong
Points: Bangladesh 10, England 0

==== Zimbabwe v Netherlands ====
This series was originally scheduled for September 2020 but was postponed due to the COVID-19 pandemic.

21 March 2023
Scorecard

Zimbabwe; 249 (47.3 overs)	v	Netherlands; 255/7 (49.5 overs)

Netherlands won by 3 wickets
Harare Sports Club, Harare
Points: Netherlands 10, Zimbabwe 0

23 March 2023
Scorecard

Zimbabwe; 271 (49.2 overs)	v	Netherlands; 270 (50 overs)

Zimbabwe won by 1 run
Harare Sports Club, Harare
Points: Zimbabwe 10, Netherlands 0

25 March 2023
Scorecard

Netherlands; 231/9 (50 overs)	v	Zimbabwe; 235/3 (41.4 overs)

Zimbabwe won by 7 wickets
Harare Sports Club, Harare
Points: Zimbabwe 10, Netherlands 0

==== New Zealand v Sri Lanka ====
This series was originally scheduled for February 2021 but was postponed due to the COVID-19 pandemic. On 28 June 2022, New Zealand Cricket confirmed that the tour had been re-arranged for March 2023.

25 March 2023 (D/N)
Scorecard

New Zealand; 274 (49.3 overs)	v	Sri Lanka; 76 (19.5 overs)

New Zealand won by 198 runs
Eden Park, Auckland
Points: New Zealand 10, Sri Lanka −1

28 March 2023 (D/N)
Scorecard

New Zealand	v	Sri Lanka

Match abandoned
Hagley Oval, Christchurch
Points: New Zealand 5, Sri Lanka 5

31 March 2023 (D/N)
Scorecard

Sri Lanka; 157 (41.3 overs)	v	New Zealand; 159/4 (32.5 overs)

New Zealand won by 6 wickets
Seddon Park, Hamilton
Points: New Zealand 10, Sri Lanka 0

=== 2023 ===
==== Ireland v Bangladesh ====
This series was originally scheduled for May 2020 but was postponed due to the COVID-19 pandemic.

9 May 2023
Scorecard

Bangladesh; 246/9 (50 overs)	v	Ireland; 65/3 (16.3 overs)

No result
County Cricket Ground, Chelmsford
Points: Ireland 5, Bangladesh 5

12 May 2023
Scorecard

Ireland; 319/6 (45 overs)	v	Bangladesh; 320/7 (44.3 overs)

Bangladesh won by 3 wickets
County Cricket Ground, Chelmsford
Points: Bangladesh 10, Ireland 0

14 May 2023
Scorecard

Bangladesh; 274 (48.5 overs)	v	Ireland; 269/9 (50 overs)

Bangladesh won by 5 runs
County Cricket Ground, Chelmsford
Points: Bangladesh 10, Ireland 0

== See also ==
- 2021–2023 ICC World Test Championship
- 2019–2023 ICC Cricket World Cup League 2
- 2019–2022 ICC Cricket World Cup Challenge League
