= West Indian cricket team in Pakistan in 2022 =

International cricket tour

	Pakistan	West Indies
- Dates: 8 June – 12 June 2022
Captains	Babar Azam	Nicholas Pooran

One Day International series
- Results: Pakistan won the 3-match series 3–0
Most runs	Imam-ul-Haq (199)	Shai Hope (152)
Most wickets	Mohammad Nawaz (7); Shadab Khan (7)	Akeal Hosein (5)
- Player of the series: Imam-ul-Haq (Pak)

The West Indies cricket team toured Pakistan in June 2022 to play three One Day International (ODI) matches. Originally, the matches were scheduled to be played in December 2021, but were postponed after multiple cases of COVID-19 were confirmed in the West Indies team and support staff. The ODI series formed part of the inaugural 2020–23 ICC Cricket World Cup Super League.

On 28 March 2022, the Pakistan Cricket Board (PCB) confirmed the fixtures for the tour, with Rawalpindi initially hosting all three matches. The following month, the PCB also announced that the series would be played without any COVID-19 protocols, meaning that the series was played with no bio-secure bubble. However, in May 2022, the PCB moved all the matches to Multan, due to the ongoing political crisis in the country. The start times of the matches were also moved to 4pm local time to mitigate the impact of the extreme heat. The last time that the ground hosted an ODI match was in April 2008, during Bangladesh's tour of the country.

Pakistan won the opening ODI match by five wickets with their captain Babar Azam scoring a century. Pakistan won the second match by 120 runs to win the series with a match to play. It was also the West Indies' tenth-consecutive series loss to Pakistan in ODI cricket. The third and final ODI match was temporarily suspended during Pakistan's innings due to a dust storm. Despite the interruption, Pakistan went on to win the match by 53 runs, winning the series 3–0.

== Squads ==
ODIs
Pakistan	West Indies
Babar Azam (c); Shadab Khan (vc); Shaheen Afridi; Iftikhar Ahmed; Hasan Ali; Shahnawaz Dahani; Mohammad Haris (wk); Zahid Mahmood; Mohammad Nawaz; Haris Rauf; Mohammad Rizwan (wk); Abdullah Shafique; Khushdil Shah; Imam-ul-Haq; Mohammad Wasim; Fakhar Zaman	Nicholas Pooran (c); Shai Hope (vc); Nkrumah Bonner; Shamarh Brooks; Keacy Carty; Akeal Hosein; Alzarri Joseph; Brandon King; Shermon Lewis; Kyle Mayers; Keemo Paul; Anderson Phillip; Rovman Powell; Jayden Seales; Romario Shepherd; Hayden Walsh Jr.

The day before the first ODI, Keemo Paul was added to the West Indies' squad.

== ODI series ==
=== 1st ODI ===
8 June 2022
16:00 (D/N)
Scorecard

West Indies; 305/8 (50 overs)	v	Pakistan; 306/5 (49.2 overs)
Shai Hope 127 (134); Haris Rauf 4/77 (10 overs)		Babar Azam 103 (107); Alzarri Joseph 2/55 (10 overs)

Pakistan won by 5 wickets
Multan Cricket Stadium, Multan
Umpires: Aleem Dar (Pak) and Ahsan Raza (Pak)
Player of the match: Khushdil Shah (Pak)

- West Indies won the toss and elected to bat.
- Mohammad Haris (Pak) made his ODI debut.
- Shai Hope (WI) scored his 4,000th run in ODIs.
- Babar Azam (Pak) became the fastest captain to score 1,000 runs in ODIs (13 innings), and he became the first batter to score three consecutive ODI centuries twice.
- World Cup Super League points: Pakistan 10, West Indies 0.

=== 2nd ODI ===
10 June 2022
16:00 (D/N)
Scorecard

Pakistan; 275/8 (50 overs)	v	West Indies; 155 (32.2 overs)
Babar Azam 77 (93); Akeal Hosein 3/52 (10 overs)		Shamarh Brooks 42 (56); Mohammad Nawaz 4/19 (10 overs)

Pakistan won by 120 runs
Multan Cricket Stadium, Multan
Umpires: Ahsan Raza (Pak) and Asif Yaqoob (Pak)
Player of the match: Mohammad Nawaz (Pak)

- Pakistan won the toss and elected to bat.
- World Cup Super League points: Pakistan 10, West Indies 0.

=== 3rd ODI ===
12 June 2022
16:00 (D/N)
Scorecard

Pakistan; 269/9 (48 overs)	v	West Indies; 216 (37.2 overs)
Shadab Khan 86 (78); Nicholas Pooran 4/48 (10 overs)		Akeal Hosein 60 (37); Shadab Khan 4/62 (9 overs)

Pakistan won by 53 runs (DLS method)
Multan Cricket Stadium, Multan
Umpires: Aleem Dar (Pak) and Rashid Riaz (Pak)
Player of the match: Shadab Khan (Pak)

- Pakistan won the toss and elected to bat.
- West Indies were set a revised target of 270 runs from 48 overs due to a dust storm.
- Shahnawaz Dahani (Pak) made his ODI debut.
- World Cup Super League points: Pakistan 10, West Indies 0.
