= West Indies women's cricket team in Pakistan in 2021–22 =

International cricket tour

	Pakistan women	West Indies women
- Dates: 8 – 14 November 2021
Captains	Javeria Khan (Note: Sidra Nawaz captained Pakistan for the first WODI.)	Stafanie Taylor

One Day International series
- Results: West Indies women won the 3-match series 3–0
Most runs	Muneeba Ali (103)	Deandra Dottin (170)
Most wickets	Anam Amin (9)	Hayley Matthews (7)
- Player of the series: Hayley Matthews (WI)

The West Indies women's cricket team played the Pakistan women's cricket team in November 2021. The tour consisted of three Women's One Day Internationals (WODIs), with both teams using the matches as practice ahead of the 2021 Women's Cricket World Cup Qualifier tournament in Zimbabwe. Following the tour, the West Indies men's team also toured Pakistan. On 3 November 2021, the West Indies team arrived in Pakistan, with more than 800 security staff assigned to safeguard the players.

Ahead of the series, six players in Pakistan's squad tested positive for COVID-19, but the Pakistan Cricket Board (PCB) confirmed they would have a squad ready for the opening match. As a result, captain Javeria Khan and Diana Baig were ruled out Pakistan's squad for the opening match. Sidra Nawaz was named as Pakistan's captain for the fixture.

The West Indies won the opening match by 45 runs, with Deandra Dottin scoring a century. The West Indies won the second match by 37 runs to win the series with a match to play. The West Indies then won the third and final match by six wickets to win the series 3–0.

== Squads ==
WODIs
Pakistan	West Indies
Javeria Khan (c); Muneeba Ali; Anam Amin; Sidra Ameen; Aiman Anwer; Diana Baig; Nida Dar; Kainat Imtiaz; Sadia Iqbal; Iram Javed; Sidra Nawaz (wk); Aliya Riaz; Fatima Sana; Rameen Shamim; Omaima Sohail; Nashra Sandhu; Maham Tariq; Ayesha Zafar	Stafanie Taylor (c); Anisa Mohammed (vc); Aaliyah Alleyne; Shemaine Campbelle; Shamilia Connell; Deandra Dottin; Sheneta Grimmond; Chinelle Henry; Qiana Joseph; Kycia Knight; Kyshona Knight; Hayley Matthews; Chedean Nation; Shakera Selman; Rashada Williams

Cherry-Ann Fraser, Shabika Gajnabi and Karishma Ramharack were all named as travelling reserves for the West Indies.

== WODI series ==
=== 1st WODI ===
8 November 2021
10:00
Scorecard

West Indies; 253/8 (50 overs)	v	Pakistan; 208/9 (50 overs)
Deandra Dottin 132 (146); Anam Amin 5/35 (10 overs)		Aliya Riaz 46 (60); Hayley Matthews 3/31 (10 overs)

West Indies Women won by 45 runs
National Stadium, Karachi
Umpires: Rashid Riaz (Pak) and Asif Yaqoob (Pak)
Player of the match: Deandra Dottin (WI)

- Pakistan Women won the toss and elected to field.
- Anam Amin (Pak) took her first five-wicket haul in WODIs.

=== 2nd WODI ===
11 November 2021
10:00
Scorecard

West Indies; 153 (45.4 overs)	v	Pakistan; 116 (39.2 overs)
Deandra Dottin 34 (50); Fatima Sana 2/19 (4 overs)		Omaima Sohail 27 (57); Hayley Matthews 4/26 (9 overs)

West Indies Women won by 37 runs
National Stadium, Karachi
Umpires: Faisal Afridi and Asif Yaqoob (Pak)
Player of the match: Hayley Matthews (WI)

- Pakistan Women won the toss and elected to field.

=== 3rd WODI ===
14 November 2021
10:00
Scorecard

Pakistan; 225/7 (50 overs)	v	West Indies; 226/4 (44 overs)
Muneeba Ali 58 (88); Shakera Selman 2/40 (10 overs)		Stafanie Taylor 102* (117); Anam Amin 2/45 (10 overs)

West Indies Women won by 6 wickets
National Stadium, Karachi
Umpires: Rashid Riaz (Pak) and Asif Yaqoob (Pak)
Player of the match: Stafanie Taylor (WI)

- West Indies Women won the toss and elected to field.
- Stafanie Taylor (WI) became the third player to score 5,000 runs in WODIs.
