= Afghan cricket team in Sri Lanka in 2022–23 =

International cricket tour

	Sri Lanka	Afghanistan
- Dates: 25 – 30 November 2022
Captains	Dasun Shanaka	Hashmatullah Shahidi

One Day International series
- Results: 3-match series drawn 1–1
Most runs	Pathum Nissanka (123)	Ibrahim Zadran (278)
Most wickets	Kasun Rajitha (7)	Rashid Khan (5)
- Player of the series: Ibrahim Zadran (Afg)

The Afghanistan cricket team toured Sri Lanka in November 2022 to play three One Day International (ODI) matches. These matches formed part of the inaugural 2020–2023 ICC Cricket World Cup Super League. All three matches were played at the Pallekele International Cricket Stadium. Sri Lanka recovered from losing the first match, and the second encounter ending with no result due to rain, to level the series in the third game.

== Squads ==
Sri Lanka	Afghanistan
Dasun Shanaka (c); Charith Asalanka; Ashen Bandara; Dinesh Chandimal (wk); Dhananjaya de Silva; Asitha Fernando; Nuwanidu Fernando; Wanindu Hasaranga; Lahiru Kumara; Dhananjaya Lakshan; ~~Pramod Madushan~~; Kusal Mendis (wk); Pathum Nissanka; ~~Bhanuka Rajapaksa (wk)~~; Kasun Rajitha; Milan Rathnayake; Maheesh Theekshana; Dunith Wellalage	Hashmatullah Shahidi (c); Rahmat Shah (vc); Fareed Ahmad; Noor Ahmad; Ikram Alikhil (wk); Yamin Ahmadzai; Fazalhaq Farooqi; Rahmanullah Gurbaz (wk); Riaz Hassan; Shahidullah Kamal; Rashid Khan; Mohammad Nabi; Gulbadin Naib; Azmatullah Omarzai; Mujeeb Ur Rahman; Zia-ur-Rehman; Ibrahim Zadran; Najibullah Zadran

Before the start of the series, Bhanuka Rajapaksa withdrew from the Sri Lanka squad, stating that he wished to take a break from the 50-over format. Pramod Madushan was also ruled out of Sri Lanka's squad due to injury; Nuwanidu Fernando and Milan Rathnayake respectively were named as replacements.

== ODI series ==
=== 1st ODI ===
25 November 2022
14:30 (D/N)
Scorecard

Afghanistan; 294/8 (50 overs)	v	Sri Lanka; 234 (38 overs)
Ibrahim Zadran 106 (120); Wanindu Hasaranga 2/42 (10 overs)		Pathum Nissanka 85 (83); Fazalhaq Farooqi 4/49 (9 overs)

Afghanistan won by 60 runs
Pallekele International Cricket Stadium, Pallekele
Umpires: Nitin Menon (Ind) and Ruchira Palliyaguruge (SL)
Player of the match: Ibrahim Zadran (Afg)

- Afghanistan won the toss and elected to bat.
- World Cup Super League points: Afghanistan 10, Sri Lanka 0.

=== 2nd ODI ===
27 November 2022
14:30 (D/N)
Scorecard

Afghanistan; 228 (48.2 overs)	v	Sri Lanka; 10/0 (2.4 overs)
Rahmanullah Gurbaz 68 (73); Kasun Rajitha 3/31 (9 overs)		Pathum Nissanka 3* (8)

No result
Pallekele International Cricket Stadium, Pallekele
Umpires: Nitin Menon (Ind) and Raveendra Wimalasiri (SL)

- Afghanistan won the toss and elected to bat.
- Rain prevented any further play.
- World Cup Super League points: Sri Lanka 5, Afghanistan 5.

=== 3rd ODI ===
30 November 2022
14:30 (D/N)
Scorecard

Afghanistan; 313/8 (50 overs)	v	Sri Lanka; 314/6 (49.4 overs)
Ibrahim Zadran 162 (138); Kasun Rajitha 3/60 (10 overs)		Charith Asalanka 83* (72); Rashid Khan 4/37 (10 overs)

Sri Lanka won by 4 wickets
Pallekele International Cricket Stadium, Pallekele
Umpires: Lyndon Hannibal (SL) and Nitin Menon (Ind)
Player of the match: Charith Asalanka (SL)

- Afghanistan won the toss and elected to bat.
- Noor Ahmad (Afg) made his ODI debut.
- Ibrahim Zadran achieved the highest score for an Afghan batter in ODIs (162).
- World Cup Super League points: Sri Lanka 10, Afghanistan 0.

== Statistics ==
=== Most runs ===
Rank	Runs	Player	Teams	Innings	Average	High Score	100	50
1	278	Ibrahim Zadran	(Afghanistan)	3	92.66	162	2	0
2	132	Rahmat Shah	(Afghanistan)	3	44.00	68	0	2
3	126	Rahmanullah Gurbaz	(Afghanistan)	3	42.00	58	0	2
4	125	Najibullah Zadran	(Afghanistan)	3	41.66	77	0	1
5	123	Pathum Nissanka	(Sri Lanka)	3	61.50	85	0	1
Last Updated: 1 January 2023

=== Most wickets ===
Rank	Wickets	Player	Teams	Innings	Best	Average	Economy
1	7	Kasun Rajitha	(Sri Lanka)	3	3/31	21.00	5.06
2	5	Rashid Khan	(Afghanistan)	2	4/37	15.40	4.27
2	5	Wanindu Hasaranga	(Sri Lanka)	3	2/42	29.60	4.93
3	4	Fazalhaq Farooqi	(Afghanistan)	3	4/49	31.75	6.24
4	3	Gulbadin Naib	(Afghanistan)	2	3/34	27.33	5.85
4	3	Lahiru Kumara	(Sri Lanka)	2	2/50	34.66	7.25
4	3	Maheesh Theekshana	(Sri Lanka)	3	2/49	52.33	5.81
Last Updated: 1 January 2023

Sri Lankan cricket team in India in 2022-23
