= West Indian cricket team in Pakistan in 2021–22 =

International cricket tour

	Pakistan	West Indies
- Dates: 13 – 22 December 2021
Captains	Babar Azam	Shai Hope (ODIs); Nicholas Pooran (T20Is)

One Day International series

Twenty20 International series
- Results: Pakistan won the 3-match series 3–0
Most runs	Mohammad Rizwan (203)	Brandon King (111)
Most wickets	Mohammad Wasim (8)	Odean Smith (4); Romario Shepherd (4)
- Player of the series: Mohammad Rizwan (Pak)

The West Indies cricket team toured Pakistan in December 2021 to play three One Day International (ODI) and three Twenty20 International (T20I) matches. The ODI series would have formed part of the inaugural 2020–23 ICC Cricket World Cup Super League. The fixtures for the tour were confirmed in November 2021. Prior to the tour, the West Indies women's team also toured Pakistan to play three matches.

During the T20I series, multiple cases of COVID-19 were confirmed in the West Indies team and support staff. Despite the T20I matches going ahead as planned, both cricket boards agreed to postpone the ODI series until June 2022.

Kieron Pollard was ruled out of the tour due to an injury he suffered at the 2021 ICC Men's T20 World Cup. Shai Hope and Nicholas Pooran were named as the captains of the West Indies' ODI and T20I squads respectively in Pollard's absence.

Pakistan won the first T20I match by 63 runs. It was their 18th win in the format in 2021, the most by any team in a single calendar year. Pakistan won the second T20I by nine runs, winning the series with one match to play. Pakistan also won the third T20I, by seven wickets, to win the series 3–0. Pakistan's Mohammad Rizwan became the first batter to score 2,000 runs in Twenty20 cricket in a calendar year.

== Squads ==
ODIs		T20Is	
Pakistan	West Indies	Pakistan	West Indies
Babar Azam (c); Shadab Khan (vc); Shaheen Afridi; Iftikhar Ahmed; Asif Ali; Haider Ali; Shahnawaz Dahani; Mohammad Hasnain; Mohammad Nawaz; Usman Qadir; Haris Rauf; Mohammad Rizwan (wk); Khushdil Shah; Saud Shakeel; Imam-ul-Haq; Mohammad Wasim Jr; Fakhar Zaman	~~Kieron Pollard (c)~~; ~~Shai Hope (c)~~; Nicholas Pooran (vc); Darren Bravo; Shamarh Brooks; Roston Chase; ~~Justin Greaves~~; ~~Akeal Hosein~~; Alzarri Joseph; Gudakesh Motie; Anderson Phillip; Raymon Reifer; Romario Shepherd; Odean Smith; Devon Thomas; Hayden Walsh Jr.	Babar Azam (c); Shadab Khan (vc); Iftikhar Ahmed; Shaheen Afridi; Asif Ali; Haider Ali; Shahnawaz Dahani; Mohammad Hasnain; Mohammad Nawaz; Usman Qadir; Haris Rauf; Mohammad Rizwan (wk); Khushdil Shah; Mohammad Wasim Jr; Fakhar Zaman	~~Kieron Pollard (c)~~; Nicholas Pooran (c, wk); Darren Bravo; Shamarh Brooks; ~~Roston Chase~~; ~~Sheldon Cottrell~~; Dominic Drakes; Akeal Hosein; Shai Hope (wk); Brandon King; ~~Kyle Mayers~~; Gudakesh Motie; Rovman Powell; Romario Shepherd; Odean Smith; Devon Thomas; Oshane Thomas; Hayden Walsh Jr.

Abdullah Shafique was named as a reserve player in Pakistan's squad. Kieron Pollard was ruled out of the tour due to a hamstring injury, with Devon Thomas and Rovman Powell being named as replacements in the West Indies' ODI and T20I squads respectively. Sheldon Cottrell, Roston Chase and Kyle Mayers were all ruled out of the West Indies' squad for the T20I matches after testing positive for COVID-19. Ahead of the third T20I, Shai Hope, Akeal Hosein and Justin Greaves of the West Indies all tested positive for COVID-19, ruling them out of the series.

== T20I series ==
=== 1st T20I ===
13 December 2021
18:00 (N)
Scorecard

Pakistan; 200/6 (20 overs)	v	West Indies; 137 (19 overs)
Mohammad Rizwan 78 (52); Romario Shepherd 2/43 (4 overs)		Shai Hope 31 (26); Mohammad Wasim 4/40 (4 overs)

Pakistan won by 63 runs
National Stadium, Karachi
Umpires: Aleem Dar (Pak) and Ahsan Raza (Pak)
Player of the match: Haider Ali (Pak)

- West Indies won the toss and elected to field.
- Shamarh Brooks and Dominic Drakes (WI) both made their T20I debuts.

=== 2nd T20I ===
14 December 2021
18:00 (N)
Scorecard

Pakistan; 172/8 (20 overs)	v	West Indies; 163 (20 overs)
Mohammad Rizwan 38 (30); Odean Smith 2/24 (3 overs)		Brandon King 67 (43); Shaheen Afridi 3/26 (4 overs)

Pakistan won by 9 runs
National Stadium, Karachi
Umpires: Ahsan Raza (Pak) and Asif Yaqoob (Pak)
Player of the match: Shadab Khan (Pak)

- Pakistan won the toss and elected to bat.

=== 3rd T20I ===
16 December 2021
18:00 (N)
Scorecard

West Indies; 207/3 (20 overs)	v	Pakistan; 208/3 (18.5 overs)
Nicholas Pooran 64 (37); Mohammad Wasim 2/44 (4 overs)		Mohammad Rizwan 87 (45); Odean Smith 1/34 (3 overs)

Pakistan won by 7 wickets
National Stadium, Karachi
Umpires: Aleem Dar (Pak) and Rashid Riaz (Pak)
Player of the match: Mohammad Rizwan (Pak)

- West Indies won the toss and elected to bat.
- Gudakesh Motie (WI) made his T20I debut.
- This was Pakistan's highest successful run chase in T20Is.

== ODI series ==
=== 1st ODI ===
18 December 2021
13:00 (D/N)
Scorecard

Pakistan	v	West Indies

National Stadium, Karachi
Umpires: Aleem Dar (Pak) and Asif Yaqoob (Pak)

=== 2nd ODI ===
20 December 2021
13:00 (D/N)
Scorecard

Pakistan	v	West Indies

National Stadium, Karachi
Umpires: Aleem Dar (Pak) and Ahsan Raza (Pak)

=== 3rd ODI ===
22 December 2021
13:00 (D/N)
Scorecard

Pakistan	v	West Indies

National Stadium, Karachi
Umpires: Aleem Dar (Pak) and Rashid Riaz (Pak)
