= Indian cricket team in New Zealand in 2022–23 =

International cricket tour

	New Zealand	India
- Dates: 18 – 30 November 2022
Captains	Kane Williamson (Note: Tim Southee captained New Zealand in the third T20I.)	Shikhar Dhawan (ODIs); Hardik Pandya (T20Is)

One Day International series
- Results: New Zealand won the 3-match series 1–0
Most runs	Tom Latham (145)	Shreyas Iyer (129)
Most wickets	Tim Southee (5)	Umran Malik (3)
- Player of the series: Tom Latham (NZ)

Twenty20 International series
- Results: India won the 3-match series 1–0
Most runs	Devon Conway (84)	Suryakumar Yadav (124)
Most wickets	Tim Southee (5)	Mohammed Siraj (6)
- Player of the series: Suryakumar Yadav (Ind)

The India cricket team toured New Zealand in November 2022 to play three One Day Internationals (ODIs) and three Twenty20 International (T20I) matches. The ODI series formed part of the inaugural 2020–2023 ICC Cricket World Cup Super League.

== Squads ==
ODIs		T20Is	
New Zealand	India	New Zealand	India
Kane Williamson (c); Finn Allen; Michael Bracewell; Devon Conway; Lockie Ferguson; Matt Henry; Tom Latham (wk); Daryl Mitchell; Adam Milne; James Neesham; Henry Nicholls; Glenn Phillips; Mitchell Santner; Tim Southee	Shikhar Dhawan (c); Rishabh Pant (vc),(wk); ~~Shahbaz Ahmed~~; Yuzvendra Chahal; Deepak Chahar; Shubman Gill; Deepak Hooda; Shreyas Iyer; Umran Malik; Sanju Samson(wk); ~~Kuldeep Sen~~; Arshdeep Singh; Washington Sundar; Shardul Thakur; Kuldeep Yadav; Suryakumar Yadav	Kane Williamson (c); Finn Allen; Michael Bracewell; Mark Chapman; Devon Conway (wk); Lockie Ferguson; Daryl Mitchell; Adam Milne; James Neesham; Glenn Phillips; Mitchell Santner; Ish Sodhi; Tim Southee; Blair Tickner	Hardik Pandya (c); Rishabh Pant (vc),(wk); Yuzvendra Chahal; Shubman Gill; Deepak Hooda; Shreyas Iyer; Ishan Kishan (wk); Bhuvneshwar Kumar; Umran Malik; Harshal Patel; Sanju Samson (wk); Arshdeep Singh; Mohammed Siraj; Washington Sundar; Kuldeep Yadav; Suryakumar Yadav

New Zealand Cricket (NZC) also announced that James Neesham would miss the third ODI as he prepared for his wedding, with Henry Nicholls being named as his replacement for the match. Mark Chapman was added to New Zealand's T20I squad before the third T20I as cover for Kane Williamson, who was announced to be unavailable for the match. On 23 November 2022, Shahbaz Ahmed and Kuldeep Sen were confirmed to be unavailable for selection in India's squad for the ODI series.

== T20I series ==
=== 1st T20I ===
18 November 2022
19:30 (D/N)
Scorecard

New Zealand	v	India

Match abandoned
Wellington Regional Stadium, Wellington
Umpires: Chris Brown (NZ) and Wayne Knights (NZ)

- No toss.
- No play was possible due to rain.

=== 2nd T20I ===
20 November 2022
19:30 (D/N)
Scorecard

India; 191/6 (20 overs)	v	New Zealand; 126 (18.5 overs)
Suryakumar Yadav 111* (51); Tim Southee 3/34 (4 overs)		Kane Williamson 61 (52); Deepak Hooda 4/10 (2.5 overs)

India won by 65 runs
Bay Oval, Mount Maunganui
Umpires: Chris Gaffaney (NZ) and Wayne Knights (NZ)
Player of the match: Suryakumar Yadav (Ind)

- New Zealand won the toss and elected to field.
- Deepak Hooda recorded the best T20I bowling figures against New Zealand with four wickets.
- Suryakumar Yadav scored his second T20I century of the calendar year.
- Tim Southee took a hat-trick in the final over of the match.

=== 3rd T20I ===
22 November 2022
19:30 (D/N)
Scorecard

New Zealand; 160 (19.4 overs)	v	India; 75/4 (9 overs)
Devon Conway 59 (49); Mohammed Siraj 4/17 (4 overs)		Hardik Pandya 30* (18); Tim Southee 2/27 (3 overs)

Match tied (DLS method)
McLean Park, Napier
Umpires: Chris Brown (NZ) and Chris Gaffaney (NZ)
Player of the match: Mohammed Siraj (Ind)

- New Zealand won the toss and elected to bat.
- No further play was possible due to rain.

== ODI series ==
=== 1st ODI ===
25 November 2022
14:30 (D/N)
Scorecard

India; 306/7 (50 overs)	v	New Zealand; 309/3 (47.1 overs)
Shreyas Iyer 80 (76); Lockie Ferguson 3/59 (10 overs)		Tom Latham 145* (104); Umran Malik 2/66 (10 overs)

New Zealand won by 7 wickets
Eden Park, Auckland
Umpires: Chris Brown (NZ) and Chris Gaffaney (NZ)
Player of the match: Tom Latham (NZ)

- New Zealand won the toss and elected to field.
- Umran Malik and Arshdeep Singh (Ind) both made their ODI debuts.
- Tim Southee (NZ) took his 200th wicket in ODIs.
- Tom Latham broke Nathan Astle's (120) record for the highest individual score against India in ODIs (145).
- World Cup Super League points: New Zealand 10, India 0.

=== 2nd ODI ===
27 November 2022
14:30 (D/N)
Scorecard

India; 89/1 (12.5 overs)	v	New Zealand
Shubman Gill 45* (42); Matt Henry 1/20 (4 overs)

No result
Seddon Park, Hamilton
Umpires: Chris Gaffaney (NZ) and Wayne Knights (NZ)

- New Zealand won the toss and elected to field.
- No further play was possible due to rain.
- World Cup Super League points: New Zealand 5, India 5.

=== 3rd ODI ===
30 November 2022
14:40 (D/N)
Scorecard

India; 219 (47.3 overs)	v	New Zealand; 104/1 (18 overs)
Washington Sundar 51 (64); Daryl Mitchell 3/25 (7 overs)		Finn Allen 57 (54); Umran Malik 1/31 (5 overs)

No result
Hagley Oval, Christchurch
Umpires: Chris Brown (NZ) and Chris Gaffaney (NZ)

- New Zealand won the toss and elected to field.
- No further play was possible due to rain.
- World Cup Super League points: New Zealand 5, India 5.
