= Bangladeshi cricket team against Ireland in England in 2023 =

International cricket tour

Bangladeshi cricket team against Ireland in 2023
	Ireland	Bangladesh
- Dates: 9 – 14 May 2023
Captains	Andrew Balbirnie	Tamim Iqbal

One Day International series
- Results: Bangladesh won the 3-match series 2–0
Most runs	Harry Tector (206)	Najmul Hossain Shanto (196)
Most wickets	Mark Adair (7)	Hasan Mahmud (5)
- Player of the series: Najmul Hossain Shanto (Ban)

The Bangladesh cricket team toured England in May 2023 to play three One Day International (ODI) matches against the Ireland cricket team. The ODI matches formed part of the inaugural 2020–2023 ICC Cricket World Cup Super League.

In March 2023, Cricket Ireland (CI) confirmed that all three ODIs would be played at Chelmsford in England. This was due to better weather in England than in Ireland, leading to a better chance of full matches being played to a result.

Going into the series, Ireland needed to win all three matches to claim the eighth and final automatic place in the 2023 Cricket World Cup at the expense of South Africa. South Africa's qualification for the World Cup was confirmed when the first ODI ended with no result due to rain. The result meant that Ireland had to go through the 2023 Cricket World Cup Qualifier to qualify for the 2023 Cricket World Cup.

The first ODI ended in a no result due to rain. Bangladesh won the series 2–0.

== Background ==
The Bangladesh team were scheduled to tour Ireland and England in May 2020 to play three ODIs and four Twenty20 International (T20I) matches, with the T20I matches scheduled to take place in England. It would have been the first time that Ireland hosted a series at a neutral venue.

Originally, the tour was scheduled to include a one-off Test match and three T20I matches. However, the Test match was cancelled, with another T20I match added to the tour itinerary. Cricket Ireland made the decision based on the lack of context for the one-off match, and the costs associated of hosting it. A planned home T20I series against Afghanistan was also cancelled by Cricket Ireland. Cricket Ireland confirmed the fixtures for ODI series in December 2019. In December 2019, Cricket Ireland looked at the possibility of hosting the T20I matches in England. In February 2020, the T20Is were confirmed to be taking place in England, along with the dates for the four matches. The venues in England were confirmed the following month. However, on 21 March 2020, the matches were postponed due to the COVID-19 pandemic.

In November 2021, the Bangladesh Cricket Board (BCB) announced that they would play the three ODI matches in Ireland in May 2022, with the aim to play the T20I matches at some point during 2023. In March 2022, as a result of the impact from the pandemic, the International Cricket Council (ICC) agreed to extend the cut-off date for the Cricket World Cup Super League from March 2023 to May 2023, allowing this series to take place.

== Squads ==
Ireland	Bangladesh
Andrew Balbirnie (c); Mark Adair; Curtis Campher; Gareth Delany; George Dockrell; Stephen Doheny; Fionn Hand; Graham Hume; Josh Little; Andy McBrine; Paul Stirling; Harry Tector; Lorcan Tucker (wk); Craig Young	Tamim Iqbal (c); Yasir Ali; Shakib Al Hasan; Mrittunjoy Chowdhury; Litton Das; Mehidy Hasan; Ebadot Hossain; Towhid Hridoy; Shoriful Islam; Taijul Islam; Hasan Mahmud; Mushfiqur Rahim; Mustafizur Rahman; Najmul Hossain Shanto; Rony Talukdar

== Tour match ==
Ahead of the series, Bangladesh were scheduled to play a 50-over warm up match against the Ireland Wolves side, with the match being played behind closed doors. However, the match was abandoned due to rain.

5 May 2023
10:45

Ireland Wolves	v	Bangladesh

Match abandoned
Fenner's, Cambridge

- No toss.
- No play was possible due to rain.

== ODI series ==
=== 1st ODI ===
9 May 2023
10:45
Scorecard

Bangladesh; 246/9 (50 overs)	v	Ireland; 65/3 (16.3 overs)
Mushfiqur Rahim 61 (70); Josh Little 3/61 (10 overs)		Harry Tector 21* (37); Taijul Islam 1/5 (2 overs)

No result
County Cricket Ground, Chelmsford
Umpires: Roland Black (Ire) and Michael Gough (Eng)

- Ireland won the toss and elected to field.
- No further play was possible due to rain.
- World Cup Super League points: Ireland 5, Bangladesh 5.

=== 2nd ODI ===
12 May 2023
10:45
Scorecard

Ireland; 319/6 (45 overs)	v	Bangladesh; 320/7 (44.3 overs)
Harry Tector 140 (113); Hasan Mahmud 2/48 (9 overs)		Najmul Hossain Shanto 117 (93); George Dockrell 2/58 (9 overs)

Bangladesh won by 3 wickets
County Cricket Ground, Chelmsford
Umpires: Adrian Holdstock (SA) and Paul Reynolds (Ire)
Player of the match: Najmul Hossain Shanto (Ban)

- Bangladesh won the toss and elected to field.
- The match was reduced to 45 overs per side due to rain.
- George Dockrell (Ire) scored his 1,000th run in ODIs.
- Najmul Hossain Shanto (Ban) scored his first century in ODIs.
- World Cup Super League points: Bangladesh 10, Ireland 0.

=== 3rd ODI ===
14 May 2023
10:45
Scorecard

Bangladesh; 274 (48.5 overs)	v	Ireland; 269/9 (50 overs)
Tamim Iqbal 69 (82); Mark Adair 4/40 (8.5 overs)		Paul Stirling 60 (73); Mustafizur Rahman 4/44 (10 overs)

Bangladesh won by 5 runs
County Cricket Ground, Chelmsford
Umpires: Roland Black (Ire) and Michael Gough (Eng)
Player of the match: Mustafizur Rahman (Ban)

- Ireland won the toss and elected to field.
- Mrittunjoy Chowdhury and Rony Talukdar (Ban) both made their ODI debuts.
- World Cup Super League points: Bangladesh 10, Ireland 0.
