= Afghan cricket team in Bangladesh in 2021–22 =

International cricket tour

	Bangladesh	Afghanistan
- Dates: 23 February – 5 March 2022
Captains	Tamim Iqbal (ODIs); Mahmudullah (T20Is)	Hashmatullah Shahidi (ODIs); Mohammad Nabi (T20Is)

One Day International series
- Results: Bangladesh won the 3-match series 2–1
Most runs	Litton Das (223)	Rahmat Shah (133)
Most wickets	Shakib Al Hasan (5)	Fazalhaq Farooqi (6)
- Player of the series: Litton Das (Ban)

Twenty20 International series
- Results: 2-match series drawn 1–1
Most runs	Litton Das (73)	Hazratullah Zazai (65)
Most wickets	Nasum Ahmed (4)	Fazalhaq Farooqi (5); Azmatullah Omarzai (5)
- Player of the series: Fazalhaq Farooqi (Afg)

The Afghanistan cricket team toured Bangladesh in February and March 2022 to play three One Day International (ODI) and two Twenty20 International (T20I) matches. The ODI series formed part of the inaugural 2020–2023 ICC Cricket World Cup Super League. On 1 February 2022, the Bangladesh Cricket Board (BCB) confirmed the schedule for the tour. The ODI matches were played in Chittagong, and the T20I matches in Dhaka.

On 13 February 2022, the Afghanistan team arrived in Sylhet to begin a week-long training camp ahead of the matches. However, shortly after the team arrived, eight Afghan cricketers and three members of their support staff tested positive for COVID-19. As a result, the entire touring party was asked to go into isolation for 48 hours before fresh tests were conducted. On 16 February 2022, all of Afghanistan's touring party returned negative COVID-19 tests. The team had requested a second round of testing after they believed the first round returned false positives.

In the first ODI, Afghanistan made 215 runs in their innings. In reply, Bangladesh were reduced to 45/6 in the twelfth over of their run chase, with Fazalhaq Farooqi taking four wickets. However, Afif Hossain and Mehidy Hasan then made an unbeaten 174-run partnership, with Bangladesh reaching 219/6 to win the match by four wickets. The 174-run stand between Afif Hossain and Mehidy Hasan was the highest seventh-wicket partnership for Bangladesh in an ODI match, and the second-highest seventh-wicket partnership in ODI cricket.

In the second ODI, Litton Das and Mushfiqur Rahim set a new third-wicket partnership record for Bangladesh, with 202 runs. Bangladesh went on to beat Afghanistan by 88 runs, winning the series with a match to play. Afghanistan won the third ODI by seven wickets, with Rahmanullah Gurbaz scoring an unbeaten century. Bangladesh won the ODI series 2–1.

The T20I series was drawn 1–1. Bangladesh had won the first T20I match by 61 runs, after making 155/8 in their innings, and bowling Afghanistan out for 94 runs. Afghanistan won the second T20I match by eight wickets.

== Squads ==
ODIs		T20Is	
Bangladesh	Afghanistan	Bangladesh	Afghanistan
Tamim Iqbal (c); Nasum Ahmed; Taskin Ahmed; Yasir Ali; Litton Das; Mehidy Hasan; Shakib Al Hasan; Afif Hossain; Ebadot Hossain; Shoriful Islam; Mahmudul Hasan Joy; Mahmudullah; Mushfiqur Rahim; Mustafizur Rahman; Najmul Hossain Shanto	Hashmatullah Shahidi (c); Rahmat Shah (vc); Fareed Ahmad; Yamin Ahmadzai; Ikram Alikhil; Fazalhaq Farooqi; Rahmanullah Gurbaz; Riaz Hassan; Rashid Khan; Azmatullah Omarzai; Mohammad Nabi; Gulbadin Naib; Mujeeb Ur Rahman; Shahidullah; Ibrahim Zadran; Najibullah Zadran	Mahmudullah (c); Nasum Ahmed; Taskin Ahmed; Yasir Ali; Litton Das; Mahedi Hasan; Nurul Hasan; Shakib Al Hasan; Afif Hossain; Shohidul Islam; Shoriful Islam; Mohammad Naim; Mushfiqur Rahim; Mustafizur Rahman; Munim Shahriar	Mohammad Nabi (c); Fareed Ahmad; Qais Ahmad; Sharafuddin Ashraf; Fazalhaq Farooqi; Usman Ghani; Rahmanullah Gurbaz; Karim Janat; Rashid Khan; Nijat Masood; Azmatullah Omarzai; Mujeeb Ur Rahman; Darwish Rasooli; Najibullah Zadran; Afsar Zazai; Hazratullah Zazai

Qais Ahmad and Mohammad Saleem were both named as travelling reserves in Afghanistan's team for the ODI matches. Prior to the first T20I match, Nurul Hasan was added to Bangladesh's squad, after Mushfiqur Rahim suffered an injury.

== ODI series ==
=== 1st ODI ===
23 February 2022
11:00
Scorecard

Afghanistan; 215 (49.1 overs)	v	Bangladesh; 219/6 (48.5 overs)
Najibullah Zadran 67 (84); Mustafizur Rahman 3/35 (9.1 overs)		Afif Hossain 93* (115); Fazalhaq Farooqi 4/54 (10 overs)

Bangladesh won by 4 wickets
Zohur Ahmed Chowdhury Stadium, Chittagong
Umpires: Masudur Rahman (Ban) and Gazi Sohel (Ban)
Player of the match: Mehidy Hasan (Ban)

- Afghanistan won the toss and elected to bat.
- Yasir Ali (Ban) made his ODI debut.
- Shakib Al Hasan (Ban) became the first player to take 100 wickets across all three formats of international cricket at the Zohur Ahmed Chowdhury Stadium.
- World Cup Super League points: Bangladesh 10, Afghanistan 0.

=== 2nd ODI ===
25 February 2022
11:00
Scorecard

Bangladesh; 306/4 (50 overs)	v	Afghanistan; 218 (45.1 overs)
Litton Das 136 (126); Fareed Ahmad 2/56 (8 overs)		Najibullah Zadran 54 (61); Shakib Al Hasan 2/29 (9 overs)

Bangladesh won by 88 runs
Zohur Ahmed Chowdhury Stadium, Chittagong
Umpires: Tanvir Ahmed (Ban) and Masudur Rahman (Ban)
Player of the match: Litton Das (Ban)

- Bangladesh won the toss and elected to bat.
- Mushfiqur Rahim (Ban) scored his 13,000th run in international cricket across all formats.
- World Cup Super League points: Bangladesh 10, Afghanistan 0.

=== 3rd ODI ===
28 February 2022
11:00
Scorecard

Bangladesh; 192 (46.5 overs)	v	Afghanistan; 193/3 (40.1 overs)
Litton Das 86 (113); Rashid Khan 3/37 (10 overs)		Rahmanullah Gurbaz 106* (110); Mehidy Hasan 2/37 (8.1 overs)

Afghanistan won by 7 wickets
Zohur Ahmed Chowdhury Stadium, Chittagong
Umpires: Tanvir Ahmed (Ban) and Gazi Sohel (Ban)
Player of the match: Rahmanullah Gurbaz (Afg)

- Bangladesh won the toss and elected to bat.
- World Cup Super League points: Afghanistan 10, Bangladesh 0.
- Rashid Khan (Afg) took his 150th wicket in ODIs.

== T20I series ==
=== 1st T20I ===
3 March 2022
15:00 (D/N)
Scorecard

Bangladesh; 155/8 (20 overs)	v	Afghanistan; 94 (17.4 overs)
Litton Das 60 (44); Fazalhaq Farooqi 2/27 (4 overs)		Najibullah Zadran 27 (26); Nasum Ahmed 4/10 (4 overs)

Bangladesh won by 61 runs
Sher-e-Bangla National Cricket Stadium, Dhaka
Umpires: Tanvir Ahmed (Ban) and Masudur Rahman (Ban)
Player of the match: Nasum Ahmed (Ban)

- Bangladesh won the toss and elected to bat.
- Yasir Ali, Munim Shahriar (Ban), Azmatullah Omarzai and Darwish Rasooli (Afg) all made their T20I debuts.
- Akhtar Ahmed made his international debut as a match referee.

=== 2nd T20I ===
5 March 2022
15:00 (D/N)
Scorecard

Bangladesh; 115/9 (20 overs)	v	Afghanistan; 121/2 (17.4 overs)
Mushfiqur Rahim 30 (25); Fazalhaq Farooqi 3/18 (4 overs)		Hazratullah Zazai 59* (45); Mahmudullah 1/2 (1 over)

Afghanistan won by 8 wickets
Sher-e-Bangla National Cricket Stadium, Dhaka
Umpires: Masudur Rahman (Ban) and Gazi Sohel (Ban)
Player of the match: Azmatullah Omarzai (Afg)

- Bangladesh won the toss and elected to bat.
- Mushfiqur Rahim (Ban) played in his 100th T20I match.
- Mahmudullah became the first cricketer for Bangladesh to score 2,000 runs in T20Is.
