= Australian cricket team in the West Indies in 2021 =

International cricket tour

	West Indies	Australia
- Dates: 9 – 26 July 2021
Captains	Nicholas Pooran (T20Is) (Note: While Kieron Pollard was named captain of the West Indies for the first four T20Is, Pooran went on to captain in all the five T20Is.); Kieron Pollard (ODIs)	Aaron Finch (T20Is); Alex Carey (ODIs)

One Day International series
- Results: Australia won the 3-match series 2–1
Most runs	Kieron Pollard (69)	Alex Carey (112)
Most wickets	Hayden Walsh Jr. (7)	Mitchell Starc (11)
- Player of the series: Mitchell Starc (Aus)

Twenty20 International series
- Results: West Indies won the 5-match series 4–1
Most runs	Lendl Simmons (165)	Mitchell Marsh (219)
Most wickets	Hayden Walsh Jr. (12)	Mitchell Marsh (8)
- Player of the series: Hayden Walsh Jr. (WI)

The Australia cricket team toured the West Indies in June and July 2021 to play three One Day International (ODI) and five Twenty20 International (T20I) matches. The ODI matches formed part of the inaugural 2020–2023 ICC Cricket World Cup Super League. The fixtures for the tour were confirmed by Cricket West Indies (CWI) in May 2021. The Australian cricket team arrived in the West Indies on 28 May 2021, after the majority players had been vaccinated for COVID-19.

The West Indies won the first three T20I matches to win the series. Australia won the fourth T20I by four runs, and the West Indies won the fifth T20I by 16 runs, to win the series 4–1. In the third T20I, Chris Gayle became the first batsman to score 14,000 runs in Twenty20 cricket.

Australia won the first ODI by 133 runs to take a 1–0 lead in the series. The second ODI was suspended after the toss took place, following a positive test for COVID-19. CWI later confirmed that the match had been suspended after a non-playing member of their staff had provided the positive test. On 23 July 2021, CWI announced the rescheduled fixtures for the second and third ODIs. The second ODI match eventually took place on 24 July 2021, with the West Indies winning by four wickets to level the series. Australia won the third ODI by six wickets to win the series 2–1.

== Squads ==
West Indies		Australia
ODIs	T20Is	ODIs and T20Is
Kieron Pollard (c); Shai Hope (vc); Fabian Allen; Darren Bravo; ~~Roston Chase~~; Sheldon Cottrell; Shimron Hetmyer; Jason Holder; Akeal Hosein; Alzarri Joseph; Evin Lewis; Jason Mohammed; Anderson Phillip; Nicholas Pooran (wk); Romario Shepherd; Hayden Walsh Jr.	Kieron Pollard (c); Nicholas Pooran (vc, wk); Fabian Allen; Darren Bravo; Dwayne Bravo; Sheldon Cottrell; Fidel Edwards; Andre Fletcher; Chris Gayle; Shimron Hetmyer; Akeal Hosein; Evin Lewis; Obed McCoy; Andre Russell; Lendl Simmons; Kevin Sinclair; Oshane Thomas; Hayden Walsh Jr.	Aaron Finch (c, T20Is); Alex Carey (c, wk, ODIs); Ashton Agar; Wes Agar; Jason Behrendorff; Dan Christian; Josh Hazlewood; Moises Henriques; Mitchell Marsh; Ben McDermott; Riley Meredith; Josh Philippe; Mitchell Starc; Mitchell Swepson; Ashton Turner; Andrew Tye; Matthew Wade (wk); Adam Zampa

On 17 May 2021, Australia named a 23-man preliminary squad for the tour with Aaron Finch being named as their captain. On 8 June 2021, six more players were added to Australia's preliminary squad. Australia did not name individual squads for the ODI and T20I matches, opting instead to name a combined squad of 18 players for the tour. Tanveer Sangha and Nathan Ellis were named as reserve players. Ahead of the first ODI, Alex Carey was named captain of Australia. On 25 July 2021, Australia's captain Aaron Finch was ruled out of the ODI series due to an injury.

On 18 May 2021, Cricket West Indies (CWI) named a 18-man provisional squad for the T20I matches, with Kieron Pollard captaining the team. On 7 July 2021, CWI named a 15-member squad for the ODI matches. Ahead of the third T20I, Oshane Thomas was added to the West Indies' squad. For the fourth and fifth T20Is, CWI added Akeal Hosein and Kevin Sinclair to their squad. They replaced Shimron Hetmyer and Obed McCoy who both had minor injuries. For the last T20I, CWI added Darren Bravo to their squad. Roston Chase was ruled out of the ODI series, with Hayden Walsh Jr. replacing him in the West Indies' ODI squad.

== Practice matches ==
Ahead of the T20I matches, the Australian team played two intra-squad games at the Daren Sammy Cricket Ground in Saint Lucia.

5 July 2021
Scorecard

Australia II; 193/5 (22 overs)	v	Australia I 195/6 (21.4 overs)
Dan Christian 47 (31); Riley Meredith 2/39 (4 overs)		Mitchell Marsh 56 (28); Josh Hazlewood 2/44 (4 overs)

Australia I won by 4 wickets
Daren Sammy Cricket Ground, Saint Lucia

7 July 2021
Scorecard

Australia I 165/6 (20 overs)	v	Australia II; 166/2 (17.3 overs)
Matthew Wade 52 (34); Mitchell Starc 3/30 (4 overs)		Josh Philippe 67 (43); Mitchell Marsh 1/17 (1.3 overs)

Australia II won by 8 wickets
Daren Sammy Cricket Ground, Saint Lucia

== T20I series ==
=== 1st T20I ===
9 July 2021
19:30 (N)
Scorecard

West Indies; 145/6 (20 overs)	v	Australia; 127 (16 overs)
Andre Russell 51 (28); Josh Hazlewood 3/12 (4 overs)		Mitchell Marsh 51 (31); Obed McCoy 4/26 (4 overs)

West Indies won by 18 runs
Daren Sammy Cricket Ground, Saint Lucia
Umpires: Nigel Duguid (WI) and Patrick Gustard (WI)
Player of the match: Obed McCoy (WI)

- Australia won the toss and elected to field.
- Nicholas Pooran captained the West Indies for the first time in T20Is.

=== 2nd T20I ===
10 July 2021
19:30 (N)
Scorecard

West Indies; 196/4 (20 overs)	v	Australia; 140 (19.2 overs)
Shimron Hetmyer 61 (36); Mitchell Marsh 1/18 (2 overs)		Mitchell Marsh 54 (42); Hayden Walsh Jr. 3/29 (4 overs)

West Indies won by 56 runs
Daren Sammy Cricket Ground, Saint Lucia
Umpires: Gregory Brathwaite (WI) and Joel Wilson (WI)
Player of the match: Shimron Hetmyer (WI)

- Australia won the toss and elected to field.

=== 3rd T20I ===
12 July 2021
19:30 (N)
Scorecard

Australia; 141/6 (20 overs)	v	West Indies; 142/4 (14.5 overs)
Moises Henriques 33 (29); Hayden Walsh Jr. 2/18 (4 overs)		Chris Gayle 67 (38); Riley Meredith 3/48 (3.5 overs)

West Indies won by 6 wickets
Daren Sammy Cricket Ground, Saint Lucia
Umpires: Leslie Reifer (WI) and Joel Wilson (WI)
Player of the match: Chris Gayle (WI)

- Australia won the toss and elected to bat.
- Chris Gayle (WI) scored his 14,000th run in T20 cricket.

=== 4th T20I ===
14 July 2021
19:30 (N)
Scorecard

Australia; 189/6 (20 overs)	v	West Indies; 185/6 (20 overs)
Mitchell Marsh 75 (44); Hayden Walsh Jr. 3/27 (4 overs)		Lendl Simmons 72 (48); Mitchell Marsh 3/24 (4 overs)

Australia won by 4 runs
Daren Sammy Cricket Ground, Saint Lucia
Umpires: Gregory Brathwaite (WI) and Patrick Gustard (WI)
Player of the match: Mitchell Marsh (Aus)

- Australia won the toss and elected to bat.

=== 5th T20I ===
16 July 2021
19:30 (N)
Scorecard

West Indies; 199/8 (20 overs)	v	Australia; 183/9 (20 overs)
Evin Lewis 79 (34); Andrew Tye 3/37 (4 overs)		Aaron Finch 34 (23); Sheldon Cottrell 3/28 (4 overs)

West Indies won by 16 runs
Daren Sammy Cricket Ground, Saint Lucia
Umpires: Nigel Duguid (WI) and Leslie Reifer (WI)
Player of the match: Evin Lewis (WI)

- West Indies won the toss and elected to bat.

== ODI series ==
=== 1st ODI ===
20 July 2021
14:30 (D/N)
Scorecard

Australia; 252/9 (49 overs)	v	West Indies; 123 (26.2 overs)
Alex Carey 67 (87); Hayden Walsh Jr. 5/39 (10 overs)		Kieron Pollard 56 (57); Mitchell Starc 5/48 (8 overs)

Australia won by 133 runs (DLS method)
Kensington Oval, Barbados
Umpires: Gregory Brathwaite (WI) and Joel Wilson (WI)
Player of the match: Mitchell Starc (Aus)

- Australia won the toss and elected to bat.
- West Indies were set a revised target of 257 runs from 49 overs due to rain.
- Wes Agar, Ben McDermott and Josh Philippe (Aus) all made their ODI debuts.
- Alex Carey captained Australia for the first time in ODIs.
- Hayden Walsh Jr. (WI) took his first five-wicket haul in ODIs.
- World Cup Super League points: Australia 10, West Indies 0.

=== 2nd ODI ===
22–24 July 2021 (Note: The toss for the second ODI took place on 22 July, with play being suspended due to a positive COVID-19 case. Per the ICC's playing conditions, play resumed on 24 July from when the toss occurred, as the match was not abandoned.)
14:30 (D/N)
Scorecard

Australia; 187 (47.1 overs)	v	West Indies; 191/6 (38 overs)
Wes Agar 41 (36); Akeal Hosein 3/30 (10 overs)		Nicholas Pooran 59* (75); Mitchell Starc 3/26 (10 overs)

West Indies won by 4 wickets
Kensington Oval, Barbados
Umpires: Nigel Duguid (WI) and Joel Wilson (WI)
Player of the match: Nicholas Pooran (WI)

- Australia won the toss and elected to bat.
- The match was suspended on 22 July due to a positive COVID-19 case, and restarted on 24 July.
- Riley Meredith (Aus) made his ODI debut.
- World Cup Super League points: West Indies 10, Australia 0.

=== 3rd ODI ===
26 July 2021
14:30 (D/N)
Scorecard

West Indies; 152 (45.1 overs)	v	Australia; 153/4 (30.3 overs)
Evin Lewis 55* (66); Mitchell Starc 3/43 (9.1 overs)		Matthew Wade 51* (52); Alzarri Joseph 1/14 (3 overs)

Australia won by 6 wickets
Kensington Oval, Barbados
Umpires: Leslie Reifer (WI) and Joel Wilson (WI)
Player of the match: Ashton Agar (Aus)

- West Indies won the toss and elected to bat.
- World Cup Super League points: Australia 10, West Indies 0.
