= Yannic Cariah =

West Indian cricketer (born 1992)

Personal information
- Born: 22 June 1992 (age 34); Trinidad
- Batting: Left-handed
- Bowling: Right-arm leg spin

International information
- National side: West Indies
- ODI debut (cap 214): 17 August 2022 v New Zealand
- Last ODI: 3 Dec 2023 v England
- T20I debut (cap 92): 5 October 2022 v Australia
- Last T20I: 7 October 2022 v Australia

Domestic team information
- Years: Team
- 2010/11–present: Trinidad and Tobago
- 2013, 2016: Trinbago Knight Riders
- 2023: St Kitts and Nevis Patriots
- 2024: Fortune Barishal

Career statistics
Competition	ODI	T20I	FC	LA
Matches	6	2	71	22
Runs scored	59	3	2,923	255
Batting average	53.00	–	28.37	28.34
100s/50s	0/1	0/0	5/11	0/2
Top score	52	2*	196	73
Balls bowled	150	36	3,163	675
Wickets	3	1	57	26
Bowling average	50.66	43.00	32.87	22.38
5 wickets in innings	0	0	2	1
10 wickets in match	0	0	0	0
Best bowling	2/77	1/15	5/46	5/44
Catches/stumpings	0/–	0/–	32/–	1/–
- Source: CricketArchive, 6 June 2023

Yannic Cariah (born 22 June 1992) is a Trinidadian cricketer who has played for Trinidad and Tobago in West Indian domestic cricket, as well as representing the Trinidad and Tobago Red Steel in the Caribbean Premier League (CPL). He has played for the West Indies cricket team since 2022.

== Biography ==
He hails from a rural village of Coalmine, Sangre Grande. He was also mentored by former Trinidadian leg spinner Samuel Badree and also honed the skills of mastering the craft of leg spin by watching the videos of veteran leggie Shane Warne. He also worked on his batting skills by watching the videos of veteran batsman Brian Lara.

== Domestic career ==
Cariah represented the West Indies under-19s at the 2010 Under-19 World Cup in New Zealand. His tournament included an innings of 110 not out against Sri Lanka in the third-place play-off. He was also the only centurion for West Indies during the 2010 U-19 World Cup. He was the second highest wicket-taker for the West Indies U-19 team during the 2010 ICC U-19 World Cup just behind Jason Holder's 12 scalps after finishing the tournament with eight wickets in six matches including an economy rate of 4.21 at an average of 20 and was a key member of West Indies U-19 side which reached the semi-finals during that tournament.

A left-handed batsman and right-arm leg-spin bowler, Cariah had made his List A debut in October 2009, playing for the West Indies under-19s in the 2009–10 WICB President's Cup. His first-class debut for Trinidad and Tobago came in February 2011, against the Windward Islands in the 2010–11 Regional Four Day Competition. In his fourth match, Cariah took a maiden first-class five-wicket haul, 5/46 against Guyana. He also recorded a five-wicket haul in the opening match of the 2012–13 Regional Super50 (a limited-overs tournament), taking 5/44 against the Windward Islands. However, he struggled to hold his spot as a legspinner in the domestic circuit due to the availability of many first-choice spinners and he decided to focus more on his batting.

He was bought by Trinidad and Tobago Red Steel for the inaugural edition of the Caribbean Premier League in 2013. He subsequently made his T20 debut during the 2013 edition of the CPL during a match against Guyana Amazon Warriors but he did not either bat or ball on his CPL debut as Red Steel secured a thrilling three run victory albeit of a batting masterclass from Kevin O'Brien who topscored for Red Steel with 70 runs.

He was the leading run-scorer in the 2016–17 Regional Four Day Competition, with 691 runs in ten matches including centuries alongside a career best knock of 196. In October 2019, he was named as the captain of the West Indies Emerging Team for the 2019–20 Regional Super50 tournament. As a senior statesman, he led West Indies Emerging Team to win their first ever Super50 Cup with his all-round display in the final taking 3/8 and scoring a 54 ball 32 runs during the final of the 2019-20 Super50 Cup against Leeward Islands. He claimed player of the final award with West Indies Emerging Team cruised to a mammoth 205 run win the final after bowling out Leeward Islands to just 88.

In May 2022, he claimed a hat-trick for Queen's Park Cricket Club and played an instrumental role in helping Queen's Park Cricket Club to win the Trinidad and Tobago Cricket Board T20 Championship. In June 2022, he captained the West Indies President's XI in an unofficial tour match against Bangladesh. He scored five centuries in 71 first-class matches which made him to be a top contender for national selection despite making sporadic appearances in white ball cricket. He had played 27 List A games but none of them came during the timeframe between April 2013 and October 2018.

Prior to his surprise call-up to the three match ODI series in New Zealand in August 2022, Cariah played in the two first-class matches playing for West Indies A against touring Bangladesh A side.

== International career ==
Despite his creditable noteworthy performances at domestic level, his performances had largely gone unnoticed as he was never called up to international cricket up until August 2022. In August 2022, he was named in West Indies' ODI squad, for their series against New Zealand. He turned out to be a late bloomer at international level by receiving his maiden international call-up to the senior side at the age of 30 when he received his maiden international call-up during the bilateral ODI series against New Zealand in place of Gudakesh Motie who was nursing a finger fracture.

He made his ODI debut on 17 August 2022, for the West Indies against New Zealand. On his ODI debut, he returned with figures of 1/49 from his nine overs including picking up crucial wicket of Michael Bracewell as West Indies registered a comfortable win by five wickets chasing 191. Before his ODI debut, he did not appear in a single List A 50 over match since December 2019.

Only in his second ODI appearance, he showcased his batting credentials by reaching his maiden ODI half-century which was effectively his maiden international innings which came during the second match of the three match ODI series between New Zealand and the West Indies. He came on to bat at a time when the West Indies were at a precarious position reeling at 27/6 in a run chase of 213 and he was held at batting order no 8. He and Alzarri Joseph stitched a crucial partnership worth 85 runs which provided a glimmer of hope for the West Indies but the crucial dismissals of both Joseph and Carriah in quick succession within the next two overs eventually marked a 51 run defeat for the team in a rain-affected match as West Indies were bowled out for just 161 runs. Cariah was the last batsman to depart after making 52 off 84 deliveries including two boundaries and a six. The 85 runstand between Carriah and Joseph also set a new West Indies record for registering their highest eighth wicket partnership in ODI cricket surpassing the previous record of 77 held by Ian Bradshaw and Ramnaresh Sarwan which was also achieved against New Zealand way back in 2006. He ended the three match series bagging three wickets and with a half-century but was noticed for his impeccable control with the ball which caught the eyes of the selectors.

In September 2022, he was named in the West Indies' T20I squad for the 2022 ICC Men's T20 World Cup and the series against Australia on the back of his impressive outing against New Zealand. The surprise selection of Cariah as a wildcard entrant to the West Indies squad for the 2022 edition of the ICC Men's T20 World Cup raised few eyebrows as he did not feature in any Caribbean Premier League matches since the 2016 edition. His selection was considered as one of the most left-field selections in T20 World Cup history as he only featured in roughly four T20 games prior to his call-up to West Indies side for the T20 World Cup showpiece in Australia and having not even played a single T20 match since 2016. His talent was spotted by former West Indies opener and national chief selector Desmond Haynes who was in the forefront of backing Cariah to be part of the West Indies T20 World Cup squad as West Indies selectors continued to exclude Sunil Narine from selection and the ominous form of Hayden Walsh Jr. too playing a part in bringing Cariah back into the mix.

He made his T20I debut on 3 October 2022, against Australia. His T20I debut against Australia also eventually marked his return to the T20 format after a long hiatus of six years but he impressed on his T20I debut by picking up the priced scalp of Glenn Maxwell in his opening over and ended up with economical figures of 1/15 from the four overs including thirteen dot balls. Despite his economical bowling efforts, West Indies lost the first T20I match which turned out to be a nail-biter with Australia cruising to victory with only a ball to spare in a low scoring run chase of 146.
