= Shahnawaz Dahani =

Pakistani cricketer (born 1998)

Personal information
- Born: 5 August 1998 (age 28); Larkana, Sindh, Pakistan
- Height: 6 ft 2 in (188 cm)
- Batting: Right-handed
- Bowling: Right-arm fast-medium
- Role: Bowler

International information
- National side: Pakistan (2021–2022)
- ODI debut (cap 235): 12 June 2022 v West Indies
- Last ODI: 21 August 2022 v Netherlands
- ODI shirt no.: 28
- T20I debut (cap 95): 22 November 2021 v Bangladesh
- Last T20I: 11 October 2022 v New Zealand
- T20I shirt no.: 28

Domestic team information
- Years: Team
- 2019–2023: Sindh (squad no. 58)
- 2021–2024: Multan Sultans (squad no. 11)
- 2022: Jaffna Kings
- 2023: Chattogram Challengers (squad no. 28)
- 2023–present: Karachi Whites
- 2023: Dambulla Sixers
- 2025-present: Dhaka Capitals
- 2025: Karachi Kings
- 2026: Peshawar Zalmi (squad no. 27)

Career statistics
Competition	ODI	T20I	FC	LA
Matches	2	11	21	47
Runs scored	4	16	32	66
Batting average	–	16.00	2.28	6.00
100s/50s	0/0	0/0	0/0	0/0
Top score	4*	16	10	11
Balls bowled	96	212	3,330	2079
Wickets	1	8	70	82
Bowling average	73.00	40.00	29.30	24.48
5 wickets in innings	0	0	3	5
10 wickets in match	0	0	0	0
Best bowling	1/36	2/37	9/94	6/19
Catches/stumpings	0/–	1/–	11/–	8/–
- Source: Cricinfo, 28 October 2024

Shahnawaz Dahani (Sindhi: شاھنواز ڏاھاڻي, Urdu: شاہنواز دہانی; born 5 August 1998) is a Pakistani cricketer who made his international debut for the Pakistan national cricket team in November 2021. He made his Twenty20 debut on 23 February 2021 in the 2021, for Multan Sultans. Dahani is a right-arm fast-medium bowler, who bats right-handed in the last-order.

== Early life ==
Dahani was born in a village near Larkana, Sindh, Pakistan, Dahani's late father was against his desire to become a cricketer, preferring for him the career of a government official, and this is the reason why he completed his education, earning a BCom degree, before starting his professional cricket career.

== Domestic and T20 franchise career ==
He made his first-class debut on 25 November 2019, for Sindh cricket team, in the 2019–20 Quaid-e-Azam Trophy Trophy. He made his Twenty20 debut on 23 February 2021, for Multan Sultans in the 2021 Pakistan Super League. Shahnawaz Dahani of Multan Sultans took 20 wickets at an average of 17.00 to be the leading wicket-taker ahead of Wahab Riaz of Peshawar Zalmi with 18 wickets and win the Fazal Mahmood award. In July 2022, he was signed by the Jaffna Kings for the third edition of the Lanka Premier League.

== International career ==
In March 2021, Dahani was named in the Pakistan Test squad for their series against Zimbabwe. In June 2021, he was named in Pakistan's Test squad for their series against the West Indies. In September 2021, he was named in the One Day International (ODI) squad for Pakistan's series against New Zealand. Later the same month, he was named as one of three travelling reserve players in Pakistan's squad for the 2021 ICC Men's T20 World Cup. In November 2021, he was named in the Twenty20 International (T20I) squad for Pakistan's series against Bangladesh. He made his T20I debut on 22 November 2021, against the Bangladesh national cricket team.

In December 2021, he was again named in Pakistan's ODI squad, this time for their series against the West Indies. In March 2022, he was named in Pakistan's ODI squad for their series against Australia, and in May 2022, he was named in the ODI squad for the series against the West Indies. He made his ODI debut on 12 June 2022, for Pakistan against the West Indies.
