= Shamarh Brooks =

West Indian cricketer

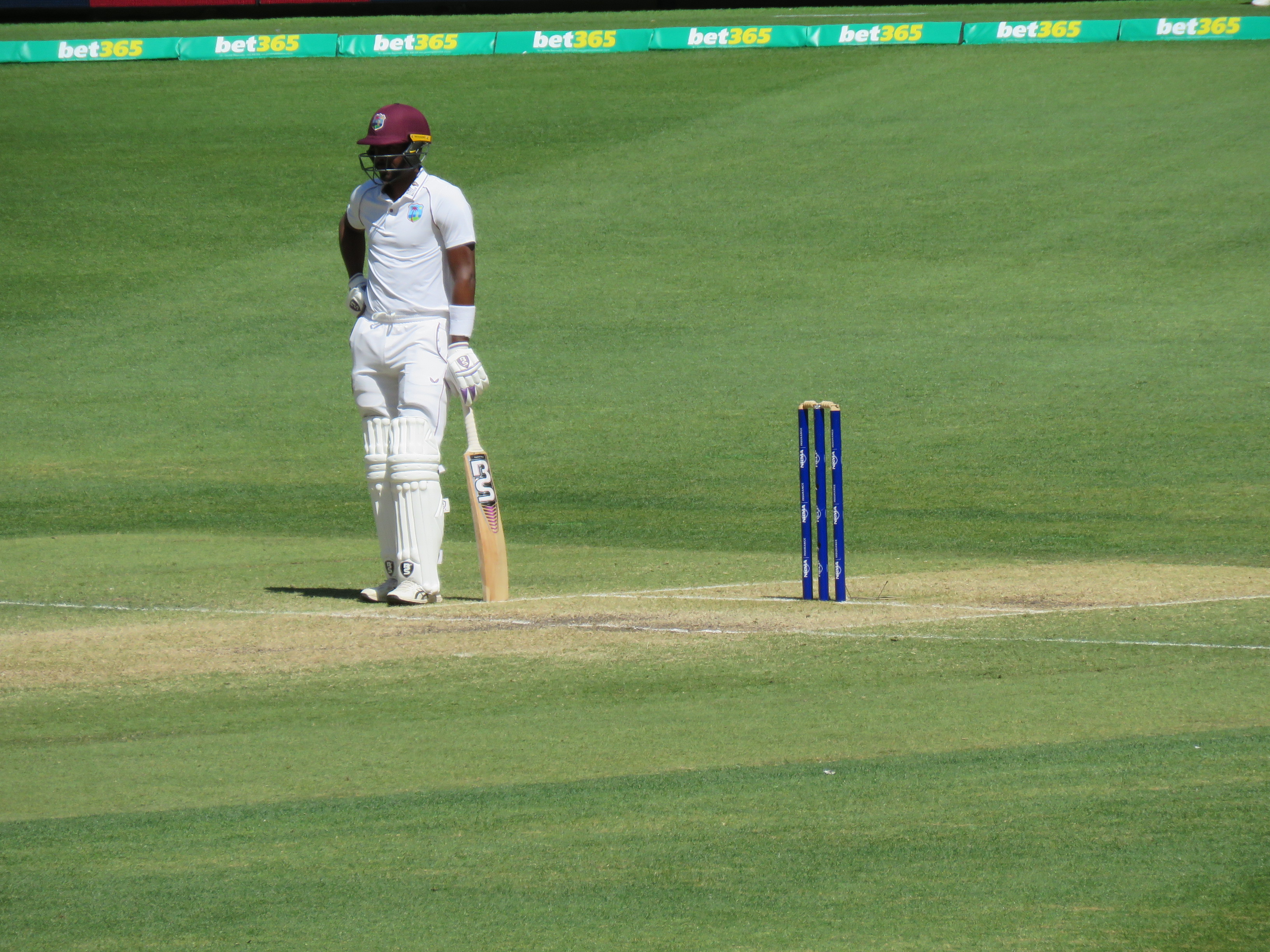
- Brooks batting during the first Test against Australia at Perth in December 2022

Personal information
- Full name: Shamarh Shaqad Joshua Brooks
- Born: 1 October 1988 (age 38); Saint Michael, Barbados
- Batting: Right-handed
- Bowling: Leg-break
- Role: Top-order batter

International information
- National side: West Indies (2019–present)
- Test debut (cap 318): 22 August 2019 v India
- Last Test: 8 December 2022 v Australia
- ODI debut (cap 207): 8 January 2022 v Ireland
- Last ODI: 9 June 2023 v UAE
- T20I debut (cap 88): 13 December 2021 v Pakistan
- Last T20I: 19 October 2022 v Zimbabwe

Domestic team information
- Years: Team
- 2007–present: Barbados
- 2016–2017: St Kitts & Nevis Patriots

Career statistics
Competition	Test	ODI	FC	LA
Matches	13	29	99	77
Runs scored	553	842	4,659	2014
Batting average	23.04	30.07	29.86	29.61
100s/50s	1/3	1/4	7/27	1/12
Top score	111	101*	166	101*
Balls bowled	–	–	791	60
Wickets	–	–	7	4
Bowling average	–	–	78.14	10.50
5 wickets in innings	–	–	0	0
10 wickets in match	–	–	0	0
Best bowling	–	–	2/68	2/12
Catches/stumpings	12/0	14/0	91/0	38/0
- Source: Cricinfo, 7 January 2024

Shamarh Shaqad Joshua Brooks (born 1 October 1988) is a Barbadian international cricketer who plays international cricket for West Indies, and plays domestic cricket for Barbados. He is a right-handed batsman who occasionally bowls leg-spin and mainly plays as a batsman. He made his international debut for the West Indies in August 2019.

== Early and domestic career ==
Brooks was seen as a cricket prodigy in his teenage years. He played for the West Indies under-19 cricket team in the 2006 Under-19 Cricket World Cup, made his first-class cricket debut for Barbados in 2007 and captained the West Indies in the 2008 Under-19 Cricket World Cup. He remained in the Barbados national team for several years, but never realized his full potential and after a particularly bad year in 2012, scoring just 76 runs at an average of 8.44, he was dropped from the national team.

Brooks didn't play another first-class match until 2015, but immediately upon his return he scored his maiden first-class century against the Windward Islands. Over the next five years, he scored 3091 runs at an average of 38.63, including five centuries and 20 half-centuries.

Brooks began to make steps towards Test cricket by captaining unofficial Test matches for the West Indies' second team, West Indies A, from 2016. This culminated in the West Indies A series against India A in England in 2018, where he scored 91 in the first match and 121 not out in the second match to finish as the highest run-scorer for the series.

=== Twenty20 franchise cricket ===
Brooks played for the St Kitts & Nevis Patriots in the Caribbean Premier League, the top-level Twenty20 league in the West Indies, for two seasons in 2016 and 2017. He played 4 matches in each season, and across them both scored 119 runs at an average of 23.80 with a strike-rate of 120.20.

== International career ==
In January 2019, Brooks was named in the West Indies' Test squad for their series against England as a reward for his first-class form, but he did not play. He then captained West Indies A in another series against India A in July and August 2019. Initially he was only meant to captain the final of three unofficial Test matches, with Kraigg Brathwaite captaining the first two, but after an injury to Brathwaite, he stepped in to captain the first two matches as well. Brooks led from the front with half centuries in both of the first two matches, He was then again named in the West Indies' Test squad, this time for their series against India.

Brooks made his Test debut for the West Indies against India on 22 August 2019. In November 2019, in the one-off Test against Afghanistan, Brooks scored his first century in Test cricket, with 111 runs.

In June 2020, Brooks was named in the West Indies' Test squad, for their series against England. The Test series was originally scheduled to start in May 2020, but was moved back to July 2020 due to the COVID-19 pandemic.

In November 2021, Brooks was named in the West Indies' One Day International (ODI) squad for their series against Pakistan. He made his Twenty20 International (T20I) debut on 13 December 2021, for the West Indies against Pakistan. In December 2021, he was named in the West Indies' ODI squad for their series against Ireland. He made his ODI debut on 8 January 2022, for the West Indies against Ireland.

On 4 June 2022, in the third and final match of the series against the Netherlands, Brooks scored his first century in ODI cricket, with 101 not out.

In December 2022, Brooks replaced Nkrumah Bonner as a concussion substitute on day 3 of the first Test of West Indies tour of Australia.
