= Over rate =

Cricket statistic

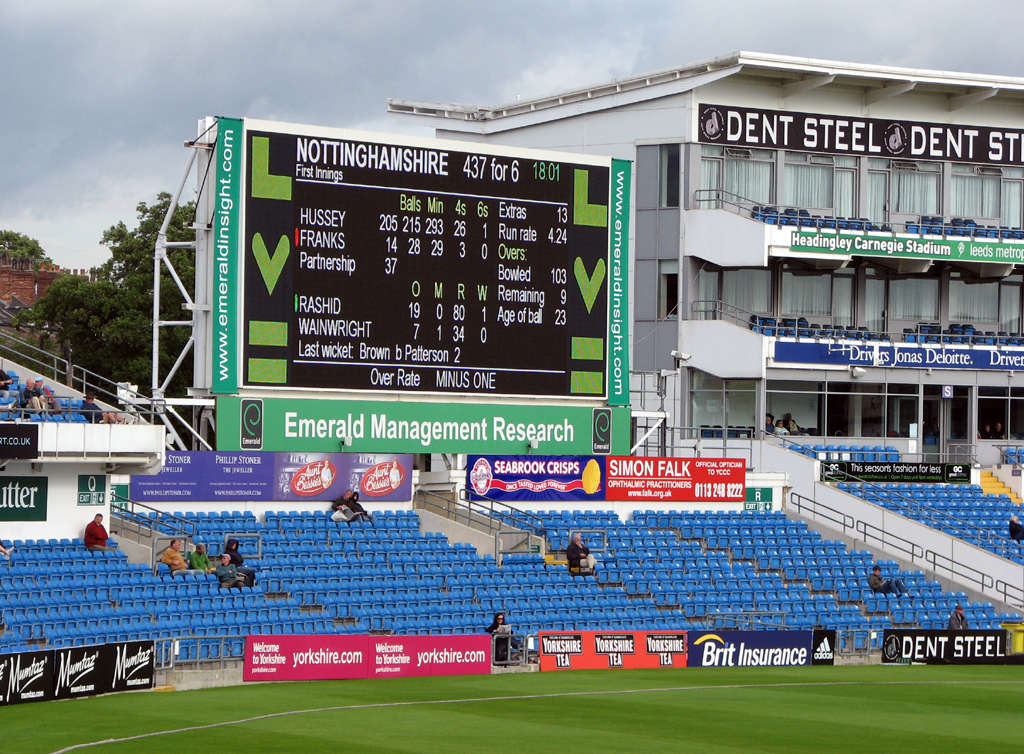
Scoreboard showing the bowling team's over rate achieved compared to the required minimum ('MINUS ONE').

An over rate is the average number of overs bowled per hour by the bowling team in cricket. When calculated by Test match officials, allowances are made for wickets taken (2 minutes per wicket), drinks breaks (4 minutes each), DRS reviews, treatment for injuries, and other reasons, which means the figure is higher than if calculated simply as the number of overs bowled divided by the number of hours of play.

In the highest levels of cricket, bowling sides are expected to achieve a minimum over rate. Bowling teams that have failed to achieve the minimum over rate have had points deducted, the players fined, or the captain suspended for future matches. In international cricket and some leagues, the over rate penalty is that the fielding team is restricted to having fewer fielders in the outfield, making it easier for the batting team to hit boundaries. It has been suggested that penalty runs could be imposed.

== Minimum levels ==
In Test cricket, bowling sides are expected to bowl a minimum of 15 overs per hour.

In ODIs, bowling sides are expected to bowl the 50 overs in 3.5 hours, equivalent to a minimum over rate of 14.28 overs per hour.

In T20Is, bowling sides are expected to bowl the 20 overs in 1 hour 25 minutes, equivalent to a minimum over rate of 14.11 overs per hour.

In The Hundred, innings of 100 balls are scheduled to take no more than 65 minutes, with fielding restrictions in place as a penalty for exceeding this time; this translates to 39 seconds per ball, or 15.38 "traditional" six-ball overs per hour. Unlike other formats of cricket, overs consist of 5 balls each, and 50 seconds are allowed to change ends between overs.

== Notable over rate penalties ==
In the 2017 County Championship, Middlesex were relegated by 1 point after a deduction of 2 points for a slow over rate. The minimum over rate requirement was 16 overs per hour.

In the World Cup 1999, India were fined four overs due to a slow over rate. However, Zimbabwe clinched the victory by 3 runs as India were bowled out in 45 overs.

In the 2019–21 ICC World Test Championship, Australia were deducted 4 points for a slow over rate in the second Test against India on 29 December 2020. This ended up resulting in Australia not qualifying for the final, as it reduced their final percentage of points won from 70% (336/480) to 69.2% (332/480). This put them below New Zealand, who achieved 70%. Australia would have finished above New Zealand, in 2nd place, and thus qualified for the final, if the two countries had tied on 70%, due to Australia's superior Runs Per Wicket Ratio.

== See also ==
- Over (cricket)
- Stop clock (cricket)
- Pitch clock (baseball)
