= List of flag bearers for Antigua and Barbuda at the Olympics =

Antigua and Barbuda at the Olympics
- IOC code: ANT
- NOC: The Antigua and Barbuda Olympic Association
- Website: antiguaolympiccommittee.com
- Medals: Gold 0 Silver 0 Bronze 0 Total 0

Summer appearances
- 1976; 1980; 1984; 1988; 1992; 1996; 2000; 2004; 2008; 2012; 2016; 2020; 2024

This is a list of flag bearers who have represented Antigua and Barbuda at the Olympics.

Flag bearers carry the national flag of their country at the opening ceremony of the Olympic Games.

#	Event year	Season	Flag bearer	Sport
1	1976	Summer	Fred Sowerby	Athletics
2	1984	Summer	Lester Benjamin	Athletics
3	1988	Summer	Jocelyn Joseph	Athletics
4	1992	Summer		
5	1996	Summer	Heather Samuel	Athletics
6	2000	Summer	Heather Samuel	Athletics
7	2004	Summer	Daniel Bailey	Athletics
8	2008	Summer	James Grayman	Athletics
9	2012	Summer	Daniel Bailey	Athletics
10	2016	Summer	Daniel Bailey	Athletics
11	2020	Summer	Cejhae Greene	Athletics
11	2020	Summer	Samantha Roberts	Swimming
12	2024	Summer	Cejhae Greene	Athletics
12	2024	Summer	Joella Lloyd	Athletics

== See also ==
- Antigua and Barbuda at the Olympics
