= Antigua and Barbuda at the 1996 Summer Olympics =

- IOC code: ANT
- NOC: Antigua and Barbuda National Olympic Committee

in Atlanta
- Competitors: 13 (8 men and 5 women) in 4 sports
- Flag bearer: Heather Samuel
- Medals: Gold 0 Silver 0 Bronze 0 Total 0

Summer Olympics appearances (overview)
- 1976; 1980; 1984; 1988; 1992; 1996; 2000; 2004; 2008; 2012; 2016; 2020; 2024; 2028

Antigua and Barbuda was represented at the 1996 Summer Olympics in Atlanta, Georgia, United States by the Antigua and Barbuda National Olympic Committee.

In total, 13 athletes including eight men and five woman represented Antigua and Barbuda in four different sports including athletics, canoeing, cycling and sailing.

== Competitors ==
In total, 13 athletes represented Antigua and Barbuda at the 1996 Summer Olympics in Atlanta, Georgia, United States across four different sports.

Sport	Men	Women	Total
Athletics	4	4	8
Canoeing	2	1	3
Cycling	1	0	1
Sailing	1	0	1
Total	8	5	13

== Athletics ==
In total, eight Antiguan and Barbudan athletes participated in the athletics events – N'kosie Barnes, Mitchell Browne, Howard Lindsay, Dine Potter, Heather Samuel, Michael Terry, Charmaine Thomas, Sonia Williams.

The heats for the women's 100 m took place on 26 July 1996. Samuel finished fifth in her heat in a time of 11.44 seconds as she advanced to the quarter-finals. She then finished seventh in her quarter-final heat, held later the same day, in a time of 11.6 seconds. She did not advance to the semi-finals.

The heats for the women's 200 m took place on 31 July 1996. Samuel finished fourth in her heat in a time of 23.24 seconds as she advanced to the quarter-finals. She then finished eighth in her quarter-final heat, held later the same day, in a time of 23.54 seconds. She did not advance to the semi-finals.

The heats for the men's 4 x 400 m took place on 2 August 1996. Antigua and Barbuda – consisting of Barnes, Terry, Brown and Lindsay – finished sixth in their heat in a time of three minutes 9.46 seconds. They did not advance to the final.

The heats for the women's 4 x 100 m also took place on 2 August 1996. Antigua and Barbuda – consisting of Williams, Potter, Thomas and Samuel – did not finish.

The heats for the women's 4 x 400 m also took place on 2 August 1996. Antigua and Barbuda – consisting of Potter, Williams, Thomas and Samual – finished sixth in their heat in a time of three minutes 44.98 seconds. They did not advance to the final.

Athlete	Event	Heat		Quarterfinal		Semifinal		Final	
Athlete	Event	Result	Rank	Result	Rank	Result	Rank	Result	Rank
Heather Samuel	women's 100 m	11.44	5 Q	11.60	7	did not advance			
Heather Samuel	women's 200 m	23.34	4 Q	23.54	8	did not advance			
Dine Potter; Sonia Williams; Charmaine Thomas; Heather Samuel	women's 4 × 100 m relay	DNF		did not advance					
N'kosie Barnes; Michael Terry; Mitchell Browne; Howard Lindsay	men's 4 × 400 m relay	3:09.46	6	did not advance					
Dine Potter; Sonia Williams; Charmaine Thomas; Heather Samuel	women's 4 × 400 m relay	3:44.98	6	did not advance					

== Canoeing ==
In total, three Antiguan and Barbudan athletes participated in the canoeing events – Heidi Lehrer in the women's K-1 500 m and Pieter Lehrer and Jacob Lehrer in the men's C-2 1,000 m.

The first round of the men's C-2 1,000 m took place on 30 July 1996. Peter Lehrer and Jacob Lehrer finished ninth in their heat in a time of five minutes 20.421 seconds. They did not advance to the semi-finals.

The first round of the women's K-1 500 m took place on 31 July 1996. Heidi Lehrer finished eighth in her heat in a time of three minutes 0.672 seconds. She did not advance to the semi-finals.

Athlete	Event	Heats		Repechage		Semifinals		Final	
Athlete	Event	Time	Rank	Time	Rank	Time	Rank	Time	Rank
Heidi Lehrer	women's K-1 500 m	3:00.672	8	did not advance					23
Pieter Lehrer; Jacob Lehrer	men's C-2 1,000 m	5:20.421	9	did not advance					17

== Cycling ==
In total, one Antiguan and Barbudan athlete participated in the cycling events – Rory Gonsalves in the mountain bike men's cross-country.

The men's cross-country took place on 30 July 1996. Gonsalves did not finish.

Athlete	Event		
Athlete	Event	Time	Rank
Rory Gonsalves	Cross-country	DNF	

== Sailing ==
In total, one Antiguan and Barbudan athlete participated in the sailing events – Karl James in the laser.

The 11 races in the laser competition took place from 23–31 July 1996. James achieved his best result in race 11 finishing 28th. Overall, he finished with a net 340 points and placed 43rd.

Open

Athlete	Event	Race											Score	Rank
Athlete	Event	1	2	3	4	5	6	7	8	9	10	11	Score	Rank
Karl James	Laser	45	35	39	35	39	~~DNF~~	34	45	49	40	28	340.0	43
