= Antigua and Barbuda at the Olympics =

- IOC code: ANT
- NOC: Antigua and Barbuda National Olympic Committee
- Website: antiguabarbudanoc.com
- Medals: Gold 0 Silver 0 Bronze 0 Total 0

Summer appearances
- 1976; 1980; 1984; 1988; 1992; 1996; 2000; 2004; 2008; 2012; 2016; 2020; 2024

Antigua and Barbuda first competed at the Olympic Games in 1976, and has participated in each subsequent Summer Olympic Games with the exception of the 1980 Moscow Olympics (Games of the XXII Olympiad); Antigua and Barbuda participated in the American-led boycott.

The nation has never won a medal at the Summer Olympics, and has never competed in the Winter Olympic Games.

The Antigua and Barbuda Olympic Association was formed in 1966 after the dissolution of the West Indies Federation in 1962, and recognized in 1976.

== Medal tables ==
=== Medals by Summer Games ===
Games	Athletes	Gold	Silver	Bronze	Total	Rank
1976 Montreal	10	0	0	0	0	–
1980 Moscow	boycotted					
1984 Los Angeles	14	0	0	0	0	–
1988 Seoul	15	0	0	0	0	–
1992 Barcelona	13	0	0	0	0	–
1996 Atlanta	13	0	0	0	0	–
2000 Sydney	3	0	0	0	0	–
2004 Athens	5	0	0	0	0	–
2008 Beijing	5	0	0	0	0	–
2012 London	4	0	0	0	0	–
2016 Rio de Janeiro	9	0	0	0	0	–
2020 Tokyo	6	0	0	0	0	–
2024 Paris	5	0	0	0	0	–
2028 Los Angeles	future event					
2032 Brisbane	future event					
Total		0	0	0	0	–

== Flagbearers ==
Games	Athlete	Sport
1984 Los Angeles	Lester Benjamin	Athletics
1988 Seoul	Jocelyn Joseph	Athletics
1992 Barcelona		
1996 Atlanta	Heather Samuel	Athletics
2000 Sydney	Heather Samuel	Athletics
2004 Athens	Daniel Bailey	Athletics
2008 Beijing	James Grayman	Athletics
2012 London	Daniel Bailey	Athletics
2016 Rio de Janeiro	Daniel Bailey	Athletics
2020 Tokyo	Samantha Roberts & Cejhae Greene	Swimming (Roberts) & Athletics (Greene)
2024 Paris	Joella Lloyd & Cejhae Greene	Athletics

== See also ==
- Antigua and Barbuda at the Paralympics
- Antigua and Barbuda at the Commonwealth Games
