= Antigua and Barbuda at the 2012 Summer Olympics =

- IOC code: ANT
- NOC: Antigua and Barbuda National Olympic Committee

in London
- Competitors: 4 in 2 sports
- Flag bearers: Daniel Bailey (opening); Karin O'Reilly Clashing (closing)
- Medals: Gold 0 Silver 0 Bronze 0 Total 0

Summer Olympics appearances (overview)
- 1976; 1980; 1984; 1988; 1992; 1996; 2000; 2004; 2008; 2012; 2016; 2020; 2024; 2028

Antigua and Barbuda competed at the 2012 Summer Olympics in London, United Kingdom from 27 July to 12 August 2012. It was the nation's ninth appearance at the Summer Olympics, since its debut at the 1976 Summer Olympics in Montreal. The Antigua and Barbuda delegation consisted of four athletes competing in two sports. The country did not win any medals at the Games.

== Background ==
The Antigua and Barbuda National Olympic Committee was founded in 1965 and was recognized by the International Olympic Committee (IOC) in 1976. The nation made its first Olympic appearance at the 1976 Summer Olympics in Montreal. Since then, it has competed in every Olympics except the 1980 Summer Olympics in Moscow. The 2012 Summer Olympics was the nation's ninth appearance at the Summer Olympics.

The 2012 Summer Olympics was held in London, United Kingdom, between 27 July to 12 August 2012. Sprinter Daniel Bailey carried the flag for the third time at the opening ceremony. Swimmer Karin O'Reilly Clashing was the flag bearer during the closing ceremony. Antigua and Barbuda did not win a medal at the Games.

== Competitors ==
The team from Antigua and Barbuda consisted of four athletes competing in two sports.

Sport	Men	Women	Total
Athletics	2	1	3
Swimming	0	1	1
Total	2	2	4

== Athletics ==
As per IAAF, a National Olympic Committee (NOC) was allowed to enter up to three qualified athletes in each individual event if the Olympic Qualifying Standard time was met during the qualifying period from 1 May 2011 to 8 July 2012. The remaining quotas were allocated by the Tripartite Commission as universality invitations. Antigua and Barbuda entered three athletes in the athletics events–Daniel Bailey in the men's 100 metres, Brendan Christian in the men's 200 metres, and Afia Charles in the women's 400 metres.

Bailey took up running at the age of 11, and began training from the age of 16. He made his Olympics debut at the 2008 Summer Olympics, and set a best time of 10.23 seconds in the seminfinals. He set a personal best time of 9.99 seconds at the South American Grande Prêmio Brasil Caixa meet, becoming the first athlete to run under ten seconds on the continent. He set a new national record of 9.91 seconds later. He won silver medals at the 2010 Central American and Caribbean Games and the 2010 IAAF Continental Cup.

Brendon Christian is the son of Donald Christian, who represented Antigua and Barbuda in the 1976 Summer Olympics. He won a gold and bronze in the 200 metres and 100 metres events respectively at the 2007 Pan American Games. He is competing in his third consecutive Olympic Games since his debut at the 2004 Summer Olympics. Afia Charles is the daughter of Ruperta Charles, who represented the nation in the 1984 Summer Olympics. She was born in Maryland, and this was her debut appearance at the Summer Olympics.

The athletics events were held at the Olympic Stadium in the Olympic Park in Stratford, London. In the men's 100 metres, held on 4 and 5 August 2012, Bailey finished second in the preliminary round with a time of 10.12 seconds, qualifying for the next round. In the semifinal, he finished sixth in his heat with a time of 10.16 seconds and did not advance to the final. In the men's 200 metres, Christian made it through the semifinals after setting a time of 20.63 seconds in the preliminary round. In the semifinal, he finished fifth in his heat with a time of 20.58 seconds and did not advance to the final. In the women's 400 metres, Charles finished fifth in the preliminary heat with a time of 54.25 seconds and did not advance further.

Athlete	Event	Heat		Quarterfinal		Semifinal		Final	
Athlete	Event	Result	Rank	Result	Rank	Result	Rank	Result	Rank
Daniel Bailey	Men's 100 m	Bye		10.12	2 Q	10.16	6	Did not advance	
Brendan Christian	Men's 200 m	20.63	4 q	—N/a		20.58	5	Did not advance	
Afia Charles	400 m	54.25	5	—N/a		Did not advance			

Key

- Note–Ranks given for track events are within the athlete's heat only
- Q = Qualified for the next round
- q = Qualified for the next round as a fastest loser or, in field events, by position without achieving the qualifying target
- NR = National record
- N/A = Round not applicable for the event
- Bye = Athlete not required to compete in round

== Swimming ==
As per FINA, a NOC was permitted to enter a maximum of two qualified athletes in each individual event who achieved the Olympic Qualifying Time (OQT) or Olympic Selection Time (OST) during the qualifying period from 1 March 2011 to 25 June 2012. NOCs were otherwise granted entry to enroll two swimmers (one per gender) under universality places. Suriname entered a single swimmer for the Games.

Twenty year old Karin O'Reilly Clashing entered her first Olympic Games. She is the sister of Christal O'Reilly Clashing, who had participated in the 2004 Summer Olympics.

The swimming events were held at the London Aquatics Centre in the Olympic Park, Stratford, London. In the women's 50 metre freestyle heat on 3 August 2012, Karin finished 55th overall with a time of 30.01 seconds and did not advance to the semi-finals.

Athlete	Events	Heat		Semifinal		Final	
Athlete	Events	Time	Rank	Time	Rank	Time	Rank
Karin O'Reilly Clashing	Women's 50 m freestyle	30.01	55	Did not advance			

== See also ==
- Antigua and Barbuda at the 2012 Summer Paralympics
- Antigua and Barbuda at the 2011 Pan American Games
