= Antigua and Barbuda at the 2004 Summer Olympics =

- IOC code: ANT
- NOC: Antigua and Barbuda National Olympic Committee

in Athens
- Competitors: 5 in 2 sports
- Flag bearer: Daniel Bailey
- Medals: Gold 0 Silver 0 Bronze 0 Total 0

Summer Olympics appearances (overview)
- 1976; 1980; 1984; 1988; 1992; 1996; 2000; 2004; 2008; 2012; 2016; 2020; 2024; 2028

Antigua and Barbuda competed at the 2004 Summer Olympics in Athens, Greece from 13 to 29 August 2004. It was the nation's seventh appearance at the Summer Olympics, since its debut at the 1976 Summer Olympics in Montreal. The Antigua and Barbuda delegation consisted of five athletes competing in two sports. The country did not win any medals at the Games.

== Background ==
The Antigua and Barbuda National Olympic Committee was founded in 1965 and was recognized by the International Olympic Committee (IOC) in 1976. The nation made its first Olympic appearance at the 1976 Summer Olympics in Montreal. Since then, it has competed in every Olympics except the 1980 Summer Olympics in Moscow. The 2004 Summer Olympics was the nation's seventh appearance at the Summer Olympics.

The 2004 Summer Olympics was held in Athens, Greece from 13 to 29 August 2004. Sprinter Daniel Bailey carried the flag at the opening ceremony. Antigua and Barbuda did not win a medal at the Games.

== Competitors ==
The team from Antigua and Barbuda consisted of five athletes competing in two sports.

Sport	Men	Women	Total
Athletics	2	1	3
Swimming	1	1	2
Total	3	2	5

== Athletics ==
As per IAAF, a National Olympic Committee (NOC) was allowed to enter up to four qualified athletes in each individual event (maximum of three athletes in each event at the 'A' Standard, and one athlete at the 'B' Standard) if the Olympic Qualifying Standard time was met during the qualifying period. Three athletes from Antigua and Barbuda achieved qualifying standards in the athletics events. Daniel Bailey competed in the men's 100 metres, Brendan Christian in the men's 200 metres, and Heather Samuel in the women's 100 metres.

Samuel is an Olympic veteran and was competing in her fourth Summer Olympics after her debut at the 1992 Summer Olympics. She won a bronze in the 1995 Pan American Games and a silver and bronze medal each in the 1990 and 2002 Central American and Caribbean Games. Bailey, who began running at the age of 11, and began professional training from the age of 16. This was his debut at the Summer Olympics. Brendon Christian is the son of Donald Christian, who represented Antigua and Barbuda in the 1976 Summer Olympics. He made his debut at the 2004 Summer Olympics.

The athletics events were held at the Olympiako Stadio in Athens. In the men's 100 metres, Bailey finished sixth in his heat and did not advance to the quarterfinal. In the men's 200 metres, Christian qualified for the quarterfinals with a time of 20.71 seconds. In the quarterfinals, he finished seventh with a time of 20.63 seconds, and did not advance to the semifinal. In the women's 100 metres, Samuel finished sixth and did not make it out of the qualifying heat.

Athlete	Event	Heat		Quarterfinal		Semifinal		Final	
Athlete	Event	Result	Rank	Result	Rank	Result	Rank	Result	Rank
Daniel Bailey	Men's 100 m	10.51	6	Did not advance					
Brendan Christian	Men's 200 m	20.71	5 q	20.63	7	Did not advance			
Heather Samuel	Women's 100 m	12.05	6	Did not advance					

Key

- Note–Ranks given for track events are within the athlete's heat only
- Q = Qualified for the next round
- q = Qualified for the next round as a fastest loser or, in field events, by position without achieving the qualifying target
- NR = National record
- N/A = Round not applicable for the event
- Bye = Athlete not required to compete in round

== Swimming ==
Antigua and Barbuda entered two swimmers for the Games. Malique Williams competed in the men's 50 m freestyle and Christal Clashing in the women's 50 m freestyle event. This was the first Olympic and only appearance for both Malique Williams, and Christal.

The swimming events were held at the Athens Olympic Aquatic Centre in Marousi, Athens. In the men's 50 metre freestyle heat, Williams finished 82nd with a time of 32.86 seconds and did not advance to the semi-finals. In the women's 50 metre freestyle heat on 20 August 2004, Clashing finished 67th overall with a time of 31.55 seconds and did not advance to the semi-finals.

Athlete	Event	Heat		Semifinal		Final	
Athlete	Event	Time	Rank	Time	Rank	Time	Rank
Malique Williams	Men's 50 m freestyle	32.86	82	Did not advance			
Christal Clashing	Women's 50 m freestyle	31.55	67	Did not advance			

== See also ==
- Antigua and Barbuda at the 2003 Pan American Games
