= Antigua and Barbuda at the 1988 Summer Olympics =

- IOC code: ANT
- NOC: Antigua and Barbuda National Olympic Committee

in Seoul
- Competitors: 15 (12 men and 3 women) in 4 sports
- Flag bearer: Jocelyn Joseph
- Medals: Gold 0 Silver 0 Bronze 0 Total 0

Summer Olympics appearances (overview)
- 1976; 1980; 1984; 1988; 1992; 1996; 2000; 2004; 2008; 2012; 2016; 2020; 2024; 2028

Antigua and Barbuda competed at the 1988 Summer Olympics in Seoul, South Korea. Fifteen competitors, twelve men and three women, took part in nineteen events in four sports.

== Competitors ==
The following is the list of number of competitors in the Games.

Sport	Men	Women	Total
Athletics	7	3	10
Boxing	2	–	2
Cycling	2	0	2
Sailing	1	0	1
Total	12	3	15

== Athletics ==
=== Men ===
==== Track & road events ====
Athlete	Event	Heat		Quarterfinal		Semifinal		Final	
Athlete	Event	Result	Rank	Result	Rank	Result	Rank	Result	Rank
St. Clair Soleyne	100 m	11.17	8	did not advance					
Alfred Browne	400 m	48.92	8	did not advance					
Oral Selkridge	400 m hurdles	53.44	7	did not advance					
Dale Jones	800 m	1:49.31	5	did not advance					
Dale Jones	1500 m	3:51.22	42	did not advance					
Howard Lindsay	200 m	22.60	65	did not advance					
St. Clair Soleyne; Alfred Browne; Howard Lindsay; Larry Miller	4 × 100 m relay	41.18	6	did not advance					
Howard Lindsay; Alfred Browne; Oral Selkridge; Larry Miller	4 × 400 m relay	3:11.04	6	did not advance					

==== Field events ====
Athlete	Event	Qualification		Final	
Athlete	Event	Distance	Position	Distance	Position
James Browne	Long jump	7.67	17	did not advance	

=== Women ===
==== Track & road events ====
Athlete	Event	Heat		Quarterfinal		Semifinal		Final	
Athlete	Event	Result	Rank	Result	Rank	Result	Rank	Result	Rank
Laverne Bryan	800 m	2:12.18	7	did not advance					
Laverne Bryan	1500 m	4:39.73	26	did not advance					
Jocelyn Joseph	200 m	23.57	4 Q	23.59	7	did not advance			
Barbara Selkridge	400 m	55.96	7	did not advance					

== Boxing ==
=== Men ===
Athlete	Event	1 Round	2 Round	3 Round	Quarterfinals	Semifinals	Final
Athlete	Event	Opposition Result	Opposition Result	Opposition Result	Opposition Result	Opposition Result	Rank
Lionel Francis	Bantamweight	Ndaba Dube (ZIM); L RSC-2	did not advance				
Daryl Joseph	Welterweight	BYE	Adewale Adgebusi (NIG); L TKO-1	did not advance			

== Cycling ==
Two male cyclists represented Antigua and Barbuda in 1988.

=== Track ===
==== 1000m time trial ====
Athlete	Event	Time	Rank
Nigel Neil Lloyd	Men's 1000m time trial	1:18.324	30

==== Men's Sprint ====
Athlete	Event	Qualification		Round 1	Repechage 1	Round 2	Repechage 2	Repechage Finals	Quarterfinals	Semifinals	Final
Athlete	Event	Time Speed (km/h)	Rank	Opposition Time Speed (km/h)	Opposition Time Speed (km/h)	Opposition Time Speed (km/h)	Opposition Time Speed (km/h)	Opposition Time Speed (km/h)	Opposition Time Speed (km/h)	Opposition Time Speed (km/h)	Rank
Ira Fabian	Men's sprint	12.817	25	did not advance							25

==== Omnium ====
Athlete	Event	Qualification		Final	
Athlete	Event	Score	Rank	Score	Rank
Nigel Neil Lloyd	Points race	DNF		did not advance	

== Sailing ==
=== Men ===
Athlete	Event	Race							Score	Rank
Athlete	Event	1	2	3	4	5	6	7	Score	Rank
Eli Fuller	Lechner Division II	~~YMP~~	30	36	36	RET	34	24	228.0	31

== See also ==
- Antigua and Barbuda at the 1987 Pan American Games
