= Antigua and Barbuda at the 1992 Summer Olympics =

- IOC code: ANT
- NOC: Antigua and Barbuda National Olympic Committee

in Barcelona
- Competitors: 13 (9 men and 4 women) in 3 sports
- Medals: Gold 0 Silver 0 Bronze 0 Total 0

Summer Olympics appearances (overview)
- 1976; 1980; 1984; 1988; 1992; 1996; 2000; 2004; 2008; 2012; 2016; 2020; 2024; 2028

Antigua and Barbuda competed at the 1992 Summer Olympics in Barcelona, Spain. Thirteen competitors, nine men and four women, took part in fifteen events in three sports.

== Competitors ==
The following is the list of number of competitors in the Games.

Sport	Men	Women	Total
Athletics	3	2	5
Cycling	3	0	3
Sailing	3	2	5
Total	9	4	13

== Athletics ==
Men
Track and road events

Athletes	Events	Heat Round 1		Heat Round 2		Semifinal		Final	
Athletes	Events	Time	Rank	Time	Rank	Time	Rank	Time	Rank
Kenmore Hughes	200 metres	22.18	67	Did not advance					
Kenmore Hughes	400 metres	48.56	56	Did not advance					
Dale Jones	800 metres	1:50.43	32	N/A		Did not advance			
Reuben Appleton	1500 metres	4:02.99	44	N/A		Did not advance			

=== Women ===
Track and road events

Athletes	Events	Heat Round 1		Heat Round 2		Semifinal		Final	
Athletes	Events	Time	Rank	Time	Rank	Time	Rank	Time	Rank
Heather Samuel	100 metres	11.76	34	Did not advance					
Heather Samuel	200 metres	24.09	31 Q	24.12	31	Did not advance			
Charmaine Gilgeous	400 metres	55.48	35	Did not advance					

== Cycling ==
Three male cyclists represented Antigua and Barbuda in 1992.

=== Road ===
Men

Athlete	Event	Time	Rank
Neil Lloyd	Road race	Did not finish	
Robert Marsh	Road race	Did not finish	
Robert Peters	Road race	Did not finish	

=== Track ===
Pursuits

Athlete	Event	Qualifying		1st round		Finals	
Athlete	Event	Time	Rank	Opposition Time	Rank	Opposition Time	Rank
Robert Peters	Men's individual pursuit	overtaken		Did not advance			

Time trials

Athlete	Event	Time	Rank
Neil Lloyd	Men's 1000 metre time trial	1:14.816	31

Points races

Athlete	Event	Qualifying		Finals	
Athlete	Event	Points	Rank	Points	Rank
Neil Lloyd	Men's points race	Did not finish		Did not advance	

== Sailing ==
Men

Athlete	Event	Race										Score	Rank
Athlete	Event	1	2	3	4	5	6	7	8	9	10	Score	Rank
Ty Brodie	Lechner A-390	40	41	39	~~DNC~~	40	40	DNC	43	43	DNC	430	43
Stedroy Braithwaite	Finn	~~28~~	25	23	24	27	28	24	—N/a			187	27

Women

Athlete	Event	Race							Score	Rank
Athlete	Event	1	2	3	4	5	6	7	Score	Rank
Karen Portch	Europe	19	~~24~~	18	23	22	20	22	160	23

Open

Athlete	Event	Race							Score	Rank
Athlete	Event	1	2	3	4	5	6	7	Score	Rank
Paola Vittoria; Carlo Falcone	Star	25	25	21	~~26~~	17	25	21	170	24

== See also ==
- Antigua and Barbuda at the 1991 Pan American Games
