= Antigua and Barbuda at the 2020 Summer Olympics =

- IOC code: ANT
- NOC: Antigua and Barbuda National Olympic Committee

in Tokyo, Japan July 23, 2021 – August 8, 2021
- Competitors: 6 in 4 sports
- Flag bearers (opening): Samantha Roberts; Cejhae Greene
- Flag bearer (closing): Cejhae Greene
- Medals: Gold 0 Silver 0 Bronze 0 Total 0

Summer Olympics appearances (overview)
- 1976; 1980; 1984; 1988; 1992; 1996; 2000; 2004; 2008; 2012; 2016; 2020; 2024

Antigua and Barbuda competed at the 2020 Summer Olympics in Tokyo. Originally scheduled to take place from 24 July to 9 August 2020, the Games were postponed to 23 July to 8 August 2021, because of the COVID-19 pandemic. It was the nation's eleventh appearance at the Summer Olympics, since its debut at the 1976 Summer Olympics in Montreal. The Antigua and Barbuda delegation consisted of six athletes competing in four sports. The country did not win any medals at the Games.

== Background ==
The Antigua and Barbuda National Olympic Committee was founded in 1965 and was recognized by the International Olympic Committee (IOC) in 1976. The nation made its first Olympic appearance at the 1976 Summer Olympics in Montreal. Since then, it has competed in every Olympics except the 1980 Summer Olympics in Moscow. The 2020 Summer Olympics was the nation's eleventh appearance at the Summer Olympics.

The 2020 Summer Olympics was held in Tokyo, Japan, between 23 July and 8 August 2021. Originally scheduled to take place from 24 July to 9 August 2020, the Games were postponed due to the COVID-19 pandemic. For the first time, the International Olympic Committee invited each National Olympic Committee to select one female and one male athlete to jointly carry their flag during the opening ceremony. Swimmer Samantha Roberts and sprinter Cejhae Greene were the country's flag bearers at the opening ceremony. Greene served as the flag bearer during the closing ceremony. Antigua and Barbuda did not win a medal at the Games.

== Competitors ==
The Antigua and Barbuda delegation consisted of six athletes.

Sport	Men	Women	Total
Athletics	1	1	2
Boxing	1	0	1
Sailing	0	1	1
Swimming	1	1	2
Total	3	3	6

== Athletics ==
As per the governing body World Athletics (WA), a NOC was allowed to enter up to three qualified athletes in each individual event if the Olympic Qualifying Standards (OQS) for the respective events had been met during the qualifying period. The remaining places were allocated based on the World Athletics Rankings which were derived from the average of the best five results for an athlete over the designated qualifying period, weighted by the importance of the meet. Virgin Islands received a universality slot from the WA to send a male track and field athlete to the Olympics.

The athletics events were held at the Japan National Stadium in Tokyo. In the men's 100 m, Cejhae Greene finished sixth in the quarterfinals with a time of 10.25 seconds, and did not qualify for the semifinals. In the women's 100 m, Joella Lloyd finished first in the qualifying heat with a time of 11.55 seconds. In the quarterfinals, she was ranked only seventh and did not qualify for the semifinals.

Key

- Note–Ranks given for track events are within the athlete's heat only
- Q = Qualified for the next round
- q = Qualified for the next round as a fastest loser or, in field events, by position without achieving the qualifying target
- NR = National record
- N/A = Round not applicable for the event
- Bye = Athlete not required to compete in round

Track & road events

Athlete	Event	Heat		Quarterfinal		Semifinal		Final	
Athlete	Event	Result	Rank	Result	Rank	Result	Rank	Result	Rank
Cejhae Greene	Men's 100 m	Bye		10:25	6	Did not advance			
Joella Lloyd	Women's 100 m	11:55	1 Q	11:54	7	Did not advance			

== Boxing ==
The qualification to the Olympic Games was determined by the performance of the boxers at the four continental Olympic qualifying tournaments (Africa, Americas, Asia & Oceania, and Europe) and at the World Olympic qualification tournament. The final list of qualifiers was announced on 15 July 2021. However, with the cancellation of the 2021 Pan American Qualification Tournament, Alston Ryan secured a place in the men's lightweight division based on the IOC's Boxing Rankings for the Americas. This was the second ever appearance for the nation in the Boxing event in the Summer Olympics after its debut in the sport in the 1988 Summer Olympics.

The boxing events took place from 24 July to 8 August 2021 at the Ryōgoku Kokugikan. In his debut match in the event, Ryan lost to Hovhannes Bachkov of Armenia in the Round of 32 and exited the competition. Ryan lost the bout by a unanimous decision after all five judges awarded the contest in favour of the Armenian.

Athlete	Event	Round of 32	Round of 16	Quarterfinals	Semifinals	Final	
Athlete	Event	Opposition Result	Opposition Result	Opposition Result	Opposition Result	Opposition Result	Rank
Alston Ryan	Men's lightweight	Bachkov (ARM); L 0–5	Did not advance				

== Sailing ==
The qualification period for the sailing event commenced at the 2018 Sailing World Championships in Aarhus, where the Olympic quota was awarded to the NOCs of the top finishers. Six quota places were allocated further at the 2018 Asian Games and 2019 Pan American Games, with 61 quotas across events distributed to the sailors at the World Championships in 2019. The final continental qualification regattas were held in 2021 to decide the remainder of the quota places. Jalese Gordon represented Antigua and Barbuda after an invitation from the Tripartite Commission to compete in the Laser Radial event, and marked the country's return to the sport in the Olympics after the 2000 Summer Olympics.

The sailing events were held off the coast of Enoshima from 25 July to 1 August. In the Laser Radial event, points were awarded to the athletes based on their placement in each of the ten races with the best nine out of ten scores counted for the final placement, and determining the qualification to the medal race. Gordon ended in the 43rd and penultimate place amongst the 44 competitors, with 368 net points and did not qualify for the medal race.

Athlete	Event	Race											Net points	Final rank
Athlete	Event	1	2	3	4	5	6	7	8	9	10	M*	Net points	Final rank
Jalese Gordon	Women's Laser Radial	42	~~43~~	42	43	41	42	37	42	38	41	EL	368	43

M = Medal race; EL = Eliminated – did not advance into the medal race

== Swimming ==
As per the Fédération internationale de natation (FINA) guidelines, a NOC was permitted to enter a maximum of two qualified athletes in each individual event, who have achieved the Olympic Qualifying Time (OQT). If the quota was not filled, one athlete per event was allowed to enter per NOC, provided they achieved the Olympic Selection Time (OST) in competitions approved by World Aquatics in the period between 1 March 2019 to 27 June 2021. If the overeall quota was not met, FINA allowed NOCs to enter one swimmer per gender under a universality place even if they have not achieved the standard entry times (OQT/OST). Antigua and Barbuda received a universality invitation from FINA to send two top-ranked swimmers (one per gender) in their respective individual events to the Olympics, based on the FINA points as on 28 June 2021.

The swimming events were held at the Tokyo Aquatics Centre. Samantha Roberts competed in the women's 50 metre freestyle and Stefano Mitchell competed in the men's 100 metre freestyle, and neither advanced past the heats. This was the second consecutive Olympic appearance for Roberts after her debut at the 2016 Summer Olympics, and the only Olympic appearance for Mitchell.

Athlete	Event	Heat		Semifinal		Final	
Athlete	Event	Time	Rank	Time	Rank	Time	Rank
Stefano Mitchell	Men's 100 m freestyle	51.64	51	Did not advance			
Samantha Roberts	Women's 50 m freestyle	27.63	54	Did not advance			

== See also ==
- Antigua and Barbuda at the 2019 Pan American Games
