= Antigua and Barbuda at the 2008 Summer Olympics =

- IOC code: ANT
- NOC: Antigua and Barbuda National Olympic Committee

in Beijing
- Competitors: 5 in 2 sports
- Flag bearer: James Grayman
- Medals: Gold 0 Silver 0 Bronze 0 Total 0

Summer Olympics appearances (overview)
- 1976; 1980; 1984; 1988; 1992; 1996; 2000; 2004; 2008; 2012; 2016; 2020; 2024; 2028

Antigua and Barbuda competed at the 2008 Summer Olympics in Beijing, China, submitting a delegation that included athletes Daniel Bailey, Brendan Christian, James Grayman, and Sonia Williams in track and field events, and Kareem Valentine in swimming. Antigua and Barbuda's appearance in Beijing marked its eighth appearance at the Summer Olympics since the nation's debut at the 1976 Summer Olympics in Montréal, Canada. There were no medalists from Antigua and Barbuda in 2008, although Bailey reached the quarterfinals and Christian the semifinals of their respective events.

== Background ==
Antigua and Barbuda participated in eight Olympic Games between its debut at the 1976 Summer Olympics in Montréal and its 2008 appearance in Beijing, competing in every edition except for the 1980 Summer Olympics in Moscow. The 2008 Summer Olympic delegation was smaller than those of the 1980s and 1990s, when they were composed of thirteen or more athletes, but, with five participants, it was the same size that it had been at the 2004 Summer Olympics in Athens. As of the conclusion of the Beijing Games, no Antiguan or Barbudan athlete has won a medal, although Brendan Christian progressed to semifinals and Daniel Bailey to quarterfinals of their respective events in 2008. At the 2008 games Kareem Valentine was the youngest athlete at fifteen years of age and Sonia Williams was the eldest at twenty-nine.

The Foreign Ministry of Antigua and Barbuda supported the Chinese handling of the civil unrest in Tibet, an issue marred in controversy due to self-immolations by Tibetans and numerous crackdowns on protesters, and expressed support for Chinese efforts to host the Olympics in Beijing despite the controversy. The flag-bearer for the Games was James Grayman, an Antiguan athlete.

== Athletics ==
=== Men's 100 meters ===
Antigua Track Club athlete Daniel Everton "Bakka" Bailey competed in the men's 100 m dash on behalf of Antigua and Barbuda and was that year's only Antiguan to take part in the event. His participation in Beijing marked his second appearance in the Olympic games, following the 2004 Summer Olympics in Athens. In Beijing he was assigned to Heat 1 during the first round on August 14, competing against Usain Bolt of Jamaica and Vicente Lima of Brazil, among others. Bailey ran the event in 10.24 seconds, coming in second place in a heat of eight people, placing behind heat leader Bolt by 0.04 seconds and ahead of Lima by 0.02 seconds. Overall, in the first round, Bailey tied Trinidad and Tobago's Richard Thompson for tenth place out of eighty athletes.

Bailey advanced to the quarterfinals, which occurred later that day. Bailey was placed in Heat 5 against, among others, the United States' Walter Dix and Jamaica's Asafa Powell, completing the second round in 10.23 seconds. He ranked fourth out of eight in the event, falling behind Derrick Atkins of the Bahamas (3rd place with a time of 10.14 seconds) and ahead of Ghana's Aziz Zakari (5th place with a time of 10.24 seconds). Overall, Bailey tied Japan's Naoki Tsukahara for twentieth place out of forty remaining athletes and did not progress to semifinals.

=== Men's 200 meters ===
Former University of Texas at Austin student Brendan Kyle Akeem Christian participated on behalf of Antigua and Barbuda in the 200 m dash at the Beijing Olympics. Christian, who broke the best American high school time in the 100 m and 200 m dashes, is the son of former Olympian Donald Christian, a cyclist for Antigua and Barbuda at the 1976 Summer Olympics. Brendan's participation marked his second Olympic appearance, having competed in the 2004 Summer Olympics. In Beijing he raced in Heat 8 during the first round of the event on August 17. He ranked second place out of eight athletes, falling behind heat leader Aaron Armstrong of Trinidad and Tobago by 0.01 seconds and placing ahead of Canada's Jared Connaughton by 0.02 seconds. Overall, Christian tied Trinidad and Tobago's Rondel Sorrillo and Japan's Shinji Takahira for ninth place out of sixty-six athletes.

The next day Christian participated in the quarterfinals and was placed in Heat 3 against athletes that included Churandy Martina of the Netherlands Antilles and Kristof Beyens of Belgium. Christian took first place in the race with a time of 20.26 seconds, beating second-place finalist Martina by 0.18 seconds and ranking second overall out of thirty-two athletes. Christian fell behind the overall quarterfinal leader Brian Dzingai of Zimbabwe by 0.03 seconds and defeated the United States' Walter Dix by 0.01 seconds. Christian advanced to semifinals, which took place on the same day.

Christian competed in Heat 2 against Usain Bolt of Jamaica, Shawn Crawford of the United States, and Kim Collins of Saint Kitts and Nevis, among others, and ranked fifth out of eight after running a time of 20.29 seconds. Collins ran 0.04 seconds faster than Christian, while Mauritius' Stephen Buckland ran 0.11 seconds slower. Christian did not advance to the final round.

=== Men's high jump ===
James Grayman competed in the Beijing Olympics as Antigua and Barbuda's sole high jumper, where he participated in the second qualifying heat on August 17 against athletes that included Brazil's Jesse Lima and the Czech Republic's Tomáš Janků. Grayman cleared a 2.20 meter height on his second attempt, placing behind tenth-place heat finalist Dmytro Dem'yanyuk of Ukraine, who made the height on his first try, and eleventh-place heat finalist Linus Thörnblad of Sweden, who also made the height on his second attempt, but had fewer overall misses than Grayman. He finished ahead of the three thirteenth-place heat finalists (Italy's Alessandro Talotti, Spain's Javier Bermejo, and Botswana's Kabelo Kgosiemang) and the sixteenth-place heat finalist (Hup Wei Lee of Malaysia) who achieved the same height, but did so in three tries. Overall, Grayman ranked 28th out of 40 competitors and did not advance to finals on August 19.

=== Women's 100 meters ===
Sonia Williams competed for Antigua and Barbuda in the women's 100 m dash and was the only female member of the Antiguan national delegation in Beijing. Her participation these Games marked her second Olympic appearance, her first having been at the 1996 Summer Olympics in Atlanta. In Beijing Williams participated in the first round of the event on August 15, when she was placed in Heat 5 against athletes that included Belgian Kim Gevaert and Belarusian Yuliya Nestsiarenka. She completed the race in 12.04 seconds, finishing sixth out of eight athletes. Guam's Cora Alicto, the seventh place finalist, ran 1.35 seconds slower than Williams, while the fifth place finalist, Chisato Fukushima of Japan, ran 0.3 seconds faster. Gevaert, who was the heat leader, earned a time that was 0.71 seconds faster than Williams'. Overall, Williams ranked 54th out of 85 athletes and did not progress to quarterfinals.

=== Summary ===
Men
Track & road events

Athlete	Event	Heat		Quarterfinal		Semifinal		Final	
Athlete	Event	Result	Rank	Result	Rank	Result	Rank	Result	Rank
Daniel Bailey	100 m	10.24	2 Q	10.23	4	Did not advance			
Brendan Christian	200 m	20.58	2 Q	20.26	1 Q	20.29	5	Did not advance	

Field events

Athlete	Event	Qualification		Final	
Athlete	Event	Distance	Position	Distance	Position
James Grayman	High jump	2.20	28	Did not advance	

Women
Track & road events

Athlete	Event	Heat		Quarterfinal		Semifinal		Final	
Athlete	Event	Result	Rank	Result	Rank	Result	Rank	Result	Rank
Sonia Williams	100 m	12.04	6	Did not advance					

Key

- Note–Ranks given for track events are within the athlete's heat only
- Q = Qualified for the next round
- q = Qualified for the next round as a fastest loser or, in field events, by position without achieving the qualifying target
- NR = National record
- N/A = Round not applicable for the event
- Bye = Athlete not required to compete in round

== Swimming ==
Fifteen-year-old Kareem "Grinny" Valentine Sandoval was the only person to compete in a swimming event from Antigua and Barbuda in 2008. At the time he was in his third year in high school. He competed in the men's 50 m freestyle, taking part in the August 14 preliminaries. His participation in the event marked the fifth time that he had swum in a pool, as he usually practiced in the ocean. During the course of his event Valentine was placed in Heat 2 of 12 against swimmers that included Thepphithak Chindavong of Laos. Valentine swam the event in 31.23 seconds, ranking fifth among six competitors. Stany Kempompo Ngangola of the Democratic Republic of the Congo (6th) finished nearly four seconds behind him with a time of 35.19 seconds, while Chindavong led the heat with a time of 29.31 seconds. Overall, Valentine ranked 96th out of 97 swimmers in the event and did not advance to semifinals, which were held that same day.

Men

Athlete	Event	Heat		Semifinal		Final	
Athlete	Event	Time	Rank	Time	Rank	Time	Rank
Kareem Valentine	50 m freestyle	31.23	96	Did not advance			

== See also ==
- Antigua and Barbuda at the 2006 Commonwealth Games
- Antigua and Barbuda at the 2007 Pan American Games
- Antigua and Barbuda at the 2010 Central American and Caribbean Games
