= Antigua and Barbuda at the 2024 Summer Olympics =

- IOC code: ANT
- NOC: Antigua and Barbuda National Olympic Committee

in Paris, France 26 July 2024 – 11 August 2024
- Competitors: 5 (3 men and 2 women) in 3 sports
- Flag bearers (opening): Cejhae Greene & Joella Lloyd
- Flag bearer (closing): Cejhae Greene
- Medals: Gold 0 Silver 0 Bronze 0 Total 0

Summer Olympics appearances (overview)
- 1976; 1980; 1984; 1988; 1992; 1996; 2000; 2004; 2008; 2012; 2016; 2020; 2024

Antigua and Barbuda competed at the 2024 Summer Olympics in Paris, France. It was the nation's twelfth appearance at the Summer Olympics, since its debut at the 1976 Summer Olympics in Montreal. The Antigua and Barbuda delegation consisted of five athletes competing in three sports. The country did not win any medals at the Games.

== Background ==
The Antigua and Barbuda National Olympic Committee was founded in 1965 and was recognized by the International Olympic Committee (IOC) in 1976. The nation made its first Olympic appearance at the 1976 Summer Olympics in Montreal. Since then, it has competed in every Olympics except the 1980 Summer Olympics in Moscow. The 2024 Summer Olympics was the nation's twelfth appearance at the Summer Olympics.

The 2024 Summer Olympics was held in Paris, France, between 26 July and 11 August 2024. Sprinters Joella Lloyd and Cejhae Greene were the country's flag bearers at the opening ceremony. Greene served as the flag bearer during the closing ceremony. Antigua and Barbuda did not win a medal at the Games.

== Competitors ==
The team from Antigua and Barbuda consisted of five athletes competing in three sports.

Sport	Men	Women	Total
Athletics	1	1	2
Sailing	1	0	1
Swimming	1	1	2
Total	3	2	5

== Athletics ==
As per the governing body World Athletics (WA), a NOC was allowed to enter up to three qualified athletes in each individual event if the Olympic Qualifying Standards (OQS) had been met during the qualification period from 1 July 2023 to 30 June 2024. Two track and field athletes from Antigua and Barbuda achieved the entry standards for the 2024 Summer Olympics, Cejhae Greene in the men's 100 m and Joella Lloyd in the women's 100 m.

Greene studied in the Florida State University, and had won a bronze medal in the 100 metres at the 2012 Central American and Caribbean Junior Championships in Athletics in San Salvador, El Salvador. This was his third consecutive Olympic participation after his debut in the 2016 Summer Olympics.

Lloyd studied the University of Tennessee. She set her personal best of 23.39 in the 200 metres and won the 60 metres race at the SEC Championships in February 2021. She set a new Anational record in the 100 meters in May 2021 with a time of 11.19 seconds at the Tennessee Challenge in Knoxville. She won the a bronze and silver medal in the 2021 NACAC U20 Championships. This was her second consecutive Olympic participation after his debut in the 2020 Summer Olympics.

The athletics events were held at the Stade de France in Saint Denis. In the men's 100 m, Greene finished fourth in the heats with a time of 10.25 seconds, and did not qualify for the semifinals. In the women's 100 m, Lloyd finished fifth in the qualifying heat with a time of 11.37 seconds and did not qualify for the semifinals.

Track & road events

Athlete	Event	Preliminary		Heat		Repechage		Semifinal		Final	
Athlete	Event	Time	Rank	Time	Rank	Time	Rank	Time	Rank	Time	Rank
Cejhae Greene	Men's 100 m	Bye		10.17	4	—N/a		Did not advance			
Joella Lloyd	Women's 100 m	Bye		11.37	5	—N/a		Did not advance			

Key

- Note–Ranks given for track events are within the athlete's heat only
- Q = Qualified for the next round
- q = Qualified for the next round as a fastest loser or, in field events, by position without achieving the qualifying target
- NR = National record
- N/A = Round not applicable for the event
- Bye = Athlete not required to compete in round

== Sailing ==
The qualification period for the sailing event commenced at the 2023 Sailing World Championships in The Hague, Netherlands where about forty percent of the total quota was awarded to the top NOCs. Further quota places were allocated at the continental qualifier events and the Last Chance Regatta in 2024. Seven places were distributed to sailors representing the highest-finishing, not previously qualified NOCs at the 2024 ILCA World Championships. Antigua and Barbuda qualified one boat for the men's Formula Kite through the 2023 Pan American Games in Santiago, Chile.

Tiger Tyson represented Antigua and Barbuda, and was the first male sailor from the country to participate in the Olympics since Karl James in the 2000 Summer Olympics. He was born in Auckland, New Zealand, and the family settled in Antigua when Tyson was two years old. He began kitesurfing at the age of seven years along with his father. In 2022, he dropped out of school to focus on the Olympic qualification. He qualified for the Olympics after he had won the silver medal in the men's kite event at the 2023 Pan American Games.

The kiteboarding events were held off the coast of Marseille from 4 to 9 August. The sports made its Olympic debut at the Games. The 20 competitors were scheduled to take part in 20 races over the five day period. However, due to prevailing weather conditions, only seven out of the 16 first round races were possible. The scores were calculated based on the best five of the seven rounds, and only the ten best sailors progressed to the next round. Tyson, who was ranked 17th with 69 accumulated points, did not make it to further rounds.

Athlete	Event	Opening series																						Quarterfinal	Semifinal								Final							
Athlete	Event	1	2	3	4	5	6	7	8	9	10	11	12	13	14	15	16	17	18	19	20	Net points	Rank	Rank	1	2	3	4	5	6	Total	Rank	1	2	3	4	5	6	Total	Rank
Tiger Tyson	Men's Formula Kite	16	~~19~~	~~19~~	17	9	18	9	Cancelled													69	17	Did not advance																17

M = Medal race; EL = Eliminated – did not advance into the medal race

== Swimming ==
As per the World Aquatics guidelines, a NOC was permitted to enter a maximum of two qualified athletes in each individual event, who have achieved the Olympic Qualifying Time. One athlete per event will be allowed to enter if they meet the Olympic Selection Time if the quota is not filled. NOCs were allowed to enter swimmers (one per gender) under a universality place even if no one achieved the standard entry times. Antigua and Barbuda sent two swimmers to compete at the 2024 Paris Olympics.

The swimming events were held at the Paris La Défense Arena at Nanterre. Jadon Wuilliez competed in the men's 100 m breaststroke and Ellie Shaw competed in the women's 100 m breaststroke, and neither advanced past the heats. This was the debut Olympic appearance for both the swimmers. Shaw was Antigua and Barbuda's 2023 Junior Sportswoman of the Year.

Athlete	Event	Heat		Semifinal		Final	
Athlete	Event	Time	Rank	Time	Rank	Time	Rank
Jadon Wuilliez	Men's 100 m breaststroke	1:02.70	26	Did not advance			
Ellie Shaw	Women's 100 m breaststroke	1:14.78	35	Did not advance			

== See also ==
- Antigua and Barbuda at the 2023 Pan American Games
