= Antigua at the 1976 Summer Olympics =

Antigua and Barbuda at the 1976 Summer Olympics
- IOC code: ANT
- NOC: Antigua and Barbuda National Olympic Committee

in Montreal Canada
- Competitors: 10 (10 men and 0 women) in 2 sports
- Flag bearer: Fred Sowerby
- Medals: Gold 0 Silver 0 Bronze 0 Total 0

Summer Olympics appearances (overview)
- 1976; 1980; 1984; 1988; 1992; 1996; 2000; 2004; 2008; 2012; 2016; 2020; 2024; 2028

The Associated State of Antigua competed in the Olympic Games for the first time at the 1976 Summer Olympics in Montreal, Quebec, Canada. Ten competitors, all men, took part in eleven events in two sports.

== Athletics ==
Men
Track & road events

Athlete	Event	Heat		Quarterfinal		Semifinal		Final	
Athlete	Event	Result	Rank	Result	Rank	Result	Rank	Result	Rank
Cuthbert Jacobs	200 m	21.50	2 Q	21.33	6	did not advance			
Conrad Mainwaring	110 m hurdles	15.54	8	did not advance					
Conrad Mainwaring	400 m hurdles	54.67	6	did not advance					
Fred Sowerby	400 m	48.12	5 Q	48.03	7	did not advance			
Calvin Greenaway; Paul Richards; Everton Cornelius; Elroy Turner	4 × 100 m relay	41.84	7	did not advance					
Gerald Wisdom; Paul Richards; Elroy Turner; Fred Sowerby	4 × 400 m relay	3:09.66	8	did not advance					

Field events

Athlete	Event	Qualification		Final	
Athlete	Event	Distance	Position	Distance	Position
Calvin Greenaway	Long jump	6.96	29	did not advance	
Maxwell Peters	Triple jump	14.94	21	did not advance	

== Cycling ==
Two cyclists represented Antigua and Barbuda in 1976.

=== Track ===
1000m time trial

Athlete	Event	Time	Rank
Donald Christian	Men's 1000m time trial	DNF	

Men's Sprint

Athlete	Event	Round 1	Repechage 1	Round 2	Repechage 2	Repechage Finals	Quarterfinals	Semifinals	Final	
Athlete	Event	Time Speed (km/h)	Rank	Opposition Time Speed (km/h)	Opposition Time Speed (km/h)	Opposition Time Speed (km/h)	Opposition Time Speed (km/h)	Opposition Time Speed (km/h)	Opposition Time Speed (km/h)	Rank
Patrick Spencer	Men's sprint	Vaarten (BEL); Barczewski (USA); L	Pieters (NED); Fumic (YUG); L	did not advance						25

Pursuit

Athlete	Event	Qualification		Round 1/8	Quarterfinals	Semifinals	Final	
Athlete	Event	Time	Rank	Opposition Time	Opposition Time	Opposition Time	Opposition Time	Rank
Donald Christian	Men's individual pursuit	DNF		did not advance				25

== See also ==
- Antigua and Barbuda at the 1979 Pan American Games
