= Antigua and Barbuda at the 2000 Summer Olympics =

- IOC code: ANT
- NOC: Antigua and Barbuda National Olympic Committee

in Sydney
- Competitors: 3 (2 men and 1 woman) in 2 sports
- Flag bearer: Heather Samuel
- Medals: Gold 0 Silver 0 Bronze 0 Total 0

Summer Olympics appearances (overview)
- 1976; 1980; 1984; 1988; 1992; 1996; 2000; 2004; 2008; 2012; 2016; 2020; 2024; 2028

Antigua and Barbuda competed at the 2000 Summer Olympics in Sydney, Australia. It was the nation's sixth appearance at the Summer Olympics, since its debut at the 1976 Summer Olympics in Montreal. The Antigua and Barbuda delegation consisted of three athletes competing in two sports. The country did not win any medals at the Games.

== Background ==
The Antigua and Barbuda National Olympic Committee was founded in 1965 and was recognized by the International Olympic Committee (IOC) in 1976. The nation made its first Olympic appearance at the 1976 Summer Olympics in Montreal. Since then, it has competed in every Olympics except the 1980 Summer Olympics in Moscow. The 2000 Summer Olympics was the nation's sixth appearance at the Summer Olympics.

The 2000 Summer Olympics was held in Sydney, Australia, between 15 September to 1 October 2000. Sprinter Heather Samuel carried the flag for the second time at the opening ceremony. Antigua and Barbuda did not win a medal at the Games.

== Competitors ==
The team from Antigua and Barbuda consisted of three athletes competing in two sports.

Sport	Men	Women	Total
Athletics	1	1	2
Sailing	1	0	1
Total	2	1	3

== Athletics ==
Two athletes from Antigua and Barbuda qualified for the Games. N'Kosie Barnes competed in the men's 200 m and Heather Samuel in the women's 100 m and women's 200 m.

Samuel is an Olympic veteran and was competing in her third Summer Olympics after her debut at the 1992 Summer Olympics. She won a bronze in the 1995 Pan American Games and a silver and bronze medal each in the 1990. This was Barnes' second Olympic appearance after his debut at the previous 1996 Summer Olympics. He had set a personal best time of 21 seconds in the men's 200 metres in 1999, prior to the Olympics.

The athletics events were held at the Olympic Stadium, Olympic Park, Sydney. The men's 200 metres event was held from 27 and 28 September 2000. Barnes set a time of 21.82 seconds, finished eighth and last in heat nine of the preliminary round and did not advance to the semifinal. In the women's 100 and 200 metres events, Samuel did not make it out of the preliminary rounds. In the 100 metres, she finished fourth in the fifth heat with a time of 11.62 seconds. In the 200 metres, she finished last in the fifth heat, with a time of 24.44 seconds, way below her personal best of 22.9 seconds.

Athlete	Event	Heat		Quarterfinal		Semifinal		Final	
Athlete	Event	Result	Rank	Result	Rank	Result	Rank	Result	Rank
N'Kosie Barnes	Men's 200 m	21.82	8	Did not advance					
Heather Samuel	Women's 100 m	11.62	4	Did not advance					
Heather Samuel	Women's 200 m	24.44	8	Did not advance					

== Sailing ==
Karl James represented Antigua and Barbuda in the sailing event, and was making his second Summer Olympic appearance at the Games.

The open Laser event was held between 20 and 29 September 2000 at the Rushcutters Bay Marina, Rose Bay off the coast of New South Wales. There were eleven rounds, and the best nine results were taken for the final classification. The contestants were awarded points based on their finish in each of the rounds, equal to the rankings. The racer who accumulated the least points was chosen as the eventual winner. Out of the 43 contestants, James finished 26th in the first race. However, he slipped down the order to finish in the thirties in seven of the next ten rounds. He registered a best place finish of 25th in the sixth race. In the final classification, he was ranked 31sst with 281 points.

Athlete	Event	Race											Score	Rank
Athlete	Event	1	2	3	4	5	6	7	8	9	10	11	Score	Rank
Karl James	Laser	26	34	27	34	~~38~~	25	29	33	35	~~38~~	38	281	31

== See also ==
- Antigua and Barbuda at the 1999 Pan American Games
