= Antigua and Barbuda Sailing Association =

Sports governing body in Antigua and Barbuda

- IOC nation: Antigua and Barbuda (ANT)
- Sport: Sailing

AFFILIATIONS
- International federation: International Sailing Federation (ISAF)
- National Olympic Committee: The Antigua and Barbuda Olympic Association
- President: Karl James
- Country: Antigua and Barbuda
- Secretary General: Susan Elliot Beatty

FINANCE
- Company status: Association

The Antigua and Barbuda Sailing Association is recognised by World Sailing as the governing body for the sport of sailing in Antigua and Barbuda. The current president of the association is Karl James, who succeeded founder and president of over thirty years Geoffrey Pidduck.
