= Selkridge =

Selkridge is a surname. Notable people with the surname include:

- Barbara Selkridge (born 1971), Antiguan sprinter
- Oral Selkridge (born 1962), Antiguan sprinter
