= Antigua and Barbuda at the 2016 Summer Olympics =

- IOC code: ANT
- NOC: Antigua and Barbuda National Olympic Committee

in Rio de Janeiro
- Competitors: 9 in 2 sports
- Flag bearer: Daniel Bailey
- Medals: Gold 0 Silver 0 Bronze 0 Total 0

Summer Olympics appearances (overview)
- 1976; 1980; 1984; 1988; 1992; 1996; 2000; 2004; 2008; 2012; 2016; 2020; 2024; 2028

Antigua and Barbuda competed at the 2016 Summer Olympics in Rio de Janeiro, Brazil, from 5 to 21 August 2016. It was the nation's tenth appearance at the Summer Olympics, since its debut at the 1976 Summer Olympics in Montreal. The Antigua and Barbuda delegation consisted of nine athletes competing in two sports. The country did not win any medals at the Games.

== Background ==
The Antigua and Barbuda National Olympic Committee was founded in 1965 and was recognized by the International Olympic Committee (IOC) in 1976. The nation made its first Olympic appearance at the 1976 Summer Olympics in Montreal. Since then, it has competed in every Olympics except the 1980 Summer Olympics in Moscow. The 2016 Summer Olympics was the nation's ninth appearance at the Summer Olympics.

The 2016 Summer Olympics was held in Rio de Janeiro, Brazil, between 5 and 21 August 2016. Sprinter Daniel Bailey carried the flag for the third time at the opening ceremony. Antigua and Barbuda did not win a medal at the Games. Noah Mascoll-Gomes was the flag bearer during the closing ceremony.

== Competitors ==
The team from Antigua and Barbuda consisted of nine athletes competing in two sports. The country sent the nation's largest roster to the Games since the 1996 Summer Olympics. The team included seven men and two women.

Sport	Men	Women	Total
Athletics	6	1	7
Swimming	1	1	2
Total	7	2	9

== Athletics ==
As per World Athletics, a NOC was allowed to enter up to three qualified athletes in each individual event if the Olympic Qualifying Standard time was met during the qualifying period from 1 May 2015 to 11 July 2016. All remaining quotas were allocated by the Tripartite Commission as universality invitations. Antigua and Barbuda had seven athletes, Daniel Bailey and Cejhae Greene in the men's 100 metres, Miguel Francis in the men's 200 metres, Priscilla Frederick in the women's high jump, and the men's 4 × 100 m relay team.

=== Track events ===
Bailey took up running at the age of 11, and began training from the age of 16. He made his Olympics debut at the 2004 Summer Olympics, and set a best time of 10.23 seconds in the semifinals in the 2008 Summer Olympics. He set a personal best time of 9.99 seconds at the South American Grande Prêmio Brasil Caixa meet, becoming the first athlete to run under ten seconds on the continent. He set a new national record of 9.91 seconds later. He won silver medals at the 2010 Central American and Caribbean Games and the 2010 IAAF Continental Cup. He was Antigua and Barbuda's flag bearer at the 2012 Summer Olympics but did not qualify from his preliminary heat.

Greene studied in the Florida State University, and had won a bronze medal in the 100 metres at the 2012 Central American and Caribbean Junior Championships in Athletics in San Salvador, El Salvador. This was his debut Olympic participation. Francis, who was born in Montserrat, a British overseas territory, made his Olympic debut at the Games. After the Olympics, he requested a transfer of allegiance to Great Britain.

The athletics events were held at the Estádio Olímpico João Havelange in Rio de Janeiro. In the men's 100 metres, held on 13 August 2016, Bailey and Greene set identical times of 10.2 seconds in their respective heats to qualify for the semifinals. However, in the semifinals, Greene finished seventh with a time of 10.13 seconds, while Bailey did not start the race. In the men's 200 metres, Francis failed to register a start in the preliminary heats and did not advance further.

Greene formed a team with Jared Jarvis, Chavaughn Walsh and Tahir Walsh for the men's relay event. Chavaughn started off, with Greene and Jarvis running the following legs, and Tahir running the anchor leg. The team finished sixth in the first heat, and failed to qualify further.

Athlete	Event	Heat		Quarterfinal		Semifinal		Final	
Athlete	Event	Result	Rank	Result	Rank	Result	Rank	Result	Rank
Daniel Bailey	Men's 100 m	Bye		10.20	2 Q	DNS		Did not advance	
Cejhae Greene	Men's 100 m	Bye		10.20	4 Q	10.13	7	Did not advance	
Miguel Francis	Men's 200 m	DNS		—N/a		Did not advance			
Daniel Bailey; Cejhae Greene; Miguel Francis; Jared Jarvis; Chavaughn Walsh; Tahir Walsh	Men's 4 × 100 m relay	38.44 SB	6	—N/a				Did not advance	

Key

- Note–Ranks given for track events are within the athlete's heat only
- Q = Qualified for the next round
- q = Qualified for the next round as a fastest loser or, in field events, by position without achieving the qualifying target
- NR = National record
- N/A = Round not applicable for the event
- Bye = Athlete not required to compete in round

=== Field events ===
Frederick was born in New York City. She had won silver medals in the 2014 Central American and Caribbean Games, and the 2015 Pan American Games in high jump. This was her Olympic debut. In the women's high jump, she cleared 1.85 metres in her first attempt, and 1.89 metres in her third attempt. However, she failed to jump any higher,a and finished 28th out of the 35 participants.

Athlete	Event	Qualification		Final	
Athlete	Event	Distance	Position	Distance	Position
Priscilla Frederick	Women's high jump	1.89	28	Did not advance	

== Swimming ==
As per World Aquatics, a NOC was permitted to enter a maximum of two qualified athletes in each individual event who achieved the Olympic Qualifying Time. NOCs were otherwise allowed to enter two swimmers (one per gender) under a universality place. Antigua and Barbuda entered two swimmers at the Games through universality places.

Noah Mascoll-Gomes competed in the men's 200 m freestyle and Samantha Roberts in the women's 50 m freestyle. This was the first Olympic participation for both the athletes. Mascoll-Gomes was born in Canada, and represented Antigua and Barbuda in the 2014 Youth Summer Olympics. Roberts was born in Memphis, Tennessee, and was the youngest of the contingent at sixteen years of age.

The swimming events were held at the Olympic Aquatics Stadium in the Rio de Janeiro Olympic Park. Both athletes competed in their respective qualifying heats and did not advance to the semi-finals.

Athlete	Event	Heat		Semifinal		Final	
Athlete	Event	Time	Rank	Time	Rank	Time	Rank
Noah Mascoll-Gomes	Men's 200 m freestyle	1:53.16	44	Did not advance			
Samantha Roberts	Women's 50 m freestyle	27.95	57	Did not advance			

== See also ==
- Antigua and Barbuda at the 2015 Pan American Games
