= Dine Potter =

Personal information
- Nationality: Antigua and Barbuda
- Born: 4 September 1975 (age 50)

Sport
- Sport: Sprinting
- Event(s): 4 × 100 metres relay 4 x 400 metres relay

Dine Potter (born 4 September 1975) is an Antigua and Barbuda sprinter. She competed in the women's 4 × 100 metres relay and the women's 4 × 400 metres relay together with Sonia Williams, Charmaine Thomas and Heather Samuel at the 1996 Summer Olympics.
