= Athletics at the 2016 Summer Olympics – Men's 100 metres =

Men's 100 metres at the Games of the XXXI Olympiad
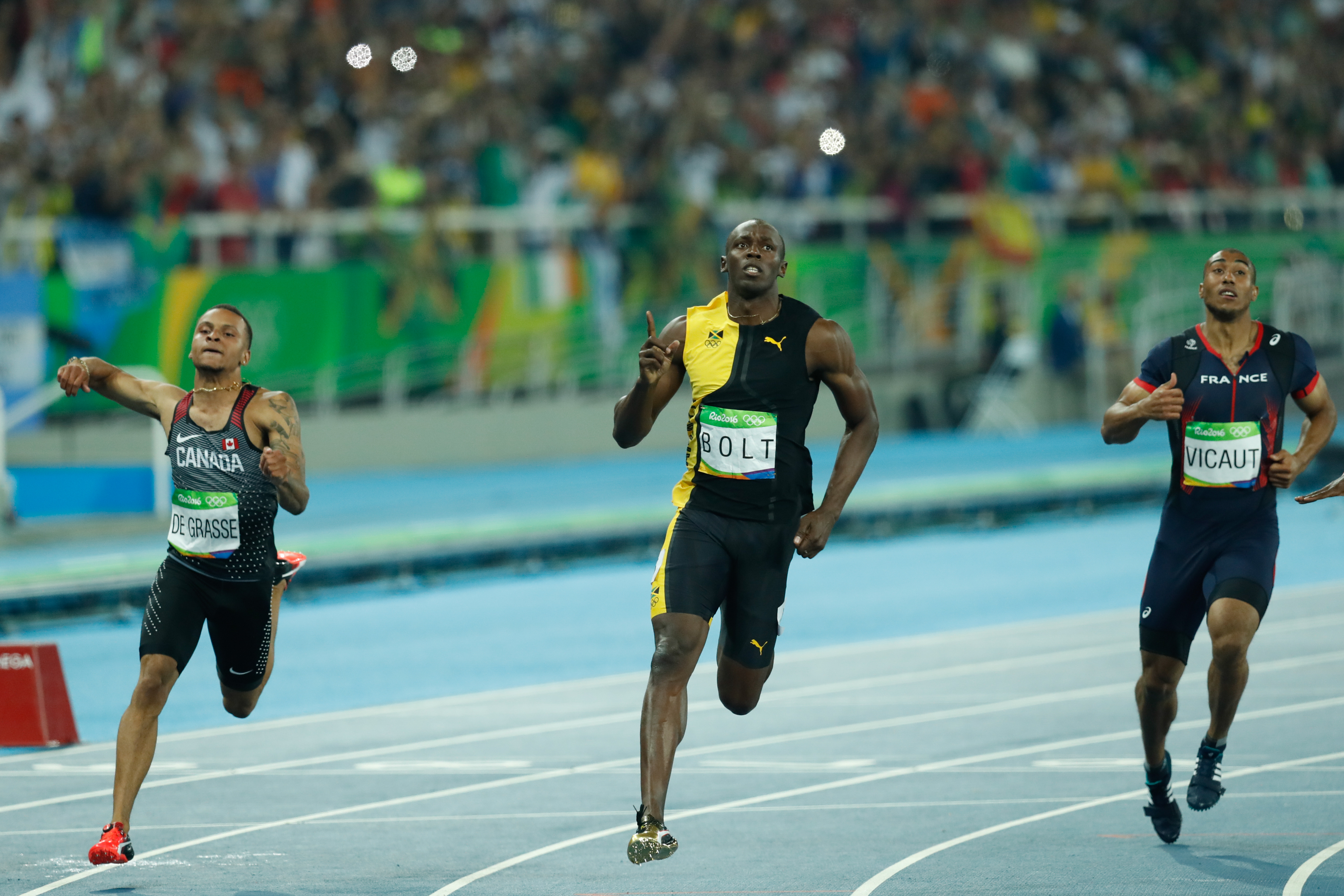
- De Grasse, Bolt and Vicaut cross the finish line during the final of the Men's 100 metres
- Venue: Olympic Stadium
- Dates: 13 August 2016 (Preliminary round & heats); 14 August 2016 (semi-final & final)
- Competitors: 84 from 57 nations
- Winning time: 9.81

Medalists
1st place, gold medalist(s)		Usain Bolt	Jamaica
2nd place, silver medalist(s)		Justin Gatlin	United States
3rd place, bronze medalist(s)		Andre De Grasse	Canada

Official Video Highlights

The men's 100 metres event at the 2016 Summer Olympics took place between 13–14 August at the Olympic Stadium. 84 athletes from 57 nations competed.

== Background ==
Billed as one of the most anticipated races in history, Usain Bolt of Jamaica entered as the world record holder, defending Olympic champion and the reigning world champion. He sought to become the first man to win three Olympic 100 m titles, en route to the "Triple-Triple"; 100m, 200m and 4 × 100 metres relay gold medals at three consecutive Olympic Games. However, with recurring injury problems affecting his early season, he was ranked 4th in the year with 9.88 seconds, and only raced three 100 m finals before pulling out of the Jamaican Trials; he only qualified for the Olympics through a medical exemption. Meanwhile, his biggest rival was Justin Gatlin of the United States, the world leader for three consecutive years who had threatened Bolt's world titles in 2013 and more prominently in 2015. Despite also having injuries in the early season, the 34-year old Gatlin also went unbeaten in the season, going on to win the American Trials in a world-leading 9.80 seconds.

Trayvon Bromell, joint-bronze medalist at the 2015 World Championship and the world junior record holder, finished second to Gatlin at the American Trials with the second-fastest time of the year. Defending silver medallist and joint-second fastest man in history Yohan Blake, who won the Jamaican Trials in Bolt's absence, showed a strong return to form since his near career-ending injuries from 2013–2015. Nickel Ashmeade and Marvin Bracy filled out the Jamaican and American rosters. Meanwhile, France's Jimmy Vicaut, co-European record holder, equaled the 9.86 record once again, and Akani Simbine was the last man under 9.9 seconds that year, with a South African record of 9.89. Other contenders included the other bronze medalist in the 2015 World Championship Andre De Grasse, 5th ranked Femi Ogunode who equaled his Asian record of 9.91, and the British trio of James Dasaolu, James Ellington, and Chijindu Ujah.

Macedonia and Palestine competed for the first time in the event. The United States made its 27th appearance in the event, the most of any country, having missed only the boycotted 1980 Games.

== Summary ==
In the preliminary round, Hassan Saaid of the Maldives and Rodman Teltull of Palau were the fastest to progress, both managing under 10.6 seconds. Siueni Filimone qualified but pulled a hamstring at the finish and was unable to compete in the next round.

Gatlin was the fastest in the heats at 10.01, with Bolt not too far behind at 10.07. Kemarley Brown, Zhenye Xie and Ben Youssef Meite were surprise heat winners, while Vicaut and Bracy amazingly only qualified on time. The most prominent casualties were Ogunode, Ellington, European champion Churandy Martina, sub-10 Canadian Aaron Brown, 2008 silver medalist Richard Thompson, and his teammate Keston Bledman.

Vicaut made up for his sluggish heat by winning the first semifinal in 9.95. In the second semifinal, Bolt silenced doubters by casually jogging 9.86 to win; Bolt had done the same in 9.87 and 9.85 at the previous two Olympic games, proving that he was in excellent shape. Andre De Grasse finished second in 9.92, equaling his personal best and boosting his status as a medal contender by tenfold. De Grasse also appeared to be mimicking Bolt, glancing at the field every time Bolt did. Gatlin won the last semifinal in an easy 9.94, then immediately left the arena to begin preparing for the final.

In the final, Gatlin's introduction prompted negative reception from the crowd, while Bolt's introduction filled the stadium with cheers once again. At the gun, Gatlin got the best start, slightly ahead of Simbine and Bromell to his inside. Two lanes outside, Bolt was behind and stayed level with De Grasse and Meite. By the middle of the race, Gatlin had 2 metres on Bolt and it seemed as though the Jamaican would be defeated. However, Bolt quickly hit top speed and surged ahead, catching the American at 75 meters and pulling away at 80. Usain thumped his chest as he crossed the line in first, making history as the first man in history to win 3 consecutive Olympic golds in the 100m. Gatlin was forced to settle for the silver and was nearly caught by De Grasse, who pipped Blake and Simbine for the Bronze medal.

Usain Bolt's win broke 2 records; becoming the first person to win the 100 meter race 3 times and also to medal 3 times in the 100 meter race. Previously, only Carl Lewis had won two gold medals in the 100m, a feat which Bolt had matched at the London 2012 Summer Olympics. However, finishing several hundredths of a second later, Gatlin, also having a place on the podium, joined him in winning three 100m medals; one gold, one silver (for this race), and one bronze, which itself made Gatlin the first man in history to win each medal in the 100 meters. Gatlin also became the holder of the record for the longest time between their first medal and last medal in the 100m, in terms of years. His first being his gold won at the 2004 Summer Olympics and his silver medal, 12 years later in this race.

Bolt's winning time of 9.81 seconds was his slowest at the Olympics, but a season's best and the second fastest of the year behind Gatlin. De Grasse' 9.91 was a new personal best, and Meite set a new national record of 9.96 for 6th. The final was significantly slower than London and slightly slower than Beijing, but was still one of the fastest in Olympic history. The race was strikingly similar to Beijing in 2008; the 2nd to 6th athletes finished very closely, with 2nd, 3rd and 4th being won in 9.89, 9.91 and 9.93 respectively, while 7th and 8th finished further behind the field and had a difference of 0.02 between them.

The following evening the medals were presented by Valeriy Borzov, IOC member, Ukraine, and Sebastian Coe, President of the IAAF.

== Qualification ==
A National Olympic Committee (NOC) could enter up to 3 qualified athletes in the men's 100 metres event if all athletes meet the entry standard during the qualifying period. (The limit of 3 has been in place since the 1930 Olympic Congress.) The qualifying standard was 10.16 seconds. The qualifying period was from 1 May 2015 to 11 July 2016. The qualifying time standards could be obtained in various meets during the given period that have the approval of the IAAF. Only outdoor meets were eligible for the sprints and short hurdles, including the 100 metres. NOCs could also use their universality place—each NOC could enter one male athlete regardless of time if they had no male athletes meeting the entry standard for an athletics event—in the 100 metres.

== Competition format ==
The event continued to use the preliminaries plus three main rounds format introduced in 2012. Athletes not meeting the qualification standard competed in the preliminaries; those who met the standard started in the first round.

The preliminary round consisted of 3 heats, each with 7 or 8 athletes. The top two runners in each heat advanced, along with the next two fastest runners overall. They joined the faster entrants in the first round of heats, which consisted of 8 heats of 8 or 9 athletes each. The top two runners in each heat, along with the next eight fastest runners overall, moved on to the semifinals. The 24 semifinalists competed in three heats of 8, with the top two in each semifinal and the next two overall advancing to the eight-man final.

== Records ==
Prior to this competition, the existing global and area records were as follows:

Global records before the 2020 Summer Olympics
Record	Athlete (Nation)	Time (s)	Location	Date
World record	Usain Bolt (JAM)	9.58	Berlin, Germany	16 August 2009
Olympic record	Usain Bolt (JAM)	9.63	London, United Kingdom	5 August 2012
World leading	Justin Gatlin (USA)	9.80	Eugene, Oregon, United States	3 July 2016

Area records before the 2016 Summer Olympics
Area
Area	Time (s)	Wind	Athlete	Nation
Africa (records)	9.85	+1.7	Olusoji Fasuba	Nigeria
Asia (records)	9.91	+1.8	Femi Ogunode	Qatar
Asia (records)	9.91	+0.6	Femi Ogunode	Qatar
Europe (records)	9.86	+0.6	Francis Obikwelu	Portugal
Europe (records)	9.86	+1.3	Jimmy Vicaut	France
Europe (records)	9.86	+1.8	Jimmy Vicaut	France
North, Central America and Caribbean (records)	9.58 WR	+0.9	Usain Bolt	Jamaica
Oceania (records)	9.93	+1.8	Patrick Johnson	Australia
South America (records)	10.00	+1.6	Robson da Silva	Brazil

The following national records were established during the competition:

Country	Athlete	Round	Time (seconds)	Notes
Ivory Coast	Ben Youssef Meïté (CIV)	Semifinals	9.97 s	
Ivory Coast	Ben Youssef Meïté (CIV)	Final	9.96 s	

== Schedule ==
All times are Brasilia Time (UTC-3)

Date	Time	Round
Saturday, 13 August 2016	09:30; 12:00	Preliminaries; Round 1
Sunday, 14 August 2016	21:00; 22:25	Semifinals; Final

== Results ==
=== Preliminaries ===
The preliminary round featured athletes invited to compete who had not achieved the required qualifying standard. Athletes who had achieved the standard received a bye into the first round proper. Qualification rules: First 2 in each heat (Q) and the next 2 fastest (q) advance to Round 1.

==== Preliminary heat 1 ====
Rank	Lane	Athlete	Nation	Reaction	Time	Notes
1	9	Riste Pandev	Macedonia	0.145	10.72	Q, SB
2	8	Sudirman Hadi	Indonesia	0.136	10.77	Q
3	4	Mohammed Abukhousa	Palestine	0.176	10.82	q
4	5	Holder da Silva	Guinea-Bissau	0.165	10.97	
5	6	Wilfried Bingangoye	Gabon	0.145	11.03	
6	2	Mohamed Lamine Dansoko	Guinea	0.145	11.05	
7	7	Abdul Wahab Zahiri	Afghanistan	0.170	11.56	
8	3	Richson Simeon	Marshall Islands	0.136	11.81	SB
				Wind: −0.2 m/s		

==== Preliminary heat 2 ====
Rank	Lane	Athlete	Nation	Reaction	Time	Notes
1	2	Hassan Saaid	Maldives	0.130	10.43	Q
2	6	Siueni Filimone	Tonga	0.155	10.76	Q, SB
3	7	Luke Bezzina	Malta	0.167	11.04	
4	5	Masbah Ahmmed	Bangladesh	0.137	11.34	
5	4	Isaac Silafau	American Samoa	0.141	11.51	
6	8	John Ruuka	Kiribati	0.178	11.65	
7	3	Hermenegildo Leite	Angola	0.145	11.65	
				Wind: +0.4 m/s		

==== Preliminary heat 3 ====
Rank	Lane	Athlete	Nation	Reaction	Time	Notes
1	7	Rodman Teltull	Palau	0.135	10.53	Q
2	6	Jin Wei Timothee Yap	Singapore	0.140	10.84	Q
3	3	Mohamed Fakhri Ismail	Brunei	0.163	10.92	q
4	4	Ishmail Kamara	Sierra Leone	0.146	10.95	
5	5	Kitson Kapiriel	Federated States of Micronesia	0.159	11.42	
6	2	Jidou El Moctar	Mauritania	0.157	11.44	
7	8	Etimoni Timuani	Tuvalu	0.143	11.81	
				Wind: −0.3 m/s		

=== Heats ===
Qualification rules: First 2 in each heat (Q) and the next 8 fastest (q) advance to the Semifinals.

==== Heat 1 ====
Rank	Lane	Athlete	Nation	Reaction	Time	Notes
1	3	Kemarley Brown	Bahrain	0.146	10.13	Q
2	5	Chijindu Ujah	Great Britain	0.150	10.13	Q
3	7	Marvin Bracy	United States	0.155	10.16	q
4	2	Seye Ogunlewe	Nigeria	0.139	10.26	
5	1	Femi Ogunode	Qatar	0.170	10.28	
6	8	Sean Safo-Antwi	Ghana	0.145	10.43	
7	9	Reza Ghasemi	Iran	0.150	10.47	
8	6	Adrian Griffith	Bahamas	0.143	10.53	
9	4	Mohamed Fakhri Ismail	Brunei	0.151	10.95	
				Wind: −1.2 m/s		

==== Heat 2 ====
Rank	Lane	Athlete	Nation	Reaction	Time	Notes
1	8	Justin Gatlin	United States	0.160	10.01	Q
2	7	Daniel Bailey	Antigua and Barbuda	0.153	10.20	Q
3	1	Rondel Sorrillo	Trinidad and Tobago	0.112	10.23	
4	5	Gerald Phiri	Zambia	0.146	10.27	
5	9	Lucas Jakubczyk	Germany	0.166	10.29	
6	6	Ogho-Oghene Egwero	Nigeria	0.151	10.37	
7	3	Wilfried Koffi Hua	Ivory Coast	0.166	10.37	
8	2	Rodman Teltull	Palau	0.133	10.64	
9	4	Riste Pandev	Macedonia	0.163	10.71	SB
				Wind: +0.8 m/s		

==== Heat 3 ====
Rank	Lane	Athlete	Nation	Reaction	Time	Notes
1	5	Xie Zhenye	China	0.143	10.08	Q, PB
2	3	Nickel Ashmeade	Jamaica	0.132	10.13	Q
3	6	Hassan Taftian	Iran	0.150	10.17	q
4	2	Kim Collins	Saint Kitts and Nevis	0.151	10.18	q
5	4	Abdullah Abkar Mohammed	Saudi Arabia	0.154	10.26	
6	7	Aziz Ouhadi	Morocco	0.158	10.34	
7	9	Kemar Hyman	Cayman Islands	0.160	10.34	
8	8	Darrell Wesh	Haiti	0.138	10.39	
				Wind: −0.1 m/s		

==== Heat 4 ====
Rank	Lane	Athlete	Nation	Reaction	Time	Notes
1	3	Andre De Grasse	Canada	0.148	10.04	Q
2	9	Asuka Cambridge	Japan	0.137	10.13	Q
3	2	Su Bingtian	China	0.146	10.17	q
4	1	Jimmy Vicaut	France	0.164	10.19	q
5	7	Churandy Martina	Netherlands	0.142	10.22	
6	5	Emmanuel Matadi	Liberia	0.146	10.31	
7	8	Julian Reus	Germany	0.135	10.34	
8	6	Jamial Rolle	Bahamas	0.145	10.68	
9	4	Sudirman Hadi	Indonesia	0.122	10.70	
				Wind: −0.5 m/s		

==== Heat 5 ====
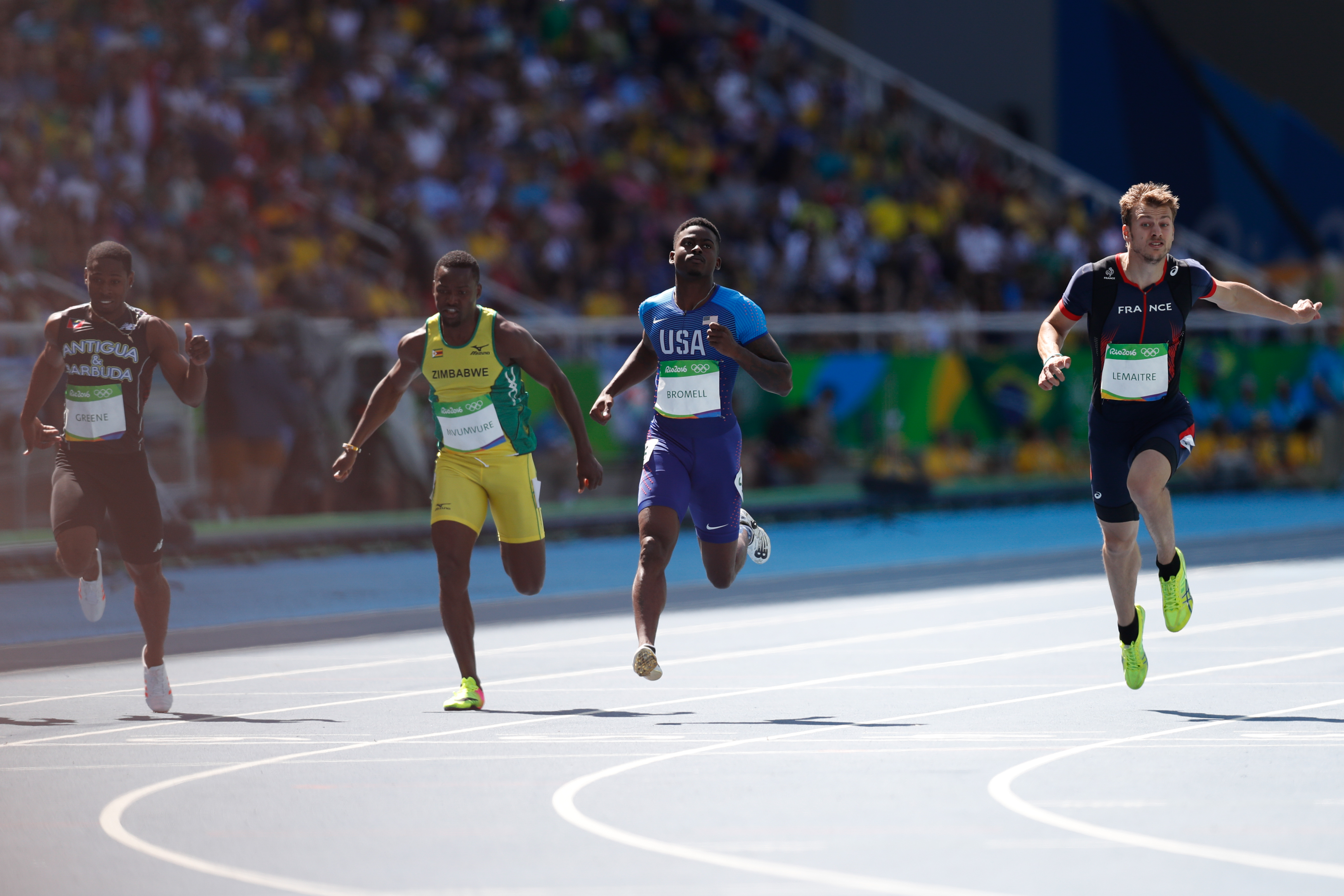
Heat 5 finish

Rank	Lane	Athlete	Nation	Reaction	Time	Notes
1	9	Ben Youssef Meïté	Ivory Coast	0.145	10.03	Q
2	5	Trayvon Bromell	United States	0.165	10.13	Q
3	4	Christophe Lemaitre	France	0.150	10.16	q
4	7	Cejhae Greene	Antigua and Barbuda	0.156	10.20	q
5	8	Keston Bledman	Trinidad and Tobago	0.150	10.20	
6	1	Akeem Haynes	Canada	0.123	10.22	
7	6	Gabriel Mvumvure	Zimbabwe	0.131	10.28	
8	2	Hassan Saaid	Maldives	0.135	10.47	
–	3	Siueni Filimone	Tonga	—N/a	DNS	
				Wind: +0.2 m/s		

==== Heat 6 ====
Rank	Lane	Athlete	Nation	Reaction	Time	Notes
1	4	Yohan Blake	Jamaica	0.154	10.11	Q
2	8	Jak Ali Harvey	Turkey	0.159	10.14	Q
3	9	Barakat Alharthi	Oman	0.155	10.22	
4	2	Mosito Lehata	Lesotho	0.151	10.25	
5	6	James Ellington	Great Britain	0.145	10.29	
6	3	Henricho Bruintjies	South Africa	0.107	10.33	
7	5	Zhang Peimeng	China	0.121	10.36	
8	7	Antoine Adams	Saint Kitts and Nevis	0.149	10.39	
				Wind: −0.8 m/s		

==== Heat 7 ====
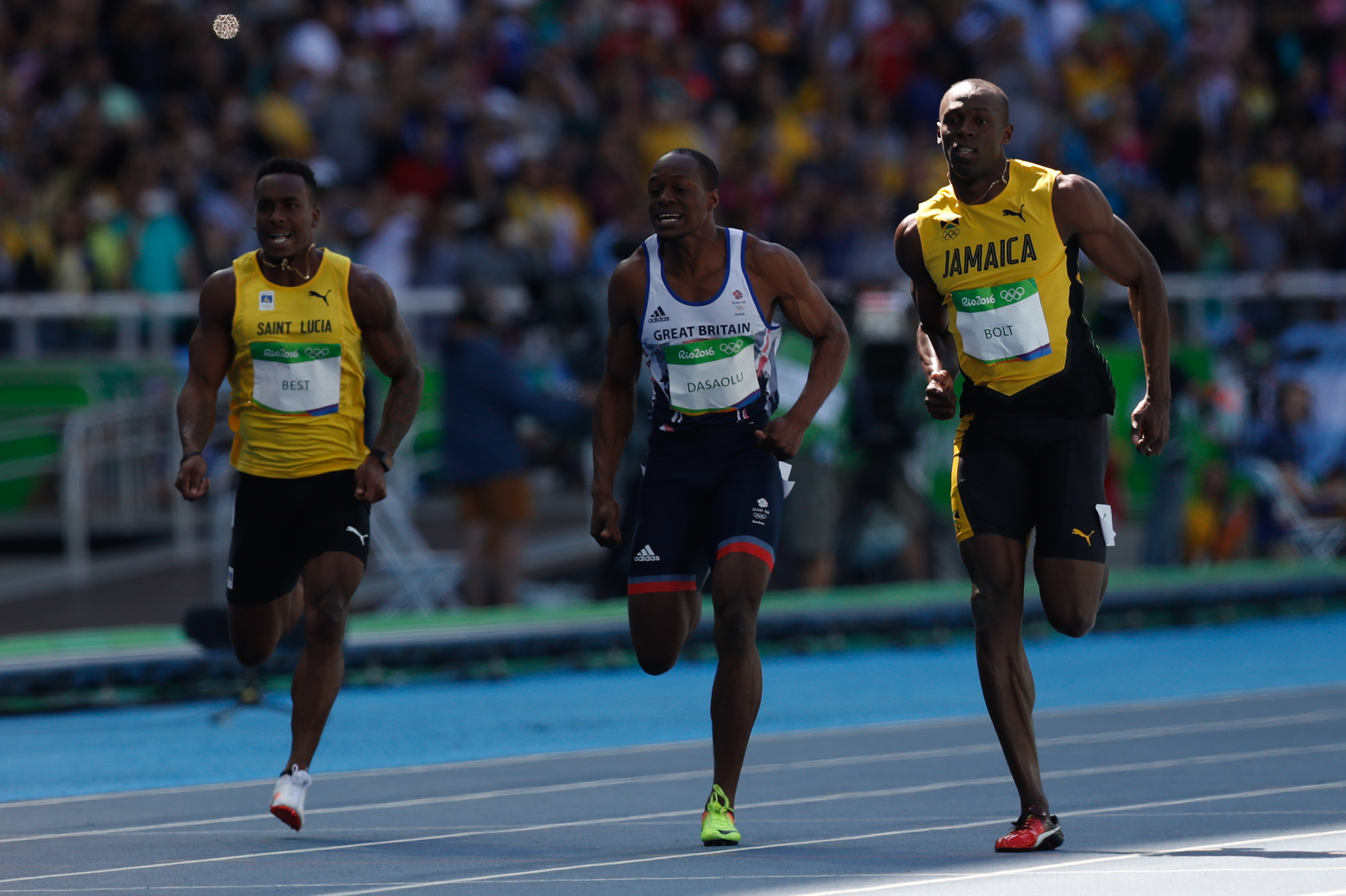
Heat 7 finish

Finished	Lane	Athlete	Nation	Reaction	Time	Notes
1	6	Usain Bolt	Jamaica	0.156	10.07	Q
2	3	Andrew Fisher	Bahrain	0.134	10.12	Q
3	7	James Dasaolu	Great Britain	0.171	10.18	q
4	9	Yoshihide Kiryu	Japan	0.150	10.23	
5	2	Shavez Hart	Bahamas	0.139	10.28	SB
6	5	Richard Thompson	Trinidad and Tobago	0.130	10.29	
7	8	Jahvid Best	Saint Lucia	0.147	10.39	
8	1	Jurgen Themen	Suriname	0.139	10.47	
9	4	Jin Wei Timothee Yap	Singapore	0.149	10.79	
				Wind: −0.4 m/s		

==== Heat 8 ====
Rank	Lane	Athlete	Nation	Reaction	Time	Notes
1	4	Akani Simbine	South Africa	0.124	10.14	Q
2	1	Ryota Yamagata	Japan	0.111	10.20	Q
3	7	Aaron Brown	Canada	0.135	10.24	
4	9	Ramon Gittens	Barbados	0.162	10.25	
5	2	Solomon Bockarie	Netherlands	0.127	10.36	
5	5	Vitor Hugo dos Santos	Brazil	0.157	10.36	
7	6	Kim Kuk-young	South Korea	0.135	10.37	
8	3	Brijesh Lawrence	Saint Kitts and Nevis	0.163	10.55	
9	8	Mohammed Abukhousa	Palestine	0.153	11.89	
				Wind: −1.3 m/s		

=== Semifinals ===
Qualification Rules: First 2 in each heat (Q) and the next 2 fastest (q) advance to the Final.

==== Semifinal 1 ====
Rank	Lane	Athlete	Nation	Reaction	Time	Notes
1	3	Jimmy Vicaut	France	0.131	9.95	Q
2	7	Ben Youssef Meïté	Ivory Coast	0.142	9.97	Q, NR
3	5	Akani Simbine	South Africa	0.144	9.98	q
4	9	Jak Ali Harvey	Turkey	0.148	10.03	
5	4	Nickel Ashmeade	Jamaica	0.118	10.05	
6	8	Marvin Bracy	United States	0.152	10.08	
7	6	Xie Zhenye	China	0.134	10.11	
8	2	Hassan Taftian	Iran	0.136	10.23	
				Wind: +0.2 m/s		

==== Semifinal 2 ====
Rank	Lane	Athlete	Nation	Reaction	Time	Notes
1	6	Usain Bolt	Jamaica	0.143	9.86	Q, SB
2	5	Andre De Grasse	Canada	0.130	9.92	Q, PB
3	9	Trayvon Bromell	United States	0.128	10.01	q
4	7	Chijindu Ujah	Great Britain	0.160	10.01	
5	8	Ryota Yamagata	Japan	0.109	10.05	PB
6	3	Kim Collins	Saint Kitts and Nevis	0.138	10.12	
7	2	Cejhae Greene	Antigua and Barbuda	0.143	10.13	
–	4	Andrew Fisher	Bahrain	—N/a	DQ	R162.7
				Wind: +0.2 m/s		

==== Semifinal 3 ====
Rank	Lane	Athlete	Nation	Reaction	Time	Notes
1	6	Justin Gatlin	United States	0.151	9.94	Q
2	4	Yohan Blake	Jamaica	0.147	10.01	Q
3	9	Christophe Lemaitre	France	0.122	10.07	SB
4	3	Su Bingtian	China	0.140	10.08	SB
5	5	Kemarley Brown	Bahrain	0.152	10.13	
6	2	James Dasaolu	Great Britain	0.145	10.16	
7	7	Asuka Cambridge	Japan	0.135	10.17	
–	8	Daniel Bailey	Antigua and Barbuda	—N/a	DNS	
				Wind: 0.0 m/s		

=== Final ===
Rank	Lane	Athlete	Nation	Reaction	Time	Notes
1st place, gold medalist(s)	6	Usain Bolt	Jamaica	0.155	9.81	SB
2nd place, silver medalist(s)	4	Justin Gatlin	United States	0.152	9.89	
3rd place, bronze medalist(s)	7	Andre De Grasse	Canada	0.141	9.91	PB
4	9	Yohan Blake	Jamaica	0.145	9.93	SB
5	3	Akani Simbine	South Africa	0.128	9.94	
6	8	Ben Youssef Meïté	Ivory Coast	0.156	9.96	NR
7	5	Jimmy Vicaut	France	0.140	10.04	
8	2	Trayvon Bromell	United States	0.135	10.06	
				Wind: +0.2 m/s		
