= Howard Lindsay (athlete) =

Antiguan and Barbudan Runner (born 1963)

Howard Andrew Lindsay (born August 14, 1963, in Jamaica) is an Antiguan and Barbudan runner. He competed as a 4 x 400 metres runner at the 1984, 1988 and 1996 Olympic Games. He also competed in the 4 x 100 metres relay and 200 metres at the 1988 Olympics. His personal best is 45.7 seconds for the 400 metres. He currently coaches middle school, and high school athletes at United Nations International School (UNIS) in Manhattan, New York, and he runs in masters competitions such as the World Masters Athletics Championships.
