= Hermenegildo Leite =

Angolan sprinter (born 2000)

Hermenegildo Leite (born May 17, 2000, in Luanda) is an Angolan sprinter. He competed at the 2016 Summer Olympics in the men's 100 metres race, being 16 years old and the youngest competitor in the Angolan team. His time of 11.65 seconds in the preliminary round did not qualify him for the first round.

== International competitions ==
Year	Competition	Venue	Position	Event	Notes
Representing Angola
2016	Olympic Games	Rio de Janeiro, Brazil	(h)	100 m	11.65
