= Robert Peters (cyclist) =

Antiguan cyclist

Personal information
- Born: 15 November 1970 (age 55)

Cycling career
- Sport: Cycling

Robert Peters (born 15 November 1970) is an Antiguan former cyclist. He competed in two events at the 1992 Summer Olympics.
