= Heidi Lehrer =

Antigua and Barbuda sprint canoer

Heidi Anne Lehrer (born March 4, 1966) is a sprint canoer from Antigua and Barbuda who competed in the mid-1990s. At the 1996 Summer Olympics in Atlanta, she advanced to the repechages of the K-1 500 m event, but did not compete.
