= Mitchell Browne =

Antigua and Barbuda sprinter

Personal information
- Nationality: Antigua and Barbuda
- Born: 1 June 1966 (age 60)

Sport
- Sport: Sprinting
- Event: 4 × 400 metres relay

Mitchell Patrick Browne (born 1 June 1966) is an Antigua and Barbuda sprinter. He competed in the men's 4 × 400 metres relay at the 1996 Summer Olympics.
