= Karin O'Reilly Clashing =

Antiguan swimmer

Personal information
- Born: 1992 (age 33–34) San José, Costa Rica

Sport
- Sport: Swimming

Karin Alejandra O'Reilly Clashing (born 1992) is an Antiguan swimmer. She competed in the women's 50m freestyle at the 2012 Summer Olympics in London, finishing with a time of 30.02 seconds winning her heat, but did not qualify for the next round as she came in 55th place overall. Her mother, Edith O'Reilly Clashing, is her coach. She is a founding member of the Wadadli Aquatic Racers Swim Club. Her sister, Christal, competed in the 2004 Olympics in Athens, swimming the 50m freestyle as well.
