= Michael Terry (athlete) =

Michael Terry (born June 5, 1973) is a former middle-distance runner who competed in the 1996 Atlanta Summer Olympics for Antigua and Barbuda.

Terry competed for the UCLA track and field team from 1992 to 1996. During those years, he was a contributing member of UCLA's four consecutive Pac-10 Conference championship teams. Terry was an individual Pac-10 Conference champion competing in the 800 meters (1996). He was also a member of the Pac-10 Conference championship 4x400 meter relay team (1993).

Terry was awarded the 1996 Pac-10 Conference Medal Award, which is awarded annually to each member institution's outstanding senior male and female student-athlete based on the exhibition of the greatest combination of performance and achievement in scholarship, athletics and leadership. Terry graduated in 1996, magna cum laude with a bachelor's degree in business economics. He was awarded the distinction of Academic All-American (3rd Team) in 1996. Terry was a member of the Phi Beta Kappa honor society.

Terry attended El Modena High School in Orange, California, where he was a three-sport athlete (cross country, basketball and track). He was a three-time California Interscholastic Federation (CIF) Southern Section champion in the 800 meters. As a junior, he qualified for the CIF State Track and Field Championship finals in the 800 meters (1990). As a senior, he led Orange County high-school basketball players in assists per game, and was awarded his league's MVP award. He also returned to the CIF State Track and Field Championship finals, where he won the 800 meter event in 1991.
