= Brendan Christian =

Antigua and Barbuda sprinter (born 1983)

Personal information
- Nationality: Antigua and Barbuda
- Born: 11 December 1983 (age 42)
- Height: 1.78 m (5 ft 10 in)
- Weight: 70 kg (154 lb)

Sport
- Sport: Running
- Event: Sprints

Achievements and titles
- Personal bests: 100m: 10.09 200m: 20.12 400m: 47.14
Medal record
Men's Athletics
Representing Antigua and Barbuda
Pan American Games
Gold medal – first place	2007 Rio de Janeiro	200 m
Bronze medal – third place	2007 Rio de Janeiro	100 m
World Junior Championships
Silver medal – second place	2002 Kingston	200 m

Brendan Kyle Akeem Christian (born 11 December 1983) is a sprinter from Antigua and Barbuda who specializes in the 200 metres. Born in Antigua, he is the son of Donald Christian who competed in the 1976 Summer Olympics in Montreal as a cyclist. His personal best 100 metres time is 10.09 seconds, achieved in June 2009 in Nivelles. He is also a holder of the Antiguan and Barbudan record in 4 x 100 metres relay with 39.90 seconds.

As a junior, he won the silver medal in this event at the 2002 World Junior Championships, where he also finished sixth in the 100 metres race. He then competed at the 2004 Summer Olympics, reaching the quarter-final, and the 2006 Commonwealth Games where he reached the semi-final.

Christian competed for the Texas Longhorns track and field team in the NCAA.

In 2007 he won the 100 metres bronze medal and the 200 metres gold medal at the Pan American Games. Shortly after, at the 2007 World Championships, he reached the semi-finals in both events. There, he set a national record in the 200 metres of 20.23 seconds.

Christian represented Antigua and Barbuda at the 2008 Summer Olympics in Beijing. He competed at the 200 metres and placed second in his first round heat after Aaron Armstrong in a time of 20.58 seconds. He improved his time in the second round to 20.26 seconds and won his race in front of Churandy Martina and Kristof Beyens. He ran his semi final race in 20.29 seconds and placed fifth, failing to achieve a spot in the Olympic final.

At the 2012 Summer Olympics, he again reached the semi-finals, but again placed fifth, missing out on a place in the final.
