= Fred Sowerby =

Personal information
- Nationality: Antiguan
- Born: 11 December 1948 (age 77) Plymouth, Montserrat

Sport
- Sport: Sprinting
- Event: 400 metres
Medal record
Representing Americas
IAAF World Cup
| Bronze medal – third place | 1977 Düsseldorf | 4 x 400 m relay |

Fred Sowerby (Frederick Oliver Newgent Sowerby; born December 11, 1948) is a track and field athlete from Antigua and Barbuda, known primarily for running the 400 metres.

== Biography ==
At the 1976 Summer Olympics, he was eliminated by finishing seventh in the quarterfinals while running more than two seconds slower than his personal best of 45.6, set earlier that year. He also anchored his team, finishing last in their qualifying round. Sowerby still holds the Antiguan and Barbudan national records in the 400 metres, and 400 metres hurdles. Sowerby became the first ever flag bearer for Antigua and Barbuda when he carried the flag in the 1976 opening ceremony.

Sowerby is also a three-time champion in the now defunct 600 yard dash at the USA Indoor Track and Field Championships. Sowerby is a 1973 graduate of Murray State University, where he was elected to the Athletic Hall of Fame in 1986.

Sowerby, had a successful career as head track and field coach of Delaware State University, receiving several Coach of the year awards. He then relocated to his alma mater, Murray State University, where he coached the track teams to several victories until 1993.

After moving to Las Vegas, Nevada, where he was an assistant coach for the University of Nevada, Las Vegas, Sowerby has continued to run in Masters athletics wearing the United States uniform, setting the World Masters Athletics World Record in the M45 and M50 age divisions in 1994 and 1999 respectively. Sowerby also still holds the World M45 Record for the Indoor 400, set in 1994.

Sowerby currently is retired from collegiate athletics although he coaches track and is a substitute teacher at Hopkinsville High School and lives in Hopkinsville, Kentucky with his wife, Carolyn. He has six children: Brian, Vaedra, Fred, Jr., LaTonya, Terrance, and Stephon.
