= Paul Richards (athlete) =

Antigua and Barbuda sprinter

Personal information
- Nationality: Antigua and Barbuda
- Born: 16 February 1956 (age 70)

Sport
- Sport: Sprinting
- Event: 4 × 100 metres relay

Paul Richards (born 16 February 1956) is an Antigua and Barbuda sprinter. He competed in the men's 4 × 100 metres relay at the 1976 Summer Olympics.
