= Kareem Valentine =

Antiguan swimmer (born 1992)

Personal information
- Full name: Kareem Javier Valentine Sandoval
- Born: October 11, 1992 (age 34)

Sport
- Sport: Swimming

Kareem Javier Valentine Sandoval (born 11 October 1992) is an Antiguan swimmer. He competed at the 2008 Summer Olympics.
