= Jacob Lehrer =

Antigua and Barbuda sprint canoer (born 1964)

Jacob D. Lehrer (born January 3, 1964) is a sprint canoer from Antigua and Barbuda who competed in the mid-1990s. At the 1996 Summer Olympics, he advanced to the semifinals of the C-2 1000 m event, but did not compete.
