= Charmaine Thomas =

Antigua and Barbuda sprinter

Personal information
- Nationality: Antigua and Barbuda
- Born: 25 August 1974 (age 52)

Sport
- Sport: Sprinting
- Event: 4 × 100 metres relay

Charmaine Thomas (born 25 August 1974) is an Antigua and Barbuda sprinter. She competed in the women's 4 × 100 metres relay at the 1996 Summer Olympics.
