= Barbara Selkridge =

Antigua and Barbuda sprinter

Personal information
- Full name: Barbara A. Selkridge
- Nationality: Antigua and Barbuda
- Born: 7 June 1971 (age 54)
- Height: 1.75 m (5 ft 9 in)
- Weight: 59 kg (130 lb)

Sport
- Sport: Sprinting
- Event: 400 metres

Barbara A. Selkridge (later Abbey; born 7 June 1971) is an Antigua and Barbuda sprinter. She competed in the women's 400 metres at the 1988 Summer Olympics.

Selkridge competed for the Texas Longhorns track and field team in the NCAA.

Her brother, Oral Selkridge, was also a sprinter.
