= Samantha Roberts =

Antiguan swimmer (born 2000)

Personal information
- Nationality: Antiguan
- Born: 21 April 2000 (age 26) Memphis, Tennessee, U.S.
- Height: 172 cm (5 ft 8 in)
- Weight: 64 kg (141 lb)

Sport
- Sport: Swimming
- College team: University of Western Ontario

Samantha Roberts (born 21 April 2000) is an Antiguan swimmer. She competed in the women's 50 metre freestyle event at the 2016 Summer Olympics, where she ranked 57th with a time of 27.95 seconds. She did not advance to the semifinals. She was the youngest member of Antigua and Barbuda's 2016 Olympic team.

She competed in the women's 50 metre freestyle event at the 2020 Summer Olympics.

Olympic Games
Preceded by Daniel Bailey	Flag bearer for Antigua and Barbuda; Tokyo 2020 with Cejhae Greene	Succeeded by Cejhae Greene; Joella Lloyd
