= Neil Lloyd =

Antiguan cyclist

Personal information
- Born: 1 October 1966 (age 60)

Cycling career
- Sport: Cycling

Nigel “Neil” Lloyd (born 1 October 1966) is an Antiguan former cyclist. He competed at the 1988 Summer Olympics and the 1992 Summer Olympics.
