= Oral Selkridge =

Antigua and Barbuda sprinter

- Born: August 20, 1962 (age 58); Antigua and Barbuda
- Education: The City College of New York; New York University
- Occupation: Architect

Oral Selkridge
Personal information
- Nationality: Antigua and Barbuda
- Born: 20 August 1962 (age 64)
- Height: 1.80 m (5 ft 11 in)
- Weight: 70 kg (154 lb)

Sport
- Sport: Sprinting
- Event: 4 × 400 metres relay

Oral Armstrong Lincoln Selkridge, RA, LEED AP (born 20 August 1962) is a former sprinter from Antigua and Barbuda. He competed in the men's 4 × 400 metres relay at the 1988 Summer Olympics. Selkridge now works as an architect in New York City.

His sister, Barbara Selkridge, was also a sprinter.
