= Jocelyn Joseph =

Antigua and Barbuda sprinter

Personal information
- Nationality: Antigua and Barbuda
- Born: 11 February 1964 (age 61)

Sport
- Sport: Sprinting
- Event: 200 metres

Jocelyn Joseph (born 11 February 1964) is an Antigua and Barbuda sprinter. She competed in the women's 200 metres at the 1988 Summer Olympics.
