= Joella Lloyd =

Antiguan athlete (born 2002)

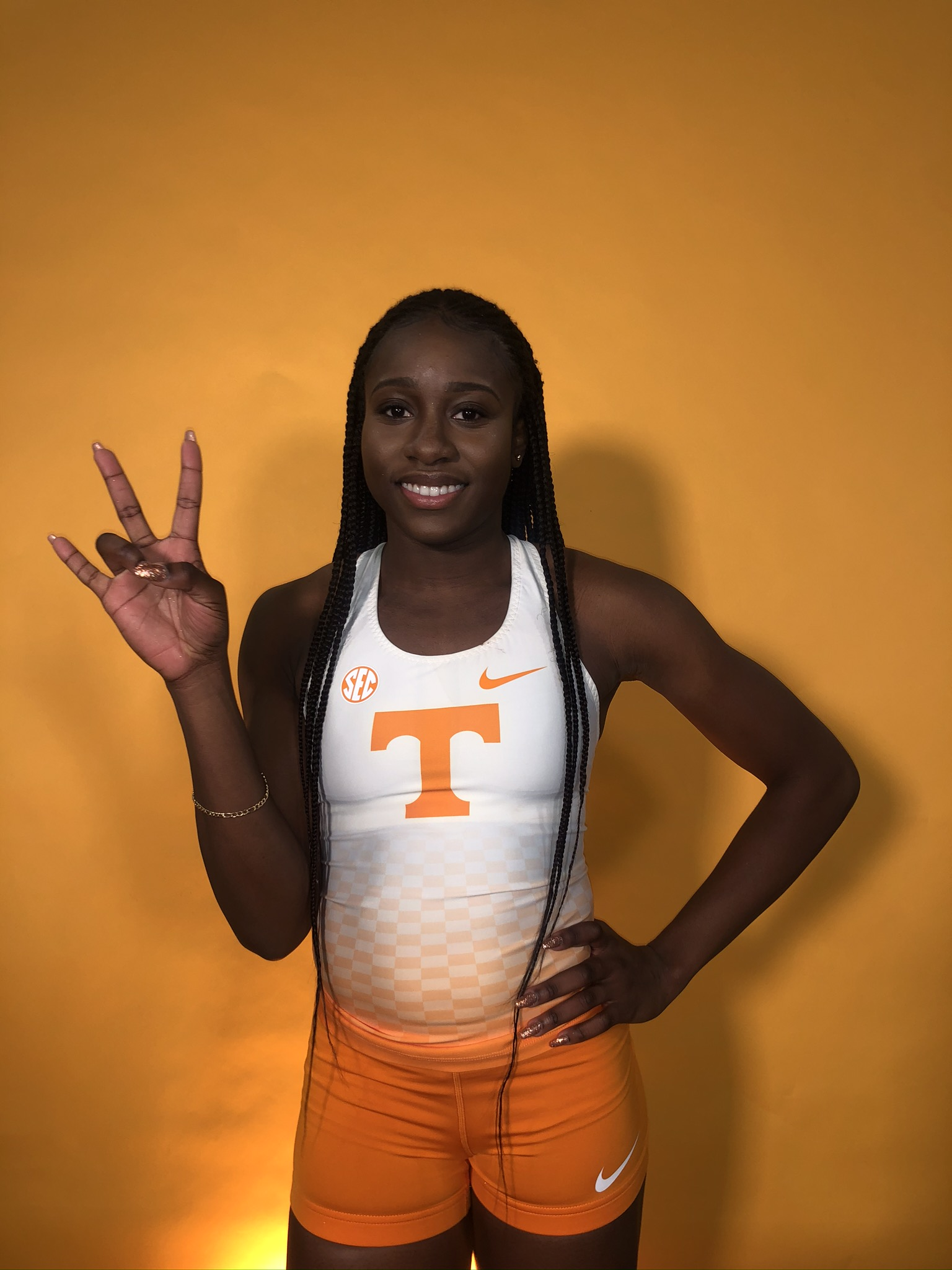
- Lloyd in 2020

Personal information
- Born: 12 April 2002 (age 24) St. John's, Antigua and Barbuda
- Height: 1.72 m (5 ft 8 in) (2024)

Sport
- Sport: Track and field
- Events: 60m, 100 m, 200 m

Achievements and titles
- Personal bests: 60 meters: 7.13 (2025) NR; 100 meters: 11.01 (2025) NR; 200 meters: 22.66 (2022) NR; 400 meters: 57.38 (2017)
Medal record
Women's athletics
Representing Antigua and Barbuda
NACAC U20 Championships
Silver medal – second place	2021 San José	200 m
Bronze medal – third place	2021 San José	100 m

Joella Lloyd (born 12 April 2002) is an athlete from Antigua and Barbuda who holds the national record in the 60 metres, 100 metres and 200 metres sprint events, and competed at the 2020 and 2024 Olympic Games.

== Biography ==
From St. John's in Antigua and Barbuda, Lloyd attended Antigua Girls' High School, later studying at the University of Tennessee in the United States.

Lloyd produced a personal best of 23.39 seconds in the 200 metres at the SEC Indoor Championships, placing ninth overall, in February 2021 competing for the Tennessee Volunteers. On 27 February, Lloyd won the indoor 60 metres conference title at the SEC Indoor Championships, tying the all-time Tennessee program record with a time of 7.15 seconds and recording the No. 1 mark in the world by any female athlete under 20 years old. It was also the first win for a Lady Vol in an indoor 60m SEC championships since 2008. Lloyd finished sixth at her NCAA indoor nationals debut on 13 March 2021, posting a time of 7.23 in the 60 metres.

Lloyd set a new Antigua and Barbuda national record in the 100 meters in May 2021, running 11.19 for first place at the Tennessee Challenge in Knoxville. It was also the World U-20 leading time for 2021, beating the USA's Tionna Brown and her 11.29 run. She won the 100 m bronze and 200 m silver medal in the 2021 NACAC U20 Championships.

Selected for the 100 metres in the delayed 2020 Summer Olympics, Lloyd won her preliminary heat in 11.55 seconds before running 11.54 in the first round, finishing 7th in the heat.

In May 2022, Lloyd added the national 200 metres record to her 100m record when she ran 23.09 at the SEC championships. Lloyd lowered this again at the NCAA championship semi-finals in June, running 22.66 for the 200 metres. At the 2022 World Athletics Championships Lloyd qualified from the heats to the semi-finals, again running below 23 seconds.

In May 2024, Lloyd ran a new national record for the 100 metres at the NCAA East Championships of 11.06 seconds. She competed in the 100 metres at the 2024 Paris Olympics. In February 2025, lowered her national indoor 60 metres record to 7.13 seconds. The following month, she reached the semi-finals of the 60 metres at the 2025 World Athletics Indoor Championships in Nanjing, China, running 7.21 seconds in her heat and 7.25 to place fourth in her semi-final. That summer, following a graduate transfer to Florida State University, Lloyd set a new national record in the 100 metres with time of 11.01 seconds at the NCAA East Regional Championships.

Olympic Games
Preceded by Cejhae Greene; Samantha Roberts	Flag bearer for Antigua and Barbuda; Paris 2024 with Cejhae Greene	Succeeded by Incumbent
