= Karl James =

Antigua and Barbuda sailor

Personal information
- Nationality: Antigua and Barbuda
- Born: 30 March 1967 (age 58)

Sport
- Sport: Sailing

Karl James MBE (born 30 March 1967) is an Antigua and Barbuda sailor. He competed at the 1996 Summer Olympics and the 2000 Summer Olympics.

He was appointed MBE in the 2020 New Year Honours.
