= Daniel Bailey =

Antiguan sprinter

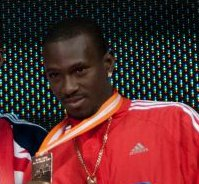

Personal information
- Full name: Daniel Bailey
- Nationality: Antigua and Barbuda
- Born: 9 September 1986 (age 40) Antigua and Barbuda
- Height: 1.79 m (5 ft 10 in)
- Weight: 68 kg (150 lb)

Sport
- Sport: Athletics

Achievements and titles
- Personal bests: 100 m: 9.91; 200 m: 20.40
- Updated on 20 January 2015

Daniel Bakka Everton Bailey (born 9 September 1986) is a sprinter from Antigua and Barbuda who specializes in the 100m.

== Career ==
Bailey represented Antigua and Barbuda at the 2004 Summer Olympics, the 2006 Commonwealth Games, the 2008 Summer Olympics, the 2012 Summer Olympics and the 2014 Commonwealth Games.

Bailey took up running at the age of 11, but preferring cricket and football, he only became a serious athlete at the age of 16.

In Beijing at the 2008 Olympics, he competed in the 100 metres sprint and placed second in his heat, just four-hundredths of a second after Usain Bolt in a time of 10.24 seconds. He qualified for the second round, in which he improved his time to 10.23 seconds. However, he was unable to qualify for the semifinals as he finished in fourth place after Asafa Powell, Walter Dix, and Derrick Atkins.

Bailey made a strong start to the 2009 athletics season, recording a personal best of 10.02 seconds and a windy 9.93 seconds in the 100 m in early May. He broke new ground at the South American Grande Prêmio Brasil Caixa meet, becoming the first athlete to run under ten seconds on the continent. His run of 9.99 seconds (achieved despite a headwind) was a new personal best. He again lowered this mark to 9.96 seconds in Rome at the Golden Gala meet and a week later in Paris ran 9.91 seconds, to finish second to his training partner Usain Bolt, setting a new national record for Antigua and Barbuda. He was the first Antiguan athlete to qualify for the finals of the men's 100-metre at that year's World Championships.

He won the bronze medal in the 60 metres at the 2010 IAAF World Indoor Championships. Finishing in 6.57 seconds, he became Antigua's first ever medallist in the event and said he hoped the medal win would bode well for the summer. He competed on the 2010 IAAF Diamond League circuit, taking third over 100 m at the British Grand Prix and Adidas Grand Prix (running a wind-assisted 9.92 seconds at the latter meet). He was fourth at the Memorial van Damme and had a season's best of 10 seconds flat at the Meeting Areva in Paris, where he was also fourth. His major competition performances that year were at the 2010 CAC Games, where he was the 100 m silver medallist behind Churandy Martina, and the 2010 IAAF Continental Cup, where he was also runner-up against Christophe Lemaitre. He also led off the winning Americas relay team at the Continental Cup.

Missing the 2011 indoor season, he opened the year in Jamaica and achieved a personal best over 200 metres with a run of 20.51 sec at the UTech Classic in April. A wind-assisted run of 9.94 sec in the 100 m followed at the Jamaica Invitational. He headed to Europe with his training partner Yohan Blake (another trainee of Glen Mills), and his trip was highlighted by a win in 9.97 seconds in Strasbourg. The 24-year-old saw his time in Europe as a way of accustoming himself to competing abroad: "Here I learned how to acclimatise and cope with different eating habits".

He was Antigua and Barbuda's flag bearer at the 2012 Summer Olympics but did not qualify from his heat.

At the 2014 Commonwealth Games, he was the flag bearer for Antigua and Barbuda.

He again competed at the 2016 Summer Olympics in Rio de Janeiro. During the 100 m event, he finished 2nd in his heat and qualified for the semifinals but did not start. He was again the flag bearer during the Parade of Nations.

== Personal bests ==
Event	Time (seconds)	Venue	Date
60 metres	6.54	Birmingham, United Kingdom	21 February 2009
100 metres	9.91 (wind: -0.2 m/s)	Paris, France	17 July 2009
200 metres	20.40 (wind: +0.6 m/s)	Mexico City, Mexico	16 August 2014

- All information taken from IAAF profile.

== International competitions ==
Year	Competition	Venue	Position	Event	Notes
Representing Antigua and Barbuda
2002	Leeward Islands Junior Championships (U17)	Road Town, Tortola, British Virgin Islands	3rd	100m	11.2 (ht) (wind: NWI)
2002	Leeward Islands Junior Championships (U17)	Road Town, Tortola, British Virgin Islands	4th	200m	23.98 (wind: NWI)
2002	Leeward Islands Junior Championships (U17)	Road Town, Tortola, British Virgin Islands	4th	Long jump	6.10 m (wind: NWI)
2002	Central American and Caribbean; Junior Championships (U-17)	Bridgetown, Barbados	7th	100 m	11.39 (wind: 0.3 m/s)
2002	Central American and Caribbean; Junior Championships (U-17)	Bridgetown, Barbados	5th (h)	200 m	23.09 (wind: −0.5 m/s)
2003	CARIFTA Games (U-20)	Port of Spain, Trinidad and Tobago	4th (h)	100 m	10.97 (wind: −3.3 m/s)
2003	CARIFTA Games (U-20)	Port of Spain, Trinidad and Tobago	2nd	200 m	21.10 (wind: −1.1 m/s)
2003	Leeward Islands Junior Championships (U20)	Road Town, Tortola, British Virgin Islands	1st	100 m	10.62 (wind: NWI)
2003	Leeward Islands Junior Championships (U20)	Road Town, Tortola, British Virgin Islands	1st	200m	22.29 (wind: NWI)
2003	Pan American Junior Championships	Bridgetown, Barbados	6th	100m	10.57 (wind: 0.0 m/s)
2003	Pan American Junior Championships	Bridgetown, Barbados	2nd (h)	200m	21.26 (wind: +0.1 m/s)
2003	World Youth Championships	Sherbrooke, Canada	12th (sf)	100 m	10.80 (wind: -2.6 m/s)
2003	World Youth Championships	Sherbrooke, Canada	4th	200 m	21.59 (wind: -1.1 m/s)
2003	Pan American Games	Santo Domingo, Dominican Republic	14th (sf)	100 m	10.74 (wind: -1.7 m/s)
2003	Pan American Games	Santo Domingo, Dominican Republic	14th (sf)	200 m	21.36 (wind: +0.3 m/s)
2004	CARIFTA Games (U-20)	Hamilton, Bermuda	1st	100 m	10.54 (wind: −0.9 m/s)
2004	CARIFTA Games (U-20)	Hamilton, Bermuda	2nd	200 m	21.07 (wind: +1.4 m/s)
2004	Central American and Caribbean; Junior Championships (U-20)	Coatzacoalcos, Mexico	1st	100 m	10.33 (wind: +1.6 m/s)
2004	Central American and Caribbean; Junior Championships (U-20)	Coatzacoalcos, Mexico	2nd	200 m	20.81 (wind: +1.2 m/s)
2004	World Junior Championships	Grosseto, Italy	4th	100 m	10.39 (wind: +1.0 m/s)
2004	Olympic Games	Athens, Greece	6th (heats)	100 m	10.51 (wind: -1.4 m/s)
2005	CARIFTA Games (U-20)	Bacolet, Trinidad and Tobago	1st	100 m	10.36 (wind: +1.7 m/s)
2005	CARIFTA Games (U-20)	Bacolet, Trinidad and Tobago	1st	200 m	21.36 (wind: −0.9 m/s)
2005	Leeward Islands Junior Championships (U20)	St. John's, Antigua and Barbuda	1st	100m	10.77 (wind: NWI)
2005	Leeward Islands Junior Championships (U20)	St. John's, Antigua and Barbuda	1st	200m	21.54 (wind: NWI)
2005	Leeward Islands Junior Championships (U20)	St. John's, Antigua and Barbuda	4th	Javelin	44.26 m
2005	Central American and Caribbean Championships	Nassau, Bahamas	5th (sf)^{1}	100m	10.39 (wind: +0.5 m/s)
2005	Pan American Junior Championships	Windsor, Canada	4th	100m	10.39 (wind: +0.7 m/s)
2005	Pan American Junior Championships	Windsor, Canada	3rd	200 m	20.80 w (wind: +2.5 m/s)
2005	World Championships	Helsinki, Finland	4th (heats)	100 m	10.49 (wind: -1.4 m/s)
2006	Commonwealth Games	Melbourne, Australia	11th (quarter-finals)	100 m	10.38 (wind: +1.8 m/s)
2006	Commonwealth Games	Melbourne, Australia	5th	4 × 100 m relay	40.76
2006	NACAC U-23 Championships	Santo Domingo, Dominican Republic	7th	100m	10.64 (wind: +1.2 m/s)
2006	CAC Games	Cartagena, Colombia	5th (heats)	100 m	10.7 (ht) (wind: NWI)
2006	CAC Games	Cartagena, Colombia	—	4 × 100 m relay	DNF
2007	Pan American Games	Rio de Janeiro, Brazil	7th (h)^{2}	100 m	10.34 (wind: +0.6 m/s)
2008	World Indoor Championships	Valencia, Spain	—	60 m	DQ
2008	CAC Championships	Cali, Colombia	2nd	100 m	10.18
2008	Olympic Games	Beijing, China	20th (qf)	100 m	10.23 (wind: -0.1 m/s)
2009	World Championships	Berlin, Germany	4th	100 m	9.93 (wind: +0.9 m/s)
2010	World Indoor Championships	Doha, Qatar	3rd	60 m	6.57
2010	CAC Games	Mayagüez, Puerto Rico	2nd	100 m	10.08
2010	Continental Cup	Split, Croatia	2nd	100 m	10.05 (wind: +0.7 m/s)
2011	CAC Championships	Mayagüez, Puerto Rico	2nd	100 m	10.11
2011	World Championships	Daegu, South Korea	5th	100 m	10.26 (wind: -1.4 m/s)
2012	Olympic Games	London, United Kingdom	18th (sf)	100m	10.16 (wind: +1.0 m/s)
2013	World Championships	Moscow, Russia	40th	100 m	10.45 (wind: -0.4 m/s)
2014	Commonwealth Games	Glasgow, United Kingdom	5th (sf)	100m	10.22 (wind: -0.5 m/s)
2014	Commonwealth Games	Glasgow, United Kingdom	6th	200m	20.43 (wind: +0.5 m/s)
2014	Commonwealth Games	Glasgow, United Kingdom	7th	4 × 100 m relay	40.45
2014	Pan American Sports Festival	Mexico City, Mexico	2nd	100m	10.10 A (wind: -1.3 m/s)
2014	Pan American Sports Festival	Mexico City, Mexico	5th	200m	20.40 A (wind: +0.6 m/s)
2015	World Championships	Beijing, China	6th	4 × 100 m relay	38.61
2016	Olympic Games	Rio de Janeiro, Brazil	22nd (sf)	100 m	10.20^{3}
2017	IAAF World Relays	Nassau, Bahamas	–	4 × 100 m relay	DNF
2017	IAAF World Relays	Nassau, Bahamas	8th	4 × 200 m relay	1:25.11

^{1} Did not start in the final.
^{2} Did not finish in the semifinal.
^{3} Did not start in the semifinal.

Olympic Games
Preceded by James Grayman	Flagbearer for Antigua and Barbuda; 2012 London; 2016 Rio de Janeiro	Succeeded by Samantha Roberts; Cejhae Greene
