= Cejhae Greene =

Antiguan sprinter (born 1995)

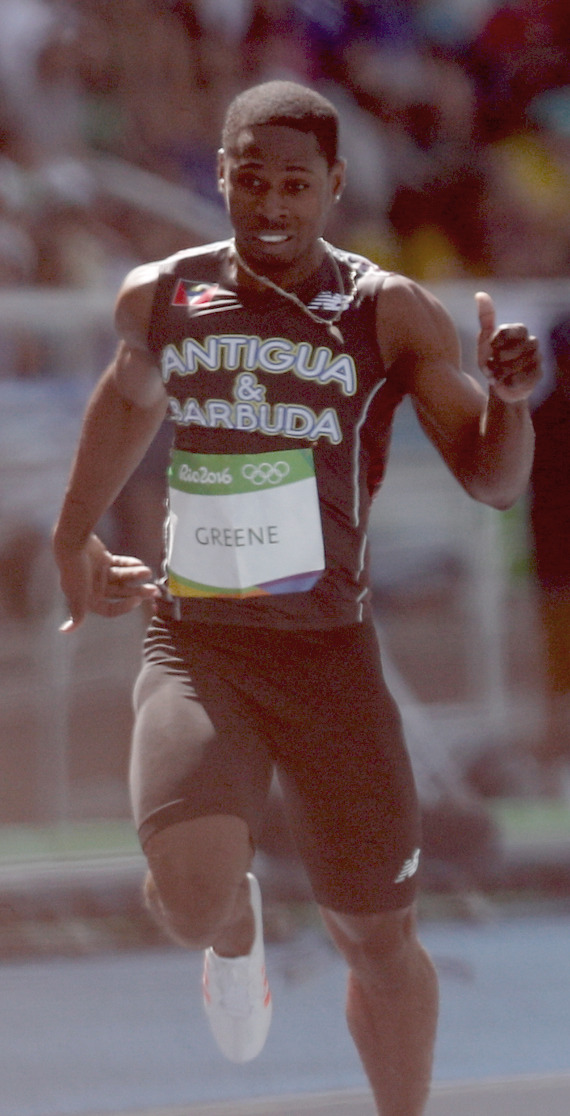
- Greene at the 2016 Olympics

Personal information
- Full name: Cejhae Colin Greene
- Born: 6 October 1995 (age 30) St. John's, Antigua and Barbuda
- Education: Florida State University; University of Georgia
- Height: 1.74 m (5 ft 9 in)
- Weight: 72 kg (159 lb)

Sport
- Sport: Athletics
- Event: Sprints
- Club: Power Speed & Endurance
- Coached by: Heather Samuel/ Teddy Daley

Achievements and titles
- Personal bests: 100 m: 10.00 (2018); 200 m: 20.59 (2017)
Medal record
Representing Antigua and Barbuda
Pan American Games
Bronze medal – third place	2019 Lima	100 m
Central American and Caribbean Games
Bronze medal – third place	2018 Barranquilla	100 m
CAC Junior Championships (Youth)
Bronze medal – third place	2012 San Salvador	100 m

Cejhae Colin Greene (born 6 October 1995) is an Antiguan sprinter. He attended the Princess Margaret School. Cejhae is the first of three children born to Jonah Greene and Colin Greene.

Greene won a bronze medal in the 100 metres at the 2012 Central American and Caribbean Junior Championships in Athletics in San Salvador, El Salvador. In his Olympic debut in Rio at the 2016 Summer Olympics, Greene advanced past the round of heats but finished seventh in his semifinal and did not advance to the final.

He qualified for the 2020 Summer Olympics.

In 2017, Greene was named Antigua and Barbuda Sportsman of the Year award.

Olympic Games
Preceded by Daniel Bailey	Flag bearer for Antigua and Barbuda; Tokyo 2020 with Samantha Roberts; Paris 2024 with Joella Lloyd	Succeeded by Incumbent
