= Donald Christian (cyclist) =

Antiguan cyclist

Personal information
- Born: 28 August 1958 Antigua and Barbuda
- Died: 15 May 2011 (aged 52) Cassada Gardens, Saint John, Antigua and Barbuda

Cycling career
- Sport: Cycling

Donald Christian (28 August 1958 – 15 May 2011) was an Antiguan cyclist. He competed in the 1000m time trial and individual pursuit events at the 1976 Summer Olympics.

He later became the editor of The Camera Shop in Heritage Quay, St. John's. He was a member of the St. John's masonic lodge and the Lions Club.

Christian was killed in a motorcycle accident in Cassada Gardens on May 15, 2011.
