= Heather Samuel =

Antigua and Barbuda sprinter

Personal information
- Born: 6 July 1970 (age 56)

Sport
- Sport: Track and field
Medal record
Women's athletics
Representing Antigua and Barbuda
CARIFTA Games Junior (U20)
Gold medal – first place	1989 Bridgetown	100m
Pan American Games
Bronze medal – third place	1995 Mar del Plata	100 metres
Central American and Caribbean Games
Silver medal – second place	2002 San Salvador	100 metres
Bronze medal – third place	2002 San Salvador	200 metres

Heather Barbara Samuel (born 6 July 1970) is a retired sprinter from Antigua and Barbuda who specialized in the 100 and 200 metres. In 1990 she won two medals at the Central American and Caribbean Games with a silver medal in the 100 metres and a bronze medal in the 200 metres.

Samuel was a sprinter/jumper at Murray State University in Murray, Kentucky from 1991 to 1994; in 2004 she was selected for the Murray State Athletics Hall of Fame. Her World Championships debut came in 1993, when she competed in 100 and 200 m at the 1993 World Championships. She did not reach the final in either event. In May that year she had achieved a career best time over the 100 m, clocking 11.20 seconds in Indianapolis. In May the next year she clocked a career best time of 23.20 over 200 metres in Atlanta.

In 1995 she became Central American and Caribbean Champion for the only time. She again competed in two events at the World Championships, again without reaching the final, and repeated this at the 1997 World Championships.

In 1999 she made her debut at the World Indoor Championships, and only competed in the 100 metres at the World Championships the same year. She competed in the 100 m as well as her last world-level 200 m at the 2000 Summer Olympics, and in the 60 m at the 2001 World Indoor Championships, again without reaching the final round. However, she repeated her success from 1990 at the Central American and Caribbean Games, once again winning a silver and a bronze medal.

In 2003, she reached the 60 m semi-final at the 2003 World Indoor Championships, which was her best result in a global athletics event. Unsuccessful participations at the 2003 World Championships and the 2004 Summer Olympics followed. She has not competed since 2004.

== Achievements ==
Year	Competition	Venue	Position	Event	Notes
Representing Antigua and Barbuda
2002	Central American and Caribbean Games	San Salvador, El Salvador	2nd	100m	11.44 w (wind: 2.3 m/s)
2002	Central American and Caribbean Games	San Salvador, El Salvador	3rd	200m	24.13 (wind: 0.0 m/s)

In 2025, Samuel was awarded a Women of Wadadli and Wa’Omoni Award in the category of Sport.
