= Antigua and Barbuda National Olympic Committee =

National Olympic Committee

- Country: Antigua and Barbuda
- Code: ANT
- Created: 1966
- Recognized: 1976
- Continental Association: PASO
- President: E.P. Chet Greene
- Secretary General: Cliff Williams
- Website: antiguaolympiccommittee.com

The Antigua and Barbuda National Olympic Committee (IOC code: ANT) is the National Olympic Committee representing Antigua and Barbuda. It is also the body responsible for Antigua and Barbuda's representation at the Commonwealth Games.

== See also ==
- Antigua and Barbuda at the Olympics
- Antigua and Barbuda at the Commonwealth Games
